= List of marae in the Bay of Plenty Region =

This is a list of marae (Māori meeting grounds) in the Bay of Plenty Region of New Zealand.

In October 2020, the Government committed $29,614,993 through the Provincial Growth Fund to upgrade 77 marae in the region, with the intention of creating 648 jobs.

== Western Bay of Plenty District ==
Marae name	Wharenui name	Iwi and hapū	Location
Te Awhe o te Rangi Marae	Te Awhe o te Rangi	Ngāti Mākino (Ngāti Mākino, Ngāti Te Awhe), Ngāti Pikiao (Ngāti Pikiao)	Maketū
Haraki Marae	Haraki	Ngāti Rangiwewehi (Ngāti Rangiwewehi ki Tai), Waitaha	Te Puke
Kutaroa Marae	Tauaiti	Ngāi Te Rangi (Ngāti Tauaiti)	Matakana Island
Makahae / Te Kahika	Makahae	Tapuika (Ngāti Tuheke)	Te Puke
Manoeka	Hei	Waitaha	Te Puke
Te Matai / Ngāti Kurī	Tapuika	Tapuika (Ngāti Kurī)	Rangiuru
Moko / Ngāti Moko	Mokotangatakotahi	Tapuika (Ngāti Moko)	Te Puke
Oponui Marae	Wharenui dismantled	Ngāi Te Rangi (Te Ngare)	Rangiwaea Island
Opureora Marae	Tuwhiwhia	Ngāi Te Rangi (Ngāi Tuwhiwhia, Ngāti Tauaiti)	Matakana Island
Ōtamarākau Marae	Waitahanui a Hei	Ngāti Mākino (Ngāti Mākino, Ngāti Te Awhe)	Ōtamarākau
Otāwhiwhi Marae	Tamaoho	Ngāi Te Rangi (Ngāi Tauwhao)	Bowentown
Paparoa Marae	Werahiko	Ngāti Ranginui (Pirirākau)	Te Puna
Poutūterangi	Takurua	Ngāti Ranginui (Pirirākau)	Te Puna
Te Paamu	Tia	Tapuika (Ngāti Marukukere)	Rangiuru
Te Rangihouhiri / Oruarahi	Te Rangihouhiri	Ngāi Te Rangi (Ngāi Tamawhariua)	Matakana Island
Rangiwaea Marae	Te Haka a Te Tupere	Ngāi Te Rangi (Ngāi Tauwhao)	Rangiwaea Island
Te Rere a Tukahia Marae	Tamawhariua	Ngāi Te Rangi (Ngāi Tamawhariua)	Katikati
Tawakepito	Tawakepito	Tapuika (Ngāti Tuheke)	Te Puke
Tawhitinui Marae	Kahi	Ngāti Ranginui (Pirirākau)	Whakamarama
Tokerau	Pikiao	Ngāti Pikiao	Pongakawa
Tuapiro Marae	Ngā Kurī a Wharei	Ngāti Ranginui (Ngāti Te Wai)	Katikati
Tūhourangi Marae	Tūhourangi	Tūhourangi	Rangiuru
Tutereinga Marae	Tutereinga	Ngāti Ranginui (Ngāti Taka, Pirirākau)	Te Puna
Whakaue / Tapiti	Whakaue Kaipapa	Ngāti Whakaue (Ngāti Whakaue ki Maketū)	Maketū

== Tauranga City ==
Marae name	Wharenui name	Iwi and hapū	Location
Hairini Marae	Ranginui	Ngāti Ranginui (Ngāi Te Ahi)	Hairini
Hangarau / Peterehema	Hangarau	Ngāti Ranginui (Ngāti Hangarau)	Bethlehem
Hungahungatoroa / Whakahinga	Tāpuiti	Ngāi Te Rangi (Ngāi Tukairangi)	Matapihi
Huria	Tamatea Pokaiwhenua	Ngāti Ranginui (Ngāi Tamarawaho)	Judea
Mangatawa or Tamapahore Marae	Tamapahore	Ngāi Te Rangi (Ngā Pōtiki)	Papamoa
Opopoti	Wairakewa	Ngāi Te Rangi (Ngāti He)	Maungatapu
Te Wairoa Marae	Kahu Tapu	Ngāti Ranginui (Ngāti Kahu, Ngāti Pango, Ngāti Rangi)	Bethlehem
Tahuwhakatiki / Romai	Rongomainohorangi	Ngāi Te Rangi (Ngā Pōtiki)	Welcome Bay
Waikari Marae	Tapukino	Ngāi Te Rangi (Ngāti Tapu)	Matapihi
Waimapu / Ruahine	Te Kaupapa o Tawhito	Ngāti Ranginui (Ngāti Ruahine)	Hairini
Whareroa Marae	Rauru ki Tahi	Ngāi Te Rangi (Ngāti Kuku, Ngāi Tukairangi)	Mount Maunganui

== Mōtītī Island ==
Marae name	Wharenui name	Iwi and hapū	Location
Te Hinga o te Ra or Te Karioi	Te Hinga o te Ra	Ngāti Awa (Ngāti Maumoana, Ngāti Makerewai, Ngāti Takahanga)	Mōtītī Island
Te Rua Kopiha Marae	Tamatea ki te Huatahi	Ngāti Awa (Ngāti Maumoana, Ngāti Makerewai, Ngāti Takahanga)	Mōtītī Island

== Rotorua Lakes District ==
Marae name	Wharenui name	Iwi and Hapū	Location
Apumoana	Apumoana o te Ao Kohatu	Tūhourangi (Hurunga Te Rangi, Ngāti Kahupoko, Ngāti Taeotu, Ngāti Tumatawera)	Lynmore
Te Awawherowhero	No wharenui	Ngāti Whakaue (Ngāti Rautao)	Ngongotahā
Hinemihi Marae	Hinemihi	Tūhourangi (Ngāti Hinemihi, Ngāti Tuohonoa), Ngāti Tarāwhai (Ngāti Hinemihi)	Ngāpuna
Te Huingawaka Marae	Te Huingawaka	Tūhoe (Ngāti Kaingaroa, Nga Tipuna O Te Motu)	Kaingaroa Forest
Mataarae Marae	Mataarae	Ngāti Tahu - Ngāti Whaoa (Ngāti Mataarae, Ngāti Whaoa)	Reporoa
Mataatua Marae	Aroha a te Arawa	Tūhoe	Utuhina
Ngāpuna / Hurunga o te Rangi	Hurunga o Te Rangi	Ngāti Whakaue (Ngāti Hurunga Te Rangi, Ngāti Taeotu), Tūhourangi (Hurunga Te Rangi, Ngāti Kahu Upoko)	Ngāpuna
Kearoa Marae	Kearoa	Ngāti Kea Ngāti Tuarā	Horohoro
Koutu / Karenga	Tumahaurangi	Ngāti Whakaue (Ngāti Karenga)	Koutu
Te Kuirau / Utuhina	Te Roro o Te Rangi	Ngāti Whakaue (Ngāti te Roro o te Rangi)	Ōhinemutu
Ōhākī Marae	Tahumatua	Ngāti Tahu - Ngāti Whaoa (Ngāti Tahu)	Reporoa
Ōwhata / Hinemoa	Tūtanekai	Ngāti Whakaue (Ngāti Korouateka, Ngāti te Roro o te Rangi)	Ōwhata
Te Pākira	Wahiao	Tūhourangi (Ngāti Puta, Ngāti Uruhina, Ngāti Wahiao, Tūhourangi, Ngāti Taoi)	Whakarewarewa
Te Papaiouru	Tamatekapua	Ngāti Whakaue (Ngāti Hurunga Te Rangi, Ngāti Pūkaki, Ngāti Taeotu, Ngāti Te Rangiwaho, Ngāti te Roro o te Rangi, Ngāti Tūnohopū)	Ōhinemutu
Para te Hoata / Tūnohopū	Tūnohopū	Ngāti Whakaue (Ngāti Tūnohopū, Ngāti Whakaue)	Ōhinemutu
Parawai	Whatumairangi	Ngāti Whakaue (Ngāti Tuteaiti, Te Whatumairangi), Te Ure o Uenukukōpako (Ngāti Te Ngākau, Ngāti Tura)	Ngongotahā
Pikirangi	Ohomairangi	Te Ure o Uenukukōpako (Ngāti Hauora)	Rotokawa
Pounamunui	Houmaitawhiti	Ngāti Pikiao (Ngāti Hinekura)	Okere Falls
Punawhakareia	Uenuku mai Rarotonga	Ngāti Pikiao (Ngāti Te Rangiunuora)	Rotoiti Forest
Rongomaipapa	Maruahangaroa	Ngāti Kea Ngāti Tuarā	Horohoro
Ruamatā	Uenukukōpako	Te Ure o Uenukukōpako (Ngati Te Kanawa)	Rotokawa
Ruato / Ngā Pūmanawa	Ngā Pūmanawa e Waru	Ngāti Rongomai	Rotoiti Forest
Taharangi	Maruahangaroa	Ngāti Kea Ngāti Tuarā, Ngāti Whakaue (Ngāti Taharangi)	Koutu
Tāheke / Opatia	Rangitihi	Ngāti Pikiao (Ngāti Hinerangi)	Okere Falls
Te Takinga	Te Takinga	Ngāti Pikiao (Ngāti Te Takinga)	Okere Falls
Tapuaekura a Hatupatu Marae	Tapuaekura a Hatupatu	Ngāti Rongomai	Rotoiti Forest
Tapuaeharuru	Uruika	Ngāti Pikiao (Ngāti Kawiti, Ngāti Tamateatutahi)	Rotoiti Forest
Tārukenga	Te Ngākau	Ngāti Whakaue (Ngāti Te Ngakau, Ngāti Tura), Te Ure o Uenukukōpako (Ngāti Te Ngākau, Ngāti Tura)	Ngongotahā
Tarimano	Tawakeheimoa	Ngāti Rangiwewehi (Ngāti Rangiwewehi ki Uta)	Ngongotahā
Taupari	Paruaharanui	Ngāti Pikiao (Ngāti Paruaharanui)	Mourea
Taurua	Te Rangiunuora	Ngāti Pikiao (Ngāti Te Rangiunuora)	Rotoiti Forest
Te Toke	Te Rama	Ngāti Tahu - Ngāti Whaoa (Ngāti Te Rama, Ngāti Whaoa)	Reporoa
Waiatuhi	Kahumatamomoe	Ngāti Rongomai, Ngāti Pikiao (Ngāti Kahumatamomoe, Ngāti Paruaharanui, Ngāti Te Takinga)	Mourea
Te Waiiti	Hinekura	Ngāti Rongomai, Ngāti Pikiao (Ngāti Hinekura)	Rotoiti Forest
Waikite	Tiki	Ngāti Whakaue (Ngāti Whakaue)	Ōhinemutu
Waikōhatu	Tarāwhai	Ngāti Tarāwhai (Ngāti Rangitakaroro)	Rotoiti Forest
Waikuta	Rangitunaeke	Ngāti Whakaue (Ngāti Rangitunaeke)	Ngongotahā
Waimahana / Marapounamu	Rahurahu	Ngāti Tahu - Ngāti Whaoa (Ngāti Rahurahu)	Reporoa
Waiohewa	Rangiwhakaekeau	Ngāti Rangiteaorere	Tikitere
Waitetī / Weriweri	Ngāraranui	Ngāti Whakaue (Ngāti Ngāraranui), Te Ure o Uenukukōpako (Ngāti Ngāraranui)	Ngongotahā

== Kawerau District ==
Marae name	Wharenui name	Iwi and Hapū	Location
Tohia o te Rangi	Waitaha Ariki Kore	Ngāti Tūwharetoa (Ngāi Tamarangi)	Kawerau

== Whakatane District ==
Marae name	Wharenui name	Iwi and Hapū	Location
Hahuru Marae	Hahuru	Ngāti Tūwharetoa (Ngāti Irawharo, Ngāi Tamarangi, Ngāti Peehi, Ngāti Poutomuri, Ngāti Umutahi, Te Aotahi)	Onepu
Te Hokowhitu a Tū ki te Rāhui Marae	Te Hokowhitu a Tūmatauenga	Ngāti Awa (Ngāti Wharepaia, Ngāti Hokopū - Te Hokowhitu a Tu Ki Te Rāhui)	Whakatāne
Iramoko Marae	Te Paetata	Ngāti Awa (Te Tāwera)	Matatā
Kākānui (Tīpapa)	Kākahu Tāpiki	Tūhoe (Kākahu Tāpiki)	Ruatāhuna
Kokohinau / Tuhimata	O Ruataupare	Ngāti Awa (Te Pahipoto)	Te Teko
Te Māpou Marae	Rongotangiawa	Ngāti Awa (Ngāti Hāmua)	Te Teko
Mātaatua Marae	Te Whai-a-te-Motu	Tūhoe (Te Urewera)	Ruatāhuna
Matahi Marae	Te Huinga ō te Kura	Tūhoe (Ngāi Tamatuhirae)	Matahi
Maungapōhatu / Te Māpou	Tane-nui-a-rangi	Tūhoe (Tamakaimoana)	Maungapohatu
Moewhare / Karangaranga	Moewhare	Ngāti Manawa (Moewhare)	Murupara
Murumurunga Marae	Wharepakau	Tūhoe (Ngāti Whare), Ngāti Whare	Te Whāiti
Ngāhina Marae	Tāwhaki	Tūhoe (Ngāti Tāwhaki)	Rūātoki
Ngāti Umutahi Marae	Umutahi	Ngāti Tūwharetoa (Ngāti Iramoko, Ngāti Umutahi, Te Tāwera)	Matatā
Ōhāua or Ōhāua te Rangi	Te Poho-o-Pōtiki	Tūhoe (Ngāti Rongo)	Ruatāhuna
Ōhotu Marae	Tūhoe Pōtiki	Tūhoe (Te Whānau Pani)	Rūātoki
Omuriwaka Marae	Te Tātua o Hape ki Tūārangi	Tūhoe (Ngāi Tamatuhirae)	Matahi
Ōniao	Tūwharetoa	Ngāti Tūwharetoa (Ngāi Tamarangi, Ngāti Umutahi, Ngāti Manuwhare)	Matatā
Ōpūtao Marae	Te Ngāwari	Tūhoe (Ngāti Tāwhaki)	Ruatāhuna
Ōtekura Marae	Te Ōhāki	Tūhoe (Tamakaimoana)	Ruatāhuna
Ōtenuku Marae	Tahatu o Te Ao	Tūhoe (Ngāti Kōura)	Rūātoki
Ōwhakatoro or Te Mauku	Ta Apirana Turupa Ngata	Tūhoe (Ngāti Rongo)	Tāwera
Painoaiho Marae	Ruatapu	Ngāti Manawa (Ngāti Koro)	Murupara
Paneteure or Kaiti Marae	Hui te Rangiora	Tūhoe (Ngāti Rongo)	Rūātoki
Papakāinga Marae	Kōura-kino	Tūhoe (Ngāti Kōura)	Rūātoki
Pāpueru Marae	Te Whatu o Te Kanohi	Tūhoe (Ngāti Tāwhaki)	Ruatāhuna
Piripari Marae	Tamaikaimoana	Tūhoe (Tamakaimoana, Ngāi Tātua)	Waimana
Pouahinau Marae	Tūranga Pikitoi	Tūhoe (Tūranga Pikitoi)	Waimana
Puawairua Marae	Puawairua	Ngāti Awa (Ngāti Hikakino)	Pāroa
Pūkeko Marae	Pūkeko	Ngāti Awa (Ngāti Pūkeko)	Poroporo
Rāhiri Marae	Rāhiri ō te Rangi	Tūhoe (Ngāti Rere)	Waimana
Rangataua Marae	Rangataua	Ngāti Awa (Ngāti Rangataua)	Poroporo
Te Rangihouhiri II Marae	Te Rangihouhiri II	Ngāti Awa (Ngāi Te Rangihouhiri II)	Whakatāne
Rangimarie Marae	Rarawhati	Ngāti Awa (Te Whānau o Tariao Tapuke)	Poroporo
Rangitahi Marae	Apahapaitaketake	Ngāti Manawa (Ngāti Hui)	Murupara
Rangitihi Marae	Rangiaohia	Ngāti Rangitihi	Matatā
Rāroa Marae	Te Poho ō Tānemoeahi	Tūhoe (Ko Tamaruarangi)	Waimana
Rewarewa Marae	Te Rangimoaho, Kuramihirangi	Tūhoe (Te Māhurehure)	Rūātoki
Rewatu Marae	Ueimua	Ngāti Awa (Ngāi Tamapare)	Poroporo
Ruaihona Marae	Ruaihona	Ngāti Awa (Ngāi Tamaoki)	Te Teko
Taiwhakaea Marae	Taiwhakaea II	Ngāti Awa (Ngāi Taiwhakaea II)	Coastlands
Tanatana Marae	Te Poho ō Tuhoe	Tūhoe (Ngāti Rere)	Waimana
Tātāhoata Marae	Te Tapuae	Tūhoe (Ngāi Te Riu)	Ruatāhuna
Tataiāhape Marae	Takutai ō Terangi	Tūhoe (Ngāti Raka)	Waimana
Tauanui Marae	Te Poho ō Tamatea	Tūhoe (Whakatāne Hapū)	Waimana
Tauarau Marae	Rongokarae	Tūhoe (Ngāti Rongo)	Rūātoki
Tāwhana Marae	Ngā Tau E Maha	Tūhoe (Ngā Maihi)	Waimana
Tīpapa Marae	Tangiharuru	Ngāti Manawa (Ngāi Tokowaru)	Murupara
Tokitareke / Warahoe	Te Puna o Te Orohi	Ngāti Awa (Warahoe)	Whakatāne
Toroa / Pupuaruhe	Toroa	Ngāti Awa (Te Patuwai)	Whakatāne
Te Tōtara Marae	Te Puhi o Mātaatua	Tūhoe (Te Urewera)	Rūātoki
Tuapō Marae	Te Ao Hou	Tūhoe (Tamakaimoana)	Matahi
Tuariki Marae	Tuariki	Ngāti Awa (Tuariki)	Te Teko
Tūteao Marae	Tūteao	Ngāti Awa (Ngā Maihi)	Te Teko
Uiraroa Marae	Uiraroa	Ngāti Awa (Ngāi Tamawera)	Te Teko
Te Umuroa Marae	Te Poho-o-Parahaki	Tūhoe (Ngāti Manunui)	Ruatāhuna
Uwhiārae Marae	Te Paena	Tūhoe (Ngāi Te Paena)	Ruatāhuna
Te Wai-iti Marae	Te Poho o Kurī Kino	Tūhoe (Ngāti Kurī Kino)	Ruatāhuna
Waikirikiri Marae	Toi-kai-rakau	Tūhoe (Hāmua, Ngāti Mura)	Rūātoki
Waikotikoti Marae	Hinenuitepo	Tūhoe (Te Karaha, Ngāti Hāmua, Warahoe), Ngāti Whare	Te Whāiti
Waiōhau Marae	Tama ki Hikurangi	Tūhoe (Ngāti Haka, Patuheuheu)	Waiōhau
Waireporepo Marae	No wharenui	Ngāti Whare	Te Whāiti
Whakarae Marae	Toi te Huatahi	Tūhoe (Whakatāne Hapū, Ngāi Tama)	Matahi
Te Whare o Toroa Marae	Wairaka	Ngāti Awa (Ngāti Wharepaia, Ngāti Hokopū - Te Whare o Toroa)	Whakatāne

== Opotiki District ==
Marae name	Wharenui name	Iwi and Hapū	Location
Te Kaha Marae	Tūkākī	Te Whānau-ā-Apanui (Te Whānau a Te Ēhutu)	Te Kaha
Kutarere Marae	Te Poho o Tamaterangi	Tūhoe (Tūranga Pikitoi), Whakatōhea (Te Ūpokorehe)	Kutarere
Maraenui Marae	Te Iwarau	Te Whānau-ā-Apanui (Te Whānau a Hikarukutai)	Hāwai
Maromahue Marae	Te Poho o Kahungunu	Whakatōhea (Te Ūpokorehe)	Ōpōtiki
Te Maru o Hinemaka Marae	Pararaki	Te Whānau-ā-Apanui (Te Whānau a Pararaki)	Raukokore
Maungaroa Marae	Kaiaio	Te Whānau-ā-Apanui (Te Whānau a Kaiaio)	Te Kaha
Ōmāio Marae	Rongomaihuatahi	Te Whānau-ā-Apanui (Te Whānau a Nuku)	Omāio
Opape Marae	Muriwai	Whakatōhea (Ngāi Tamahaua / Ngāi Tama)	Opape
Ōpeke / Opekerau / Waioeka	Irapuaia	Whakatōhea (Ngāti Irapuaia / Ngāti Ira)	Waioweka
Ōtūwhare Marae	Te Poho o Rūtāia	Te Whānau-ā-Apanui (Te Whānau a Rutaia)	Omāio
Pāhāōa Marae	Kahurautao	Te Whānau-ā-Apanui (Te Whānau a Kahurautao)	Te Kaha
Te Rere Marae	Te Iringa	Whakatōhea (Ngāti Ngahere)	Ōpōtiki
Roimata Marae	Te Ao Marama	Whakatōhea (Te Ūpokorehe)	Kutarere
Rongopopoia or Te Kahikatea	Rongopopoia	Tūhoe (Upokorehe)	Ōpōtiki
Torere Marae	Torerenui a Rua	Ngāitai	Tōrere
Tunapahore Marae	Haraawaka	Te Whānau-ā-Apanui (Te Whānau a Haraawaka)	Hāwai
Waiaua Marae	Ruamoko	Whakatōhea (Ngāti Patumoana / Ngāti Patu)	Waiaua
Waiōrore Marae	Toihau	Te Whānau-ā-Apanui (Te Whānau a Toihau / Hinetekahu)	Te Kaha
Wairūrū Marae	Hinemahuru or Mihi Kotukutuko	Te Whānau-ā-Apanui (Te Whānau a Maruhaeremuri)	Raukokore
Whangaparāōa Marae	Kauaetangohia or Te Putahou	Te Whānau-ā-Apanui (Te Whānau a Kauaetangohia)	Cape Runaway
Whitianga Marae	Tūtawake	Te Whānau-ā-Apanui (Te Whānau a Tutawake)	Omāio

== See also ==
- Lists of marae in New Zealand
- List of schools in the Bay of Plenty Region
