= Te Tākinga =

Te Tākinga was a Māori rangatira (chief) of the iwi Ngāti Pikiao in the Te Arawa confederation of tribes in the Bay of Plenty region of New Zealand. He played a decisive role in the wars between Ngāti Pikiao and Tūhourangi over Lake Rotoiti, which resulted in Ngāti Pikiao taking control of the lake. He is also the founder of the Ngāti Te Tākinga hapū.

== Life ==
Te Tākinga was the son of Pikiao the younger, through whom he was a direct descendant of Pikiao, founder of Ngāti Pikiao, and of Tama-te-kapua, who captained the Arawa canoe from Hawaiki to New Zealand. Tūtānekai murdered Te Tākinga's grandfather, leading Ngāti Pikiao to relocate from Owhata to Lake Rotokakahi and Lake Tarawera. After Ngāti Pikiao murdered relatives of Tūtānekai, he sacked the pā of Moura on Lake Tarawera in revenge, but Ngāti Pikiao were at Te Puwha on the eastern side of Tarawera, when Moura was taken, so they survived and relocated to Matata, then to Otamarakau and Pukehina, before being invited to Te Puia on Lake Rotoehu by Pikiao's friend Matarewha.

=== Battle of Harakekengunguru ===
Tūtānekai and his people went to visit his Tuhourangi cousins at Tumoana pā on Lake Rotoiti. During some friendly sparring, Tūtānekai's son Tamakuri was accidentally killed. Tūtānekai and his people fled. Meanwhile, the Tuhourangi people took Tamakuri's body to Omawhiti, where they ate it. Tūtānekai went seeking allies in getting revenge for this. Having been refused by more natural allies, Tūtānekai eventually decided to seek help from his former enemies, Ngāti Pikiao. He went to Te Puia, walked right in and sat down between Te Tākinga and his father Pikiao. Matarewha, raised his club to kill Tūtānekai and Te Tākinga winked at him, encouraging him to do the deed, but Matarewha decided not to, because he was afraid that he would hit Pikiao or Te Tākinga by accident. Tūtānekai managed to make peace with Tūtānekai and convinced them to join him in his attack on Tuhourangi. They brought the local members of Waitaha into the expedition as well. Tūtānekai then returned home.

Te Tākinga and Matarewha led an army from Waitangi hot springs, along Te Komutunga ridge to Tumoana. When they reached the pā, it was nighttime and they encountered and killed a lady called Turukutia, who had been fishing for kōura. Te Tākinga and Matarewha led a small group of the attackers appeared before Tumoana at dawn and challenged the Tuhourangi defenders to fight, while the rest of the attackers hid some distance away. Tuhourangi attacked, the Te Tākinga and Matarewha's group feigned a retreat, leading the Tuhourangi back to their main force, which ambushed and defeated them. This was called the battle of Harakekengunguru. During the feigned retreat, Te Tākinga tripped over a tree root and sprained his ankle at a place called Parua. He would have been killed by the Tuhourangi warriors, but his brother Hinekura leapt out and rescued him. Te Tākinga's other brother, Te Rangiunuora "took the last fish" of the battle (i.e. made the final kill), when he killed Whioi, as he attempted to swim to safety. The war party then captured Tumoana, ate the men they had killed and enslaved the rest.

After this, the war party travelled to Pareteiro and lit a fire to call Tūtānekai to come with canoes to collect the victorious warriors. When they reached Mokoia, they gave Tūtānekai the body of Whioi, as compensation for the death of Tamakuri. In return, Tūtānekai gave them a huge canoe called Whanaupukupuku. The war party took this canoe and two others along Lake Rotoiti to Tapuaeharuru, where they carried the canoes over to Rotoehu. When they got home, they killed all of the prisoners except for one woman, Te Aoniwaho, who was married by a Ngāti Pikiao rangatira called Kotiora.

=== Battle of Kotarahure ===
Kotiora mistreated Te Aoniwaho, so she helped her father to assassinate him. Te Whakatane of Ngāti Pikiao led an attack on the Tūhourangi in revenge, sacking Unaatekapua pā and killing the rangatira Te Karerepounamu. In response to this, two Tūhourangi rangatira, Te Heroro and Te Herapunga launched a war party from Te Weta Bay, which landed at Tapuaeharuru and advanced along the Tahuna path towards Lake Rotoehu. On this path, they encountered and killed three of Te Tākinga's sons - Te Rangikaheke, Tutaki, and Ruamoko - in the Battle of Kotarahure. Some sources say that Te Tākinga's sons were leading a Ngāti Pikiao and Waitaha war party, others that they had only a small band. After the battle, Te Heroro and Te Herapunga returned home with the bodies of Te Tākinga's sons.

=== Te Weta campaign ===
To get revenge for his sons' death, Te Tākinga travelled to the Bay of Plenty coast in order to recruit allies from the Waitaha and Ngāti Whakahinga. He visited Otomarakau, Kaikokopu, Pongakawa, Matamanu, and Tupuki and received promises of support from the chiefs of Waitaha: Te Kanewa, Tuteumu, Te Rawahirua, Tutumanga, and Tuweweia. They planned for the Waitaha forces to attack Tūhourangi at Te Weta from the northeast, while Ngāti Pikiao would attack the same pā from Lake Rotoiti. The Waitaha forces were led by Tutumanga, who mustered at Maketū, marched along the Kaharoa trail to Otuheroa by Lake Rotoiti, where they sent out scouting parties. These scouts came to a place called Te Parapara, where there were lots of ducks and they froze, afraid to move, in case the ducks flew off en masse and alerted the Tūhourangi of their approach. Tutumanga sang a karakia (incantation) to silence and freeze the ducks. They continued on and attacked Te Weta, without waiting for Ngāti Pikiao. Meanwhile, the Ngāti Pikiao forces arrived, led by Te Poke in the canoe Tamateatuapiko. They captured a woman called Pukerimu, swimming away from Te Weta. She accidentally revealed Te Heroro who was also swimming away, with his head hidden under a large bowl, so they pulled him up and killed him. Te Herapunga was killed by Te Kanewa, defending Te Weta from the Waitaha.

The forces moved on to Pukurahi pā, where they stacked wood next to the palisade and set it on fire. The leader of the defenders, Waitawhiti, went up the puwhara (watchtower) and revealed that the pā contained the baby Karaewahanui, a grandson of Hinekura (Te Tākinga's brother). Hinekura convinced Te Tākinga and Tutumanga to abandon the attack. The force moved on to Titaka, but abandoned that attack in turn because the pā contained Te Wharekaikino, son of Te Koru of Waitaha. Similarly, the force attacked and then withdrew from Paehinahina, because Hinekura's son Puwhakaoho was there. The force captured Kakanui pā and killed very many people. The force came to Motuohiwa and killed the rangatira Parapara and Te Taniwha. Motutawa was captured and Kaorewhare was killed. The forces captured Pukeroa and the rangatira there, Kauhaterangi, fled to Te Kopuakino, but they captured Kopuakino on the same day and killed Kauhaterangi. Then they took Makamakahinaki, but the rangatira, Te Wharearangatiki, fled to Te Urunga.

After the capture of Makamakahinaki, Te Tākinga called a hui (meeting) of all the forces at Opatia. He declared that he had got his revenge and instructed the Waitaha and Ngāti Whakahinga to return home. The surviving Tūhourangi gathered at Paeehinahina, Pukurahi, and Motutawa under Te Rangipuawhe.

=== Kotipu and Motutawa ===
In Te Tākinga's old age, Tūhourangi had largely rebuilt their position around Lake Rotoiti, so he decided to launch a final expedition to drive them out once and for all. They set out from Tapuaeharuru in two canoes, Te Tuhiterata and Tamateatuapiko. Te Tākinga captained Te Tuhiterata, along with Hinekura, Te Rangiunuora, Whakatane, Ruatai, Te Heheu, and Tokihapai. Tamateatuapiko was captained by Takaeuewa, Tuteumu, and Puku. The canoes stopped for the night at Ngatiti. At dawn, Tokihapai captured a woman called Kaitohi, who had been out singing. They interrogated her and used the information to attack and capture Kotipu pā, which was run by her father Te Rangiawharetiki (who escaped from the attackers). They discovered from the prisoners that most of the pā's inhabitants were in the forest at Kohangakaeaea, making canoes under the leadership of Purakau son of Paraoa, so they attacked and killed those people. Then they returned home to Rotoehu.

A little while later, Te Tākinga set out in Te Tuhitarata once more and landed at Purakau. He went on his own to Motutawa pā, the major remaining Tūhourangi stronghold on the lake. There he found Te Rangipuawhe, eating the preserved flesh of one of his sons who had been killed at Kotarahure. Te Rangipuawhe conceded that he could not give recompense for the death of the sons, so he voluntarily led his people away from Rotoiti to settle on Lake Tarawera and Lake Rotokakahi (the island Motutawa in Lake Rotokakahi is named in memorial of Motutawa pā).

Four of Te Tākinga's sons came to Motutawa and divided the conquered land between themselves. Kiore received Mourea and Waikarangatia. Mangō and Manene got the land north of Ohau Stream. Te Awanui got the land between Pukurahi and Pukearuhe. They travelled north along the Kaituna River, surveying the area. At Turirau, the rangatira Te Huia gave Mangō a feast, but a disagreement took place, which culminated in the four brothers killing Te Huia and placing his head on a rewarewa stake. The place where this happened was named Te Upoko o Te Huia (the head of Te Huia) as a result. In a subsequent battle, they drove off some new settlers, led by Poia and Miromiro, from this area.

== Family and legacy ==
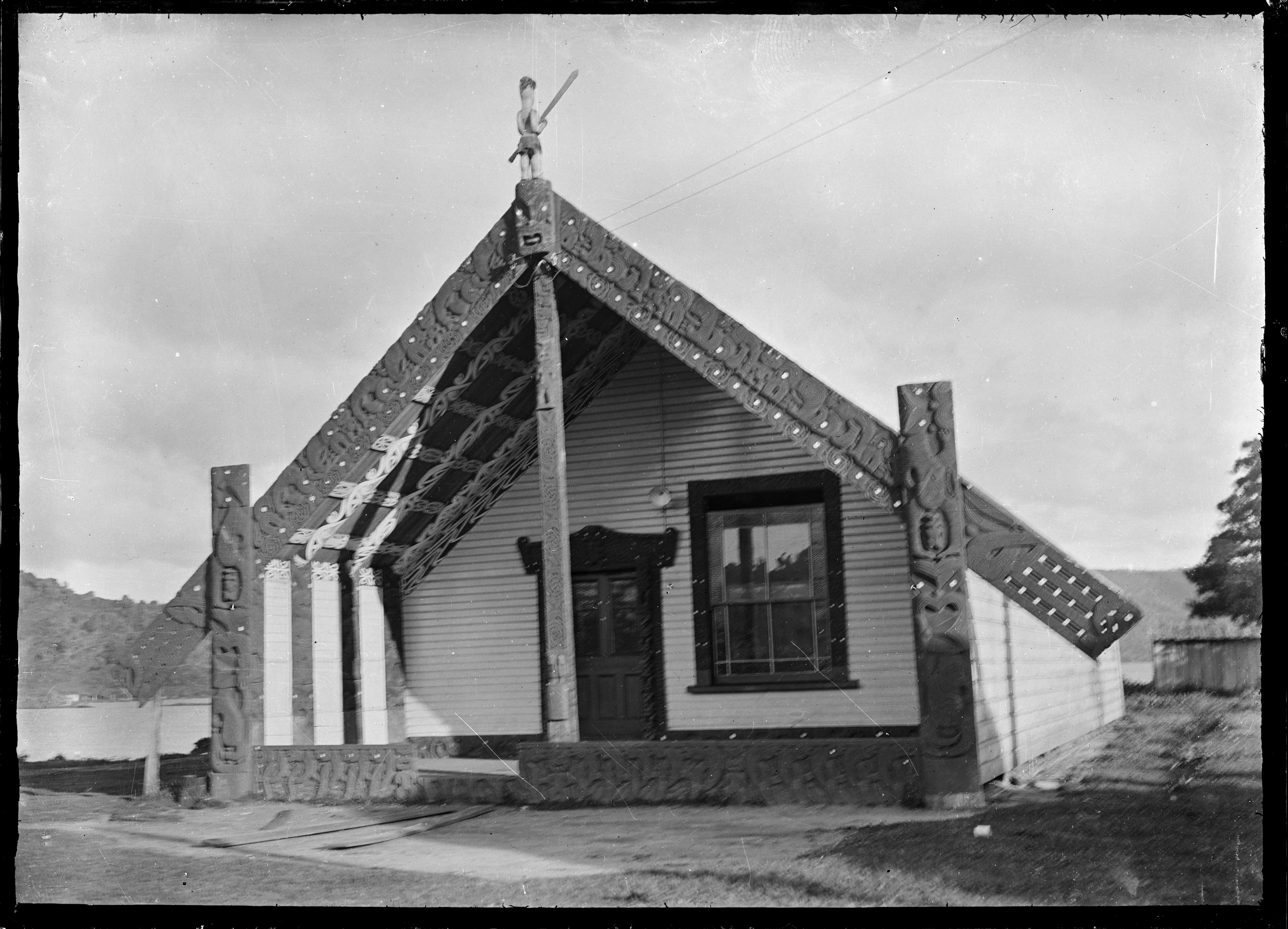
Second Te Takinga wharenui at Te Takinga marae, Mourea, in the 1930s.

Te Tākinga married Hinekiri, Hineui, and Hineora (daughter of Te Ra of Waitaha) and had children with all three of them:

- Manene (son of Hinekiri)
- Mangō (son of Hinekiri)
- Te Awanui (son of Hineui)
- Tāmiuru, who married Taiwere:

- Pūkaki.

- Te Rangikaheke (son of Hineora), killed at the Battle of Kotarahure.
- Tutaki (son of Hineora), killed at the Battle of Kotarahure.
- Parua (son of Hineora)
- Ruamoko (son of Hineora), killed at the Battle of Kotarahure.
- Kiore (son of Hineora), who married Whakahi:

- Te Whakaruru, who chopped down the totara Rakeiao in the territory of Tarāwhai and was killed at Ruato by Tuahia in revenge.

- Hikaawarua (son of Hineora)

Te Tākinga is the ancestor of the hapū Ngāti Te Tākinga. Their marae and wharenui, located at Mourea, are both named Te Takinga in his honour.

== Bibliography ==
- Stafford, D.M. (1967). Te Arawa: A History of the Arawa People. Rotorua, New Zealand: A.H. & A.W. Reed.
