= Rahurahu =

Places in the life of Rahurahu
1 Nga Awa Purua
2 Paeroa Mountains
3 Maunga Kākaramea
4 Waimahana

Rahurahu was a Māori rangatira (chief) of Ngāti Raukawa in Waikato, and the founding ancestor of the Ngāti Rahurahu hapū. He led an attack on Ngāti Tahu and Ngāti Whaoa around the seventeenth century.

== Life ==
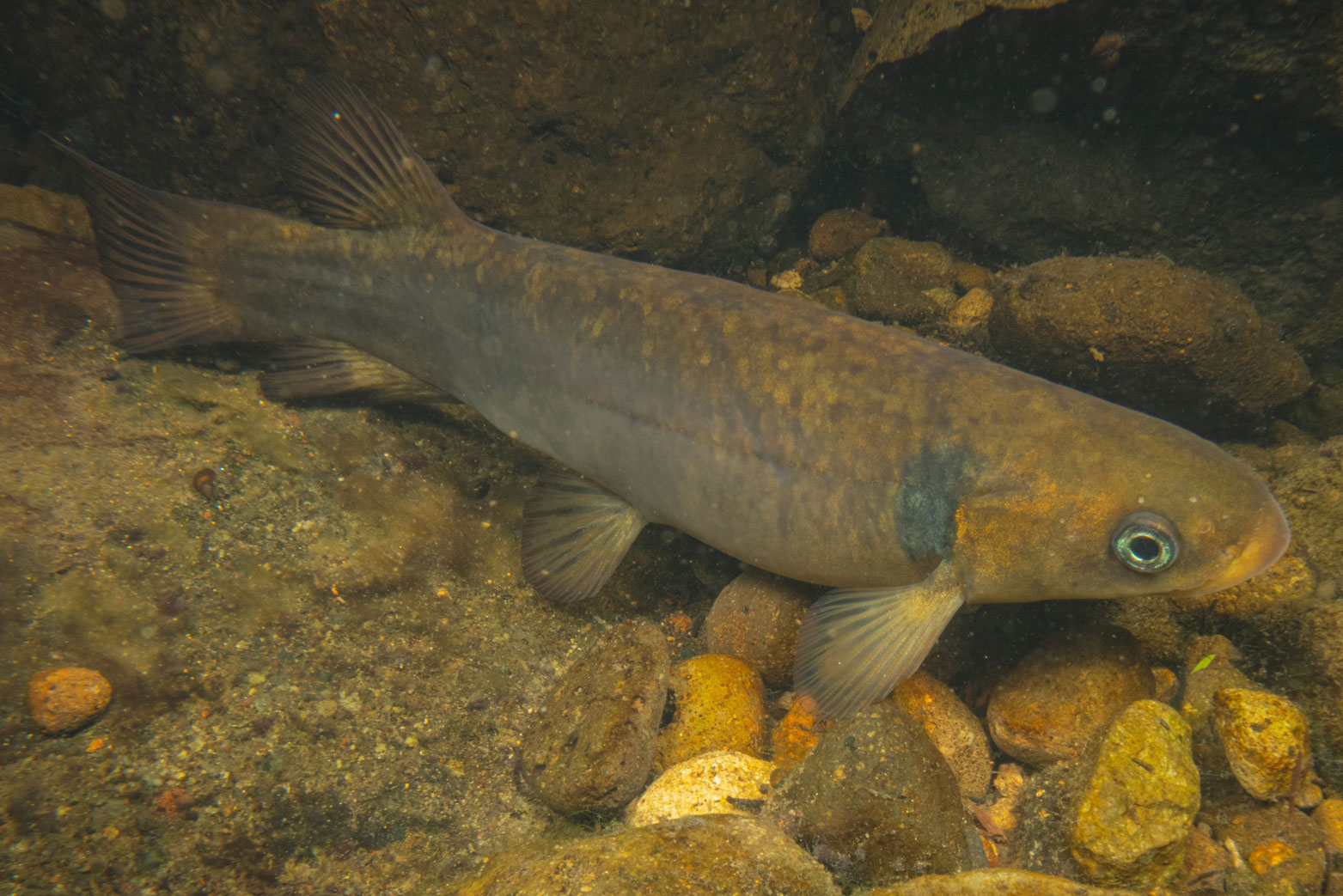
Kōkopu.

Rahurahu was a member of Ngāti Raukawa and a direct descendant of Raukawa, son of Tūrongo and Māhina-a-rangi. He visited a settlement inhabited by Ngāti Tahu and Ngāti Whaoa at Nga Awa Purua on the Waikato River and they served him their catch of kōkopu, which he declared to be outstandingly good. He therefore decided to conquer the area for himself. He returned to Nga Awa Purua, launched a surprise attack, and took the settlement. The inhabitants fled into the Paeroa mountains and to Ngāti Apumoana at Maunga Kākaramea.

Rahurahu pursued the refugees into the Paeroa mountains and attacked them again, so they joined their kin at Maunga Kākaramea. Rahurahu led his army to Maungakakaramea, but the chief Te Rangiwakatara led Ngāti Apumoana out to fight him. A battle was fought at Purukorukoru and both Te Rangiwakatara and Rahurahu were killed. Ngāti Apumoana blamed Ngāti Whaoa for the death of Te Rangiwakatara, so they attacked them. The Ngāti Whaoa chiefs Te Tokoterangi and Koromaranga were killed. Another chief, Tangonoa, was given to Te Apiti as a slave.

== Family and legacy ==
Rahurahu had a son, Tamamahu, who married a captured woman of Ngāti Tahu. The Rahurahu wharenui at Waimahana marae is named in his honour.

== Bibliography ==
- Stafford, D.M. (1967). Te Arawa: A History of the Arawa People. Rotorua, New Zealand: A.H. & A.W. Reed.
- Wright, Kereama (21 April 2019). "Wharenui opens after 40 years". Te Ao Māori News.
