= Rotokawa =

Rotokawa may refer to:

- Rotokawa, Bay of Plenty in Rotorua District, Bay of Plenty Region, New Zealand
- Rotokawa, Waikato in Taupō District, Waikato Region, New Zealand
