= Maungatapu, Tauranga =

Suburb of Tauranga, New Zealand

Maungatapu
- Suburb
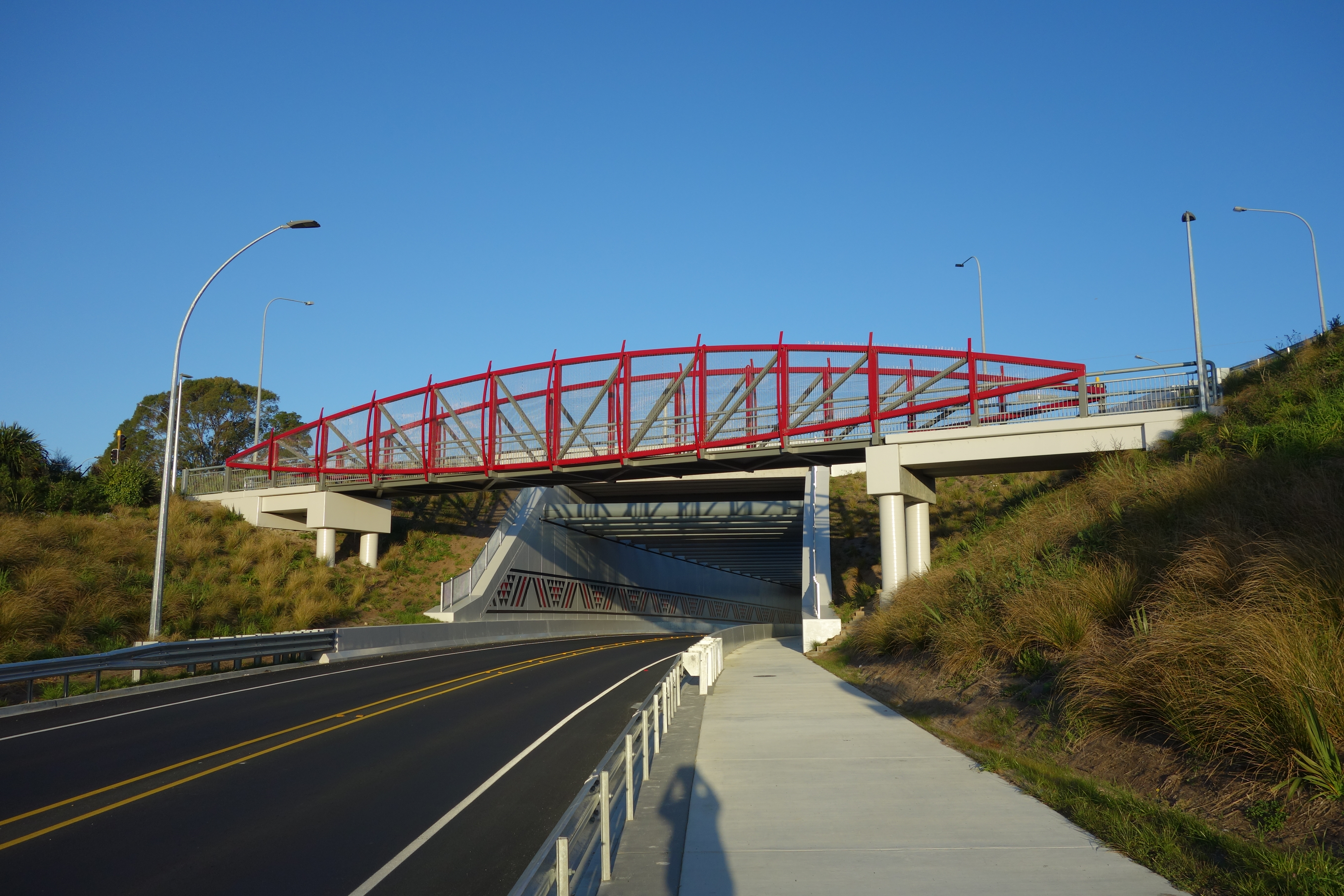
- Shared pathway bridge adjacent to the Maungatapu roundabout
- Interactive map of Maungatapu
- Coordinates: 37.721844°S 176.174029°E
- Country: New Zealand
- City: Tauranga
- Local authority: Tauranga City Council
- Electoral ward: Welcome Bay General Ward

Area
  - Land: 168 ha (420 acres)

Population (June 2025)
  - Total: 2,960
  - Density: 1,760/km^{2} (4,560/sq mi)

| | (Tauranga Harbour) | Matapihi |
| | Maungatapu | (Rangataua Bay) |
| Hairini | Welcome Bay |

Maungatapu is a suburb and peninsula of Tauranga in the Bay of Plenty region of New Zealand's North Island. It is north-east of Hairini and south-east of Matapihi.

The Maungatapu Peninsula and Matapihi Peninsula are connected by the Maungatapu Bridge. State Highway 29A runs through both suburbs.

== Demographics ==
Maungatapu covers 1.68 km^{2} (0.65 sq mi) and had an estimated population of 2,960 as of June 2025, with a population density of 1,762 people per km^{2}.

Historical population
| Year | Pop. | ±% p.a. |
|---|---|---|
| 2006 | 2,625 | — |
| 2013 | 2,676 | +0.28% |
| 2018 | 2,892 | +1.56% |
| 2023 | 2,883 | −0.06% |

Maungatapu had a population of 2,883 in the 2023 New Zealand census, a decrease of 9 people (−0.3%) since the 2018 census, and an increase of 207 people (7.7%) since the 2013 census. There were 1,443 males, 1,428 females, and 9 people of other genders in 1,047 dwellings. 2.6% of people identified as LGBTIQ+. The median age was 41.5 years (compared with 38.1 years nationally). There were 495 people (17.2%) aged under 15 years, 507 (17.6%) aged 15 to 29, 1,299 (45.1%) aged 30 to 64, and 582 (20.2%) aged 65 or older.

People could identify as more than one ethnicity. The results were 80.0% European (Pākehā); 26.4% Māori; 3.0% Pasifika; 6.2% Asian; 1.1% Middle Eastern, Latin American and African New Zealanders (MELAA); and 1.9% other, which includes people giving their ethnicity as "New Zealander". English was spoken by 96.6%, Māori by 7.4%, Samoan by 0.6%, and other languages by 8.8%. No language could be spoken by 2.0% (e.g. too young to talk). New Zealand Sign Language was known by 0.4%. The percentage of people born overseas was 19.5, compared with 28.8% nationally.

Religious affiliations were 29.8% Christian, 0.8% Hindu, 0.2% Islam, 5.2% Māori religious beliefs, 0.6% Buddhist, 0.3% New Age, and 2.1% other religions. People who answered that they had no religion were 54.6%, and 6.5% of people did not answer the census question.

Of those at least 15 years old, 510 (21.4%) people had a bachelor's or higher degree, 1,395 (58.4%) had a post-high school certificate or diploma, and 486 (20.4%) people exclusively held high school qualifications. The median income was $44,100, compared with $41,500 nationally. 279 people (11.7%) earned over $100,000 compared to 12.1% nationally. The employment status of those at least 15 was 1,236 (51.8%) full-time, 318 (13.3%) part-time, and 69 (2.9%) unemployed.

== Marae ==
The local Opopoti Marae and Wairakewa meeting house is a meeting place for the Ngāi Te Rangi hapū of Ngāti He.

== Education ==
Te Kura o Maungatapu — Maungatapu School is a co-educational state primary school for Year 1 to 6 students, with a roll of 596 as of July 2025. It provides dual-medium education in English and full-immersion Māori. It opened in 1883 as Maungatapu Native School. The school closed in 1889 because all the students went to the school at Ngapeke (Welcome Bay), but reopened in 1890. It closed again in 1895, and reopened on a new site in 1913. In 1962, Maungatapu Maori School was disestablished and a new school opened. The school became officially bilingual in 1988.
