= Waiohau =

Waiohau Waiōhau
- Town
- Interactive map of Waiohau
- Coordinates: 38.226°S 176.840°E
- Country: New Zealand
- Region: Bay of Plenty
- Territorial authority: Whakatāne District
- Ward: Te Uruwera General Ward
- Community: Murupara Community
- Electorates: East Cape; Waiariki (Māori)

Government
  - Territorial authority: Whakatāne District Council
  - Regional council: Bay of Plenty Regional Council
  - Mayor of Whakatāne: Nándor Tánczos
  - East Cape MP: Dana Kirkpatrick
  - Waiariki MP: Rawiri Waititi

Area
  - Total: 143.80 km^{2} (55.52 sq mi)

Population (2023 Census)
  - Total: 180
  - Density: 1.3/km^{2} (3.2/sq mi)

Waiohau or Waiōhau is a rural valley in the Whakatāne District and Bay of Plenty region of New Zealand's North Island, north of Murupara and south of Lake Matahina.

== Marae ==
The Waiōhau Marae, located on the eastern boundary of Te Urewera National Park, is a traditional meeting ground for the hapū of Ngāti Haka and Patuheuheu, of the iwi of Tūhoe. It connects ancestrally to Te Urewera, the maunga (mountain) of Hikurangi and the awa (river) of Rangitaiki.

The wharenui (meeting house), Tama ki Hikurangi, was built between 1870 and 1909.

A new wharekai (dining hall) opened at the marae in March 2015. Jacinda Ardern was originally expected to open the building, but was unable due to other commitments. Fellow Labour MPs Peeni Henare, Tāmati Coffey and Kiritapu Allan attended in her place, and Ardern committed to visit at a later date.

== History ==
The first education in Waiohau was provided by Presbyterian missionaries. A school opened in Waiohau in May 1918.

A memorial was installed at the school after World War II, honouring the 28th Māori Battalion soldier Paora Rua, who was killed in Crete on 23 May 1941. It features a painted wooden carving of a soldier, a concrete obelisk, a carved flag pole and two marble plaques. One is inscribed with the words: "In memory of Paora Rua, killed in action, Crete, May 23rd 1941, aged 28." The other reads: "By this memorial remember and honour Paora Rua, who died for his country."

As of 1956, the community consisted of about 200 members of Patuheuheu, living peacefully with a small number of Pākehā. It had four churches, including large Ringatū and Presbyterian churches. Many arts and crafts were still being passed on between generations, including the skills of whakairo.

A bronze plaque was added to school's war memorial during its jubilee celebrations in April 1968, acknowledging the original gift of land for the school.

Ngāti Manawa restricted access to the valley during the 2020 coronavirus pandemic.

== Demographics ==
Waiohau valley covers 143.80 km^{2} (55.52 sq mi). It is part of the Galatea statistical area.

Historical population
Year	Pop.	±% p.a.
2013	123	—
2018	156	+4.87%
2023	180	+2.90%

Waiohau valley had a population of 180 in the 2023 New Zealand census, an increase of 24 people (15.4%) since the 2018 census, and an increase of 57 people (46.3%) since the 2013 census. There were 87 males and 90 females in 66 dwellings. The median age was 37.7 years (compared with 38.1 years nationally). There were 42 people (23.3%) aged under 15 years, 30 (16.7%) aged 15 to 29, 78 (43.3%) aged 30 to 64, and 24 (13.3%) aged 65 or older.

People could identify as more than one ethnicity. The results were 38.3% European (Pākehā), 73.3% Māori, and 1.7% Pasifika. English was spoken by 93.3%, Māori by 36.7%, and other languages by 1.7%. No language could be spoken by 5.0% (e.g. too young to talk). The percentage of people born overseas was 6.7, compared with 28.8% nationally.

Religious affiliations were 20.0% Christian, 1.7% Hindu, 25.0% Māori religious beliefs, 1.7% New Age, and 1.7% other religions. People who answered that they had no religion were 46.7%, and 8.3% of people did not answer the census question.

Of those at least 15 years old, 18 (13.0%) people had a bachelor's or higher degree, 75 (54.3%) had a post-high school certificate or diploma, and 48 (34.8%) people exclusively held high school qualifications. The median income was $30,300, compared with $41,500 nationally. 3 people (2.2%) earned over $100,000 compared to 12.1% nationally. The employment status of those at least 15 was 45 (32.6%) full-time, 21 (15.2%) part-time, and 9 (6.5%) unemployed.

== Education ==
Te Kura Maori-a-Rohe o Waiohau is a co-educational state Māori language immersion area school, educating students from Year 1 to Year 13, with a roll of 87 as of July 2026. The school opened in 1893 at Te Houhī, and reopened at Waiohau in 1918.
