= Horohoro, New Zealand =

Coordinates: 38°15′00″S 176°09′25″E

Horohoro is a rural farming community 15 kilometres (9.3 mi) southwest of Rotorua, New Zealand. Horohoro is a flat-topped mountain with perpendicular cliffs and is a prominent landmark in the Rotorua area associated geologically with the Horohoro Fault and Kapenga Caldera. It is the traditional home of the Ngāti Kea Ngāti Tuarā people. The Ngāti Kea Ngāti Tuarā ancestral story tells of an incident in which Kahumatamomoe, a Te Arawa chief, washed his hands in a stream at the northern end of the Horohoro mountain. Following this story, the full name of the mountain is Te Horohoroinga-o-ngā-ringa-o-Kahumatamomoe (Washing of Kahumatamomoe's hands).

The 1929 land development project by Āpirana Ngata proposed the building of farms on Māori land. Horohoro was among the first areas addressed by the plan and migrants came to work on the project.

== Marae ==
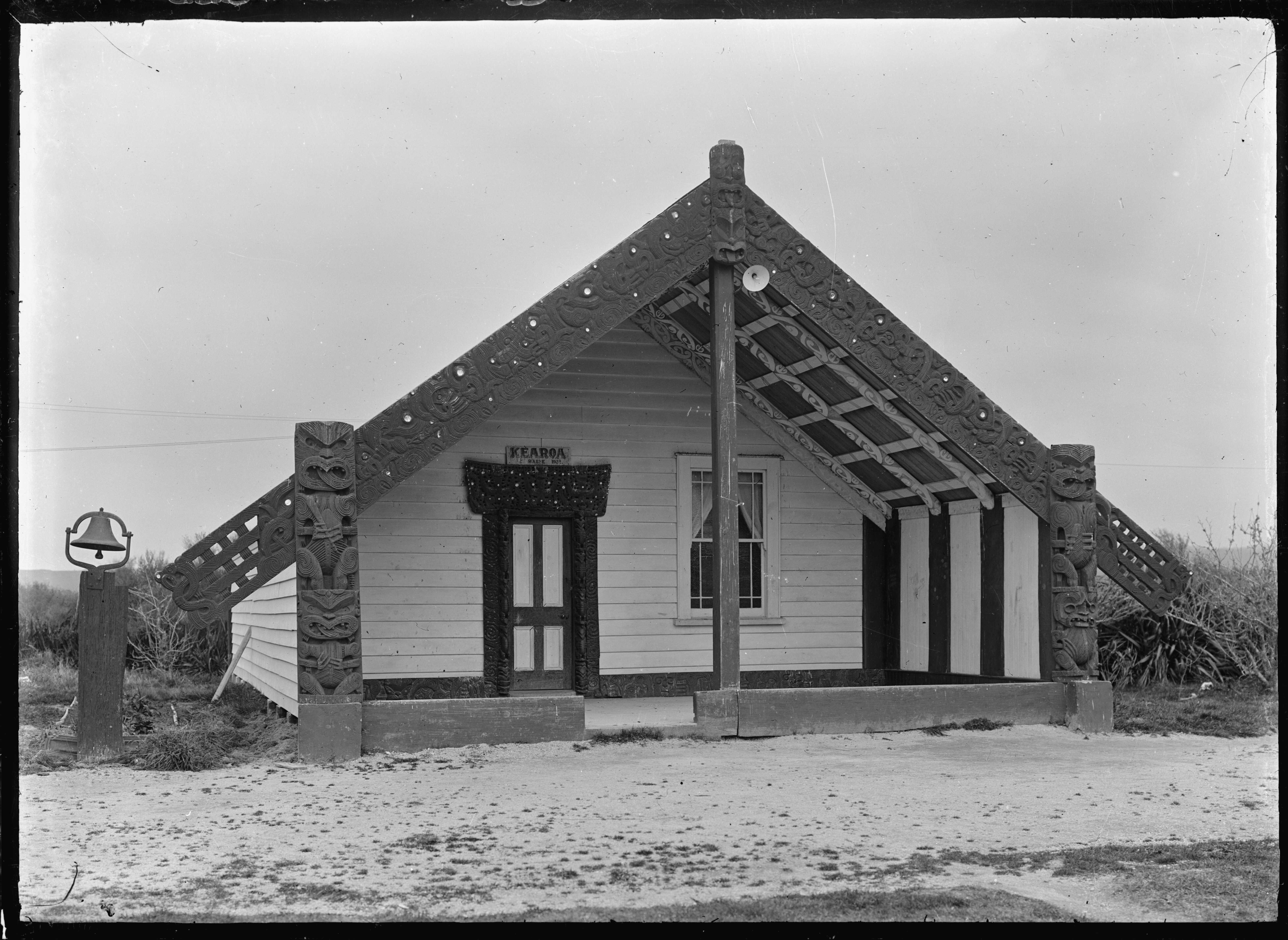
Kearoa meeting house in Tarewa, where it was relocated, before being returned to Horohoro

Horohoro has two maraes belonging to Ngāti Kea Ngāti Tuarā:

- Kearoa Marae, and
- Rongomaipapa Marae

Rongomaipapa Marae is also affiliated with Tūhourangi and Ngāti Kahungunu.

== Education ==
Horohoro School is a co-educational state primary school for Year 1 to 8 students with a roll of 42 students as of July 2025.
