= Poroporo, New Zealand =

Poroporo
- Rural community
- Interactive map of Poroporo
- Coordinates: 37.978°S 176.960°E
- Country: New Zealand
- Region: Bay of Plenty
- Territorial authority: Whakatāne District
- Ward: Rangitāiki General Ward
- Community: Rangitāiki Community
- Electorates: East Cape; Waiariki (Māori)

Government
  - Territorial authority: Whakatāne District Council
  - Regional council: Bay of Plenty Regional Council
  - Mayor of Whakatāne: Nándor Tánczos
  - East Cape MP: Dana Kirkpatrick
  - Waiariki MP: Rawiri Waititi

Area
  - Total: 57.65 km^{2} (22.26 sq mi)

Population (2023 Census)
  - Total: 909
  - Density: 15.8/km^{2} (40.8/sq mi)

Poroporo is a rural community in the Whakatāne District and Bay of Plenty Region of New Zealand's North Island. It is located south-west of Whakatāne, inland from the settlement.

According to Te Whare Wānanga o Awanuiārangi, the Māori language is the "primary language of social engagement" in Poroporo.

Poroporo has its own rugby and sports club, which plays home games on a dedicated rugby field.

== History and culture ==
=== History ===
Ngāti Awa elder, soldier and community leader Peter Mason was born in the area in 1943. He was brought up in a simple, dirt-floor home on a small pā. His family worked for local farmers, grew their own crops and fished in the nearby river before it was dammed to irrigate new farms. Mason spoke Māori exclusively until beginning at the local Poroporo Native School.

A man died in a house fire in Poroporo in September 2018.

=== Marae ===
Poroporo is in the rohe (tribal area) of Ngāti Awa. It has several marae, which are meeting grounds of Ngāti Awa hapū:

- Pūkeko Marae and Pūkeko meeting house is affiliated with Ngāti Pūkeko.
- Rangataua Marae and Rangataua meeting house is affiliated with Ngāti Rangataua.
- Rangimarie Marae and Rarawhati meeting house is affiliated with Te Whānau o Tariao Tapuke.
- Rewatu Marae and Ueimua meeting house is affiliated with Ngāi Tamapare.

In October 2020, the Government committed $4,871,246 from the Provincial Growth Fund to upgrade Pūkeko, Rangataua, Rewatu and 9 other Ngāti Awa marae, creating 23 jobs.

== Demographics ==
Poroporo covers 57.65 km^{2} (22.26 sq mi). It is part of the Thornton-Awakeri statistical area.

Historical population
Year	Pop.	±% p.a.
2013	783	—
2018	870	+2.13%
2023	909	+0.88%

Poroporo had a population of 909 in the 2023 New Zealand census, an increase of 39 people (4.5%) since the 2018 census, and an increase of 126 people (16.1%) since the 2013 census. There were 447 males, 453 females, and 3 people of other genders in 294 dwellings. 1.7% of people identified as LGBTIQ+. There were 183 people (20.1%) aged under 15 years, 147 (16.2%) aged 15 to 29, 417 (45.9%) aged 30 to 64, and 150 (16.5%) aged 65 or older.

People could identify as more than one ethnicity. The results were 65.3% European (Pākehā), 53.1% Māori, 3.3% Pasifika, 1.7% Asian, and 1.3% other, which includes people giving their ethnicity as "New Zealander". English was spoken by 96.7%, Māori by 17.5%, Samoan by 0.3%, and other languages by 3.6%. No language could be spoken by 1.3% (e.g. too young to talk). New Zealand Sign Language was known by 0.3%. The percentage of people born overseas was 8.3, compared with 28.8% nationally.

Religious affiliations were 26.4% Christian, 6.6% Māori religious beliefs, 0.3% Buddhist, 0.7% New Age, and 1.0% other religions. People who answered that they had no religion were 59.7%, and 6.6% of people did not answer the census question.

Of those at least 15 years old, 123 (16.9%) people had a bachelor's or higher degree, 420 (57.9%) had a post-high school certificate or diploma, and 165 (22.7%) people exclusively held high school qualifications. 66 people (9.1%) earned over $100,000 compared to 12.1% nationally. The employment status of those at least 15 was 348 (47.9%) full-time, 126 (17.4%) part-time, and 27 (3.7%) unemployed.
