= Coastlands =

Township in Bay of Plenty Region, New Zealand

- Township
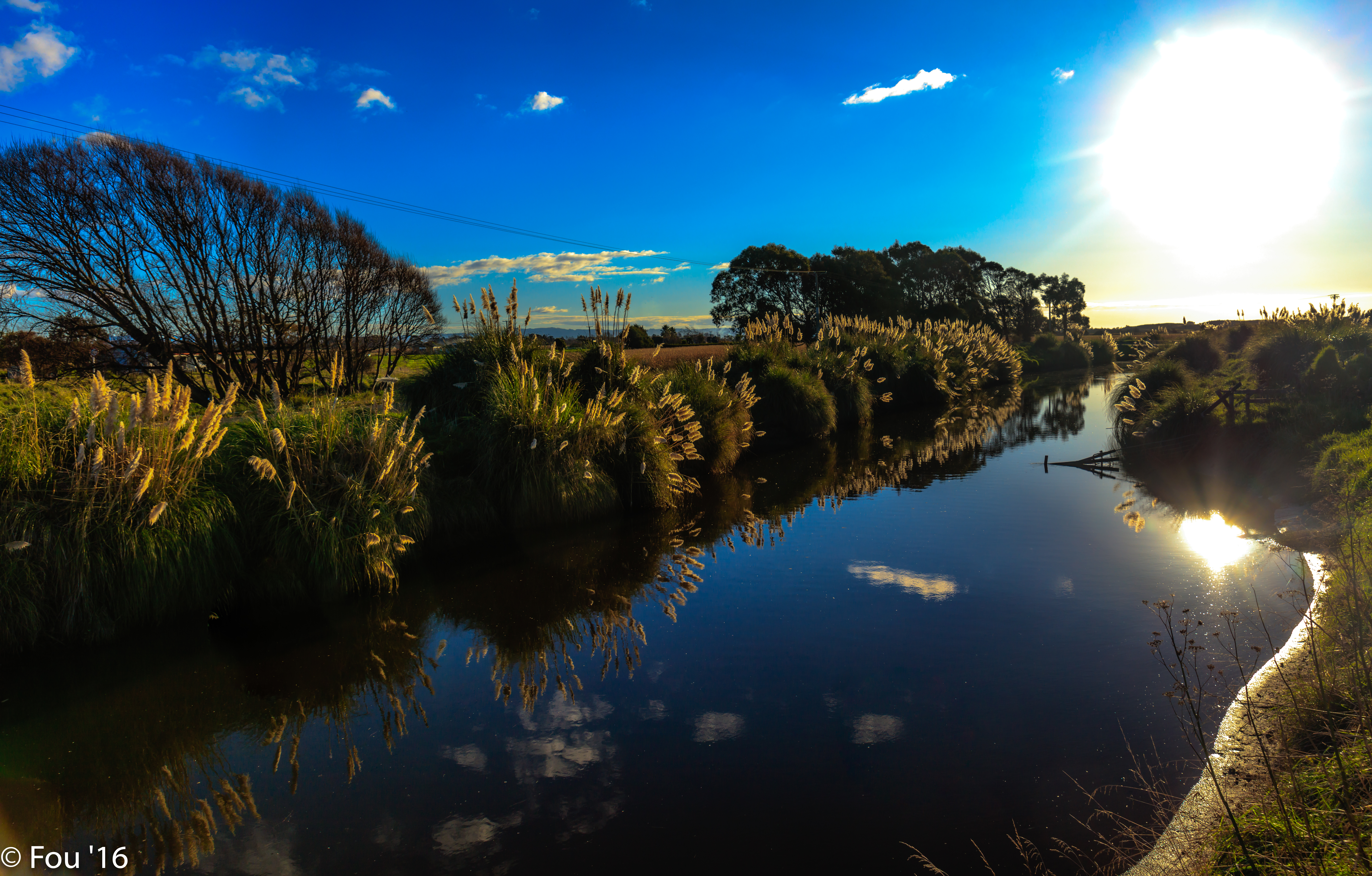
- Sunset colours along the Orini Stream
- Interactive map of Coastlands
- Coordinates: 37.934618°S 176.973328°E
- Country: New Zealand
- Region: Bay of Plenty
- Territorial authority: Whakatāne District
- Ward: Whakatāne-Ōhope General Ward
- Community: Whakatāne-Ōhope Community
- Electorates: East Cape; Waiariki (Māori)

Government
  - Territorial authority: Whakatāne District Council
  - Regional council: Bay of Plenty Regional Council
  - Mayor of Whakatāne: Nándor Tánczos
  - East Cape MP: Dana Kirkpatrick
  - Waiariki MP: Rawiri Waititi

Area
  - Total: 1.36 km^{2} (0.53 sq mi)

Population (2023 Census)
  - Total: 1,332
  - Density: 979/km^{2} (2,540/sq mi)

Coastlands is a beach settlement in the Whakatāne District and Bay of Plenty Region of New Zealand's North Island. It is located north of Whakatāne, directly across the Whakatāne River.

== History and culture ==
=== Lady on the Rock ===
According to tradition, when the Mataatua waka first arrived at Whakatāne from Hawaiki 600 years ago, the men left the women alone in the canoe while they went to visit the shore. The canoe started to drift back out to sea. Wairaka, the daughter of captain-navigator Toroa, seized the paddle, and brought the waka back to shore. She forbade the tapu forbidding women to handle canoes, shouting "Kia Whakatane au i ahau", translating as "I will act the part of a man"; this phrase is the origin of Whakatāne's name.

Other traditions suggest it was Muriwai, Toroa's sister, who had brought the canoe to shore.

The Lady on the Rock statue, a bronze statue at the top of the Turuturu Rock at the mouth of the Whakatane River, commemorates the bravery of Wairaka. It was unveiled in 1965 as a memorial to the wife of Sir William Sullivan.

=== Local Māori ===
The area is within the rohe (tribal area) of the Ngāti Awa iwi. It is the site of a urupa, or graveyard, which is still used by Ngāti Awa.

The local hapū, Ngāi Taiwhakaea II, has a marae called Taiwhakaea and a meeting house called Taiwhakaea II.

In October 2020, the Government committed $305,099 from the Provincial Growth Fund to upgrade the marae. The upgrade was expected to create 8 jobs.

=== Recent history ===
There was an attempted robbery of a berry farm and cafe in Coastlands in February 2017. There were 60 customers and 15 staff inside at the cafe at the time, but only two people were injured.

A 7.44-hectare (18.4-acre) farming block was opened for development in November 2018. A planning permission application was filed in December 2019 to build a beachside retirement village on the site.

A tsunami siren is located at Coastlands.

== Demographics ==
Coastlands settlement covers 1.36 km^{2} (0.53 sq mi). It is part of the Coastlands statistical area.

Historical population for Coastlands settlement
Year	Pop.	±% p.a.
2006	852	—
2013	927	+1.21%
2018	1,113	+3.72%
2023	1,332	+3.66%
The 2006 population is for a larger area of 2.89 km^{2}. Source:

The settlement had a population of 1,332 in the 2023 New Zealand census, an increase of 219 people (19.7%) since the 2018 census, and an increase of 405 people (43.7%) since the 2013 census. There were 675 males, 654 females, and 6 people of other genders in 465 dwellings. 1.4% of people identified as LGBTIQ+. There were 276 people (20.7%) aged under 15 years, 180 (13.5%) aged 15 to 29, 630 (47.3%) aged 30 to 64, and 243 (18.2%) aged 65 or older.

People could identify as more than one ethnicity. The results were 83.6% European (Pākehā); 23.9% Māori; 2.5% Pasifika; 5.6% Asian; 0.9% Middle Eastern, Latin American and African New Zealanders (MELAA); and 1.8% other, which includes people giving their ethnicity as "New Zealander". English was spoken by 96.8%, Māori by 6.5%, and other languages by 9.0%. No language could be spoken by 2.0% (e.g. too young to talk). New Zealand Sign Language was known by 0.2%. The percentage of people born overseas was 22.1, compared with 28.8% nationally.

Religious affiliations were 30.2% Christian, 0.5% Hindu, 2.3% Māori religious beliefs, 0.9% Buddhist, 0.2% New Age, and 1.6% other religions. People who answered that they had no religion were 57.0%, and 7.0% of people did not answer the census question.

Of those at least 15 years old, 261 (24.7%) people had a bachelor's or higher degree, 600 (56.8%) had a post-high school certificate or diploma, and 189 (17.9%) people exclusively held high school qualifications. 189 people (17.9%) earned over $100,000 compared to 12.1% nationally. The employment status of those at least 15 was 558 (52.8%) full-time, 153 (14.5%) part-time, and 15 (1.4%) unemployed.

=== Coastlands statistical area ===
Coastlands statistical area covers 15.28 km^{2} (5.90 sq mi) and had an estimated population of 2,360 as of June 2025, with a population density of 154 people per km^{2}. Statistics New Zealand includes Coastlands in the Whakatāne urban area.

Historical population for the statistical area
Year	Pop.	±% p.a.
2006	1,479	—
2013	1,500	+0.20%
2018	1,776	+3.44%
2023	2,223	+4.59%

The statistical area had a population of 2,223 in the 2023 New Zealand census, an increase of 447 people (25.2%) since the 2018 census, and an increase of 723 people (48.2%) since the 2013 census. There were 1,122 males, 1,101 females, and 6 people of other genders in 711 dwellings. 1.8% of people identified as LGBTIQ+. The median age was 38.7 years (compared with 38.1 years nationally). There were 492 people (22.1%) aged under 15 years, 354 (15.9%) aged 15 to 29, 1,029 (46.3%) aged 30 to 64, and 348 (15.7%) aged 65 or older.

People could identify as more than one ethnicity. The results were 67.3% European (Pākehā); 41.8% Māori; 3.2% Pasifika; 6.6% Asian; 0.5% Middle Eastern, Latin American and African New Zealanders (MELAA); and 1.6% other, which includes people giving their ethnicity as "New Zealander". English was spoken by 95.7%, Māori by 15.2%, Samoan by 0.1%, and other languages by 8.2%. No language could be spoken by 2.3% (e.g. too young to talk). New Zealand Sign Language was known by 0.3%. The percentage of people born overseas was 18.4, compared with 28.8% nationally.

Religious affiliations were 28.3% Christian, 0.7% Hindu, 0.1% Islam, 9.7% Māori religious beliefs, 0.5% Buddhist, 0.1% New Age, and 1.6% other religions. People who answered that they had no religion were 52.2%, and 7.0% of people did not answer the census question.

Of those at least 15 years old, 369 (21.3%) people had a bachelor's or higher degree, 975 (56.3%) had a post-high school certificate or diploma, and 387 (22.4%) people exclusively held high school qualifications. The median income was $42,200, compared with $41,500 nationally. 237 people (13.7%) earned over $100,000 compared to 12.1% nationally. The employment status of those at least 15 was 876 (50.6%) full-time, 246 (14.2%) part-time, and 54 (3.1%) unemployed.

== Education ==
Te Kura Kaupapa Māori o Te Orini ki Ngati Awa is a co-educational state Māori language immersion primary school for Year 1 to 8 students, with a roll of 96 as of July 2026. It opened in 2013.
