= Paroa, Bay of Plenty =

Paroa
- Location within North Island
- Coordinates: 37.9495°S 176.9314°E
- Country: New Zealand
- Region: Bay of Plenty Region
- District: Whakatāne District

Paroa is a rural locality situated near Whakatāne in the Bay of Plenty region of New Zealand. The small, predominantly Māori community is located along State Highway 30, and contains a school and a sports rugby club.

The New Zealand Ministry for Culture and Heritage gives a translation of "broad fortified village" for Pāroa.

== Marae ==
Puawairua Marae, located in Paroa, is a traditional meeting ground for the Ngāti Awa hapū of Ngāti Hikakino.

In October 2020, the Government committed $4,871,246 from the Provincial Growth Fund to upgrade Puawairua Marae and 11 other Ngāti Awa marae, creating 23 jobs.

== Education ==
Te Kura o Te Paroa is a co-educational state Māori language immersion primary school for Year 1 to 8 students, with a roll of 288 as of July 2026.
