= Rotokawa, Bay of Plenty =

Rural community in Waikato, New Zealand

Coordinates: 38.10574°S 176.32373°E

Rotokawa is a rural community in the Rotorua District and the Bay of Plenty region of New Zealand's North Island.

The New Zealand Ministry for Culture and Heritage gives a translation of "bitter lake" for Rotokawa.

== Marae ==
The suburb has two Te Ure o Uenukukōpako marae:

- Ruamatā Marae and Uenukukōpako meeting house is a meeting place for the hapū of Ngati Te Kanawa.
- Pikirangi Marae and Ohomairangi meeting house is a meeting place of hapū of Ngāti Hauora. In October 2020, the Government committed $4,525,104 from the Provincial Growth Fund to upgrade Pikirangi Marae and Poukani Marae, creating 34 jobs.
