= Ngāti Rongomai =

Māori iwi (tribe) in Aotearoa (New Zealand)

- Iwi (tribe) in Māoridom
- Rohe (region): Rotorua Lakes District
- Waka (canoe): Arawa
- Website: rongomai.iwi.nz

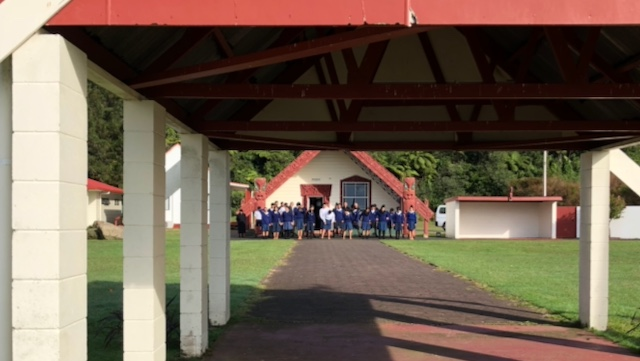
Students of the Te Wharekura o Ngati Rongomai school offer a traditional haka and powhiri to visitors to the Tapuaekura a Hatupatu Marae

Ngāti Rongomai is a Māori iwi of New Zealand. They claim descent from Rangitihi's children Rakeiao, Kawatapuārangi and Apumoana, who came to reside on the southern shores of Lake Rotoiti. They are part of the greater Te Arawa confederation, descendants of the Māori people who arrived in New Zealand aboard the Arawa canoe.

The Ngāti Rongomai Iwi Trust was established in 2007 to serve the interests of Ngāti Rongomai iwi, and maintains several marae in the Rotoiti community in New Zealand's Bay of Plenty region, including the Ruato Marae and Ngā Pūmanawa e Waru meeting house, and the Tapuaekura a Hatupatu Marae and meeting house.

Additionally, they share the Te Waiiti Marae and Hinekura meeting house in Rotoiti and the Waiatuhi Marae and Kahumatamomoe meeting house in neighbouring Mourea with fellow Te Arawa iwi.

Te Wharekura o Ngāti Rongomai, a Māori language immersion school for the Ngāti Rongomai community was opened in Rotorua in 2009. In 2019, the kapa haka group Te Pikikōtuku o Ngāti Rongomai, formed from members of Ngāti Rongomai, placed second at Te Matatini.

== See also ==
- List of Māori iwi
