= Omaio =

- Locality
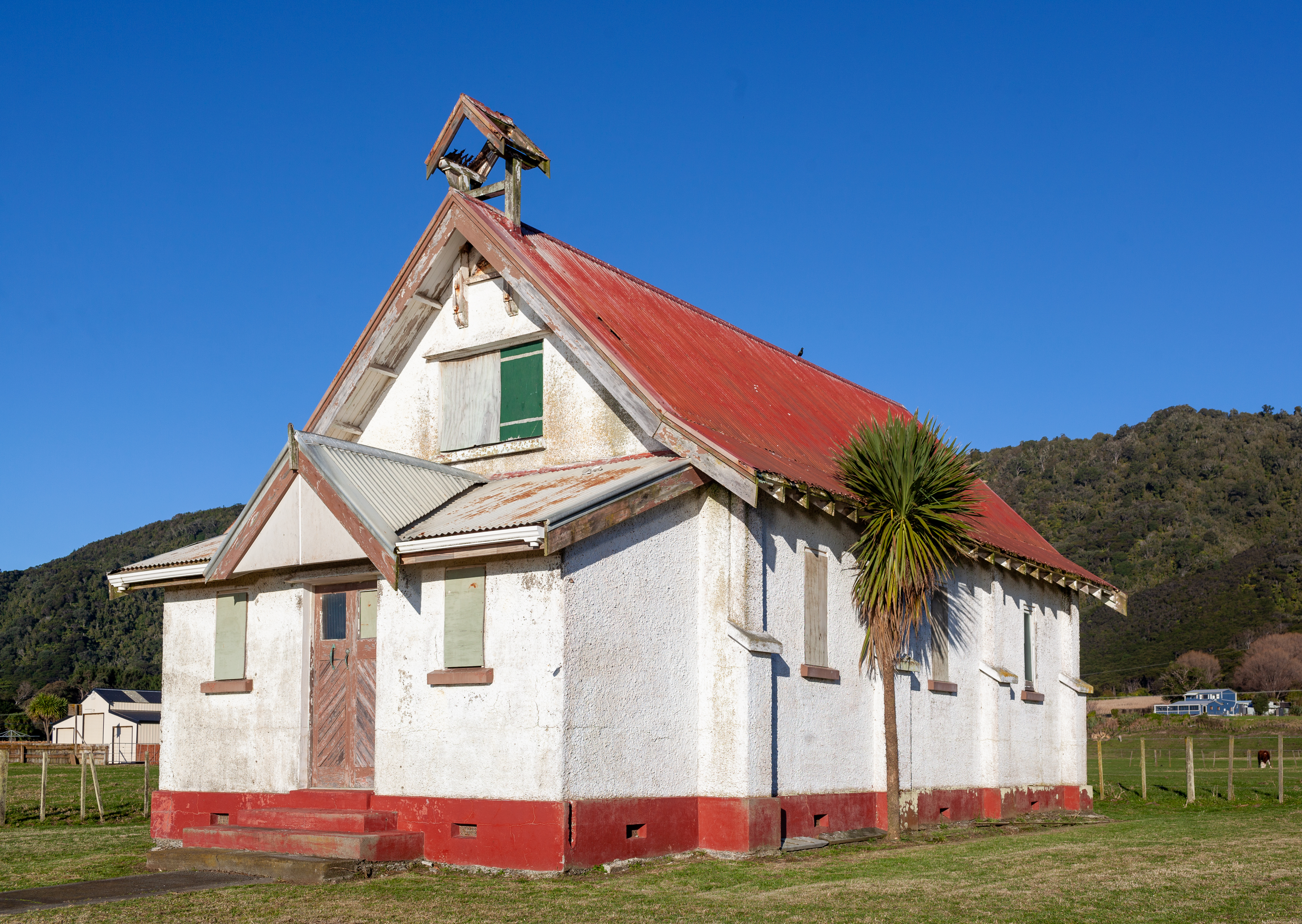
- Omaio Soldiers' Memorial Church
- Interactive map of Omaio
- Coordinates: 37.816°S 177.629°E
- Country: New Zealand
- Region: Bay of Plenty
- Territorial authority: Ōpōtiki District
- Ward: Coast
- Community: Coast Community
- Electorates: East Cape; Waiariki

Government
  - Territorial authority: Ōpōtiki District Council
  - Regional council: Bay of Plenty Regional Council
  - Mayor of Ōpōtiki: David Moore
  - East Cape MP: Dana Kirkpatrick
  - Waiariki MP: Rawiri Waititi

Area
  - Total: 105.41 km^{2} (40.70 sq mi)

Population (2023 Census)
  - Total: 234
  - Density: 2.22/km^{2} (5.75/sq mi)
- Time zone: UTC+12 (NZST)
  - Summer (DST): UTC+13 (NZDT)
- Postcode: 3199
- Area code: 07

Omaio is a coastal township in the Ōpōtiki District and Bay of Plenty Region of New Zealand's North Island.

During the 20th century, families collectively farmed the area for sheep and beef. More recently, they have been considering a shift to kiwifruit farming. Funding was granted for a pilot kiwifruit farm in April 2017.

During 2018 and 2019, National Institute of Water and Atmospheric Research tested climate-resilient crops in Omaio. Due to the impact of climate change, Omaio has had fewer frosts, shorter winters, drier summers, more extreme weather, and greater pressure on its water supplies.

In June 2019, Omaio hosted an historic signing of a Treaty of Waitangi settlement agreement between Te Whānau-ā-Apanui and the Crown.

== Demographics ==
Omaio and its surrounds cover 105.41 km^{2} (40.70 sq mi). Omaio is part of the larger Cape Runaway statistical area.

Historical population
| Year | Pop. | ±% p.a. |
|---|---|---|
| 2006 | 198 | — |
| 2013 | 183 | −1.12% |
| 2018 | 171 | −1.35% |
| 2023 | 234 | +6.47% |

Omaio and its surrounds had a population of 234 in the 2023 New Zealand census, an increase of 63 people (36.8%) since the 2018 census, and an increase of 51 people (27.9%) since the 2013 census. There were 120 males and 114 females in 81 dwellings. 1.3% of people identified as LGBTIQ+. The median age was 45.8 years (compared with 38.1 years nationally). There were 39 people (16.7%) aged under 15 years, 36 (15.4%) aged 15 to 29, 108 (46.2%) aged 30 to 64, and 51 (21.8%) aged 65 or older.

People could identify as more than one ethnicity. The results were 20.5% European (Pākehā), 89.7% Māori, 3.8% Pasifika, 1.3% Asian, and 2.6% other, which includes people giving their ethnicity as "New Zealander". English was spoken by 96.2%, Māori by 43.6%, and other languages by 1.3%. No language could be spoken by 1.3% (e.g. too young to talk). The percentage of people born overseas was 7.7, compared with 28.8% nationally.

Religious affiliations were 25.6% Christian, and 46.2% Māori religious beliefs. People who answered that they had no religion were 26.9%, and 5.1% of people did not answer the census question.

Of those at least 15 years old, 30 (15.4%) people had a bachelor's or higher degree, 99 (50.8%) had a post-high school certificate or diploma, and 63 (32.3%) people exclusively held high school qualifications. The median income was $31,000, compared with $41,500 nationally. 9 people (4.6%) earned over $100,000 compared to 12.1% nationally. The employment status of those at least 15 was 75 (38.5%) full-time, 21 (10.8%) part-time, and 18 (9.2%) unemployed.

== Marae ==
The settlement has three marae of Te Whānau-ā-Apanui.

- Ōmāio Marae and Rongomaihuatahi meeting house is a meeting place for the hapū of Te Whānau a Nuku. In October 2020, the Government committed $1,646,820 from the Provincial Growth Fund to upgrade the marae and five others, creating 10 jobs.
- Ōtūwhare Marae and Te Poho o Rūtāia meeting house belongs to the hapū of Te Whānau a Rutaia.
- Whitianga Marae and Tūtawake meeting house belongs to the hapū of Te Whānau a Tutawake.

== Education ==
Te Kura o Ōmaio opened in 1871 and was amalgamated with Whānau-ā-Apanui Area School and Raukōkore School to Te Kura o Te Whānau-a-Apanui in 2015. Te Kura o Te Whānau-a-Apanui used the old school grounds in Omaio for the first few years until new premises were built in Te Kaha.

== Notable people ==
Rugby player Ruahei Demant lived in Omaio until the age of 12. She described the township as a "tiny place" in "the wops".
