= Hāwai =

Locality in Ōpōtiki District, Bay of Plenty Region, New Zealand

- Locality
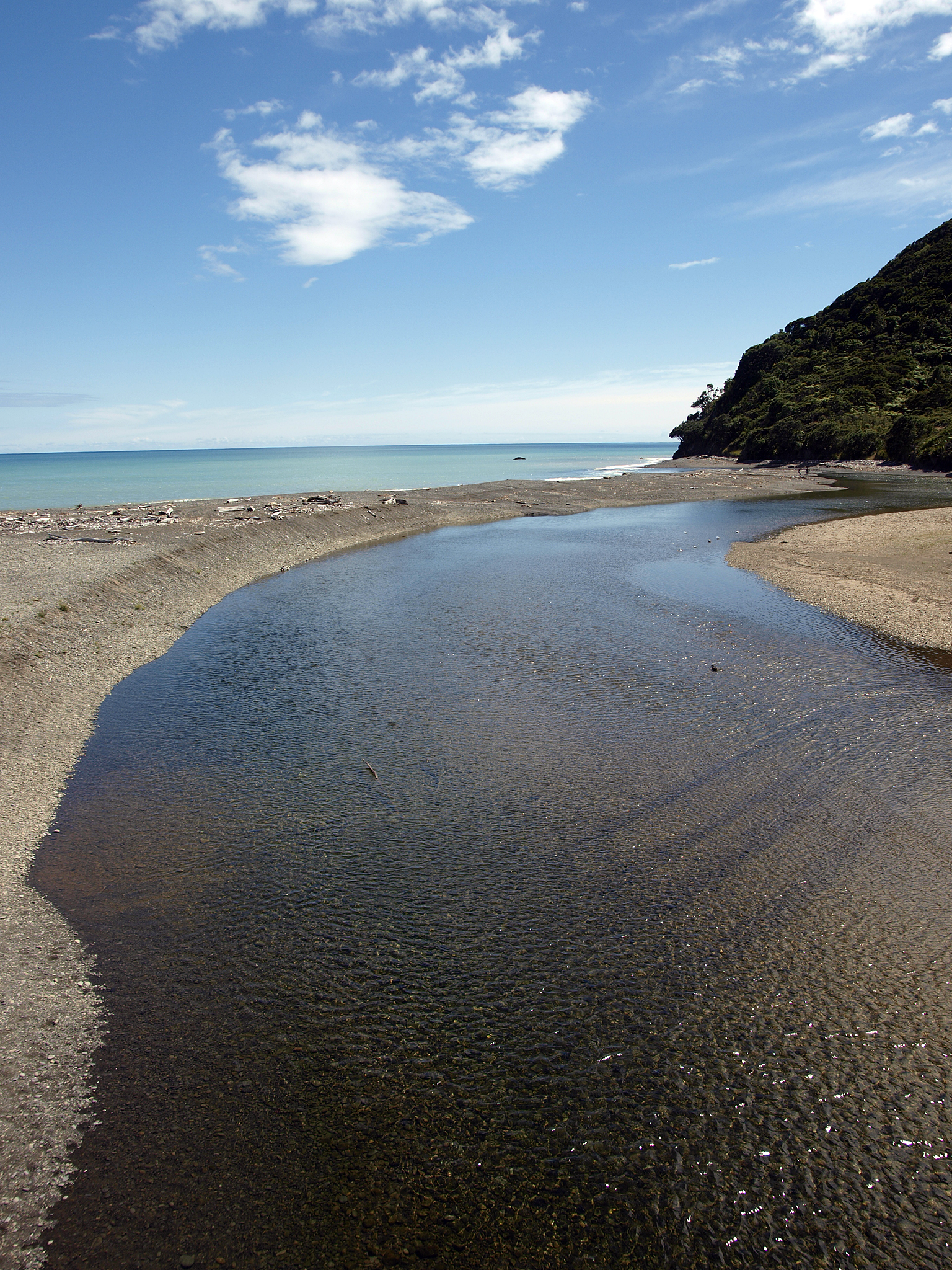
- Hāwai River mouth
- Interactive map of Hāwai
- Coordinates: 37.922°S 177.528°E
- Country: New Zealand
- Region: Bay of Plenty
- Territorial authority: Ōpōtiki District
- Ward: Coast
- Community: Coast Community
- Electorates: East Cape; Waiariki

Government
  - Territorial authority: Ōpōtiki District Council
  - Regional council: Bay of Plenty Regional Council
  - Mayor of Ōpōtiki: David Moore
  - East Cape MP: Dana Kirkpatrick
  - Waiariki MP: Rawiri Waititi

Area
  - Total: 85.95 km^{2} (33.19 sq mi)

Population (2023 Census)
  - Total: 126
  - Density: 1.47/km^{2} (3.80/sq mi)
- Time zone: UTC+12 (NZST)
  - Summer (DST): UTC+13 (NZDT)
- Postcode: 3197
- Area code: 07

Hāwai is a coastal settlement in the Ōpōtiki District and Bay of Plenty Region of New Zealand's North Island.

== History ==
Hāwai is in the rohe (traditional tribal area) of Te Whānau-ā-Apanui.

Sixteen Māori children and two adults drowned in 1900 while crossing the Motu River in a canoe in 1900 on their way to Ōmaio school.

A bridge was erected over the Motu River in 1929.

Te Whānau ā Apanui placed a rāhui on over 130 kilometres of coastline, west from Hāwai, following the 2019 Whakaari / White Island eruption.

During the 2020 coronavirus lockdown, Te Whānau-ā-Apanui set up road checkpoints to monitor and restrict travel into and through Hāwai. The restrictions were supported by Ōpōtiki District Council and New Zealand Police. According to The Guardian, the checkpoints operated 24 hours a day, unlike checkpoints set up by other iwi in other settlements.

The restrictions lasted 47 days, from 12 pm on 25 March until the delivery of a karakia at 12 pm on 11 May.

Te Whānau-ā-Apanui also set up initiatives during the lockdown to ensure elderly residents of Hāwai had access to essentials.

== Demographics ==
Hāwai and its surrounds, including Maraenui, cover 85.95 km^{2} (33.19 sq mi). Hāwai is part of the larger Cape Runaway statistical area.

Historical population
Year	Pop.	±% p.a.
2013	138	—
2018	102	−5.87%
2023	126	+4.32%

Hāwai had a population of 126 in the 2023 New Zealand census, an increase of 24 people (23.5%) since the 2018 census, and a decrease of 12 people (−8.7%) since the 2013 census. There were 72 males and 57 females in 57 dwellings. The median age was 45.6 years (compared with 38.1 years nationally). There were 18 people (14.3%) aged under 15 years, 21 (16.7%) aged 15 to 29, 60 (47.6%) aged 30 to 64, and 30 (23.8%) aged 65 or older.

People could identify as more than one ethnicity. The results were 35.7% European (Pākehā), 78.6% Māori, 7.1% Pasifika, and 2.4% Asian. English was spoken by 97.6%, Māori by 42.9%, and other languages by 2.4%. New Zealand Sign Language was known by 2.4%. The percentage of people born overseas was 2.4, compared with 28.8% nationally.

Religious affiliations were 26.2% Christian, 45.2% Māori religious beliefs, and 2.4% other religions. People who answered that they had no religion were 26.2%, and 7.1% of people did not answer the census question.

Of those at least 15 years old, 3 (2.8%) people had a bachelor's or higher degree, 66 (61.1%) had a post-high school certificate or diploma, and 39 (36.1%) people exclusively held high school qualifications. The median income was $26,500, compared with $41,500 nationally. 3 people (2.8%) earned over $100,000 compared to 12.1% nationally. The employment status of those at least 15 was 36 (33.3%) full-time, 15 (13.9%) part-time, and 12 (11.1%) unemployed.

== Marae ==
The settlement has two marae of Te Whānau-ā-Apanui.

- Maraenui Marae is a meeting place for the hapū of Te Whānau a Hikarukutai; its meeting house is called Te Iwarau.
- Tunapahore Marae is a meeting place for the hapū of Te Whānau a Haraawaka; its meeting house is called Haraawaka.

== Education ==
Te Kura Mana Maori Maraenui is a co-educational Māori language immersion state primary school for Year 1 to 8 students, with a roll of 32 as of July 2026 A Māori school opened at Maraenui in 1927.
