= Reporoa =

Rural settlement in Waikato Region, New Zealand

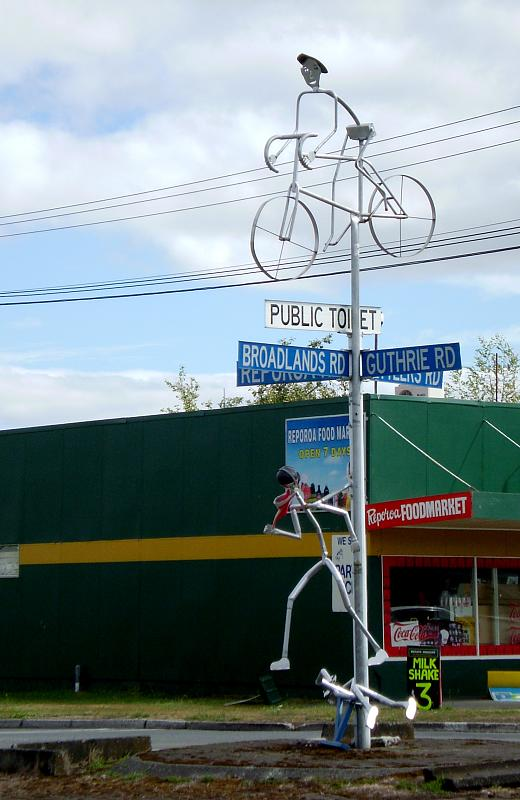
- Road sign and sculpture
- Interactive map of Reporoa
- Coordinates: 38.436003°S 176.340785°E
- Country: New Zealand
- Region: Waikato
- Territorial authority: Rotorua Lakes District
- Ward: Rotorua Rural General Ward
- Community: Rotorua Rural Community
- Electorates: Rotorua; Waiariki (Māori)

Government
  - Territorial authority: Rotorua Lakes Council
  - Regional council: Waikato Regional Council
  - Mayor of Rotorua: Tania Tapsell
  - Rotorua MP: Todd McClay
  - Waiariki MP: Rawiri Waititi

Area
  - Total: 15.66 km^{2} (6.05 sq mi)

Population (2023 Census)
  - Total: 321
  - Density: 20.5/km^{2} (53.1/sq mi)

Reporoa is a rural community in Rotorua Lakes within the Waikato region of New Zealand's North Island.

It is located within the Reporoa Caldera, a caldera in the Taupō Volcanic Zone containing the Deer Hill, Kairuru and Pukekahu rhyolitic lava domes and the active Reporoa geothermal field. Several hydrothermal explosions have occurred in the area, with a large one being recorded in 1948, and another large one occurring in a cow paddock in April 2005.

The New Zealand Ministry for Culture and Heritage gives a translation of "long swamp" for Reporoa.

== Demographics ==
Reporoa locality covers 15.66 km^{2} (6.05 sq mi). It is part of the Golden Springs statistical area.

Historical population of Reporoa
Year	Pop.	±% p.a.
2006	330	—
2013	279	−2.37%
2018	279	+0.00%
2023	321	+2.84%

Reporoa had a population of 321 in the 2023 New Zealand census, an increase of 42 people (15.1%) since the 2018 census, and an increase of 42 people (15.1%) since the 2013 census. There were 177 males, 147 females, and 3 people of other genders in 114 dwellings. 1.9% of people identified as LGBTIQ+. There were 72 people (22.4%) aged under 15 years, 57 (17.8%) aged 15 to 29, 153 (47.7%) aged 30 to 64, and 39 (12.1%) aged 65 or older.

People could identify as more than one ethnicity. The results were 58.9% European (Pākehā); 46.7% Māori; 1.9% Pasifika; 7.5% Asian; 0.9% Middle Eastern, Latin American and African New Zealanders (MELAA); and 2.8% other, which includes people giving their ethnicity as "New Zealander". English was spoken by 98.1%, Māori by 9.3%, and other languages by 3.7%. No language could be spoken by 1.9% (e.g. too young to talk). New Zealand Sign Language was known by 1.9%. The percentage of people born overseas was 16.8, compared with 28.8% nationally.

Religious affiliations were 28.0% Christian, 0.9% Hindu, 3.7% Māori religious beliefs, 0.9% New Age, and 2.8% other religions. People who answered that they had no religion were 54.2%, and 8.4% of people did not answer the census question.

Of those at least 15 years old, 21 (8.4%) people had a bachelor's or higher degree, 156 (62.7%) had a post-high school certificate or diploma, and 75 (30.1%) people exclusively held high school qualifications. 21 people (8.4%) earned over $100,000 compared to 12.1% nationally. The employment status of those at least 15 was 132 (53.0%) full-time, 39 (15.7%) part-time, and 15 (6.0%) unemployed.

=== Golden Springs statistical area ===
Golden Springs statistical area covers 498.92 km^{2} (192.63 sq mi) and had an estimated population of 1,960 as of June 2025, with a population density of 3.9 people per km^{2}.

Historical population for Golden Springs
Year	Pop.	±% p.a.
2006	1,764	—
2013	1,797	+0.27%
2018	1,767	−0.34%
2023	1,854	+0.97%

Golden Springs had a population of 1,854 in the 2023 New Zealand census, an increase of 87 people (4.9%) since the 2018 census, and an increase of 57 people (3.2%) since the 2013 census. There were 984 males, 864 females, and 6 people of other genders in 657 dwellings. 2.3% of people identified as LGBTIQ+. The median age was 33.0 years (compared with 38.1 years nationally). There were 459 people (24.8%) aged under 15 years, 402 (21.7%) aged 15 to 29, 825 (44.5%) aged 30 to 64, and 171 (9.2%) aged 65 or older.

People could identify as more than one ethnicity. The results were 76.7% European (Pākehā); 31.1% Māori; 2.8% Pasifika; 7.3% Asian; 0.5% Middle Eastern, Latin American and African New Zealanders (MELAA); and 1.6% other, which includes people giving their ethnicity as "New Zealander". English was spoken by 96.8%, Māori by 4.7%, Samoan by 0.3%, and other languages by 5.7%. No language could be spoken by 2.3% (e.g. too young to talk). New Zealand Sign Language was known by 0.6%. The percentage of people born overseas was 13.8, compared with 28.8% nationally.

Religious affiliations were 25.2% Christian, 0.5% Hindu, 0.2% Islam, 1.8% Māori religious beliefs, 0.6% Buddhist, 0.3% New Age, 0.2% Jewish, and 2.3% other religions. People who answered that they had no religion were 62.1%, and 7.3% of people did not answer the census question.

Of those at least 15 years old, 159 (11.4%) people had a bachelor's or higher degree, 873 (62.6%) had a post-high school certificate or diploma, and 360 (25.8%) people exclusively held high school qualifications. The median income was $49,600, compared with $41,500 nationally. 153 people (11.0%) earned over $100,000 compared to 12.1% nationally. The employment status of those at least 15 was 813 (58.3%) full-time, 204 (14.6%) part-time, and 27 (1.9%) unemployed.

== Marae ==
The Reporoa area has four Ngāti Tahu – Ngāti Whaoa marae:

- Mataarae Marae and meeting house is a meeting place of Ngāti Mataarae and Ngāti Whaoa.
- Ōhākī Marae and Tahumatua meeting house is a meeting place of Ngāti Tahu.
- Te Toke Marae and Te Rama meeting house is a meeting place of Ngāti Te Rama and Ngāti Whaoa.
- Waimahana or Marapounamu Marae and Rahurahu meeting house is a meeting place for Ngāti Rahurahu.

== Education ==
Reporoa College is a co-educational state secondary school for Year 7 to 13 schools, with a roll of 205 as of July 2026. It opened in 1955 as Reporoa District High School.

Reporoa also has two primary schools for Year 1 to 6 students: Reporoa School, established in 1923, with a roll of 84; and Broadlands School, established by 1937, with a roll of 122.
