= Ngāti Rongo =

Ngāti Rongo may refer to:

- A sub-tribe of Ngāi Tūhoe
- A sub-tribe of Ngāti Manuhiri
