= Ngāti Mākino =

Māori iwi (tribe) in Aotearoa (New Zealand)

- Iwi (tribe) in Māoridom

Ngāti Mākino is a Māori iwi of New Zealand.

Te Arawa FM is the radio station of Te Arawa iwi. It was established in the early 1980s and became a charitable entity in November 1990. The station underwent a major transformation in 1993, becoming Whanau FM. One of the station's frequencies was taken over by Mai FM in 1998; the other became Pumanawa FM before later reverting to Te Arawa FM. It is available on 89.0 FM in Rotorua.

== See also ==
- List of Māori iwi
