= Rotoiti, Bay of Plenty =

Settlement in Rotorua Lakes District, New Zealand

Rotoiti
- Rural settlement
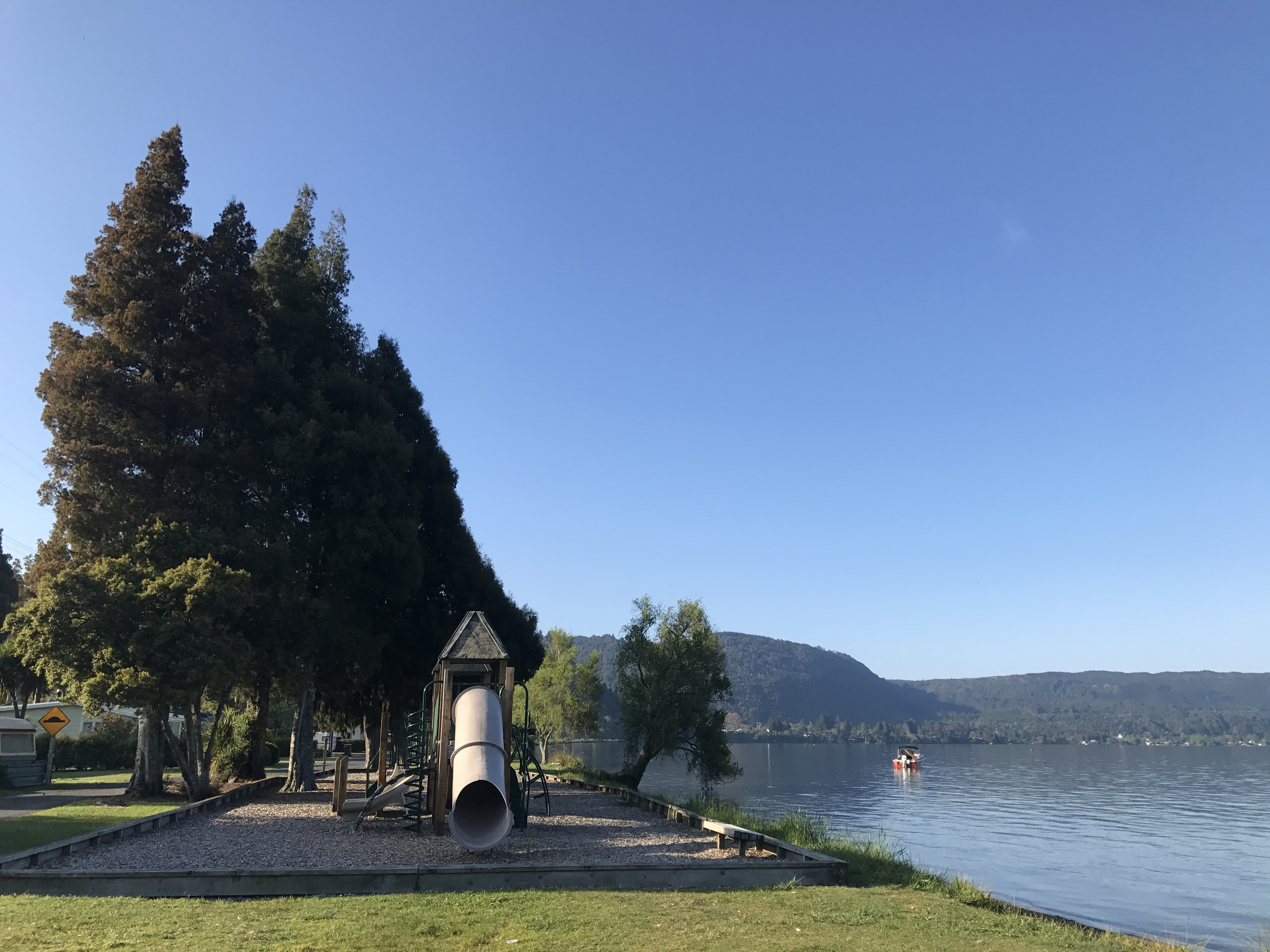
- A playground in Rotoiti on the shore of Lake Rotoiti
- Interactive map of Rotoiti
- Coordinates: 38.053814°S 176.472834°E
- Country: New Zealand
- Region: Bay of Plenty
- Territorial authority: Rotorua Lakes District
- Ward: Te Ipu Wai Auraki General Ward
- Community: Rotorua Lakes Community
- Electorates: Rotorua; Waiariki (Māori)

Government
  - Territorial authority: Rotorua Lakes Council
  - Regional council: Bay of Plenty Regional Council
  - Mayor of Rotorua: Tania Tapsell
  - Rotorua MP: Todd McClay
  - Waiariki MP: Rawiri Waititi

Area
  - Total: 5.86 km^{2} (2.26 sq mi)

Population (June 2025)
  - Total: 520
  - Density: 89/km^{2} (230/sq mi)

Rotoiti is a settlement on the shore of Lake Rotoiti, in Rotorua Lakes within the Bay of Plenty Region of New Zealand's North Island.

It is located on State Highway 30, northeast of Rotorua.

The Rotoiti Forest is located south of the settlement.

== Demographics ==
Rotoiti is described by Statistics New Zealand as a rural settlement, and covers 5.86 km^{2} (2.26 sq mi) and had an estimated population of 520 as of June 2025, with a population density of 89 people per km^{2}. Rotoiti is part of the larger Rotoiti-Rotoehu statistical area.

Historical population
Year	Pop.	±% p.a.
2006	495	—
2013	408	−2.72%
2018	498	+4.07%
2023	501	+0.12%

Rotoiti had a population of 501 in the 2023 New Zealand census, an increase of 3 people (0.6%) since the 2018 census, and an increase of 93 people (22.8%) since the 2013 census. There were 237 males and 261 females in 162 dwellings. 0.6% of people identified as LGBTIQ+. The median age was 41.5 years (compared with 38.1 years nationally). There were 102 people (20.4%) aged under 15 years, 90 (18.0%) aged 15 to 29, 219 (43.7%) aged 30 to 64, and 93 (18.6%) aged 65 or older.

People could identify as more than one ethnicity. The results were 38.3% European (Pākehā); 74.9% Māori; 5.4% Pasifika; 1.8% Asian; 0.6% Middle Eastern, Latin American and African New Zealanders (MELAA); and 1.2% other, which includes people giving their ethnicity as "New Zealander". English was spoken by 95.8%, Māori by 38.9%, and other languages by 3.0%. No language could be spoken by 1.8% (e.g. too young to talk). New Zealand Sign Language was known by 0.6%. The percentage of people born overseas was 6.6, compared with 28.8% nationally.

Religious affiliations were 28.7% Christian, 9.6% Māori religious beliefs, 0.6% New Age, and 1.2% other religions. People who answered that they had no religion were 52.1%, and 8.4% of people did not answer the census question.

Of those at least 15 years old, 87 (21.8%) people had a bachelor's or higher degree, 216 (54.1%) had a post-high school certificate or diploma, and 105 (26.3%) people exclusively held high school qualifications. The median income was $41,300, compared with $41,500 nationally. 42 people (10.5%) earned over $100,000 compared to 12.1% nationally. The employment status of those at least 15 was 198 (49.6%) full-time, 63 (15.8%) part-time, and 18 (4.5%) unemployed.

== Marae ==
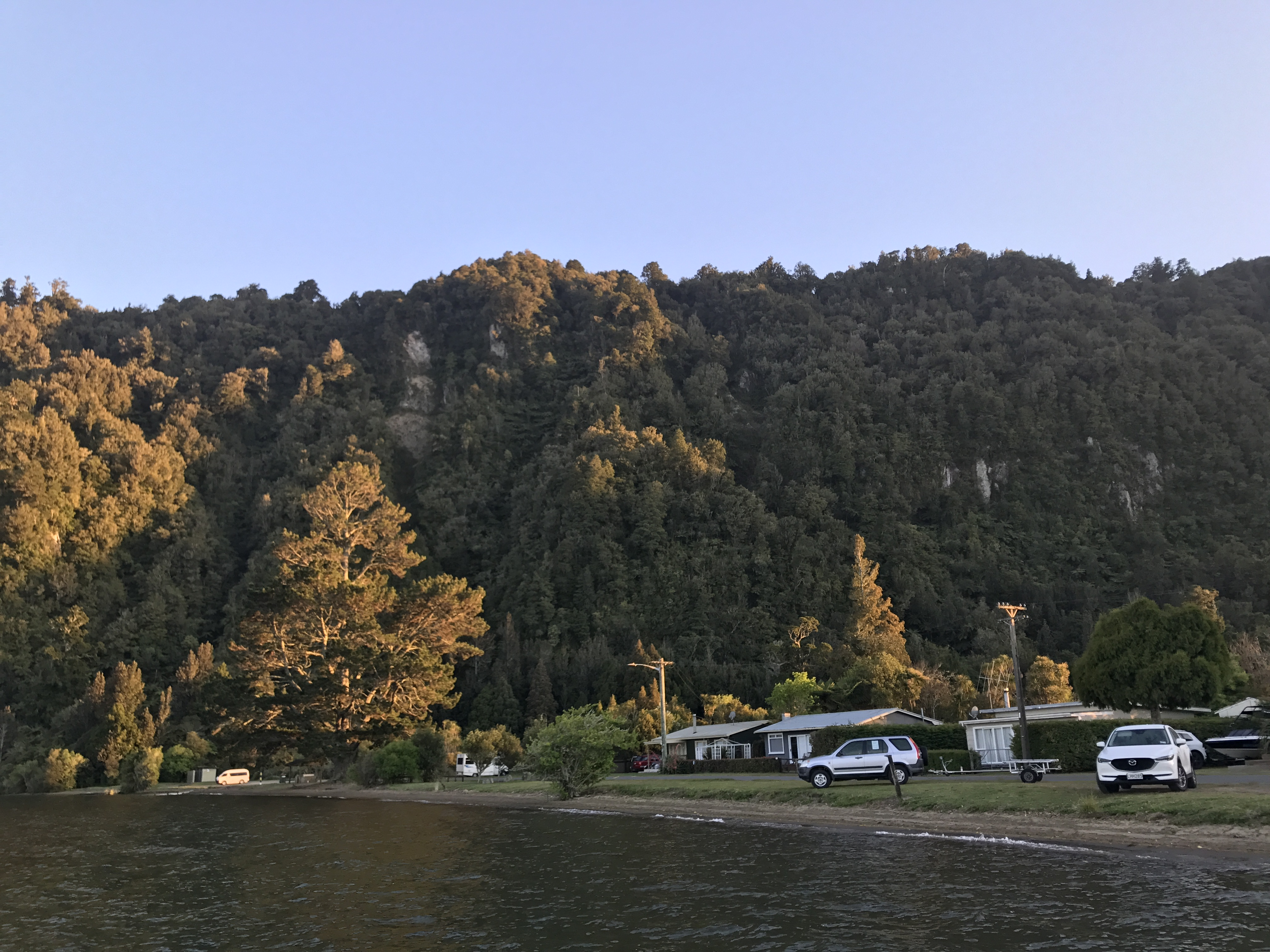
The northern end of Rotoiti township.

The Rotoiti area has seven marae:

- Punawhakareia Marae and Uenuku mai Rarotonga meeting house is a meeting place of the Ngāti Pikiao hapū of Ngāti Te Rangiunuora.
- Ruato Marae or Te Hiukura Marae and Ngā Pūmanawa e Waru meeting house is a meeting place of Ngāti Rongomai.
- Tapuaekura a Hatupatu Marae and meeting house is a meeting place of Ngāti Rongomai.
- Tapuaeharuru Marae and Uruika meeting house is a meeting place of the Ngāti Pikiao hapū of Ngāti Kawiti and Ngāti Tamateatutahi.
- Taurua Marae and Te Rangiunuora meeting house is a meeting place of the Ngāti Pikiao hapū of Ngāti Te Rangiunuora.
- Te Waiiti Marae and Hinekura meeting house is a meeting place of Ngāti Rongomai and the Ngāti Pikiao hapū of Ngāti Hinekura.
- Waikōhatu Marae and Tarāwhai meeting house is a meeting place of the Ngāti Tarāwhai hapū of Ngāti Rangitakaroro.

In October 2020, the Government committed $4,525,104 from the Provincial Growth Fund to upgrade Taurua Marae and nine others, creating an estimated 34 jobs. It committed $2,984,246 to upgrade Punawhakareia Marae, Ruato Marae, Tapuaekura a Hatupatu Marae, Tapuaeharuru Marae, Te Waiiti Marae and Te Awhe o te Rangi Marae, creating 20 jobs. Another $499,993 was committed to upgrading Waikōhatu Marae, creating 25 jobs.

== Education ==
Te Kura Kaupapa Māori o Rotoiti is a co-educational state Māori language immersion primary school, with a roll of 38 as of July 2026.

Rotoiti School, a native school, was established at Tāheke on the northwestern side of Lake Rotoiti in 1871. It was destroyed by fire in 1886, and lessons were held at a hall until a new school was built in 1890. That closed about 1892, and the building was later moved to Te Ngae. A school was moved from Tapuaeharuru to Wai-iti (both part of the current Rotoiti settlement) in 1904. Mention of Rotoiti School date from 1924 and references to Waiiti School continue to 1950, so these appear to be distinct schools.
