= Ngāti Manawa =

Māori iwi (tribe) in New Zealand

- Iwi (tribe) in Māoridom
- Population: 8,768

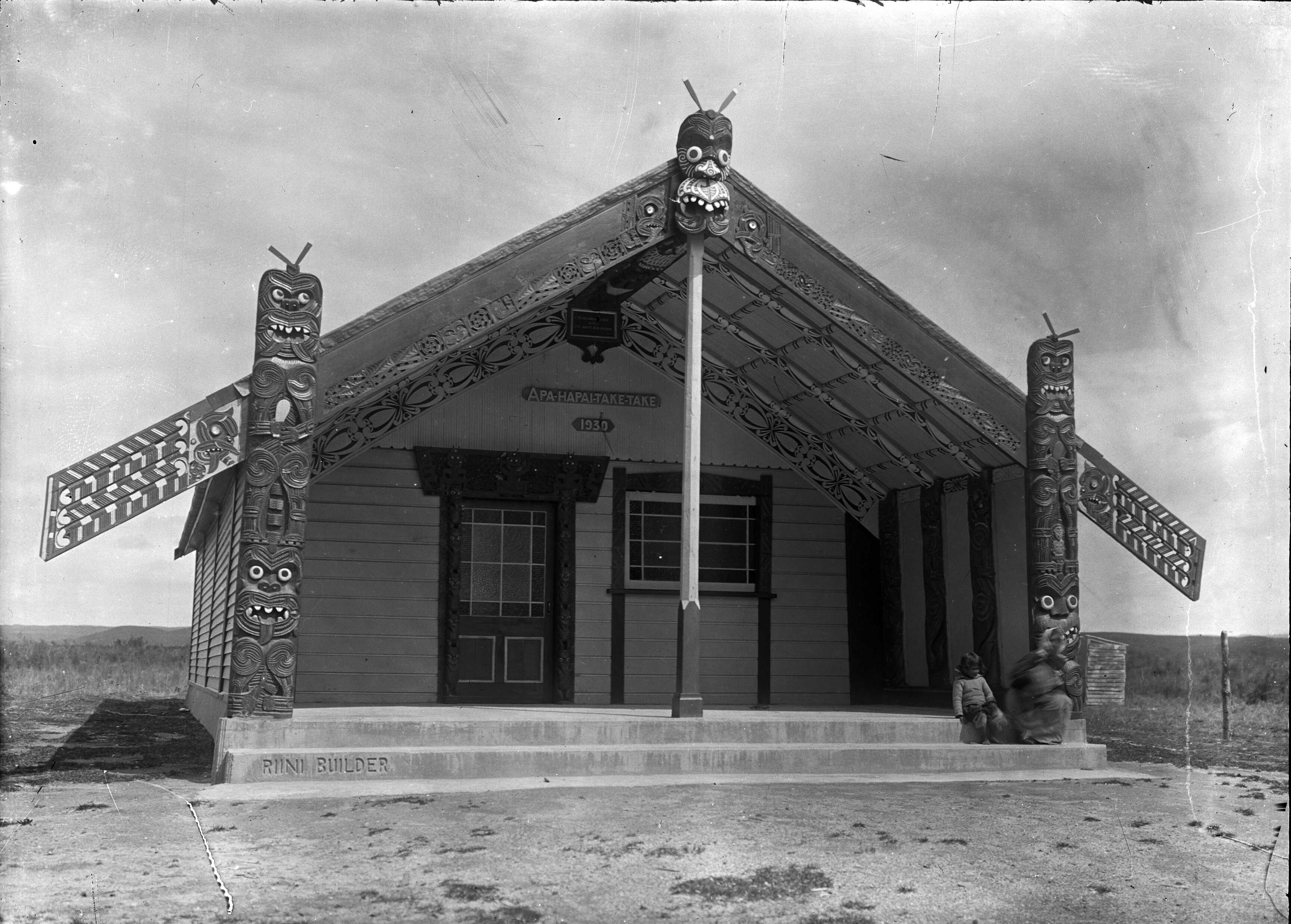
Apa Hapai Taketake meeting house at Rangitahi marae, Murupara, 1930s or 1940s

Ngāti Manawa is a Māori iwi of New Zealand.

== Hapū and marae ==
Location of Ngāti Manawa marae

The tribe is made up of four hapū (sub-tribes). Each has a marae (communal grounds) and wharenui (meeting house).

- Moewhare, based at Karangaranga marae and Moewhare wharenui just north of Murupara
- Ngāi Tokowaru, based at Tīpapa / Kakanui marae and Tangiharuru wharenui in Murupara
- Ngāti Hui, based at Rangitahi marae, and Apa Hapai Taketake wharenui in Murupara
- Ngāti Koro, based at Painoaiho marae and Ruatapu wharenui just south-east of Murupara

== Governance ==
=== Te Runanga o Ngāti Manawa ===
Te Runanga o Ngāti Manawa is a common law trust, which represents the tribe in a range of legal capacities. It is governed by three trustees from each of the four marae. It is administered by a chairperson, general manager and iwi registrar, and is based in Murupara.

The trust governs the tribe's Treaty of Waitangi settlement under the Ngāti Manawa Claims Settlement Act of 2012, and its interests in the Central North Island Forests Iwi Collective Settlement under the Central North Island Forests Land Collective Settlement Act of 2008. The trust has a mandate to represent the tribe's fisheries interests under the Māori Fisheries Act 2004. The trust also represents the tribe during consultation on resource consents, under the Resource Management Act 1991.

=== Local government ===
The tribal area of Ngāti Manawa is within the territory of Whakatāne District Council.

It is also within the boundary of Bay of Plenty Regional Council.

== Notable people ==
- Kaa Williams
- Pem Bird

== See also ==
- List of Māori iwi
