= Mourea =

Rural settlement in Bay of Plenty Region, New Zealand

- Locality
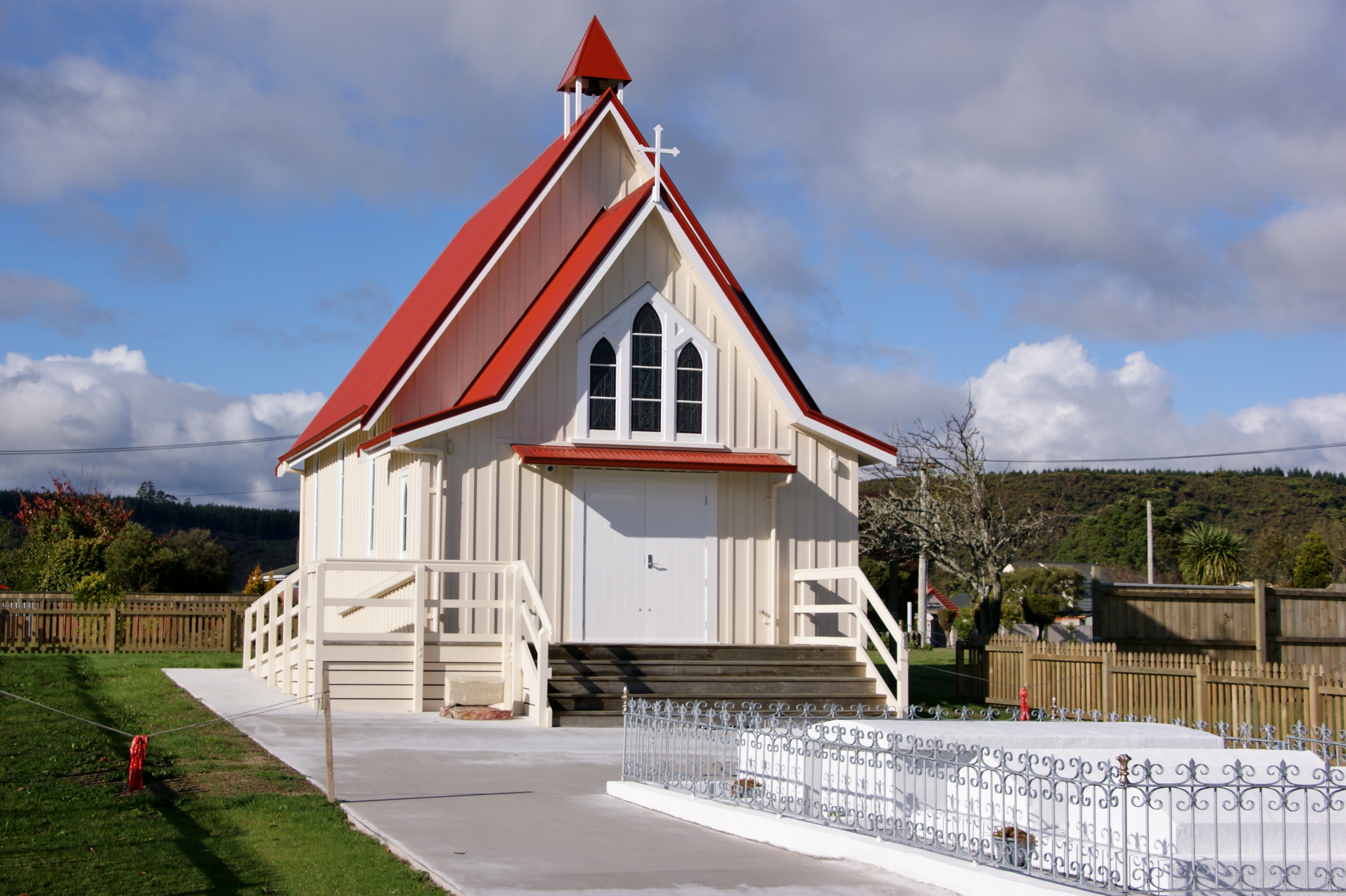
- St Mary's Church, Mourea
- Interactive map of Mourea
- Coordinates: 38.045997°S 176.330150°E
- Country: New Zealand
- Region: Bay of Plenty
- Territorial authority: Rotorua Lakes District
- Ward: Te Ipu Wai Auraki General Ward
- Community: Rotorua Lakes Community
- Electorates: Rotorua; Waiariki (Māori)

Government
  - Territorial authority: Rotorua Lakes Council
  - Regional council: Bay of Plenty Regional Council
  - Mayor of Rotorua: Tania Tapsell
  - Rotorua MP: Todd McClay
  - Waiariki MP: Rawiri Waititi

Area
  - Total: 6.53 km^{2} (2.52 sq mi)

Population (June 2025)
  - Total: 430
  - Density: 66/km^{2} (170/sq mi)

Mourea is a settlement in Rotorua Lakes within the Bay of Plenty Region of New Zealand's North Island.

It is located on a thin strip of land between Lake Rotorua and Lake Rotoiti, on State Highway 33.

== Demographics ==
Mourea is described by Statistics New Zealand as a rural settlement, and covers 6.53 km^{2} (2.52 sq mi) and had an estimated population of 430 as of June 2025, with a population density of 66 people per km^{2}. Mourea is part of the larger Rotoiti-Rotoehu statistical area.

Historical population
Year	Pop.	±% p.a.
2006	375	—
2013	336	−1.56%
2018	399	+3.50%
2023	423	+1.18%

Mourea had a population of 423 in the 2023 New Zealand census, an increase of 24 people (6.0%) since the 2018 census, and an increase of 87 people (25.9%) since the 2013 census. There were 225 males and 195 females in 156 dwellings. 3.5% of people identified as LGBTIQ+. The median age was 39.4 years (compared with 38.1 years nationally). There were 81 people (19.1%) aged under 15 years, 78 (18.4%) aged 15 to 29, 186 (44.0%) aged 30 to 64, and 78 (18.4%) aged 65 or older.

People could identify as more than one ethnicity. The results were 44.0% European (Pākehā); 61.0% Māori; 3.5% Pasifika; 9.2% Asian; and 0.7% Middle Eastern, Latin American and African New Zealanders (MELAA). English was spoken by 95.0%, Māori by 22.0%, and other languages by 6.4%. No language could be spoken by 2.1% (e.g. too young to talk). New Zealand Sign Language was known by 1.4%. The percentage of people born overseas was 17.0, compared with 28.8% nationally.

Religious affiliations were 29.8% Christian, 3.5% Hindu, 5.7% Māori religious beliefs, 0.7% Buddhist, 0.7% New Age, and 2.1% other religions. People who answered that they had no religion were 48.2%, and 8.5% of people did not answer the census question.

Of those at least 15 years old, 69 (20.2%) people had a bachelor's or higher degree, 180 (52.6%) had a post-high school certificate or diploma, and 84 (24.6%) people exclusively held high school qualifications. The median income was $40,700, compared with $41,500 nationally. 27 people (7.9%) earned over $100,000 compared to 12.1% nationally. The employment status of those at least 15 was 168 (49.1%) full-time, 45 (13.2%) part-time, and 12 (3.5%) unemployed.

== Marae ==
Mourea has three marae:

- Taupiri Marae and Paruaharanui meeting house belongs to the Ngāti Pikiao hapū of Ngāti Paruaharanui. In October 2020, the Government committed $500,000 from the Provincial Growth Fund to upgrade the marae; it was expected to create 14 jobs.
- Waiatuhi Marae and Kahumatamomoe meeting house is a meeting place for Ngāti Rongomai and the Ngāti Pikiao hapū of Ngāti Kahumatamomoe, Ngāti Paruaharanui and Ngāti Te Takinga.
- Te Takinga pa site includes two buildings: Te Takinga te whare tupuna and Hineora te wharekai.
