= Welcome Bay =

Suburb of Tauranga, New Zealand

- Suburb
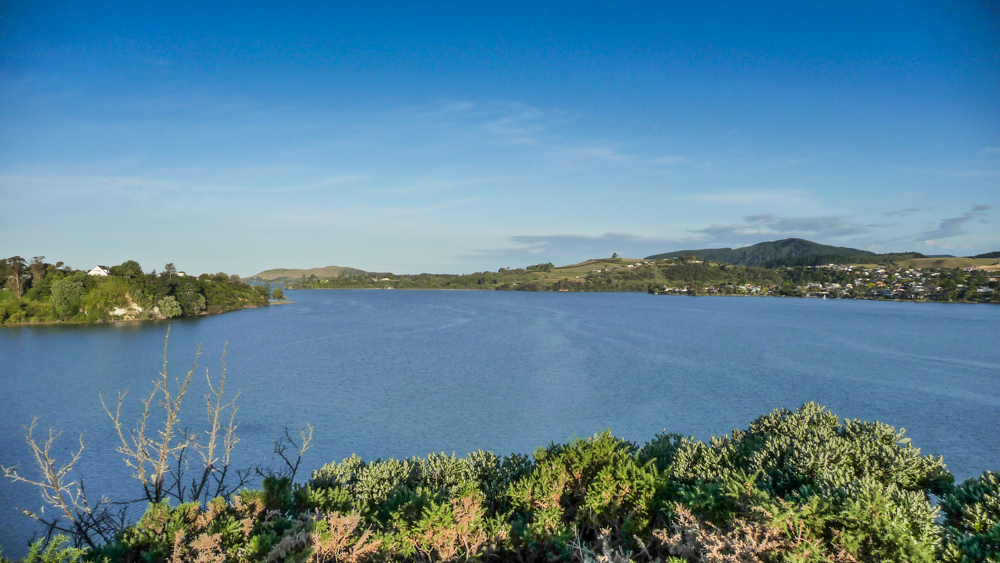
- Welcome Bay viewed from Maungatapu
- Interactive map of Welcome Bay
- Coordinates: 37°43′47″S 176°11′15″E
- Country: New Zealand
- City: Tauranga
- Local authority: Tauranga City Council
- Electoral ward: Welcome Bay General Ward

Area
  - Land: 1,165 ha (2,880 acres)

Population (June 2025)
  - Total: 11,550
  - Density: 991.4/km^{2} (2,568/sq mi)

(Waimapu Estuary)	(Tauranga Harbour)	Maungatapu
Poike	Welcome Bay	Welcome Bay
Oropi	Ohauiti

Welcome Bay is a suburb of Tauranga, New Zealand. It is located 7 kilometres (4.3 mi) from central Tauranga. Neighbouring suburbs include Hairini and Maungatapu. There are a number of schools in Welcome Bay, including three primary schools.

The name Welcome Bay has been used for the area as early as 1872 by the Bay of Plenty Times.

== Demographics ==
Welcome Bay covers 11.65 km^{2} (4.50 sq mi) and had an estimated population of 11,550 as of June 2025, with a population density of 991 people per km^{2}.

Historical population
Year	Pop.	±% p.a.
2006	7,527	—
2013	8,667	+2.04%
2018	10,284	+3.48%
2023	11,052	+1.45%

Welcome Bay had a population of 11,052 in the 2023 New Zealand census, an increase of 768 people (7.5%) since the 2018 census, and an increase of 2,385 people (27.5%) since the 2013 census. There were 5,466 males, 5,550 females, and 39 people of other genders in 3,594 dwellings. 2.4% of people identified as LGBTIQ+. The median age was 35.8 years (compared with 38.1 years nationally). There were 2,463 people (22.3%) aged under 15 years, 2,130 (19.3%) aged 15 to 29, 4,986 (45.1%) aged 30 to 64, and 1,473 (13.3%) aged 65 or older.

People could identify as more than one ethnicity. The results were 77.4% European (Pākehā); 23.8% Māori; 4.4% Pasifika; 9.6% Asian; 1.4% Middle Eastern, Latin American and African New Zealanders (MELAA); and 2.6% other, which includes people giving their ethnicity as "New Zealander". English was spoken by 96.1%, Māori by 6.0%, Samoan by 0.2%, and other languages by 12.0%. No language could be spoken by 2.2% (e.g. too young to talk). New Zealand Sign Language was known by 0.4%. The percentage of people born overseas was 23.6, compared with 28.8% nationally.

Religious affiliations were 28.3% Christian, 1.5% Hindu, 0.4% Islam, 2.5% Māori religious beliefs, 0.7% Buddhist, 0.5% New Age, 0.1% Jewish, and 3.0% other religions. People who answered that they had no religion were 56.1%, and 7.1% of people did not answer the census question.

Of those at least 15 years old, 1,893 (22.0%) people had a bachelor's or higher degree, 4,809 (56.0%) had a post-high school certificate or diploma, and 1,887 (22.0%) people exclusively held high school qualifications. The median income was $43,300, compared with $41,500 nationally. 819 people (9.5%) earned over $100,000 compared to 12.1% nationally. The employment status of those at least 15 was 4,620 (53.8%) full-time, 1,299 (15.1%) part-time, and 195 (2.3%) unemployed.

Individual statistical areas
Name	Area (km^{2})	Population	Density (per km^{2})	Dwellings	Median age	Median income
Kaitemako	3.74	1,554	416	528	38.7 years	$39,300
Welcome Bay West	1.11	2,865	2,581	948	32.5 years	$44,800
Welcome Bay East	3.69	2,658	720	879	37.6 years	$39,000
Welcome Bay South	3.11	3,978	1,279	1,242	36.5 years	$46,200
New Zealand					38.1 years	$41,500

== Marae ==
The local Tahuwhakatiki or Romai Marae and its Rongomainohorangi meeting house are a traditional meeting place for the Ngāti Ranginui hapū of Pirirākau.

In October 2020, the Government committed $500,000 from the Provincial Growth Fund to upgrade the marae, creating six jobs.

== Climate ==
Welcome Bay is a sub-tropical climate zone, with warm humid summers and mild winters. Typical summer daytime maximum air temperatures range from 22 °C to 26 °C, but seldom exceed 30 °C. Winter daytime maximum air temperatures range from 12 °C to 17 °C. Annual sunshine hours average least 2200 hours. Southwest winds prevail for much of the year. Sea breezes often occur on warm summer days. Winter usually has more rain and is the most unsettled time of year. In summer and autumn, storms of tropical origin may bring high winds and heavy rainfall from the east or northeast.

== Transport ==
Public transport in Welcome Bay solely consists of bus services. The suburb is served by one 'Bay Hopper' routes; Route 40 (City - 15th Ave - Welcome Bay).

== Education ==
Welcome Bay has two state primary schools for Year 1 to 6 students: Welcome Bay School, with a roll of 295, and Selwyn Ridge School, with a roll of 476. Welcome Bay School opened in 1979 because Maungatapu School was under pressure from its growing roll. Selwyn Ridge opened in 1997.

Tauranga Waldorf School is a state-integrated primary school for Year 1 to 8 students, with a roll of 200. The school was established in 1988.

Te Kura Kaupapa Māori o Otepou is a Māori language immersion school for Year 1 to 8 students, with a roll of 71. The school traces its origin to the native school at Ngapeke in 1889 and other native/Māori schools in the Welcome Bay/Papamoa area.

All these schools are co-educational. Rolls are as of October 2025.
