= Te Uri o Uenukukōpako =

Māori iwi (tribe) in New Zealand

- Iwi (tribe) in Māoridom
- Rohe (region): Rotorua, Te Ngae
- Waka (canoe): Arawa

Te Uri o Uenukukōpako is a Māori iwi of the Te Arawa confederation in the Bay of Plenty of New Zealand.

Chief Uenukukōpako was a great-great-great-great grandson of Tamatekapua, captain of the Arawa canoe. His kurī dog was killed by Mataaho and Kawaarero, which was part of a long war in the Rotorua district. Uenukukōpako and his relative Rangiteaorere did eventually win the war and secured the settlement of the region for their descendants. Uenukukōpako's descendants (Te Uri o Uenukukōpako / Ngāti Whakaue) occupied Mokoia Island and the north-west side of Lake Rotorua.

Te Arawa FM is the radio station of Te Arawa iwi. It was established in the early 1980s and became a charitable entity in November 1990. It is available on 89.0 FM in Rotorua.

== See also ==
- List of Māori iwi
