= Ngāti Kea Ngāti Tuarā =

Māori iwi (tribe) in Aotearoa (New Zealand)

- Iwi (tribe) in Māoridom

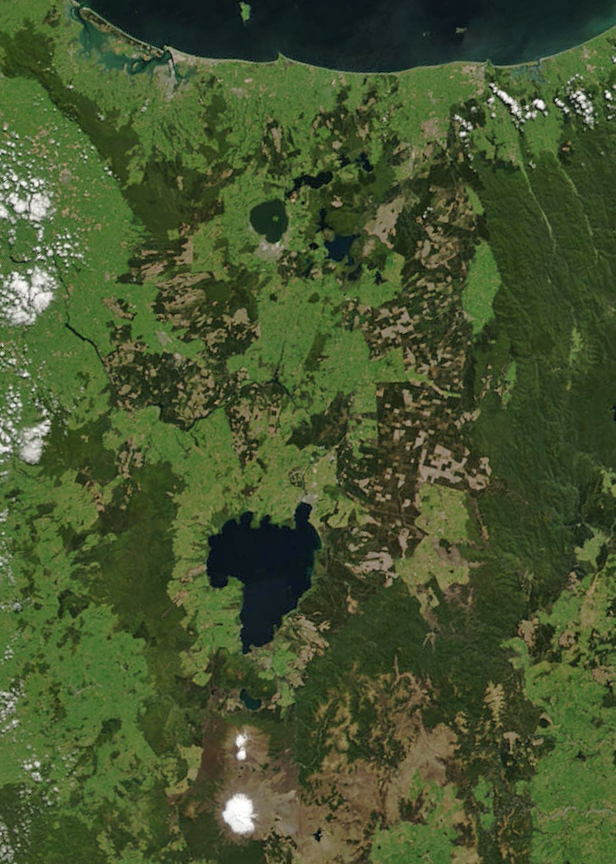
Bay of Plenty, North Island, New Zealand, from the Bay of Plenty coast to Mounts Tongariro, Ngauruhoe, and Ruapehu. Lake Taupo and the Rotorua Lakes

Ngāti Kea Ngāti Tuarā is a Māori iwi of New Zealand. They claim descent from Kearoa, the wife of Ngātoro-i-rangi, and from Tuara, a sister of Tangaroamihi and descendant of Ika, who was part of the crew of the Arawa. The tribes lived in the region of Whakamaru until the Ngāti Raukawa–Ngāti Kahu-pungapunga War, after which they were brought to the Lake Rotorua region by Te Arawa.

== See also ==
- List of Māori iwi
