= Okere Falls =

Rural settlement in Bay of Plenty Region, New Zealand

- Town
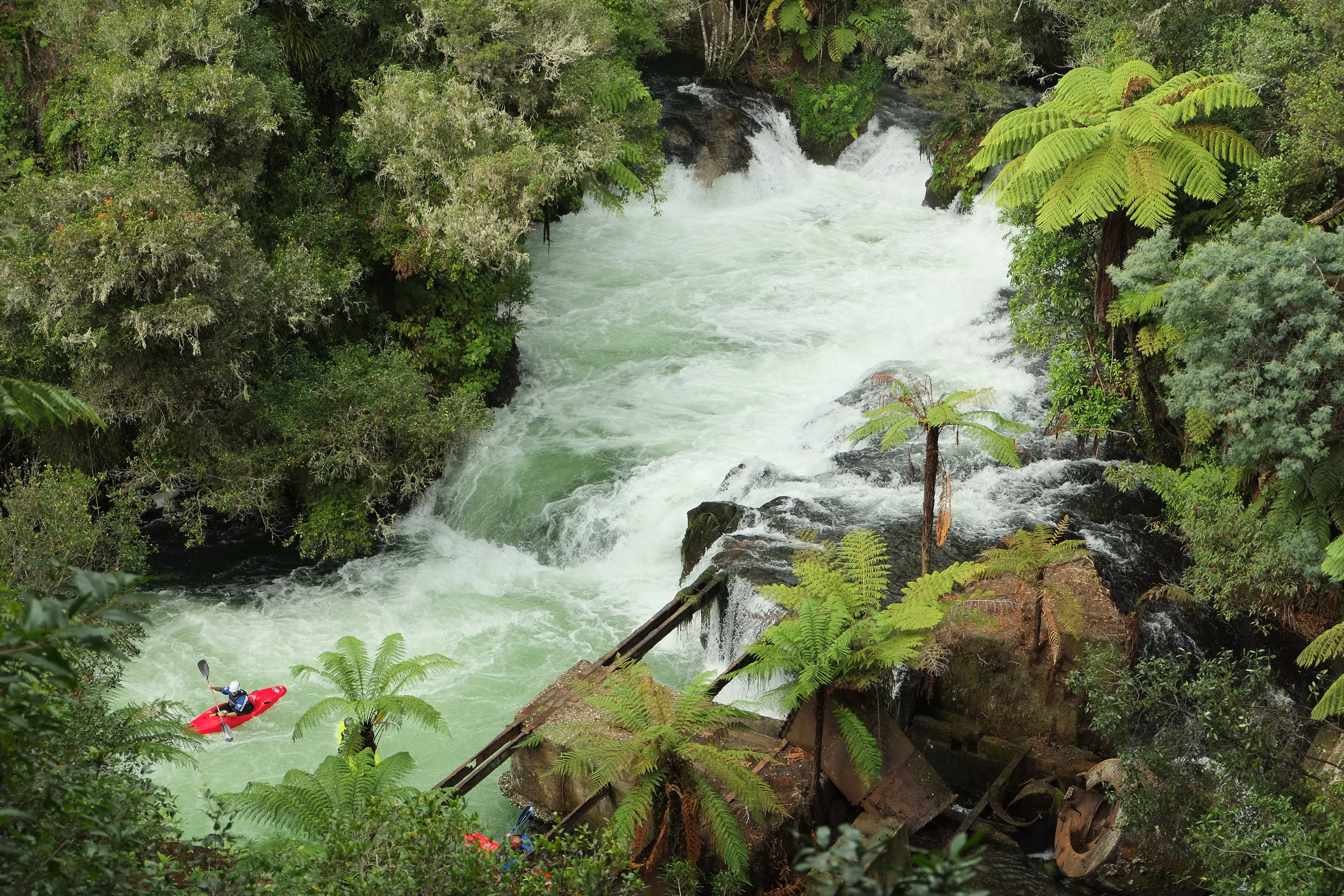
- Kayaker at Okere Falls, with the remains of the powerhouse visible in the lower right
- Interactive map of Okere Falls
- Coordinates: 38°00.86′S 176°20.73′E
- Country: New Zealand
- Region: Bay of Plenty
- Territorial authority: Rotorua Lakes District
- Ward: Te Ipu Wai Auraki General Ward
- Community: Rotorua Lakes Community
- Electorates: Rotorua; Waiariki (Māori)

Government
  - Territorial authority: Rotorua Lakes Council
  - Regional council: Bay of Plenty Regional Council
  - Mayor of Rotorua: Tania Tapsell
  - Rotorua MP: Todd McClay
  - Waiariki MP: Rawiri Waititi

Area
  - Total: 1.68 km^{2} (0.65 sq mi)

Population (June 2025)
  - Total: 370
  - Density: 220/km^{2} (570/sq mi)

Okere Falls is a small town located 21 km from Rotorua on SH 33 between Rotorua and Tauranga on the North Island of New Zealand. The town is situated on the shore of the Okere Inlet of Lake Rotoiti, from which the Kaituna River flows north towards the Bay of Plenty.

The New Zealand Ministry for Culture and Heritage gives a translation of "place of drifting" for Ōkere.

Okere Falls is a popular spot for fishing and rafting and is known for its lakeside and waterfalls. There are commercial rafting companies and holiday park accommodation within the town. A seven-metre-high waterfall lays claim to being the highest commercially rafted waterfall in the world.

The community at Okere Falls is home to a shop, and a school at Whangamarino.

== Demographics ==
Okere Falls is described by Statistics New Zealand as a rural settlement, and covers 1.68 km^{2} (0.65 sq mi) and had an estimated population of 370 as of June 2025, with a population density of 220 people per km^{2}. Okere Falls is part of the larger Rotoiti-Rotoehu statistical area.

Historical population for Okere Falls
Year	Pop.	±% p.a.
2006	345	—
2013	315	−1.29%
2018	381	+3.88%
2023	360	−1.13%

Ōkere Falls had a population of 360 in the 2023 New Zealand census, a decrease of 21 people (−5.5%) since the 2018 census, and an increase of 45 people (14.3%) since the 2013 census. There were 183 males and 180 females in 132 dwellings. 1.7% of people identified as LGBTIQ+. The median age was 40.9 years (compared with 38.1 years nationally). There were 63 people (17.5%) aged under 15 years, 60 (16.7%) aged 15 to 29, 162 (45.0%) aged 30 to 64, and 78 (21.7%) aged 65 or older.

People could identify as more than one ethnicity. The results were 71.7% European (Pākehā); 37.5% Māori; 1.7% Pasifika; 5.0% Asian; 1.7% Middle Eastern, Latin American and African New Zealanders (MELAA); and 3.3% other, which includes people giving their ethnicity as "New Zealander". English was spoken by 97.5%, Māori by 17.5%, and other languages by 7.5%. No language could be spoken by 1.7% (e.g. too young to talk). New Zealand Sign Language was known by 0.8%. The percentage of people born overseas was 18.3, compared with 28.8% nationally.

Religious affiliations were 27.5% Christian, 5.0% Māori religious beliefs, and 0.8% other religions. People who answered that they had no religion were 56.7%, and 10.0% of people did not answer the census question.

Of those at least 15 years old, 81 (27.3%) people had a bachelor's or higher degree, 162 (54.5%) had a post-high school certificate or diploma, and 57 (19.2%) people exclusively held high school qualifications. The median income was $38,800, compared with $41,500 nationally. 45 people (15.2%) earned over $100,000 compared to 12.1% nationally. The employment status of those at least 15 was 144 (48.5%) full-time, 57 (19.2%) part-time, and 9 (3.0%) unemployed.

=== Rotoiti-Rotoehu statistical area ===
Rotoiti-Rotoehu statistical area, which also includes Mourea and Rotoiti, covers 404.02 km^{2} (155.99 sq mi) and had an estimated population of 2,160 as of June 2025, with a population density of 5.3 people per km^{2}.

Historical population for Rotoiti-Rotoehu
Year	Pop.	±% p.a.
2006	1,935	—
2013	1,659	−2.17%
2018	1,965	+3.44%
2023	2,085	+1.19%

Rotoiti-Rotoehu had a population of 2,085 in the 2023 New Zealand census, an increase of 120 people (6.1%) since the 2018 census, and an increase of 426 people (25.7%) since the 2013 census. There were 1,050 males, 1,029 females, and 3 people of other genders in 759 dwellings. 2.0% of people identified as LGBTIQ+. The median age was 42.9 years (compared with 38.1 years nationally). There were 399 people (19.1%) aged under 15 years, 333 (16.0%) aged 15 to 29, 948 (45.5%) aged 30 to 64, and 405 (19.4%) aged 65 or older.

People could identify as more than one ethnicity. The results were 56.7% European (Pākehā); 55.0% Māori; 4.3% Pasifika; 3.9% Asian; 0.7% Middle Eastern, Latin American and African New Zealanders (MELAA); and 1.2% other, which includes people giving their ethnicity as "New Zealander". English was spoken by 96.3%, Māori by 24.3%, Samoan by 0.1%, and other languages by 5.0%. No language could be spoken by 1.4% (e.g. too young to talk). New Zealand Sign Language was known by 1.0%. The percentage of people born overseas was 12.9, compared with 28.8% nationally.

Religious affiliations were 30.9% Christian, 0.7% Hindu, 0.1% Islam, 6.2% Māori religious beliefs, 0.4% Buddhist, 0.4% New Age, and 2.0% other religions. People who answered that they had no religion were 51.9%, and 7.5% of people did not answer the census question.

Of those at least 15 years old, 345 (20.5%) people had a bachelor's or higher degree, 924 (54.8%) had a post-high school certificate or diploma, and 411 (24.4%) people exclusively held high school qualifications. The median income was $38,000, compared with $41,500 nationally. 159 people (9.4%) earned over $100,000 compared to 12.1% nationally. The employment status of those at least 15 was 813 (48.2%) full-time, 240 (14.2%) part-time, and 72 (4.3%) unemployed.

== History and culture ==
The area is the traditional homeland of the Ngāti Pikiao, who remain the guardians of the river through the Lake Rotoiti Scenic Reserves Board. Their traditional name for the Kaituna River was Okere River. The river's alternative name, 'Kaituna', refers to its significance as a food source, in particular eels.

Before the first road bridge over the river was built in 1872, local Māori operated a ferry across the inlet. Travellers from Tauranga to Rotorua would typically break their journey with a night at the nearby Fraser's Hotel.

The first 11 km stretch of the Kaituna River is still commonly referred to as Okere River, and is a site of significant Māori cultural and spiritual values. Okere River means "the place of drifting".

=== Marae ===
The Okere Falls area has three Ngāti Pikiao marae:

- Pounamunui Marae and its Houmaitawhiti meeting house are affiliated with Ngāti Hinekura.
- Tāheke Opatia Marae and Rangitihi meeting house are affiliated with Ngāti Hinerangi.
- Te Takinga Marae and Te Takinga meeting house are affiliated with Ngāti Te Takinga.

In October 2020, the Government committed $4,525,104 from the Provincial Growth Fund to upgrade Pounamunui, Tāheke Opatia and eight other marae, creating an estimated 34 jobs; while also committed $441,758 to upgrade Te Takinga, creating an estimated 51 jobs.

== Education ==
Whangamarino School is a co-educational state primary school for Year 1 to 8 students, with a roll of 134 as of July 2026. The school offers classes in either English or Māori. The school opened in 1926.

== Economy ==
Raft plunging over the seven metre Tutea Falls

The Okere Falls area has drawn visitors for well over 100 years, with the area being a popular day trip destination from Rotorua. By the late 19th century, trout fishing had become very popular, and for a while the hydro-electric power station was a tourist attraction in its own right.

Along Trout Pool Road, one can find a bushwalk with scenic lookouts over Okere River, Okere Falls, and Tutea Falls. Remains of the hydro-electric power station can also be found. There are car parks and toilets at both ends of the 30 minute walk, starting at Okere Falls, passing Tutea Falls at about halfway, and finishing at Trout Pool Falls.

At Tutea Falls, named after a local Māori chief, a lookout provides a good vantage point to see kayakers and rafts plunge over the seven-metre-tall waterfall. From the viewing platform, steps lead down to the river and Tutea's Caves. These steps were cut into the cliff face in 1907 as an attraction for early tourists, who would have their photo taken at the bottom of the steps. The trout pool at the northern end of the track is a popular trout fishing spot.

The Okere Falls stretch of the Kaituna River is popular with whitewater rafters and kayakers, and is classified as grade 3/4, with Tutea Falls being a solid grade 4.

Okere is also home to the Okere Falls Power Station.

== In popular culture ==
In the fifth season of the CBS television series The Amazing Race, Okere Falls were the site of one of two Detour options, 'Clean or Dirty', with teams that chose 'Clean' got the chance to go whitewater river sledging at the falls.

For the second series of Jack Osbourne: Adrenaline Junkie, Jack Osbourne tries whitewater kayaking at the falls as a part of the show's challenge before making his way to Japan.
