= Ngāti Tahu – Ngāti Whaoa =

Māori iwi (tribe) in Aotearoa New Zealand

- Iwi (tribe) in Māoridom

Ngāti Tahu – Ngāti Whaoa is a Māori iwi of New Zealand whose traditional territory lies between the Rotorua lakes and Lake Taupō, and is centred on Orakei Korako, on the Waikato River.

They are descended from Tahu Matua and take their name from him and his descendant Whaoa. Tahu Matua arrived in New Zealand before the main Māori migration canoes from Hawaiki. Whaoa was an ancestor some generations younger, who descended from Tahu Matua through his mother, Hinewai, and descended from Atuamatua through his father, Paengatu. Through successive generations of inter-marriage with neighbouring iwi, members of the tribe also have ancestors who arrived on the Arawa, Mataatua and Tainui waka.

== See also ==
- List of Māori iwi
