= Eastern Bay of Plenty =

Eastern Bay of Plenty is a former New Zealand parliamentary electorate, which existed for one parliamentary term from 1993 to 1996, and was held by National's Tony Ryall.

== Population centres ==
Based on the 1991 New Zealand census, an electoral redistribution was carried out. This resulted in the abolition of nine electorates, and the creation of eleven new electorates. Through an amendment in the Electoral Act in 1965, the number of electorates in the South Island was fixed at 25, so the new electorates increased the number of the North Island electorates by two. In the South Island, one electorate was abolished and one electorate was recreated. In the North Island, five electorates were newly created (including Eastern Bay of Plenty), five electorates were recreated, and eight electorates were abolished.

The electorate included all the Ōpōtiki and Kawerau Districts, most of the Whakatane District, and a small part of the Gisborne District. The main towns were Whakatāne and Ōpōtiki, and in addition, polling booths were at Awakeri, Cape Runaway, Galatea, Kawerau, Kutarere, Matawai, Minginui, Motu, Murupara, Nukuhou, Ōhope, Omaio, Omarumutu, Otoko, Paroa, Raukokore, Ruatoki, Tāneatua, Te Kaha, Te Teko, Thornton, Tōrere, Waimana, Waioeka, Waiohau, and Woodlands.

== History ==
Tony Ryall of the National Party was the electorate's representative during its existence from 1993 to 1996. Ryall had previously represented the East Cape electorate since the 1990 election. After the Eastern Bay of Plenty electorate was abolished in 1996, Ryall transferred to the new Bay of Plenty, which he represented until his retirement from politics in 2014.

=== Members of Parliament ===
Key

National

Election	Winner
1993 election	Tony Ryall
(Electorate abolished 1996, see Bay of Plenty)

== Election results ==
=== 1993 election ===
1993 general election: Eastern Bay of Plenty
Party	Candidate	Votes	%	±%
National	Tony Ryall	6,547	37.58	
Labour	Diane Collins	5,741	32.95	
Alliance	Jim Bennett	2,633	15.11	
NZ First	Sue Blackman	2,062	11.83	
Christian Heritage	S Morrison	343	1.97	
Defence Movement	T Chadwick	50	0.29	
Natural Law	B Aubertin	47	0.27	
Majority		806	4.63	
Informal votes		391	2.19	
Turnout		17,814	83.58	
Registered electors		21,314		
