= Omarumutu =

Locality in the Bay of Plenty, New Zealand

- Locality
- Interactive map of Omarumutu
- Coordinates: 37.987°S 177.399°E
- Country: New Zealand
- Region: Bay of Plenty
- Territorial authority: Ōpōtiki District
- Ward: Waioeka-Waiōtahe-Otara Ward
- Electorates: East Cape; Waiariki (Māori)

Government
  - Territorial authority: Ōpōtiki District Council
  - Regional council: Bay of Plenty Regional Council
  - Mayor of Ōpōtiki: David Moore
  - East Cape MP: Dana Kirkpatrick
  - Waiariki MP: Rawiri Waititi

Area
  - Total: 14.21 km^{2} (5.49 sq mi)

Population (2023 Census)
  - Total: 174
  - Density: 12.2/km^{2} (31.7/sq mi)
- Postcode(s): 3197

Omarumutu is a community in the Ōpōtiki District and Bay of Plenty Region of New Zealand's North Island, located near the mouth of the Waiaua River. The area includes large tracts of Māori freehold land. Neighbouring localities are Opape, on the coast 2 km (1.2 mi) to the east, and Waiaua, 2 km (1.2 mi) inland.

== Demographics ==
Omarumutu locality, which also includes Waiaua, covers 14.21 km^{2} (5.49 sq mi). It is part of the Ōtara-Tirohanga statistical area.

Historical population for Omarumutu locality
Year	Pop.	±% p.a.
2006	177	—
2013	183	+0.48%
2018	153	−3.52%
2023	174	+2.61%

Omarumutu had a population of 174 in the 2023 New Zealand census, an increase of 21 people (13.7%) since the 2018 census, and a decrease of 9 people (−4.9%) since the 2013 census. There were 93 males and 81 females in 66 dwellings. 1.7% of people identified as LGBTIQ+. The median age was 46.3 years (compared with 38.1 years nationally). There were 21 people (12.1%) aged under 15 years, 33 (19.0%) aged 15 to 29, 81 (46.6%) aged 30 to 64, and 42 (24.1%) aged 65 or older.

People could identify as more than one ethnicity. The results were 63.8% European (Pākehā), 56.9% Māori, and 1.7% Asian. English was spoken by 96.6%, Māori by 12.1%, and other languages by 5.2%. No language could be spoken by 1.7% (e.g. too young to talk). The percentage of people born overseas was 8.6, compared with 28.8% nationally.

Religious affiliations were 36.2% Christian, and 3.4% Māori religious beliefs. People who answered that they had no religion were 51.7%, and 8.6% of people did not answer the census question.

Of those at least 15 years old, 15 (9.8%) people had a bachelor's or higher degree, 84 (54.9%) had a post-high school certificate or diploma, and 51 (33.3%) people exclusively held high school qualifications. The median income was $32,000, compared with $41,500 nationally. 12 people (7.8%) earned over $100,000 compared to 12.1% nationally. The employment status of those at least 15 was 69 (45.1%) full-time, 18 (11.8%) part-time, and 9 (5.9%) unemployed.

=== Ōtara-Tirohanga statistical area ===
Ōtara-Tirohanga statistical area covers 113.40 km^{2} (43.78 sq mi) and had an estimated population of 1,430 as of June 2025, with a population density of 13 people per km^{2}.

Historical population for Ōtara-Tirohanga
Year	Pop.	±% p.a.
2006	1,188	—
2013	1,167	−0.25%
2018	1,176	+0.15%
2023	1,407	+3.65%

Ōtara-Tirohanga had a population of 1,407 in the 2023 New Zealand census, an increase of 231 people (19.6%) since the 2018 census, and an increase of 240 people (20.6%) since the 2013 census. There were 702 males, 702 females, and 3 people of other genders in 486 dwellings. 1.9% of people identified as LGBTIQ+. The median age was 42.2 years (compared with 38.1 years nationally). There were 291 people (20.7%) aged under 15 years, 225 (16.0%) aged 15 to 29, 567 (40.3%) aged 30 to 64, and 327 (23.2%) aged 65 or older.

People could identify as more than one ethnicity. The results were 62.9% European (Pākehā); 57.1% Māori; 2.8% Pasifika; 1.5% Asian; 0.9% Middle Eastern, Latin American and African New Zealanders (MELAA); and 2.8% other, which includes people giving their ethnicity as "New Zealander". English was spoken by 96.2%, Māori by 15.1%, Samoan by 0.4%, and other languages by 4.1%. No language could be spoken by 2.8% (e.g. too young to talk). New Zealand Sign Language was known by 0.4%. The percentage of people born overseas was 10.4, compared with 28.8% nationally.

Religious affiliations were 28.6% Christian, 0.2% Hindu, 0.2% Islam, 8.7% Māori religious beliefs, 0.4% New Age, and 1.1% other religions. People who answered that they had no religion were 52.5%, and 8.5% of people did not answer the census question.

Of those at least 15 years old, 153 (13.7%) people had a bachelor's or higher degree, 603 (54.0%) had a post-high school certificate or diploma, and 363 (32.5%) people exclusively held high school qualifications. The median income was $32,800, compared with $41,500 nationally. 78 people (7.0%) earned over $100,000 compared to 12.1% nationally. The employment status of those at least 15 was 483 (43.3%) full-time, 165 (14.8%) part-time, and 48 (4.3%) unemployed.

== Marae ==
Ōmarumutu Marae features the Tūtāmure meeting house, named after the ancestral chief of Ngāti Ruatākena, who overcame Ngāti Kahungunu on the Māhia Peninsula. Tūtāmure's original fortifications are still visible; the nearby Makeo peak was one of his strongholds. The house was opened in 1901.

Omarumutu War Memorial Hall, located on the marae, was opened by Minister of Māori Affairs Ralph Hanan on 18 March 1961. Bishop Wiremu Panapa and Reverend Rangi Ehu unveiled a memorial tablet inside, presented to Ngāti Ruatākena and Whakatōhea by members of the Māori Battalion, to commemorate both Māori and Pākehā who died during the Boer War, World War I and World War II. Pine Taiapa oversaw the creation of the carvings, tukutuku and kōwhaiwhai that decorate the hall. The artwork is promoted as some of the best Māori artwork in the country and is a tourist drawcard, open the public when tangihanga or other functions are not being held.

A memorial cenotaph on the marae, a white column on a concrete base and funeral urn, was initially unveiled with the names of eight local men who died during wars. The names of a further eight who died during World War II and the Vietnam War were added in 1978. A granite memorial stone, also on a concrete base, lists the name of a further four men who died during World War II.

In October 2020, the Government committed $61,944 from the Provincial Growth Fund to renovate the war memorial, toilets and cooking shed, creating an estimated 8 jobs.

== Education ==
Te Kura o Ōmarumutu is a co-educational state primary school for Year 1 to 8 students, with a roll of 70 as of July 2026. It opened in 1861 as Ōmarumutu Native School. It became a Designated Character School in 2022.
