= Oponae =

Locality in the Bay of Plenty, New Zealand

- Locality
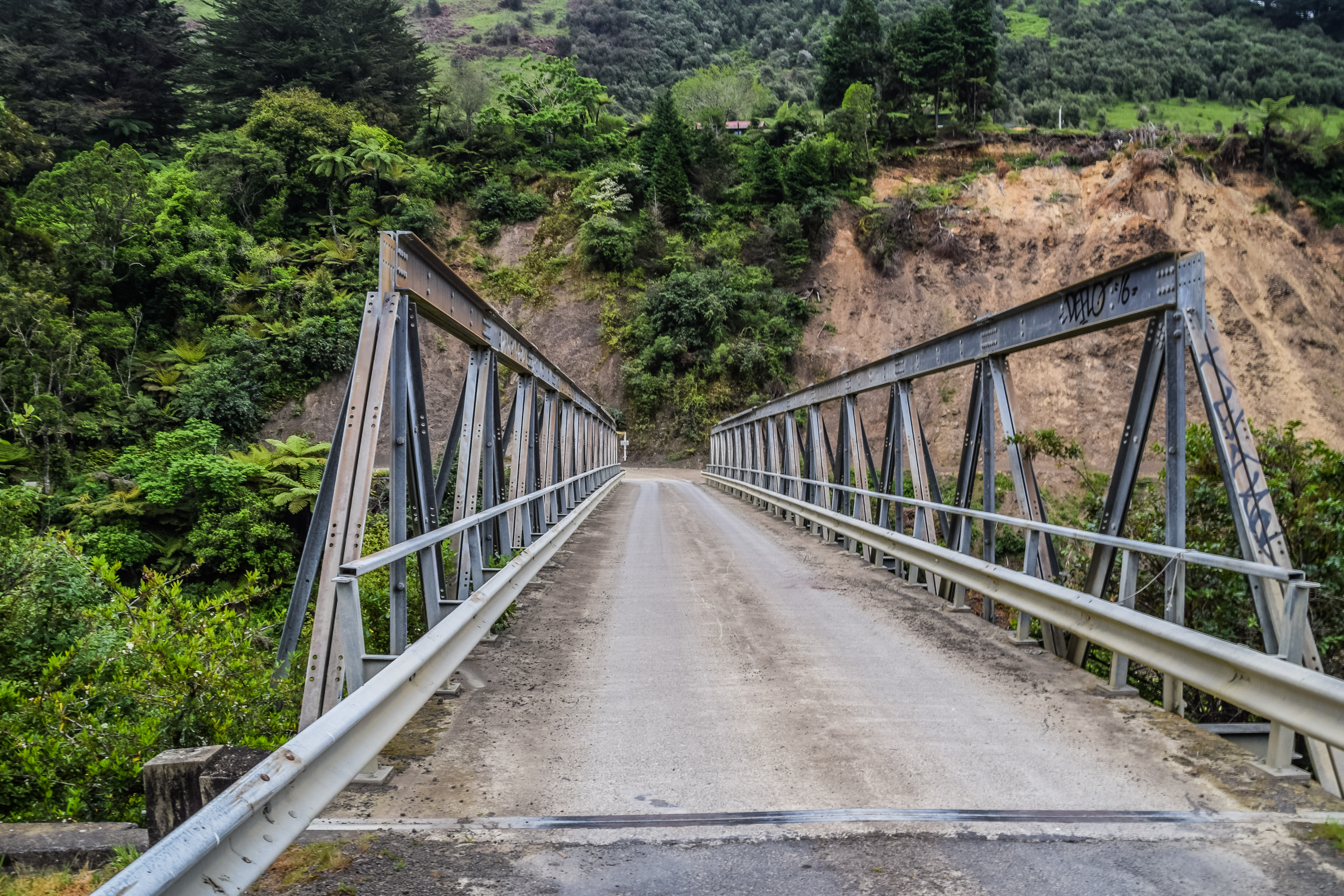
- Oponae Bridge over the Waioweka River
- Interactive map of Oponae
- Coordinates: 38.257°S 177.298°E
- Country: New Zealand
- Region: Bay of Plenty
- Territorial authority: Ōpōtiki District
- Ward: Waioeka-Waiōtahe-Otara Ward
- Electorates: East Cape; Waiariki (Māori)

Government
  - Territorial authority: Ōpōtiki District Council
  - Regional council: Bay of Plenty Regional Council
  - Mayor of Ōpōtiki: David Moore
  - East Cape MP: Dana Kirkpatrick
  - Waiariki MP: Rawiri Waititi

Area
  - Total: 649.50 km^{2} (250.77 sq mi)

Population (2023 Census)
  - Total: 198
  - Density: 0.305/km^{2} (0.790/sq mi)
- Postcode(s): 3197

Oponae is a rural locality on the Waioweka River in the Ōpōtiki District and Bay of Plenty Region of New Zealand's North Island. State Highway 2 runs through the area. The Waioeka Gorge Scenic Reserve surrounds the locality.

Three bridges cross the Waioweka River near Oponae: the Tauranga Bridge, a historic 'harp' suspension bridge built about 1922; the Oponae Bridge; and the Wairata Bridge.

== Demographics ==
Oponae and its surrounds cover 649.50 km^{2} (250.77 sq mi). It is part of the Oponae statistical area.

Historical population for the locality and its surrounds
Year	Pop.	±% p.a.
2006	135	—
2013	141	+0.62%
2018	189	+6.03%
2023	198	+0.93%

Oponae locality had a population of 198 in the 2023 New Zealand census, an increase of 9 people (4.8%) since the 2018 census, and an increase of 57 people (40.4%) since the 2013 census. There were 93 males and 105 females in 75 dwellings. The median age was 30.2 years (compared with 38.1 years nationally). There were 60 people (30.3%) aged under 15 years, 39 (19.7%) aged 15 to 29, 66 (33.3%) aged 30 to 64, and 33 (16.7%) aged 65 or older.

People could identify as more than one ethnicity. The results were 42.4% European (Pākehā), 75.8% Māori, 6.1% Pasifika, 1.5% Asian, and 3.0% other, which includes people giving their ethnicity as "New Zealander". English was spoken by 95.5%, Māori by 33.3%, and other languages by 1.5%. No language could be spoken by 3.0% (e.g. too young to talk). The percentage of people born overseas was 6.1, compared with 28.8% nationally.

Religious affiliations were 25.8% Christian, 31.8% Māori religious beliefs, and 1.5% New Age. People who answered that they had no religion were 36.4%, and 6.1% of people did not answer the census question.

Of those at least 15 years old, 15 (10.9%) people had a bachelor's or higher degree, 78 (56.5%) had a post-high school certificate or diploma, and 42 (30.4%) people exclusively held high school qualifications. The median income was $28,100, compared with $41,500 nationally. 3 people (2.2%) earned over $100,000 compared to 12.1% nationally. The employment status of those at least 15 was 57 (41.3%) full-time, 21 (15.2%) part-time, and 15 (10.9%) unemployed.

=== Oponae statistical area ===
Oponae statistical area covers 1,255.59 km^{2} (484.79 sq mi) and had an estimated population of 360 as of June 2025, with a population density of 0.29 people per km^{2}.

Historical population for the statistical area
Year	Pop.	±% p.a.
2006	300	—
2013	294	−0.29%
2018	330	+2.34%
2023	360	+1.76%

The statistical area had a population of 360 in the 2023 New Zealand census, an increase of 30 people (9.1%) since the 2018 census, and an increase of 66 people (22.4%) since the 2013 census. There were 183 males, 177 females, and 3 people of other genders in 144 dwellings. 3.3% of people identified as LGBTIQ+. The median age was 34.8 years (compared with 38.1 years nationally). There were 87 people (24.2%) aged under 15 years, 75 (20.8%) aged 15 to 29, 144 (40.0%) aged 30 to 64, and 54 (15.0%) aged 65 or older.

People could identify as more than one ethnicity. The results were 48.3% European (Pākehā), 69.2% Māori, 4.2% Pasifika, 0.8% Asian, and 1.7% other, which includes people giving their ethnicity as "New Zealander". English was spoken by 97.5%, Māori by 28.3%, Samoan by 0.8%, and other languages by 2.5%. No language could be spoken by 1.7% (e.g. too young to talk). The percentage of people born overseas was 8.3, compared with 28.8% nationally.

Religious affiliations were 23.3% Christian, 26.7% Māori religious beliefs, 1.7% New Age, and 0.8% other religions. People who answered that they had no religion were 43.3%, and 5.8% of people did not answer the census question.

Of those at least 15 years old, 33 (12.1%) people had a bachelor's or higher degree, 150 (54.9%) had a post-high school certificate or diploma, and 93 (34.1%) people exclusively held high school qualifications. The median income was $27,000, compared with $41,500 nationally. 6 people (2.2%) earned over $100,000 compared to 12.1% nationally. The employment status of those at least 15 was 108 (39.6%) full-time, 45 (16.5%) part-time, and 27 (9.9%) unemployed.

== Education ==
Both Oponae and Wairata had schools during the 20th century. Wairata School closed in 2001 after a full term with no students.
