= Tōrere =

- Locality
- Interactive map of Tōrere
- Coordinates: 37.950°S 177.490°E
- Country: New Zealand
- Region: Bay of Plenty
- Territorial authority: Ōpōtiki District
- Ward: Coast
- Community: Coast Community
- Electorates: East Cape; Waiariki

Government
  - Territorial authority: Ōpōtiki District Council
  - Regional council: Bay of Plenty Regional Council
  - Mayor of Ōpōtiki: David Moore
  - East Cape MP: Dana Kirkpatrick
  - Waiariki MP: Rawiri Waititi

Area
  - Total: 28.50 km^{2} (11.00 sq mi)

Population (2023 Census)
  - Total: 129
  - Density: 4.53/km^{2} (11.7/sq mi)
- Time zone: UTC+12 (NZST)
  - Summer (DST): UTC+13 (NZDT)
- Postcode: 3197
- Area code: 07

Tōrere, also written Torere, is a small coastal settlement in the Ōpōtiki District of the Bay of Plenty Region on New Zealand's North Island. It is about 20 km (12 mi) by road north-east of the town of Ōpōtiki. Neighbouring localities include Opape to the south-west and Hāwai to the north-east. Tōrere is the ancestral home of the Ngāitai people.

== History ==
Tōrere was one of the earliest places visited by the Tainui migratory waka. Traditional histories tell of Tōrere-nui-ā-rua, eldest child and daughter of Hoturoa she is referred to as the aho ariki. Tōrere disembarked from the Tainui waka to escape from the advances of the tohunga known as Taikehu. During her escape, Tōrere met a local rangatira, Manaakiao and the two married. Their descendants became known as Ngāitai, and the area was named after Tōrere-nui-ā-rua.

The bodies of two girls washed ashore at Torere in 1900. They were among 16 children and two adults who had drowned while crossing the Mōtū River days earlier.

The body of a 54-year-old woman washed ashore at Torere in 2017.

A hui, held in Torere in August 2018, found locals were opposed to a national Māori Battalion Museum being established at Waitangi to commemorate local men who served or died during World War II.

== Demographics ==
Tōrere and its surrounds cover 28.50 km^{2} (11.00 sq mi). Tōrere is part of the larger Cape Runaway statistical area.

Historical population
Year	Pop.	±% p.a.
2006	141	—
2013	111	−3.36%
2018	126	+2.57%
2023	129	+0.47%

Tōrere and its surrounds had a population of 129 in the 2023 New Zealand census, an increase of 3 people (2.4%) since the 2018 census, and an increase of 18 people (16.2%) since the 2013 census. There were 60 males and 69 females in 48 dwellings. 4.7% of people identified as LGBTIQ+. The median age was 45.6 years (compared with 38.1 years nationally). There were 24 people (18.6%) aged under 15 years, 30 (23.3%) aged 15 to 29, 45 (34.9%) aged 30 to 64, and 27 (20.9%) aged 65 or older.

People could identify as more than one ethnicity. The results were 25.6% European (Pākehā), 83.7% Māori, and 7.0% Pasifika. English was spoken by 95.3%, and Māori by 34.9%. No language could be spoken by 4.7% (e.g. too young to talk). New Zealand Sign Language was known by 2.3%. The percentage of people born overseas was 7.0, compared with 28.8% nationally.

Religious affiliations were 37.2% Christian, and 20.9% Māori religious beliefs. People who answered that they had no religion were 34.9%, and 7.0% of people did not answer the census question.

Of those at least 15 years old, 15 (14.3%) people had a bachelor's or higher degree, 51 (48.6%) had a post-high school certificate or diploma, and 39 (37.1%) people exclusively held high school qualifications. The median income was $24,500, compared with $41,500 nationally. The employment status of those at least 15 was 36 (34.3%) full-time, 9 (8.6%) part-time, and 9 (8.6%) unemployed.

== Marae ==
Tōrere has a marae. It includes the Holy Trinity Memorial Church, a 1950s church decorated with carved pillars, tukutuku panels and stained-glass windows. Its World War II Roll of Honour includes the names of almost 40 local men who served in the Māori Battalion, including eight killed in action.

== Education ==
Te Kura o Tōrere is a co-educational Māori immersion primary school, with a roll of 32 as of July 2026. It was established on 27 February 1878 as a Māori school with fifteen pupils. It functioned as a post office, telephone exchange and birth, death and marriage registry during the early 19th century. It became a general school in 1969, then a Māori immersion school in 2001. It features a carved gateway.

== Economy ==
One of the area's largest businesses is Torere Macadamias, an organic macadamia farm established on land not suited to other forms of agriculture. The farm featured on Country Calendar in 2017. Macadamia research from the farm has been presented at the University of Hawaii. The farm is a major global producer of macadamias and related products.
