= Te Kaha =

Town in Bay of Plenty, New Zealand

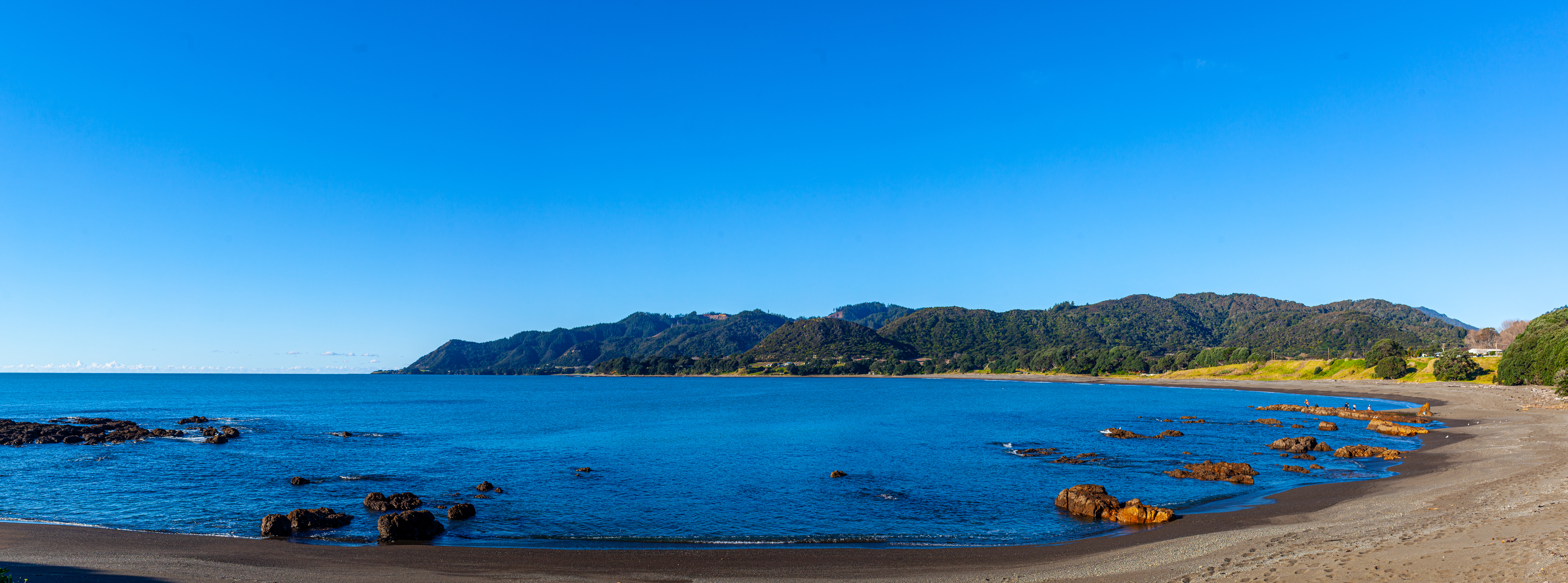
- Te Kaha Bay
- Interactive map of Te Kaha
- Coordinates: 37°44′25″S 177°40′35″E
- Country: New Zealand
- Region: Bay of Plenty
- Territorial authority: Ōpōtiki District
- Ward: Coast Ward
- Community: Coast Community
- Electorates: East Cape; Waiariki (Māori)

Government
  - Territorial authority: Ōpōtiki District Council
  - Regional council: Bay of Plenty Regional Council
  - Mayor of Ōpōtiki: David Moore
  - East Cape MP: Dana Kirkpatrick
  - Waiariki MP: Rawiri Waititi

Area
  - Total: 16.17 km^{2} (6.24 sq mi)

Population (June 2025)
  - Total: 390
  - Density: 24/km^{2} (62/sq mi)

Te Kaha is a small New Zealand community situated in the Bay of Plenty near Ōpōtiki. Its full name is Te-Kahanui-A-Tikirākau. The New Zealand Ministry for Culture and Heritage gives a translation of "the rope" for Te Kaha, but local sources give a bawdier derivation Te Kaha is a little outpost that contains a couple of dairies and the Te Kaha resort.

== Marae ==
The township is in the rohe (tribal area) of Te Whānau-ā-Apanui. It has four marae, affiliated with local hapū:

- Te Kaha Marae and Tūkākī meeting house, is affiliated with Te Whānau a Te Ēhutu.
- Maungaroa Marae and Kaiaio meeting house, is affiliated with Te Whānau a Kaiaio.
- Pāhāōa Marae and Kahurautao meeting house, is affiliated with Te Whānau a Kahurautao.
- Waiōrore Marae and Toihau meeting house, is affiliated with Te Whānau a Toihau / Hinetekahu.

In October 2020, the Government committed $497,610 from the Provincial Growth Fund to upgrade the Pāhāōa Marae, creating 14 jobs. It also committed $1,646,820 upgrade a cluster of 6 marae, including Maungaroa Marae, creating 10 jobs.

== Demographics ==
Statistics New Zealand describes Te Kaha as a rural settlement, which covers 16.17 km^{2} (6.24 sq mi). It had an estimated population of 390 as of June 2025, with a population density of 24 people per km^{2}. It is part of the larger Cape Runaway statistical area.

Historical population
Year	Pop.	±% p.a.
2006	303	—
2013	387	+3.56%
2018	327	−3.31%
2023	378	+2.94%

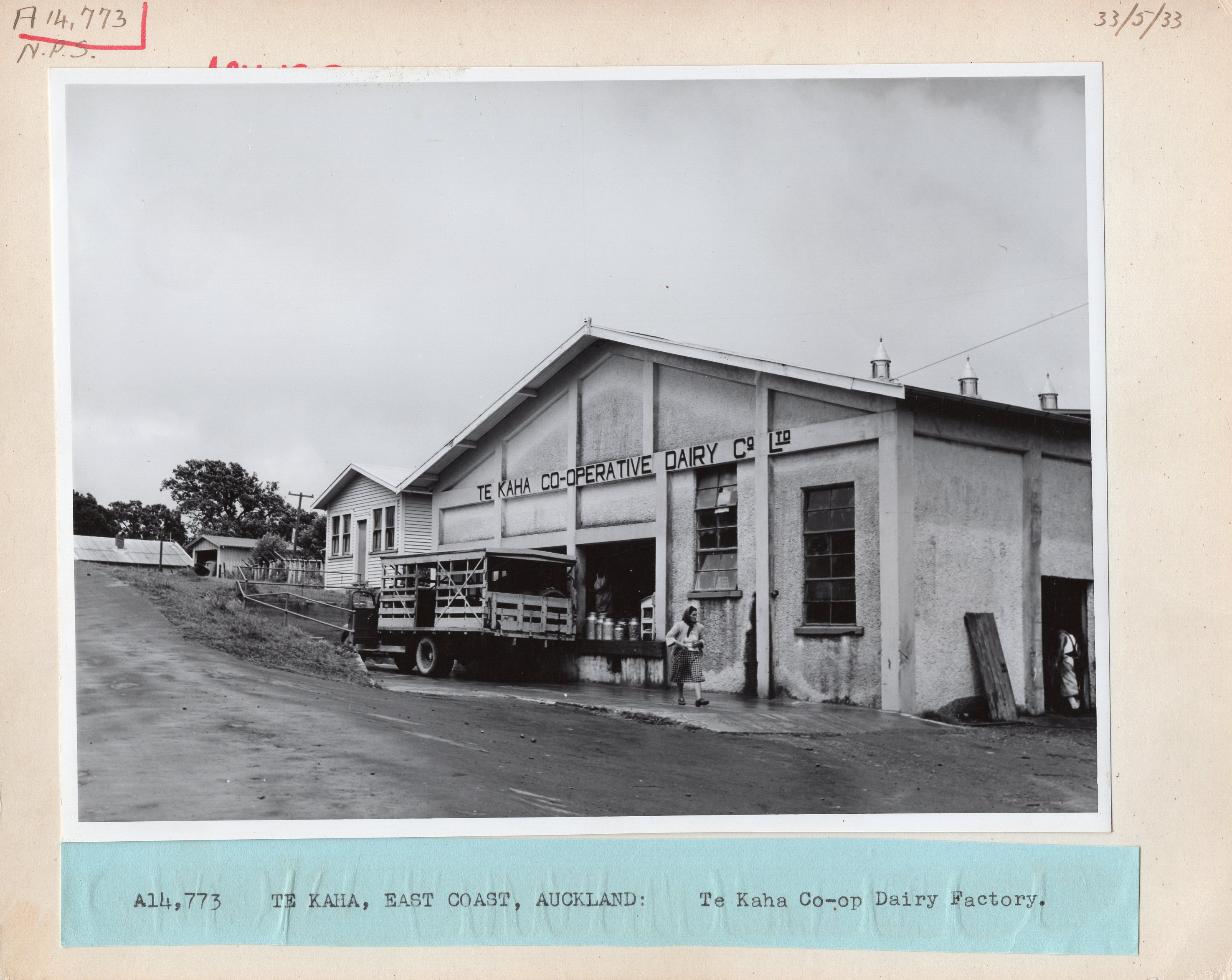
Te Kaha Co-op Dairy Factory

Te Kaha had a population of 378 in the 2023 New Zealand census, an increase of 51 people (15.6%) since the 2018 census, and a decrease of 9 people (−2.3%) since the 2013 census. There were 180 males and 195 females in 153 dwellings. 2.4% of people identified as LGBTIQ+. The median age was 45.7 years (compared with 38.1 years nationally). There were 75 people (19.8%) aged under 15 years, 57 (15.1%) aged 15 to 29, 165 (43.7%) aged 30 to 64, and 81 (21.4%) aged 65 or older.

People could identify as more than one ethnicity. The results were 34.9% European (Pākehā), 85.7% Māori, 4.0% Pasifika, and 1.6% Asian. English was spoken by 95.2%, Māori by 42.9%, and other languages by 1.6%. No language could be spoken by 0.8% (e.g. too young to talk). New Zealand Sign Language was known by 0.8%. The percentage of people born overseas was 7.1, compared with 28.8% nationally.

Religious affiliations were 36.5% Christian, 15.9% Māori religious beliefs, and 1.6% New Age. People who answered that they had no religion were 38.9%, and 7.9% of people did not answer the census question.

Of those at least 15 years old, 21 (6.9%) people had a bachelor's or higher degree, 186 (61.4%) had a post-high school certificate or diploma, and 87 (28.7%) people exclusively held high school qualifications. The median income was $28,100, compared with $41,500 nationally. 12 people (4.0%) earned over $100,000 compared to 12.1% nationally. The employment status of those at least 15 was 126 (41.6%) full-time, 27 (8.9%) part-time, and 21 (6.9%) unemployed.

== Education ==
Te Kura o Te Whānau-a-Apanui is a coeducational composite (years 1–13) school with a roll of 190 students as of July 2026. The school opened in 2016 to replace three East Cape schools: Whānau-ā-Apanui Area School (opened in 1875 as Te Kaha School), Raukōkore School (opened in 1887) and Te Kura o Ōmaio (opened in 1871). Te Kura o Te Whānau-a-Apanui started on the site of the previous school in Omaio while premises were built in Te Kaha and moved to the new site by 2023.

== Climate ==
Climate data for Te Kaha (1981–2010)
Month	Jan	Feb	Mar	Apr	May	Jun	Jul	Aug	Sep	Oct	Nov	Dec	Year
Mean daily maximum °C (°F)	23.2 (73.8)	23.8 (74.8)	22.8 (73.0)	20.4 (68.7)	18.2 (64.8)	15.8 (60.4)	15.2 (59.4)	15.5 (59.9)	16.8 (62.2)	18.1 (64.6)	19.4 (66.9)	21.6 (70.9)	19.2 (66.6)
Daily mean °C (°F)	19.2 (66.6)	19.8 (67.6)	18.3 (64.9)	16.1 (61.0)	14.0 (57.2)	11.9 (53.4)	11.1 (52.0)	11.3 (52.3)	12.8 (55.0)	14.3 (57.7)	15.6 (60.1)	17.9 (64.2)	15.2 (59.3)
Mean daily minimum °C (°F)	15.3 (59.5)	15.8 (60.4)	13.9 (57.0)	11.9 (53.4)	9.7 (49.5)	8.0 (46.4)	7.0 (44.6)	7.0 (44.6)	8.8 (47.8)	10.4 (50.7)	11.8 (53.2)	14.2 (57.6)	11.1 (52.1)
Source: NIWA

== Notable people ==
- Corporal Willie Apiata, recipient of the New Zealand Victoria Cross, awarded on 2 July 2007
- Moana-Nui-a-Kiwa Ngarimu, recipient of the VC, awarded posthumously in October 1943
- Taika Waititi, Filmmaker, actor, comedian
