= Waiaua =

Rural settlement in Ōpotiki District, New Zealand

Coordinates: 38.002420°S 177.397368°E

Waiaua or Lower Waiaua is a rural community in the Ōpōtiki District and Bay of Plenty Region of New Zealand's North Island, located around the lower part of the Waiaua River.

The area is in the traditional tribal area of Whakatōhea.

The New Zealand Ministry for Culture and Heritage gives a translation of "waters containing herring" for Waiaua. Aua is usually translated as yellow-eye mullet.

== History ==
=== Early settlement ===
Whakatōhea originally settled the flat lower river due to its abundance of ocean, ground and river food.

The following exclamation is attributed to Whakatōhea ancestor Tāpuikākahu:

Ah the food at Wai-aua!
’Twas a sleeping house for you, for all men,
Where nets are hauled upon the beach.

=== Modern history ===
The local Whakatōhea hapū, Ngāti Patumoana or Ngāti Patu, moved their homes and marae to Waiaua after their land at Paerata was confiscated. The group takes its name from the event in which their ancestor, Hineiahua, was pursued and killed by Ngāpuhi at the Waiaua River mouth.

Members of the hapū, such as the iwi elder Tiwai Amoamo, farmed the area during the 20th century.

The low-lying valley has regularly flooded after heavy rainfall during the 20th and 21st century. Roads in the area were closed for several days in February 2018.

In 2011, the New Zealand Government signed a formal pardon at Waiaua Marae for a local man, Mokomoko, who was wrongly hanged for murder in 1886, leading to the confiscation of Whakatōhea land.

== Marae ==
Waiaua Marae is the traditional tribal meeting ground of the Whakatōhea hapū of Ngāti Patumoana or Ngāti Patu. It includes the Ruamoko meeting house, opened in 1899.

In July 2020, Government minister Andrew Little visited the marae for Treaty of Waitangi negotiations with Whakatōhea.

In October 2020, the Government committed $744,574 from the Provincial Growth Fund to renovate the marae and two other Whakatōhea marae, creating an estimated 30 jobs.
