= Opape =

Coastal settlement in the Bay of Plenty, New Zealand

- Locality
- Interactive map of Opape
- Coordinates: 37.976°S 177.423°E
- Country: New Zealand
- Region: Bay of Plenty
- Territorial authority: Ōpōtiki District
- Ward: Waioeka-Waiōtahe-Otara Ward
- Electorates: East Cape; Waiariki (Māori)

Government
  - Territorial authority: Ōpōtiki District Council
  - Regional council: Bay of Plenty Regional Council
  - Mayor of Ōpōtiki: David Moore
  - East Cape MP: Dana Kirkpatrick
  - Waiariki MP: Rawiri Waititi

Area
  - Total: 13.74 km^{2} (5.31 sq mi)

Population (2023 Census)
  - Total: 243
  - Density: 17.7/km^{2} (45.8/sq mi)
- Postcode(s): 3197

Opape is a small coastal settlement in the Ōpōtiki District of the Bay of Plenty Region on New Zealand's North Island. It is 2 km (1.2 mi) east of Omarumutu

Opape is the eastern end of the traditional territory of the Whakatōhea Māori iwi. When most of Whakatōhea's land was confiscated by the Crown in the 1860s, most of the iwi was crowded into the 20,300-acre Ōpape Native Reserve, which included coastal Opape and inland hills.

== Demographics ==
Opape locality covers 13.74 km^{2} (5.31 sq mi). It is part of the Ōtara-Tirohanga statistical area.

Historical population
Year	Pop.	±% p.a.
2006	156	—
2013	156	+0.00%
2018	168	+1.49%
2023	243	+7.66%

Opape had a population of 243 in the 2023 New Zealand census, an increase of 75 people (44.6%) since the 2018 census, and an increase of 87 people (55.8%) since the 2013 census. There were 117 males and 120 females in 69 dwellings. The median age was 31.4 years (compared with 38.1 years nationally). There were 75 people (30.9%) aged under 15 years, 42 (17.3%) aged 15 to 29, 87 (35.8%) aged 30 to 64, and 42 (17.3%) aged 65 or older.

People could identify as more than one ethnicity. The results were 29.6% European (Pākehā), 90.1% Māori, and 3.7% Pasifika. English was spoken by 96.3%, Māori by 30.9%, and other languages by 1.2%. No language could be spoken by 2.5% (e.g. too young to talk). New Zealand Sign Language was known by 1.2%. The percentage of people born overseas was 3.7, compared with 28.8% nationally.

Religious affiliations were 19.8% Christian, and 19.8% Māori religious beliefs. People who answered that they had no religion were 56.8%, and 2.5% of people did not answer the census question.

Of those at least 15 years old, 15 (8.9%) people had a bachelor's or higher degree, 99 (58.9%) had a post-high school certificate or diploma, and 51 (30.4%) people exclusively held high school qualifications. The median income was $30,800, compared with $41,500 nationally. 9 people (5.4%) earned over $100,000 compared to 12.1% nationally. The employment status of those at least 15 was 66 (39.3%) full-time, 30 (17.9%) part-time, and 6 (3.6%) unemployed.

== Marae ==
Opape Marae and Muriwai meeting house is a traditional meeting place of the Whakatōhea hapū of Ngāi Tamahaua (Ngāi Tama). In October 2020, the Government committed $744,574 from the Provincial Growth Fund to upgrade the marae and two other Whakatōhea marae, creating 30 jobs.
