= Winiata =

Winiata may refer to

- Maharaia Winiata (1912–1960), New Zealand tribal leader, Methodist minister, teacher, anthropologist and broadcaster
- Selica Winiata (born 1986), New Zealand rugby union player
- Winiata railway station in New Zealand
- Whatarangi Winiata, New Zealand accountant, academic, and Māori leader
