= Cape Runaway =

Cape and locality in the Bay of Plenty, New Zealand

Cape Runaway Whangaparāoa
- Locality
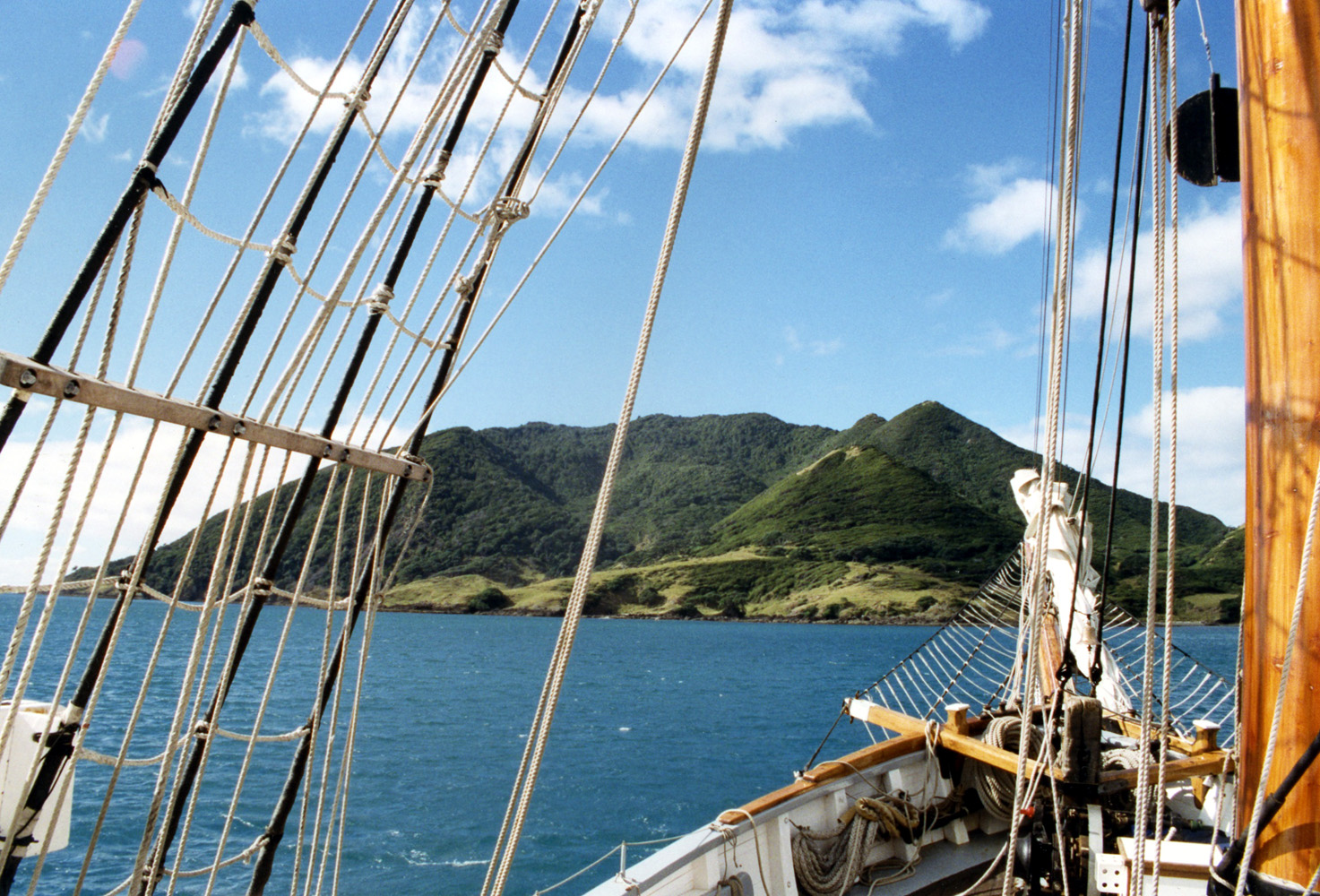
- Interactive map of Cape Runaway
- Coordinates: 37.5389°S 177.9829°E
- Country: New Zealand
- Region: Bay of Plenty
- Territorial authority: Ōpōtiki District
- Ward: Coast Ward
- Community: Coast Community
- Electorates: East Cape; Waiariki (Māori)

Government
  - Territorial authority: Ōpōtiki District Council
  - Regional council: Bay of Plenty Regional Council
  - Mayor of Ōpōtiki: David Moore
  - East Cape MP: Dana Kirkpatrick
  - Waiariki MP: Rawiri Waititi

Area
  - Total: 64.03 km^{2} (24.72 sq mi)

Population (2023 Census)
  - Total: 138
  - Density: 2.16/km^{2} (5.58/sq mi)
- Postcode(s): 3199

Cape Runaway (Māori: Whangaparāoa) is the eastern extremity of the Bay of Plenty in New Zealand's North Island. It is located 157 kilometres northeast off Whakatāne and 65 kilometres west of East Cape. It is a predominantly Māori region, with 85.7% of the population being ethnically Māori and 47.6% of the population being able to speak the Māori language as of the 2018 census.

The name Cape Runaway was bestowed by English mariner James Cook during his first voyage of discovery in 1769. It was so named after Māori in canoes who had approached Cooks' ship Endeavour in a hostile manner scurried off after a cannon shot was fired.

== Demographics ==
Cape Runaway locality covers 64.03 km^{2} (24.72 sq mi). It is part of the Cape Runaway statistical area.

Historical population for the locality
Year	Pop.	±% p.a.
2006	105	—
2013	117	+1.56%
2018	111	−1.05%
2023	138	+4.45%

The locality had a population of 138 in the 2023 New Zealand census, an increase of 27 people (24.3%) since the 2018 census, and an increase of 21 people (17.9%) since the 2013 census. There were 75 males and 63 females in 48 dwellings. 2.2% of people identified as LGBTIQ+. The median age was 35.8 years (compared with 38.1 years nationally). There were 36 people (26.1%) aged under 15 years, 24 (17.4%) aged 15 to 29, 60 (43.5%) aged 30 to 64, and 21 (15.2%) aged 65 or older.

People could identify as more than one ethnicity. The results were 19.6% European (Pākehā), 95.7% Māori, 10.9% Pasifika, and 2.2% Asian. English was spoken by 93.5%, and Māori by 63.0%. No language could be spoken by 2.2% (e.g. too young to talk). The percentage of people born overseas was 0.0, compared with 28.8% nationally.

Religious affiliations were 45.7% Christian, 23.9% Māori religious beliefs, and 2.2% other religions. People who answered that they had no religion were 19.6%, and 8.7% of people did not answer the census question.

Of those at least 15 years old, 27 (26.5%) people had a bachelor's or higher degree, 57 (55.9%) had a post-high school certificate or diploma, and 21 (20.6%) people exclusively held high school qualifications. The median income was $30,500, compared with $41,500 nationally. 6 people (5.9%) earned over $100,000 compared to 12.1% nationally. The employment status of those at least 15 was 45 (44.1%) full-time, 24 (23.5%) part-time, and 6 (5.9%) unemployed.

=== Cape Runaway statistical area ===
Cape Runaway statistical area, which includes Tōrere, Hāwai, Ōmāio, Te Kaha, Papatea Bay and Raukokore, covers 1,568.88 km^{2} (605.75 sq mi) and had an estimated population of 1,950 as of June 2025, with a population density of 1.24 people per km^{2}.

Historical population for the statistical area
Year	Pop.	±% p.a.
2006	1,680	—
2013	1,533	−1.30%
2018	1,449	−1.12%
2023	1,881	+5.36%

Cape Runaway statistical area had a population of 1,881 in the 2023 New Zealand census, an increase of 432 people (29.8%) since the 2018 census, and an increase of 348 people (22.7%) since the 2013 census. There were 939 males and 942 females in 717 dwellings. 2.1% of people identified as LGBTIQ+. The median age was 44.2 years (compared with 38.1 years nationally). There were 372 people (19.8%) aged under 15 years, 318 (16.9%) aged 15 to 29, 801 (42.6%) aged 30 to 64, and 390 (20.7%) aged 65 or older.

People could identify as more than one ethnicity. The results were 29.5% European (Pākehā); 87.2% Māori; 5.4% Pasifika; 0.6% Asian; 0.3% Middle Eastern, Latin American and African New Zealanders (MELAA); and 0.3% other, which includes people giving their ethnicity as "New Zealander". English was spoken by 95.4%, Māori by 43.9%, Samoan by 0.2%, and other languages by 1.0%. No language could be spoken by 1.9% (e.g. too young to talk). New Zealand Sign Language was known by 0.6%. The percentage of people born overseas was 4.8, compared with 28.8% nationally.

Religious affiliations were 32.2% Christian, 23.9% Māori religious beliefs, 0.3% Buddhist, 0.5% New Age, and 0.3% other religions. People who answered that they had no religion were 35.9%, and 9.1% of people did not answer the census question.

Of those at least 15 years old, 174 (11.5%) people had a bachelor's or higher degree, 867 (57.5%) had a post-high school certificate or diploma, and 471 (31.2%) people exclusively held high school qualifications. The median income was $26,400, compared with $41,500 nationally. 51 people (3.4%) earned over $100,000 compared to 12.1% nationally. The employment status of those at least 15 was 555 (36.8%) full-time, 189 (12.5%) part-time, and 129 (8.5%) unemployed.

== Marae ==
Whangaparāōa Marae, located near Cape Runaway, is a traditional meeting place for Te Whānau-ā-Apanui's hapū of Te Whānau a Kauaetangohia.

It includes Kauaetangohia or Te Putahou meeting house.

== Education ==
Te Kura Mana Māori o Whangaparaoa is a co-educational Māori immersion composite school, with a roll of 79 as of July 2026. The school celebrated its centenary in 2014.
