= Waiaua River (Bay of Plenty) =

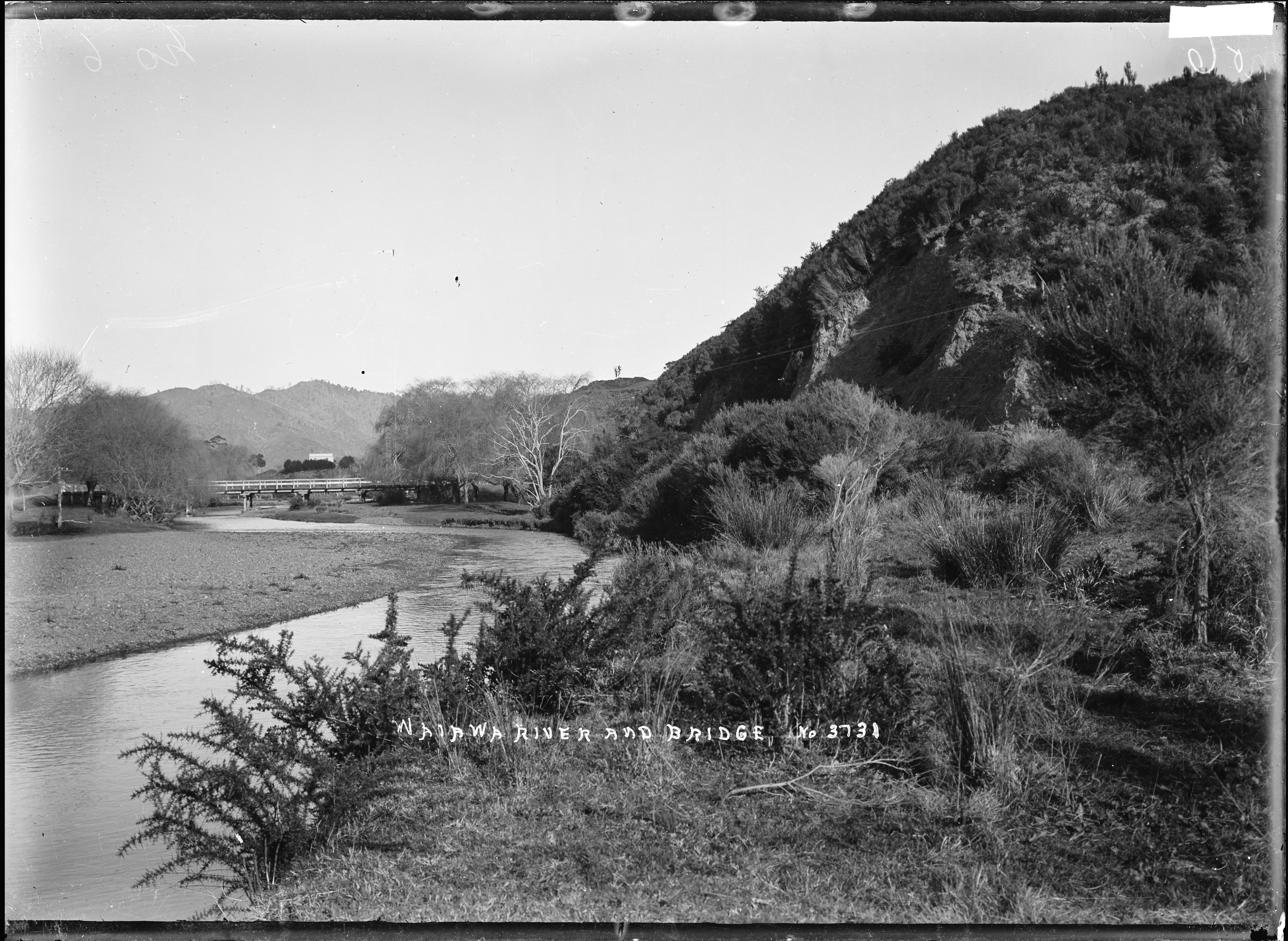
- The Waiaua River in the early 1900s
- Route of the Waiaua River
- Mouth of the Waiaua River Waiaua River (Bay of Plenty) (North Island)

Location
- Country: New Zealand

Physical characteristics
- Source: Confluence of the Mangaongaonga Stream and Te Maungamutu Stream
  - coordinates: 38°03′30″S 177°27′36″E
- Mouth
  - location: Bay of Plenty
  - coordinates: 37°59′13″S 177°23′20″E
  - elevation: 0 m (0 ft)
- Length: 16 km (10 mi)

Basin features
- Progression: Waiaua River → Bay of Plenty → Pacific Ocean
- Tributaries
  - left: Mangapouri Stream, Oteakona Stream, Taheke Stream
  - right: Te Whaiti Stream
- Bridges: Waiaua River Bridge

The Waiaua River is a river of the Bay of Plenty Region of New Zealand's North Island. It flows generally northwest to reach the eastern end of the Bay of Plenty 10 kilometres (6 mi) east of Ōpōtiki.

The New Zealand Ministry for Culture and Heritage gives a translation of "waters containing herring" for Waiaua. Aua is usually translated as yellow-eye mullet.

== See also ==
- List of rivers of New Zealand
