= Ngāitai =

Māori tribe centred in the Bay of Plenty Region, New Zealand

- Iwi (tribe) in Māoridom
- Rohe (region): Bay of Plenty
- Website: ngaitai.iwi.nz

Ngāitai is a Māori iwi (tribe) centred around Tōrere in the eastern Bay of Plenty of New Zealand.

== See also ==
- List of Maori iwi
