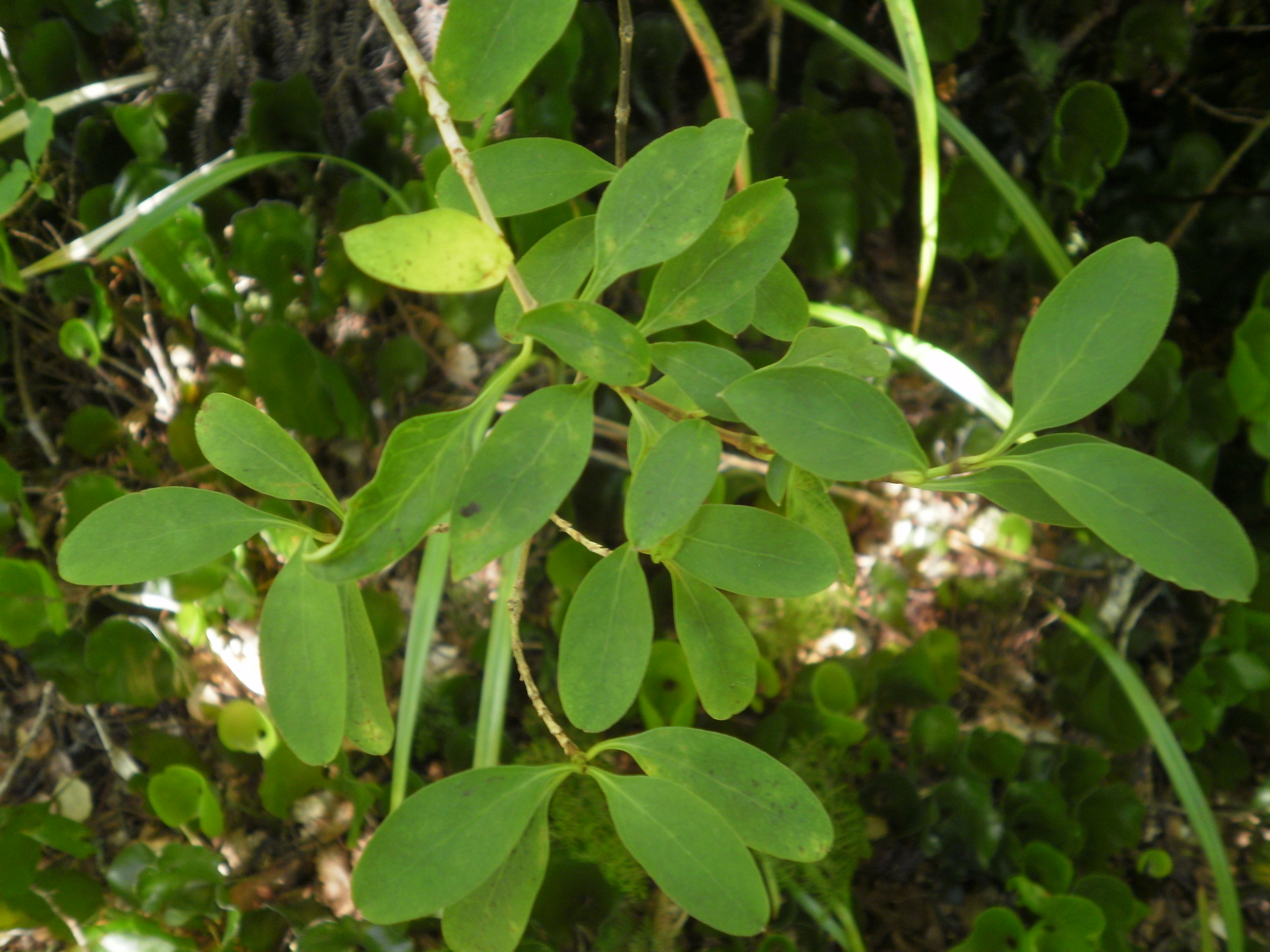
- The leaves of Coprosma foetidissima

Conservation status
- Least Concern (IUCN 3.1)

- Not Threatened (NZ TCS)

Scientific classification
- Kingdom: Plantae
- Clade: Tracheophytes
- Clade: Angiosperms
- Clade: Eudicots
- Clade: Asterids
- Order: Gentianales
- Family: Rubiaceae
- Genus: Coprosma
- Species: C. foetidissima

Binomial name
- Coprosma foetidissima J.R.Forst. & G.Forst.

= Coprosma foetidissima =

Species of plant

Coprosma foetidissima, commonly known as stinkwood or hūpiro (Māori), is a species of flowering plant in the family Rubiaceae, native to mainland New Zealand as well as Stewart Island and the Auckland Islands. It grows as a shrub or small tree, and is found in coastal to sub-alpine forest and shrubland. Its distinctive characteristic is the unpleasant, rotten cabbage smell produced when its leaves are crushed.

== Taxonymy and etymology ==
Coprosma foetidissima is in the family Rubiaceae, and was described in 1776 by Johann Reinhold Forster and Georg Forster. The species is named stinkwood and foetidissima because of the foul smell produced when the leaves are crushed. During the second voyage of James Cook, Johann Forster reported that the plant gave off a smell like rotten cabbage. The smell is caused by the sulphur compound methanethiol (or methyl mercaptan). The name for the genus Coprosma is derived from this species. In Ancient Greek, copros (κόπρος) means 'dung', and osme (ὀσμή) means 'smell'. However, despite this species being the basis of the name for the entire genus, most of the other species in the genus do not smell in this way. The specific epithet foetidissima. is derived from Latin, where "foetidus" means "stinking" or "bad-smelling" with the superlative suffix implying great intensity. The name of the species in the Māori language is hūpiro.

In his report on a botanical survey of the Auckland Islands as part of the Antarctic voyages of HMS Erebus from 1839-1843, Joseph Dalton Hooker recalled collecting a specimen of C. foetidissima:

The whole plant, especially when bruised or when drying, exhales an exceedingly fetid odour, much resembling that of the flowers of Hibbertia volubilis. I brought on board the Erebus specimens of this with the other plants late one evening, and finding that there were more tender species, which took a considerable time to lay in paper than I could well get through that night, I locked this Coprosma in a small close cabin until I should have leisure to press it, but before half an hour had elapsed the smell was intolerable, and had pervaded the whole of the lower deck.

The type specimen, recorded by Georg Forster in 1772, is held in the vascular plants collection of the University of Göettingen.

== Description ==
C. foetidissima grows as a small open branched tree or shrub, typically up to 3 m (9.8 ft) tall, but in the Auckland Islandsreaching heights of 6 m (20 ft), with a trunk up to 45 cm (18 in) in diameter. The bark is dark brown, and the branchlets are glabrous (lacking hairs). The interpetiolar stipules are shorter than those of many other coprosma species and taper to a conspicuous tooth fringed by fine short hairs and with uneven tufts of hairs at the tips. Leaves are thin, 30-50 mm long, 14-20 mm wide, somewhat leathery-textured, and shaped obovate to oblong to broadly ovate. Leaf tips may be rounded or have a small tapered point. The leaves lie in a single plane on the branchlet. The leaves of C. foetidissima (and many other species of Rubiaceae) have domatia, small indentations on the underside that may be occupied by potentially beneficial insects such as mites and other arthropods.

C. foetidissima is dioecious, meaning that male and female flowers are borne on separate plants. Flowering occurs between October and November. The flowers are solitary and occur on the ends of branchlets. The calyx of male flowers is cup-like with four or five teeth; the corolla is bell-shaped, 4 or 8 lobed to the middle; and anthers are large, elongate-oblong in shape, and as long as the corolla. Female flowers have a short, narrowly ovoid, tubular, and toothed calyx and the corolla is a curved tube with 4 or 5 splits extending one-third to halfway down. The styles are long and substantial. Fruiting occurs between March and July. The drupes are 7–10 mm (0.28–0.39 in) in length with an oblong shape. They are yellow to orange-red in colour, and are dispersed primarily by birds.

== Distribution ==
C. foetidissima is endemic to New Zealand and found from the Coromandel Peninsula southwards to Stewart Island, and on the Auckland Islands. It grows in coastal to sub-alpine forest and shrubland.

== Ecology ==
A wide range of endemic insects feed on C. foetidissima, including three species of gall mites in the family Eriophyidae, five species of caterpillars of moths or butterflies in the families Gracillariidae, Tortricidae and Geometridae, eight species of scale insects and sucking bugs in the families Aleyrodidae, Eriococcidae, Diaspididae and Miridae, and larvae of one species of gall fly in the family Cecidomyiidae. Seven species of weevil in the family Curculionidae live in dead wood. The Wellington tree wētā Hemideina crassidens, has also been observed feeding on leaves.

== Conservation status ==
C. foetidissima was listed as Not Threatened in the 2023 New Zealand Threat Classification Series for vascular plants. It is listed as Least Concern in the 2025 IUCN Red List of Threatened Species.

== Gallery ==
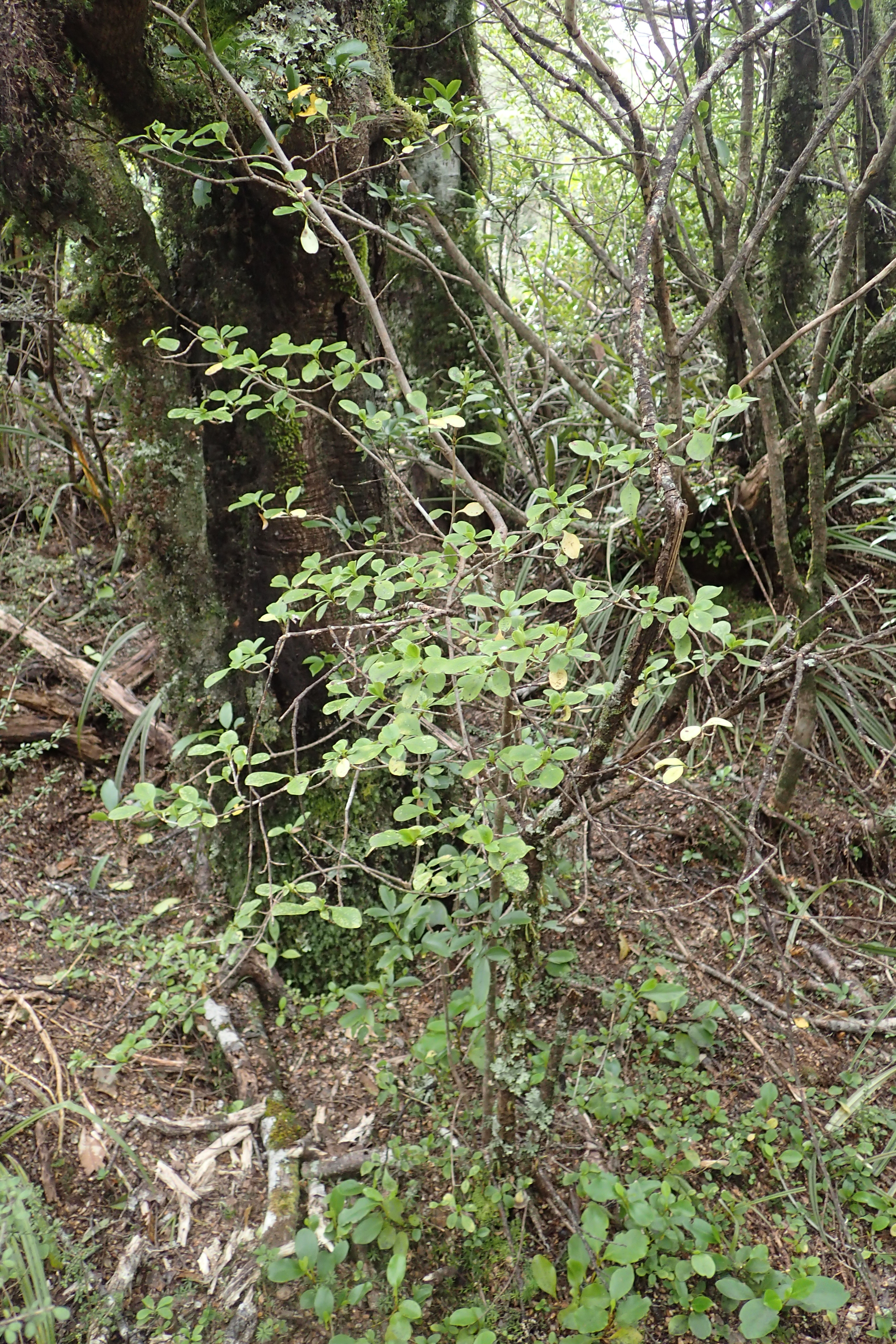

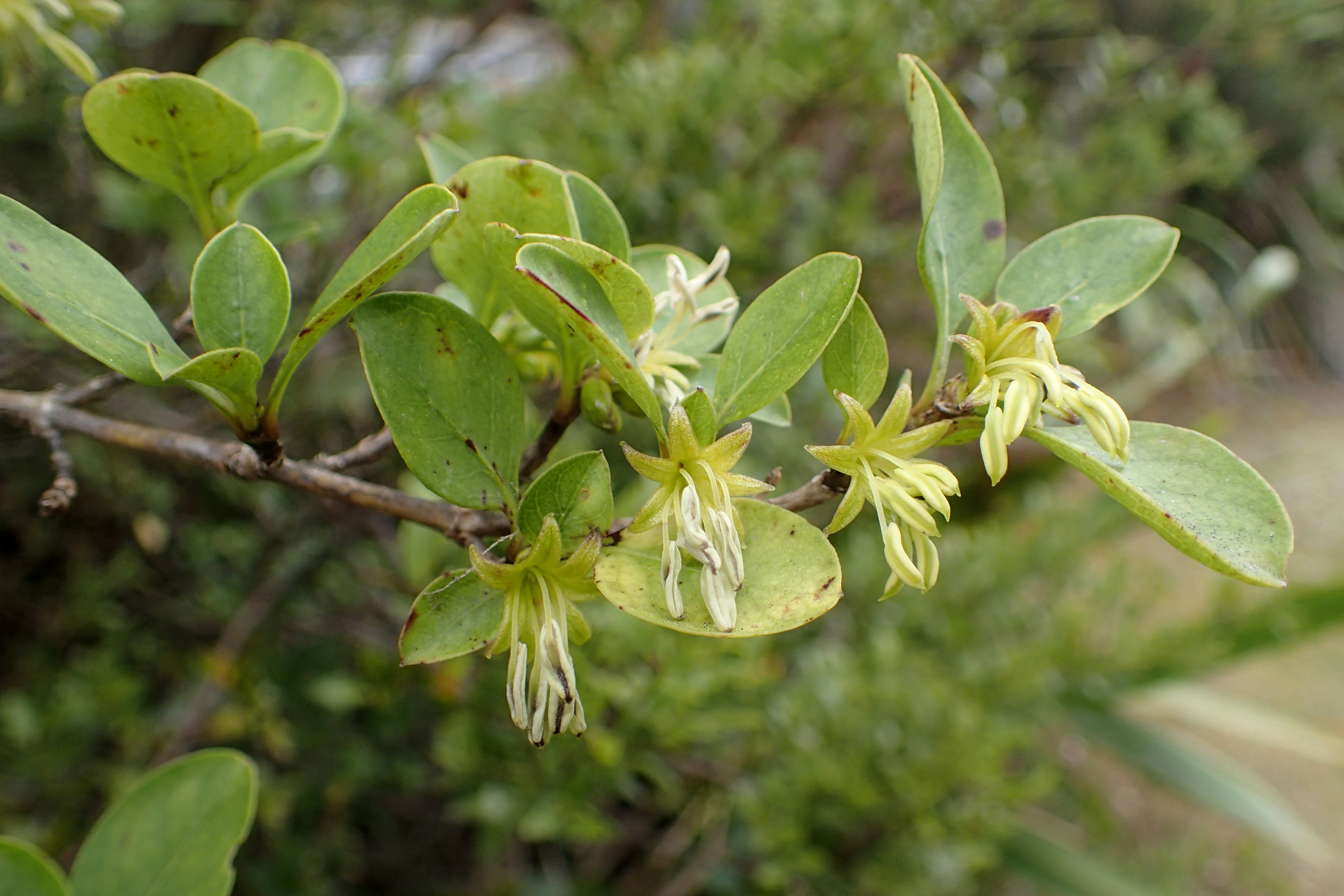

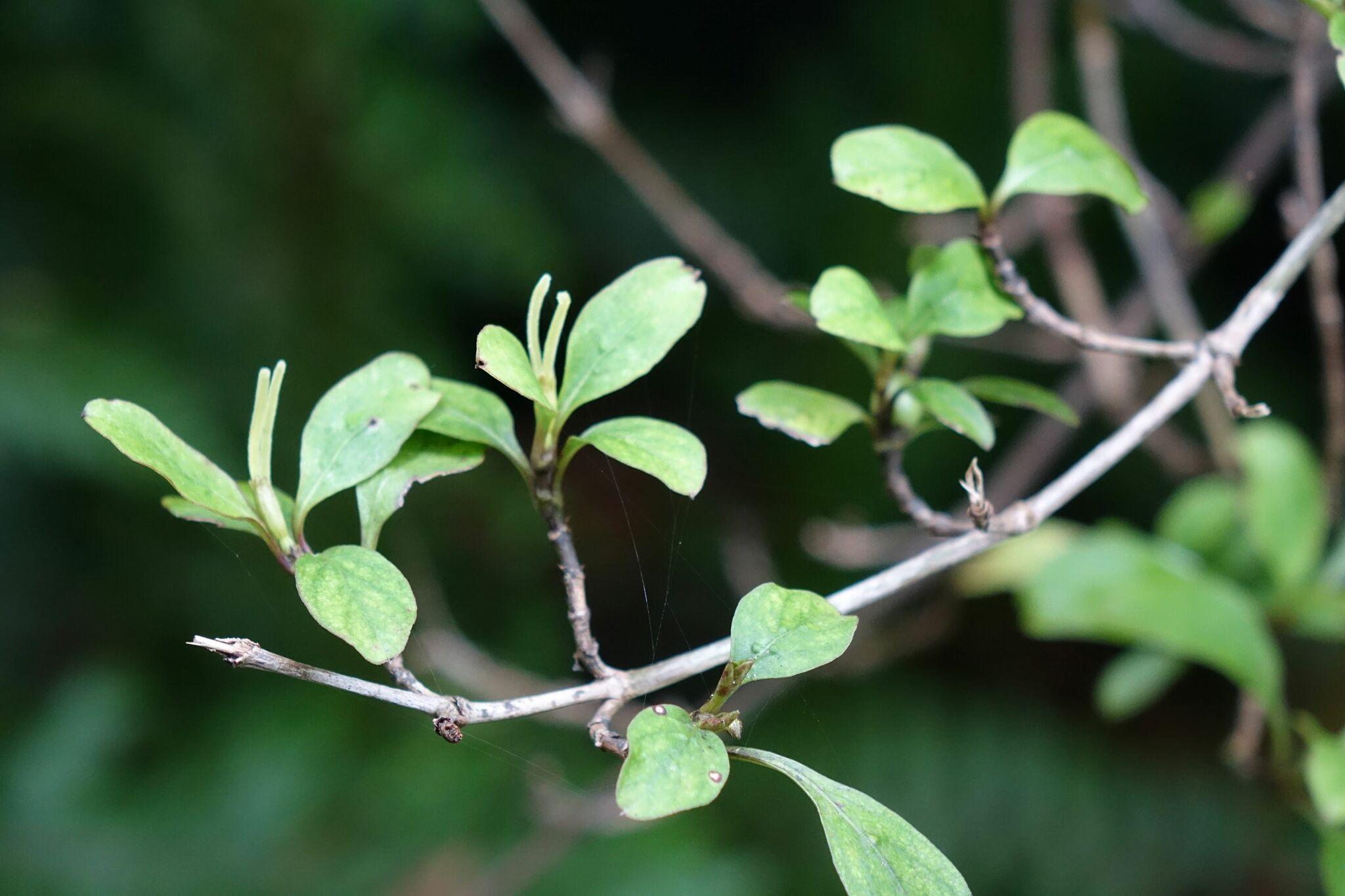

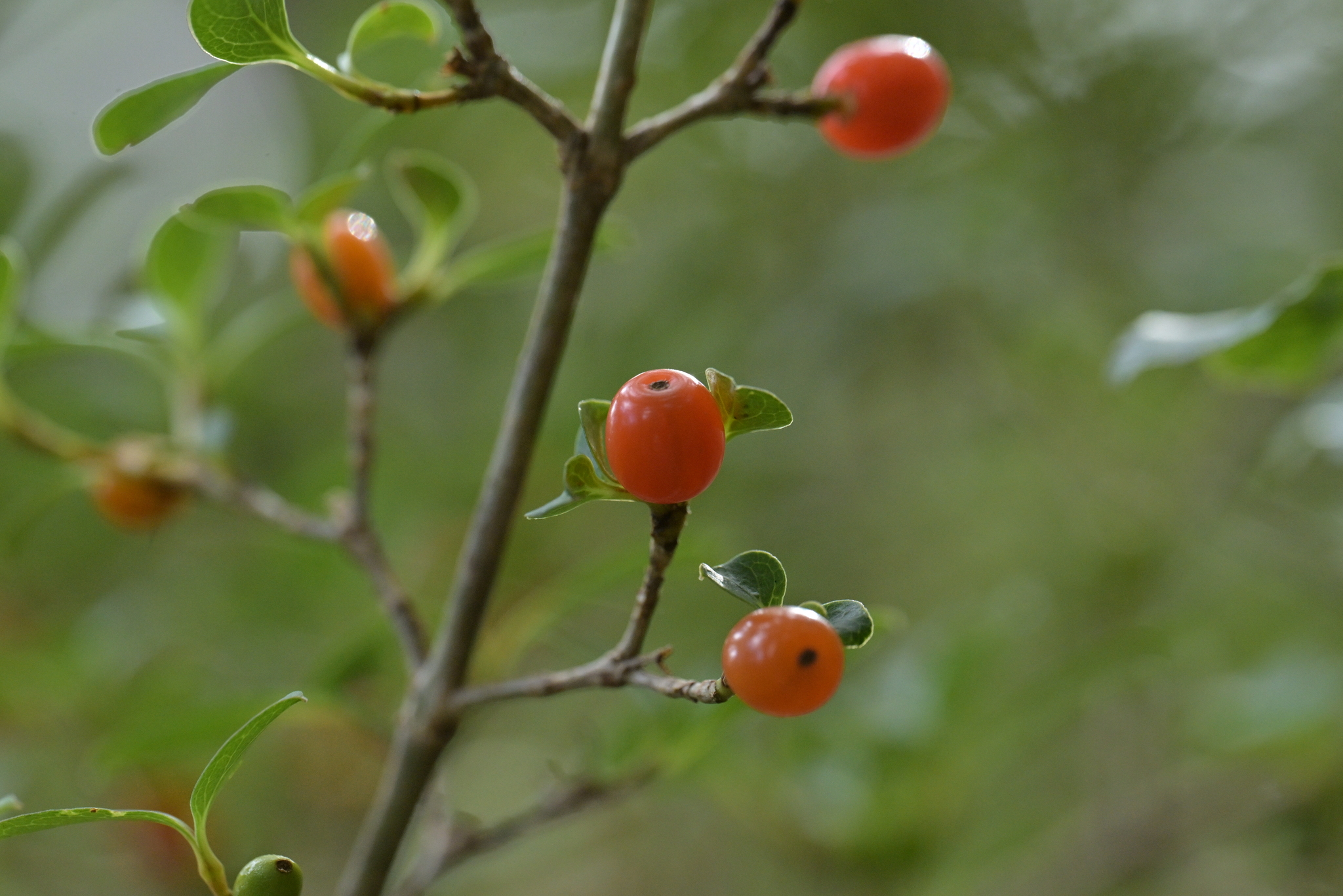

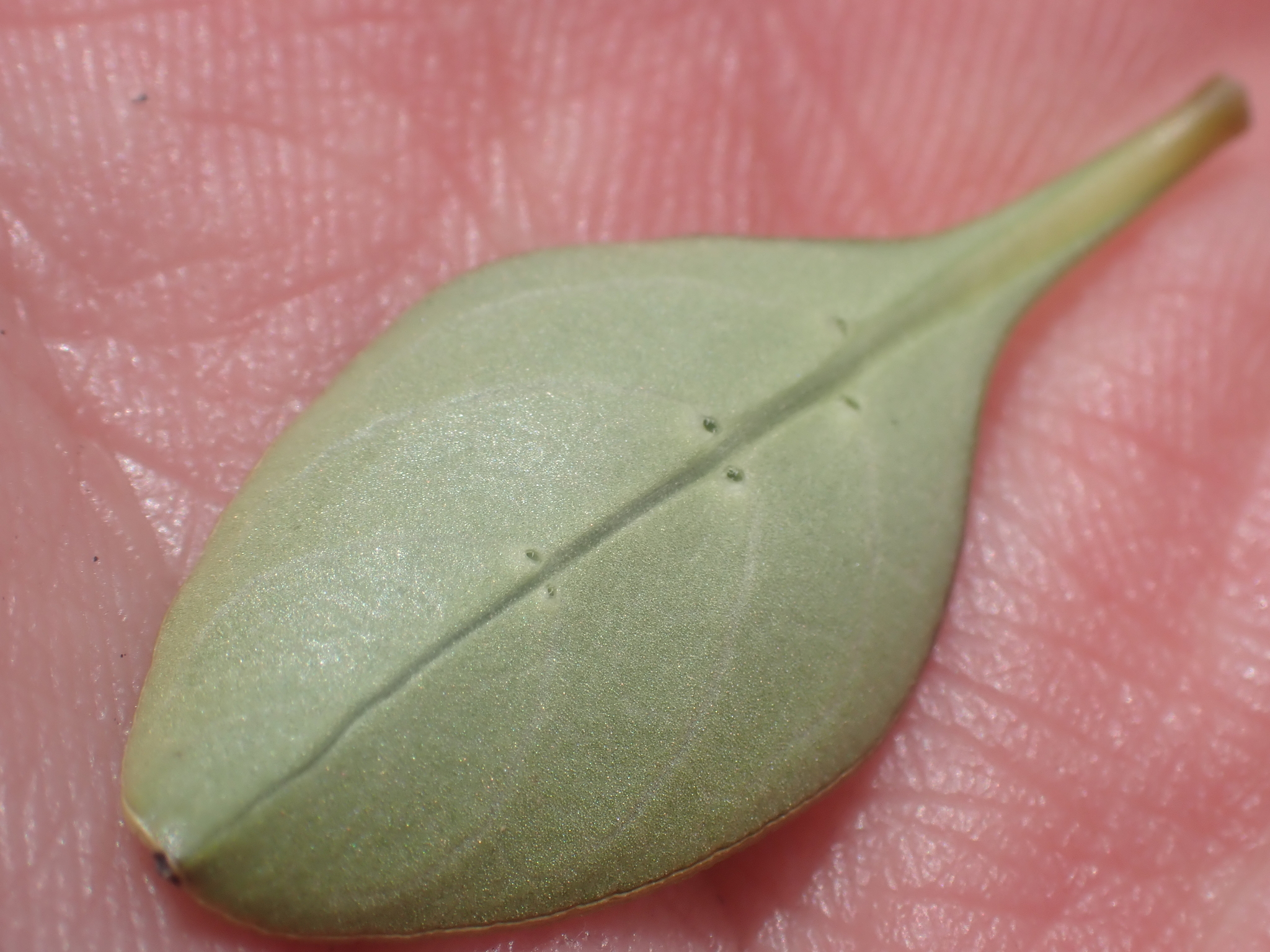

== Sources cited ==
- Dawson, J.; Lucas, R. (2019). New Zealand's Native Trees (2nd ed.). Nelson: Potton & Burton. ISBN 978-0-947503-98-7. OCLC 1126327869. OL 59801669M. Wikidata Q135564433.
- Salmon, J.T. (1996). The Native Trees of New Zealand. Auckland: Reed Books. ISBN 978-0-7900-0503-4. LCCN 2001431743. Wikidata Q135566328.
