= Maharaia Winiata =

Maharaia Winiata (1912–1960) was a notable New Zealand tribal leader, Methodist minister, teacher, anthropologist, broadcaster and community leader. Of Māori descent, he identified with the Ngāti Ranginui iwi. He was born in Ngahina Pa, Bay of Plenty, New Zealand in 1912.

== Early life and education ==
Winiata, born on the 29 September 1912, was the son of Winiata Piahana and his wife, Te Ruakawhena Kohu, both of Ngai Tamarawaho. He grew up near Tauranga and at the age of seven began primary school at Otumoetai. At the start of his formal education, he spoke only the Māori language. He had further primary education at Maungatapu and secondary education at Tauranga District High School. In 1935 he enrolled at Auckland University College and in 1937 was admitted to the Methodist Theological College, where he studied for three years, concurrently with his university work. He was the first Māori to study the full academic course for the ministry. Serving in the Home Guard during World War Two, he continued his education at Auckland Training College, obtaining a BA in 1943 and an MA in 1945. He was awarded the Nuffield fellowship in humanities in 1952 and used the money to study at the University of Edinburgh. He received his PhD in social anthropology from Edinburgh in 1954. His thesis, The changing role of the leader in Maori society, was published by Blackwood and Janet Paul in 1967.

Maharaia Winiata died suddenly at Tauranga, aged only 47, on 6 April 1960.
