= Ōpōtiki District =

- Territorial authority district
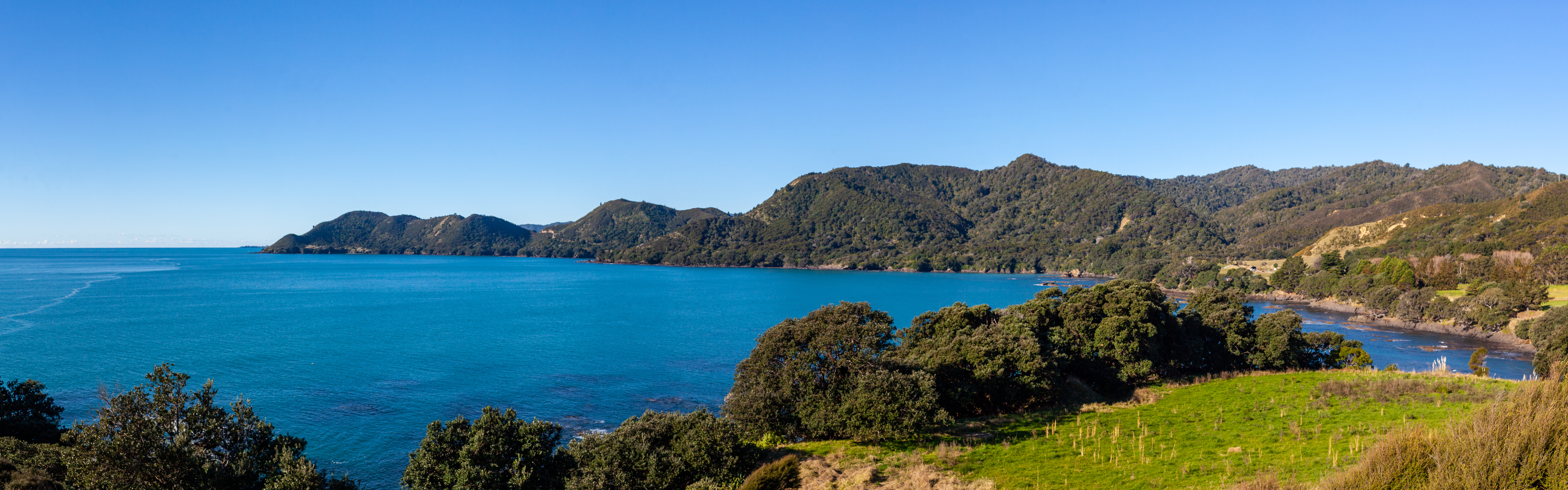

- Ōpōtiki district within the North Island
- Coordinates: 38°01′01″S 177°32′35″E
- Country: New Zealand
- Region: Bay of Plenty
- Wards: Coast; Ōpōtiki; Waioeka/Waiotahe
- Seat: Ōpōtiki

Government
  - Mayor: David Moore
  - Deputy Mayor: Maude Maxwell
  - Territorial authority: Ōpōtiki District Council

Area
  - Total: 3,101 km^{2} (1,197 sq mi)
  - Land: 3,089.70 km^{2} (1,192.94 sq mi)

Population (June 2025)
  - Total: 10,300
  - Density: 3.33/km^{2} (8.63/sq mi)
- Time zone: UTC+12 (NZST)
  - Summer (DST): UTC+13 (NZDT)
- Postcode(s): Map of postcodes
- Area code: 07
- Website: www.odc.govt.nz

Ōpōtiki District is a territorial authority district in the eastern Bay of Plenty Region on the North Island of New Zealand. It stretches from Kutarere and the eastern shore of Ōhiwa Harbour in the west to Cape Runaway in the north-east, and south from Ōpōtiki town up the Waioeka River into the Raukumara Range. Ōpōtiki District Council is headquartered in Ōpōtiki, the largest town.

The district has an area of 3101 square kilometres, of which 3090 square kilometres are land. The population was 10,300 as of June 2025.

== Council history ==
The Whakatane County Council established in 1876 included Ōpōtiki. Opotiki became a Town District in 1882. Opotiki County separated from Whakatane County in 1899 or 1900, and Opotiki town became a borough in 1908 or 1911. The borough and county merged in 1973. In the 1989 local government reforms, some parts of the Opotiki district became part of Whakatane District again.

== Geography ==
Ōpōtiki District is bounded on one long side by the eastern half of the Bay of Plenty embayment of the Pacific Ocean and on the other long side by the Raukumara mountain range, which rises (in the neighbouring Gisborne District) to 1,754 metres (5,755 ft) at Mount Hikurangi. The district stretches from Kutarere and the eastern shore of Ōhiwa Harbour in the west to Cape Runaway in the north-east, and south from Ōpōtiki town up the Waioeka River.

The district is predominantly steep hills dissected by fast-flowing rivers, the largest being the Mōtū. The coastal riverine floodplains (flats) and terraces (tablelands) provide the only flat land. Ōpōtiki township is situated on the largest flat at the conjunction of two of these, the Ōtara River and the Waioeka River. Sandy beaches, lower hills and larger flats are characteristic of the southwest area of the district; pebbly or rocky beaches and high hills coming right down to the sea are characteristic of the northeast. The human population is therefore concentrated in the coastal southwest.

== Geology ==
Geologically, the district is predominantly greywacke of Late Jurassic to Late Cretaceous age, draped by wind-blown loess during the Pleistocene Ice Ages and more recently covered in volcanic ash and pumice from the Rotorua and Taupō volcanic centres. The active volcano Whakaari/White Island lies offshore and represents a tsunami risk. Earthquakes are also a risk, but the district lies just off to the east of major fault lines and the risk is less than in other nearby areas. There are no valuable mineral resources, although the greywacke contains rare decapitated guyots which have been mined in the past for gold and copper.

== Botany ==
Natural vegetation is preserved in many parts of the district because of the unsuitability of steep land for cultivation. The district is at a natural geographic and climatic boundary. It is the southern limit for mangroves (Avicennia resinifera) on this side of the North Island of New Zealand, the southern limit for the coastal tree taraire (Beilschmiedia taraire), and the mountains are the furthest north for many New Zealand alpine plants (Ranunculus insignis, Ourisia caespitosa etc.). A remnant sea-level stand of an alpine southern beech (Nothofagus solandri) exists at the head of Ōhiwa Harbour, a drowned Ice Ages valley system.

Coastal forest consists of pōhutukawa trees, nikau palms, and many small shrubs belonging to genera such as Pseudopanax, Coprosma etc. Of particular note are a daisy-flowered shrub Olearia pachyphylla endemic to the district, and the rare large-flowered broom Carmichaelia williamsii.

Further inland is temperate rainforest. The canopy is dominated by tall trees such as tawa, pūriri and pukatea heavily populated by epiphytes (ferns, lily and orchid families) and lianas which include a pandanaceous climber (kiekie). The understory contains many ferns of various sizes, including tree ferns up to 10 m high, the giant stinging nettle Urtica ferox and the extremely poisonous tutu shrub.

In mountainous areas, the rainforest gives way to less dense Nothofagus beech forest. The understory is dominated by Gahnia sedges, with sparse shrubs such as the foul-smelling Coprosma foetidissima. Above the treeline there is tough-leaved Olearia shrub and alpine herbfield. The diminutive alpine tutu shrub Coriaria pottsiana is endemic to the district.

The lower river valleys and adjacent tablelands provide productive farming areas, whilst exotic plantings for commercial timber (mainly pinus radiata) occur on the fringes of the hill country.

== Zoology ==
Introduced animal species considered to be pests (deer, pig, goat, possum) are common in the forested areas and feral sheep and cattle can be found as ‘escapees’ from adjacent farmland. In the developed areas, birdlife is a mix of introduced pastoral species from Britain (blackbird, song thrush, various finches, sparrows, pheasant, mallard duck), California quail, and native species such as tūī, fantail, grey warbler, waxeye, kingfisher, pūkeko.

In the forested areas the birdlife is mainly native species which in addition to the above include wood pigeon (kererū), blue duck (whio), bellbird, morepork (native owl). During the past, the rare North Island kōkako (a blue-wattled bird) has been sighted.

Indigenous freshwater fish, apart from eels, are all small species and are caught as ‘whitebait’ in season. Introduced trout are found in some rivers. The district is rich in sea life such as molluscs (pipi, tuatua, kina, scallop), crayfish, edible fish such as snapper, kahawai and gurnard. Commercial aquaculture is beginning (mussel, oyster).

== History and culture ==
=== Early Māori history ===
The first known inhabitants of the district were probably members of the Tini o Toi people, who apparently derived from the Tākitimu waka which came to the Whakatāne area from Taranaki. There followed, perhaps a few generations later, the Tainui and Te Arawa people, from the first of which the present Ngaitai tribe claim direct descent. Also in this period were migrations by the Nukutere waka from Taranaki, and the Rangimatoru waka.

Several more generations later, the Mātaatua people arrived at Whakatāne from a place called Parinuitera, which could be either Young Nick's Head or a place on Ahuahu (Great Mercury Island). The present-day Te Whakatōhea and Te Whānau-ā-Apanui iwi claim descent from the intermarriage of Mātaatua with earlier migrants. The overland migration called Te Heke o Te Rangihouhiri, which eventually resulted in the Ngāi Te Rangi tribe of Tauranga, also contributed to the population.

One of the earliest Whakatōhea ancestors, Tarawa, deliberately concealed his origins and claimed to have swum to the district from across the sea, supported by supernatural fish he called his pets or children (‘pōtiki’). Coming ashore just west of Ōpōtiki, he installed his pets into a spring, which thereby became imbued with his mana. The spring ‘o pōtiki mai tawhiti’ (‘of the children from faraway’) became famous, and the short form of the name later came to be applied to the district as a whole. Ōpōtiki therefore means (the place) of children.

=== Late eighteenth to early nineteenth century ===
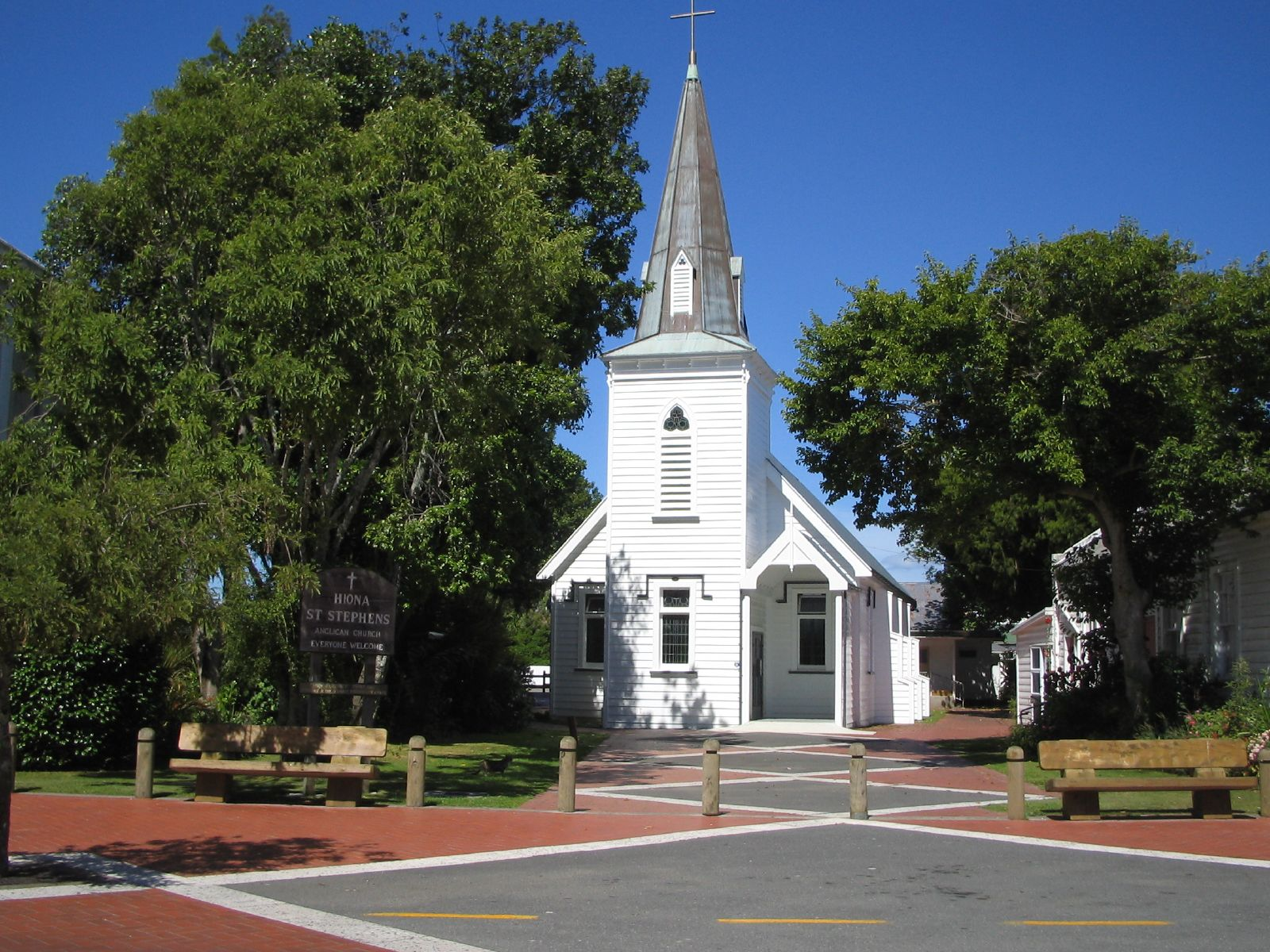
Hiona St Stephen's Anglican Church, completed by Reverend Carl Volkner in the 1860s.

The first contact between local Māori and Europeans was in 1769 when Captain James Cook passed down the Bay of Plenty coast. Early in the nineteenth century, a few European and American traders and whalers began to visit.

The 1820s saw numerous well-armed invasions by Ngāpuhi war parties from Northland. Although the Ōpōtiki iwi had begun to acquire firearms by that time, they were outgunned and had to retreat from the coast to the rugged forested interior.

The 1830s to 1840s were more peaceful, and the tribes again returned to the coast to take advantage of trading opportunities with trading and whaling ships. Māori Christian missionaries began to instruct in literacy and religion. In 1840, the Treaty of Waitangi was taken around to be signed, establishing British sovereignty in name at least. John A. Wilson, a lay missionary of the Church Missionary Society established the Ōpōtiki mission in 1840. Soon after, French missionaries moved into the area. At this period, the village at Ōpōtiki was known as Pā Kowhai. There were other important villages at Tunapāhore and Te Kaha.

The 1850s and early 1860s saw continued development. The Māori tribes took up European agricultural methods and crops, primarily wheat, pigs and peaches, which were traded with Auckland. There were still only a few Westerners living in the district, fewer still of whom were British by birth. Among these foreigners were Dr Albert Agassiz (1840–1910), a distant cousin of the famous Swiss/American scientist Louis Agassiz, and Carl Völkner, a German missionary who had gone over to the Anglican Church.

=== Warfare ===
The British invasion of the Waikato resulted in the Whakatōhea iwi lending their support to anti-British forces. In 1864, a war party was sent to assist the related Ngāi Te Rangi tribe, who had defeated the British at Gate Pā, but while making their way along the coast the war party was attacked by combined British and Te Arawa forces. The paramount chief of the Whakatōhea, Te Aporotanga, was taken prisoner and then executed by the wife of an Arawa chief who had been killed in the battle. While this action was compatible with ancient Māori custom, the fighting had hitherto been conducted according to Christianised rules of engagement, and this was accordingly taken as a sign that the British were no longer to be considered as a civilised enemy.

In accordance with Māori custom, utu (revenge) was taken by killing the missionary Völkner, who had been recruited as an agent by the British Governor, Sir George Grey, and who had been transmitting secret reports. The so-called "Volkner Incident" resulted in the invasion of Ōpōtiki by British forces in 1865. Within a few years, the Ōpōtiki district had been settled by military settlers, and the Maori tribes had been confined to villages with little land attached. A desultory guerilla war followed, led by Whakatōhea chief Hira te Popo and Tuhoe chief Eru Tamaikowha, but they eventually surrendered and were given amnesty.

Warfare again erupted in 1870 when the guerilla chief Te Kooti shifted his operations to the area. For a few years, he and his followers lived in the rugged Te Wera area in the extreme southwest of the Ōpōtiki district. After an amnesty was granted, he eventually moved to Ohiwa Harbour on the coast between Ōpōtiki and Whakatāne where he later died.

=== Recent history ===
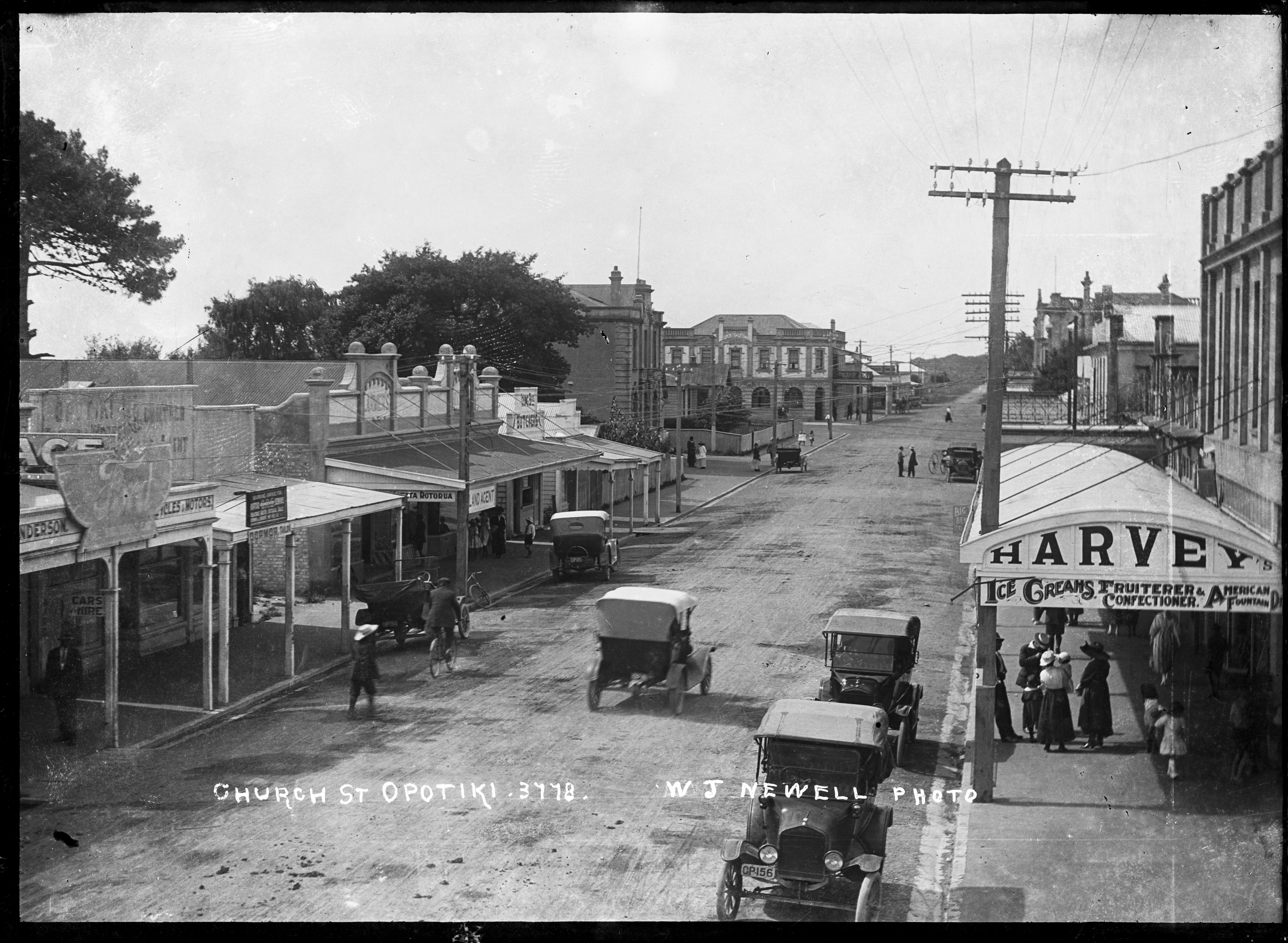
Ōpōtiki's Church Street, ca. 1920s.

When peace eventually came to the district, most of the cultivable land had been taken by British settlers and was converted to sheep and cattle (later dairy) farming. By the end of the nineteenth century, a generation of both settlers and Māori had grown up together and there was some form of accommodation, including intermarriage. The district lost men to the two World Wars, but an even greater blow was the Spanish flu pandemic of 1918–1919 which devastated small villages.

Because of the relatively small area of cultivable hinterland and a treacherous harbour entrance, early hopes of Ōpōtiki town becoming a major centre for the region were dashed. During the twentieth century, the town suffered from repeated shifts of businesses and local government to Whakatāne, a situation which has only begun to reverse very recently with increasing population. Major floods in the 1950s and 1960s led to the protection of the town by levees (‘stopbanks’) which have successfully prevented any further inundations. A major boost to prosperity occurred with the kiwifruit boom of the late twentieth century. Mussel farming is the next project to develop the town, alongside kiwifruit and bike riding on the Motu trail becoming popular with locals and tourists.

=== Iwi ===
Iwi based within the district are:

- Te Whakatōhea from Ohiwa Harbour to Opape, including Ōpōtiki township.
- Ngāitai are based in Tōrere.
- Te Whānau-ā-Apanui and hapu Te Ehutu cover the area from Hāwai to Potaka.

== Demographics ==
Ōpōtiki District covers 3,089.70 km^{2} (1,192.94 sq mi) and had an estimated population of 10,300 as of June 2025, with a population density of 3.3 people per km^{2}.

Historical population
Year	Pop.	±% p.a.
2006	8,973	—
2013	8,436	−0.88%
2018	9,276	+1.92%
2023	10,089	+1.69%

Ōpōtiki District had a population of 10,089 in the 2023 New Zealand census, an increase of 813 people (8.8%) since the 2018 census, and an increase of 1,653 people (19.6%) since the 2013 census. There were 5,004 males, 5,061 females and 24 people of other genders in 3,663 dwellings. 2.1% of people identified as LGBTIQ+. The median age was 40.1 years (compared with 38.1 years nationally). There were 2,163 people (21.4%) aged under 15 years, 1,782 (17.7%) aged 15 to 29, 4,134 (41.0%) aged 30 to 64, and 2,010 (19.9%) aged 65 or older.

People could identify as more than one ethnicity. The results were 49.7% European (Pākehā); 66.2% Māori; 4.5% Pasifika; 3.2% Asian; 0.4% Middle Eastern, Latin American and African New Zealanders (MELAA); and 1.6% other, which includes people giving their ethnicity as "New Zealander". English was spoken by 96.2%, Māori language by 23.0%, Samoan by 0.4% and other languages by 3.7%. No language could be spoken by 2.1% (e.g. too young to talk). New Zealand Sign Language was known by 0.7%. The percentage of people born overseas was 8.7, compared with 28.8% nationally.

Religious affiliations were 27.9% Christian, 0.4% Hindu, 0.2% Islam, 15.4% Māori religious beliefs, 0.3% Buddhist, 0.3% New Age, and 1.4% other religions. People who answered that they had no religion were 47.4%, and 7.7% of people did not answer the census question.

Of those at least 15 years old, 762 (9.6%) people had a bachelor's or higher degree, 4,479 (56.5%) had a post-high school certificate or diploma, and 2,493 (31.5%) people exclusively held high school qualifications. The median income was $30,500, compared with $41,500 nationally. 366 people (4.6%) earned over $100,000 compared to 12.1% nationally. The employment status of those at least 15 was that 3,411 (43.0%) people were employed full-time, 951 (12.0%) were part-time, and 489 (6.2%) were unemployed.

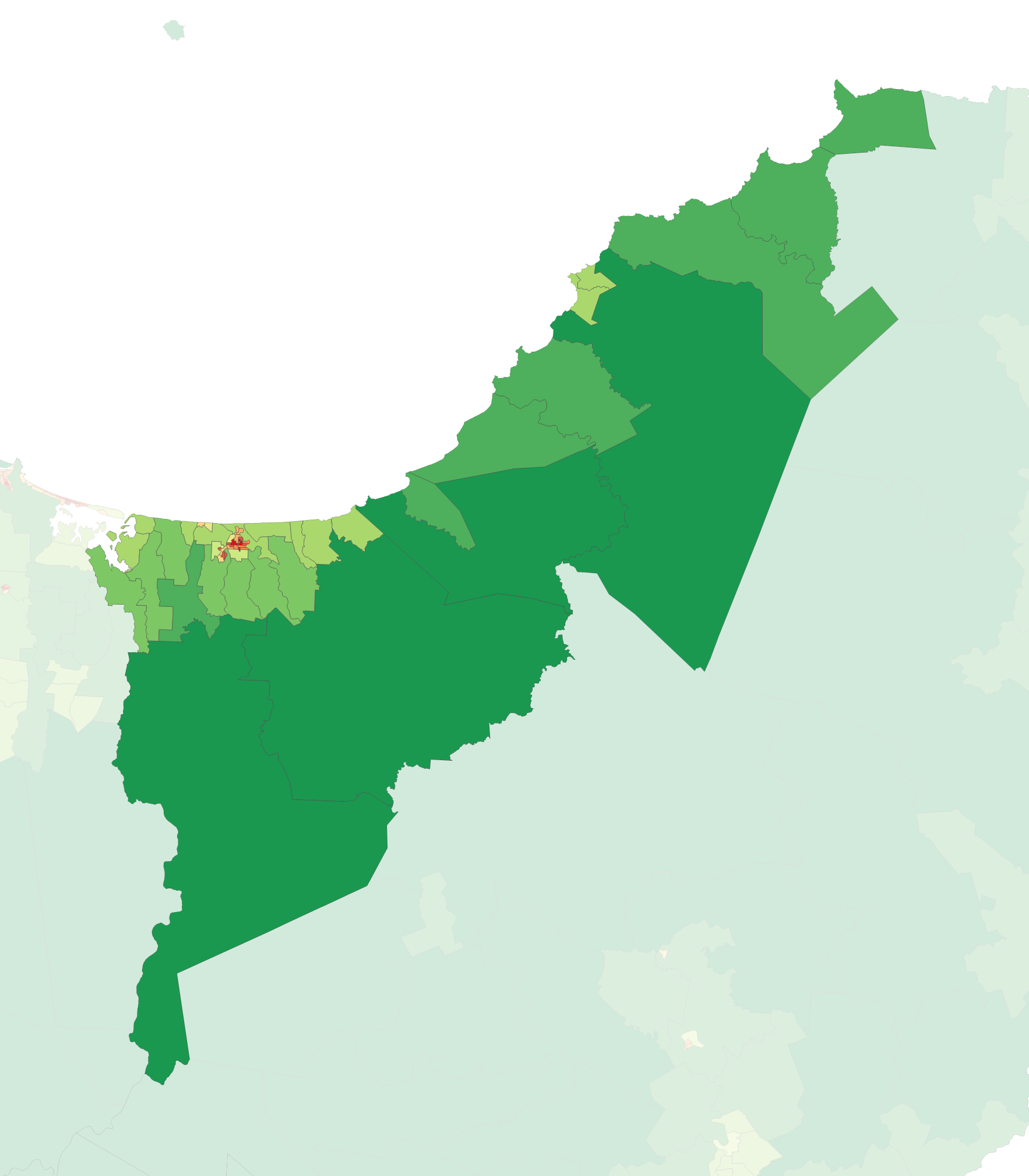
Population density in the 2023 census

Individual wards
Name	Area (km^{2})	Population	Density (per km^{2})	Dwellings	Median age	Median income
Coast Ward	1,568.88	1,881	1.2	717	44.2 years	$26,400
Waioeka-Waiōtahe-Otara Ward	1,506.97	3,354	2.2	1,332	46.3 years	$33,000
Ōpōtiki Ward	13.85	4,854	350.5	1,617	35.3 years	$31,300
New Zealand					38.1 years	$41,500
