= Ōpōtiki District Council =

Ōpōtiki District Council Te Kaunihera o Ōpōtiki

Type
- Term limits: None
- Established: 1 November 1989 (as currently constituted)

Leadership
- Mayor: David Moore
- Deputy mayor: Maude Maxwell

Structure
- Seats: 7 seats (1 mayor, 6 ward seats)
- Length of term: 3 years

Website
- odc.govt.nz

Ōpōtiki District Council or Opotiki District Council (Māori: Te Kaunihera o Ōpōtiki) is the territorial authority for the Ōpōtiki District of New Zealand.

The council is led by the mayor of Ōpōtiki, who is currently David Moore. There are also six ward councillors.

The Opotiki County Council changed its name to Opotiki District Council on 2 October 1986. It was reconstituted on 1 November 1989 as part of nationwide local government reforms.
