= Bay of Plenty Region =

Bay of Plenty
- Region
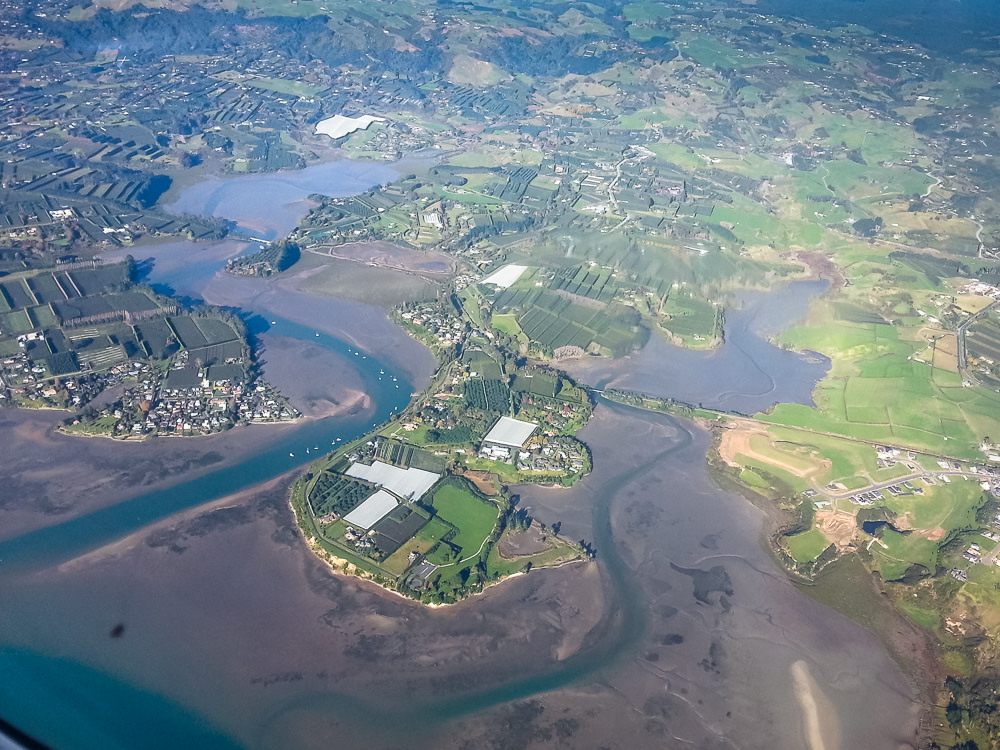
- Horticultural, farming and residential land in the Ōmokoroa area near Tauranga

- The Bay of Plenty within New Zealand
- Coordinates: 38°S 177°E
- Country: New Zealand
- Island: North Island
- Seat: Whakatāne

Government
  - Body: Bay of Plenty Regional Council
  - Chair: Matemoana McDonald
  - Deputy Chair: Glenn Dougal

Area
  - Total: 12,231 km^{2} (4,722 sq mi)
  - Land: 12,072.00 km^{2} (4,661.03 sq mi)

Population (June 2025)
  - Total: 351,500
  - Density: 29.12/km^{2} (75.41/sq mi)

GDP
  - Total: NZ$21.666 billion (2021) (5th)
  - Per capita: NZ$62,673 (2021)
- Time zone: UTC+12 (NZST)
  - Summer (DST): UTC+13 (NZDT)
- ISO 3166 code: NZ-BOP
- HDI (2023): 0.930 very high · 9th
- Website: www.boprc.govt.nz

The Bay of Plenty Region is a local government region in the North Island of New Zealand. Also called just the Bay of Plenty (BOP), it is situated around the marine bight of that same name. The bay was named by James Cook after he noticed the abundant food supplies at several Māori villages there, in stark contrast to what he observed in Poverty Bay.

The Bay of Plenty had an estimated resident population of 354,100 in June 2025, and is the fifth-most populous region in New Zealand. It also has the third-highest regional population density in New Zealand, with only the 11th-largest land area. The major population centres are Tauranga, Rotorua and Whakatāne. The Bay of Plenty is one of the fastest growing regions in New Zealand: the regional population increased by 7.5% between 2001 and 2006, with significant growth in the coastal and western parts, and grew by 8.3% between 2018 and 2023. It has the second-largest Māori population in New Zealand, with over 30% of its population being of Māori descent, and the second-highest number of Māori speakers in the country. It also has the largest number of iwi of any region. There are 35 local iwi, 260 hapū and 224 marae, with the most significant iwi being Te Arawa, Ngāi Tūhoe, Ngāti Awa and Te Whakatōhea.

Significant horticultural, forestry and tourism industries are well established in the region. However, the Bay of Plenty is the third-most economically deprived region in New Zealand, with the eastern districts being among the least economically developed in the country.

== History ==
The Bay of Plenty region as a local government area was formed in the nationwide 1989 local government reforms. The new region incorporated the former counties of Tauranga, Rotorua, Whakātane and Ōpōtiki, and the towns of the same names.

== Governance ==
Bay of Plenty Regional Council oversees regional land use, environmental management and civil defence.

The region wholly includes the territorial authority areas of Western Bay of Plenty District, Tauranga City, Whakatāne District, Kawerau District, and Ōpōtiki District, and parts of Rotorua Lakes District and the town of Rangitaiki in Taupō District.

Public health in New Zealand is broken into regions. The Bay of Plenty and Lakes district health boards have public health provided by Toi Te Ora – Public Health.

== Geography ==
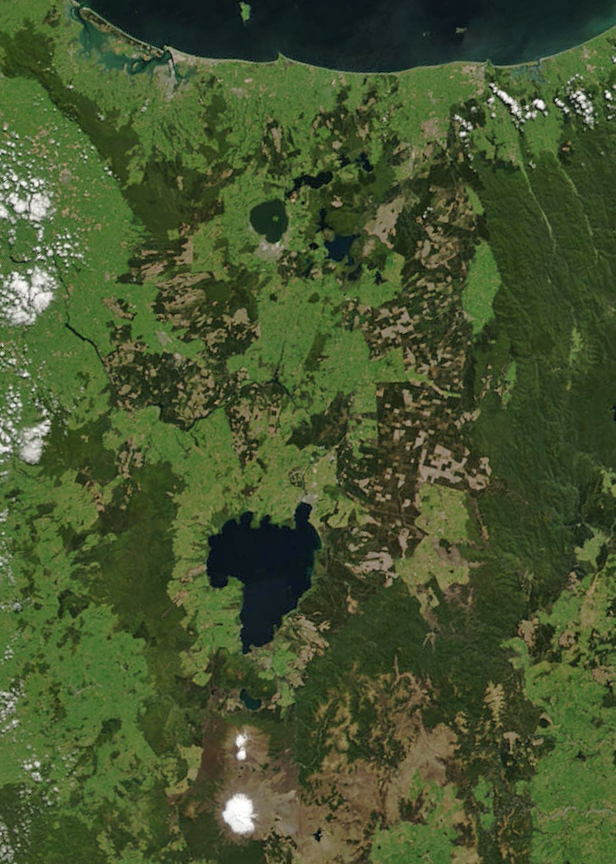
Satellite photo of the Bay of Plenty (top half of image)

The Bay of Plenty region covers 12,200 km^{2} (4,700 sq mi) of land and 9,500 km^{2} (3,700 sq mi) of coastal marine area. It extends along the eastern coast of the North Island, from the base of the Coromandel Peninsula in the west to Cape Runaway in the east. The region extends 12 nautical miles from the mainland coastline, and also extends from the coastlines of several islands in the bay, notably Mayor Island/Tuhua, Mōtītī Island, Whale Island and the active volcano of Whakaari/White Island. It extends inland to the sparsely populated forest lands around Rotorua and Murupara.

The region has more than 200 square kilometres (77 sq mi) of lakes, known as the Lakes of Rotorua.

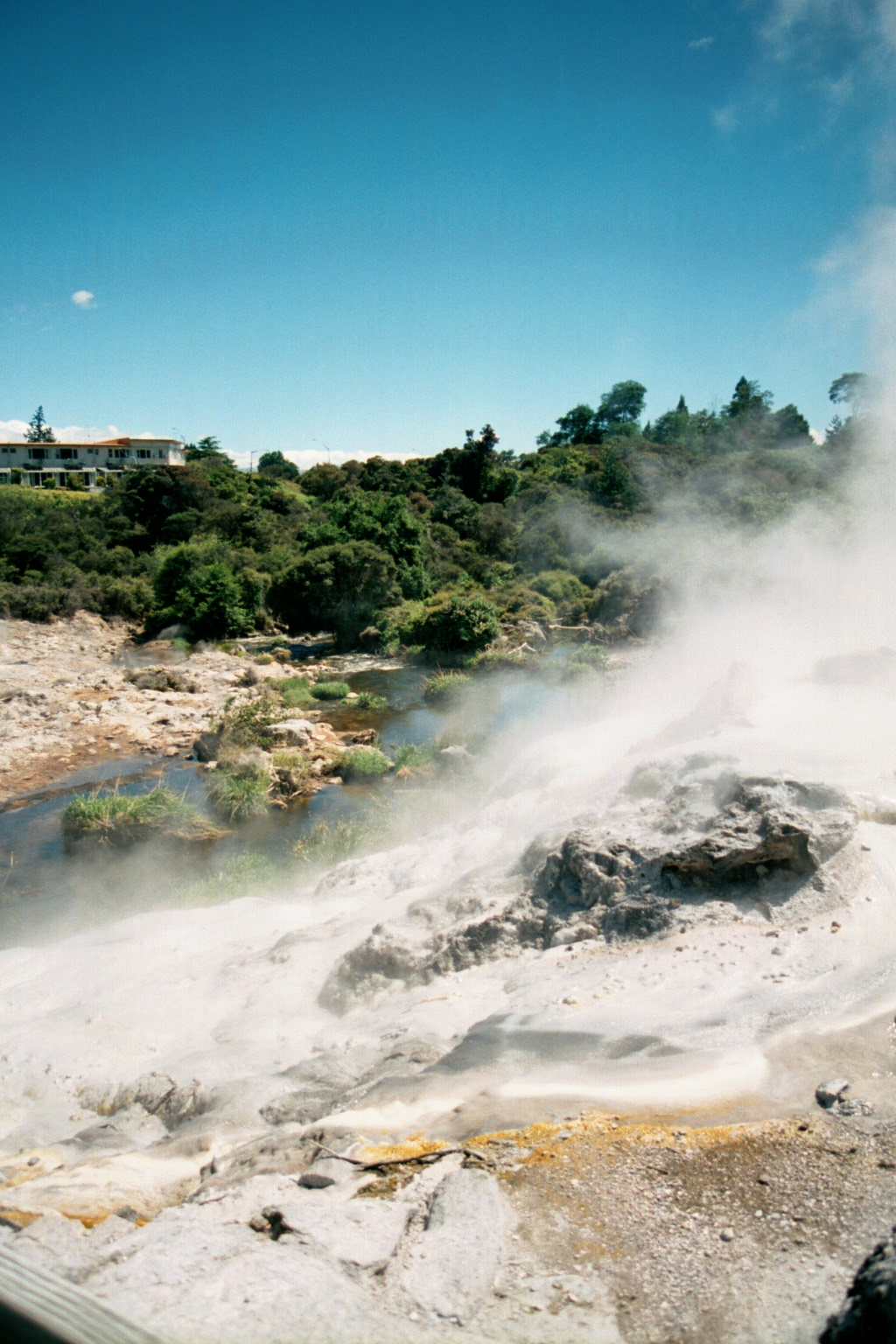
Geothermal activity at Whakarewarewa

Much of the central part of the region lies within the Taupō Volcanic Zone, which extends from the centre of the North Island northwards to Whakaari/White Island. Volcanic mountains and lakes, geothermal areas and geological fault lines all dot the landscape. The geothermal region around Rotorua is a major tourist site, while many hot springs in the region are used as swimming areas. The geothermal field near Kawerau is the site of a geothermal power plant that will reportedly meet up to one third of residential and industrial electricity demand in the Eastern Bay of Plenty. Whakaari/White Island, the site of a former sulfur-mining operation, is an active volcanic island popular with tourists. The eruption of Mount Tarawera in 1886 and the 1987 Edgecumbe earthquake were two disasters related to geological activity in the volcanic plateau.

Prominent volcanic cones in the region include Mount Maunganui, Mount Tarawera and Mount Edgecumbe/Putauaki. These features also have cultural significance to local Māori. The Kaimai and Mamaku mountain ranges lie at the western border of the region. Swamp land was formerly concentrated around a number of rivers, but much of this was dredged in the early part of the 20th century to increase land for settlement and other uses. Large native and foreign (planted) forest areas are found in the inland parts of the region. The Kaingaroa Forest is the world's largest planted forest, comprising radiata pine mainly used for timber.

=== Climate ===
The Bay of Plenty region has warm, humid summers and mild winters. It is one of the warmest regions in New Zealand, particularly along the coastline, and most areas experience at least 2,200 hours of sunshine per annum. Average daily maximum temperatures range from 10 to 16 °C (50 to 61 °F) in winter and 22 to 26 °C (72 to 79 °F) in summer. Typical minima vary from 0 to 9 °C (32 to 48 °F) in winter and 11 to 17 °C (52 to 63 °F) during summer. Rainfall occurs more frequently in winter than in summer, but tropical storms in summer and autumn can produce heavy rain with high winds. Central parts of the region can receive up to 2,000 millimetres (79 in) of rainfall annually, while the eastern and western areas can receive up to 4,000 millimetres (160 in).

== Demographics ==
Bay of Plenty region covers 12,071.55 km^{2} (4,660.85 sq mi) and had an estimated population of 351,500 as of June 2025, with a population density of 29 people per km^{2}.

Historical population
Year	Pop.	±% p.a.
1991	203,982	—
1996	224,364	+1.92%
2001	239,415	+1.31%
2006	257,379	+1.46%
2013	267,741	+0.57%
2018	308,499	+2.87%
2023	334,140	+1.61%

Bay of Plenty region had a population of 334,140 in the 2023 New Zealand census, an increase of 25,641 people (8.3%) since the 2018 census, and an increase of 66,399 people (24.8%) since the 2013 census. There were 163,203 males, 170,004 females and 939 people of other genders in 120,057 dwellings. 2.3% of people identified as LGBTIQ+. The median age was 39.7 years (compared with 38.1 years nationally). There were 66,453 people (19.9%) aged under 15 years, 57,576 (17.2%) aged 15 to 29, 145,197 (43.5%) aged 30 to 64, and 64,911 (19.4%) aged 65 or older.

People could identify as more than one ethnicity. The results were 71.9% European (Pākehā); 30.6% Māori; 4.3% Pasifika; 8.8% Asian; 1.2% Middle Eastern, Latin American and African New Zealanders (MELAA); and 2.1% other, which includes people giving their ethnicity as "New Zealander". English was spoken by 96.2%, Māori language by 9.0%, Samoan by 0.4% and other languages by 10.3%. No language could be spoken by 2.1% (e.g. too young to talk). New Zealand Sign Language was known by 0.4%. The percentage of people born overseas was 20.6, compared with 28.8% nationally.

Religious affiliations were 30.4% Christian, 1.3% Hindu, 0.3% Islam, 3.7% Māori religious beliefs, 0.6% Buddhist, 0.4% New Age, 0.1% Jewish, and 2.7% other religions. People who answered that they had no religion were 53.4%, and 7.4% of people did not answer the census question.

Of those at least 15 years old, 42,465 (15.9%) people had a bachelor's or higher degree, 145,284 (54.3%) had a post-high school certificate or diploma, and 66,879 (25.0%) people exclusively held high school qualifications. The median income was $39,000, compared with $41,500 nationally. 26,280 people (9.8%) earned over $100,000 compared to 12.1% nationally. The employment status of those at least 15 was that 129,156 (48.2%) people were employed full-time, 37,209 (13.9%) were part-time, and 9,216 (3.4%) were unemployed.

The region has smaller populations of Pasifika and Asians than other regions.

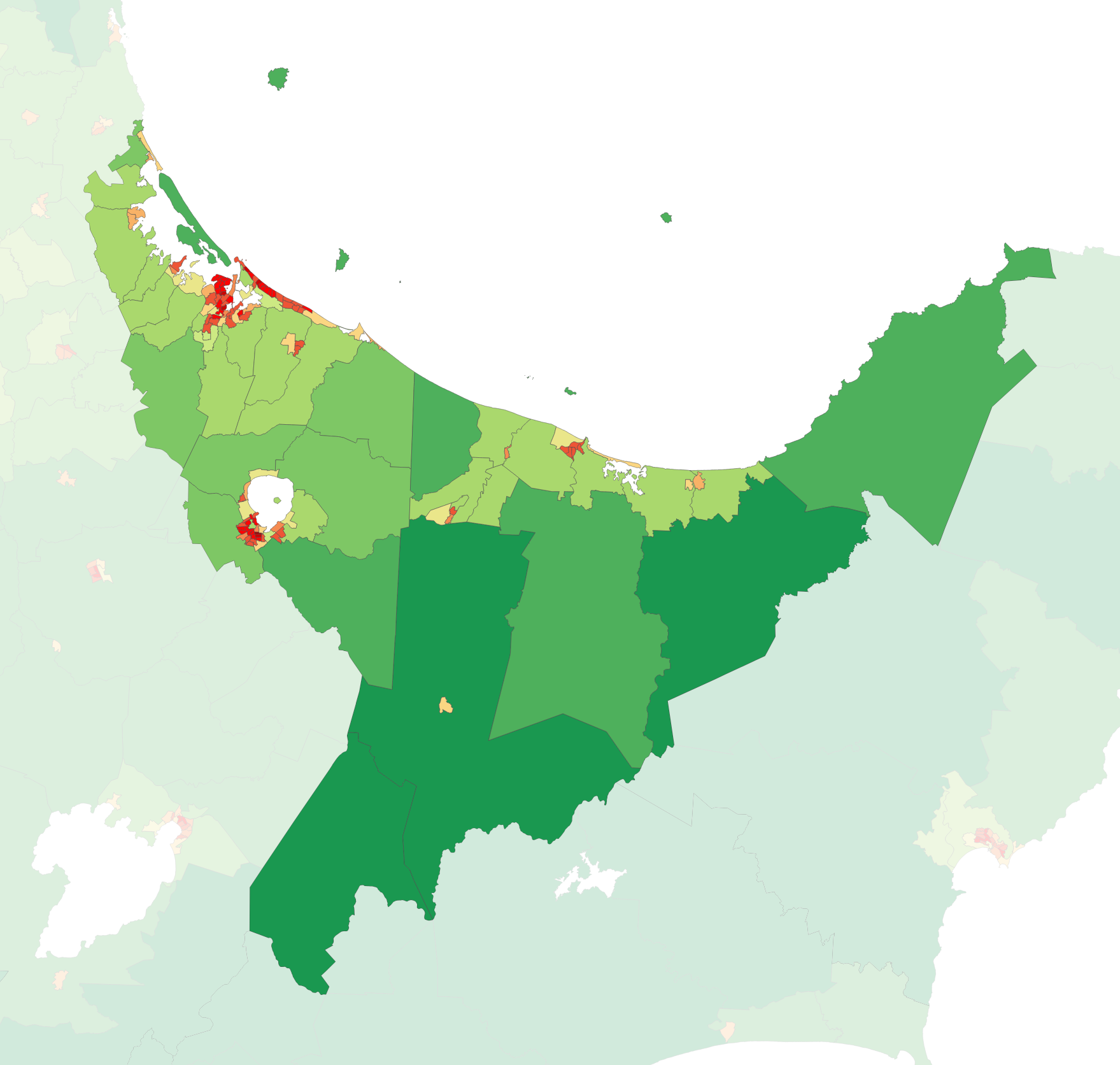
Population density map of the Bay of Plenty at the 2023 Census. Red = High, Green = Low.

The Bay of Plenty is the fifth-most populous region in New Zealand, accounting for 6.6% of the national population.

The coast is dotted with several sizeable settlements, the largest of which is the conurbation of the city of Tauranga and its neighbour Mount Maunganui in the west. The town of Whakatāne is located in the centre of the coast. Other towns of note include Waihi Beach, Katikati, Maketu, Pukehina Beach and Ōpōtiki.

Most of the population along the coast is concentrated in the western and central parts of the shore; the eastern part is sparsely populated hill country. The region has the third-highest regional population density in New Zealand, with only the 11th-largest land area. The major population centres are Tauranga, Rotorua and Whakatāne.

Significant horticultural, forestry and tourism industries are well established in the region. However, the Bay of Plenty is the third-most economically deprived region in New Zealand, with the eastern districts being among the least economically developed in the country.

Largest groups of overseas-born residents
Nationality	Population (2018)
England	14,817
India	6,393
Australia	5,562
South Africa	4,299
Philippines	2,703
China	1,848
Scotland	1,770
Netherlands	1,563
United States of America	1,479
South Korea	1,434

=== Urban areas ===
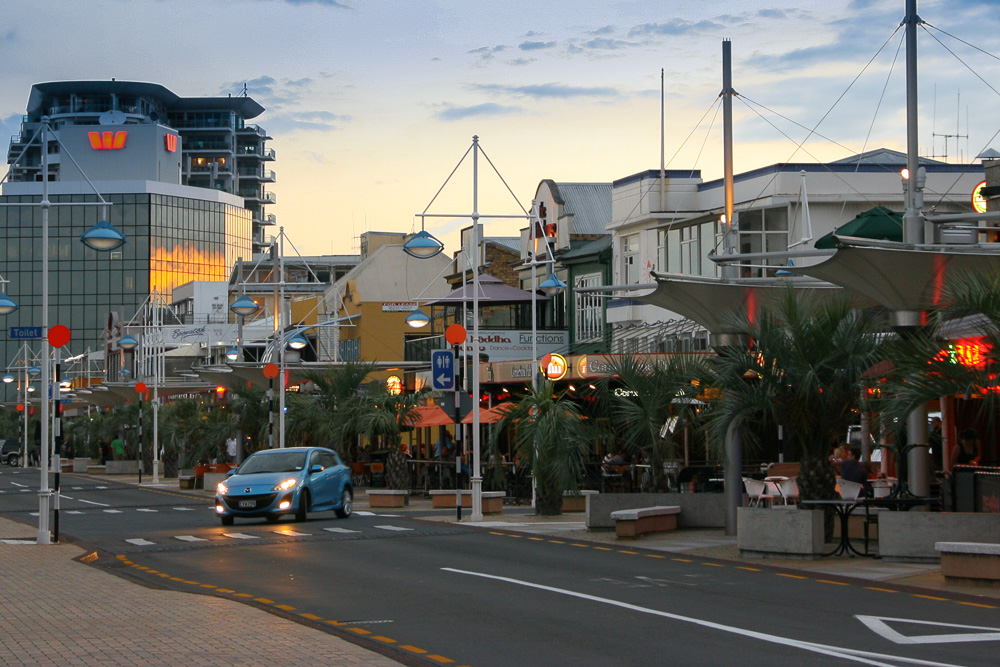
Tauranga, most populous city in the region

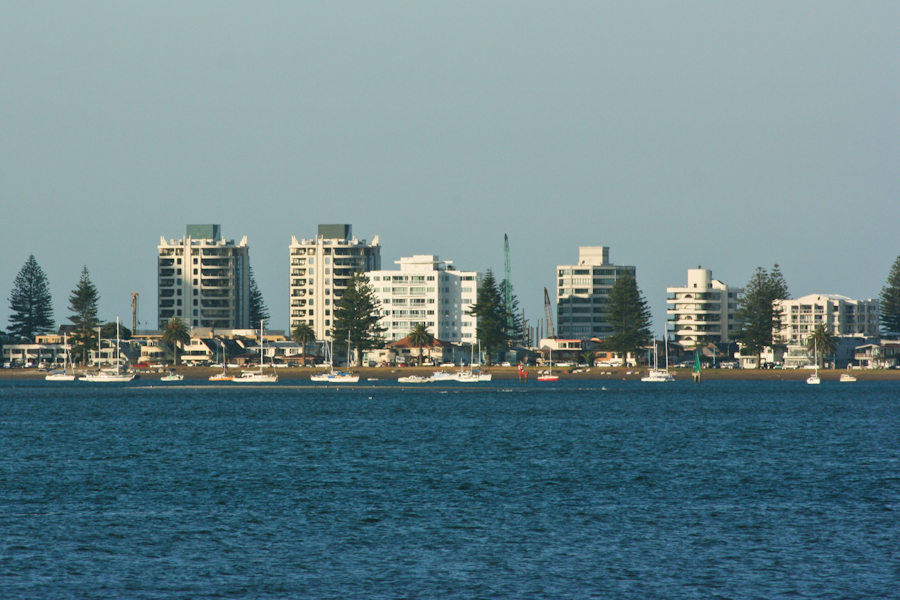
High rise buildings in Mount Maunganui, suburb of Tauranga

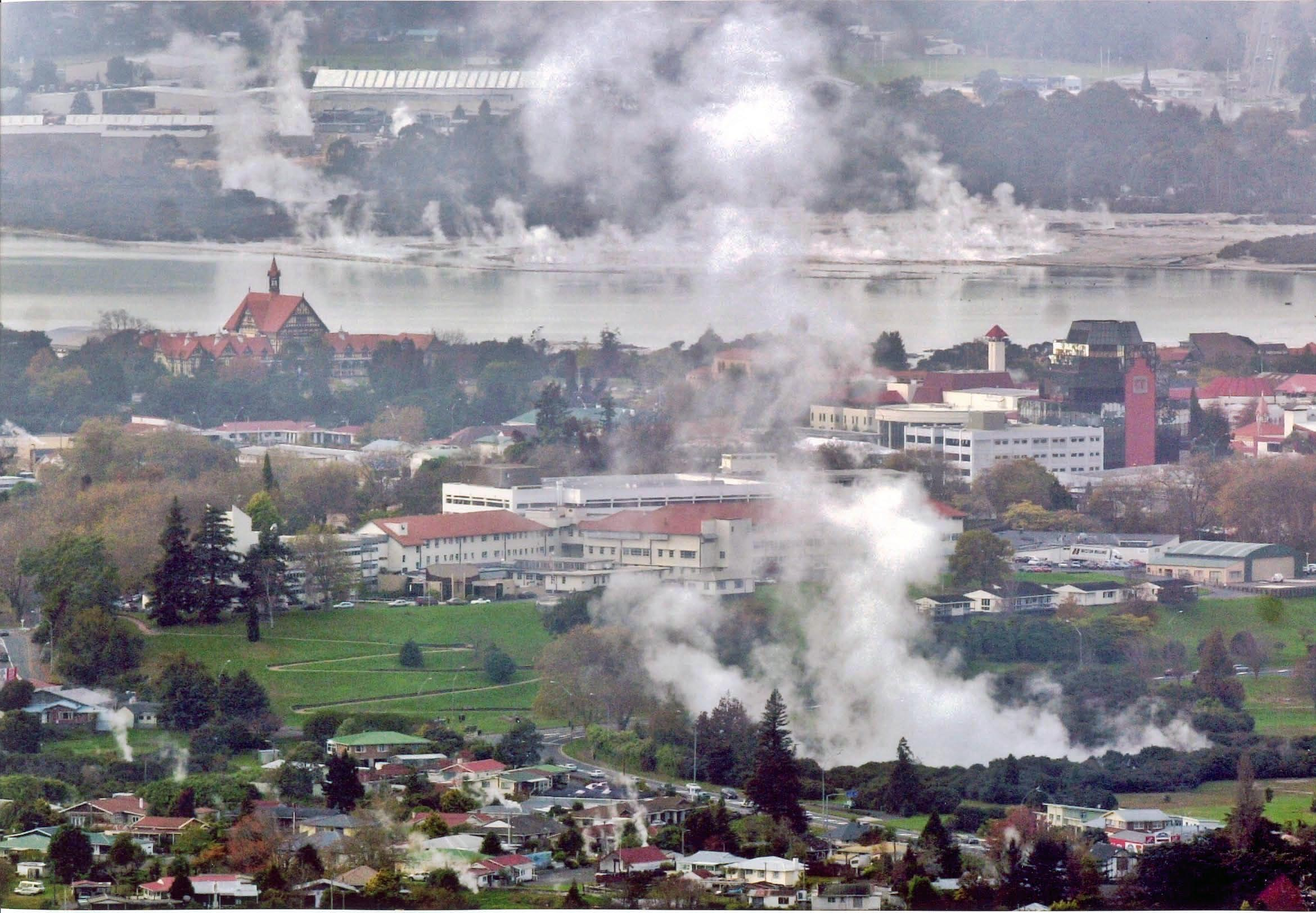
Rotorua, second most populous city in the region

Urban areas in Bay of Plenty (pop. >1000)
Name	Population (June 2025)	% of region
Tauranga	160,900	45.8%
Rotorua	58,500	16.6%
Whakatāne	16,950	4.8%
Te Puke	10,400	3.0%
Kawerau	7,680	2.2%
Katikati	6,030	1.7%
Ōmokoroa	5,800	1.7%
Ōpōtiki	4,900	1.4%
Ngongotahā	5,280	1.5%
Ōhope	3,070	0.9%
Waihi Beach	2,620	0.7%
Murupara	1,910	0.5%
Edgecumbe	1,890	0.5%

== Economy ==
The subnational gross domestic product (GDP) of Bay of Plenty was estimated at NZ$17.24 billion in the year to March 2019, 5.7% of New Zealand's national GDP. The subnational GDP per capita was estimated at $53,700 in the same period. In the year to March 2018, primary industries contributed $1.89 billion (11.6%) to the regional GDP, goods-producing industries contributed $3.24 billion (20.0%), service industries contributed $9.72 billion (59.8%), and taxes and duties contributed $1.39 billion (8.6%).

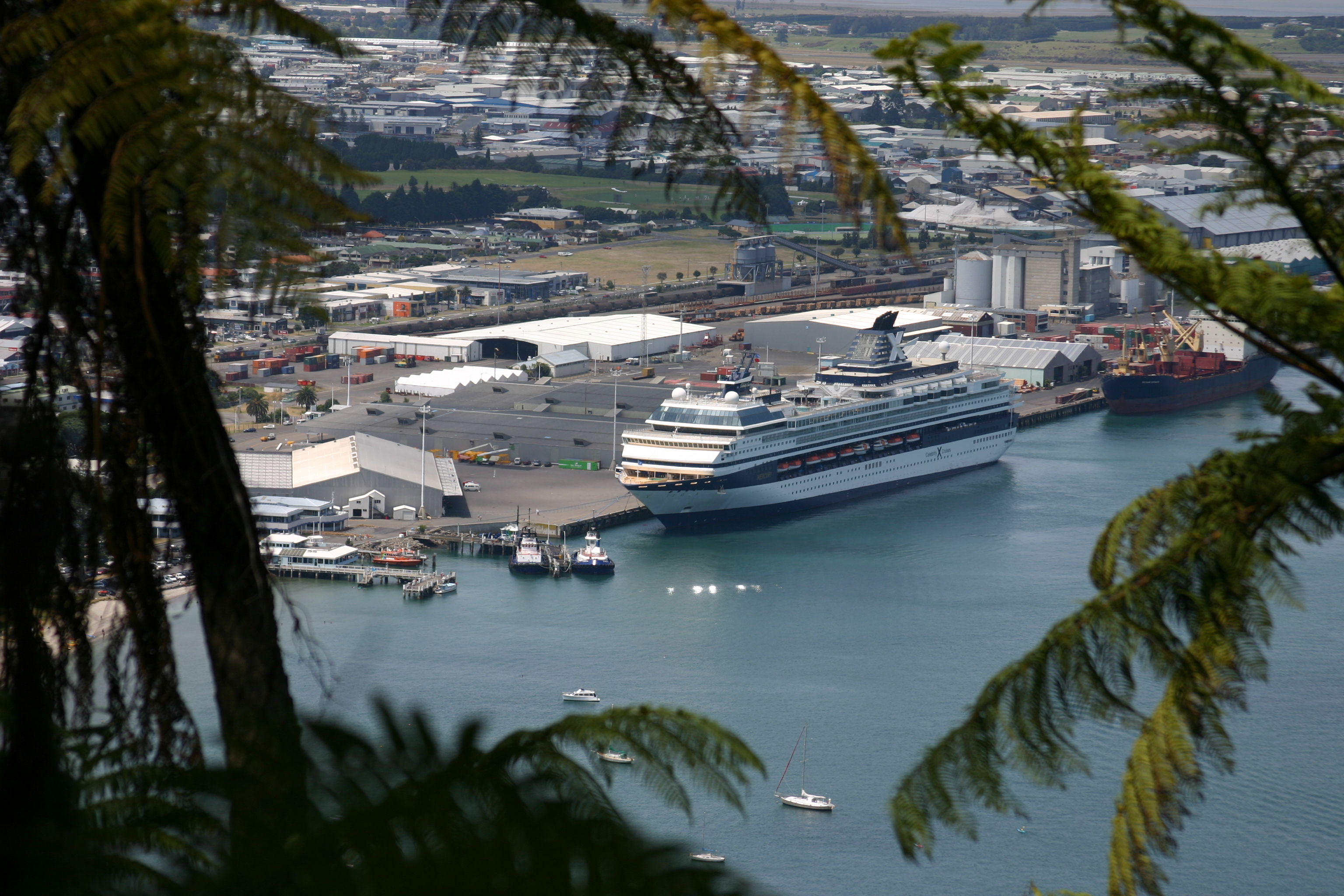
The Port of Tauranga is the largest port in the country by cargo volume.

Agriculture, natural resources and tourism are the major industries. Most (96 per cent) of the region is defined as 'rural', with 22% of land usage representing farm land and 38% representing nature reserve land. The most common agricultural land uses are horticulture, dairy, grazing and sheep farming. The region has over 11,500 hectares of horticultural land, predominantly producing kiwifruit and avocadoes. The region also has an abundance of coastal, forestry and geothermal resources. Forestry emerged as a vital industry in the 1950s, with radiata pine being planted during the early 20th century. Forestry is commercially planted and managed, mostly using planted foreign tree species, and timber is sent to the Port of Tauranga for export. Geothermal activity is a source of tourism, and geothermal energy is emerging as a major regional source of electricity. Tourism is the other notable industry, accounting for 15% of the region's GDP from March 2000 to 2004.

Overall economic growth in the Bay of Plenty averaged 2.1% between March 2000 and 2004, compared with the national rate of 3.5%, although per capita real GDP growth in the five years to March 2003 matched the national growth rate at an averaged 2.3%. In the 2013 Census, the median annual income was $26,200, below the national median of $28,500. Further, 39.3% of people aged 15 years or older earned an annual income of less than $20,000, compared with 38.2% of people nationally. Unemployment was at 9.0% of people 15 years or older, compared with 7.1% nationally.

== Tourism ==
The Bay of Plenty region is a popular holiday destination due to the warm and sunny summer climate and public beaches. The region received over 645,000 tourists in 2003, equivalent to one in three visitors to New Zealand coming to the region. Rotorua is a popular destination for international visitors, in particular the surrounding geothermal areas and Māori cultural centres. Tauranga is a popular domestic tourism destination, and also becoming popular internationally. Whale watching has become a popular attraction as the number of whales such as blue whales and humpback whales migrating into bay waters began to recover.

== Transport ==
The Bay of Plenty region has 227 kilometres (141 mi) of rail network and 4,460 kilometres (2,770 mi) of roads. The main rail line is the East Coast Main Trunk Railway, which extends from Hamilton in the Waikato region to Kawerau via Tauranga, with the Murupara Branch Railway extending the Kawerau terminus to Murupara, and the Mount Maunganui Branch connecting the Mount Maunganui terminus with the East Coast Main Trunk. The rail network is used exclusively for freight. The hub of regional economic activity is the Port of Tauranga, with well-established rail and road connections to other parts of the region. The three commercial airports are Tauranga Airport, Rotorua Airport and Whakatāne Airport.

Car travel remains the dominant form of transport in the region. In 2002, the number of vehicles owned in the region was 189,000, with an average of 1.51 vehicles per household. There are public transport bus services in Tauranga and Rotorua only. Significant growth in the Western Bay of Plenty District has seen increased strain on road infrastructure, particularly with increasing traffic congestion in Tauranga. A new highway network is being planned and constructed in Tauranga to join with its current network spanning on the western side of the city. The NZ Transport Agency, in conjunction with Environment Bay of Plenty, Tauranga City and the Western Bay of Plenty District Councils, is planning to build an Eastern Motorway bypassing Te Puke, a Western Motorway bypassing Ōmokoroa and a smaller Southern Motorway.

== Sport ==
The Bay of Plenty is represented in several domestic sporting competitions. The Bay of Plenty Rugby Union oversees the Bay of Plenty Steamers, who play in the Mitre10 Cup. The Steamers are also a feeder club for the Chiefs who play in the Super Rugby competition. The Waikato/Bay of Plenty Magic compete in the ANZ Championship in netball, having previously played in the National Bank Cup. Bay of Plenty also makes up a part of the Northern Districts cricket region and the Midlands hockey region.

== Media ==
=== Magazines ===
- LaVita Magazine
- Plenty Magazine
- UNO. Magazine
- Focus magazine

=== Newspapers ===
- Weekend Sun/SunLive
- Bay of Plenty Times
- Rotorua Daily Post
- Te Puke Times
- Opotiki News
- Whakatane Beacon

=== Radio stations ===
- The Hits Rotorua
- The Hits Bay of Plenty
- 89.4 ZM – Hits
- 90.2 Newstalk ZB – Talk
- 90.5 1XX – Adult Contemporary
- 91.0 Radio Hauraki – Classic Rock
- 91.4 Radio New Zealand Concert – Classical
- 92.6 The Sound – Classic Rock
- 92.9 1XX – Adult Contemporary
- 93.4 More FM – Hits
- 93.7 Bayrock – Rock
- 97.7 and 99.3 Q97 – Hits
- 94.2 The Rock FM – Rock
- 95.0 Classic Hits – 80s / 90s
- 95.8 Breeze Tauranga – Hits
- 97.4 Coast – Easy Listening
- 99.0 Radio Sport – Sports
- 99.8 The Edge – Hits
- 100.1 Bayrock – Rock
- 101.0 Radio New Zealand National – Talk
- 105.4 BollyBOP FM – Hits

=== Television ===
- TV Central (Freeview Channel 30) – Bay of Plenty & Waikato (shut down in April 2015)
- TV Rotorua-Rotorua (shut down in December 2013)
- Geyser Television-Rotorua (shut down in December 2013)

== Notable people ==
- Te Purewa (?–1842?), tribal leader, war leader and peacemaker
- Maharaia Winiata (1912–1960), a New Zealand tribal leader, Methodist minister, teacher, anthropologist, broadcaster and community leader

== Sister provinces ==
- Jiangxi Province, China

== See also ==
- List of schools in the Bay of Plenty region
