= Mayor of Ōpōtiki =

- Incumbent; David Moore since 2022
- Style: His/Her Worship
- Term length: Three years, renewable
- Inaugural holder: Don Riesterer
- Formation: 1989
- Deputy: Maude Maxwell
- Salary: $114,200
- Website: Official website

The mayor of Ōpōtiki officiates over the Ōpōtiki District of New Zealand which is administered by the Ōpōtiki District Council (ODC). The ODC was formed by the amalgamation of the Opotiki County Council and the Opotiki Borough Council, as part of the local government reforms in 1989. The current mayor of Ōpōtiki is David Moore.

Don Riesterer (died February 2019), who was mayor from 1989 to 2001, was the father of Lyn Riesterer, who became mayor in October 2019 and served for one term.

== List of mayors ==
Mayors of Ōpōtiki District have been:

	Name	Portrait	Term of office
1	Don Riesterer QSO JP		1989–2001
2	John Forbes		2001–2019
3	Lyn Riesterer		2019–2022
4	David Moore		2022–present

== List of deputy mayors ==
Name	Term	Mayor
Selby Fisher	c. 2004–2010	Forbes
Haki McRoberts	2010–2016	Forbes
Lyn Riesterer	2016–2019	Forbes
Shona Browne	2019–2025	Riesterer
Maude Maxwell	2025–present	Moore
