= Galatea, New Zealand =

Locality in Bay of Plenty Region, New Zealand

Galatea Kuhawaea (Māori)
- Locality
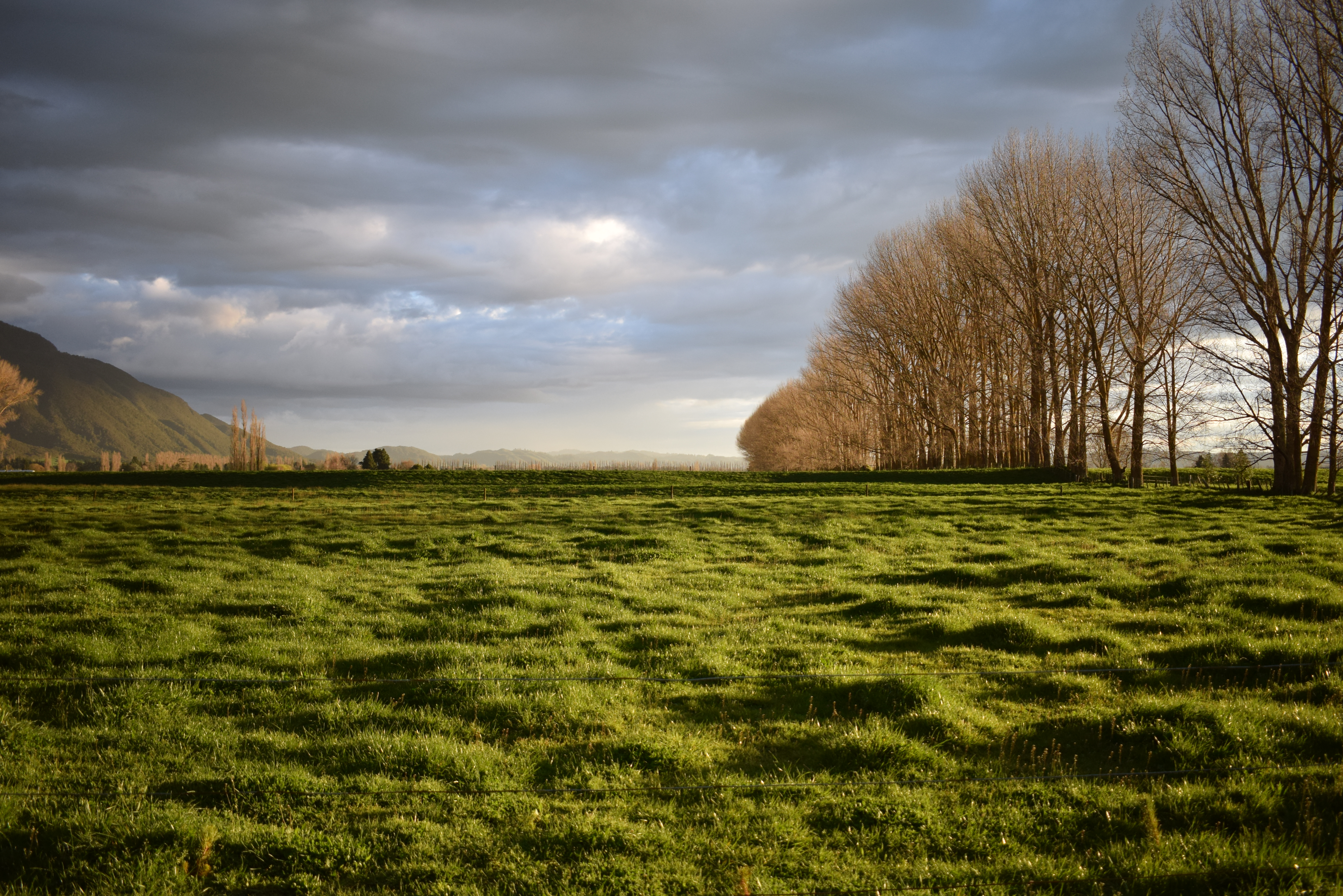
- Galatea, looking southwest along the Ikawhenua range
- Interactive map of Galatea
- Coordinates: 38.4117°S 176.7400°E
- Country: New Zealand
- Region: Bay of Plenty
- Territorial authority: Whakatāne District
- Ward: Te Urewera General Ward
- Community: Murupara Community
- Electorates: East Cape; Waiariki (Māori)

Government
  - Territorial authority: Whakatāne District Council
  - Regional council: Bay of Plenty Regional Council
  - Mayor of Whakatāne: Nándor Tánczos
  - East Cape MP: Dana Kirkpatrick
  - Waiariki MP: Rawiri Waititi

Area
  - Total: 102.65 km^{2} (39.63 sq mi)

Population (2023 Census)
  - Total: 465
  - Density: 4.53/km^{2} (11.7/sq mi)

Galatea (Māori: Kuhawaea) is a settlement in the Whakatāne District in the Bay of Plenty region of the North Island of New Zealand.

The forested hills and mountains of the Ikawhenua Range and in particular Mount Tāwhiuau stand guard on the eastern flank of the Galatea Plains or Basin, an area surrounding the village. To the west, and over the Rangitaiki River stretch the 120,000 acres (490 km^{2}) of the Kaingaroa Forest.

== Demographics ==
Galatea locality covers 102.65 km^{2} (39.63 sq mi). It is part of the Galatea statistical area.

Historical population for Galatea locality
Year	Pop.	±% p.a.
2006	438	—
2013	438	+0.00%
2018	444	+0.27%
2023	465	+0.93%

The locality had a population of 465 in the 2023 New Zealand census, an increase of 21 people (4.7%) since the 2018 census, and an increase of 27 people (6.2%) since the 2013 census. There were 246 males, 216 females, and 3 people of other genders in 162 dwellings. 1.9% of people identified as LGBTIQ+. There were 111 people (23.9%) aged under 15 years, 90 (19.4%) aged 15 to 29, 198 (42.6%) aged 30 to 64, and 63 (13.5%) aged 65 or older.

People could identify as more than one ethnicity. The results were 73.5% European (Pākehā); 36.8% Māori; 2.6% Pasifika; 4.5% Asian; 0.6% Middle Eastern, Latin American and African New Zealanders (MELAA); and 2.6% other, which includes people giving their ethnicity as "New Zealander". English was spoken by 95.5%, Māori by 8.4%, Samoan by 0.6%, and other languages by 7.1%. No language could be spoken by 3.2% (e.g. too young to talk). The percentage of people born overseas was 11.0, compared with 28.8% nationally.

Religious affiliations were 29.7% Christian, 1.9% Māori religious beliefs, and 1.3% other religions. People who answered that they had no religion were 60.6%, and 8.4% of people did not answer the census question.

Of those at least 15 years old, 30 (8.5%) people had a bachelor's or higher degree, 219 (61.9%) had a post-high school certificate or diploma, and 93 (26.3%) people exclusively held high school qualifications. 33 people (9.3%) earned over $100,000 compared to 12.1% nationally. The employment status of those at least 15 was 207 (58.5%) full-time, 51 (14.4%) part-time, and 15 (4.2%) unemployed.

=== Galatea statistical area ===
Galatea statistical area includes Minginui, and surrounds but does not include Murupara. It covers 2,199.70 km^{2} (849.31 sq mi) and had an estimated population of 1,620 as of June 2025, with a population density of 0.74 people per km^{2}.

Historical population for the statistical area
Year	Pop.	±% p.a.
2006	1,431	—
2013	1,320	−1.15%
2018	1,407	+1.28%
2023	1,572	+2.24%

The statistical area had a population of 1,572 in the 2023 New Zealand census, an increase of 165 people (11.7%) since the 2018 census, and an increase of 252 people (19.1%) since the 2013 census. There were 825 males and 747 females in 495 dwellings. 1.0% of people identified as LGBTIQ+. The median age was 34.3 years (compared with 38.1 years nationally). There were 363 people (23.1%) aged under 15 years, 321 (20.4%) aged 15 to 29, 678 (43.1%) aged 30 to 64, and 213 (13.5%) aged 65 or older.

People could identify as more than one ethnicity. The results were 46.4% European (Pākehā); 66.2% Māori; 4.0% Pasifika; 2.1% Asian; 0.2% Middle Eastern, Latin American and African New Zealanders (MELAA); and 1.1% other, which includes people giving their ethnicity as "New Zealander". English was spoken by 94.5%, Māori by 31.5%, Samoan by 0.4%, and other languages by 2.9%. No language could be spoken by 3.1% (e.g. too young to talk). New Zealand Sign Language was known by 0.2%. The percentage of people born overseas was 5.5, compared with 28.8% nationally.

Religious affiliations were 27.5% Christian, 0.2% Hindu, 16.2% Māori religious beliefs, 0.2% New Age, and 0.4% other religions. People who answered that they had no religion were 49.4%, and 7.8% of people did not answer the census question.

Of those at least 15 years old, 138 (11.4%) people had a bachelor's or higher degree, 666 (55.1%) had a post-high school certificate or diploma, and 405 (33.5%) people exclusively held high school qualifications. The median income was $30,200, compared with $41,500 nationally. 66 people (5.5%) earned over $100,000 compared to 12.1% nationally. The employment status of those at least 15 was 522 (43.2%) full-time, 165 (13.6%) part-time, and 93 (7.7%) unemployed.

== Geography ==
The southern boundary of the Galatea Plains is the Whirinaki River, which descends from Te Urewera and joins the Rangitāiki River below the township of Murupara. A few miles downstream on the western side of this trout-filled river, Fort Galatea was built, where from their lofty lookout the constables living there were able to survey the tracks used by the many Māori who passed by on their way from or to the coast near Whakatāne.

To the north the Ikawhenuas lower and gradually close in to reach the right hand bank of the Rangitāiki River, leaving only enough room for an access road from the valley over "Snake Hill" to the Rangitāiki Plains.

=== Climate ===
Climate data for Galatea (1991–2020)
Month	Jan	Feb	Mar	Apr	May	Jun	Jul	Aug	Sep	Oct	Nov	Dec	Year
Mean daily maximum °C (°F)	24.0 (75.2)	24.0 (75.2)	21.9 (71.4)	18.7 (65.7)	15.7 (60.3)	13.3 (55.9)	12.6 (54.7)	13.6 (56.5)	15.4 (59.7)	17.7 (63.9)	19.9 (67.8)	22.2 (72.0)	18.3 (64.9)
Daily mean °C (°F)	18.4 (65.1)	18.6 (65.5)	16.3 (61.3)	13.1 (55.6)	10.1 (50.2)	8.0 (46.4)	7.2 (45.0)	8.3 (46.9)	10.3 (50.5)	12.5 (54.5)	14.5 (58.1)	16.9 (62.4)	12.9 (55.1)
Mean daily minimum °C (°F)	12.8 (55.0)	13.2 (55.8)	10.6 (51.1)	7.5 (45.5)	4.5 (40.1)	2.6 (36.7)	1.8 (35.2)	3.0 (37.4)	5.2 (41.4)	7.2 (45.0)	9.0 (48.2)	11.9 (53.4)	7.4 (45.4)
Source: NIWA

== History ==
=== Pre-European history ===
The coastal area of the Bay of Plenty has been occupied by various tribes of Māori arriving in canoes from the islands of Polynesia. As more canoes arrived, the newcomers either fitted in with the peaceful residents or overcame them. They fished when the season was right, then moved inland to trap pigeons, gather fernroots, and catch eels. At these times they reached Waiōhau, Galatea, Murupara and Te Whāiti.

=== 19th century ===
When visits of European trading ships became more common, the Galatea Māori would travel down the river with goods to barter. Flax was their main commodity and axes, spades, hoes and later, guns and clothing were given in return. These people were Ngāti Manawa and their neighbours in the adjoining Urewera forested hills were the Ngāi Tūhoe, or "Children of the Mist", who often raided the Ngāti Manawa and on occasion drove them out of the area.

Pōmare, chief of the Ngāpuhi from Northland was in the habit of travelling south to fight with the Bay of Plenty tribes and after attacking all the pā on the plains, chased the Tūhoe back into the Urewera hills. He returned home with his canoes loaded with spoils and heads of the vanquished, only to return a year later The Ngāti Manawa were relieved to see the Ngāpuhi disappear up the Horomanga River to meet up with Pōmare's party who travelled up the Waimana River into the mountainous Urewera lands.

A principal chief of Tūhoe sent a messenger to Pōmare asking for a meeting at which the threat of war between the tribes ceased and this led to continuing peace between Ngāpuhi and Tūhoe.

The Pai Mārire religion started in Taranaki and was introduced to the Bay of Plenty in 1865 by two of its prophets who met the Tūhoe, Ngāti Manawa and Ngāti Whare tribes with the object of explaining the "new religion". Some accepted and were initiated around the head of Captain P.W.J. Lloyd who had been killed in Taranaki. In Ōpōtiki, the Rev. Carl Völkner, a much loved missionary was murdered by Hauhau, and later a half-caste interpreter, James Fulloon was murdered at Whakatāne. Open hostility to "pākehā" was shown over a wide area, and killings occurred on both sides.

This is where Fort Galatea came into use. HMS Galatea at that time was visiting the country under the command of Prince Alfred, Duke of Edinburgh. and it is from this ship that the name was derived. Soldiers were stationed at the Fort in readiness to march into the Urewera forests to fight the Hauhau, and with them a renegade by the name of Te Kooti who had been captured after a battle in the Poverty Bay area. He was transported as a prisoner to the Chatham Islands when he soon became the leader of the prisoners. During a riot, they escaped, seized a schooner and reached the mainland where they continued the war against the pākehā. Te Kooti was ruthless and in complete control of the Hauhau, even though he was not one of them, but was a prophet and leader of what was to become the Ringatū religion.

== Education ==
Galatea School is a co-educational state primary school for Year 1 to 8 students, with a roll of 123 as of July 2026. The school opened in 1935.
