= Whirinaki River =

Whirinaki River is the name of two rivers in New Zealand's North Island:

- Whirinaki River (Hawke's Bay)
- Whirinaki River (Northland)
