= Te Mahoe =

Rural settlement in Bay of Plenty Region, New Zealand

- Rural settlement
- Interactive map of Te Mahoe
- Coordinates: 38.109°S 176.816°E
- Country: New Zealand
- Region: Bay of Plenty
- Territorial authority: Whakatāne District
- Ward: Rangitāiki General Ward
- Community: Rangitāiki Community
- Electorates: East Cape; Waiariki (Māori)

Government
  - Territorial authority: Whakatāne District Council
  - Regional council: Bay of Plenty Regional Council
  - Mayor of Whakatāne: Nándor Tánczos
  - East Cape MP: Dana Kirkpatrick
  - Waiariki MP: Rawiri Waititi

Area
  - Total: 9.30 km^{2} (3.59 sq mi)

Population (2023 Census)
  - Total: 96
  - Density: 10/km^{2} (27/sq mi)

Te Mahoe is a rural settlement in the Whakatāne District and Bay of Plenty Region of New Zealand's North Island, next to Lake Matahina.

In 2018, the larger community consisted of about 150 people, including 30 families in the village at the base of the Lake Matahina Dam. Locals describe the community as close-knit and centred around the local school.

== History ==
=== Hone Tuwhare ===
Poet Hone Tuwhare lived in Te Mahoe during the 1950s and 1960s with his wife, writer Jean McCormack, and their three sons. He worked as a boiler-maker on the construction of the Matahina hydroelectric dam.

In 1962, the Whakatane Beacon newspaper published one of Tuwhare's poems. It began:

Up at the dam site, at Te Mahoe,
among the clatter of pneumatic drills,
the settling dust and the raw earth,
a man is writing poetry.

His first book was published two years later, in 1964, to immediate critical acclaim.

=== Cyclone Cook ===
The area was affected by Cyclone Cook in April 2017. The school was closed for several days. A boil water notice was issued for residents due to sediment from floodwaters contaminating water supplies.

== Demographics ==
Te Mahoe covers 9.30 km^{2} (3.59 sq mi). It is part of the Te Teko Lakes statistical area.

Historical population
Year	Pop.	±% p.a.
2006	117	—
2013	96	−2.79%
2018	84	−2.64%
2023	96	+2.71%

Te Mahoe had a population of 96 in the 2023 New Zealand census, an increase of 12 people (14.3%) since the 2018 census, and unchanged since the 2013 census. There were 45 males and 51 females in 24 dwellings. The median age was 25.5 years (compared with 38.1 years nationally). There were 30 people (31.2%) aged under 15 years, 24 (25.0%) aged 15 to 29, 36 (37.5%) aged 30 to 64, and 9 (9.4%) aged 65 or older.

People could identify as more than one ethnicity. The results were 21.9% European (Pākehā), 100.0% Māori, 3.1% Pasifika, and 9.4% Asian. English was spoken by 90.6%, Māori by 37.5%, and other languages by 3.1%. No language could be spoken by 6.2% (e.g. too young to talk). The percentage of people born overseas was 3.1, compared with 28.8% nationally.

Religious affiliations were 9.4% Christian, and 34.4% Māori religious beliefs. People who answered that they had no religion were 46.9%, and 9.4% of people did not answer the census question.

Of those at least 15 years old, 9 (13.6%) people had a bachelor's or higher degree, 36 (54.5%) had a post-high school certificate or diploma, and 24 (36.4%) people exclusively held high school qualifications. The median income was $32,600, compared with $41,500 nationally. The employment status of those at least 15 was 33 (50.0%) full-time, 9 (13.6%) part-time, and 6 (9.1%) unemployed.

== Education ==
Te Mahoe School is a co-educational state primary school for Year 1 to 8 students, with a roll of 33 as of July 2026. The school opened about 1960, and celebrated its silver jubilee in 1985.
