= Otamatea =

Otamatea may refer to:

- Otamatea County, former county of New Zealand
- Otamatea, Whanganui, suburb in New Zealand

== See also ==
- Otamatea High School in Maungaturoto
- Otamatea River (Bay of Plenty), a tributary of the Rangitaiki River
- Otamatea River (Northland) a long arm of the Kaipara Harbour
