= Wheao River =

- Route of the Wheao River
- Mouth of the Wheao River Wheao River (North Island)

Location
- Country: New Zealand

Physical characteristics
- Source
  - coordinates: 38°48′42″S 176°35′39″E
- Mouth
  - location: Rangitaiki River
  - coordinates: 38°33′39″S 176°38′34″E
- Length: 38 km (24 mi)

Basin features
- Progression: Wheao River → Rangitaiki River → Bay of Plenty → Pacific Ocean
- Landmarks: Wheao Dam
- Tributaries
  - left: Flaxy Creek, Rangitaiki Canal,
  - right: Waituheomana Stream, Otueta Stream, Waione Stream, Mangakaretu Stream, Mangamingi Stream

The Wheao River is a river of the Bay of Plenty region of New Zealand's North Island. An upper tributary of the Rangitaiki River, it flows predominantly north from its origins at Whirinaki Te Pua-a-Tāne Conservation Park through the Kaingaroa Forest to reach the Rangitaiki River at Ngahuinga Crossing, south of Murupara.

== History ==
The river is a part of the Wheao and Flaxy Hydro Power Scheme. During construction in 1982, a breach of the canal bank led to significant flooding of the power plant.

== See also ==
- List of rivers of New Zealand
