= Lake Āniwaniwa =

Lake in Bay of Plenty region, New Zealand

- Lake Aniwhenua
- Āniwaniwa (Māori)
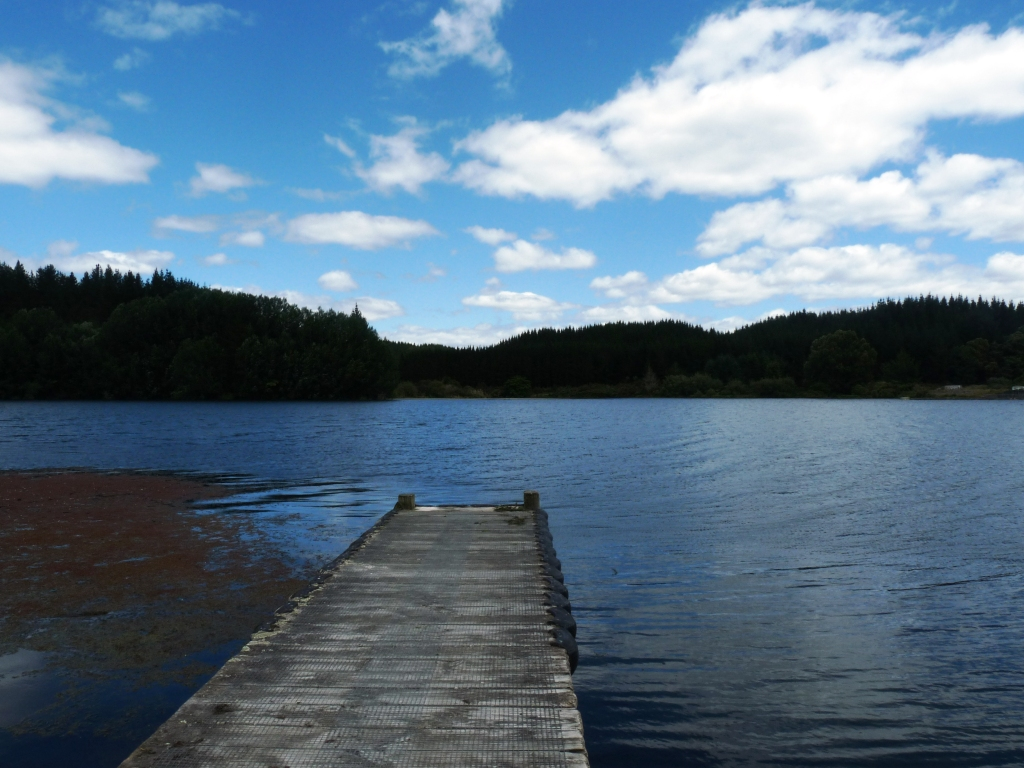
- View of Lake Āniwaniwa from the jetty

- Location of Lake Āniwaniwa in the North Island
- Location: Bay of Plenty, North Island, New Zealand
- Coordinates: 38°19′30″S 176°47′15″E
- Type: reservoir
- River sources: Rangitaiki River
- Max. length: 4.5 km (2.8 mi)
- Max. width: 0.5 km (0.31 mi)
- Surface area: 2.1 km^{2} (0.81 sq mi)
- Max. depth: 10 m (33 ft)

Lake Āniwaniwa (unofficially known as Lake Aniwhenua) is a small man-made lake on the Rangitaiki River, in the Bay of Plenty region of New Zealand. The lake is situated 13 km north of the town of Murupara, and about 16 km upstream of the Matahina Dam. The lake was created as a result of the construction of a 10 m high dam, part of the Aniwhenua hydroelectric scheme.

== Description ==
Lake Āniwaniwa is a long, shallow lake that measures 4.5 km long and 0.5 km across, with total area of about 2.1 km^{2}. The Whakatane District Council manages a campground on the northeastern lakeside, near the dam.

== History ==
A series of feasibility studies and investigations into establishing a hydroelectric scheme upstream from the Matahina Dam were performed throughout the 1970s. Construction on the scheme occurred between 1977 and 1981, and included the creation of a 10 m dam, which would hold back the newly formed Lake Āniwaniwa.

The original name of the lake was Lake Aniwhenua, which was erroneously taken from the name of the nearby Āniwaniwa falls. Under the Ngāti Manawa Claims Settlement Act 2012, Lake Āniwaniwa became the official name of the lake.

== Wildlife ==
=== Fish ===
Mature longfin and shortfin eels both migrate down the Rangitaiki River each autumn, following their upstream migration as elvers (juveniles). The construction of the dam at Lake Āniwaniwa, along with the Matahina dam downstream, have impeded this migratory pathway. Since the creation of the dam, numerous studies exploring strategies to mitigate the impact of the Lake Āniwaniwa dam on the migration of Rangitaiki have been conducted, often supported by the operators of the Aniwhenua hydroelectric scheme. The Department of Internal Affairs initiated a programme in 1983 to manually translocate elvers upstream, work later continued by the Department of Conservation and the Electricity Corporation of New Zealand. In 1995, the number of elvers being translocated annually to Lake Āniwaniwa reached 149,000. Some locals have taken it upon themselves to manually transfer elvers and mature eels to and from Lake Āniwaniwa.

Lake Āniwaniwa additionally contains both rainbow and brown trout, as well as mosquitofish, common bully and goldfish.

=== Birdlife ===
Lake Āniwaniwa is home to various species of native waterbirds, including the New Zealand shoveler, New Zealand scaup and Australian coot. Surveys conducted at the lake in the 1980s (around four years after the completion of the dam) also indicated the presence of other species such as the marsh crake, spotless crake, New Zealand dabchick and the threatened Australasian bittern.

=== Hunting and fishing ===
Both trout fishing and game bird hunting (during the annual hunting season) are permitted at Lake Āniwaniwa. In 2003, some controversy arose when the Fish & Game Council opened the north end of the lake to hunting. Some were concerned that it posed a safety risk given the proximity to the campground; however, Fish & Game argued that hunters had a responsibility to be cautious near public areas.
