= Te Teko =

Rural settlement in Bay of Plenty Region, New Zealand

- Rural settlement
- Interactive map of Te Teko
- Coordinates: 38°02′10″S 176°47′46″E
- Country: New Zealand
- Region: Bay of Plenty
- Territorial authority: Whakatāne District
- Ward: Rangitāiki General Ward
- Community: Rangitāiki Community
- Electorates: East Cape; Waiariki (Māori)

Government
  - Territorial authority: Whakatāne District Council
  - Regional council: Bay of Plenty Regional Council
  - Mayor of Whakatāne: Nándor Tánczos
  - East Cape MP: Dana Kirkpatrick
  - Waiariki MP: Rawiri Waititi

Area
  - Total: 0.38 km^{2} (0.15 sq mi)

Population (June 2025)
  - Total: 420
  - Density: 1,100/km^{2} (2,900/sq mi)

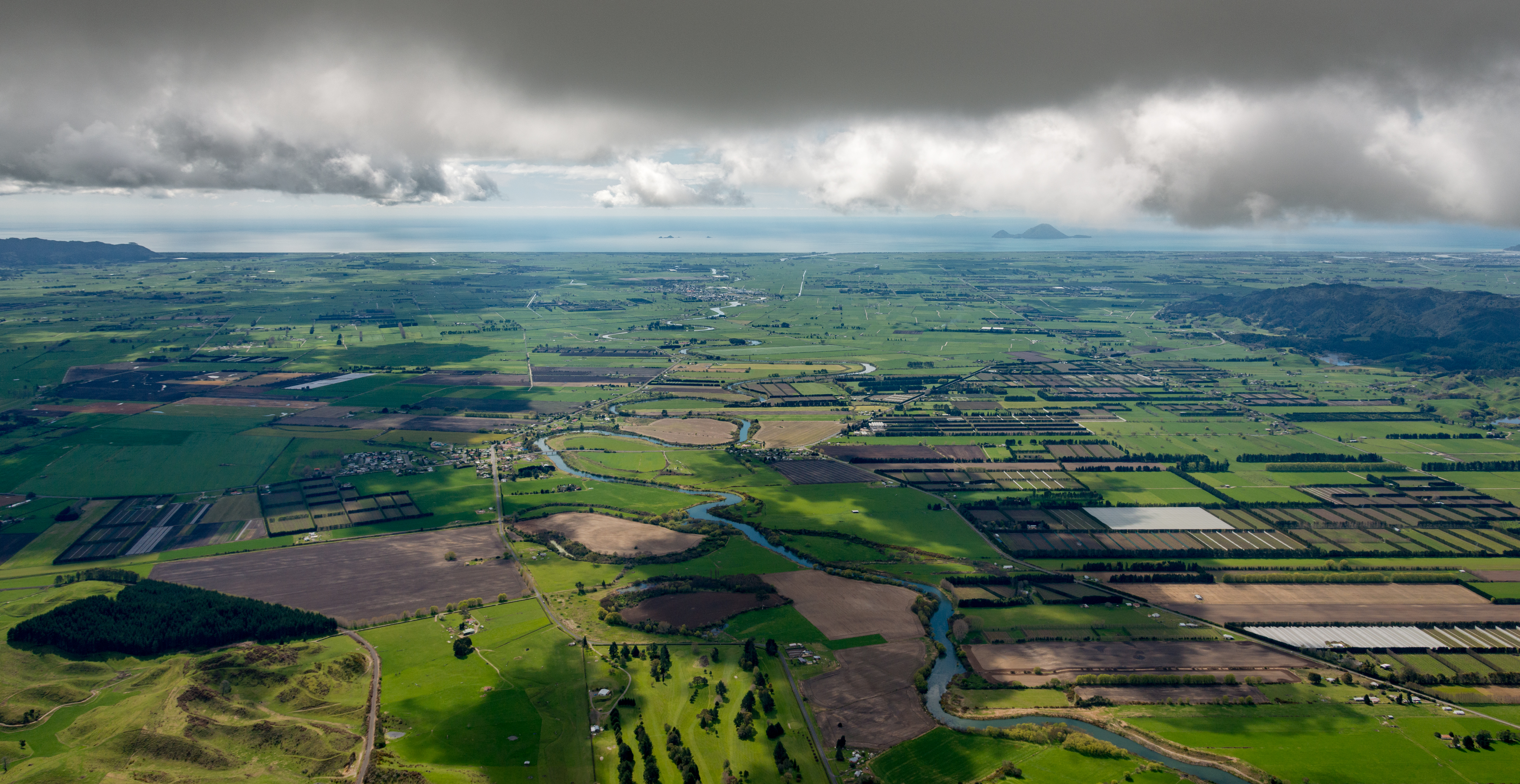
Rangitaiki Plains with Te Teko Golf Course in immediate foreground, Te Teko town beyond it, Bay of Plenty coast in the distance

Te Teko is a small inland town along the banks of the Rangitaiki River in the Bay of Plenty region of New Zealand's North Island.

The township includes a racecourse, golf course, police station, and a primary school. The primary school was established in 1881.

Te Teko is in the rohe (tribal area) of the Ngāti Awa iwi.

== History and culture ==
=== History ===
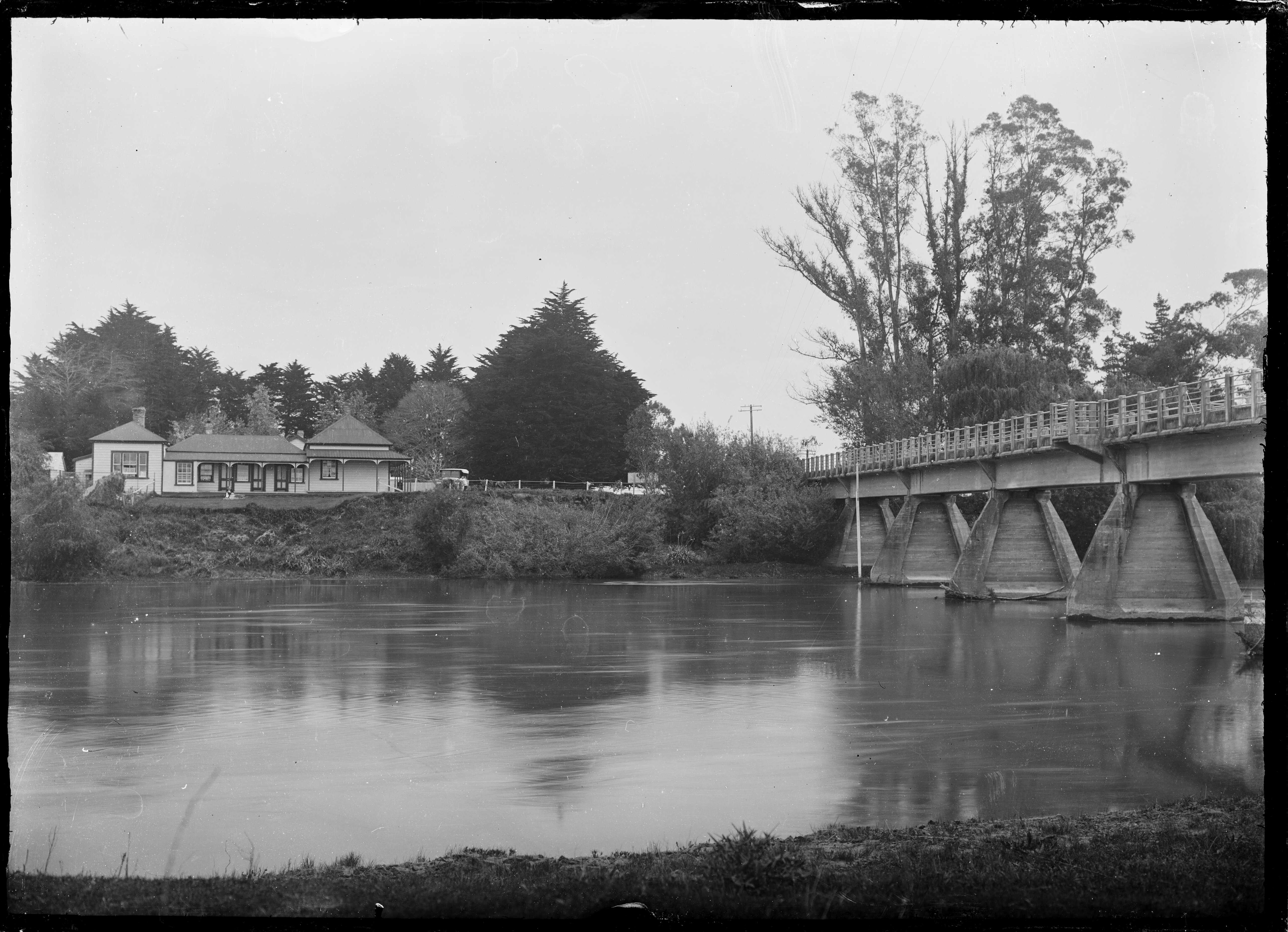
Rangitaiki River bridge at Te Teko, c. 1920s

In the pre-colonial period, Te Teko was the birthplace of Rangiteaorere, ancestor of Ngati Rangiteaorere.

In the mid-1860s, Te Teko was the site of a significant siege on a Māori pā as part of the East Cape War.

After peace came to the region, a hotel was established on the banks of the Rangitaiki River in 1879 and Te Teko rose in importance as a boat service was established to ferry hotel customers and travellers across the river. A bridge made the boat service redundant in 1915.

=== Marae ===
Te Teko has several marae, which are meeting grounds for Ngāti Awa hapū:

- Kokohinau or Tuhimata Marae and O Ruataupare meeting house are affiliated with Te Pahipoto.
- Te Māpou Marae and Rongotangiawa meeting house are affiliated with Ngāti Hāmua.
- Ruaihona Marae and Ruaihona meeting house are affiliated with Ngāi Tamaoki.
- Tuariki Marae and Tuariki meeting house are affiliated with Tuariki.
- Tūteao Marae and Tūteao meeting house are affiliated with Ngā Maihi.
- Uiraroa Marae and Uiraroa meeting house are affiliated with Ngāi Tamawera.

In October 2020, the Government committed $4,871,246 from the Provincial Growth Fund to upgrade a group of 12 marae, including Ruaihona, Tuariki, Tūteao and Uiraroa Marae, creating 23 jobs. It also committed $500,000 to upgrade Te Māpou Marae, creating 6.2 jobs.

== Demographics ==
Te Teko is described by Statistics New Zealand as a rural settlement, and covers 0.38 km^{2} (0.15 sq mi). It had an estimated population of 420 as of June 2025, with a population density of 1,105 people per km^{2}. Te Teko is part of the larger Te Teko Lakes statistical area.

Historical population for Te Teko
Year	Pop.	±% p.a.
2006	447	—
2013	339	−3.87%
2018	441	+5.40%
2023	408	−1.54%

Te Teko had a population of 408 in the 2023 New Zealand census, a decrease of 33 people (−7.5%) since the 2018 census, and an increase of 69 people (20.4%) since the 2013 census. There were 201 males and 210 females in 105 dwellings. 0.7% of people identified as LGBTIQ+. The median age was 29.6 years (compared with 38.1 years nationally). There were 105 people (25.7%) aged under 15 years, 102 (25.0%) aged 15 to 29, 171 (41.9%) aged 30 to 64, and 33 (8.1%) aged 65 or older.

People could identify as more than one ethnicity. The results were 22.1% European (Pākehā), 93.4% Māori, 6.6% Pasifika, and 1.5% Asian. English was spoken by 97.8%, Māori by 45.6%, and other languages by 1.5%. No language could be spoken by 2.9% (e.g. too young to talk). The percentage of people born overseas was 5.1, compared with 28.8% nationally.

Religious affiliations were 19.1% Christian, 0.7% Hindu, 0.7% Islam, 35.3% Māori religious beliefs, 0.7% Buddhist, and 0.7% other religions. People who answered that they had no religion were 37.5%, and 8.1% of people did not answer the census question.

Of those at least 15 years old, 33 (10.9%) people had a bachelor's or higher degree, 186 (61.4%) had a post-high school certificate or diploma, and 87 (28.7%) people exclusively held high school qualifications. The median income was $29,300, compared with $41,500 nationally. 9 people (3.0%) earned over $100,000 compared to 12.1% nationally. The employment status of those at least 15 was 147 (48.5%) full-time, 18 (5.9%) part-time, and 39 (12.9%) unemployed.

=== Te Teko Lakes statistical area ===
Te Teko Lakes statistical area, which also includes Te Mahoe, covers 71.10 km^{2} (27.45 sq mi) and had an estimated population of 1,810 as of June 2025, with a population density of 25 people per km^{2}.

Historical population for Te Teko Lakes
Year	Pop.	±% p.a.
2006	1,707	—
2013	1,449	−2.31%
2018	1,758	+3.94%
2023	1,785	+0.31%

Te Teko Lakes had a population of 1,785 in the 2023 New Zealand census, an increase of 27 people (1.5%) since the 2018 census, and an increase of 336 people (23.2%) since the 2013 census. There were 933 males and 846 females in 486 dwellings. 1.0% of people identified as LGBTIQ+. The median age was 33.7 years (compared with 38.1 years nationally). There were 405 people (22.7%) aged under 15 years, 390 (21.8%) aged 15 to 29, 759 (42.5%) aged 30 to 64, and 225 (12.6%) aged 65 or older.

People could identify as more than one ethnicity. The results were 32.8% European (Pākehā); 77.5% Māori; 7.7% Pasifika; 3.0% Asian; 0.5% Middle Eastern, Latin American and African New Zealanders (MELAA); and 0.7% other, which includes people giving their ethnicity as "New Zealander". English was spoken by 93.9%, Māori by 35.5%, Samoan by 0.3%, and other languages by 5.2%. No language could be spoken by 2.9% (e.g. too young to talk). New Zealand Sign Language was known by 0.7%. The percentage of people born overseas was 9.4, compared with 28.8% nationally.

Religious affiliations were 22.7% Christian, 0.2% Hindu, 0.3% Islam, 30.9% Māori religious beliefs, 0.3% Buddhist, 0.2% New Age, and 1.8% other religions. People who answered that they had no religion were 38.3%, and 7.6% of people did not answer the census question.

Of those at least 15 years old, 138 (10.0%) people had a bachelor's or higher degree, 825 (59.8%) had a post-high school certificate or diploma, and 420 (30.4%) people exclusively held high school qualifications. The median income was $30,400, compared with $41,500 nationally. 66 people (4.8%) earned over $100,000 compared to 12.1% nationally. The employment status of those at least 15 was 663 (48.0%) full-time, 153 (11.1%) part-time, and 129 (9.3%) unemployed.

== Geography ==
The Rangitaiki River passes through the town as it flows northwards to its mouth on the Pacific Ocean, and State Highways 30 and 34 meet in the town. SH 30 cuts through the town on its route from Whakatāne to Rotorua, while SH 34 crosses it in the town's west and runs southwest to Kawerau. To the west of the town runs the East Coast Main Trunk Railway, and from it diverges the Murupara Branch line, which skirts the south of Te Teko.

Te Teko has the highest mean daily maximum temperature (20.26 °C) of any settlement in New Zealand, although it is not the warmest town in New Zealand as the mean daily minimum temperature of 8.56 °C is comparatively low. Rainfall is high, averaging 1474mm per year.

=== Climate ===
Climate data for Te Teko (1971–2000 normals, extremes 1963–1994)
Month	Jan	Feb	Mar	Apr	May	Jun	Jul	Aug	Sep	Oct	Nov	Dec	Year
Record high °C (°F)	36.8 (98.2)	38.1 (100.6)	32.1 (89.8)	27.5 (81.5)	24.2 (75.6)	21.9 (71.4)	20.4 (68.7)	22.0 (71.6)	25.3 (77.5)	27.6 (81.7)	31.2 (88.2)	33.9 (93.0)	38.1 (100.6)
Mean maximum °C (°F)	31.3 (88.3)	30.8 (87.4)	28.1 (82.6)	25.0 (77.0)	21.6 (70.9)	19.0 (66.2)	18.0 (64.4)	19.0 (66.2)	21.7 (71.1)	24.6 (76.3)	26.8 (80.2)	28.3 (82.9)	32.2 (90.0)
Mean daily maximum °C (°F)	25.9 (78.6)	25.9 (78.6)	24.1 (75.4)	21.1 (70.0)	17.6 (63.7)	15.0 (59.0)	14.7 (58.5)	15.9 (60.6)	17.8 (64.0)	20.0 (68.0)	22.0 (71.6)	24.0 (75.2)	20.3 (68.6)
Daily mean °C (°F)	19.7 (67.5)	19.8 (67.6)	18.1 (64.6)	15.2 (59.4)	11.9 (53.4)	9.8 (49.6)	9.3 (48.7)	10.2 (50.4)	12.0 (53.6)	14.1 (57.4)	16.1 (61.0)	18.0 (64.4)	14.5 (58.1)
Mean daily minimum °C (°F)	13.5 (56.3)	13.7 (56.7)	12.1 (53.8)	9.3 (48.7)	6.2 (43.2)	4.6 (40.3)	3.9 (39.0)	4.5 (40.1)	6.1 (43.0)	8.3 (46.9)	10.3 (50.5)	12.1 (53.8)	8.7 (47.7)
Mean minimum °C (°F)	7.0 (44.6)	7.3 (45.1)	5.5 (41.9)	2.9 (37.2)	0.7 (33.3)	−0.8 (30.6)	−0.9 (30.4)	−0.8 (30.6)	0.7 (33.3)	2.5 (36.5)	4.0 (39.2)	5.9 (42.6)	−1.9 (28.6)
Record low °C (°F)	3.8 (38.8)	3.9 (39.0)	2.5 (36.5)	−1.0 (30.2)	−1.7 (28.9)	−2.5 (27.5)	−5.0 (23.0)	−3.6 (25.5)	−1.7 (28.9)	−1.7 (28.9)	0.4 (32.7)	2.5 (36.5)	−5.0 (23.0)
Average rainfall mm (inches)	95.3 (3.75)	106.5 (4.19)	127.4 (5.02)	103 (4.1)	113.6 (4.47)	142.7 (5.62)	110.6 (4.35)	137.3 (5.41)	119.5 (4.70)	122.3 (4.81)	93 (3.7)	110.6 (4.35)	1,381.8 (54.47)
Mean monthly sunshine hours	236.0	197.5	185.2	171.6	152.4	124.1	146.1	147.0	155.5	196.8	197.3	208.4	2,117.9
Source: NIWA

== Education ==
Te Kura o Te Teko is a co-educational state primary school for Year 1 to 8 students, with a roll of 140 as of July 2026. It opened in 1881.
