= Pikowai =

- Location within North Island
- Coordinates: 37°51′S 176°40′E
- Country: New Zealand
- Region: Bay of Plenty
- Territorial authority: Whakatāne District
- Ward: Rangitāiki

Pikowai is a rural community located near the beach on the shoreline of the Eastern Bay of Plenty in the North Island of New Zealand. Pikowai is located 34 km southeast of Te Puke and 10 kilometres northwest of Matatā. It is said to be a place where the Mataatua Canoe made landfall on its journey along the coast from Tauranga. Known for its fishing, the beach itself is well used for surf casting.

The name of 'Pikowai' means literally piko = bend + wai = stream, and well describes the ever-changing stream bed which leads fresh water down into the sea. This fresh water stream often forms a recreational ponding area where children can play.
