= Thornton, Bay of Plenty =

Thornton
- Motto: A coastal area, a coastal family. Thornton School. ~Shelly Bremner
- Interactive map of Thornton
- Coordinates: 37°55′20″S 176°52′00″E
- Country: New Zealand
- Region: Bay of Plenty
- Territorial authority: Whakatāne District
- Ward: Rangitāiki
- Community: Rangitāiki Community
- Electorates: East Cape; Waiariki (Māori)

Government
  - Territorial authority: Whakatāne District Council
  - Regional council: Bay of Plenty Regional Council
  - Mayor of Whakatāne: Nándor Tánczos
  - East Cape MP: Dana Kirkpatrick
  - Waiariki MP: Rawiri Waititi

Area
  - Total: 32.88 km^{2} (12.70 sq mi)

Population (2023 Census)
  - Total: 606
  - Density: 18.4/km^{2} (47.7/sq mi)

Thornton is a settlement in the Bay of Plenty Region of New Zealand. Thornton is located 13 kilometres (8.1 mi) west of Whakatāne, and is on the true right of the Rangitaiki River.

In 1911 the Rangitaiki River was put into a straight channel at the current site of Thornton, which enabled draining the Rangitaiki Plains and converting this swamp land into dairy country.

== Demographics ==
Thornton covers 32.88 km^{2} (12.70 sq mi). It is partly in the Matatā-Otakiri and partly in the Thornton-Awakeri statistical areas.

Historical population
Year	Pop.	±% p.a.
2006	516	—
2013	480	−1.03%
2018	528	+1.92%
2023	606	+2.79%
The 2006 population is for a larger area of 43.41 km^{2}. Source:

Thornton had a population of 606 in the 2023 New Zealand census, an increase of 78 people (14.8%) since the 2018 census, and an increase of 126 people (26.2%) since the 2013 census. There were 303 males and 303 females in 204 dwellings. 1.0% of people identified as LGBTIQ+. There were 111 people (18.3%) aged under 15 years, 93 (15.3%) aged 15 to 29, 273 (45.0%) aged 30 to 64, and 123 (20.3%) aged 65 or older.

People could identify as more than one ethnicity. The results were 86.1% European (Pākehā); 24.3% Māori; 1.0% Pasifika; 1.5% Asian; 0.5% Middle Eastern, Latin American and African New Zealanders (MELAA); and 1.5% other, which includes people giving their ethnicity as "New Zealander". English was spoken by 98.0%, Māori by 7.9%, and other languages by 3.0%. No language could be spoken by 1.5% (e.g. too young to talk). The percentage of people born overseas was 8.9, compared with 28.8% nationally.

Religious affiliations were 28.7% Christian, 0.5% Islam, 2.0% Māori religious beliefs, 0.5% New Age, and 0.5% other religions. People who answered that they had no religion were 58.4%, and 9.9% of people did not answer the census question.

Of those at least 15 years old, 69 (13.9%) people had a bachelor's or higher degree, 300 (60.6%) had a post-high school certificate or diploma, and 129 (26.1%) people exclusively held high school qualifications. 63 people (12.7%) earned over $100,000 compared to 12.1% nationally. The employment status of those at least 15 was 243 (49.1%) full-time, 87 (17.6%) part-time, and 6 (1.2%) unemployed.

== Education ==
Thornton School is a co-educational state primary school for Year 1 to 8 students, with a roll of 152 as of July 2026. It opened in 1912.
