= Horomanga River =

- Route of the Horomanga River
- Mouth of the Horomanga River Horomanga River (North Island)

Location
- Country: New Zealand

Physical characteristics
- Source: Confluence of the Tukuhouhou Stream and Arowhana Stream
  - location: Ikawhenua Range
  - coordinates: 38°31′02″S 176°51′53″E
- Mouth
  - location: Rangitaiki River
  - coordinates: 38°22′03″S 176°45′16″E
- Length: 27 kilometres (17 mi)

Basin features
- Progression: Horomanga River → Rangitaiki River → Bay of Plenty
- Tributaries
  - left: Whenuakite Stream, Tunopa Stream, Horokara Stream, Matikara Stream, Haumea Stream
  - right: Orupa Stream, Pongakawa Stream, Mangahaueo Stream, Kakea Stream, Raropo Stream, Ooheno Stream, Kotukutuku Stream, Mangawhero Stream, Te Ti Stream, Ohutu Stream

The Horomanga River is a river of the northeastern North Island of New Zealand. The river flows north through Te Urewera, reaching its confluence with the Rangitaiki River 12 kilometres (7 mi) north of Murupara.

== Description ==
A well formed horse track follows the river valley to its headwaters. There are an abundant amount of introduced species such as Red deer, Rusa deer and wild pigs that provide hunters and locals with a supply of meat and recreation. The river itself holds good numbers of rainbow and some brown trout. There is a rebuilt 5 bed hut where midway hut used to stand. Midway hut was burnt down. the forest cover in the river valley is predominantly Tawa and podocarps from the river level to about 700–800 metres, before transitioning to predominantly Tawai (beech) forest. The mountain range on the west side of the Horomanga is steep and rugged, with thick almost impenetrable bush. Serious care should be taken when hunting or tramping on this side of the river valley. The east side of the Horomanga is a sharp contrast to the west, as the bush here is more open, and the hills less steep. However, care should be taken when hunting on this side of the river, for the lower, less defined ridgelines of this area are easy to get disorientated or lost in.

== See also ==
- List of rivers of New Zealand
