= Lake Matahina =

Lake in Bay of Plenty region, New Zealand

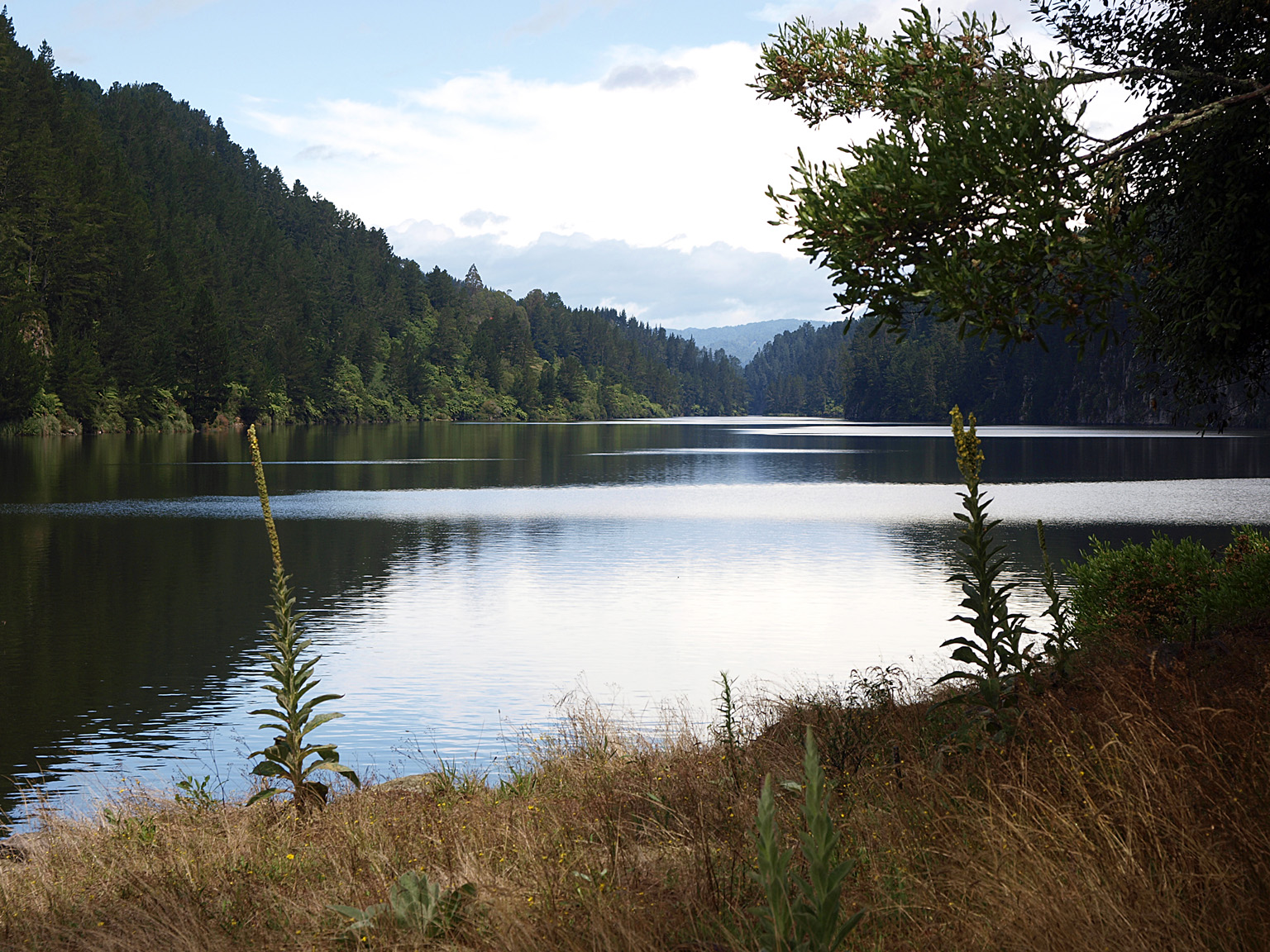
- Lakeside view of Lake Matahina

- Location of Lake Matahina in the North Island
- Location: Bay of Plenty, North Island, New Zealand
- Coordinates: 38°7′5″S 176°49′0″E
- Type: reservoir
- River sources: Rangitaiki River
- Built: 1960 to 1967
- Construction engineer: Ministry of Works
- First flooded: 1967
- Max. length: 6 km (3.7 mi)
- Surface area: 2.3 km^{2} (0.89 sq mi)
- Max. depth: 50 m (160 ft)
- Water volume: 55,000,000 m^{3} (1.9×10^{9} cu ft)

Lake Matahina is a reservoir in the Bay of Plenty region of New Zealand, located immediately south of the settlement of Te Mahoe and 50 km east of Rotorua. The lake was formed by the construction of the Matahina Power Station and its associated 86 m tall Matahina Dam on the Rangitaiki River, which was completed in 1967.

In 1969, five children drowned after driving a car into Lake Matahina at a camp that New Zealand author Barry Crump helped to run. Crump was charged with manslaughter over the deaths, but these charges were dropped. Fleur Adcock, one of Crump's ex-wives, said that it was negligence on his behalf that the children died.

== Depth ==
The lake has a maximum depth of 50 metres (160 ft), a relative depth of 2.8%, and an annually fluctuating water level of only 0.5 metres (1.6 ft) to 0.75 metres (2.5 ft). Upper reaches of the lake are shallow (1 to 4 m), with a sinuous channel constricted by a narrow ignimbrite gorge. As the gorge widens down lake, the depth increases to15 metres (49 ft) along a delta front, and to 40 metres (130 ft) to 50 metres (160 ft) in the basin immediately behind the dam.

== Lake levels ==
The lake's operating levels are as follows:

Description	Level (referenced to the Moturiki Datum)	Comments
Design Flood Level	76.8 m RL	Shall not exceed this level in all except “Emergency Condition” situations (as defined in Trustpower's “Lake Matahina Flood Management Plan”).
Maximum Lake level during floods of less than 200 cumecs	76.4 m RL	This is the spillway date crest level.
Maximum Normal Operating Level	76.2 m RL	Normal upper operating limit.
Minimum Normal Operating Level	73.15 m RL	Normal lower operating limit
Minimum Level (flood pending)	71.60 m RL	No generation below this level. Spillway gates reliant on mains power or back-up generator
Extreme Minimum Level (major flood >500 cumecs)	70.0 m RL	Approval is required from Bay of Plenty Regional Council to go below 71.6.

== Sedimentation ==
Since its creation the Matahina dam has acted as an effective barrier to the seaward movement of sediment by the Rangitaiki River. Pre-dam annual discharge figures for suspended and bed load sediment near the river mouth were about 201 000 and 188 000 tonne respectively, but equivalent post-dam values have dropped to 65 000 and 10 000 tonne. This trapping of sediment has halted or substantially reduced the downstream historical rising river bed and coastal progradation of the Rangitaiki plains.

While principal capture of sediment occurs at the upstream Aniwhenua dam which was completed in 1982, an increasing amount of sediment is being deposited in the deep portion of Lake Matahina.
