= Percy Murphy =

New Zealand politician (1924–2009)

Mayor of Murupara
- In office 1960–1969

Personal details
- Born: 6 March 1924 Whenuapai, New Zealand
- Died: 3 May 2009 (aged 85) Rotorua, New Zealand
- Awards: War Medal 1939–1945; New Zealand War Service Medal

Military service
- Allegiance: New Zealand
- Branch/service: Army
- Years of service: 1942–1945
- Rank: Private
- Unit: 28th Māori Battalion

Percival George Marunui Murphy (6 March 1924 – 3 May 2009) was a New Zealand businessman and local politician, notable for being the first Māori to hold the position of mayor in New Zealand.

Alongside three of his brothers he served in the Second World War. He was in the 28th Māori Battalion.

Following the war he was a businessman and community leader; he was on the Murupara Borough Council and then served as mayor of Murupara for three terms 1960 to 1969.

Following his retirement from politics, he remained active in the affairs of his iwi Ngāti Manawa and his marae Rangitahi. He died in Rotorua.
