= Otamatea River (Bay of Plenty) =

- Route of the Otamatea River
- Mouth of the Otamatea River Otamatea River (Bay of Plenty) (North Island)

Location
- Country: New Zealand

Physical characteristics
- Source: Otamatea Swamp
  - coordinates: 38°54′31″S 176°27′20″E
- Mouth
  - location: Rangitaiki River
  - coordinates: 38°44′41″S 176°23′36″E
- Length: 27 km (17 mi)

Basin features
- Progression: Otamatea River → Rangitaiki River → Bay of Plenty → Pacific Ocean

The Otamatea River is a river of the southwestern Bay of Plenty Region and eastern Taupō District of New Zealand's North Island. It flows generally north from its origins at the Otamatea Swamp in the northern foothills of the Ahimanawa Range, reaching the Rangitaiki River 25 km (16 mi) southwest of Taupō amid the Kaingaroa Forest.
