= Matahina Power Station =

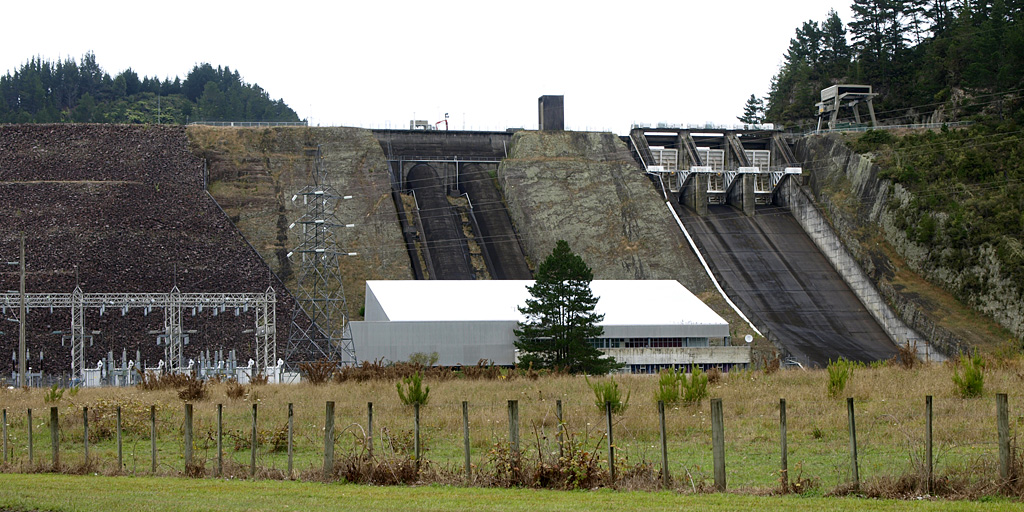
- Matahina Power Station

- Location within New Zealand
- Country: New Zealand
- Location: Bay of Plenty
- Coordinates: 38.113927°S 176.813930°E (For the powerhouse)
- Purpose: Power
- Status: Operational
- Construction began: 1960
- Opening date: 1967
- Built by: Ministry of Works
- Owners: New Zealand Department of Electricity(1967-1987); Electricity Corporation of New Zealand (1987-1991); Trustpower (1990- )
- Operator: Manawa Energy

Dam and spillways
- Type of dam: Embankment
- Impounds: Rangitaiki River
- Elevation at crest: 82.2 m
- Spillways: 1
- Spillway type: Surface chute with ski-jump type bucket

Reservoir
- Creates: Lake Matahina
- Total capacity: 55,000,000m^{3}
- Surface area: 2.3 km^{2}
- Maximum length: 6 km
- Maximum water depth: 50 m

Power Station
- Operator: Manawa Energy
- Commission date: 1967
- Type: Run of the river
- Hydraulic head: 76 metres
- Turbines: Two
- Pump-generators: Francis type
- Installed capacity: 80 MW (110,000 hp)
- Annual generation: 290 GWh (1,000 TJ)
- Website; Matahina Power Scheme

The Matahina power station is a hydroelectric power facility in Bay of Plenty in New Zealand on the Rangitaiki River downstream of the Aniwhenua Power Station. The river was dammed to form Lake Matahina from which water is drawn and diverted through the power station before being discharged back into the river. The Matahina dam is the largest earth embankment dam in the North Island of New Zealand.

== History ==
=== Development ===
The Ministry of Works (MOW) investigated all possible sources of hydro-electric power in New Zealand. With the last of the power stations on the Waitako River nearing completion and wishing to find work for itself and its large workforce, investigations were undertaken for four years in the late 1950s on the hydro-electric potential of the Bay of Plenty. As it held the most promise, the Kaituna River was the first to be considered for development. However, the Kaituna proposal was abandoned after detailed investigations found that all of the possible sites on the river would be expensive to develop due to their geological complexity and would only be able to generate a small amount of electricity. Instead, a site on the northward flowing Rangitaiki River at the mouth of the Rangitaiki Gorge was selected, where the river had eroded through ignimbrite of andesitic composition to underlying tertiary age sediments of weak conglomerate, sandstone, and siltstone.

In the mid-1950s, the MOW was short of experienced investigating engineers and senior design staff, which meant that without a full in-depth study, work on the scheme was started before Matahina was authorised under an Order in Council dated 14 January 1959.

In 1959, the Power Planning Committee recommended approval of Matahina and this was given by the government later in that same year. The intention was that the first electricity would be generated by April 1965, when there was expected to be a shortfall in generation capacity in the North Island. The estimated cost was £8 million.

When the National Party was returned to power in 1960, they stopped work on the Maraetai II power station and ordered that its two turbines be allocated to Matahina. The use of these turbines required some redesign work, which slowed down construction.

In 1961, the Power Planning Committee decided that Matahina was no longer urgent and could be delayed for two years, because of the priority that was being given to the HVDC Inter-Island link.

=== Construction ===
Work began in 1960 on access roading and the construction of Te Mahoe village.

As preliminary construction work began on site, detailed site investigations found that the site's geological conditions were more difficult than expected, with complicated ground faults, and that the river had worn through the solid ignimbrite rock in its bed, exposing loose gravel and rock. There were also pumice beds under the rock at one of the abutments.

Because Matahina was some distance from the support facilities that had been built up at Mangakino to build the Waikato River stations this required the establishment of a substantial number of temporary facilities on site.

After the Audit Department criticised the MOW's cooperative contract system and its method of reimbursing skilled tradesmen, the MOW introduced at Matahina a “daily project construction allowance”. However, the Public Service Commission refused to authorise the payment. The Cabinet refused the Commissioner of Works' argument that without the allowance it would be difficult to attract workers, as they believed these allowances would contribute to inflation and as well there was plenty of employment available in the Bay of Plenty, especially at Kawerau. As a result, the Cabinet ordered that the project to be closed down. However, the Commissioner gained the permission of the Minister of Works to undertake only a “slowing down”. This allowed excavation works to continue and all existing contracts to be completed. As a result, completion was expected to be delayed by 12 months.

==== Diversion tunnel ====
In February 1960, the MOW called tenders for the excavation and the driving of the diversion tunnel, which was 800 feet (240 m) long by 25 feet (7.6 m) diameter through a rock abutment on the west side of the river.

The MOW had estimated that the work would cost £510,000, but the three lowest tenders were all under, that with the lowest being from the French company Etudes et Enterprises (£257,150), followed by Dominion Earthmovers and Morrison-Knudson/Downer/Ferguson. The MOW considered voiding the lowest two, and giving the work to highest bidder as they were judged to be financially sounder and to have a workforce coming available, as they were completing Meremere Power Station. The MOW instead declined all offers and proposed to ask them to reprice with the performance bond increased from £20,000 to £100,000. Instead a revised price of £287,124 was accepted from Etudes et Enterprises. The company had undertaken work in Australia and in New Zealand to an acceptable standard, but was persona non grata on the Snowy Mountain because it had the habit of bidding low and then claiming excessive variations. They had also recently bid low for the contract to construct the Victoria Park motorway bridge in Auckland.

Etudes et Enterprises commenced work on what was a planned 18 month long project by cutting a pilot tunnel at the top of the arch of proposed tunnel. This would provide ventilation while constructing the main tunnel. The company did a poor job of supporting the ground which caused cavities to be created outside of the required tunnel dimensions and therefore more back filling. They also did a poor job of excavating the overburden that covered the downstream portal area, which was 50% higher than stated in the contract and after it did a poor job of excavating the material, things were not helped by MOW being slow in clearing the trees in the area. Until it could obtain access to the downstream portal, and so undertake a full excavation, Etudes et Enterprises kept its tunnellers busy by widening the pilot drive. It made a claim on the MOW for the delay and was paid half of the amount and granted an extension of six months. By early 1962 most of the tunnel had been driven and it was more than half lined with concrete. Despite this extension, Etudies still completed the tunnel 15 months later and was awarded £25,611 of additional costs which meant that the overall contract price was still cheaper than the other tenderers.

When the river was initially diverted through the diversion tunnel, the water scoured a large hole at the outlet of the tunnel. The cause was put down to hasty design. This required the construction of a stilling basin, which delayed full diversion by several months.

==== Work begins on the foundations ====
In 1962 the pace of construction work began to increase due to the river having been diverted and the work-force doubling as resources were released from elsewhere. Work began on the dam foundations, which was made more complex as in a reversal of normal conditions, the rock was on top of the sediments. The river had removed all of the rock along the bottom of the gorge, and had deposited a mixture of boulders, gravels, pumice and other debris that was unsuitable for use as a foundation.

Removal of this debris required excavation of a 1,000 feet (300 m) long by 160 feet (49 m) wide trench to a depth of 80 feet (24 m). A 20 feet (6.1 m) deep earthquake-resistant concrete cut-off wall was then constructed within it to control seepage. A specially imported machine was imported to make the concrete for this wall. It was a type of plastic concrete, designed to be pliable enough to withstand earthquakes. To further manage water seepage which was estimated to be 1,000 imp gal (4,500 L), the engineers drilled 60 drainage 100 feet (30 m) deep wells below foundation level and filled them with gravel.

==== Dewatering ====
As detailed site investigations were undertaken, it soon became clear that the site of the power station was next to an active earthquake faultline, offered poor foundations and the surrounding area lacked suitable material for an earth dam. As problems with the material that was being used in the construction of the dam would require extensive grouting to control potential seepage, the MOW decided to install as a safety measure a dewatering tunnel to provide a means of partially lowering the water behind the dam, as well as a number of small drainage and grouting tunnels.

Four tenderers were received from Fletcher Construction, Downers, Wilkins & Davies, Green & McCahill to undertake the required work. As Fletcher Construction was the lowest at £326,993, it was awarded the contract, and completed the work six months early and £676 below the original contract price.

==== Construction ramps up ====
The intake and spillway structures were almost complete by 1963, and progress had been made on the powerhouse. By 1964, installation of the dam's foundations had been completed and the powerhouse was being prepared for installation of the turbines. In that same year the workforce reached its peak of nearly 700. Beginning in September 1964 the dam's core was formed. By 1965 nearly 3,000,000 cu yd (2,300,000 m^{3}) of material had been installed, the powerhouse was almost complete, all concrete structures had been completed and progress had been made on installing the generating units.

The dam was constructed with a sloping earth 600,000 cu yd (460,000 m^{3}) core flanked by inner and outer transition zones. Sandy clayey silt and silty clay derived from weathered greywacke was used to form the core of the dam. It was placed dry of optimum to high densities. It was however stiff and susceptible to cracking under shear at low confining pressures and is also readily erodible. On each face of the core an inner transition was formed of unwelded ignimbrite, which was compacted to such a high density and had a high unconfined compressive strength that the subsequent inspection gallery was tunnelled through this material without the need for any excavation support. The faces of the inner transition were then covered with an outer transition constructed of a mix of the fine grades of hard ignimbrite, sandy gravel and gravelly silt. Lastly, rockfill formed hard ignimbrite blocks ranging in size from 150 metres (490 ft) to 900 metres (3,000 ft) were added and compacted by heavy tractor track rolling to form the exterior upstream and downstream faces of the dam.

==== Commissioning ====
As a result of issues with obtaining suitable materials for the earth dam, modifying the design to take account of the adverse site ground conditions and extensive grouting and installing additional drainage tunnels, filling of the lake was delayed.

During the filling of the lake a large temporary increase in flow from the drainage blanket was observed, followed shortly afterwards by the finding of an erosion cavity downstream of the core in the east (right) abutment area. The lake was lowered and exploratory pits revealed that shear deformations induced by benches in the abutment had led to cracking of the core and inner transition of the dam. This needed extensive remedial work on the core, which combined with the previous delays meant that completion of the power station was delayed by two years, by which time the cost had doubled.

Generator 1 was commissioned on 25 January 1967 and generator 2 in April 1967.

=== Service ===
In 1978, the New Zealand Department of Electricity which had been operating the power station since its commissioning was restructured into the Ministry of Energy. In 1987, the government established a state-owned enterprise called the Electricity Corporation of New Zealand (Electricorp) to take over the trading operations of the Ministry of Energy.

=== 1987 Edgecumbe earthquake ===
The power station was strongly shaken during the 1987 Edgecumbe earthquake. The instrument at the base of the dam recorded a M_{L} 5.2 foreshock, the M_{L} 6.3 main shock and the largest aftershock, a M_{L} 5.5 event eight minutes after the main shock. The accelerometers on site also recorded that the dam had been subjected to a peak ground acceleration of 0.33 g at its base and in the upstream-downstream direction 0.43 g at the crest. A landslide generated by the earthquake into Lake Matahina from road works created a series of approximately one metre high waves, with reports that several of these waves overtopped the spillway gate.

Power generation was interrupted when one generator was shut down by a shock-activated protective relay. Generation was resumed about 12 hours later, after a damage survey had disclosed while there had been damage, the dam was secure and there was no cause for concern. The crest of the dam spread a little in the shaking, while minor cracking was apparent near each abutment in the road traversing the crest. A subsequent survey found that downstream displacement varied from zero at the abutments to 268 millimetres (10.6 in) at the centre of the crest. Settlement in rockfill shoulders continued for some weeks afterwards, reaching 102 millimetres (4.0 in) in the downstream shoulder and a maximum of 800 millimetres (31 in) in the upstream shoulder.

Meanwhile, as a precaution and to facilitate inspection, the spillway gates were opened and the lake level was drawn down 2.5 metres (8.2 ft). This had not been done immediately following the earthquake, as electricity was not available to power the spillway gates from either from the station's local service system or from the external electrical lines. As a result, it took a few hours until the spillway gates could be opened.

To those residents downstream who were unaware of the deliberate nature of this action, the increase in the river flow raised apprehension, lending weight to rumours of critical damage at the dam. Resulting fears of an imminent failure of the dam, spread through the population living along the banks of the Rangitaiki, causing a panicked spontaneous evacuation of people from the village of Te Mahoe and other settlements along the river.

Although no abnormal leakage flows were observed, as a precaution in case the issues that had occurred during the original completion of the dam had reoccurred, a programme of performance monitoring and investigations was implemented. While no leakage was found in the following months, evidence of core cracking was discovered near the west abutment, similar to that which had occurred at the east abutment when the lake had first been filled. Investigations were unable to determine whether this damage had been due to the strain on the structure when it was first fill in 1967, or due to the 1987 earthquake, or to both.

The lake had been operating below its normal operating level over the course of these investigations when in December 1987, an erosion cavity developed in the crest surface above the damage near the west abutment. This was attributed to erosion of the surface subsidence, which had been noticeable for many years and which had previously been thought to have been caused by heavy traffic. This discovery resulted in the generation of electricity being stopped and drawing down of the lake from the 2.5 metres (8.2 ft) below normal that it had been operating by a further 6 metres (20 ft) in order to allow repairs to be undertaken.

While the dam was being repaired, the opportunity was taken to address the now identified latent flaws which had the potential to cause issues in the future, by making the following modifications to the core and transition zones and the core-foundation contacts at both abutments:

- Substitution of the stiff, brittle material in the damaged areas in the core with a softer, more plastic material, which was better able to accommodate strain
- Introduction of more suitable transition material between core and shoulders.
- Smoothing the originally stepped, crack-inducer profile of the concrete surface at the junction between earth core and concrete abutment.

These repairs and modifications lasted from December 1987 until mid-1988, and cost $16.5 million, of which $7 million was the cost of improvements.

=== Strengthening of the dam ===
The Waiohau fault (which is one of the faults of the North Island Shear Belt system) runs through the base of the dam, with the linear nature of the river valley south of the dam and the vertical offset of formation contacts across the valley attributed to the fault. During the original dam design studies in the early 1960s, an exposure in the ignimbrite ridge, 300 metres (980 ft) west of the west abutment, was inferred to be the main trace of the fault. Although fault traces were exposed in the bottom of the core trench during construction, they were considered to be inactive at that time.

During a reappraisal of the seismic risk at the site, which included trenching across the fault just south of the reservoir, evidence was found that there were four traces of the Waiohau fault (later revised to six by discoveries during subsequent strengthening of the dam). This fault was considered to have generated four major earthquakes in the previous 11,800 years and has the potential for generating large surface fault displacements at the dam site.

As part of this work, a Safety Evaluation Earthquake (SEE) was identified, with characteristics more intense than the mean of an expected Waiohau earthquake. The SEE was estimated to have a moment magnitude scale value of M_{W} 7.2 with a corresponding horizontal acceleration of 1.25g (equivalent to 2.7 metres (8.9 ft) of horizontal shear and vertical peak acceleration of 1.35g (equivalent to 1.3 metres (4.3 ft) of vertical shear) and 3 metres (9.8 ft) of oblique slip on the fault. The evaluation determined that a full displacement event could occur on any of the traces.

This SEE could cause a rupture of the impervious core of the dam and thus a calamitous failure. While the risk was considered small due to the very large mean recurrence interval of a Waiohau fault earthquake, the vulnerability of the dam to these earthquakes combined with the depth and volume of Lake Matahina made the hazard unacceptable to the Electricity Corporation of New Zealand (ECNZ).

As a result, engineering work was commissioned to strengthen the dam in order to prevent a catastrophic release of the lake after a SEE and so to protect downstream populations and property, including that owned by the ECNZ. However, it was not expected that the dam could return to service without substantial reconstruction. The proposed strengthening was reviewed and endorsed by an International Review Board.

It was decided to strengthen the dam by installing a leakage-resistant downstream buttress which would prevent internal erosion of the core and inner transition from leading to accelerated piping of the dam or collapse of the dam crest. This buttress incorporates a filter, transition and drain zones, an enlarged rockfill shell, and a zone of oversize rockfill at the toe. The crest of the dam was widened, and was raised by 3 metres (9.8 ft) to 82.2 metres (270 ft)RL, so that the dam is capable of passing the 20-year flood (500 cumecs) following a SEE without overtopping, even if the spillway was to be out of service.

The lake had been lowered to about elevation 45 metres RL immediately after the dam's deficiencies had been identified in July 1996, and it was maintained at approximately this level throughout construction using the low-level outlet. The spillway gates were also kept open to manage any floods.

Once the design had been completed, Thiess Contractors undertook a $50 million contract to modify the dam, with completion in mid-1998. The strengthening works were organized so that dam could be capable, while the construction works were underway, of passing a 100-year flood with 3 m of freeboard and the 1,000-year flood without overtopping, with all spillway gates open.

=== Purchase by Trustpower ===
After deciding that Matahina was a non-core asset due to its size and location away from the major river systems, Electricorp decided to sell it along with four other stations. The power station was sold to TrustPower in 1999 for $115 million.

== Design ==
The civil structures were designed and constructed by the Ministry of Works, while the electrical plant was designed and installed by the New Zealand Electricity Department.

The Matahina Power Station is located on the Rangitāiki River, just upstream of the village of Te Mahoe and approximately 29 km south of the town of Edgecumbe and some 37 km downstream of where the river mouth.

This power station is the lower most of three hydro-electric facilities on the Rangitaiki River. The others being Aniwhenua Power Station and the Wheao and Flaxy Power Scheme.

The embankment type Matahina Dam impounds Rangitaiki River approximately 37 km from the river mouth to create the warm monomictic gorge-type Lake Matahina which is approximately 6 km in length with a surface area of 2.3 km^{2}, containing approximately 55,000,000 m^{3} of water. The lake and has an upstream catchment of 2,844 km^{2} which ranges in altitude from 150 metres (490 ft) to 1,300 metres (4,300 ft). The lake has a maximum depth of 50 metres (160 ft), a relative depth of 2.8%, and an annually fluctuating water level of only 0.5 metres (1.6 ft) to 0.75 metres (2.5 ft). Upper reaches of the lake are shallow (1 to 4 m), with a sinuous channel constricted by a narrow ignimbrite gorge. As the gorge widens down lake, the depth increases to15 metres (49 ft) along a delta front, and to 40 metres (130 ft) to 50 metres (160 ft) in the basin immediately behind the dam.

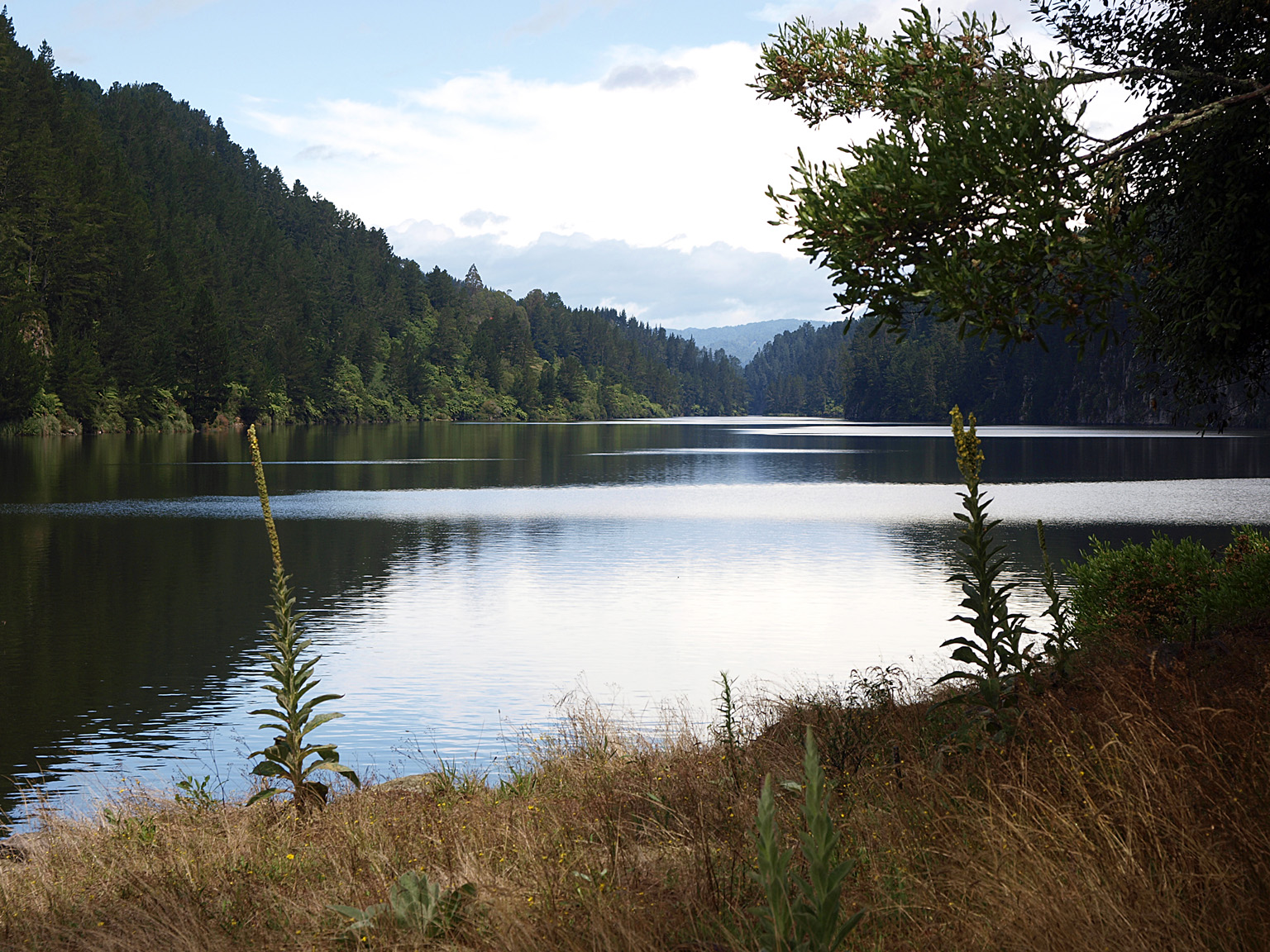
Lake Matahina

As the Rangitaiki River has high water flow generation from the station tends to be 'run-of-river' rather than on the basis of stored water.

The dam has crest length of 1,300 feet (400 m), is 1,200 feet (370 m) wide at its base and has a height of 86 metres (282 ft) above foundation level with a 76 metres (249 ft) head behind the dam. It has a core of 600,000 cu yd (460,000 m^{3}) of impermeable compacted weathered greywacke clay with hard ignimbrite rock shoulders.

The dam abutments are hard rock underlain by compact alluvial materials at lower levels. The diversion and dewatering tunnels, the spillway, the penstocks and powerhouse are located on a prominent rock spur which forms the west abutment. A grout curtain forms a partial cutoff within the spur supplemented by two drainage drives. The core material is constructed of weathered low plasticity gravelly clay greywacke, with transition zones on each face made of ignimbrite fines and softer quarry strippings. The transition zones are in turn protected on the upstream and downstream faces of the dam by shoulders made of hard ignimbrite rockfill. Galatea Road runs across the top of the dam.

From the dam two 16.5 feet (5.0 m) internal diameter penstocks direct water subjected to a 76-metre gross head to the Dominion Engineering Canada Francis 50,000 hp turbines located in the powerhouse which in turn which drive English-Electric salient pole synchronous 40 MW 11 kV generators. Each generator is connected via a dedicated 11/110 kV Ynd3 40 MVA transformer directly to the national grid via Transpower's Kawerau Substation.

Both generators were originally governed by Woodward mechanical governors. By the early 2000s these governors were deteriorating to the point that it took an extended period of time from start to the online state. Maintenance was also becoming difficult. Investigation had identified that do to their short penstock the turbine's guide vanes could be opened from 0 to 100% in 4 secs, which would make the station suitable for bidding into the New Zealand reserves market. However existing governors meant that the full financial benefit could not be obtained. As a result, in May 2010 they were replaced by Rivermaster DFG-110 governors which were customised to maximise include not only all normal governor functions but also synchronous condensing and reserves market operation. To assist the governors the hydraulics were modified by a local engineering company to a design by a Trustpower mechanical engineer. The modified hydraulics interfaced with the new governor via a 4-20mA control loop.

There is also an auxiliary hydro generator which is supplied by its own dedicated steel penstock. This generator supplies power to the station services.

The power house is 200 feet (61 m) long by 108 feet (33 m) by 60 feet (18 m) high. The powerhouse has five levels ranging from the pump room 50 feet (15 m) below the main floor to the office 15 feet (4.6 m) above. The main floor is home to the machine hall, station control and relay rooms, workshops and personnel facilities.

On the western (left) side of the dam is a 100 feet (30 m) wide concrete surface chute with ski-jump type bucket spillway with a capacity of 2,300 cumecs, which is used to manage flood events. It is fitted with three 12.5 metres (41 ft) high by 8.5 metres (28 ft) wide radial gates.

Located in the west abutment of the dam structure is a diversion and dewatering tunnel with a discharge capacity of up to 170 cumecs of water. This can be opened in emergencies to pass water or drain the lake.

Water pressure in the dam and foundations is monitored by an extensive network of piezometers. Motion movement at the site is measured by five accelerographs, three within the dam and two at the abutments. A large number of surface markers have also been installed on the dam and concrete structures to assist in monitoring movement over the site.

== Operation ==
Inflows into the lake are normally managed through generation with the spillways gates available to manage larger inflows. The amount of electricity generated by the station is dependent on the next head and the efficiency of the generating units, varying from approximately 1.75 cumecs per MW at peak output during high lake levels to over 2.5 cumecs per MW at low flows when the lake is near the bottom of its operating range.

The turbines have a “rough running” range at loads between 12 MW and 18 MW (equivalent to 29 and 41 cumecs of flow), which exposes them to damage from cavitation.

Operation of the power station is covered by the requirements of five resource consents. These consents define (amongst other things) the maximum and minimum generating load, ramping rates (both increasing and decreasing) and the number of operating peaks per day.

For its first year of service the power station was operated about half the time as a single peak scheme, and half as a run-of-river scheme. From 1969 to 1979 the power station was operated predominantly as a run-of-river scheme with limited single peaking. In 1980 a twin peak trial was undertaken for 20% of the time, but it was terminated after concern was expressed regarding river bank stability. From 1981 to 2002 the power station was operated predominantly as a single peak scheme before depending on inflows changing to a mix of one or two daily peaks, except during periods of low flow or floods.

Prior to 2007 the power station was not allowed to generate less than 22 MW except when the river inflow is less than this, with the added restriction that when the river inflow was less than 40 cumecs no peaking was permitted. As this caused problems when running in the turbine rough running range, Trustpower reached an informal agreement with the Regional Council in June 2007 for a revised low flow operating regime which applies when reservoir inflows are below 22 MW (about 45 cumecs). This allows the generation to drop below the rough running range at night, to allow generation above the rough running range during the day as long as the average generation outflow matches the average reservoir inflow over 24 hours; and the Regional Council and Fonterra are to be advised at the start and finish of operation.

Trustpower was granted a revised resource consent on 23 February 2012 that allowed for: 'Peaks' in generation flows in response to electricity market conditions when inflows to Lake Matahina are equal to or greater than 20 cumecs, specified a ramping down rate of a constant 30 cumecs per hour, a maximum allowable ramping up rate of 97 cumecs per hour while requiring a 40 cumec minimum flow downstream of the dam (other than when inflows to the lake are less than this with an absolute minimum flow of 28 cumecs. These constraints expire in 2048.

In June 2016, a modified operating regime was agreed, which specified that a new minimum flow of 35 cumecs must be maintained at the Te Teko flow measuring station.

The consented maximum discharge is 160 cumecs.

The lake's operating levels are as follows:

Description	Level (referenced to the Moturiki Datum)	Comments
Design Flood Level	76.8 m RL	Shall not exceed this level in all except “Emergency Condition” situations (as defined in Trustpower's “Lake Matahina Flood Management Plan”).
Maximum Lake level during floods of less than 200 cumecs	76.4 m RL	This is the spillway date crest level.
Maximum Normal Operating Level	76.2 m RL	Normal upper operating limit.
Minimum Normal Operating Level	73.15 m RL	Normal lower operating limit
Minimum Level (flood pending)	71.60 m RL	No generation below this level. Spillway gates reliant on mains power or back-up generator
Extreme Minimum Level (major flood >500 cumecs)	70.0 m RL	Approval is required from Bay of Plenty Regional Council to go below 71.6.

=== Flood Control ===
There was considerable pressure exerted at the time of the power station's design, especially by the Rangitāiki Drainage Board, to make the power station available for flood control purposes by using it to lower Lake Matahina in advance of floods in order to reduce downstream peak flood flows. The Ministry of Works were however opposed to this proposition. In the end, agreement was reached that the power station would be operated so as to enable the spilling of water before the arrival of a flood peak.

The Bay of Plenty Catchment Commission (the predecessor to the Regional Council) prepared guidelines to reflect that agreement in 1964. In 1968 the Bay of Plenty Catchment Commission produced a report titled The Operation of Matahina Dam During Floods, which described an operating protocol for lowering Lake Matahina based on information from ten manual upstream rain gauges and two telemetered river level recorders at Kopuriki and Galatea.

It is not known how effectively this protocol was applied.

Following a major flood in 2004, which had been the largest since construction of the power station a flood management plan was agreed between the Regional Council and Trustpower. This described the procedures to be followed in order to use the power station to reduce the probability and severity of any downstream flooding, while staying within the limits imposed by a number of factors, mostly related to ensuring the dam's structural integrity.

During Cyclone Debbie in March 2017, the power station was successfully used to manage the abnormally high river levels in the Rangitāiki River to a less than one-in-100 year flood downstream of the power station. This was despite the Rangitāiki River at Lake Matahina, reaching estimated inflows of 920 cumecs which roughly equates to a one-in-200 year flood.

Following the purchase of the power station by Trustpower flood operating protocols for Lake Matahina were developed and agreed with the Bay of Plenty Regional Council as part of the reconsenting process for the dam in 2013. These are documented in Trustpower's “Lake Matahina Flood Management Plan” (2016) which describes specific instructions relating to dam operations for minor floods (greater than 300 cumecs) and major floods (greater than 500 cumecs) and relate to resource consent conditions 42 and 43.

These state that: “Where inflow is forecast to exceed 500 m_{3}/s within the next 24 hours, lake drawdown will be managed by Trustpower to reach and maintain a lake level between 71.6 m RL and 70.0 m RL before inflows exceed 500 m_{3}/s. Trustpower shall not however, lower the lake level such that it falls below 71.6 m RL without the prior approval of the Chief Executive, BOPRC”.

=== Fish Passage ===
Since 1983 a trap and transfer programme has been operated at Matahina by the Kokopu Trust on behalf of Trustpower to assist elver and other native fish species to migrate past the dam and thus maintain eel and fish stocks in the upper reaches of the river.

On average, two million elver are transferred upstream each year. As well a number of adult downstream migrating eel are caught at the dam and transferred to the lower reaches of the Rangitāiki River. While some of the fish caught in the trap are transferred to Lake Matahina. The majority was released in Lake Aniwhenua and the upper Rangitāiki River.

Trustpower has been sponsoring the development of a device based on the concept of the Archimedes screw in the hope that it can be utilized to transfer migrating elver from the station tail race into a holding tank inside the power station. If successful this will reduce human interaction with the elver. A trial with elvers and native fish was undertaken during 2019–2020 season.

=== Sedimentation ===
Since its creation in 1967 the Matahina dam has acted as an effective barrier to the seaward movement of sediment by the Rangitaiki River. Pre-dam annual discharge figures for suspended and bed load sediment near the river mouth were about 201 000 and 188 000 tonne respectively, but equivalent post-dam values have dropped to 65 000 and 10 000 tonne. This trapping of sediment has halted or substantially reduced the downstream historical rising river bed and coastal progradation of the Rangitaiki plains.

While principal capture of sediment occurs at the upstream Aniwhenua dam which was completed in 1982, an increasing amount of sediment is being deposited in the deep portion of Lake Matahina.

== See also ==
- Hydroelectric power in New Zealand
