= Rangitaiki River =

River in New Zealand

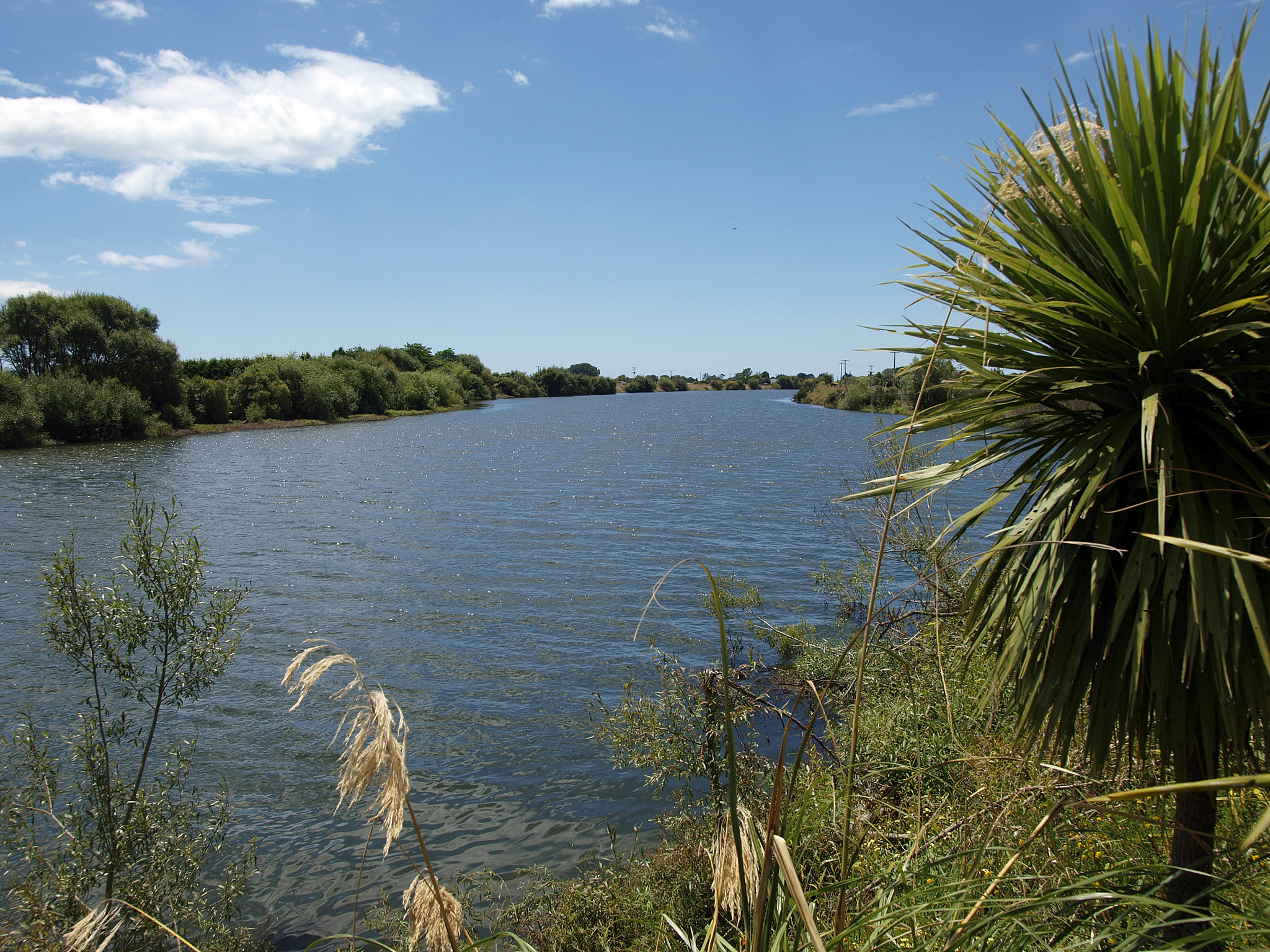
- Rangitaiki River, between Edgecumbe and Thornton
- Route of the Rangitaiki River
- Native name: Rangitāiki (Māori)

Location
- Country: New Zealand
- Region: Bay of Plenty
- District: Taupō, Whakatāne
- Towns: Murupara, Edgecumbe, Thornton

Physical characteristics
- Source: Confluence of the Tirikahu Stream and Lake Pouarua
  - coordinates: 38.95634°S 176.40756°E
- Mouth
  - location: Bay of Plenty
  - coordinates: 37.909°S 176.882°E
  - elevation: Sea level
- Length: 155 kilometres (96 mi)
- Basin size: 3,005 square kilometres (1,160 mi^{2})
- Discharge
  - average: 74 m^{3}/s (2,600 cu ft/s)

Basin features
- Progression: Rangitaiki River → Bay of Plenty → Pacific Ocean
- Tributaries
  - left: Waikaukau Stream, Pekepeke Stream, Wairohia Stream, Ngatamawahine Stream, Pahekeheke Stream, Waikowhewhe Stream, Waitaruna Stream
  - right: Otamatea River, Mangakokomuka Stream, Mangatiti Stream, Wheao River, Mangapaepae Stream, Waiariari Stream, Whirinaki River, Omahuru Stream, Horomanga River, Mangahouhi Stream, Mangapapa Stream, Kioreweku Stream, Mangamako Stream, Waihua Stream, Tawhia Stream, Mangamutu Stream, Waikokopu Stream, Kaiwhakinokino Stream, Waikuku Stream, Kakahotoa Stream, Reids Central Canal
- Waterbodies: Lake Āniwaniwa, Lake Matahina
- Waterfalls: Motutoa Rapids, Āniwaniwa Falls

The Rangitaiki River, also known as the Rangitāiki River, is the longest river in the Bay of Plenty region in New Zealand's North Island. It is 155 kilometres (96 mi) long, and rises inland to the east of the Kaingaroa Forest in the Taupō District. The Rangitaiki catchment covers an area of 3,005 km^{2} (1,160 sq mi). It flows in a generally northeastward direction, passing through the town of Murupara and skirting close to the western edge of Te Urewera National Park before turning northwards, flowing past Edgecumbe and into the Bay of Plenty close to Thornton.

There are two man-made lakes on the Rangitaiki formed by hydro-electric dams, Lake Āniwaniwa (formerly Lake Aniwhenua). and Lake Matahina.

== Geography ==
The river is 155 kilometres (96 mi) long, rising at an elevation of 740 metres (2,430 ft) above mean sea level, 32 kilometres (20 mi) east of Lake Taupō and 130 kilometres (81 mi) south of the Bay of Plenty coast. From its source in the Ahimanawa Ranges, at the confluence of the Tirikahu Stream and the outflow from Lake Pouarua, it flows for 64 kilometres (40 mi) across the Kaingaroa Plains towards Murupara.

Near the northern edge of the plains the river has been dammed by the Rangitāiki Dam, approximately 18 kilometres (11 mi) downstream of its confluence with the Wheao River. The dam diverts all but at least 0.5 cumecs into the Wheao and Flaxy power scheme, which discharges into Wheao River which joins the Rangitaiki upstream of Murupara. By the time it reaches the settlement at Murupara the river has a catchment of over 720 km (450 mi)^{2}. Within 20 kilometres (12 mi) downstream of Murupara, two major tributaries, the Whirinaki River and the Horomanga River enter the river on the eastern side. The river then continues north over the Galatea Plains before it enters the man-made Lake Āniwaniwa, the waters of which power the Aniwhenua Power Station.

Below the power station the river passes over the Āniwaniwa Falls and then squeezes through a narrow chasm. Downstream of the dam, the main channel passes through a gorge and then out onto the Waiohau Plains and past the settlement of Waihau. Several small tributaries arising in the Ikawhenua Ranges cross the Waiohau Plains to join the Rangitaiki.

The river travels for 13 kilometres (8.1 mi) across the Waiohau Plains before it enters a gorge housing the man-made Lake Matahina the waters of which power the Matahina Power Station. No major tributaries enter the river downstream of the Lake Matahina. Below Matahina the Rangitaiki passes the village of Te Mahoe and through a well-defined valley before crossing the 29,000 ha Rangitaiki Plains and passing the settlements of Te Teko, Edgecumbe and Thornton. At Edgecumbe a large dairy factory owned by Fonterra discharges waste products into the river. The river finally enters the sea at Thornton through a man-made 1,500 metres (4,900 ft) long channel.

== History ==
The arrival of Europeans in the area lead to draining of wetland and low-lying areas along the river to create usable agricultural and horticultural lands. To support these activities the Rangitaiki Land Drainage Act was passed in 1910. Once the Rangitaiki plains approximately 40,000 hectares of wetland was drained and converted to farmland. At the same time the existing dual discharges of the river towards the Whakatāne River to the east and the Tarawera River estuary to the west were replaced by the cutting of a channel near Thornton to provide a new direct outlet for the Rangitaiki to the sea. Within a day of the new outlet being opened in May 1914, the level of the Rangitaiki in the lower sections of the Rangitaiki Plains area dropped by approximately1.5 metres (4.9 ft). This fall of the river level encouraged further agricultural and horticultural development in this area following the end of World War I.

The development of flood control, mitigation schemes and drainage schemes was undertaken due to the requirements of the Land Drainage Act 1908, Soil Conservation and Rivers Control Act 1941, and specificity for the Rangitaiki catchment Rangitaiki Land Drainage Act 1910 and the Rangitāiki Land Drainage Act 1956. To assist in controlling floods settlements and productive land downstream of Te Teko is protected by a system of stopbanks (also known as floodbanks). These are designed to provide protection from a 1% Annual Exceedance Probability (AEP) flood (also known as the "100 year" flood).

In the later half of the 20th century, three hydro-electric schemes have been constructed along the river. The first of these was the Matahina Power Station. Commissioned in 1967, the associated 86 m (282 ft) high Matahina Dam impounded the river to create Lake Matahina. Due to the lake's limited storage capacity, the power station operates as a run of the river scheme. The power station can generate up to 80 MW.

The second was the Wheao and Flaxy Power Scheme, commissioned in 1980. Located in the Kaingaroa Forest this scheme diverts water from the Flaxy Creek, Rangitaiki and Wheao rivers to power the 24 MW Wheao and the 2.1 MW Flaxy Power Stations. Due to the scheme's limited storage capacity it operates as a run of the river scheme. The third, the Aniwhenua Power Station, was commissioned in 1981, above the Āniwaniwa Falls. Its associated 10 m (33 ft) high dam impounds the Rangitaiki River and Pokairoa Stream at their confluence at Black Road, Galatea, approximately 65 kilometres (40 mi) upstream from the river mouth to create Lake Āniwaniwa (unofficially known as Lake Aniwhenua). The lake supports a regionally significant trout fishery, as well as duck shooting and other recreation activities. Due to the lake's limited storage capacity the power station operates as a run of the river scheme. The power station can generate up to 25 MW.

In April 2017, remnants of Cyclone Debbie caused heavy rainfall in the region. At 8:30 am on 6 April, water from the Rangitaiki River breached the College Road floodwall at Edgecumbe, causing widespread flooding across the township. A state of emergency was declared for the Whakatane District, and around 2,000 people were evacuated to Kawerau and Whakatāne. More than 300 homes were damaged, with some becoming uninhabitable. A review of the flood was undertaken by a panel consisting of Sir Michael Cullen (chair), Kyle Christensen, and Charlie Price.

== Watershed ==
Prior to the completion of the Matahina Dam annual discharge figures for suspended and bed load sediment near the river mouth were about 201,000 and 188,000 tonne respectively, Since then the Matahina dam has acted as an effective barrier to the seaward movement of sediment by the Rangitaiki River, with equivalent post-dam values have dropped to 65,000 and 10,000 tonne. This trapping of sediment has halted or substantially reduced the downstream historical rising river bed and coastal progradation of the Rangitaiki plains.

Since the completion of the upstream Aniwhenua dam in 1982, it had become the principal sediment capture point though an increasing amount of sediment is being deposited in the deep portion of Lake Matahina. The river's condition is monitored at Murupara, Aniwhenua and Te Teko.

== Tributaries ==
Heading downstream from its source, major tributaries of the river include the Otamatea River, Wheao River, which joins the Rangitaiki upstream of Murupara, the Horomanga River, which joins the Rangitaiki 12 kilometres (7.5 mi) north of Murupara, and the Whirinaki River, which joins the Rangitaiki 3 kilometres (1.9 mi) north of Murupara. The Horomanga and Whirinaki rivers rise in the Ikawhenua Ranges, also contribute relatively large flood flows (and quantities of shingle) to the Rangitaiki. The Horomanga River has a catchment of 218 km (135 mi)^{2}, while the Whirinaki has a catchment of 527 km (327 mi).^{2} The Whirinaki River catchment is primarily composed of greywacke rock, with little absorption ability there is a resulting high runoff and so it consequently contributes relatively large flood flows (and quantities of shingle) to the Rangitaiki.

== Gallery ==
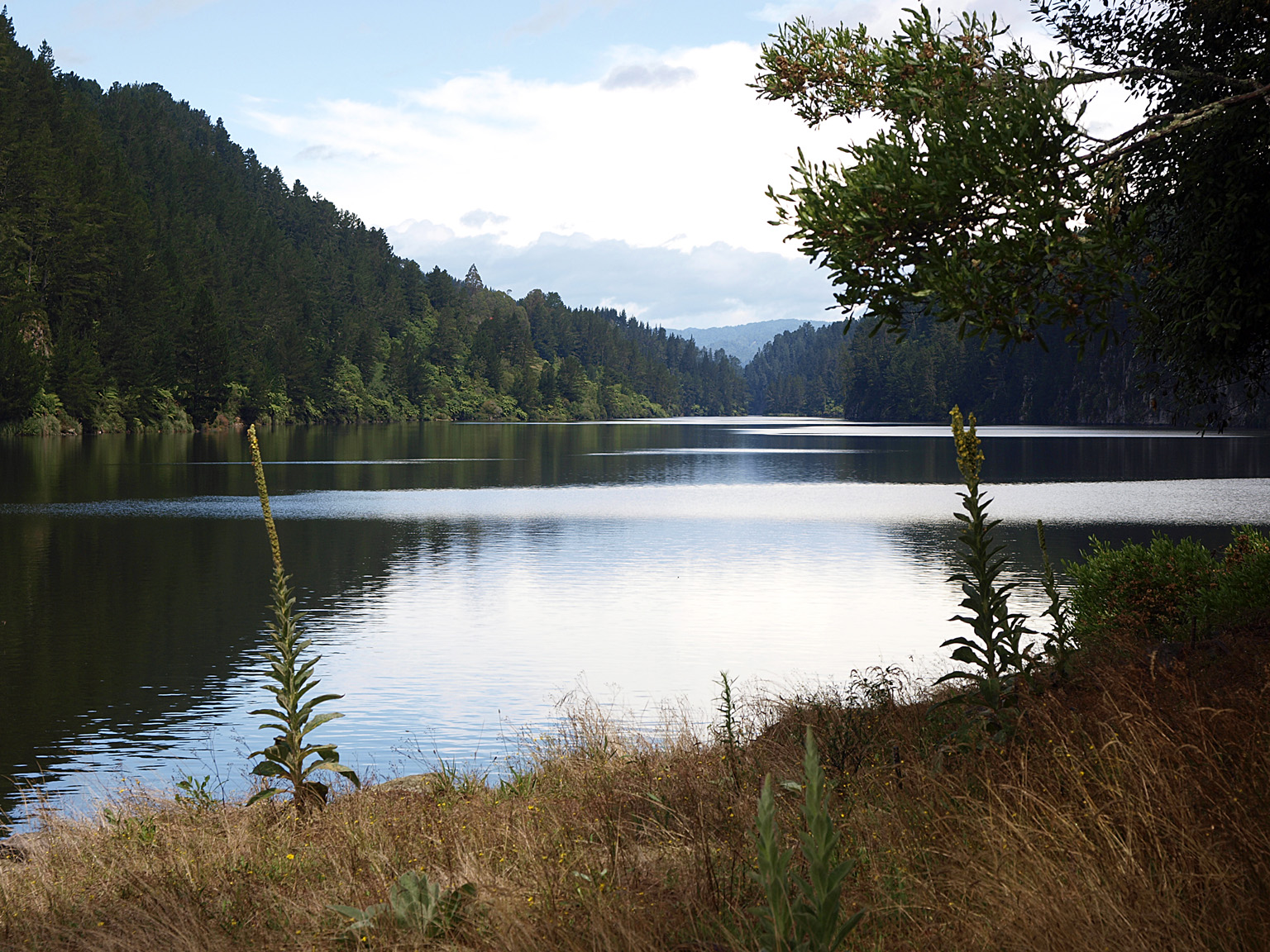
Lake Matahina

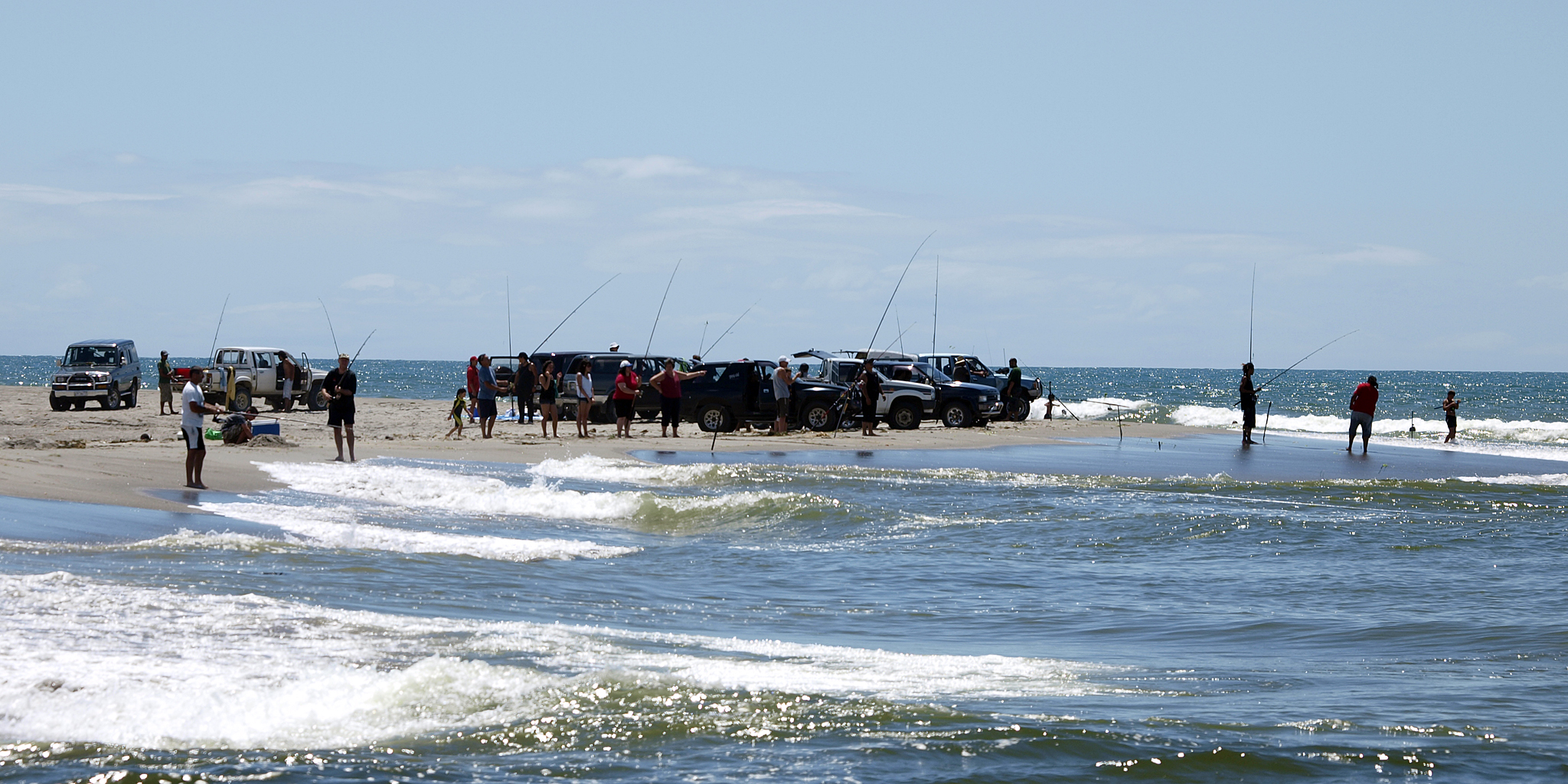
River fishing at Thornton

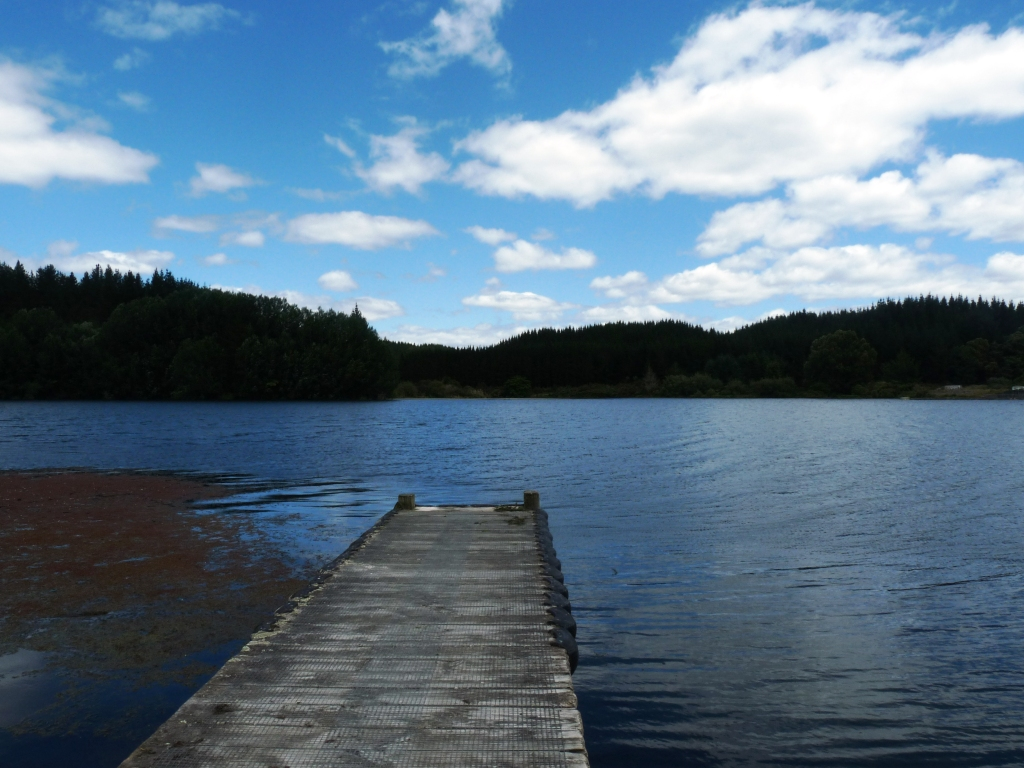
Lake Āniwaniwa

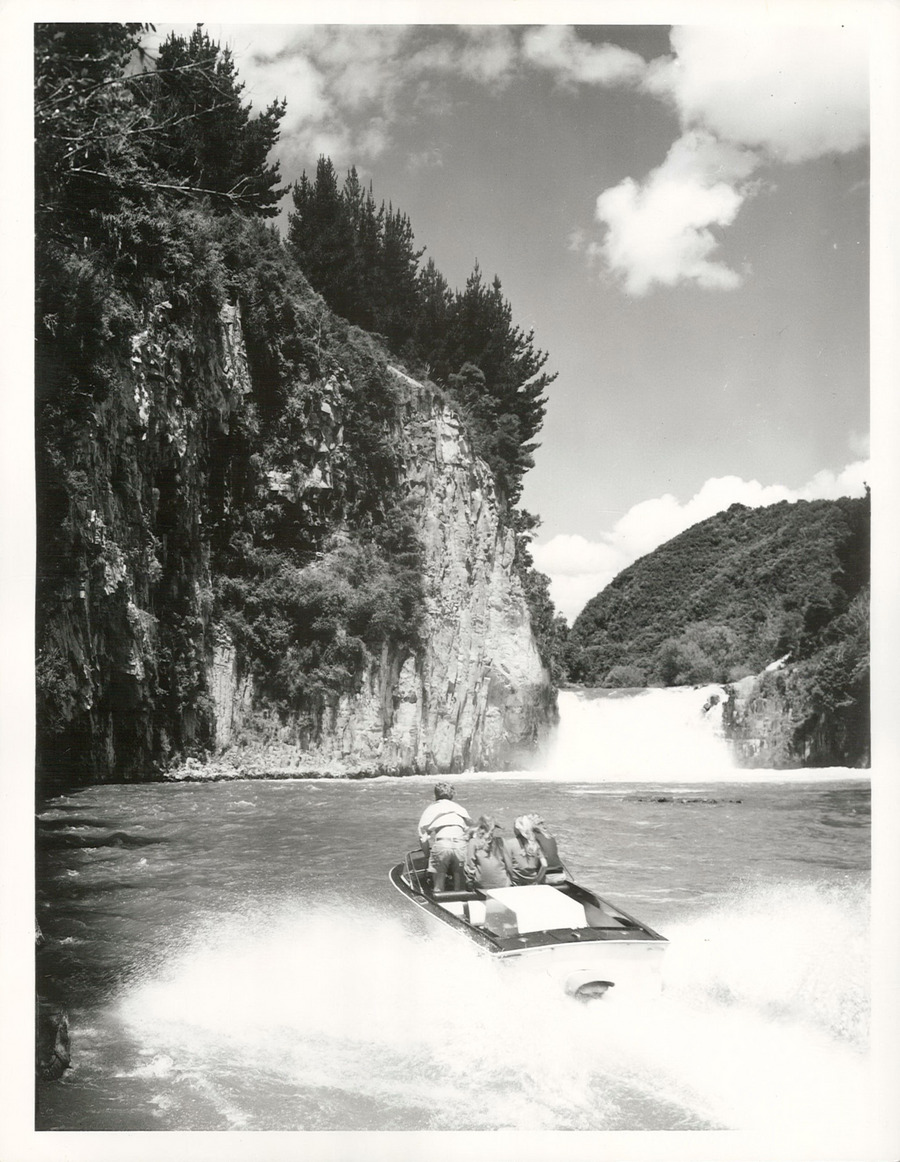
Recreational jet boating on the Rangitaiki River, 1971
