= Whakatāne District =

- Territorial authority district
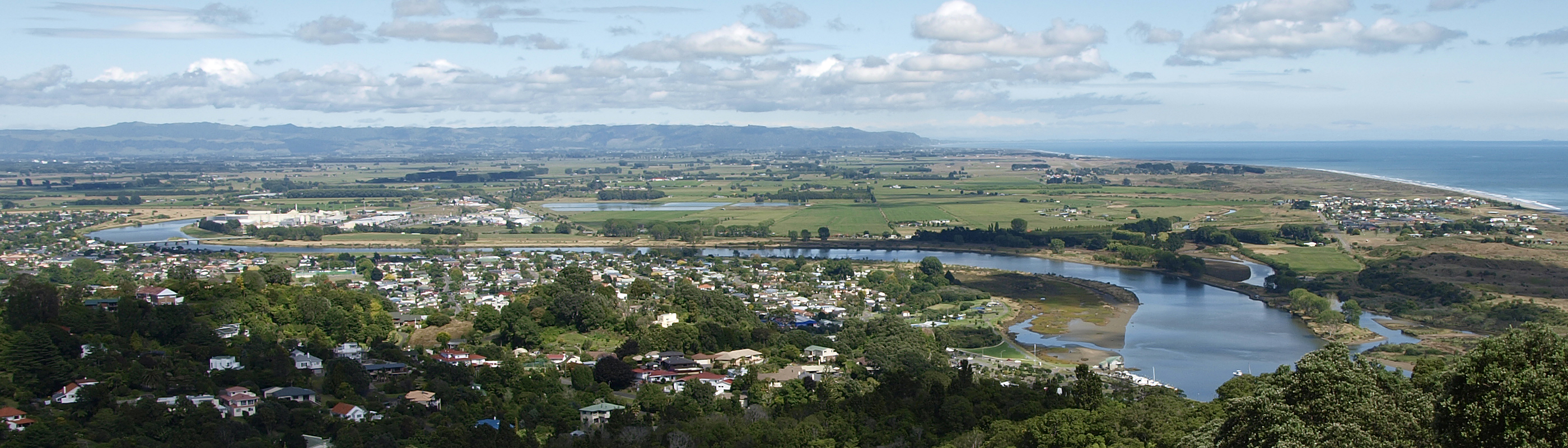

- Whakatāne district within the North Island
- Coordinates: 38°24′00″S 176°55′52″E
- Country: New Zealand
- Region: Bay of Plenty
- Wards: Whakatāne-Ōhope; Te Urewera; Rangitāiki; Rangitāiki (Māori); Toi ki Uta (Māori); Kapu te rangi (Māori)
- Seat: Whakatāne

Government
  - Mayor: Nándor Tánczos
  - Deputy Mayor: Vacant
  - Territorial authority: Whakatāne District Council

Area
  - Total: 4,465 km^{2} (1,724 sq mi)
  - Land: 4,449.71 km^{2} (1,718.04 sq mi)

Population (June 2025)
  - Total: 38,400
  - Density: 8.63/km^{2} (22.4/sq mi)
- Time zone: UTC+12 (NZST)
  - Summer (DST): UTC+13 (NZDT)
- Postcode(s): Map of postcodes
- Area code: 07
- Website: www.whakatane.com

Whakatāne District is a territorial authority district on the North Island of New Zealand. The Whakatāne District Council is headquartered in the largest town, Whakatāne. The district falls within the Bay of Plenty Region. Nándor Tánczos has been the mayor of Whakatāne since the 2025 local elections.

The district has an area of 4465 square kilometres, of which 4450 square kilometres are land. The population was 38,400 as of June 2025.

== History ==
A Whakatane County Council was established in 1876, and covered a wider area than the present district, including Ōpōtiki. Whakatane Road Board was established at the same time.

The county was split into Whakatane and Opotiki counties in 1900, and the Road Board was made part of Whakatane County. In 1913, the Whakatane Harbour Board was established, and in 1914, Whakatane Town became a separate entity from Whakatane County. The town became Whakatane Borough in 1917. Kawerau Town and Murupara Town District split in 1954 and 1955, and both became boroughs in 1962.

In 1976, Whakatane County, Whakatane Borough and Whakatane Harbour Board amalgamated to form Whakatane District. This expanded in 1989 by amalgamating with Murupara Borough, and taking parts of Opotiki and Taupo districts.

== Populated places ==
Whakatāne District consists of the following towns, localities, settlements and communities:

- Rangitaiki Ward (Note: Formerly known as Edgecumbe-Tarawera Ward until 2010.)
  - Awakaponga
  - Awakeri
  - Edgecumbe
  - Hauone
  - Manawahe
  - Matatā
  - Onepu
  - Otakiri
  - Otamarakau (east portion)
  - Pahou
  - Paroa
  - Pikowai
  - Poroporo
  - Taiwhakaea
  - Te Mahoe
  - Te Teko
  - Thornton
  - White Pine Bush
- Whakatāne-Ōhope Ward
  - Allandale
  - Coastlands
  - Hillcrest
  - Kohi Point
  - Maraetotara
  - Mokorua Bush
  - Ōhiwa Harbour
  - Ōhope Beach
  - Ōhope
  - Orini
  - Otarawairere
  - Piripai
  - Port Ōhope
  - Trident
  - Whakatāne
- Te Urewera Ward
  - Tāneatua-Waimana Community Board (Note: Formerly a general ward until 2022.)
    - Cheddar Valley
    - Hopeone
    - Kererutahi
    - Matahapa
    - Matahi
    - Nukuhou
    - Nukuhou North
    - Opouriao
    - Ōtāne
    - Paraoanui
    - Pekatahi
    - Raora Pa
    - Ruatoki
    - Ruatoki North
    - Tahora
    - Tanatana
    - Tāneatua
    - Tataiāhapi Pa
    - Tauwhare
    - Tauwharemanuka
    - Tāwhana
    - Te Urewera
    - Waikirikiri
    - Waimana
    - Waingarara
    - Wainui
    - Whakarae Pa
  - Galatea-Murupara Community Board
    - Galatea-Waiohau Subdivision
      - Galatea
      - Horomanga
      - Kaingaroa Forest (east portion)
      - Kopuriki
      - Matahina
      - Waiohau
      - Wairapukao
    - Te Urewera Subdivision
      - Heipipi
      - Mātatua
      - Maungapohatu
      - Minginui
      - Ngaputahi
      - Ōhāua
      - Pāpueru
      - Ruatāhuna
      - Te Waiiti
      - Te Whaiti
    - Murupara Subdivision
      - Murupara

== Demographics ==
Whakatāne District covers 4,449.71 km^{2} (1,718.04 sq mi) and had an estimated population of 38,400 as of June 2025, with a population density of 8.6 people per km^{2}.

Historical population
Year	Pop.	±% p.a.
2006	33,300	—
2013	32,691	−0.26%
2018	35,700	+1.78%
2023	37,149	+0.80%

Whakatāne District had a population of 37,149 in the 2023 New Zealand census, an increase of 1,449 people (4.1%) since the 2018 census, and an increase of 4,458 people (13.6%) since the 2013 census. There were 18,210 males, 18,852 females and 84 people of other genders in 13,185 dwellings. 1.8% of people identified as LGBTIQ+. The median age was 40.2 years (compared with 38.1 years nationally). There were 7,776 people (20.9%) aged under 15 years, 6,324 (17.0%) aged 15 to 29, 15,837 (42.6%) aged 30 to 64, and 7,218 (19.4%) aged 65 or older.

People could identify as more than one ethnicity. The results were 62.3% European (Pākehā); 48.6% Māori; 3.9% Pasifika; 4.3% Asian; 0.5% Middle Eastern, Latin American and African New Zealanders (MELAA); and 2.1% other, which includes people giving their ethnicity as "New Zealander". English was spoken by 96.2%, Māori language by 17.5%, Samoan by 0.2% and other languages by 5.5%. No language could be spoken by 2.2% (e.g. too young to talk). New Zealand Sign Language was known by 0.5%. The percentage of people born overseas was 12.8, compared with 28.8% nationally.

Religious affiliations were 29.3% Christian, 0.4% Hindu, 0.2% Islam, 9.1% Māori religious beliefs, 0.4% Buddhist, 0.4% New Age, and 1.2% other religions. People who answered that they had no religion were 52.2%, and 7.5% of people did not answer the census question.

Of those at least 15 years old, 3,861 (13.1%) people had a bachelor's or higher degree, 16,800 (57.2%) had a post-high school certificate or diploma, and 7,572 (25.8%) people exclusively held high school qualifications. The median income was $35,600, compared with $41,500 nationally. 2,463 people (8.4%) earned over $100,000 compared to 12.1% nationally. The employment status of those at least 15 was that 13,185 (44.9%) people were employed full-time, 4,275 (14.6%) were part-time, and 1,365 (4.6%) were unemployed.

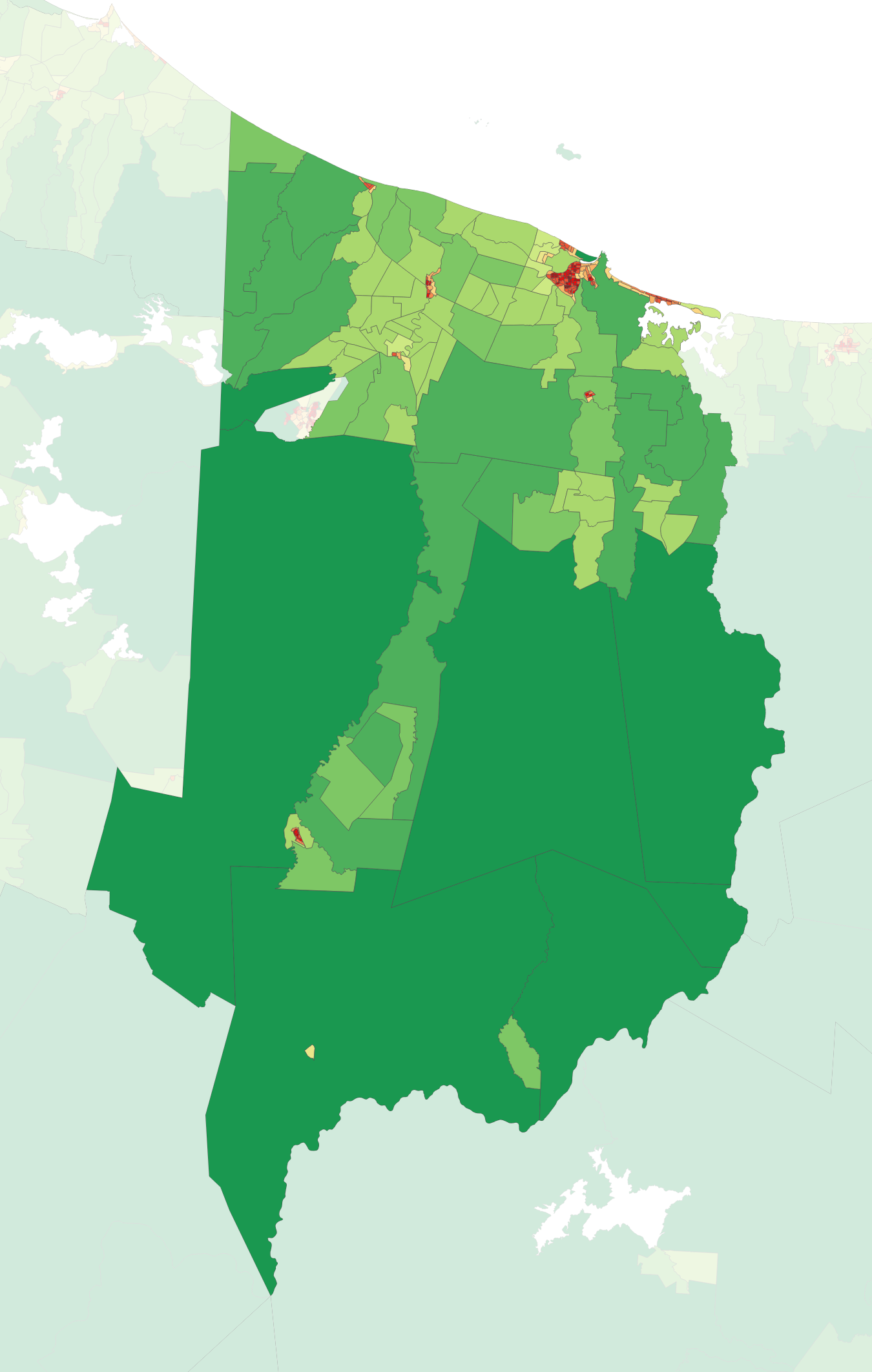
Population density in the 2023 census

Individual wards
Name	Area (km^{2})	Population	Density (per km^{2})	Dwellings	Median age	Median income
Rangitāiki General Ward	631.90	9,864	15.6	3,318	39.5 years	$38,100
Whakatāne-Ōhope General Ward	56.91	19,359	340.2	7,461	43.2 years	$36,300
Te Urewera General Ward	3,760.90	7,923	2.1	2,403	34.1 years	$30,700
New Zealand					38.1 years	$41,500

== Sister cities ==
- Kamagaya, Chiba, Japan (since 1997)
- Warwick, Queensland, Australia (since 1994)

Whakatāne has a friendship agreement with Shibukawa, Gunma, Japan.
