= Whirinaki River (Bay of Plenty) =

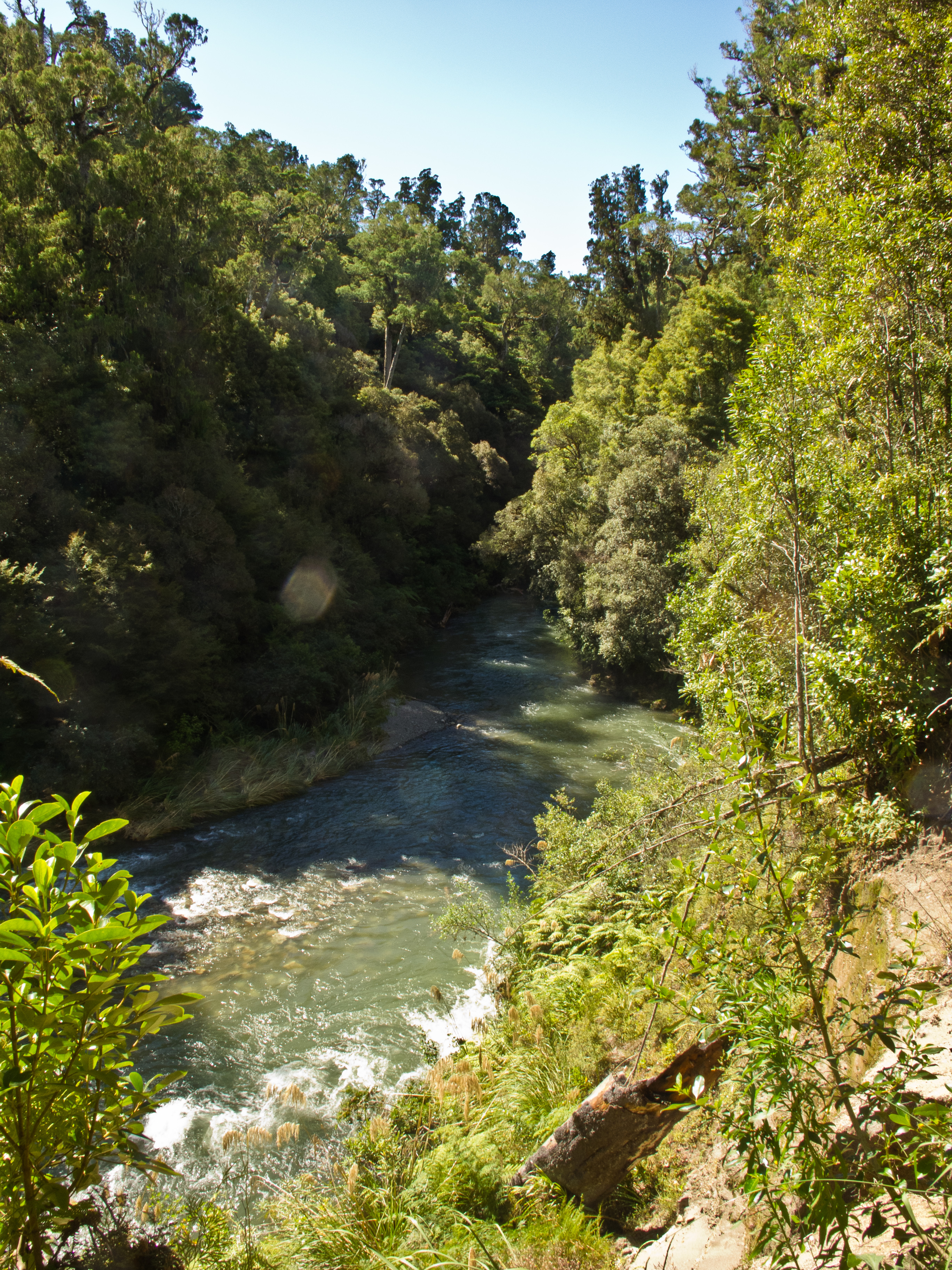
- Route of the Whirinaki River
- Mouth of the Whirinaki River Whirinaki River (Bay of Plenty) (North Island)

Location
- Country: New Zealand

Physical characteristics
- Source
  - coordinates: 38°49′31″S 176°42′02″E
- Mouth
  - location: Rangitaiki River
  - coordinates: 38°26′14″S 176°42′18″E
- Length: 46 km (29 mi)

Basin features
- Progression: Whirinaki River → Rangitaiki River → Bay of Plenty
- Tributaries
  - left: Te Kohu Stream, Otaika Stream, Te Tehi Stream, Waiatiu Stream, Waiakaka Stream, Paripahekeheke Stream, Upper Okahu Stream, Rautahi Stream, Waione Stream, Waikotikoti Stream, Kopikopiko Stream, Hukanui Stream, Rorokuri Stream, Tuwhare Stream, Korokio Stream, Paeoutu Stream, Ariki Tuhoe Stream, Mangawiri Stream
  - right: Taumutu Stream, Kakanui Stream, Mangatata Stream, Upper Mangamate Stream, Otamaariki Stream, Kakiraoa Stream, Minginui Stream, Poiatangata Stream, Tunakapakapa Stream, Hauwai Stream, Kaitane Stream, Whataroa Stream, Tauwharekopua Stream, Te Tutiri Stream, Tutaengaro Stream, Wharekaikereru Stream, Okahu Stream, Raratuna Stream, Mangakirikiri Stream, Kaikope Stream, Mangakino Stream, Whakaruaki Stream, Maraetahia Stream, Hangarau Stream
- Waterfalls: Whirinaki Falls, Whirinaki Forest Iconic Waterfall, Mangamate Waterfall

The Whirinaki River is a river of the Hawke's Bay and Bay of Plenty Regions of New Zealand's North Island. It flows generally north through the Whirinaki Te Pua-a-Tāne Conservation Park and Kaingaroa Forest to reach the Rangitaiki River 3 kilometres (2 mi) north of Murupara.

== See also ==
- List of rivers of New Zealand
