= Murupara =

Town in the Bay of Plenty Region, New Zealand

- Minor urban area
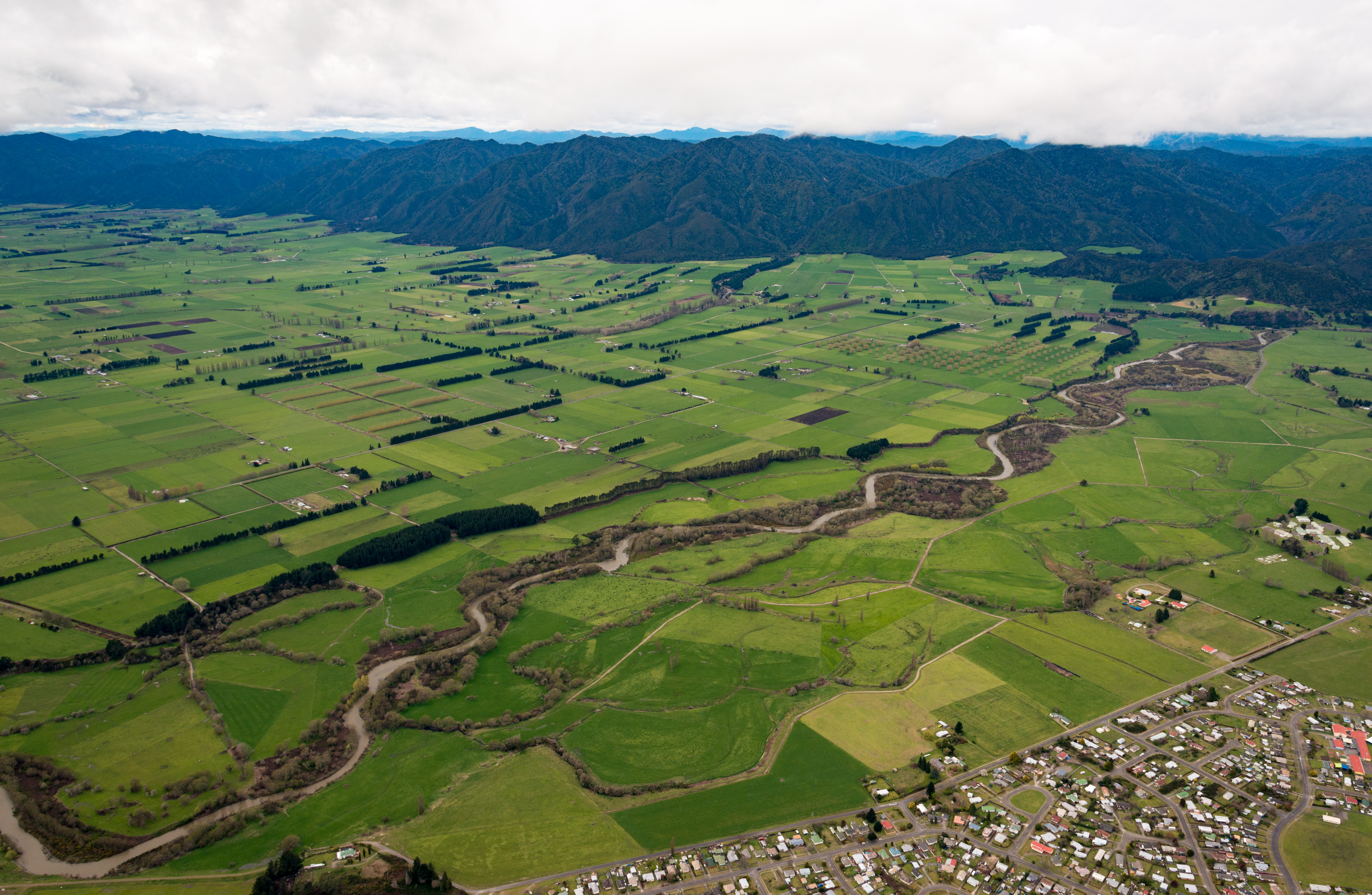
- View eastward from Murupara over the Whirinaki River and Galatea Plains toward the Ikawhenua Range
- Interactive map of Murupara
- Coordinates: 38°28′S 176°42′E
- Country: New Zealand
- Region: Bay of Plenty
- Territorial authority: Whakatāne District
- Ward: Te Urewera General Ward
- Community: Murupara Community
- Electorates: East Cape; Waiariki (Māori)

Government
  - Territorial authority: Whakatāne District Council
  - Regional council: Bay of Plenty Regional Council
  - Mayor of Whakatāne: Nándor Tánczos
  - East Cape MP: Dana Kirkpatrick
  - Waiariki MP: Rawiri Waititi

Area
  - Total: 6.26 km^{2} (2.42 sq mi)

Population (June 2025)
  - Total: 1,910
  - Density: 305/km^{2} (790/sq mi)
- Postcode(s): 3025

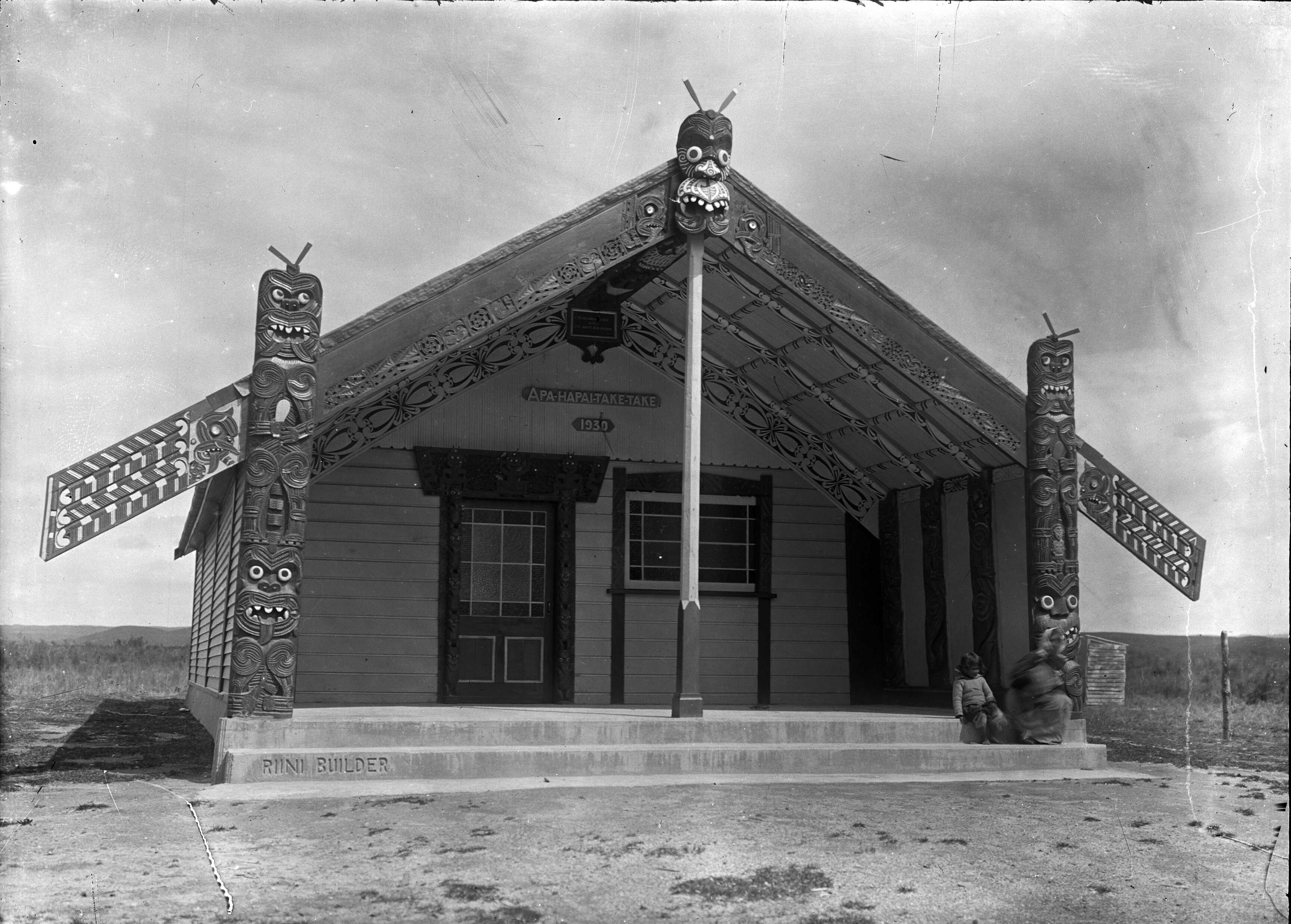
Apa Hapai Taketake meeting house at Murupara, ca. 1940

Murupara is a town in the Whakatāne District and Bay of Plenty Region of New Zealand's North Island. The town is in an isolated part of the region between the Kaingaroa Forest and Te Urewera protected area, on the banks of the Rangitaiki River, 65 kilometres southeast of Rotorua. Indigenous Māori make up over 90% of the population.

It is on SH38 and is the terminus of the Murupara Railway Branch. The town's principal industries are all related to forestry.

Murupara is in the rohe (tribal area) of the Ngāti Manawa iwi.

The Māori language name Murupara means "to wipe off mud".

== History and culture ==
=== History ===
Murupara was previously a staging post on the road between Rotorua and Napier. In the early 1900s, the planting of exotic trees began on the surrounding scrubland. This area is now known as the Kaingaroa Forest, with 1,400 square kilometres of planted pines. As the main service centre for the many forestry workers and their families, Murupara grew to a population of over 3,000. Recent changes to the forestry contracting system have brought about a decrease in the number of permanent residents.

The settlements of Galatea, Horomanga, Kopuriki, Aniwhenua, Waiohau and Murupara lie between the boundary of the Kaingaroa Forest, the popular Te Urewera and Whirinaki Te Pua-a-Tāne Conservation Park. Earlier history is also evident around Murupara. In a rock shelter approximately eight kilometres west of the town centre are a number of early Māori rock carvings.

Murupara was regarded as being a "gang town" but local iwi have placed a rāhui (ban) on gang patches from being worn at the local marae and school.

=== Marae ===
Murupara has four marae, which are meeting places for Ngāti Manawa hapū:

- Moewhare or Karangaranga marae and Moewhare meeting house are affiliated with Moewhare.
- Painoaiho marae and Ruatapu meeting house are affiliated with Ngāti Koro.
- Rangitahi marae and Apa Hapai Taketake meeting house are affiliated with Ngāti Hui.
- Tīpapa marae and Tangiharuru meeting house are affiliated with Ngāi Tokowaru.

In October 2020, the Government committed $1,327,283 from the Provincial Growth Fund to upgrade the four marae, creating 12 jobs.

== Demographics ==
Stats NZ describes Murupara as a small urban area, which covers 6.26 km^{2} (2.42 sq mi). It had an estimated population of 1,910 as of June 2025, with a population density of 305 people per km^{2}.

Historical population
Year	Pop.	±% p.a.
2006	1,872	—
2013	1,671	−1.61%
2018	1,815	+1.67%
2023	1,884	+0.75%

Murupara had a population of 1,884 in the 2023 New Zealand census, an increase of 69 people (3.8%) since the 2018 census, and an increase of 213 people (12.7%) since the 2013 census. There were 936 males, 939 females, and 9 people of other genders in 579 dwellings. 1.4% of people identified as LGBTIQ+. The median age was 32.8 years (compared with 38.1 years nationally). There were 450 people (23.9%) aged under 15 years, 432 (22.9%) aged 15 to 29, 783 (41.6%) aged 30 to 64, and 216 (11.5%) aged 65 or older.

People could identify as more than one ethnicity. The results were 25.0% European (Pākehā); 89.8% Māori; 4.1% Pasifika; 0.8% Asian; 0.2% Middle Eastern, Latin American and African New Zealanders (MELAA); and 1.3% other, which includes people giving their ethnicity as "New Zealander". English was spoken by 95.5%, Māori by 31.7%, Samoan by 0.5%, and other languages by 1.8%. No language could be spoken by 2.2% (e.g. too young to talk). New Zealand Sign Language was known by 1.1%. The percentage of people born overseas was 2.1, compared with 28.8% nationally.

Religious affiliations were 36.1% Christian, 0.2% Islam, 11.5% Māori religious beliefs, 0.6% Buddhist, 0.3% New Age, and 0.5% other religions. People who answered that they had no religion were 44.7%, and 7.3% of people did not answer the census question.

Of those at least 15 years old, 84 (5.9%) people had a bachelor's or higher degree, 840 (58.6%) had a post-high school certificate or diploma, and 510 (35.6%) people exclusively held high school qualifications. The median income was $27,700, compared with $41,500 nationally. 27 people (1.9%) earned over $100,000 compared to 12.1% nationally. The employment status of those at least 15 was 480 (33.5%) full-time, 189 (13.2%) part-time, and 174 (12.1%) unemployed.

== Education ==
Murupara Area School is a co-educational state area school for Year 1 to 13 students, with a roll of 164 as of July 2026. It opened in 2013, when the local primary and secondary schools merged.

Te Kura Kaupapa Motuhake o Tāwhiuau is a co-educational state Māori language immersion school, with a roll of 90. The school opened in 2000, and was the first Designated Character School (Kura ā-Iwi) in the country.

== Climate ==
Climate data for Murupara (1973–1987)
Month	Jan	Feb	Mar	Apr	May	Jun	Jul	Aug	Sep	Oct	Nov	Dec	Year
Record high °C (°F)	34.0 (93.2)	33.0 (91.4)	30.0 (86.0)	26.0 (78.8)	20.9 (69.6)	19.0 (66.2)	17.5 (63.5)	18.1 (64.6)	25.7 (78.3)	26.0 (78.8)	28.7 (83.7)	29.7 (85.5)	34.0 (93.2)
Mean maximum °C (°F)	30.8 (87.4)	30.1 (86.2)	26.8 (80.2)	23.1 (73.6)	18.9 (66.0)	16.7 (62.1)	15.8 (60.4)	17.0 (62.6)	20.0 (68.0)	23.2 (73.8)	26.5 (79.7)	28.0 (82.4)	31.3 (88.3)
Mean daily maximum °C (°F)	24.9 (76.8)	24.7 (76.5)	22.4 (72.3)	19.2 (66.6)	15.4 (59.7)	12.9 (55.2)	12.4 (54.3)	13.7 (56.7)	15.7 (60.3)	18.2 (64.8)	20.8 (69.4)	22.9 (73.2)	18.6 (65.5)
Daily mean °C (°F)	18.4 (65.1)	18.5 (65.3)	16.5 (61.7)	13.1 (55.6)	9.3 (48.7)	7.5 (45.5)	6.8 (44.2)	8.1 (46.6)	10.0 (50.0)	12.5 (54.5)	14.8 (58.6)	16.9 (62.4)	12.7 (54.9)
Mean daily minimum °C (°F)	11.9 (53.4)	12.2 (54.0)	10.5 (50.9)	7.0 (44.6)	3.2 (37.8)	2.1 (35.8)	1.1 (34.0)	2.4 (36.3)	4.3 (39.7)	6.8 (44.2)	8.7 (47.7)	10.9 (51.6)	6.8 (44.2)
Mean minimum °C (°F)	5.5 (41.9)	6.0 (42.8)	2.2 (36.0)	−0.2 (31.6)	−2.8 (27.0)	−4.5 (23.9)	−4.6 (23.7)	−3.6 (25.5)	−1.6 (29.1)	−0.2 (31.6)	1.0 (33.8)	4.5 (40.1)	−5.3 (22.5)
Record low °C (°F)	1.7 (35.1)	1.2 (34.2)	−4.3 (24.3)	−3.0 (26.6)	−4.8 (23.4)	−6.3 (20.7)	−5.7 (21.7)	−4.8 (23.4)	−2.7 (27.1)	−2.5 (27.5)	−1.6 (29.1)	2.0 (35.6)	−6.3 (20.7)
Average rainfall mm (inches)	91.1 (3.59)	81.3 (3.20)	111.1 (4.37)	106.8 (4.20)	102.7 (4.04)	112.9 (4.44)	101.3 (3.99)	109.9 (4.33)	101.7 (4.00)	99.3 (3.91)	82.2 (3.24)	125.1 (4.93)	1,225.4 (48.24)
Source: Earth Sciences NZ (rainfall 1971–2000)

== Notable people ==
- Jacinda Ardern, former Prime Minister of New Zealand and leader of the Labour Party (2017–2023)
- Pem Bird, former president of the Te Pāti Māori (2010–2013)
- Bradley Iles, professional golfer
- Percy Marunui Murphy, former borough mayor, first Māori mayor in the country
- Willie Ripia, rugby union player
