= 1978 Florida state elections =

== Governor and lieutenant governor ==
Seven tickets ran for the Democratic nomination for governor of Florida. Jim Williams, the lieutenant governor, ran for governor with former state Senator Betty Castor of Florida, as his running mate. Hans Tanzler, the mayor of Jacksonville, ran with Manuel "Manolo" Arques, a Cuban-American real estate and insurance executive from Miami. State Secretary of State Bruce Smathers (who resigned to run) ran with state Representative Charles W. Boyd.

Claude R. Kirk, Jr. of Palm Beach, who was the Republican governor of Florida from 1967 to 1971, returned to the party he left 28 years prior, switching his party affiliation to Democratic on July 5, 1978 (the month prior to re-registering as an independent and launching an abortive signature drive to get on the ballot as an independent. He chose as his running mate Mary Singleton, the former director of the state Division of Elections and the first black woman to sit on the Jacksonville City Council.

General election

- Bob Graham/Wayne Mixson (DEM) - 1,406,580 (55.59%)
- Jack Eckerd/Paula Hawkins (REP) - 1,123,888 (44.41%)

== Attorney general ==
Democratic primary

- Alan Becker - 232,416 (26.7%)
- Barry Richard - 231,518 (26.6%)
- Jim Smith - 407,579 (46.8%)

Democratic primary runoff

- Alan Becker - 329,455 (39.9%)
- Jim Smith - 497,255 (60.1%)

== Secretary of state ==
Democratic primary

- Beverly F. Dozier - 224,990 (25.4%)
- Jim Fair - 81,389 (9.2%)
- George Firestone - 253,395 (28.7%)
- Joe Little - 103,275 (11.7%)
- Richard "Dick" Renick - 221,022 (25.0%)

Democratic primary runoff

- Beverly F. Dozier - 342,661 (42.1%)
- George Firestone - 472,072 (57.9%)

General election

- George Firestone (DEM) - 1,278,658 (55.0%)
- Ander Crenshaw (REP) - 1,045,703 (45.0%)

== Comptroller ==
Democratic primary

- Don Dansby - 159,238 (18.7%)
- Gerald (Jerry) Lewis - 691,583 (81.3%)

== Treasurer ==
Democratic primary

- Bill Gunter - 735,523 (80.1%)
- Don Hazelton - 182,907 (19.9%)

General election

- Bill Gunter (DEM) - 1,758,435 (74.8%)
- Jeffrey L. Latham (REP) - 591,730 (25.2%)

== Commissioner of Education ==
- Ralph Turlington (DEM) - 1,436,240 (63.9%)
- Herman B. Williams (REP) - 811,770 (36.1%)

== United States House of Representatives ==
=== 1st congressional district ===
Democratic primary - Runoff Indicated

- Curtis Golden - 29,692 (31.4%)
- Earl Hutto - 39,982 (42.3%)
- Jerry Melvin - 21,186 (22.4%)
- Lewis H. "Ike" Williams - 3,687 (3.9%)

Democratic primary runoff

- Curtis Golden - 35,721 (38.0%)
- Earl Hutto - 58,352 (62.0%)

General election

- Earl Hutto (DEM) - 85,608 (63.3%)
- Warren Briggs (REP) - 49,715 (36.7%)

=== 2nd congressional district ===
Democratic primary

- Don Fuqua - 83,308 (85.5%)
- Anthony P. (Tony) Wesolowski - 14,081 (14.5%)

General election

- Don Fuqua (DEM) - 112,649 (81.7%)
- Pete Brathwaite (REP) - 25,148 (18.3%)

=== 4th congressional district ===
- Bill Chappell (DEM) - 113,302 (73.1%)
- Tom Boney (REP) - 41,647 (26.9%)

=== 5th congressional district ===
Democratic primary - Runoff Indicated

- Adrian Bell, Jr. - 12,942 (20.8%)
- David Best - 21,410 (34.5%)
- Mike Olson - 18,805 (30.3%)
- Don Poindexter - 8,981 (14.5%)

Democratic primary runoff

- David Best - 32,573 (56.6%)
- Mike Olson - 24,945 (43.4%)

General election

- David Best (DEM) - 101,867 (48.9%)
- Richard Kelly (REP) - 106,319 (51.1%)

=== 6th congressional district ===
- Jim Christison (DEM) - 40,654 (21.2%)
- C. W. Bill Young (REP) - 150,694 (78.8%)

=== 7th congressional district ===
Democratic primary

- Sam M. Gibbons - 49,766 (69.1%)
- Don Gore - 1,928 (2.7%)
- Richard Salem - 20,338 (28.2%)

=== 9th congressional district ===
Democratic primary

- Bill Nelson - 36,565 (86.0%)
- Curtis R. Sears - 5,955 (14.0%)

Republican primary

- Frank Daley - 10,417 (29.5%)
- Edward Gurney - 24,844 (70.5%)

General election'

- Bill Nelson (DEM) - 89,543 (61.5%)
- Edward J. Gurney (REP) - 56,074 (38.5%)

=== 11th congressional district ===
Democratic primary

- John J. Considine - 20,689 (31.4%)
- Robert E. Lockwood - 9,286 (14.1%)
- Dan Mica - 35,947 (54.5%)

General election

- Dan Mica (DEM) - 123,346 (55.3%)
- Bill James (REP) - 99,757 (44.7%)

=== 12th congressional district ===
Democratic primary - Runoff Indicated

- John Adams - 17,955 (30.6%)
- Edward "Ed" J. Stack - 27,923 (47.6%)
- Gerald F. "Jerry" Thompson - 12,812 (21.8%)

Democratic primary runoff'

- John Adams - 22,816 (46.8%)
- Edward "Ed" J. Stack - 25,985 (53.2%)

Republican primary

- J. Herbert Burke - 16,675 (58.3%)
- Anthony Lewis Campenni - 11,903 (41.7%)

General election

- Edward "Ed" J. Stack (DEM) - 25,985 (53.2%)
- J. Herbert Burke (REP) - 66,610 (61.6%)

=== 14th congressional district ===
Democratic primary

- Marcus Ambrose - 2,901 (7.4%)
- Sam Brenner - 4,513 (11.6%)
- Claude Pepper - 31,597 (81.0%)

Republican primary

- Al Cardenas - 7,390 (80.0%)
- Evelio S. Estrella - 1,847 (20.0%)

General election

- Claude Pepper (DEM) - 65,202 (63.1%)
- Al Cardenas (REP) - 38,081 (36.9%)

=== 15th congressional district ===
- Dante B. Fascell (DEM) - 108,837 (74.2%)
- Herbert J. Hoodwin (REP) - 37,897 (25.8%)

== State senate ==
District 2

- Edmond M. "Ed" Fortune (DEM) - 45,645 (47.3%)
- Tom Tobiassen (REP) - 50,791 (52.7%)

District 11

- A. H. "Gus" Craig (DEM) - 28,886 (47.1%)
- Vince Fechtel, Jr. (REP) - 32,388 (52.9%)

District 14

- George Stuart, Jr. (DEM) - 60,407 (63.3%)
- Johnny Bremer (REP) - 35,024 (36.7%)

District 16

- Bill Beck (DEM) - 50,928 (43.2%)
- Clark Maxwell, Jr. (REP) - 67,051 (56.8%)

District 18

- Beverly Roberts (DEM) - 93,629 (42.1%)
- John T. Ware (REP) - 128,870 (57.9%)

District 20

- T. F. "Tom" Thompson (DEM) - 76,592 (34.0%)
- Mary Grizzle (REP) - 148,389 (66.0%)

District 23

- Pat Frank (DEM) - 91,746 (62.6%)
- David Ray (REP) - 54,727 (37.4%)

District 24

- Patrick K. "Pat" Neal (DEM) - 35,896 (52.7%)
- Andrew Jackson (REP) - 32,242 (47.3%)

District 36

- Harry A. Johnston, II (DEM) - 123,133 (56.6%)
- William Samuel "Bill" Riker (REP) - 94,533 (43.4%)

District 28

- Don Childers (DEM) - 140,857 (66.7%)
- B. E. "Billie" Brooks (REP) - 70,243 (33.3%)

District 30

- Marcia Beach (DEM) - 104,168 (43.1%)
- Van Poole (REP) - 137,570 (56.9%)

District 32

- Ken Jenne (DEM) - 43,798 (74.2%)
- Ernette Haring (REP) - 15,231 (25.8%)

District 36

- Paul B. Steinberg (DEM) - 100,626 (80.7%)
- L. D. G. (Lou) O'Hara (REP) - 23,991 (19.3%)

District 38

- Bob McKnight (DEM) - 88,099 (60.0%)
- Don J. Gruber (REP) - 58,742 (40.0%)

District 40

- Dick Anderson (DEM) - 106,143 (71.2%)
- Larry Wicks (REP) - 42,960 (28.8%)

== State House ==
District 2 Democratic primary

- Fermon Minshew - 9,364 (39.5%)
- Tom Patterson - 14,365 (60.5%)

District 3 Democratic primary

- Clyde H. (Jack) Hagler - 16,006 (63.0%)
- Jack Kenney - 9,410 (37.0%)

District 3

- Clyde H. (Jack) Hagler (DEM) - 30,676 (76.2%)
- Charles E. Frederickson (REP) - 9,573 (23.8%)

District 4 Democratic primary

- Jim Harkins - 6,900 (21.0%)
- Bolley "Bo" Johnson - 10,974 (33.3%)
- David Neal - 8,560 (26.0%)
- Lynn Toney - 6,498 (19.7%)

District 4 Democratic runoff

- Bolley "Bo" Johnson - 18,407 (56.1%)
- David Neal - 14,410 (43.9%)

District 5 Democratic primary

- Ken Boles - 7,820 (24.4%)
- Olivia S. Elmore - 6,404 (20.0%)
- Peter R. Gindl - 6,900 (21.5%)
- Mike Jones - 6,657 (20.8%)
- Mac McDaniels - 4,275 (13.3%)

District 5 Democratic runoff

- Ken Boles - 19,972 (62.0%)
- Peter R. Grindl - 12,250 (38.0%)

District 5

- Ken Boles (DEM) - 29,646 (58.6%)
- Jack Gardner (REP) - 20,910 (41.4%)

District 6

- James G. Ward (DEM) - 35,815 (70.9%)
- John C. Franklin Jr. (REP) - 14,673 (29.1%)

District 8

- Ron Johnson (DEM) - 11,073 (59.1%)
- Rick Seltzer (REP) - 7,674 (40.9%)

District 19

- Andrew E. (Andy) Johnson (DEM) - 38,712 (69.4%)
- Janis Betz Lampe (REP) - 17,068 (30.6%)

District 23

- Ronnie Bloom (DEM) - 26,582 (43.9%)
- Fred Tygart (REP) - 33,983 (56.1%)

District 24

- Buck Cochran (DEM) - 28,107 (47.5%)
- William "Bill" Bankhead (REP) - 31,082 (52.5%)

District 25

- Frank Williams (DEM) - 12,737 (60.9%)
- Howard Dunn (REP) - 8,167 (39.1%)

District 26

- Sidney Martin (DEM) - 25,948 (79.6%)
- David Liberman (REP) - 6,645 (20.4%)

District 28

- Hamilton Upchurch (DEM) - 12,739 (65.8%)
- Pat Malone (REP) - 6,616 (34.2%)

District 33

- Bob Hattaway (DEM) - 11,696 (59.0%)
- Jean E. Doyle (REP) - 8,130 (41.0%)

District 34

- Charles Joseph Knowles (DEM) - 10,654 (42.0%)
- Bobby Brantley (REP) - 14,713 (58.0%)

District 35

- Everett Kelly (DEM) - 12,273 (54.2%)
- J. M. (Jim) Hoskinson (REP) - 10,353 (45.8%)

District 38

- Bob Wattles (DEM) - 42,584 (48.4%)
- Lawrence R. "Larry" Kirkwood (REP) - 45,410 (51.6%)

District 39

- Fred Turner (DEM) - 33,427 (38.1%)
- John L. Mica (REP) - 54,422 (61.9%)

District 40

- Terry Hadley (DEM) - 43,275 (49.6%)
- Richard Crotty (REP) - 43,934 (50.4%)

District 41

- Fran Carlton (DEM) - 48,651 (53.7%)
- Jim Huckeba (REP) - 41,988 (46.3%)

District 42

- Suzanne Campbell (DEM) - 34,133 (38.9%)
- Toni Jennings (REP) - 53,575 (61.1%)

District 43

- Dick J. Batchelor (DEM) - 62,277 (69.2%)
- Robert N. Webster (REP) - 27,672 (30.8%)

District 44

- David L. Barrett (DEM) - 39,594 (56.9%)
- Craig A. Brosius (REP) - 29,945 (43.1%)

District 45

- Winston Gardner (DEM) - 36,139 (51.4%)
- John Moore (REP) - 34,148 (48.6%)

District 46

- Phil Austin (DEM) - 21,389 (30.0%)
- Marilyn Evans-Jones (REP) - 49,858 (70.0%)

District 47

- Hartzel "Bud" Jennings (DEM) - 25,867 (36.4%)
- Tim Deratany (REP) - 31,576 (44.4%)
- Glenn A. Blanchard - 13,717 (19.3%)

District 53

- Michael "Mike" Tagarelli (DEM) - 38,743 (35.4%)
- Peter Dunbar (REP) - 70,585 (64.6%)

District 55

- Tom R. Moore (DEM) - 53,344 (47.8%)
- Jim Smith (REP) - 58,148 (52.2%)

District 57

- Rick Escarraz (DEM) - 45,807 (42.7%)
- Dennis Jones (REP) - 61,351 (57.3%)

District 58

- Kent G. Whittemore (DEM) - 40,566 (39.0%)
- George Hieber (REP) - 63,576 (61.0%)

District 59

- Eddie Mills (DEM) - 50,394 (47.7%)
- Bob Melby (REP) - 55,193 (52.3%)

District 61

- Don O'Leary (DEM) - 45,932 (42.4%)
- Dorothy Eaton Sample (REP) - 62,401 (57.6%)

District 62

- Carl Carpenter, Jr. (DEM) - 45,984 (62.1%)
- Allan R. Stone (REP) - 28,090 (37.9%)

District 65

- Jim Foster (DEM) - 38,450 (51.1%)
- John Grant (REP) - 36,811 (48.9%)
- District 72
- Larry Shackelford (DEM) - 28,399 (60.6%)
- Barbara Shepherd (REP) - 18,467 (39.4%)

District 73

- Clyde C. Council (DEM) - 18,547 (34.1%)
- Thomas E. Danson, Jr. (REP) - 35,922 (65.9%)

District 75

- Wayne H. Duncan (DEM) - 10,674 (33.9%)
- Fred Burrall (REP) - 20,848 (66.1%)

District 76

- Dale Cassens (DEM) - 10,870 (47.6%)
- Charles (Chuck) Nergard (REP) - 11,988 (52.4%).

District 77

- William J. "Bill" Taylor (DEM) - 14,080 (48.3%)
- William G. (Doc) Myers (REP) - 15,075 (51.7%)

District 78

- Ray Liberti (DEM) - 78,095 (50.9%)
- Frank Messersmith (REP) - 75,380 (49.1%)

District 79

- Eleanor Weinstock (DEM) - 80,222 (50.6%)
- Reid Moore (REP) - 78,456 (49.4%)

District 80

- Carol A. Roberts (DEM) - 76,797 (49.3%)
- Jim Watt (REP) - 79,094 (50.7%)

District 81

- Edward J. Healey (DEM) - 78,776 (51.0%)
- R. S. "Bob" Nichols (REP) - 75,615 (49.0%)

District 82

- Gene Campbell (DEM) - 79,738 (52.3%)
- Anita K. Mitchell (REP) - 72,753 (47.7%)

District 83

- J. Justin "J J." Findley (DEM) - 56,306 (37.0%)
- Tom Lewis (REP) - 95,864 (63.0%)

District 84 Republican primary

- Douglas C. "Doug" Brown - 11,342 (45.2%)
- Tom Bush - 13,745 (54.8%)

District 84

- Mitch Ceasar (DEM) - 63,697 (46.0%)
- Tom Bush (REP) - 74,721 (54.0%)

District 85

- Terry O'Malley (DEM) - 84,987 (60.6%)
- Stuart L. Stein (REP) - 55,368 (39.4%)

District 86

- Linda Cox (DEM) - 79,533 (57.9%)
- Marty Sacks (REP) - 57,793 (42.1%)

District 87

- Steve Warner (DEM) - 81,105 (59.0%)
- Jim Todd (REP) - 56,281 (41.0%)

District 88 Republican primary

- Richard Badame - 11,430 (47.1%)
- Jeanne E. Faiks - 12,816 (52.9%)

District 88 general election

- Tom Gustafson (DEM) - 93,373 (65.2%)
- Jeanne E. Faiks (REP) - 49,746 (34.8%)

District 89 Republican primary

- Dave Danziger - 940 (14.6%)
- Mary Ellen Hawkins - 5,506 (85.4%)

District 89 general election

- Nelson A. Faerber, Jr. (DEM) - 7,305 (27.6%)
- Mary Ellen Hawkins (REP) - 19,174 (72.4%)

District 90

- Franklin B. (Frank) Mann (DEM) - 37,853 (58.0%)
- Bob Privette (REP) - 27,454 (42.0%)

District 91

- Isaac "Ike" Anderson, Jr. (DEM) - 17,999 (27.4%)
- Hugh Paul Nuckolls (REP) - 47,622 (72.6%)

District 95

- Walter C. "Walt" Young (DEM) - 79,500 (71.9%)
- Ronald "Ron" LaDuke (REP) - 31,093 (28.1%)

District 96

- Lawrence J. Smith (DEM) - 70,973 (63.8%)
- Charles W. Flanagan (REP) - 40,243 (36.2%)

District 98

- Elaine Gordon (DEM) - 89,509 (79.7%)
- Jim Kohlman (REP) - 22,778 (20.3%)

District 100

- Virginia Rosen (DEM) - 84,298 (80.0%)
- Rhonda Luihn Sabatino (REP) - 21,042 (20.0%)

District 103

- Ronald (Ron) A. Silver (DEM) - 76,895 (75.1%)
- Ralph Fine (REP) - 25,518 (24.9%)

District 105

- Joe Kershaw (DEM) - 36,876 (68.8%)
- Alberto V. Darby (REP) - 16,692 (31.2%)

District 109

- Joe Gersten (DEM) - 36,854 (60.0%)
- Bud McDougal (REP) - 24,562 (40.0%)

District 110

- Roberta Fox (DEM) - 34,884 (58.0%)
- Walter W. Sackett, Jr. (REP) - 25,282 (42.0%)

District 111

- Alan Rosenthal (DEM) - 28,522 (48.8%)
- Tom Gallagher (REP) - 29,866 (51.2%)

District 112 Republican primary

- Nancy O. Harrington - 4,375 (53.9%)
- Raul R. Oliva - 3,738 (46.1%)

District 112

- Lawrence H. "Larry" Plummer (DEM) - 35,645 (61.3%)
- Nancy O. Harrington (REP) - 22,540 (38.7%)

District 113

- William E. "Bill" Sadowski (DEM) - 36,661 (63.7%)
- Ceferino C. Rodriguez (REP) - 20,884 (36.3%)

District 114

- Robert (Bob) Hector (DEM) - 35,125 (59.4%)
- Don Slesnick, II (REP) - 23,990 (40.6%)

District 116 Democratic runoff

- Deborah DeBella - 14,048 (48.2%)
- Gene Flinn - 15,099 (51.8%)

District 116

- Gene Flinn (DEM) - 54,561 (62.0%)
- Tom Endterb (REP) - 33,410 (38.0%)

District 117 Democratic primary

- Emmett Benjamin - 7,511 (27.1%)
- Bill Flynn - 14,847 (53.5%)
- H. Clayton Hamilton - 5,388 (19.4%)

District 117 general election

- Bill Flynn (DEM) - 53,852 (60.6%)
- Robert "Bob" Godoy (REP) - 34,968 (39.4%)

District 118

- John Cyril Malloy (DEM) - 50,923 (60.1%)
- Dick Hayes (REP) - 33,784 (39.9%)

District 119 Democratic primary

- Eduardo (Eddy) Arango - 4,889 (17.3%)
- Larry Hawkins - 6,057 (21.4%)
- Thomas (Tom) Holland - 5,346 (18.9%)
- John "Fred" Kuhn, Jr. - 2,997 (10.6%)
- Dexter Lehtinen - 8,952 (31.7%)

District 119 Democratic runoff

- Larry Hawkins - 13,355 (51.1%)
- Dexter Lehtinen - 12,767 (48.9%)

District 120

- Joe Allen - 7,370 (81.2%)
- Cora H. Wilbur - 1,705 (18.8%)

== Constitutional Amendments ==
Revision of Florida Constitution (basic document)

- Yes - 623,703 (29.2%)
- No - 1,512,106 (70.8%)

Declaration of rights (rev. of Art. I, Sec. 2)

- Yes - 1,002,479 (43.1%)
- No - 1,323,497 (56.9%)

Legislative [Single-Member Districts and Reapportionment Commission] (rev. Art. III, Sec. 16)

- Yes - 982,747 (46.9%)
- No - 1,113,394 (53.1%)

Executive [Cabinet] (rev. Art. IV, Secs. (g) 3, 4, 5, 6, 8(a); Art. XI, Sec. 2)

- Yes - 540,979 (25.1%)
- No - 1,614,630 (74.9%)

Executive [Public Service Commission and Public Counsel] (rev. Art. IV, Sec. 10; Art. V, Sec. 3(b)(3))

- Yes - 772,066 (35.9%)
- No - 1,375,548 (64.1%)

Judiciary [Selection and retention of circuit and county judges] (rev. Art. V, Secs. 10 and 11 (a) and (b))

- Yes - 1,058,574 (49.1%)
- No - 1,095,756 (50.9%)

Finance and Taxation (rev. Art. VII; Art. X, Sec. 12(h))

- Yes - 779,389 (36.3%)
- No - 1,368,346 (63.7%)

Education (rev. Art. IX)

- Yes - 771,282 (36.3%)
- No - 1,353,986 (63.7%)

Casino gambling (Art. X, Sec. 15)

- Yes - 687,460 (28.6%)
- No - 1,720,275 (71.4%)

== State Attorney and Public Defender ==
State Attorney (Circuit 20)

- Frank C. Alderman (DEM) - 43,515 (40.4%)
- Joseph P. D'Alessandro (REP) - 64,128 (59.6%)

Public Defender (Circuit 20)

- Douglas M. Midgely (DEM) - 55,356 (53.4%)
- Xavier "X" Fernandez (REP) - 48,327 (46.6%)

== District Court of Appeal ==
Florida First District Court of Appeal

Shall Judge Woodrow M. Melvin, Sr. be retained in office?

- YES - 194,993 (54.9%)
- No - 160,183 (45.1%)

Florida Second District Court of Appeal

Shall Judge Edward F. Boardman be retained in office?

- YES - 378,388 (61.3%)
- NO - 238,714 (38.7%)

Shall Judge Paul W. Danahy, Jr. be retained in office?

- YES - 384,035 (63.2%)
- NO - 223,636 (36.8%)

Shall Judge Herboth S. Ryder be retained in office?

- YES - 383,128 (63.3%)
- NO - 222,439 (36.7%)

Florida Third District Court of Appeal

Shall Judge Thomas H. Barkdull, Jr. be retained in office?

- YES - 182,157 (68.5%)
- NO - 83,837 (31.5%)

Shall Judge Robert M. Haverfield be retained in office?

- YES - 181,789 (70.4%)
- NO - 76,580 (29.6%)

Shall Judge James W. Kehoe be retained in office?

- YES - 184,840 (71.8%)
- NO - 72,458 (28.2%)

Florida Fourth District Court of Appeal

Shall Judge Spencer C. Cross be retained in office?

- YES - 324,882 (62.0%)
- NO - 199,315 (38.0%)

Shall Judge John H. Moore, II be retained in office?

- YES - 334,680 (64.6%)
- NO - 183,693 (35.4%)

== Circuit Judge ==
Circuit 4, Group 17

- Lawrence D. Fay - 64,145 (54.5%)
- John E. Palmer - 53,616 (45.5%)

Circuit 5, Group 1

- Carven D. Angel - 43,086 (57.7%)
- C. John Coniglio - 31,588 (42.3%)

Circuit 9, Group 1

- Ted Coleman - 43,380 (48.4%)
- Rom W. Powell - 46,223 (51.6%)

Circuit 11, Group 30

- Frederick N. Barad - 165,762 (53.2%)
- Carol King Guralnick - 145,988 (46.8%)

Circuit 17, Group: 4

- Sheldon Golding - 89,932 (42.3%)
- Joseph E. Price - 122,465 (57.7%)

Circuit 19, Group 1

- Ken Sharp - 25,381 (55.3%)
- Dean Tooker - 20,536 (44.7%)

Circuit 20, Group 2

- Ted Brousseau - 49,196 (52.5%)
- Thomas R. Brown - 44,433 (47.
