= Laurent Belanger =

American politician (1931–2023)

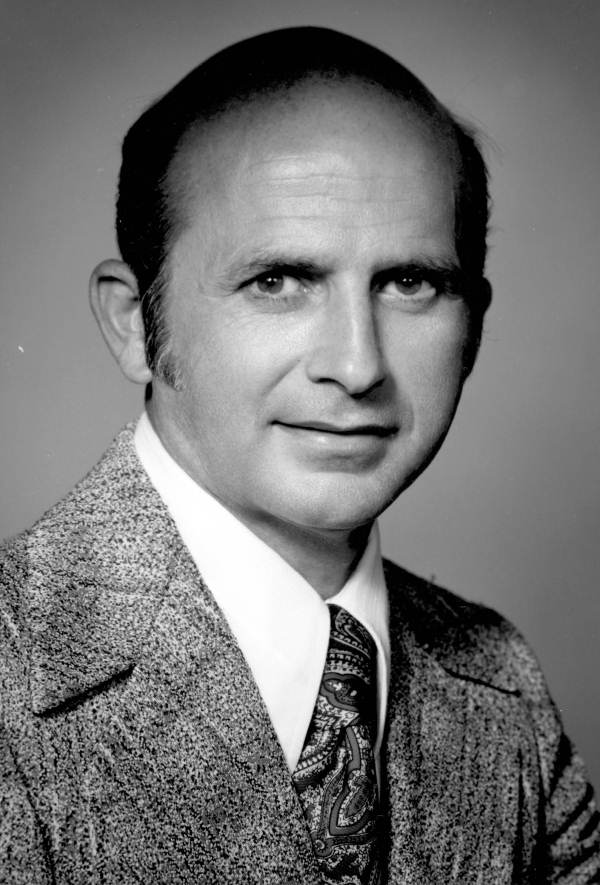
- Belanger in 1974

Member of the Florida House of Representatives from the 61st district
- In office 1974–1976
- Preceded by: Donald Crane
- Succeeded by: Dorothy Eaton Sample

Personal details
- Born: May 31, 1931 Manchester, New Hampshire, U.S.
- Died: June 9, 2023 (aged 92)
- Party: Republican
- Education: Saint Anselm College; Loyola University Chicago

Laurent W. Belanger (May 31, 1931 – June 9, 2023) was an American politician. He served as a Republican member for the 61st district of the Florida House of Representatives.

== Life and career ==
Belanger was born in Manchester, New Hampshire, on May 31, 1931. He attended Saint Anselm College and Loyola University Chicago.

In 1974, Belanger was elected to represent the 61st district of the Florida House of Representatives, succeeding Donald Crane. He served until 1976, when he was succeeded by Dorothy Eaton Sample.

Belanger died on June 9, 2023, at the age of 92.
