= Tamapahore =

Tamapahore was a Māori rangatira (chief) in the Bay of Plenty region and a founding ancestor of the Ngā Pōtiki ā Tamapahore hapū, which is associated with the Ngāi Te Rangi iwi and the Ngāti Awa confederation. He accompanied his brother Rangihouhiri through a period of protracted migration, known as the Te Heke o Te Rangihouhiri. He participated in the conquest of Maketu and, when his brother was killed during the final battle of the war, Poporohuamea, he took over command and led Ngāi Te Rangi to victory. He joined his grand-nephew Kotorerua in the conquest of Mount Maunganui, but quarrelled with him after the battle and led his people away to settle at Papamoa.

== Life ==
Tamapahore was the half-brother of Rangihouhiri, the founder and namesake of Ngāi Te Rangi. They were sons of Rongomainohorangi and Tauwhitu. Through his father, he was a direct descendant of Toroa, captain of the Mataatua canoe, which travelled to Aotearoa from Hawaiki, the earlier explorer Toi te huatahi, and Tamatea Arikinui, captain of the Tākitimu. Tamapahore's mother was Tuwairua, who was also a direct descendant of Toroa, through Wairaka and Pukenga, founder of Ngāti Pukenga. He had three full brothers: Tamapinaki, Tamaumuroa, and Werapinaki.

=== Te Heke o Te Rangihouhiri ===
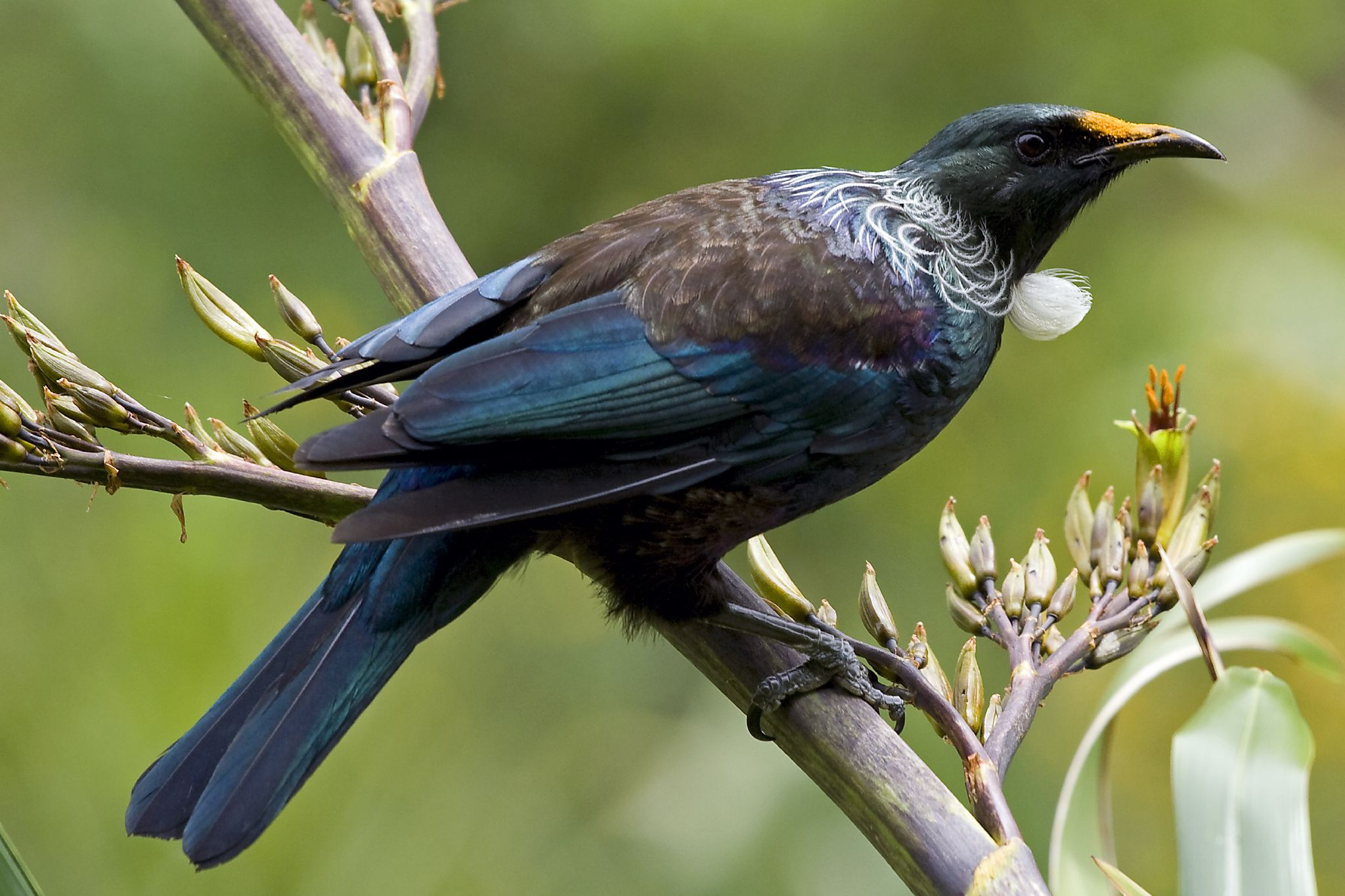
Tūī

In the time of Rangihouhiri's grandfather, Rongotangiawa, Ngāti Awa was based at Tawhitirahi pā next to the Kukumoa stream, west of Opotiki. Kahukino (perhaps identical with Rangihouhiri's father, Rongomainohorangi), one of the inhabitants of the pā, had a pet tūī, which could sing and talk on command. A visitor from Ngāti Hā asked for this tūī as a gift, but Kahukino refused, so Ngāti Hā attacked and drove Ngāti Awa out of the region. This began a long period of migration for the people, known as Te Heke o Te Rangihouhiri.

Rongomainohorangi led the people all the way to the East Cape, where they were given refuge by Te Waho-o-te-rangi of Ngai te Rangihokaia, who settled them on Te Whakaroa mountain on the Waimata River, where they were required to hunt birds and rats for him. Rongomainohorangi told the people moe iho, moe iho ia tatau ano, whakatupu ia a tatau kia tini (Marry into our own tribe and build up our numbers, that we may become numerous). The tribe grew and eventually Rangihouhiri became its leader. The growth of Ngāti Awa worried Waho-o-te-rangi and on his deathbed, Ngāti Rongowhakaata drove Ngāti Awa out of the region.

The people travelled away from Te Whakaroa by sea to Ūawa (Tolaga Bay), but decided that the local iwi, Ngāti Porou, was too strong, so they travelled on to Te Kaha. Here, Rangihouhiri and Tamapahore's uncle, Tamahape, murdered one of the local men, Te Wharau, so they had to move on quickly. Finally, they settled at Hakuranui at Tōrere on the Bay of Plenty (northeast of their original home at Tawhitirahi).

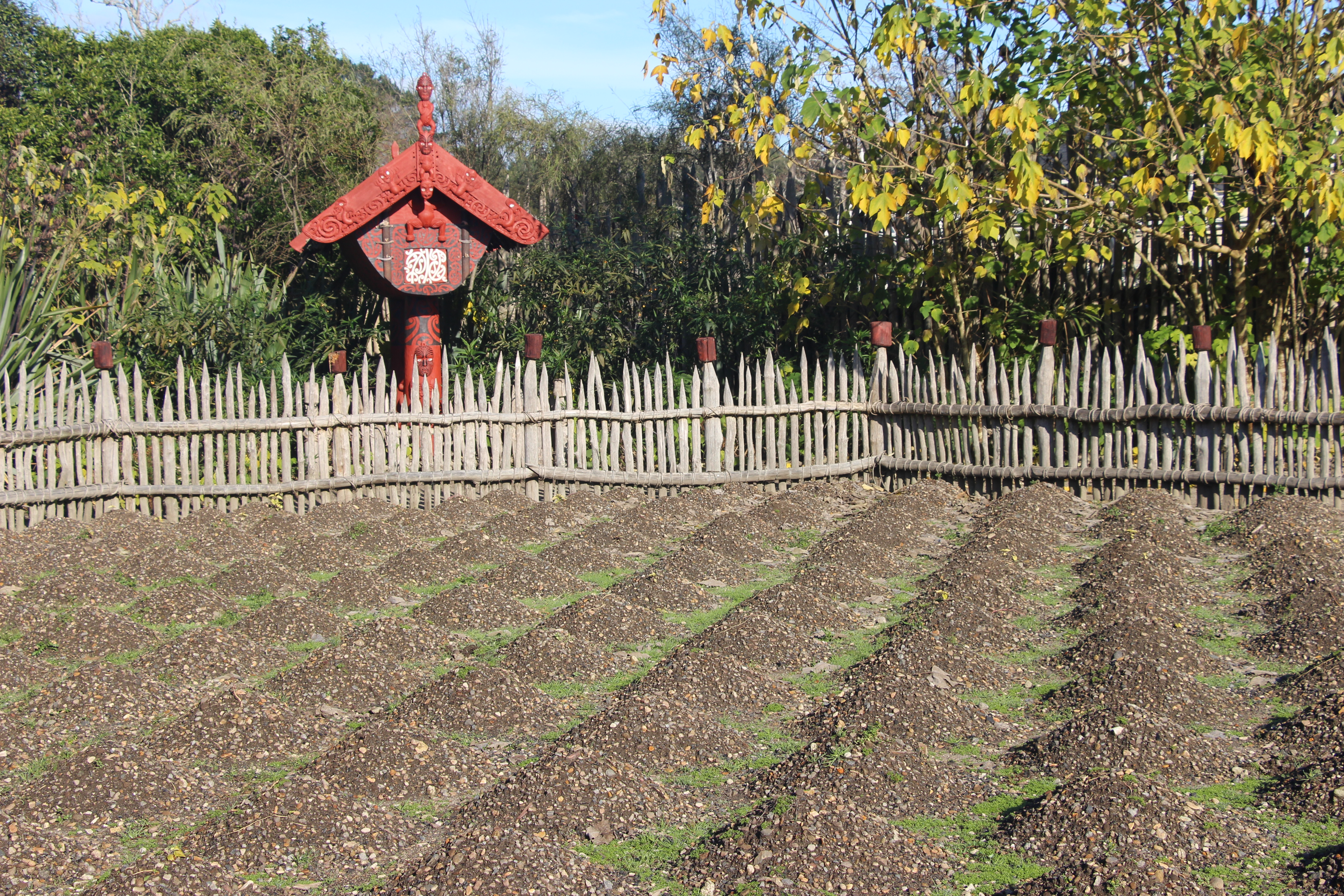
Rows of puke (earth mounds) for planting kūmara (Te Parapara in the Hamilton Gardens, Waikato)

Tōrere was already inhabited by Ngāitai, who became hostile to Ngāti Awa, after Tongarewa, son of Awatope of Ngāti Awa killed Te Whanaoterangi of Ngāitai. Penu of Ngāitai led a war party against Ngāti Awa and killed a man called Tukoukou, while he was out sowing kūmara seeds. Two men from the Waitaha iwi of Te Arawa, called Pohu and Matauaua, happened to be travelling through Tōrere at the time and they were accused of stealing the Tukoukou's remains from a canoe where they had been being stored. They were forced to flee.

The tribe carried on to Whakatane. There, Rangihouhiri decided to conquer a pā just inland from Whakatane at Papaka. Tamapahore snuck up in the night to investigate Papaka's fortifications. As he was doing this he caught sight of a woman using the latrine, so he poked her from below with his taiaha spear, then fled. She raised the alarm, which meant that the attack on Papaka had to be called off. Moreover, since she was the daughter of the chief of Papaka, the people were keen to get revenge on Tamapahore and Rangihouhiri, so it became urgent for them to leave the area. So, they went on to Te Awa-a-te-Atua (near Matatā), where they were again told to move on.

=== The conquest of Maketu ===
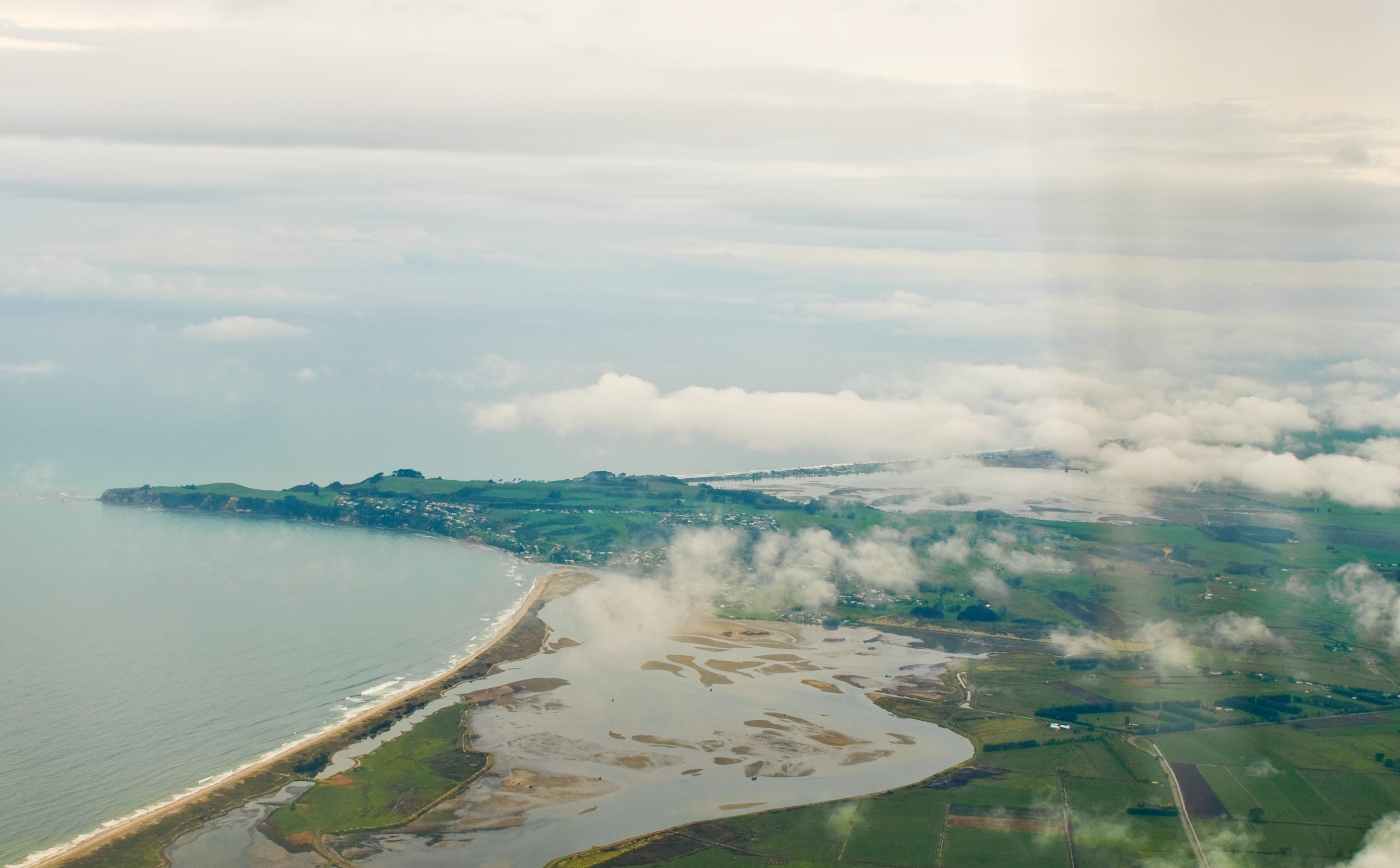
Maketu, seen from the west

Rangihouhiri told Tamapahore to go to Maketu, where his aunt Torohangataringa had married a member of Tapuika, to visit Tatahau and Ngakohua, chiefs of Tapuika, and to investigate the land. When he reported back about its wealth, Rangihouhiri decided to conquer the territory. One version says that he pointed to the murder of Tukoukou as a justification for this. In another version, Ngakohua gave Rangihouhiri a pā called Owhara, on the coast to the east of Maketu, due to kinship ties between them.

The force on the edge of the Waihi estuary, just east of Maketu. They took Pukemaire, Otitoko, Waitangi, Muriwharau, Te Kahika, and Te Parapara from Tatahau's sons, Manu and Tiritiri. Finally, they sought refuge in the Ngāti Moko fortress at Tauwharekiri. Ngāti Awa were unable to take this fortress, so they returned to Maketu and consolidated their position there.

Manu and Tiritiri returned, supported by Kinonui, a powerful tohunga from Waikato, as well as allies from Tapuika and Waitaha. The allies marched on Maketu and captured Herekaki and Pukemaire. Ngāti Awa fled to Owhara. The allies also took Pukemaire and killed its commander, Tamakahokino. The rest of Rangihouhiri's force The next day, Ngāti Awa, assisted by a war party from Ngāti Pukenga led by Kahukino and Te Tini o Awa, fought against Tapuika, Waitaha, and Waikato in a great battle on the edge of the Waihi estuary, known as the Battle of Poporohuamea. Rangihouhiri was killed in the battle, but Tamapahore took over the command and led Ngāti Awa to victory. As a result, they gained control of Maketu for the next two generations.

=== Conquest of Maunganui ===
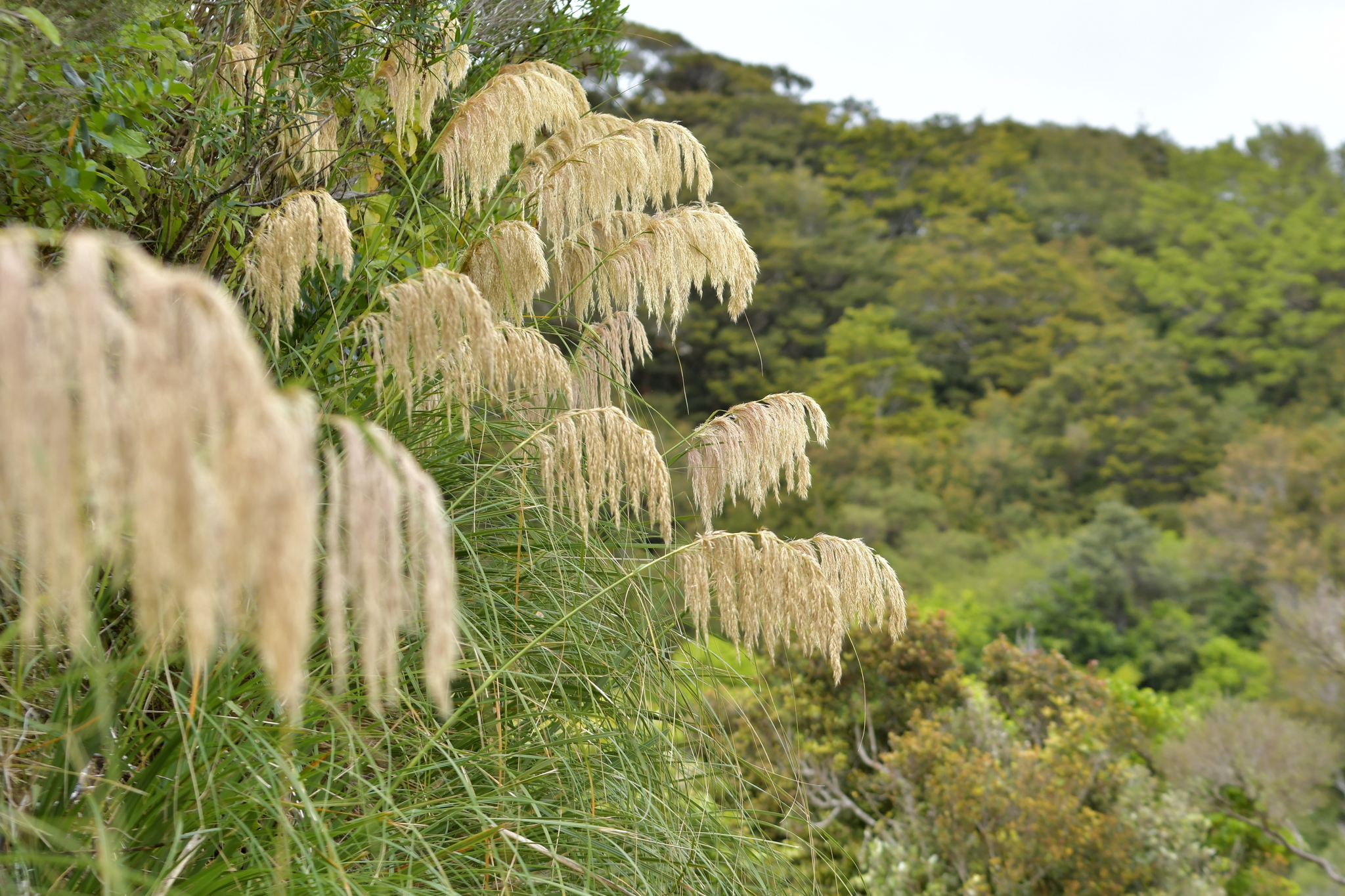
Toetoe grass, renowned for the sharp edges of its blades

A man of Ngati Ranginui, called Taurawheke, was shipwrecked at Maketu and found on the shore by a lady of Ngai-te-Rangi who attempted to nurse him back to health. But when her husband discovered who he was, he killed Taurawheke. Later on, she got into an argument with her husband and was overheard berating him for the murder. In revenge, warriors of Ngati Ranginui ambushed Tuwhiwhia, one of the sons of Rangihouhiri, and his own son Tauaiti, while they were out collecting toetoe on the banks of the Kaituna River, and killed them. Tuwhiwhia was beheaded and thrown in the river. Tauaiti was taken to Whareroa and tortured by slowly lacerating his flesh with the sharp edge of the toetoe grass. After he died, he was thrown into Te Awa o Tukorako. These murders were discovered and Tuwhiwhia's younger son, Kotorerua led the campaign of revenge, despite Tamapahore's calls for the murders to be recognised as just revenge for the killing of Taurawheke.

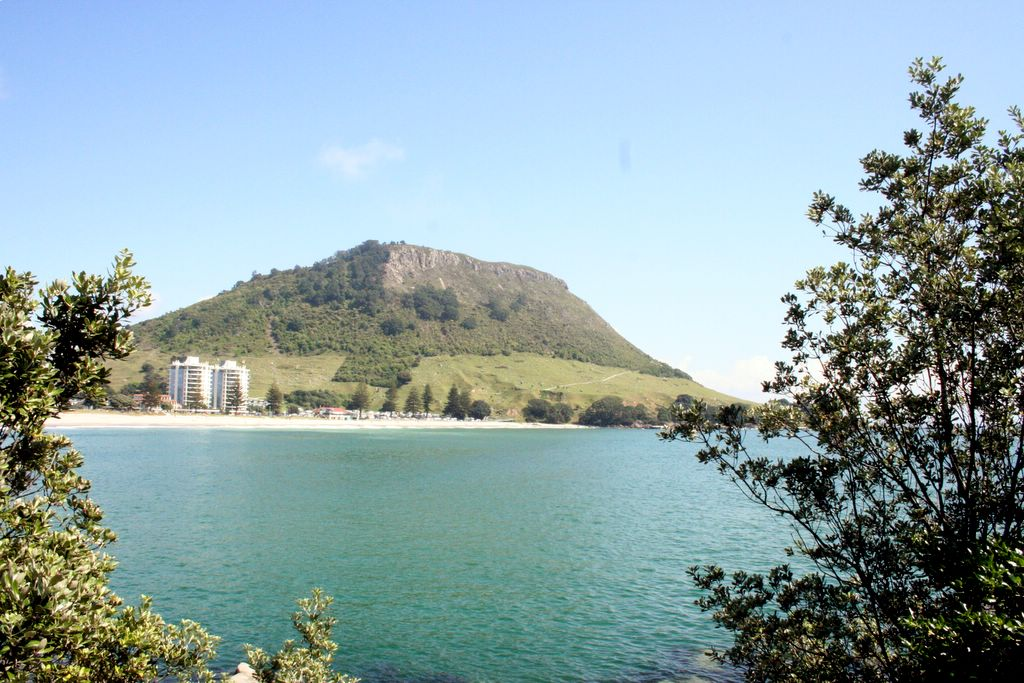
Mount Maunganui

Kotorerua decided to seize Mount Maunganui, which was held by Waitaha and Ngāti Ranginui. He distracted them by coming as a guest. In the evening, Tamapahore led a fleet to attack the Waitaha and Ngāti Ranginui ships, then attack the mountain from the sea. Tamapahore carried out the attack on the ships and Maunganui was captured.

=== Migration to Papamoa ===
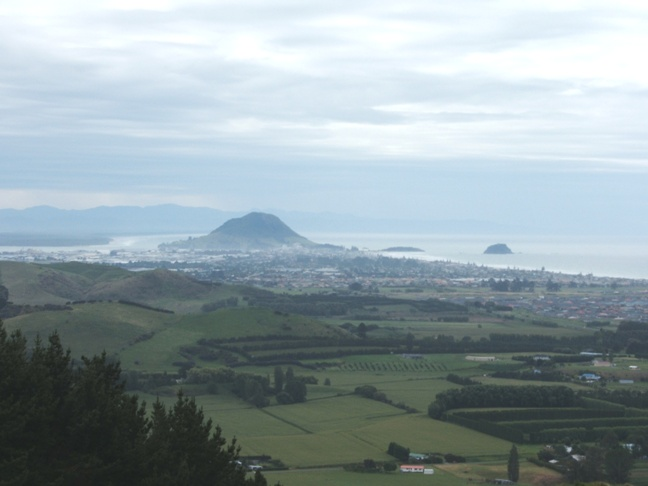
View west from the Papamoa hills towards Mount Maunganui. Mangatawa is the low hill at left in the middle distance.

However, Tamapahore chafed under his nephew's authority. He was accused of having held his forces back from the assault. After the victory, Tamapahore was initially allowed to settle at the bottom of the Mountain but later tried to move to the top, at which point Kotorerua's people refused and rolled stones down at Tamapahore. Therefore, he led his people away to settle on the Maungatapu peninsula, across the bay from Maunganui. Later, he led them further east to the Papamoa hills, where he established pā at Karangauma and Te Whaaro, which provided a secure location from which to take advantage of the food sources in the Bay of Plenty and in the inland forests. He also maintained a settlement at Mangatawa (Papamoa beach).

=== Campaigns of Rangihouhiri-a-Kahukino ===
When Tampahore was old, his grandchildren began encouraging him to let them attack Otumoetai pa, which was held by chief Takau of Ngati Ranginui. Tamapahore no longer had the drive to undertake such an expedition himself, but he allowed his headstrong grandson Rangihouhiri-a-Kahukino to undertake the campaign, so long as he delayed his attack "until the sun reflected on the waters of Rangataua." When he arrived, Takau let him marry his daughter Hinewa, and Rangihouhiri-a-Kahukino withrew (Otumoetai was nevertheless destroyed by some of his allies who had not been party to the marriage negotiations).

Meanwhile, Hipaka of the Waitaha people from Maungatapu killed Tamapahore's son Tamapiri and his brother Tamapinaki in an incident known as Te ika hui rua a Hikapa ('the two fish caught by Hipaka'). Tamapahore appointed Rangihouhiri-a-Kahukino to take revenge by attacking Maungatapu. They attacked, but were forced to withdraw as a result of heavy casualties. Tamapahore decided to seek a longer-term revenge. He sent two members of his tribe, Taraka and his wife Hinewai (who had ties to Waitaha), to settle at Maungatapu. Their grandchild, turapaki, became chief of Maungatapu.

== Family and commemoration ==
Tamapahore married his cousin Te Aotakawhakia, with whom he had the following offspring:

- Uruhina, who married her cousin Hikakino and had a son:

- Rangihouhiri (II)

- Toanatini, who married Tiawhakaea
- Puani, who married Hunanga.

- Kiritawhiti
- Rereoho
- Kahukino:

- Rangihouhiri a Kahukino

- Tamapiri
- Parewaitai

He also married Ngaruahaoa, the widow of Koperu and a descendant of Ngatoroirangi, and they had one daughter:

- Ngaparetaihinu, who married Tukorehe, a descendant of Whatihua and had descendants, including Ngāti Hauā.

The marae at Mangatawa is named Tampahore in his honour. The original structure was at karikari point, but it was rebuilt at Kiarua in 1957.

A pouwhenua depicting Tamapahore was erected at Mercury Baypark Stadium and Arena. It was carved by Dean Flavell from totara wood that had been salvaged from the first wharf built at Tauranga in 1871.

== Bibliography ==
- Stafford, D.M. (1967). Te Arawa: A History of the Arawa People. Rotorua, New Zealand: A.H. & A.W. Reed.
- Steedman, J.A.W. (1984). Ngā Ohaaki o ngā Whānau o Tauranga Moana: Māori History and Genealogy of the Bay of Plenty.
