= Kotorerua =

Kotorerua was a Māori rangatira (chief) of the Ngāi Te Rangi iwi, in the Bay of Plenty region of New Zealand. He led the Ngāi Te Rangi conquest of Mount Maunganui and Tauranga from Waitaha and Ngati Ranginui in revenge for their murder of his father and elder brother.

== Life ==
Kotorerua was the son of Tuwhiwhia and Aoreke. Tuwhiwhia was himself the son of Rangihouhiri, the founding ancestor of Ngāi Te Rangi. Through him, he was a direct descendant of Awanuiarangi, the ancestor of Ngāti Awa; Toroa, captain of the Mataatua canoe, which travelled to Aotearoa from Hawaiki; the earlier explorer Toi te huatahi; and Tamatea Arikinui, captain of the Tākitimu. He had tw brothers, Tauaiti and Paretapapa, and a sister Tuwera. Kotorerua had red hair.

=== Murder of Tuwhiwhia and Tauaiti ===
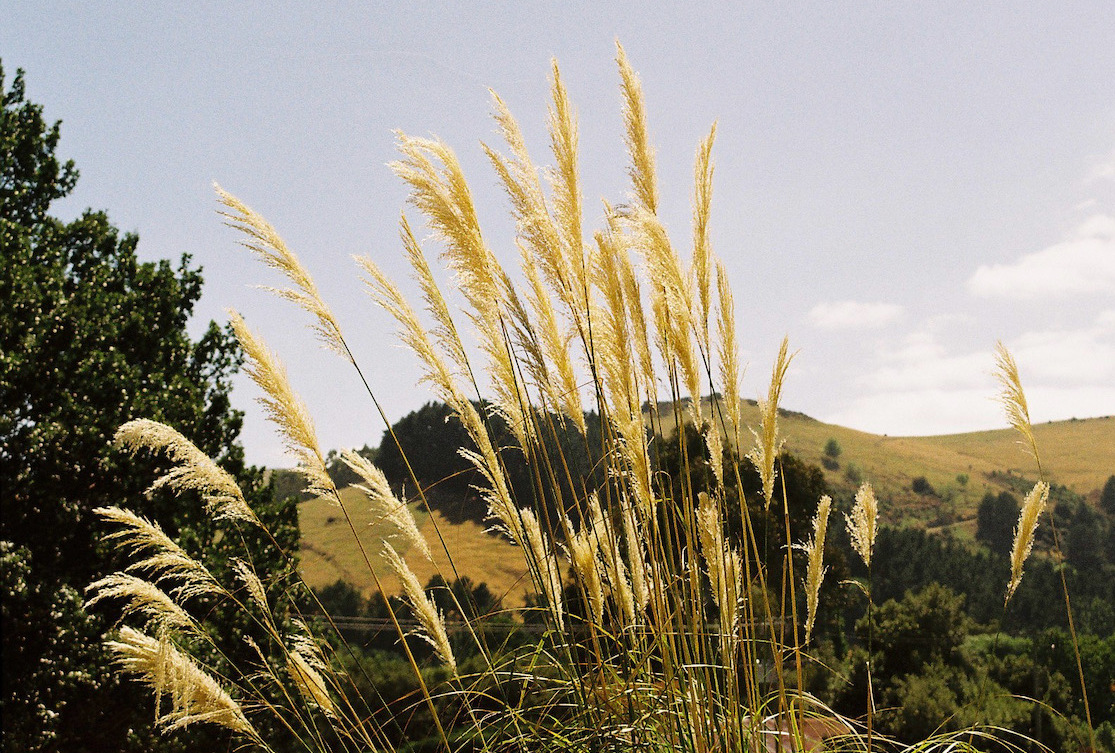
Toetoe grass.

In this period, Mount Maunganui and Tauranga belonged to the Waitaha and Ngati Ranginui iwi. Two Waitaha chiefs, Taurawheke and Te Turanganui, led a fishing expedition that was caught in a storm. Everyone was killed, except for Taurawheke, who made it to Okurei point, Maketu. He was discovered by a local woman who tried to nurse him back to health, but her husband killed him and ate him.

When Waitaha and Ngati Ranginui discovered this, they sought revenge by leading a war party to attack Ngāi Te Rangi at Te Tumu. There they found Kotorerua's father and brother, Tuwhiwhia and Tauaiti, harvesting toetoe grass at Otaiparia. They killed Tuwhiwhia, cut off his head, and sent his body down the Kaituna river to Maketu in a canoe, where it was discovered by Ngāi Te Rangi. Meanwhile, the war party took Tauaiti back to Tauranga and tortured him to death, lacerating him with the sharp edges of the toetoe. His dying words, a kua neu te moana i hohonu, me hanga kia papaku ("my pain is shallow compared to the ocean of pain to come") predicted Kotorerua's revenge.

=== Journey to Waikato ===
When Ngāi Te Rangi found Tuwhiwhia's body, the elderly leader of the tribe, Tamapahore did not want to seek revenge, but Kotorerua convinced the people that they should. He began planning a campaign of revenge, along with Putangimaru, a visiting chief of Ngati Raukawa in the Waikato. To consolidate the alliance between them, Kotorerua married his sister Tuwera to Putangimaru and agreed to travel to Putangimaru's home in Waikato in order to form the war party. Tuwera made Putangimaru support the plan by demanding it when they were about to have sex.

Kotorerua travelled across the Otawa hills to Te Pawhakahorohoro. He was met here by a guide called Ika, who had been sent by Putangimaru. This man led Kotorerua to a lookout point at Whenuakura (according to Don Stafford) or Taumata in the Kaimai Range (according to Steedman) and pointed out Putangimaru's village, Hinuera. As he had been instructed by Putangimaru, Kotorerua then murdered Ika, so that he could use his body parts for divination. On arrival at Hinuera, Kotorerua jumped over the paepae, signifying that he had followed all of Putangimaru's instructions. When he met Putangimaru, the latter used Ika's head or heart in order to predict the success of their planned expedition. Then Kotorerua returned to Maketu to raise his war party.

=== Battle of the Kokowai ===
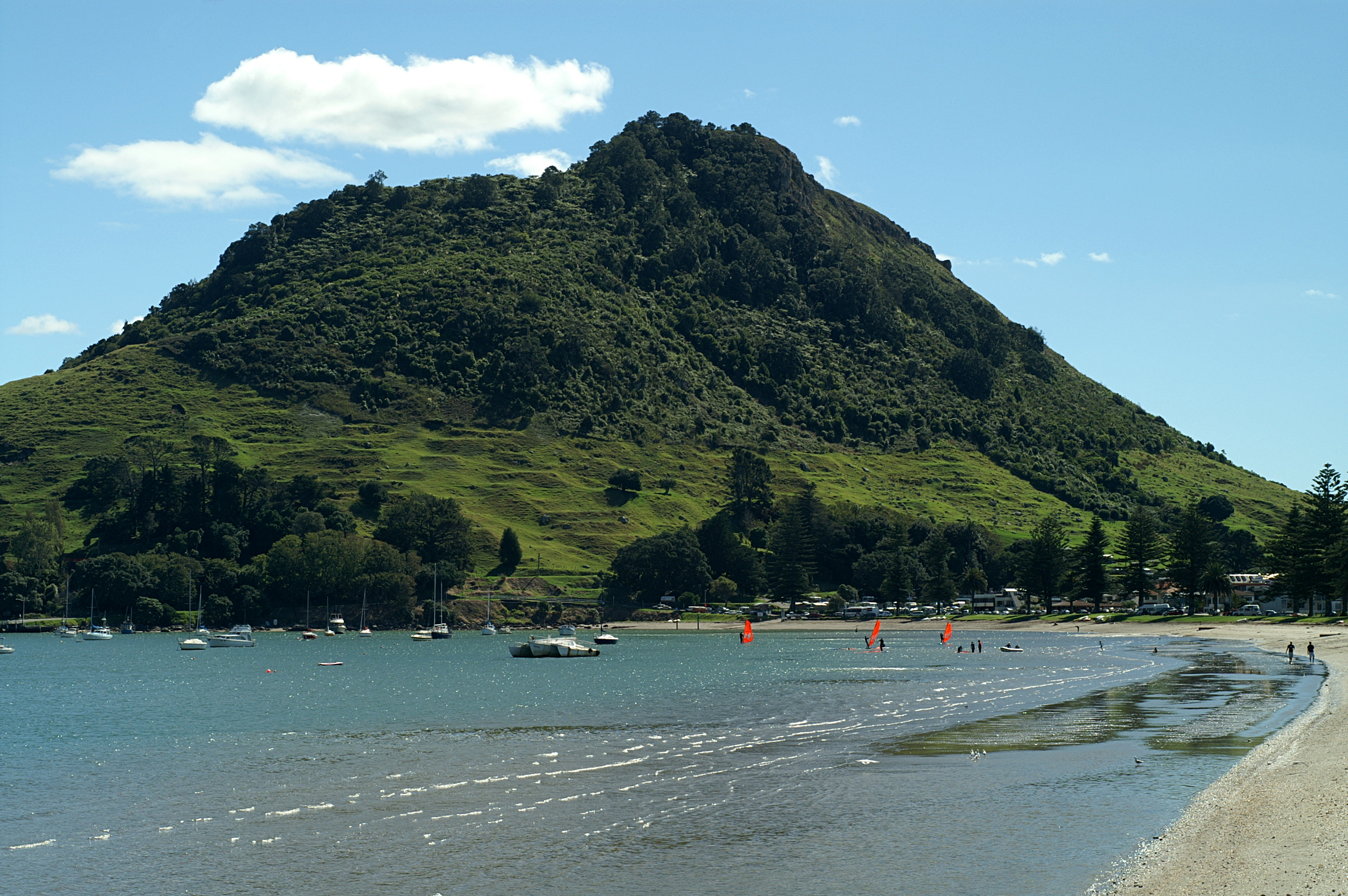
Mount Maunganui (Mauao), seen from the east.

Mount Maunganui (more properly known as Mauao), sits at the western end of a spit of land, guarding the entrance to Tauranga Bay. At this time, the whole mountain was fortified and inhabited, with Waitaha on the eastern side and Ngati Ranginui on the western side. The main chief was Kinonui. A palisade wall ran around the whole mountain, except for the northern side, where the cliff was so steep that it appeared unnecessary. Instead, the inhabitants kept a number of boulders at the top of the cliff, which they would roll down on top of anyone who tried to assault the settlement from the north.

Kotorerua came to Maunganui with 140 men late at night, pretending that they had come to give the inhabitants a hundred baskets of kokowai (red ochre) from the Kaikokopu stream (in fact these were baskets of dirt with just a narrow layer of red ochre on top). Because of these baskets, the conquest is known as the Battle of the Kokowai. The visitors were welcomed into the settlement as honoured guests and hosted at the marae, both sides pretending to be friendly, while plotting the destruction of the other.

Once it was dark, a fleet of Ngāi Te Rangi ships commanded by Tamapahore (Kotorerua's great-uncle) arrived and took advantage of a storm or the new moon to land on the mountain at Te Awaiti without being detected. They found the inhabitants' canoes and smashed them all. Then they climbed up the undefended north face of the mountain, again without being detected. Meanwhile, Kotorerua's companions had been leaving the marae, one by one, each claiming to be tired. One of these men returned to tell Kotorerua that everyone was in position and he leapt up and left the building, sealed the door, and set the marae on fire, killing Kinonui and the other leaders. Ngāi Te Rangi seized the fortress; Waitaha and Ngati Ranginui surrendered.

While Kotorerua was briefly absent, Ngāi Te Rangi and Ngati Ranginui at Otumoetai agreed to a peace deal and confirmed it by marriage alliances. But when Kotorerua returned, he was furious and he attacked and destroyed Otumoetai. He also sacked several settlements on the south shore of Tauranga harbour, thereby sealing the Ngāi Te Rangi conquest of Tauranga.

== Family ==
Kotorerua had one son, Kaihau, who had one son Te Hae, who married Tiria, who had one son Te Urupiki who married Waihi, who had one son: Wharetuai who married Whakarau and had two children: Wahawaha and Kerara.

== Bibliography ==
- Stafford, D.M. (1967). Te Arawa: A History of the Arawa People. Rotorua, New Zealand: A.H. & A.W. Reed.
- Steedman, J.A.W. (1984). Ngā Ohaaki o ngā Whānau o Tauranga Moana: Māori History and Genealogy of the Bay of Plenty.
