= John Considine =

John Considine may refer to:

- John Considine (impresario) (1868–1943), American impresario and vaudeville pioneer from Seattle
- John W. Considine Jr. (1898–1961), his son, American film producer
- John Considine (actor) (born 1935), his son, American writer and actor
- John J. Considine (born 1948), former American politician and attorney
- John Considine (hurler) (born 1964), Irish hurling manager and former player
- John "Jack" Considine, American politician from Minnesota
- John Considine, editor of the Oxford Dictionary of National Biography
