= Don H. Stafford =

American politician (born 1938)

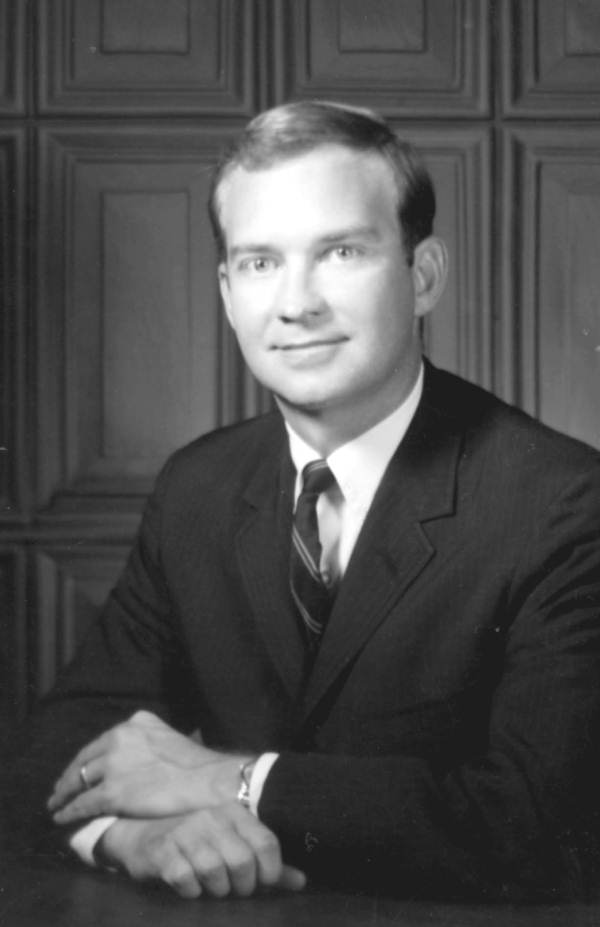
- Stafford in 1966

Member of the Florida House of Representatives from Pinellas County
- In office 1966–1967

Member of the Florida House of Representatives from the 52nd district
- In office 1967–1970
- Preceded by: District established
- Succeeded by: Donald Crane

Personal details
- Born: January 12, 1938 (age 88) Madison County, Alabama, U.S.
- Party: Republican
- Spouse: Donna
- Education: St. Petersburg Junior College; University of Alabama; University of Tampa

Don H. Stafford (born January 12, 1938) is an American politician. He served as a Republican member for the 52nd district of the Florida House of Representatives.

== Life and career ==
Stafford was born in Madison County, Alabama. He attended St. Petersburg Junior College, the University of Alabama and the University of Tampa.

In 1966, Stafford was elected to the Florida House of Representatives. The next year, he was elected as the first representative for the newly-established 52nd district. He served until 1970, when he was succeeded by Donald Crane.
