= Mary Singleton =

American politician

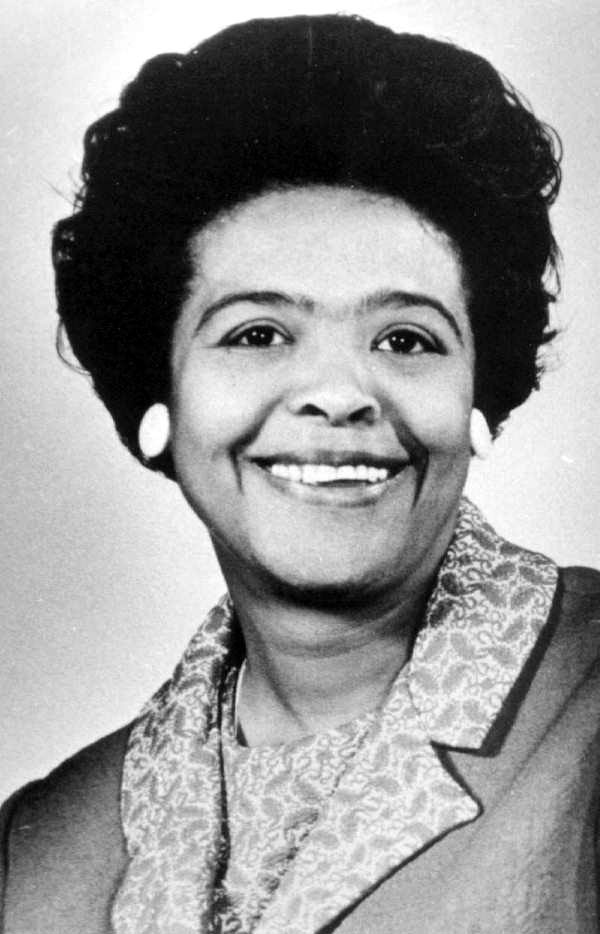
Mary L. Singleton, 1972

Mary Littlejohn Singleton (September 20, 1926 – December 7, 1980) was a Florida teacher and politician, serving on the Jacksonville, Florida City Council before and after the consolidation in 1968 with Duval County. In 1967 she was one of the first two black women elected to the council. She was re-elected after consolidation and served until 1972.

In 1972 Singleton was elected to the state legislature, the first woman and first black elected to that body from North Florida, serving until 1976. She ran unsuccessfully for lieutenant governor, and was appointed to state office after that, living in Tallahassee.

== Early life, education, and career ==
Born in Jacksonville in 1926 as Mary Littlejohn, she first attended local segregated schools. Her parents encouraged education and she earned her degree at Florida A&M University, a historically black university in Tallahassee. She returned to Jacksonville to teach in its schools.

Mary Littlejohn married Isadore Singleton, who became a civil rights activist in Jacksonville in the postwar years. He later served as president of the Jacksonville Negro Chamber of Commerce, as it was then named, and was on the board of directors for Brewster Hospital. He also worked as area coordinator for the federal Peace Corps agency founded by President John F. Kennedy. Isadore died young in 1964. Singleton Park was renamed in his honor by the Jacksonville City Council.

== Civic and political career ==
Singleton created her own political career as an advocate for low-income people in the city, and was active in the black community. She served as Chair of the Child Day Care Commission.

By then a widow, in 1967 Singleton became more deeply involved in politics. Following passage of the Voting Rights Act of 1965, which enforced constitutional rights, she was one of the first two black women to run for and be elected to the Jacksonville City Council. She won the Democratic nomination for the Ward 2 seat on the City Council in 1967, defeating William Thompson, a white man, with 20,648 to his 16,143 votes. (There was no Republican candidate, as that party had been crippled by the state's disenfranchisement of African Americans at the turn of the century.) Singleton and Sallye B. Mathis were both elected to the City Council that year. Singleton was also elected to the first City Council after consolidation, serving two terms from 1968 to 1972.

In 1972 Singleton was elected to the Florida House of Representatives for District 16, after winning the Democratic nomination and facing no Republican opponent. She was the first black from north Florida to be elected to the Florida Legislature since the Reconstruction era, the first woman from that region to serve, and the third black to be elected to the Florida legislature in the 20th century. She was reelected in 1974.

In June 1976 Singleton was appointed as director of the Division of Elections in the Office of the Secretary of State of Florida under Bruce Smathers. She succeeded Dorothy Glisson, who resigned in January 1976 to become secretary of professional and occupational regulation. Singleton was the first black person and the second woman to hold that position.

Mary Singleton resigned as elections director to seek the Democratic nomination for Lieutenant Governor of Florida in the 1978 state elections. She was the running mate of Claude R. Kirk Jr., the colorful former Republican governor of Florida, who attempted a comeback as a Democrat. She had to suspend campaigning in August 1978 to be with her 29-year-old daughter Carol Scott in New Orleans, who was undergoing surgery for cancer. Kirk and Singleton lost the election, placing sixth in a field of seven tickets in the first round of the Democratic primary, with 6 percent of the vote.

Singleton died on December 7, 1980, at age 54, at her Tallahassee home. At the time of her death, she was serving as director of administration for the Banking and Finance Division of the state comptroller's office.

== Legacy and honors ==
- Governor declared December 7, 1990, as "Mary Singleton Day" in remembrance of her efforts toward peace and brotherhood.
- The Jacksonville City Council recognized January 30, 1992, as "Mary Singleton Day."
- The City Council also established the annual "Mary L. Singleton Memorial Award" for Justice, Peace and Social Harmony, which is given by the outgoing council president to the most outstanding committee chair.
- A Jacksonville senior center at 150 E. First Street was named in her honor.
