= Rangihouhiri =

Places in the life of Maruāhaira
1 Tawhitirahi
2 Te Whakaroa, Waimata
3 Ūawa (Tolaga Bay)
4 Te Kaha
5 Hakuranui, Tōrere
6 Whakatane
7 Te Awa-a-te-Atua (near Matatā)
8 Maketu

Rangihouhiri was a Māori rangatira (chief) in the Bay of Plenty region and a founding ancestor of the Ngāi Te Rangi iwi (known in his own lifetime as Ngāti Te Rangihouhiri), part of the Ngāti Awa confederation. He led his people through a period of protracted migration, known as Te Heke o Te Rangihouhiri, culminating in the conquest of Maketu at the Battle of Poporohuamea, at which he himself was killed.

== Life ==
Rangihouhiri was the son of Rongomainohorangi and Tauwhitu. Through his father, he was a direct descendant of Awanuiarangi, the ancestor of Ngāti Awa; Toroa, captain of the Mataatua canoe, which travelled to Aotearoa from Hawaiki; the earlier explorer Toi te huatahi; and Tamatea Arikinui, captain of the Tākitimu. He had four half-brothers: Tamapahore, ancestor of Ngā Pōtiki ā Tamapahore, as well as Tamapinaki, Tamaumuroa, and Werapinaki.

=== Te Heke o Te Rangihouhiri ===
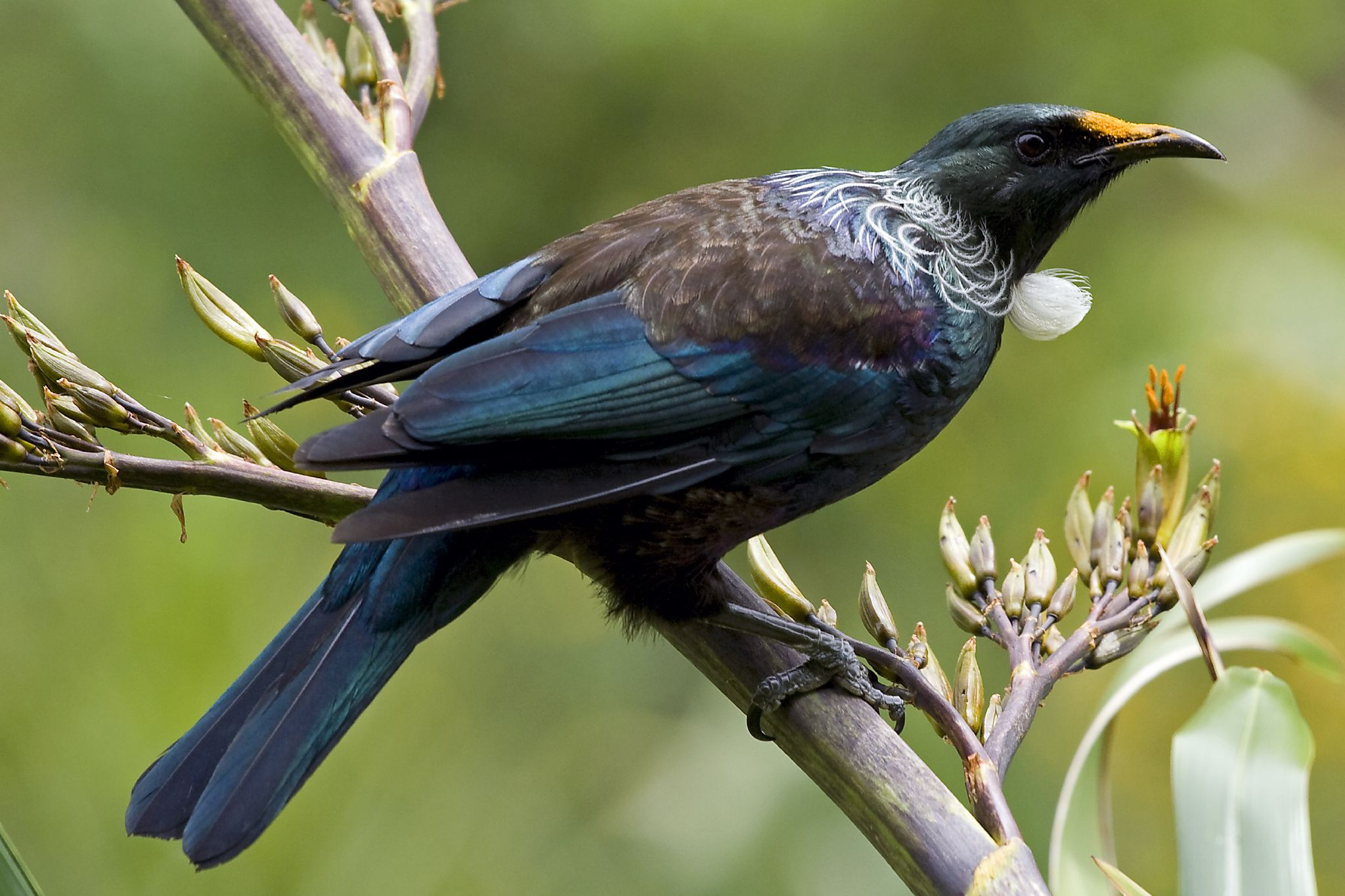
Tūī

In the time of Rangihouhiri's grandfather, Rongotangiawa, Ngāti Awa was based at Tawhitirahi pā next to the Kukumoa stream, west of Opotiki. Kahukino (perhaps identical with Rangihouhiri's father, Rongomainohorangi), one of the inhabitants of the pā, had a pet tūī, which could sing and talk on command. A visitor from Ngāti Hā asked for this tūī as a gift, but Kahukino refused, so Ngāti Hā attacked and drove Ngāti Awa out of the region. This began a long period of migration for the people, known as Te Heke o Te Rangihouhiri.

Rongomainohorangi led the people all the way to the East Cape, where they were given refuge by Te Waho-o-te-rangi of Ngai te Rangihokaia, who settled them on Te Whakaroa mountain on the Waimata River, where they were required to hunt birds and rats for him. Rongomainohorangi told the people moe iho, moe iho ia tatau ano, whakatupu ia a tatau kia tini (Marry into our own tribe and build up our numbers, that we may become numerous). The tribe grew and eventually Rangihouhiri became its leader. The growth of Ngāti Awa worried Waho-o-te-rangi and on his deathbed, he instructed his people to go to Ngāti Awa, with their weapons hidden, and to carry out a massacre on his signal. However, Rangihouhiri and his compatriot Irawharao had married members of the Ngāti Rongowhakaata hapū of Ngāi te Rangihokaia, through whom they learnt about Waho-o-te rangi's plan. They ambushed the attackers. Ngāti Rongowhakaata led out a war party to get revenge, but Rangihouhiri his men defeated them. He made peace, agreeing to leave the area, if Ngāti Rongowhakaata built them enough canoes to transport the entire tribe to a new location.

Then, Rangihouhiri, along with his son Tutenaehe, Te Hapu, and Maruāhaira, led the people away from Te Whakaroa. They travelled by sea to Ūawa (Tolaga Bay), but decided that the local iwi, Ngāti Porou, was too strong, so they travelled on to Te Kaha. Here, Rangihouhiri's uncle, Tamahape, murdered one of the local men, Te Wharau, so Rangihouhiri had to move on quickly. Finally, they settled at Hakuranui at Tōrere on the Bay of Plenty (northeast of their original home at Tawhitirahi).

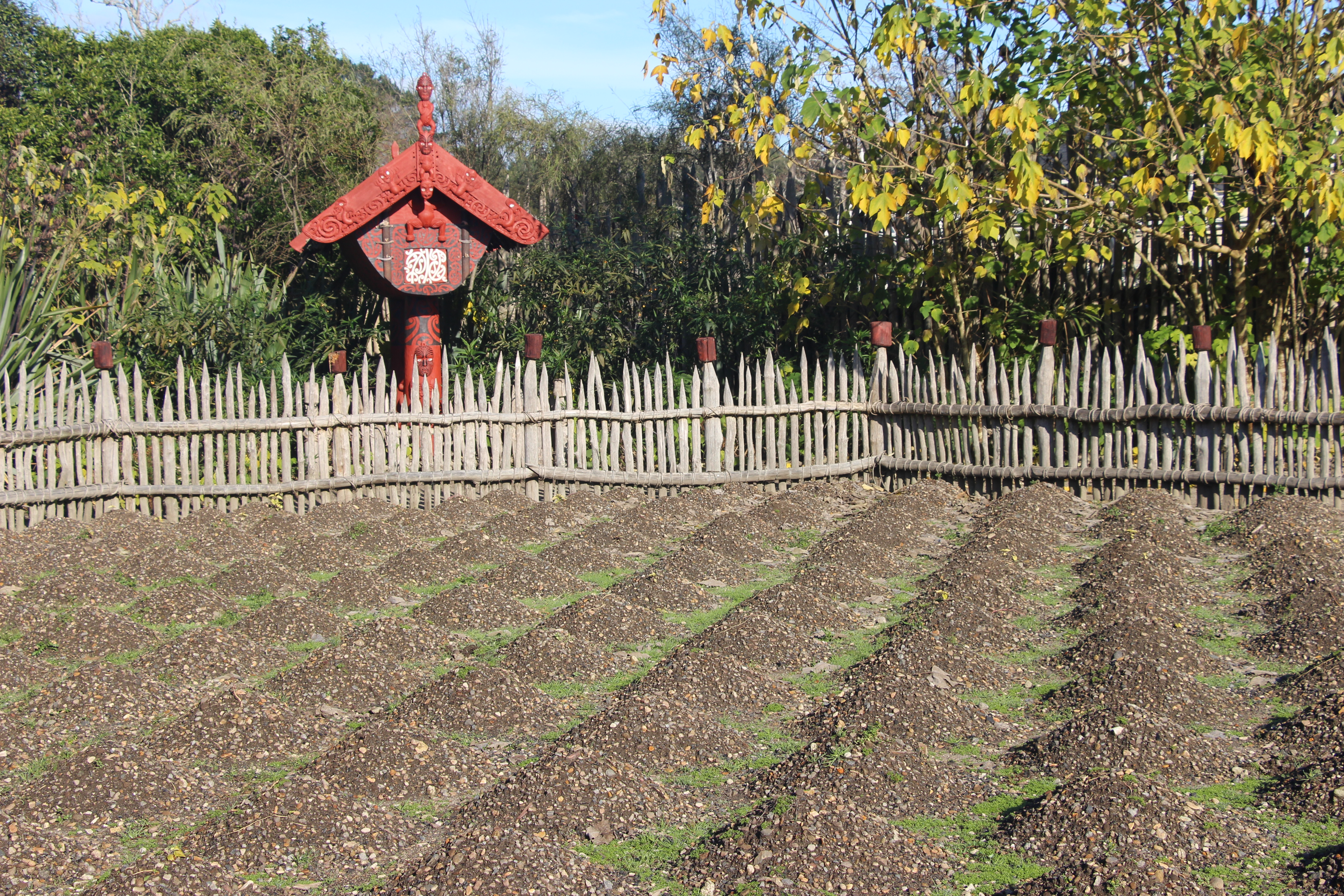
Rows of puke (earth mounds) for planting kūmara (Te Parapara in the Hamilton Gardens, Waikato)

Tōrere was already inhabited by Ngāitai, who became hostile to Ngāti Awa, after Tongarewa, son of Awatope of Ngāti Awa killed Te Whanaoterangi of Ngāitai. Penu of Ngāitai led a war party against Ngāti Awa and killed a man called Tukoukou, while he was out sowing kūmara seeds. Two men from the Waitaha iwi of Te Arawa, called Pohu and Matauaua, happened to be travelling through Tōrere at the time and they were accused of stealing the Tukoukou's remains from a canoe where they had been being stored. They were forced to flee. Later, another man from Te Arawa, called Te Aoterangi, was shipwrecked in the area, so Maruāhaira's son-in-law, Taiwhakaea killed him in revenge for the theft of Tukoukou's remains. Tamateapaia also led a war party to attack Te Arawa at Pakotore, but was defeated.

The tribe carried on to Whakatane. There, Rangihouhiri decided to conquer a pā just inland from Whakatane at Papaka. Rangihouhiri's brother, Tamapahore snuck up in the night to investigate Papaka's fortifications. As he was doing this he caught sight of a woman using the latrine, so he poked her from below with his taiaha spear. Since she was an elite lady, this seriously damaged relations between Rangihouhiri and the locals.

At this point, Maruāhaira led a contingent on to conquer Pukehina. Rangihouhiri led his people to assist Maruāhaira. Afterwards, he led his people on to Te Awa-a-te-Atua (near Matatā); they were again told to move on.

=== The conquest of Maketu ===
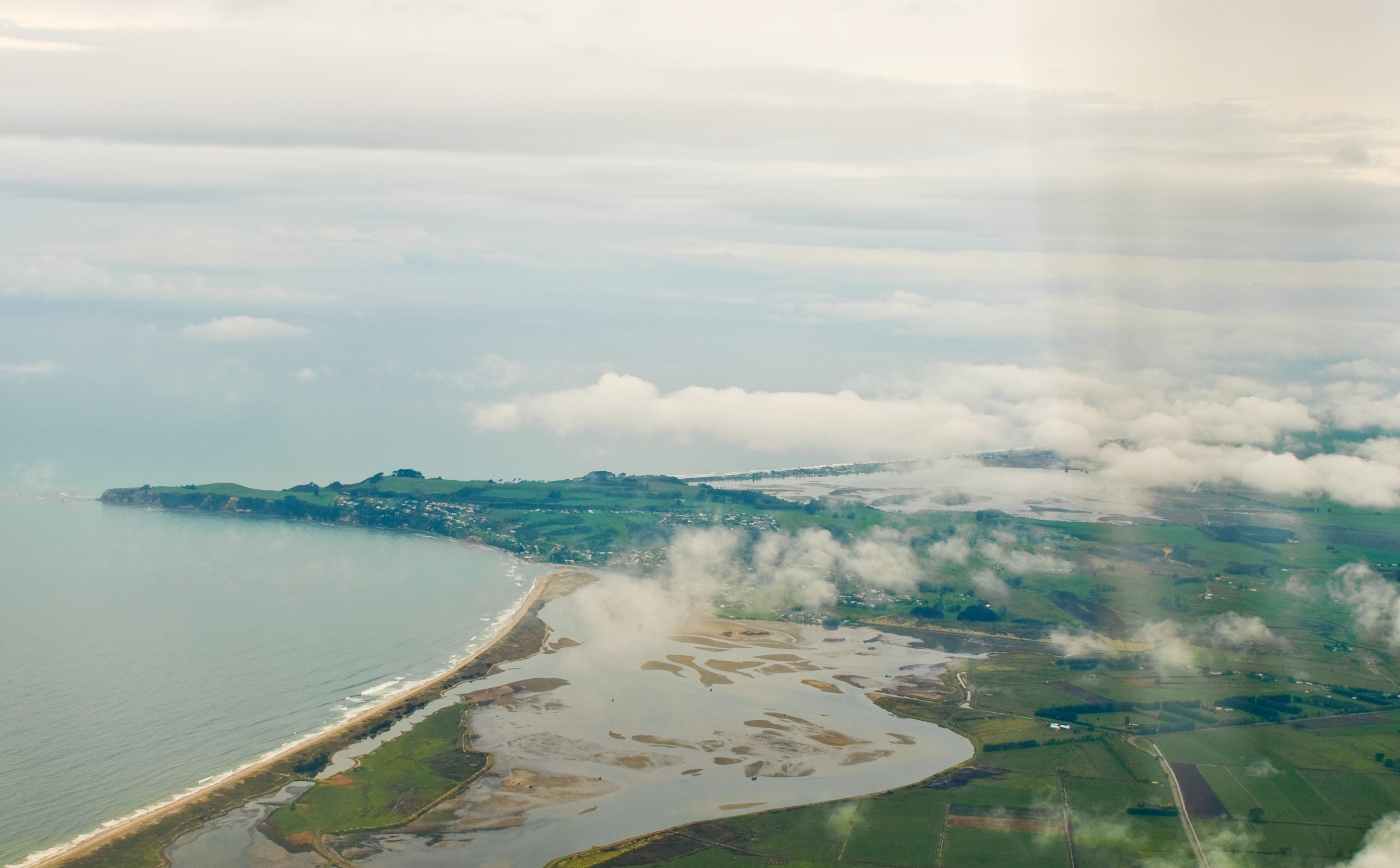
Maketu, seen from the west.

Rangihouhiri told Tamapahore to go to Maketu, where his aunt Torohangataringa had married a member of Tapuika, to visit Tatahau and Ngakohua, chiefs of Tapuika, and to investigate the land. When he reported back about its wealth, Rangihouhiri decided to conquer the territory. One version says that he pointed to the murder of Tukoukou as a justification for this. In another version, Ngakohua gave Rangihouhiri a pā called Owhara, on the coast to the east of Maketu, due to kinship ties between them.

The force set out to attack Maketu, pretending that they were on a fishing trip. As they approached Maketu, they came to a kūmara farm called Ohineahuru, where they encountered a woman called Punoho, daughter of Tatahau. They gang raped her and she insulted the last of the rapists, a disabled man named Werapinaki, which made him so angry that he killed her. This was done in order to spark a war. Tatahau was guided to Punoho's dead body by a hawk and sent Torohangataringa to find out who was responsible. Then a war party snuck into the Ngati Rangihouhiri camp during the night and assassinated Weapinaki.

Rangihouhiri now gathered all of his people on the edge of the Waihi estuary, just east of Maketu and prepared to invade. Tatahau's sons, Manu and Tiritiri, told him to flee from his base at Pukemaire, but he chose to remain and was killed when Rangihouhiri attacked and seized the pā. After this Rangihouhiri conquered Mokorangi, Mataitangaroa, and Huitaupoki. Manu and Tiritiri fled along the Whakapoukorero path to Otitoko, then to Waitangi, Muriwharau, Te Kahika, and Te Parapara, each of which Rangihouhiri captured. Finally, Manu and Tiritiri sought refuge in the Ngāti Moko fortress at Tauwharekiri. Rangihouhiri besieged this pā as well, but was unable to take it, so he gave up and turned back and consolidated his position at Maketu.

Manu and Tiritiri travelled to Waikato and convinced Kinonui, who was a powerful tohunga but had to be carried everywhere in a litter because he could not walk, to come to their aid. They also recruited allies from Tapuika and Waitaha. Meanwhile, Rangihouhiri went east to collect his own allies.

The allies marched on Maketu and captured Herekaki. Rangihouhiri's son Tutenaehe died defending the place and when Rangihouhiri heard about this he exclaimed haere e tama, mou tai po, motu tai ata ("you have gone by the evening tide; I will follow by the morning tide"), which proved a prophetic remark. The place where he said this received the name Whakapou Korero ("last words") as a result. The allies also took Pukemaire and killed its commander, Tamakahokino. The rest of Rangihouhiri's force fled to Owhara.

The next day, Ngāti Rangihouhiri, assisted by a war party from Ngāti Pukenga led by Kahukino and Te Tini o Awa, fought against Tapuika, Waitaha, and Waikato in a great battle on the edge of the Waihi estuary, known as the Battle of Poporohuamea. After much bloodshed, Rangihouhiri's forces were victorious and his opponents were forced to flee to the west, but Rangihouhiri himself was killed by Kaihamo of Waikato, who cut off his head and presented it to Tuparahaki of Waitaha, who had promised to marry whoever brought her Rangihouhiri's head. Nevertheless, Rangihouhiri's people had gained control of Maketu and they assumed the name Ngai te Rangi in his honour.

== Family ==
Rangihouhiri married Pukai and had several children:

- Tutengawhie
- Tapuiti
- Takoro
- Tuwhiwhia, who was captured and killed by Waitaha and Ngāti Ranginui while gathering toetoe at Otaiparia.

- Tauaiti, captured and killed with his father
- Kotorerua
- Tuwera, who married Putangimaru, a prominent tohunga in Waikato.

- Turourou
- Tamawhariua
- Tutenaehe, who was killed defending Herekaki, during the conquest of Maketu.

== Bibliography ==
- Stafford, D.M. (1967). Te Arawa: A History of the Arawa People. Rotorua, New Zealand: A.H. & A.W. Reed.
- Steedman, J.A.W. (1984). Ngā Ohaaki o ngā Whānau o Tauranga Moana: Māori History and Genealogy of the Bay of Plenty.
