= Papamoa =

Suburb of Tauranga, New Zealand

Papamoa Māori: Te Rae o Pāpāmoa
- Suburb
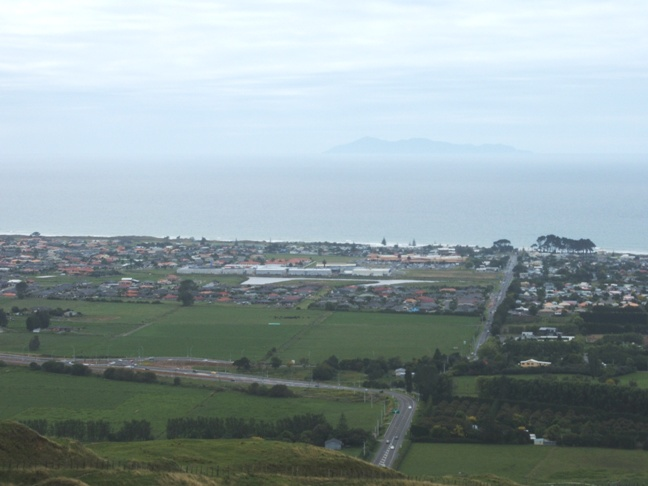
- Looking towards Mayor Island down Domain Rd from the Papamoa Hills
- Interactive map of Papamoa; Māori: Te Rae o Pāpāmoa
- Coordinates: 37°44′S 176°18′E
- Country: New Zealand
- City: Tauranga
- Local authority: Tauranga City Council
- Electoral ward: Arataki General Ward; Pāpāmoa General Ward

Area
  - Land: 2,580 ha (6,400 acres)

Population (June 2025)
  - Total: 37,910
  - Density: 1,470/km^{2} (3,810/sq mi)

Arataki	(Bay of Plenty)	Mōtītī Island
Kairua	Papamoa
Kaitemako	Otawa, Te Puke	Maketu

Papamoa or Papamoa Beach is a suburb of Tauranga, located about 11 kilometres from the city centre. It is the largest residential suburb in Tauranga. It is bordered to the west by Arataki and Mount Maunganui (east of Sunrise Avenue and Hibiscus Avenue), the east by the Kaituna River (separating it from the Western Bay of Plenty District) and to the south by State Highway 2.

Papamoa has 16 km (9.9 mi) of white sandy beach stretching from the boundary with Mount Maunganui in the west to the Kaituna River in the east.

== History and culture ==
Māori settlement of Papamoa dates back to approximately 1400 CE with a significant pā complex overlooking the fertile plains and abundant coastal fisheries. For the next 300 years the people prospered, harvesting their crops and fisheries, occupying and abandoning sites in accordance with the kūmara cycle and soil fertility.

After Ngai Te Rangi conquered Mount Maunganui, the area was settled by Tamapahore, who had quarrelled with his nephew Kotorerua, the leader of the tribe. His descendants became Nga Potiki a Tamapahore.

Widespread Pākehā settlement of the area did not start until the early 1960s and prior to this Papamoa had been largely a rural area. Once a small and tight knit community, many of Papamoa Beach's sweeping paddocks have been swallowed up by urban development.

In subsequent decades, Papamoa is currently one of the fastest growing suburbs of Tauranga, with many different subdivisions developing concurrently on different blocks of land on the fringes of the suburb. It is popular for fishing, surfing, and as a holiday retreat.

=== Marae ===
The local Mangatawa or Tamapahore Marae and its Tamapahore meeting house is a meeting place for the Ngāi Te Rangi hapū of Ngā Pōtiki.

=== Nudity ===
Papamoa Beach is a clothing-optional beach by custom. New Zealand has no official nude beaches, as public nudity is legal on any beach where it is "known to occur". Sexual activity in public places is illegal, however, and Papamoa Beach has been the site of a continuing series of complaints about lewd behaviour. Some complainants take care to distinguish between these activities and non-sexual naturism; others do not.

In 2012, Papamoa Beach was the location for a skinny dipping world record attempt. On 2 December 2012, 299 people got naked in the water. Despite a cold day, many people stripped naked attempting to beat Christchurch's Summer Beach Dip. The record failed as Guinness World Records required all swimmers to be in the water at the same time for a group photo.

== Name issues ==
The suburban area of "Papamoa" as it is commonly referred to today is actually situated at "Papamoa Beach." Strictly geographically speaking, "Papamoa" is actually located closer inland towards the Papamoa Hills, in an area covered by the Western Bay of Plenty District Council. Papamoa (situated at Papamoa Beach) can be split into two areas: Papamoa East and Papamoa West. Legally speaking, Domain Road separates Papamoa West from Papamoa East, although to many locals Papamoa East starts on the Eastern side of Parton Road. Papamoa East (of Parton Road) in the 1970s and 1980s used to be seen as more of an alternative place to live, a bit like the Coromandel Peninsula.

== Demographics ==
Papamoa Beach covers 25.80 km^{2} (9.96 sq mi) and had an estimated population of 37,910 as of June 2025, with a population density of 1,469 people per km^{2}.

Historical population
Year	Pop.	±% p.a.
2006	16,176	—
2013	20,319	+3.31%
2018	27,390	+6.15%
2023	34,533	+4.74%
The 2006 population is for a smaller area of 23.92 km^{2}. Source:

Papamoa Beach had a population of 34,533 in the 2023 New Zealand census, an increase of 7,143 people (26.1%) since the 2018 census, and an increase of 14,214 people (70.0%) since the 2013 census. There were 16,638 males, 17,820 females, and 81 people of other genders in 12,369 dwellings. 2.2% of people identified as LGBTIQ+. The median age was 38.7 years (compared with 38.1 years nationally). There were 7,290 people (21.1%) aged under 15 years, 5,493 (15.9%) aged 15 to 29, 15,246 (44.1%) aged 30 to 64, and 6,504 (18.8%) aged 65 or older.

People could identify as more than one ethnicity. The results were 81.7% European (Pākehā); 18.1% Māori; 3.5% Pasifika; 8.9% Asian; 2.6% Middle Eastern, Latin American and African New Zealanders (MELAA); and 1.9% other, which includes people giving their ethnicity as "New Zealander". English was spoken by 95.9%, Māori by 3.7%, Samoan by 0.4%, and other languages by 12.9%. No language could be spoken by 2.2% (e.g. too young to talk). New Zealand Sign Language was known by 0.4%. The percentage of people born overseas was 26.7, compared with 28.8% nationally.

Religious affiliations were 28.1% Christian, 1.3% Hindu, 0.2% Islam, 1.0% Māori religious beliefs, 0.4% Buddhist, 0.4% New Age, 0.1% Jewish, and 4.1% other religions. People who answered that they had no religion were 57.7%, and 6.8% of people did not answer the census question.

Of those at least 15 years old, 6,231 (22.9%) people had a bachelor's or higher degree, 14,499 (53.2%) had a post-high school certificate or diploma, and 6,513 (23.9%) people exclusively held high school qualifications. The median income was $42,400, compared with $41,500 nationally. 3,300 people (12.1%) earned over $100,000 compared to 12.1% nationally. The employment status of those at least 15 was 13,617 (50.0%) full-time, 3,789 (13.9%) part-time, and 756 (2.8%) unemployed.

Individual statistical areas
Name	Area (km^{2})	Population	Density (per km^{2})	Dwellings	Median age	Median income
Pacific Lakes	1.34	2,931	2,187	1,260	52.7 years	$38,900
Pacific View	1.16	3,111	2,682	1,116	42.0 years	$42,000
Palm Beach North	1.09	3,270	3,000	1,068	34.8 years	$42,800
Palm Beach South-Gravatt	2.39	3,786	1,585	1,479	52.6 years	$37,400
Papamoa Beach North	1.40	2,763	1,974	978	36.3 years	$43,200
Doncaster	2.89	3,477	1,203	1,146	36.5 years	$41,400
Papamoa Beach South	1.38	2,685	1,946	1,041	41.0 years	$40,700
Motiti	1.25	3,354	2,683	1,137	40.4 years	$46,200
Wairakei West	1.59	3,072	1,932	1,056	31.9 years	$45,200
Wairakei Central	1.37	1,719	1,255	594	38.1 years	$48,800
Wairakei East-Te Tumu	9.94	4,356	438	1,503	33.7 years	$44,500
New Zealand					38.1 years	$41,500

== Economy ==
Papamoa Beach has a large shopping area located to the west of Domain Road,. There is a small section of industrial activity located to the east of Parton Road.

=== Retail ===
Papamoa Plaza is the suburb’s primary retail centre, originally opened in 1997 (as Palm Beach Plaza). It covers approximately 14,120 m² and provides over 650 car parks, anchored by major tenants such as Woolworths and The Warehouse, with around 40 stores and a range of food, fashion, lifestyle and service-oriented outlets. Recent plans are underway to expand the centre with a new large-format retail development adjacent to the main carpark that is expected to accommodate up to eight additional retailers and further parking, with construction scheduled for completion by mid-2026.

Fashion Island is a factory-outlet and specialty shopping precinct located at 42 Gravatt Road. Opened in 2006, it hosts a range of national and international fashion and accessory brands.

In addition to these established centres, The Sands Pāpāmoa Beach is a large mixed-use town centre under development in Pāpāmoa East. Stage one of the project opened in late 2024 with a supermarket and several smaller retail and hospitality outlets, and further stages including expanded commercial space are scheduled to open in 2026.

== Education ==
Pāpāmoa College is a state secondary school for Year 7 to 13 students, established in 2011, with a roll of 1,869.

Te Kura Kaupapa Māori o Te Kura Kokiri is a Māori language immersion composite school for Year 1 to 13. with a roll of 264.

Papamoa has several state primary schools for Year 1 to 6 students:

- Pāpāmoa Primary School was established in 1904 and moved to its current location in 1977. It has a roll of 582.
- Golden Sands School, established in 2011, has a roll of 496.
- Te Manawa ō Pāpāmoa School, established in 2022, has a roll of 491.
- Tahatai Coast School, established in 1996, has a roll of 785.
- Te Akau ki Papamoa Primary School, established in 2000, has a roll of 492. The school originally took Year 1 to 8, but removed Year 7 and 8 when Pāpāmoa College opened.

Suzanne Aubert Catholic School is a state integrated Catholic primary school which opened in 2021. It has a roll of 212.

All these schools are co-educational. Rolls are as of July 2026.

== Transport ==
Public transport in Papamoa Beach solely consists of bus services. The suburb is served by three 'Bay Hopper' routes; Route 30 (Mount Maunganui - Papamoa ), Route 33 (Tauranga - Papamoa via the Harbour Bridge), and Route 36 (Tauranga - Papamoa via Maungatapu Bridge).

== Gallery ==
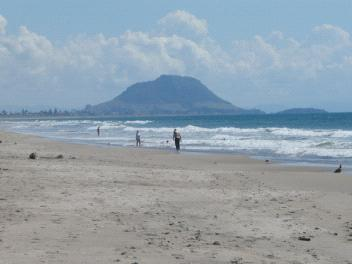
Mt Maunganui from Papamoa Beach

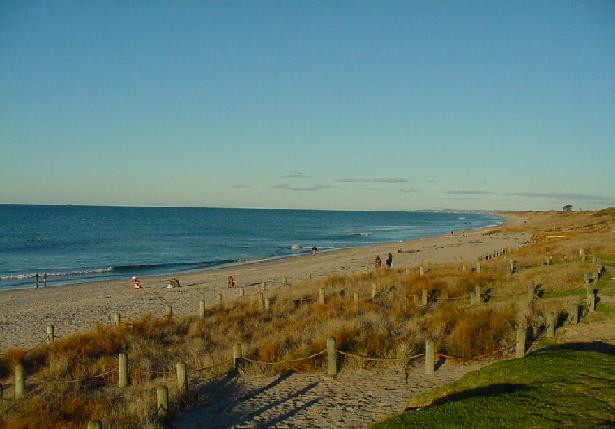
Papamoa Beach from the Papamoa Domain

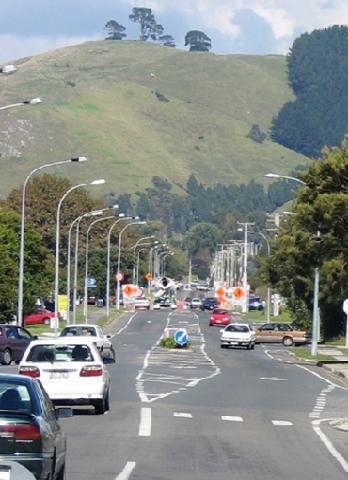
The Papamoa Hills from Domain Rd

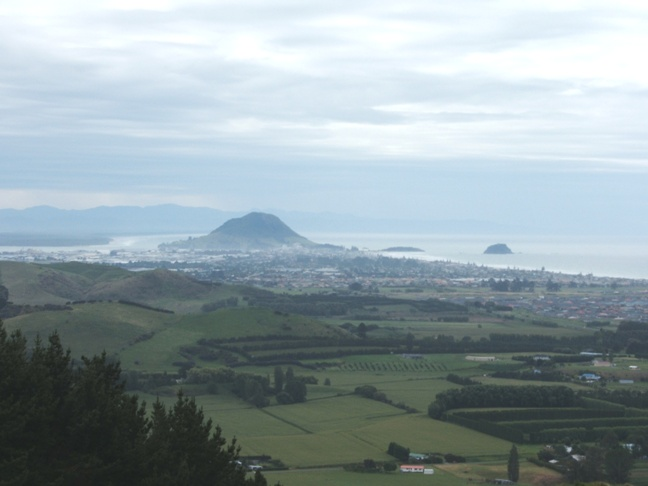
Looking towards Mt Maunganui from the Papamoa Hills

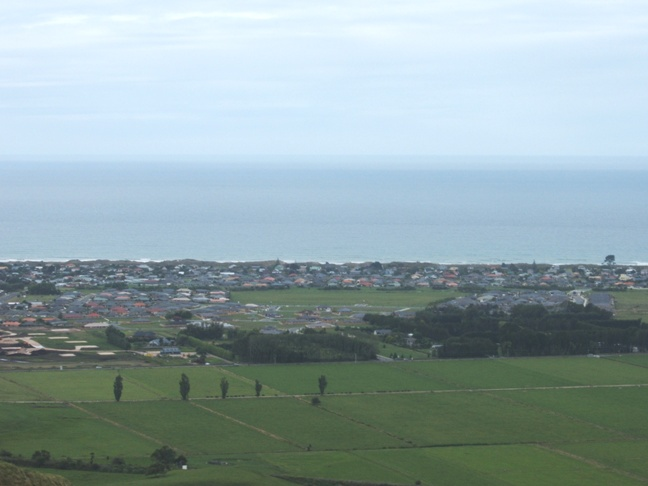
Looking down at Papamoa from the top of the Papamoa Hills

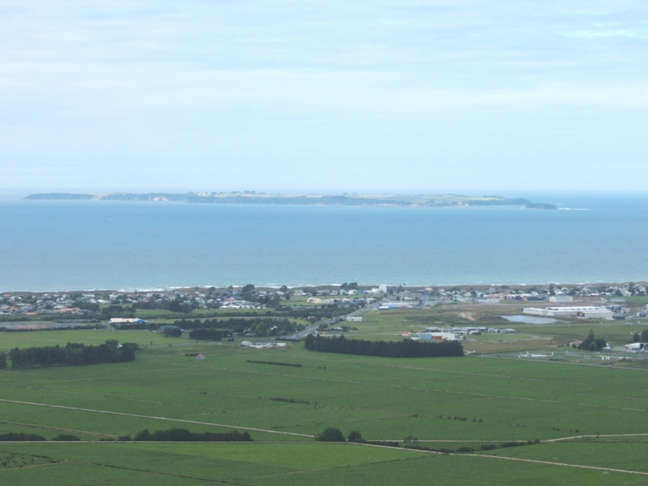
Looking towards Parton Rd and Motiti Island from the Papamoa Hills
