= Dorothy Sample =

American politician (1911–2002)

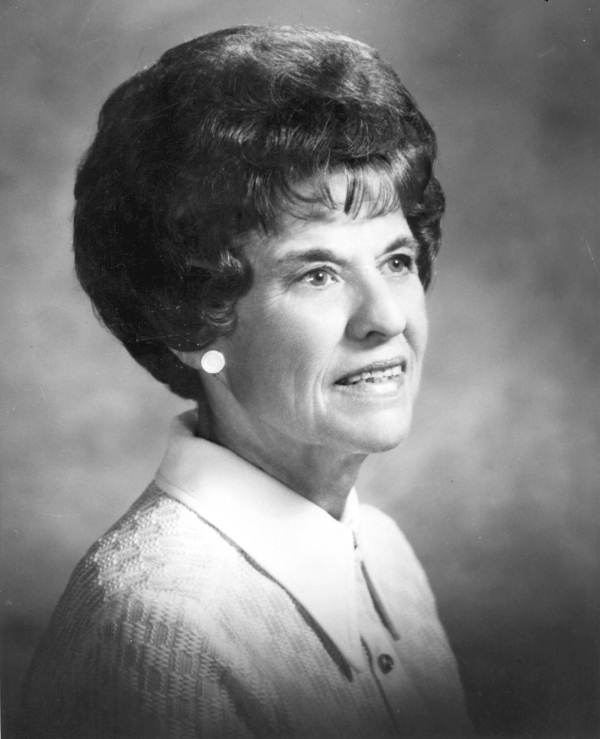

Member of the Florida House of Representatives
- In office November 2, 1976 – November 8, 1988
- Preceded by: Laurent Belanger
- Succeeded by: Lars Hafner
- Constituency: 61st district (1976–1982); 54th district (1982–1988)

Personal details
- Born: May 1, 1911 Nyack, New York
- Died: September 1, 2002 (aged 91) Tampa, Florida
- Party: Republican
- Spouse: Richard Lardner Sample
- Children: 3
- Education: St. Petersburg Junior College; Duke University (B.A.)
- Occupation: Teacher, attorney

Dorothy Eaton Sample (May 1, 1911 – September 1, 2002) was a Republican politician from Florida who served as a member of the Florida House of Representatives from 1976 to 1988.

== Early life ==
Sample was born in Nyack, New York. Her mother was Olive B. Eaton, a teacher. She had a brother, Ted, and a sister, Mary. She was a descendant of John Eaton, a territorial governor, and two of her cousins, Dan and John McCarty, were also Florida politicians. Sample received her undergraduate degree in economics from Duke University and her law degree from Duke Law School. She received a license to practice law in North Carolina. She moved from Nashville, Tennessee, to St. Petersburg, Florida, in 1948.

She held various jobs while in Pinellas County, including as a teacher, a law clerk and legal secretary and a department manager for an auto finance company. She was on the Florida State Children's Commission and wrote regulations for the county's License Board for Children's Centers and Family Day Care Homes. She ran unsuccessful campaigns for the local school board in 1972 and the legislature in 1974.

Sample founded the Alliance for Conservation of Natural Resources, served as president of Save Our Bays and was a vice president and regional director for the Florida Wildlife Federation. She led a legal effort to halt construction of Interstate 275 in St. Petersburg until an environmental impact statement was commissioned. For her environmental work, she received the Outstanding Conservationist Award of the Rod and Gun Club and the Florida Wildlife Special Service Award.

== Political career ==
In the 1976 state elections, Sample was first elected to the Florida House of Representatives for the 61st district. She defeated Laurent Belanger for the Republican nomination. After the election, she prefiled two dozen bills before the opening of the 1977 legislative session, one of which would have required auto inspectors to have a "pleasant disposition". She was actively involved in environmental issues, having opposed local dredge-and-fill efforts before being elected to the legislature. In the 1978 state elections, she received 62,401 votes, compared to the 45,932 votes received by her Democratic opponent Don O'Leary. In the 1980 legislative session, Sample opposed a bill to criminalize marital rape, the only female representative to do so.

Sample became a representative for the 54th district in 1982. She was the oldest member of the House. In the 1988 state elections, she lost her seat to Democrat Lars Hafner, who had previously challenged her in 1986. In the subsequent elections two years later, she lost again to Hafner, receiving 12,925 votes compared to his 21,225. She ran for a seat on the St. Petersburg City Council in 1995 but was not elected.

== Personal life ==
Sample was married to Richard L., a banker and real estate appraiser who died in 1985. The couple had three children: Richard, Dorothy and Dianne.

== Death ==
Sample died on September 1, 2002, at the H. Lee Moffitt Cancer Center in Tampa, Florida. She was 91. Her papers are held in the Southern Women Legislators Collection at the University of Mississippi.
