= Sallye Mathis =

Politician and civil rights leader

Sallye Mathis

Sallye Brooks Mathis (1912 - 1982) was a teacher and civil rights activist in Jacksonville, Florida who served as an elected official in local government along with Mary Singleton. She served on Jacksonville's city council for 15 years. Sallye B. Mathis Elementary School is named for her, and she was inducted into the Florida Civil Rights Hall of Fame in 2015.

== Life and career ==
Mathis was born in Jacksonville, Florida to parents Sallie Garrett (née Adams) and Henry Pickens Brooks. She grew up in the area, attending local schools. In 1930, she graduated from the Stanton Institute, a school in Jacksonville. She later attended Benedict College in South Carolina, and Bethune-Cookman College in Florida. In 1945, she graduated from Tuskegee Institute with a Bachelor of Science in education. In 1955, she graduated from Florida A & M University with a master's degree in secondary education.

She was a teacher in the Duval County School System, including at Stanton Junior High School, and continued to teach in public schools for more than 25 years. She additionally worked as a school counselor, and was also the girl's dean at Matthew V. Gilbert Junior-Senior High School. After her husband's death, Mathis retired from schoolwork in 1962.

After her retirement, she started to commit herself fully to community service and activist issues. She was a member of the NAACP and the League of Women Voters. She participated in civil rights marches, and as part of the League of Women Voters, she attended city council meetings. Alongside Wendell Holmes, she worked on the issue of school desegregation. She integrated the Jacksonville YWCA and their board of leaders. She was also an organizer for the Jacksonville Opportunities Industrial Council, and founded the Jacksonville Minority Women's Coalition.

In 1966, Mathis organized an NAACP voter-registration drive. A year later, she won the first annual Pearson Award from the Florida branch of the NAACP. Mathis was also involved in the NAACP Youth Council.

=== City Council ===
Fellow NAACP members encouraged Mathis to run for a city council seat in Jacksonville. After deciding to run, Mathis' campaign platform focused on the idea of "one-government". She suggested that a change in city council would be better for black voters, who made up 40% of the vote in Jacksonville. She also won favor with white constituents, including in predominantly white precincts.

Mathis ran against incumbent city council member Barney Cobb in the primary election on June 6, 1967. She won the Democratic nomination for Ward 3, beating Cobb with 19,260 to his 16,872 votes. On the June 20th general election, Mathis ran against Republican Theodore Forsyth Jr. for Ward 3 and won with 19,416 to 14,528 votes.

The general election took place after a grand jury indictment for various corruption charges were brought against eight Jacksonville officials. Once the city council election ended, it was considered a "sweep"; Democrats were elected in all 7 of the contested races, and the election ended with 8 of 9 incumbent members being replaced on the city council.

In 1967, Mathis and Mary Singleton became the first women to sit on the Jacksonville City Council, as well as the first black members of the council since 1907. After the election, Mathis was selected to be on the council's City Pardon Board.

In 1977, she was one of the Florida delegates for the National Women's Conference. Mathis continued to serve on the Jacksonville City Council until her death in 1982.

== Legacy ==
The Jacksonville Branch of the NAACP named a community service award after Mathis. The Sallye B. Mathis Elementary School was also named in honor of Mathis.

In 2015, she was posthumously inducted into the Florida Civil Rights Hall of Fame.
