= Hugh Paul Nuckolls =

American politician (1941–2023)

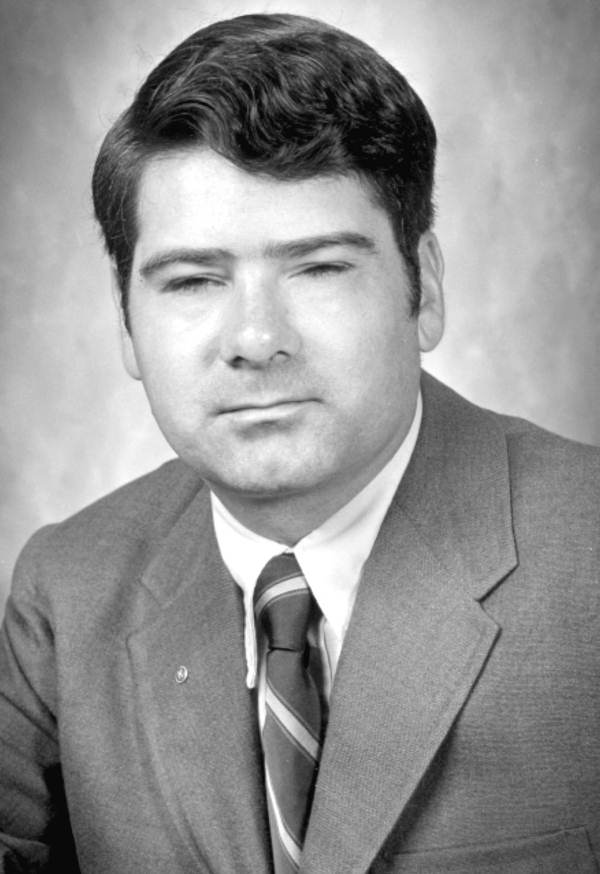

Member of the Florida House of Representatives from the 91st district
- In office 1972–1982

Personal details
- Born: October 3, 1941 Hendersonville, North Carolina, U.S.
- Died: April 15, 2023 (aged 81)
- Party: Republican
- Education: Mars Hill College, Cumberland School of Law
- Occupation: attorney

Hugh Paul Nuckolls (October 3, 1941 – April 15, 2023) was a politician in the American state of Florida. He served in the Florida House of Representatives from 1972 to 1982, representing the 91st district.
