= Tom Bush (politician) =

American politician

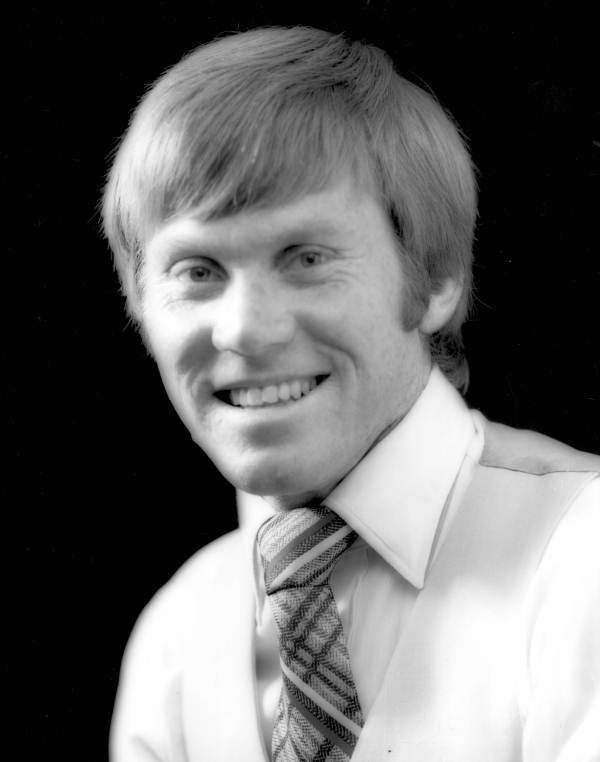

Member of the Florida House of Representatives from the 84th district
- In office 1978–1982

Personal details
- Born: March 16, 1948 (age 78) Daytona Beach, Florida, U.S.
- Party: Republican
- Education: Florida State University, University of Tennessee
- Occupation: attorney

Thomas J. Bush (born March 16, 1948) is a politician and lawyer in the American state of Florida. He served in the Florida House of Representatives from 1978 to 1982, representing the 84th district.
