= Frank Messersmith =

American politician

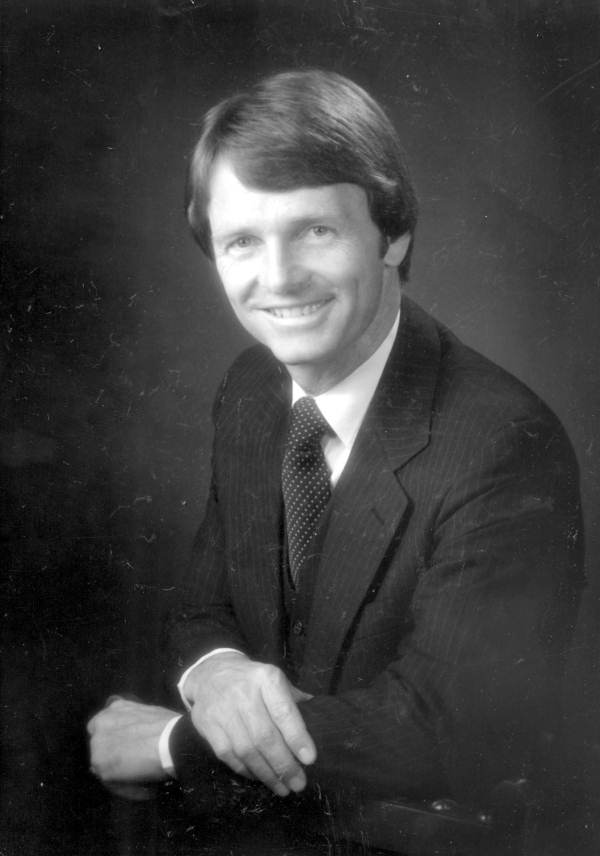
- Messersmith in 1984

Member of the Florida House of Representatives
- In office 1980–1990

Personal details
- Born: October 5, 1942 (age 83) Springfield, Illinois, U.S.
- Party: Republican
- Education: Southern Illinois University
- Occupation: attorney, lobbyist

Frank S. Messersmith (born October 5, 1942) is an American politician in the state of Florida.

Messersmith was born in Springfield, Illinois. An attorney, he served in the Florida House of Representatives for the 85th district from 1980 to 1990, as a Republican.
