= Eleanor Weinstock =

American politician (1929–2023)

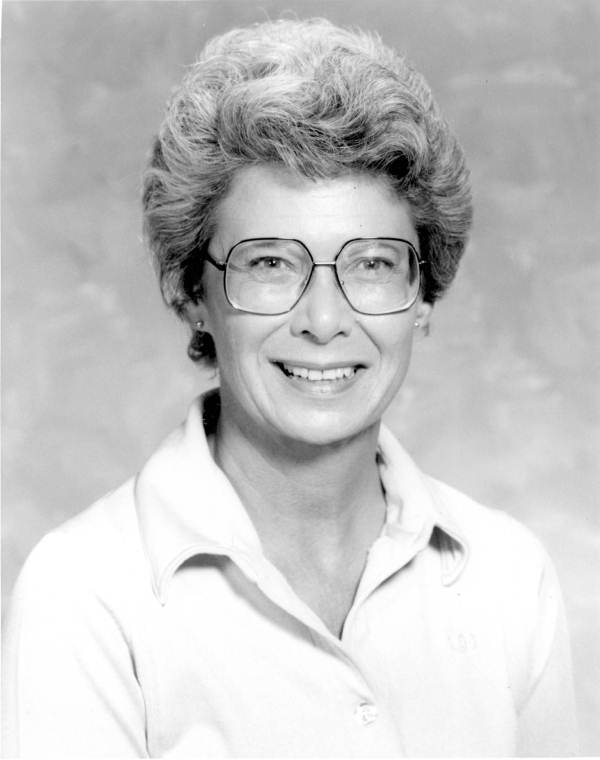

Member of the Florida House of Representatives
- In office 1978–1986

Personal details
- Born: January 25, 1929 New York City, New York, U.S.
- Died: August 19, 2023 (aged 94)
- Party: Democratic
- Children: 3
- Education: Skidmore College

Eleanor Frank Weinstock (January 25, 1929 – August 19, 2023) was an American politician in the state of Florida.

Weinstock served in the Florida House of Representatives from 1978 to 1986 (83rd district). She also served in the Florida Senate from 1987 to 1992.

Weinstock lived in Palm Beach, Florida. On August 19, 2023, she died of complications from Parkinson's disease, at the age of 94.
