= Walter C. Young =

American politician (1922–2016)

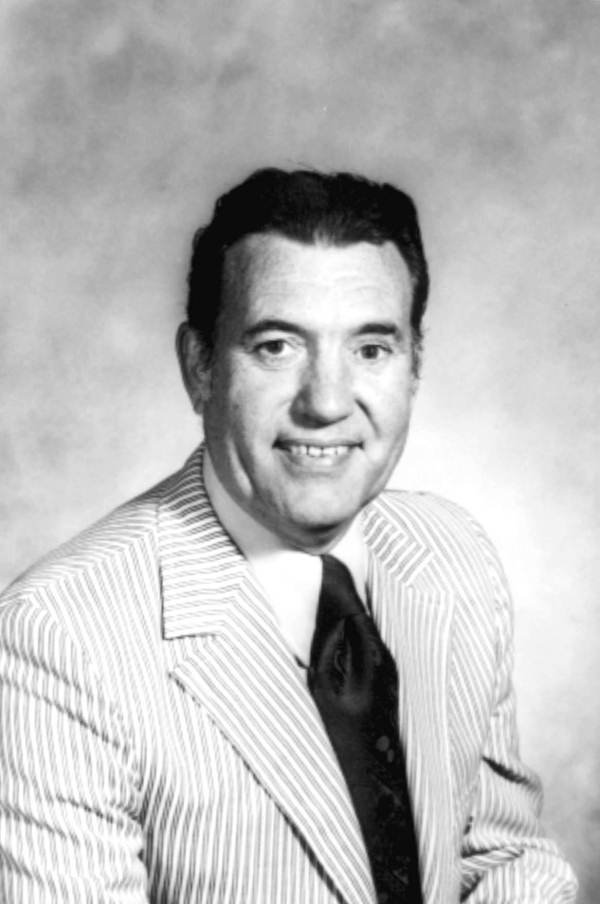
- Walter C. Young, 1972

Member of the Florida House of Representatives
- In office 1972–1992

Member of the Pembroke Pines City Council
- In office 1962–1964

Personal details
- Born: March 2, 1922 Rochester, New York
- Died: August 6, 2016 (aged 94) Tallahassee, Florida
- Education: Niagara University; Barry University; University of Miami

Walter Croston "Walt" Young (March 2, 1922 – August 6, 2016) was an American educator and politician.

== Background ==
Born in Rochester, New York, Young served in the United States Army Air Corps, in the Pacific, during World War II. He then received a B.S. degree from Niagara University, 1949; an M.S. degree from Barry University, 1957; an Ed.D. degree from the University of Miami, 1965. Young was elected to the Pembroke Pines City Council in 1962 and served on the Broward Community College Board of Trustees, 1971–1976. In 1972, Young was elected to the Florida House of Representatives as a Democrat. He served ten consecutive terms until his retirement in 1992. Upon retirement from the Florida House, he was appointed to the Florida Department of Elder Affairs State Advisory Board. Young died on August 6, 2016, at the age of 94.

== Legacy ==
Because of his service to the city of Pembroke Pines, the community named its middle school after him; Walter C. Young Middle School and Resource Center opened its doors in early 1991.
