= Jim Foster (politician) =

American politician

Trooper Jim Foster
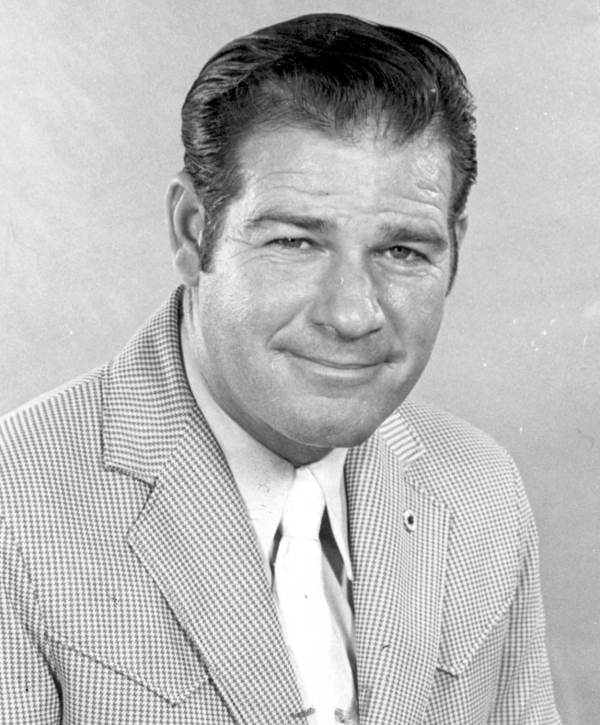
- Foster in 1972

Member of the Florida House of Representatives from the 65th district
- In office 1972–1982
- Preceded by: T. Terrell Sessums
- Succeeded by: Elvin Martinez

Personal details
- Died: July 5, 1996 (aged 62) Missouri, U.S.
- Party: Democratic

James "Trooper Jim" Foster (died July 5, 1996) was an American politician. He served as a Democratic member for the 65th district of the Florida House of Representatives.

== Life and career ==
Foster was a highway patrol trooper.

In 1972, Foster was elected to represent the 65th district of the Florida House of Representatives, succeeding T. Terrell Sessums. He served until 1982, when he was succeeded by Elvin Martinez.

Foster died in July 1996 in Missouri, at the age of 62.
