= John T. Ware =

American politician

John T. Ware (November 14, 1931 - August 20, 2005) was a city planner, real estate agent, district attorney, state legislator in Florida. He served in the Florida Senate. He served in the U.S. Navy and was a pilot.

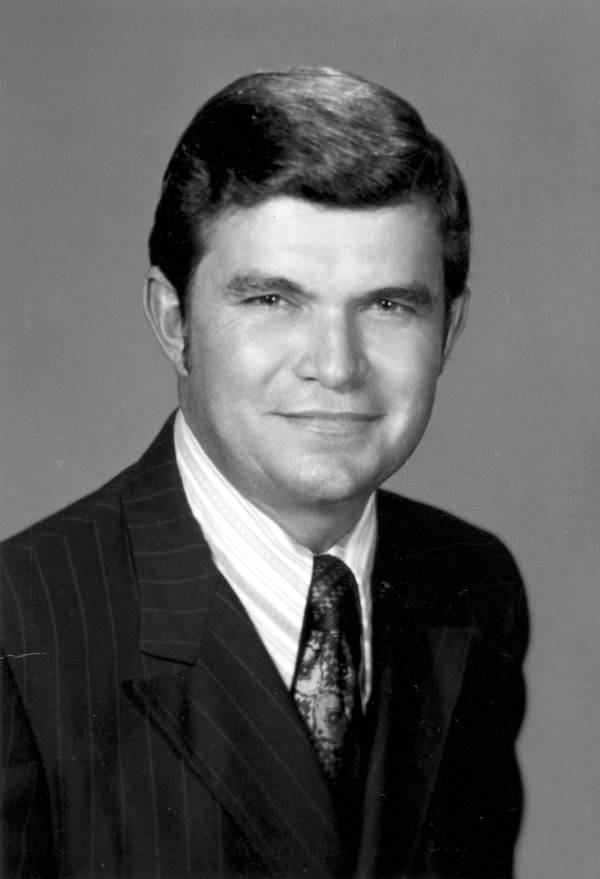
Ware in 1972

He was born in Chattanooga, Tennessee. He graduated from the University of Florida and Stetson College of Law.

Ware was first elected to the Florida legislature in 1964 as a Democrat. He then made two runs for the state senate before being re-elected to the Florida House of Representatives in 1968 as a Republican. He then tried again for the senate and was elected to the Florida State Senate in 1970 where he served for twelve years before losing to Jeanne Malchon.

He married Doris Elizabeth Gregory in 1957 and they had five children.

He died August 20, 2005 in the hospice at the Palms of Pasadena Hospital from complications arising from Parkinson's disease.
