= John J. Considine =

American politician

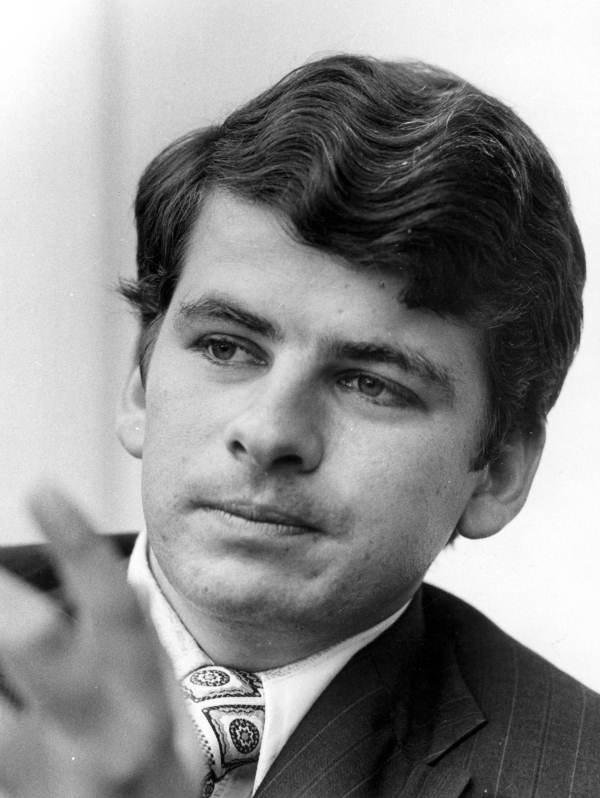

Member of the Florida House of Representatives
- In office 1974–1978

Senior Minister of the Unity Church
- In office 1998–Present

Personal details
- Born: July 18, 1948 (age 78) Detroit, Michigan, U.S.
- Profession: Minister

John J. Considine III (born July 18, 1948) is an American former politician and attorney. Considine is an ordained Unity minister teaching the universal laws for peace and a successful life (including the Law of Attraction popularized by the movie The Secret). Considine served as an elected member of the Florida House of Representatives from 1974 to 1978. He was a prime sponsor of the Florida's Generic Drug Act of 1978 and served as Vice-Chair of the House Committee on Tourism and Economic Development. In 1978 Considine ran for a seat in the U.S. House of Representatives being vacated by Congressman Paul Rogers but lost the Democratic primary.

Born in 1948 in Detroit, Michigan, Considine graduated from Villanova University in 1970 and from the University of Florida College of Law in 1974. In 1996 he retired from the practice of law and entered seminary at Unity Village. He was ordained a minister in 1998. Influences on his life and teaching include Unity Church, est, the Landmark Forum, yoga and meditation; as well as the Anonymous fellowships and the work of Bill W. Presently he serves as senior minister of the Spiritual Life Center of Midtown Detroit.

John Considine's acting credits in community theater include "On the Town" performed at the Minack Theatre, Cornwall, England; and 42nd Street at the Lake Worth Playhouse; "Free To Be You and Me" at the Royal Palm Dinner Theatre; and numerous commercials.

According to the website of Detroit Unity Temple: "Reverend John Considine draws upon a lifetime of experiences in business, theater, public life, parenthood and relationships to make the Sunday message practical and relevant for our lives. His wisdom is born of spiritual study, meditation and, as he says "a wealth of hard knocks… I've been on top of the mountain on some days, and on other days, the mountain's been on top of me!" John's messages are stimulating, uplifting and entertaining. No one falls asleep in church here at Unity! We teach an empowering metaphysical interpretation of Scripture that is geared to bring out the best in us all week long. It's "practical spirituality" and we discover spiritual tools regarding health, wealth, well-being and peace of mind."

Considine is the grandson of John J. Considine Sr. who served as Superintendent of Parks & Recreation in the City of Detroit, Michigan from 1946 to 1962 building hundreds of parks in that city and who was appointed a founding member of the President's Council on Physical Fitness and Sports by President Dwight Eisenhower. A popular recreation center in the inner city of Detroit bears his name. Considine is also a grandson of Luigi Tassi, Detroit artist of the 1920s and 1930s, now deceased.
