= Donald Crane =

American politician

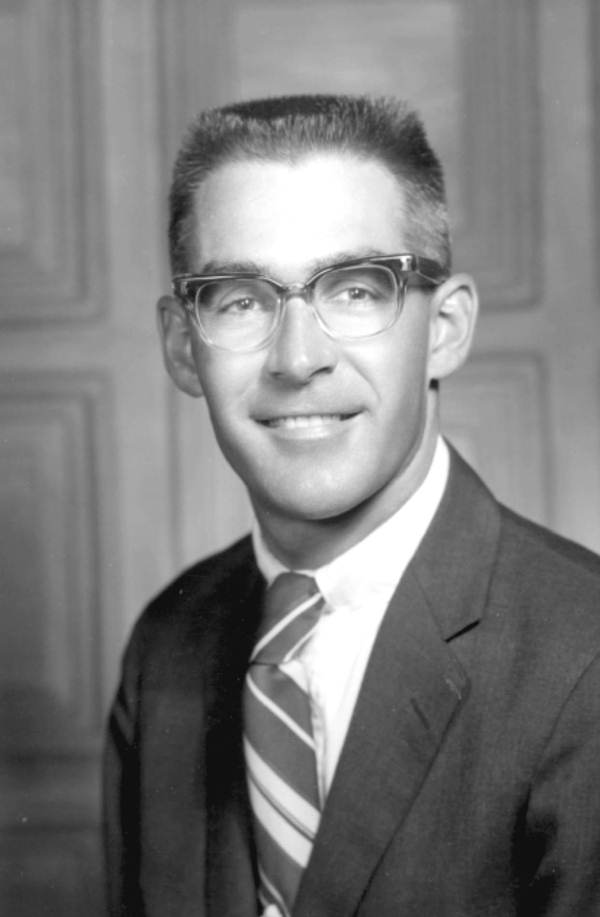

Member of the Florida House of Representatives for the 61st district
- In office 1973–1974

Member of the Florida House of Representatives from the 52nd district
- In office 1971

Personal details
- Born: Donald Reynolds Crane, Jr. February 5, 1934 (age 92) Summit, New Jersey
- Party: Republican
- Occupation: insurance executive

Donald Reynolds Crane, Jr. (born February 5, 1934) is an American former politician in the state of Florida.

Crane was born in Summit, New Jersey. An insurance executive, he is an alumnus of the University of North Carolina. He served as a Republican in the Florida House of Representatives from 1973 to 1974, representing the 61st district. He previously briefly served the 52nd district in 1971.
