= Tāme Iti =

Māori activist and artist (born 1952)

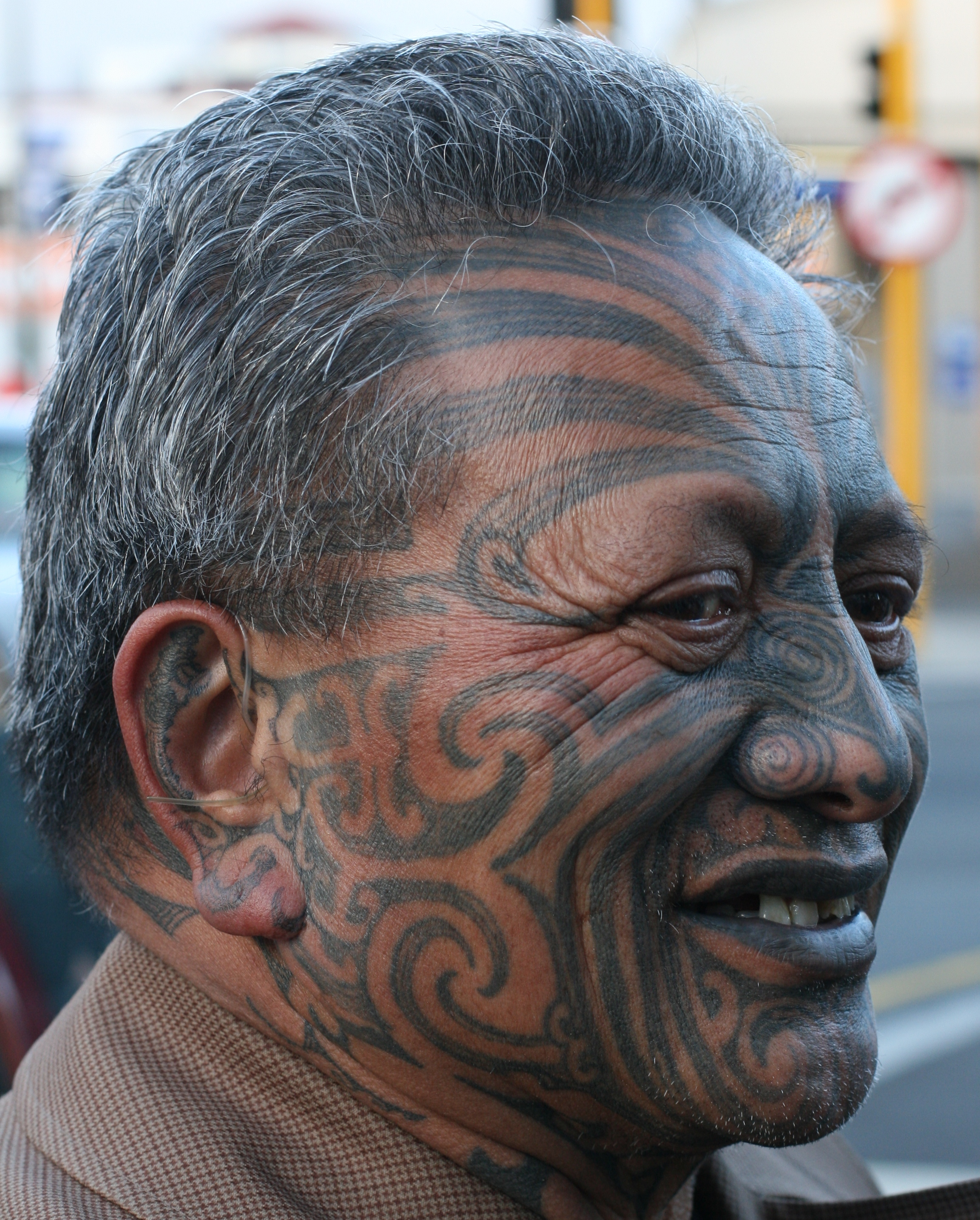
- Iti in 2009
- Born: Tāme Wairere Iti; 1952 (age 73–74); Rotorua, Bay of Plenty, New Zealand
- Occupations: Activist; artist; social worker
- Years active: 1972–present
- Political party: Māori Party
- Spouse: Ann Fletcher (before 1980)
- Partner: Maria Steens (since 1997)
- Children: 3
- Awards: Arts Foundation Laureate Award

Tāme Wairere Iti (born 1952) is a New Zealand Māori activist, artist, actor and social worker. Of Ngāi Tūhoe descent, Iti rose to prominence as a member of the protest group Ngā Tamatoa in 1970s Auckland, becoming a key figure of the Māori protest movement and the Māori renaissance. Since then, he has become an activist for the rights of Māori and the process of co-governance and decolonisation.

A native speaker of Te Reo Māori, Iti grew up at Ruatoki in Te Urewera, where he was barred from speaking Māori in school due to the government's anti-Māori language policy of the time. In the 1960s and 1970s Iti was involved in protests against the Vietnam War and apartheid in South Africa, and in many Māori protest actions as a member of Ngā Tamatoa. He is also known for his stalwart support of Tūhoe culture and tribal identity. Iti has stood unsuccessfully for the New Zealand Parliament on four occasions. Iti is known for his provocative style of protest and multidisciplinary art, which occasionally has courted controversy, and his distinctive dress. He often wears tailored shirts or coats, as well as top and bowler hats.

In recent years, Iti has become more widely known for his art, which often carries a political message supporting Māori or Tūhoe rights; in 2022 he received a Laureate Award from the Arts Foundation of New Zealand for his works. He also co-produced and starred in the film Muru, inspired by the events of the 2007 police raids and by the Crown's historic treatment of Tūhoe. In 2022 he presented an art exhibition I Will Not Speak Māori as part of the 50th anniversary celebrations of the 1972 Māori language petition. For his extensive activism in support of tino rangatiratanga, indigenous rights and the Māori language, Iti has been described by Wellington City Council as a national treasure.

== Early life, family and career ==
Iti was born in 1952. He descends from the iwi of Ngāi Tūhoe, but also has links with the Waikato iwi of Ngāti Wairere and Ngāti Hauā, and with Te Arawa. Told he was born on a train near Rotorua, Iti was raised by his great-granduncle and aunt, Hukarere and Te Peku Purewa, in the custom known as whāngai (adoption within the same family) on a farm at Ruatoki in the Urewera area. The couple had also raised his father, and Iti calls them his grandparents. He says that at the age of 10 his school headmaster (himself Māori) forbade pupils to speak the Māori language at school. On leaving school, he took up an apprenticeship in painting and decorating after completing a year-long Māori trade training scheme in Christchurch. During his time in Christchurch he was a local wrestling champion and had the opportunity to represent New Zealand at the 1974 Commonwealth Games, but did not take it due to his growing interest in activism.

In the mid-1980s Iti worked in addiction services supporting young Māori in Ruatoki. He worked as a radio DJ in the 1990s. He was a partner in a restaurant on Auckland's Karangahape Road that served traditional Māori food. The alcohol-free restaurant, which incorporated an art gallery, opened in 1999 but closed within a year. Iti was employed by Tūhoe Hauora, a health service, for several years in the 2000s as a social worker dealing with drug and alcohol problems. He has three children; two sons with his first wife, Ann Fletcher, who he was married to for six years in the 1970s, and a son through whāngai adoption. He has been with his long-term partner, Maria Steens, since 1997.

== Activism and political work ==
As the Māori nationalist movement grew in New Zealand in the late 1960s and 1970s, Iti became involved. He protested against the Vietnam War and apartheid in South Africa, and was involved with Ngā Tamatoa, a Māori protest group of the 1970s, from its early days. He first featured in news reports in 1972, when he put up his father's tent on the New Zealand Parliament grounds and called it the "Māori Embassy", as part of a Ngā Tamatoa protest about Māori land alienation. He joined the Communist Party of New Zealand, and went to China in 1973 during the Cultural Revolution. He has taken part in a number of land occupations and was part of the Māori land march to the New Zealand Parliament in 1975.

Iti's activism has often intertwined with his artistic career; Iti sees his activism as a form of art. In the mid-1990s, Iti set up a collaborative gallery called the Tūhoe Embassy, where artwork was sold to fundraise for Tūhoe self-determination. His ability to court controversy has made him a frequent feature in New Zealand news media. He has a full facial moko, and an article for Stuff describes him as having "one of the most recognisable faces in Aotearoa". He is also known for wearing top and bowler hats, and for performing whakapohane (baring his buttocks) at protests. In 2016, he said: "Over time, I had to get smart about how to exercise my political consciousness, and I discovered that art is probably the safest way I'm able to do that."

Iti stood unsuccessfully for Parliament as a candidate of Mana Māori in the 1996, 1999 and 2002 New Zealand general elections, and for the Māori Party in 2014. In 2015 Iti gave a talk for TEDx Auckland about his years of activism. In 2019 he was activist-in-residence for a week at Massey University, as part of which he held a public talk and a workshop, and released a paper on decolonialisation. In 2021 and 2022 he spoke out in support of the COVID-19 vaccine, and criticised participants of the early 2022 Wellington protest.

=== 2005 firearms charge ===
On 16 January 2005 during a pōwhiri (greeting ceremony) that formed part of a Waitangi Tribunal hearing, Iti fired a shotgun into a flag (reportedly an Australian flag, which he used as a substitute for the New Zealand flag) in close proximity to a large number of people. Iti explained this act as reference to the 1860s East Cape War: "We wanted them to feel the heat and smoke, and Tūhoe outrage and disgust at the way we have been treated for 200 years.". The incident was filmed by television crews but initially ignored by police. The matter was raised in Parliament, with an opposition member of Parliament asking "why Tāme Iti can brandish a firearm and gloat about how he got away with threatening judges on the Waitangi Tribunal, without immediate arrest and prosecution". The police subsequently charged Iti with unlawfully possessing and firing a shotgun in a public place.

The trial occurred in June 2006, and Iti elected to give evidence in Māori (his first language). He said that he was following the Tūhoe custom of making noise with tōtara poles. Tūhoe kaumātua said that the tribe had disciplined Iti and had clarified that guns were not to be fired in anger on the marae, but that they could be fired in honour of ancestors and those who fought in war (in a manner culturally equivalent to the firing of a gun salute on ceremonial occasions in Western culture). Judge Chris McGuire said: "It was designed to intimidate unnecessarily and shock. It was a stunt, it was unlawful." Iti was convicted on both charges and fined for the offences. Iti attempted to sell the flag he shot on the TradeMe auction site to pay the fine and his legal costs, but the sale was withdrawn by TradeMe following complaints. It was later put up for sale again by politics blog Tumeke.

Iti lodged an appeal in which his lawyer, Annette Sykes, argued that Crown law did not stretch to the ceremonial area in front of a marae's wharenui. On 4 April 2007, the Court of Appeal overturned his convictions for unlawfully possessing a firearm. While recognising that events occurred in "a unique setting", the court did not agree with Sykes' submission about Crown law. However Justices Hammond, O'Regan and Wilson found that his prosecutors failed to prove beyond reasonable doubt that Iti's actions caused "requisite harm" under section 51 of the Arms Act. The Court of Appeal described Iti's protest as "a foolhardy enterprise" and warned him not to attempt anything similar again.

=== 2007 police raids ===
Iti was one of 17 people arrested by police on 15 October 2007 in a series of raids under the Terrorism Suppression Act and the Firearms Act, carried out in Te Urewera and around New Zealand. He was in Whakatāne with his partner at the time of the raids. In September 2011 most of the alleged terrorists originally arrested with Iti had all terrorism and firearms charges dropped. Iti and three others were charged with belonging to a criminal group. The trial was held in February and March 2012, and Iti was found guilty on six firearms charges. On the most substantial charge of belonging to a criminal group, the jury could not reach a verdict, even when invited by the judge to reach a majority verdict of ten to one. The Crown decided not to proceed with a second trial. Justice Rodney Hansen sentenced Iti to a two-and-a-half-year prison term on 24 May 2012.

In October 2012 Iti and the three other defendants lost an appeal to the Court of Appeal against their sentences. Iti's son Wairere Iti said his father was "not overly surprised" by the outcome. Iti's application for leave to appeal to the Supreme Court was dismissed. He was granted parole in February 2013, having served nine months of his sentence, and released from prison on the morning of 27 February 2013. Prison staff described him as a "role model prisoner". Iti said he enjoyed his time inside, working as a mechanic and working on his art and writing.

== Art ==
=== Performance and installation ===
Iti performed a lead role in the Tempest dance theatre production by MAU, a New Zealand contemporary dance company, directed by Samoan choreographer Lemi Ponifasio. The Tempest premiered in Vienna in June 2007. Tempest II was performed at the Queen Elizabeth Hall, Southbank Centre, London in June 2008. Because of Iti's arrest as part of the 2007 raids, Ponifasio had to convince the New Zealand High Court to relax his bail conditions and allow him to travel on the 2008 tour. Affidavits in support of MAU from international arts organisations were submitted as evidence to the High Court. Iti was permitted to travel for the tour. Tempest: Without a Body made its New Zealand premiere at the Auckland Festival in March 2009.

Iti is also a painter, sculptor carver, and has said of his involvement in art: "As a late starter, I had no idea that art would be such an intricate part of where I am and it's been quite a journey." He uses mainly acrylic or oil paint, and his paintings often feature large groups of people or silhouettes. He has exhibited at galleries in Auckland, Christchurch and Ōtaki.

In September 2022, Iti received an Arts Foundation of New Zealand Laureate Award for excellence in multidisciplinary art (the Burr/Tatham Trust Award). The same month, he presented an art installation called I Will Not Speak Māori as part of Te Hui Ahurei Reo Māori, a festival commemorating 50 years since the 1972 Māori language petition was presented to Parliament by Ngā Tamatoa and other groups (which led to the establishment of Te Wiki o te Reo Māori). The title comes from Iti's childhood experiences of being forbidden to speak Māori at school. The installation involves various aspects including steel sculptures, a livestreamed pōhiri performance by Iti, projection of Iti writing "I will not speak Māori", with the "not" crossed out, on the walls of Te Papa, a painting installation with the same words on the Wellington waterfront, and a nationwide poster campaign. When the painting installation was first installed, a member of the public cut out the "not" from the phrase; Iti said in response, "I want to meet that person, I want to shake their hand, because that's all part of the art ... that's what art is about, and I love that." The Wellington City Council describes him as "a national treasure and an icon of Māoridom... his work spans half a century, and has seen him become a household name."

On 20 September 2022, Iti corrected his own name using orange paint on a 2008 painting by Dean Proudfoot displayed at the QT Hotel in Wellington. Proudfoot had misspelled Iti's name as Tama. Chris Parkin, owner of the artwork, described Iti's actions as "vandalism". Proudfoot apologised for the error and said Iti's correction had "given the work a new life with a far more powerful meaning".

=== Film and television ===
In 2008, Iti featured with his son Toikairakau (Toi) Iti in the New Zealand documentary Children of the Revolution (2008) which screened on Māori Television in April of the same year. Children of the Revolution is about the children of political activists in New Zealand and also featured anti-apartheid leader John Minto and his teenage son; Green Party member of Parliament Sue Bradford and her journalist daughter Katie Azania Bradford; Māori Party member of Parliament Hone Harawira and his wife Hilda Harawira with their daughter Te Whenua Harawira (organiser of the 2004 Seabed and Foreshore Land March) and musician and former political prisoner Tigilau Ness with his son, hip hop artist Che Fu. The documentary was directed by Makerita Urale and produced by Claudette Hauiti and Māori production company Front of the Box Productions. The documentary won Best Māori language Programme at the New Zealand Qantas Television Awards (now called Qantas Film & Television Awards) in 2008.

Iti worked together with the Ngāi Tūhoe community and director Tearepa Kahi to create the feature film Muru (2022), an action-drama film inspired by the Tūhoe raids. Iti co-produced the film and starred as himself. Iti has said the movie features events from the raids as well as by the Crown's overall history with Tūhoe; it is an artistic response to what Iti describes as "200 years of police oppression towards the Māori people", rather than a direct adaptation of the raids.

In September 2023 Iti was announced as one of the 18 cast members of Celebrity Treasure Island 2023. He withdrew during episode 5 of the show due to health difficulties.
