= Muru (film) =

2022 New Zealand historical action film

- Directed by: Tearepa Kahi
- Written by: Tearepa Kahi; Jason Nathan
- Produced by: Tame Iti; Selina Joe; Reikura Kahi
- Starring: Cliff Curtis; Jay Ryan; Manu Bennett
- Cinematography: Chris Mauger; Fred Renata
- Edited by: John Gilbert
- Music by: Mahuia Bridgman-Cooper
- Production companies: Jawbone Pictures; October 15; Wheke Group
- Distributed by: Rialto Distribution; Arclight Films
- Release dates: 28 July 2022 (New Zealand International Film Festival); 1 September 2022 (New Zealand)
- Running time: 104 minutes
- Country: New Zealand
- Languages: Te Reo Māori, English

Muru is a 2022 New Zealand action-drama film very loosely based on the 2007 New Zealand police raids against the Ngāi Tūhoe community of Rūātoki. Written and directed by Tearepa Kahi, the film stars Cliff Curtis, Jay Ryan and Manu Bennett. The film was released as the opening night film of the New Zealand International Film Festival on 28 July 2022.

== Plot ==
Community Sergeant 'Taffy' Tawharau has recently returned home to the community of Rūātoki to live with his elderly father. In addition to his policing duties alongside fellow police officer Blake, Taffy drives the local school bus. The Ngāi Tūhoe activist Tame Iti, who is a well known local community figure, runs a series of boot camps called Camp Rama (fire light) in the forests of Te Urewera valley. While these boot camps focus on survival skills and preserving Tūhoe identity, they attract the attention of the New Zealand Police's elite Special Tactics Group (STG) who believe that they are terrorists plotting to kill the Prime Minister.

After a troubled youth named Rusty fires a loaded rifle during an argument at a Rama campsite meeting, the STG step up their surveillance activities around Rūātoki, which unnerves Taffy and Blake. Taffy later finds Rusty vandalising a local bakery. Instead of arresting him, Taff takes Rusty to a Rama meeting. During the meeting, Taffy finds an STG operative spying on the camp and tracks him down to a van. The STG Team Leader Gallagher tells Taffy of their surveillance operations against Tame and attempt to enlist Taffy as an informant. Respecting Tame, Taffy refuses and later discovers that another local police officer Potaka is a police informant.

Taffy also convinces Rusty to make amends for his vandalism. Before Rusty can return to the bakery to clean it up, Police launch a nationwide raid against suspected terrorists including Tame Iti. STG reinforcements converge on Rūātoki, arresting several local residents in early morning raids. Taffy is ordered by an STG officer to drive a school bus with children to a stop-over. STG officers mistake Rusty's broom for a weapon and chase him to his home. One of the STG officers is accidentally killed when his gun accidentally discharges during a pursuit.

Believing that Rusty murdered the officer, Team Leader Gallagher launches a manhunt. Potaka pursues Rusty to the Whakatāne River and manages to convince the youth to lay down his arm. However, a vengeful Kimiora attempts to shoot Rusty but hits Potaka instead. Taffy is also detained on grounds of aiding Tame Iti. Despite sustaining a bullet in his shoulder, Rusty escapes with the help of Blake, who brings the boy to his parents. Believing that Tame Iti and his followers are terrorists, Gallagher uses the Terrorism Suppression Act 2002 to impose a lockdown on Rūātoki, restricting local travel and movement. To prevent further bloodshed, Tame Iti surrenders himself to the authorities.

Taffy later escapes police custody and takes Maria hostage. In retaliation, Gallagher detains Taffy's father and threatens him in order to force him to reveal Rusty's whereabouts. As the manhunt continues, Gallagher clashes with fellow STG officer Kimiora, who grows wary of his superior officer's aggressive tactics. Using a helicopter, Gallagher's team later recaptures Taffy. Gallagher's helicopter tracks down Rusty's parents' ute. STG officer Kimiora shoots Rusty's father during the shootout but Rusty, his mother, and Blake escape the vehicle. While Dr Foon treats Rusty's injuries, Blake and Gallagher fight and subdue Kimiora, forcing him to stand down.

As the police lift their lockdown, Blake attends to the children detained on the school bus, reassuring them that the crisis is over.

== Cast and characters ==
- Cliff Curtis as Sergeant 'Taffy' Tawharau
- Jay Ryan as Gallagher
- Manu Bennett as Kimiora
- Simone Kessell as Maria
- Tame Iti as self
- Roimata Fox as Harata
- Ria Paki as Blake
- Poroaki Merritt-McDonald as Rusty / Waikura
- Xavier Horan as Sergeant 'Ren' Renata
- Oriini Kaipara as Hine
- Byron Coll as Jarrod
- Andrew Cottle as Sergeant Philip
- Cinzia Maioha Jonathan as Dr. Foon
- Troy Kingi as Mooks
- Colin Moy as Wilson
- Rangi Rangitukunoa as Potaka
- Nepia Takuira-Mita as Pana

== Production ==
Muru is the first film to receive funding through Te Tumu Whakaata Taonga, a New Zealand Film Commission fund intended to develop feature films in te reo Māori. The film was shot in on location in the Waimana Valley and Rūātoki, where the raids took place in 2007. The film was co-produced by and stars Tame Iti, who was arrested and charged with domestic terrorism during the raids, and was developed using kaupapa Māori perspective; working together with the Tūhoe to shape and create the film. Lead actor Cliff Curtis learnt how to speak with a Tūhoe accent in Māori for the film.

"Matemateāone", a 2021 song by Stan Walker performed in Te Reo Māori, was used during the film's credits.

== Release ==
The film was initially intended to be released on 3 February 2022 to coincide with Waitangi Day, however the release was delayed. The film opened the New Zealand International Film Festival in Auckland on July 28, before receiving a nation-wide release on 1 September 2022.

The film also played at the 2022 Toronto International Film Festival, where it had its international premiere, and also made it to 'Flash Forward' section of 27th Busan International Film Festival, screened in October 2022. It is the closing film in the Australian film festival of indigenous cinema in Melbourne, Birrarangga Film Festival, on 28 April 2023.

== Reception ==
The film received positive reviews. It holds a 92% on Rotten Tomatoes based on 12 critic reviews. Muru is the top-performing film of New Zealand origin at the New Zealand Box Office for the year, as of October 2022.

Graeme Tuckett of Stuff awarded the film four stars. He described it as a "provocative, occasionally aggravating and mostly absolutely bloody brilliant piece of writing" that blended several different genres including political thrillers, action movies, and drama. He described the film as a "response to a century of conflict, harassment and misunderstanding between Tūhoe and various governments" including the 2007 anti-terror raids and the arrest of Māori leader and prophet Rua Kēnana in 1916.

Simon Morris of Radio New Zealand commended the film's visual, sound quality, acting, and passion. He also praised writer/director Tearepa Kahi, and cast members Cliff Curtis and Simone Kessel for "turning over 100 years of events into just under two hours of cracking story, and one that will stand up to repeated viewings."

Luke Buckmaster of The Guardian awarded the film three out of five stars, stating that it "spoke truth to power - but it's sometimes too brash for its own good." He praised the film's story development, cinematography, the casting of a historical figure Tame Iti as a cast member, and Cliff Curtis' performance. However, Buckmaster criticised the simplistic and cartoonish depiction of the antagonistic elite police characters and opined that a climatic action scene clashed with the film's realism.

Trista Coulter of Scenestr credited the film's scriptwriting with bringing together its characters' narratives to create a multifaceted story that allowed the audience to experience the events of Muru from multiple perspectives. She also praised the performances of cast members Curtis, Jay Ryan, Manu Bennett, Simone Kessell, Ria Paki, and Tame Iti. Coulter also praised the film for its use of the Māori language, New Zealand's natural landscape and culture, and the relationship between indigenous communities and "colonial" government bodies in New Zealand.

== Historical accuracy ==
The film's writer/director Tearepa Kahi drew inspiration for Muru from several events in New Zealand history including the 2007 anti-terror raids on Tuhoe, the Police shooting of Steven Wallace in Waitara in 2000, and the arrest of Māori leader and prophet Rua Kēnana in 1916. At the exposition, Muru contains a statement stating that "this film is not a recreation… it is a response" to the events of the Tuhoe raids. Contrary to the film's depiction of the Tuhoe raid, no firearms were fired, and no one was injured, killed, or thrown from helicopters during the actual raid. Māori activist Tame Iti, who was arrested during the 2007 raids and tried on firearms charges, stars as himself in the film.

== See also ==
- List of submissions to the 95th Academy Awards for Best International Feature Film
- List of New Zealand submissions for the Academy Award for Best International Feature Film
