= Simone Kessell =

New Zealand actress (born 1975)

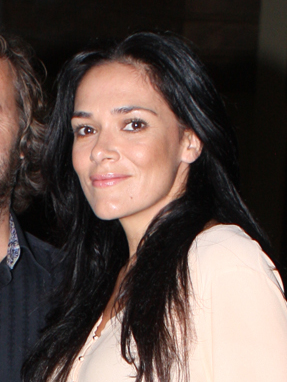
- Kessell in 2012
- Born: August 19, 1975 (age 50); Auckland, New Zealand
- Occupation: Actress
- Years active: 1992–present
- Spouse: Gregor Jordan (m. 2004)
- Children: 2

Simone Kessell (born 19 August 1975) is a New Zealand television actress known for her role as Lt. Alicia Washington in the short-lived Fox science fiction television series Terra Nova. In 2016, Kessell starred opposite Ray Winstone on the short-lived ABC prime-time television fantasy soap opera Of Kings and Prophets. As of 2023 she co-stars on the Showtime series Yellowjackets.

== Career ==
Her early work included appearances in New Zealand and Australian productions like Hercules: The Legendary Journeys, Xena: Warrior Princess, Water Rats, and Medivac, where she played Dr. Stella O'Shaughnessy. She also appeared in TV films such as McLeod's Daughters and Return to Treasure Island.

Then, she expanded her career with roles in American series such as CSI: Miami, Criminal Minds, and Fringe. In 2011, she portrayed Lieutenant Alicia Washington in the sci-fi series Terra Nova.

More recently, Kessell played Breha Organa in the Obi-Wan Kenobi miniseries, and Mother Teach in Our Flag Means Death. Since 2023, she has been part of the main cast in Yellowjackets, portraying the adult version of Lottie Matthews.

== Personal life ==
Kessell was born in Auckland to a Māori mother, of Ngāti Tūwharetoa and Ngāi Te Rangi descent, and a Pākehā father of European descent. She is married to Australian director Gregor Jordan. They have two sons, Jack and Beau.

Simone Kessell is also a pickleball player. In 2024, she secured a gold medal in the women's singles (35+ age 4.0) and a silver in women's doubles at the Australian Pickleball Championships. She serves as an ambassador for JOOLA Australia and captains the Brisbane Breakers in Major League Pickleball Australia.

== Filmography ==
=== Film ===
Year	Title	Role	Notes
2001	Stickmen	Karen	
2001	Lotto		Short
2003	Liquid Bridge	Jeanne	
2005	Sum of Existence	Dr. Juliet King	
2008	The Informers	Nina Metro	
2008	Frost/Nixon	Airport Check-In Woman	
2009	Blue Boy	Mrs. Jordan	Short
2011	Burning Man	Oscar's Teacher	
2013	The Lovers	Clara Coldstream	
2015	San Andreas	Kim Swann	
2017	2:22	Serena	
2017	1%	Hayley	
2022	Muru	Maria	
2024	Hard Home	Mary Flint	
TBA	Honeymoon with Harry	TBA	Filming
TBA	Subversion	TBA	Post-production

=== Television ===
Year	Title	Role	Notes	Ref
1992	Homeward Bound	Hannah Tumai		
1994	Hercules and the Amazon Women	Jana	TV film	
1994	Hercules and the Circle of Fire	Girl / Hag	TV film	
1994	Hercules in the Underworld	Girl / Hag	TV film	
1994	High Tide	Young Tennis Star	Episode: "Party Time", "Match Point"	
1994	The Cartoon Company	Presenter		
1995–96	Hercules: The Legendary Journeys	Rena	Episode: "What's in a Name?", "The Wedding of Alcmene"	
1996	G.P.	Joanne Mills	Episode: "Someone to Turn To"	
1996	McLeod's Daughters	Jodi Wilcox	TV film	
1996	Return to Treasure Island	Coral	TV film	
1997	Xena: Warrior Princess	Miss Messini	Episode: "Here She Comes... Miss Amphipolis"	
1997	Heartbreak High	Aurora	Episode: "5.23", "5.24"	
1997	Nga Wahine	Moana Williams		
1998	The Violent Earth	Gabrielle	TV miniseries	
1998	Medivac	Dr. Stella O'Shaughness	Lead role	
1999	Water Rats	Eleni Spartels	Episode: "Cut-off Point"	
1999	Wildside	Roxanne Tate	Episode: "2.16"	
1999	Greenstone	Marama		
1999	Stingers	Despina Polo	Episode: "Counting the Beat"	
1999	Hercules: The Legendary Journeys	Havisha	Episode: "We'll Always Have Cyprus"	
1999	Hercules: The Legendary Journeys	Kayla	Episode: "Love, Amazon Style"	
1999	BeastMaster	Hyppolyte	Episode: "Amazons"	
1999	Airtight	Portia	TV film	
2000	Farscape	Finzzi	Episode: "Dream a Little Dream"	
2001	The Lost World	Danielle	Episode: "Voodoo Queen"	
2001	Hard Knox	Delicious Malicious	TV film	
2001	All Saints	Naomi Fisher	Episode: "The Sign", "Behind Closed Doors"	
2002	Mataku	Virginia	Episode: "The God Child"	
2003	White Collar Blue	Kaz	Episode: "2.4", "2.5"	
2005	CSI: Miami	Agent Maxwell	Episode: "From the Grave"	
2007	Criminal Minds	Sarah Danlin	Episode: "Jones"	
2009	Underbelly: A Tale of Two Cities	Isabelle Wilson	Recurring role	
2009	Reaper	Sally	Episode: "No Reaper Left Behind"	
2009	Fringe	Nurse / Shapeshifting Soldier	Episode: "A New Day in the Old Town"	
2011	Panic at Rock Island	Louise Olsson	TV film	
2011	Terra Nova	Lt. Alicia Washington	Recurring role (12 episodes)	
2014	Fat Tony & Co.	Tamara Chippindall	Recurring role	
2014–15	Wonderland	Sasha Clarke	Supporting role (series 2–3)	
2016	Of Kings and Prophets	Queen Ahinoam	Lead role (9 episodes)	
2017	A Bunch of Dicks	Michelle Deportes	Web short	
2018	The Crossing	Rebecca	Lead role	
2018	Pine Gap	Belle James	6 episodes	
2019–2020	Reckoning	Paige Serrato	10 episodes	
2022	Obi-Wan Kenobi	Breha Organa	Miniseries, 2 episodes	
2022	Our Flag Means Death	Mother Teach	Recurring role (2 episodes)	
2022	My Life Is Murder	Faith Cooper	Episode: Rising Angel	
2023	The Night Agent	Emma Campbell	Episode: The Call	
2023–2025	Yellowjackets	Adult Charlotte "Lottie" Matthews	Main role (season 2–3, 14 episodes)	
2023	Wellmania	Helen King	3 episodes	
2024	Hard Home	Mary	Lead, TV film	
2024	Critical Incident	Detective Edith Barcelos	6 episodes	
2025	The Last Frontier	Sarah Remnick	Main role	
2026	Ms. X	Saskia	6 episodes	
2026	Flower & Flour	Aunt Nina		
