= Hard Home =

- Directed by: James Bamford
- Written by: Mark Shea Price
- Starring: Simone Kessell; Andrew Howard; Rosie Day
- Release date: 25 June 2024
- Countries: United States; Bulgaria
- Language: English

Hard home is a 2024 American revenge-thriller film directed by James Bamford.

== Plot ==
After the shocking murder of her daughter, a woman turns her high-tech home into a trap for the killer, initiating a deadly cat-and-mouse game where every move can be fatal.

== Cast ==
- Simone Kessell as Mary Flint
- Andrew Howard as Diablo Killer
- Rosie Day as Kelly Flint
- Devora Wilde as reporter
- Joseph Millson as Robert Flint
- Rachel Adedeji as agent Selena Wall
- Daphne Cheung as Jiao
- Teresa Cendon-Garcia as Anna
