= Rosie Day =

English actress

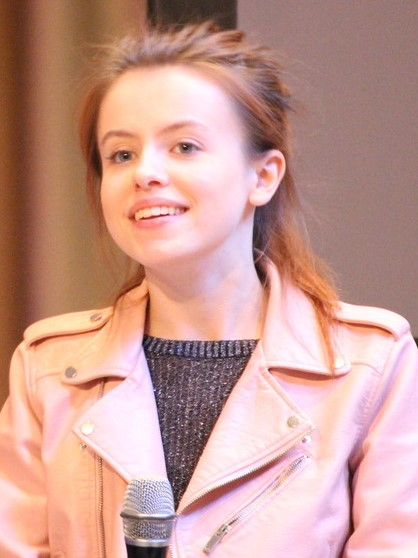
- Day in 2017
- Born: Rosie Jane Day; 1995 or 1996 (age 30–31); Cambridge, Cambridgeshire, England
- Occupations: Actress, writer, director
- Years active: 1999–present

Rosie Jane Day (born 1995 or 1996) is an English actress, author and playwright. She is known for her portrayals of Mary Hawkins in the Starz historical drama series Outlander (2016), Tina Pemberton in Sky One's comedy-drama series Living the Dream (2017–2019), Summer Falk in the romantic comedy film All Roads Lead to Rome (2016), and Sierra in the supernatural horror film Down a Dark Hall (2018).

She is the best selling author of The Tutor on Audible.

Day is an ambassador for stem4, a teenage mental health charity. Her debut book, Instructions for a Teenage Armageddon—based on her one-woman show of the same name—was published in 2021.

== Career ==
At the age of four, Day was spotted by a casting director and given her first role, playing Emma on the first season of the BBC drama series Hope and Glory, which aired in 1999. She featured as one of the Dudakov children in Maxim Gorky's Summerfolk at the Royal National Theatre the following year, and went on to build a strong reputation as a child actor in such series as Black Books, Family Affairs, Bernard's Watch, My Life as a Popat, and Harley Street. Though she did not train professionally, Day drew from her experiences working alongside adult co-stars, studying and imitating them.

In 2010, at age 16, Day played Naomi in the Anya Reiss play Spur of the Moment on the West End. She made her feature film debut in 2012, starring as sex-trafficking victim Angel in the horror film The Seasoning House. The role brought her critical acclaim, as well as a Best Actress win at the Screamfest Horror Film Festival. To prepare for the part, Day conducted extensive research into "the experience of women who [had] been in that situation", while also learning sign language. She later said that playing Angel had "certainly had an effect" on her. In 2013, Day was chosen as one of Screen International's "Stars of Tomorrow".

In 2015, Day co-starred as Sarah Jessica Parker's defiant teenage daughter in the romantic comedy All Roads Lead To Rome, citing Parker as "a huge influence" professionally. From there, she returned to the small screen for the recurring role of Mary Hawkins on the second season of the Starz historical drama, Outlander. Airing in 2016, Day was suggested for the part of Hawkins by Scottish actor Sam Heughan, with whom she had worked two years previously.

Day's performance in the 2017 drama Butterfly Kisses was well received, with the film going on to win a Crystal Bear at the 67th Berlin International Film Festival. Day appeared as Pam Tennison in the ITV miniseries Prime Suspect 1973 that same year, and began starring as Tina Pemberton in the Sky One comedy-drama series Living the Dream; a role she played until 2019.

In 2018, Day starred as Sierra, a troubled boarding school pupil, in the supernatural horror film Down a Dark Hall. Describing herself as a feminist, Day said that she was attracted to the project because of its female-centred approach. She then portrayed actress Jane Asher in a 2019 episode of Sky Arts' Urban Myths, and starred as the drug-addicted mother of a newborn in the 2020 psychological thriller film Baby, with Screen Daily describing her performance in the latter as "expressive" and "persuasive".

Day starred in the improvisational comedy film Real Love in 2021, as well as voicing the character of Meteion in the video game Final Fantasy XIV: Endwalker. Following guest roles on McDonald & Dodds and Call the Midwife that same year, Day appeared in the self-penned one-woman show, Instructions for a Teenage Armageddon, which—after previewing in 2020—ran from February to March 2022 at the Southwark Playhouse. Writing for WhatsOnStage.com, Alun Hood described her portrayal of Eileen in Armageddon as "impressive and unsettling", adding that it was imbued with "sparky, nihilistic wit". Next, Day co-starred as murder victim Kelly Flint in the vigilante thriller film Hard Home, which debuted on streaming platforms in 2024.

== Other work ==
It was announced in March 2025 that Day's debut novel, Vipers, had been acquired by Serpent's Tail for release in 2027. It follows the publication of her non-fiction book, Instructions for a Teenage Armageddon, in 2021. and I Think I Like Girls in 2025. Her Audible Original, The Tutor starring Mia Mckenna-Bruce and Alex Hassell went to Number One in 2026.

== Filmography ==
=== Feature film ===
Year	Title	Role	Notes
2012	The Seasoning House	Angel	Winner: Best Actress, Screamfest
2013	Sixteen	Chloe	
2013	Ironclad: Battle for Blood	Kate De Vesci	
2014	Heart of Lightness	Hilde	
2015	Howl	Nina	
2015	All Roads Lead to Rome	Summer	
2017	Butterfly Kisses	Zara	
2018	Down a Dark Hall	Sierra	
2018	The Convent	Sister Emeline	
2018	Peripheral	Shelly	
2020	Indigo Valley	Louise	
2020	Baby	Neska	
2024	Hard Home	Kelly Flint	
TBA	Brighton Storeys †	Unknown	

Key
†	Denotes films that have not yet been released

=== Television ===
Year	Title	Role	Notes
1999	Hope and Glory	Emma	Main cast (series 1)
2000	Black Books	Lucy	3 episodes
2002	In Deep	Charlotte	2 episodes
2002	Big Train	Jenny	Episode #2.3
2002	Family Affairs	Harriet Matherson	7 episodes
2002	Darwin's Daughter	Etty Darwin	Television film
2003	Trust	Emma Naylor	Miniseries; main cast
2004–2005	Bernard's Watch	Nicolette Ashbury	Main cast
2006	The Large Family	Laura Large (voice)	Main cast
2006	The Romantics	Dorothy Wordsworth	Episode: "Liberty"
2007	Fallen Angel	Lucy (voice)	Episode: "The Four Last Things"
2007	My Life as a Popat	Tatiana	Main cast (series 2)
2008	Harley Street	Tess Elliot	4 episodes
2009	Half Moon Investigations	Shell Travers	Episode: "The Case of the Purple Pool"
2009; 2011	Doctors	Meg White; Alice Goodson	2 episodes
2010	Summer in Transylvania	Mirana	Episode: "Attack of the Psycho Dates"
2012	Holby City	Kay Barker	Episode: "Butterflies"
2012	DCI Banks	Hannah Rothwell	2 episodes
2012	Homefront	Millie Bartham	Miniseries; main cast
2013	Misfits	Lucy	Episode #5.1
2014	Siblings	Ellie	Episode: "Intern School"
2015	Cuffs	Stacey Shawcross	3 episodes
2016	Grantchester	Joan	Episode #2.3
2016	Outlander	Mary Hawkins	Recurring (series 2)
2017	Prime Suspect 1973	Pam Tennison	Miniseries; main cast
2017	Watership Down	Thethuthinnang (voice)	Miniseries; main cast
2017–2019	Living the Dream	Tina	Main cast
2018	Baby Shower	Rosie	Web series; episode: "Legend on Board"
2019	Frank	Bonnie	Unaired pilot
2019	Good Omens	Lisa	Episode: "The Doomsday Option"
2019	Urban Myths	Jane Asher	Episode: "Paul McCartney's Scrambled Eggs"
2020	Agatha Raisin	Karen	Episode: "Love from Hell"
2022	McDonald & Dodds	Rose Boleyn	Episode #3.3
2021	Call the Midwife	Anita Page	Episode: "Christmas Special"
2022	The Sandman	Tabby Kitten (voice)	Episode: "Dream of a Thousand Cats"

=== Video games ===
Year	Title	Role	Notes
2021	Bravely Default II	Anihal	
2021	Final Fantasy XIV: Endwalker	Meteion / The Endsinger	
2022	Triangle Strategy	Cordelia Glenbrook; Decimal; Quahaug	
2022	Arknights	Platinum	
2023	Ten Dates	Misha	
2023	Xenoblade Chronicles 3: Future Redeemed	A	
2025	Honkai: Star Rail	Hysilens	
2025	Eriksholm: The Stolen Dream	Hanna	
2025	Genshin Impact	Keqing	Version 5.7 and onwards; replaced Kayli Mills
2026	Dragon Quest VII Reimagined	Additional voices	

=== Radio ===
Year	Title	Role	Notes
2008	Mother Spy	Janie Chisholm	BBC Radio 4
2017	The Rosenthals	Pippa Lloyd	BBC Radio 4

=== Scripted podcast ===
Year	Title	Role	Notes
2020	Doctor Who: The New Adventures of Bernice Summerfield	Arn (voice)	Episode: "The Undying Truth"
2021	The Worlds of Blake's 7	Alixa / Senna (voice)	Episode: "Heart of Ice"
2025	Doctor Who: The Fourth Doctor Adventures	Betty (voice)	Episode: "The Hellwood Inheritance"

=== As director ===
Year	Title	Role	Notes
2014	Girl to Girl	—N/a	Short film; also writer
2019	Tracks	—N/a	Short film; also writer
2020	Celaine	—N/a	Short film; also writer

== Theatre ==
Year	Title	Role	Notes
2000	Summerfolk	Anya	Royal National Theatre
2001	The Playboy of the Western World	Lily	Royal National Theatre
2002	The Winter's Tale	Bohemia	Royal National Theatre
2006	Les Misérables	Young Cosette	Sondheim Theatre
2010	Spur of the Moment	Naomi	Royal Court Theatre
2011	Microwave	Becky	National Theatre Studio
2012	Pussy Riot	Kate	Royal Court Theatre
2014	Velocity	Dot	Finborough Theatre
2018	Again	Izzy	Trafalgar Studios
2019	The Girl Who Fell	Billie	Trafalgar Studios
2022	Instructions for a Teenage Armageddon	Eileen	Southwark Playhouse; also writer
2022	The Fellowship	Simone	Hampstead Theatre
2024	When It Happens to You	Esme	Park Theatre
2025	(This is Not A) Happy Room	Elle	King's Head Theatre; also writer
