= Ms. X =

- Genre: Crime drama
- Directed by: David de Lautour
- Starring: Melissa George; Simone Kessell; Dean O'Gorman; Robbie Magasiva; Jonno Roberts; Oscar Kightley
- Country of origin: New Zealand
- Original language: English

Original release
- Network: Three

Ms. X is a television drama series for New Zealand's Three, produced by Plus6Four and South Pacific Pictures. The series focuses on a woman named Mia who teams up with an old friend from high school to scare Mia's cheating husband into being faithful, but it leads to something far more dangerous.

== Plot ==
Mia Bennett (Melissa George) is a suburban stay-at-home mother in Auckland, New Zealand. Her husband Jerry runs a printing business, JB Print, and has told Mia he is working long hours to secure new contracts. Mia discovers that Jerry has been hiding his wedding ring inside a water bottle and suspects he is having an affair. Jerry tells Mia he is leaving town for a work conference, but after Mia coincidentally reconnects with Oscar Clarke (Dean O'Gorman), a self-titled private investigator she knew in high school, Oscar tracks Jerry's location to the Hotel Royal in the city. Oscar confronts Jerry in his room, and Jerry strikes him with a table ornament. Shortly after Mia and Oscar leave the hotel, Jerry falls from his hotel room window.

Detective Woody Morrison (Oscar Kightley) informs Mia that police believe Jerry committed suicide, but Mia and Oscar find a bag of cash and a burner phone in a storage unit Jerry had rented. A man named DMac (Jonno Roberts), a gang leader and drug distributor, begins threatening Mia using the burner phone, demanding a forged passport that Jerry had been commissioned to produce. Mia also learns that Jerry left her with nearly $400,000 in debt, a lapsed life insurance policy, and a remortgaged house.

Under threat from DMac, Mia and Oscar attend a dinner party at the home of Bridget, a fellow parent at her children's school, and steal the passport of Bridget's husband, Jose. Monica, Jerry's former receptionist, is revealed to be the forger who produced the documents. Mia delivers the passport to DMac, who uses it to smuggle a cartel operative known as the Gatekeeper into New Zealand. The Gatekeeper is killed shortly after arrival by Saskia (Simone Kessell), DMac's estranged wife, who has been working to undermine him. Morrison begins to investigate Jerry's death as a potential homicide. He identifies Oscar from hotel surveillance footage and later connects him to the stolen passport through testimony from Jose. Morrison also links the Gatekeeper's body to a cartel operation and begins building a case against DMac.

Mia's daughter Olivia develops an inappropriate relationship with her English teacher, Wayne Ambrose. He makes advances toward Olivia and later threatens her when she resists. Mia confronts Wayne and, with DMac's assistance, coerces him into supporting Olivia's candidacy for head girl. Mia's son Max, meanwhile, runs a sneaker operation with his friend Dylan to help cover the family's debts.

When the cartel demands that DMac account for the dead Gatekeeper and complete the drug shipment, Mia brokers an alliance between DMac and his rival, Tavita (Robbie Magasiva), leader of the 47s gang. Oscar poses as the truck driver and retrieves a shipment of liquid cocaine from the Port of Auckland. Tavita's crew processes the drugs at houses Mia has secured through Ricky, Dylan's father and a local real estate agent with whom she has begun a relationship. Max and Dylan have been storing counterfeit sneakers at one of the same properties. When their armed supplier Jin arrives to collect payment, he unexpectedly discovers the drug operation and a shooting breaks out. Tavita uses the chaos to seize the processed drugs and double-cross DMac.

Police arrest Oscar over his links to Jerry's fall and passport theft, but he manages to escape custody with the help of his legal aid.

Jerry's phone, recovered by Mia, contains a video he recorded before his death. The footage shows Saskia drugging Jerry and pushing him from the hotel window. Mia uploads the video to cloud storage and sends it to Morrison. DMac and his men track Tavita to an airport hangar where the stolen drugs are stored. A firefight breaks out. Saskia arrives, shoots DMac, and attempts to take control of the operation. Mia, who has retrieved the van containing the drugs during the chaos, has George, Oscar's cousin, modify the vehicle and instructs Oscar to deliver it to the cartel's representative.

Saskia tracks Mia to her home and holds her at gunpoint, demanding the drugs. Mia tells Saskia that Jerry filmed his own murder and that the footage has been uploaded. The two fight. Mia triggers a security alarm and incapacitates Saskia with a piece of broken picture frame, causing Saskia to fall onto a cleaver embedded in the wall.

Oscar delivers the drugs and is released. Morrison receives Jerry's video, confirming Saskia killed him. DMac is arrested. Morrison informs Mia that Jerry's case is being closed and that police recovered a body of a person of interest in Tauranga, implied to be Saskia - the media have dubbed her "Ms X." Mia uses remaining cartel funds to pay off Jerry's tax debt. Oscar tells her that Monica has begun rebranding JB Print, and Mia warns him not to go overboard. The first season ends with Mia receiving a call on her burner phone.

== Cast ==
On 30 May 2025, Melissa George was named in the lead role of Mia for the series. On 8 July 2025, it was announced that Robbie Magasiva, Jonno Roberts and Oscar Kightley had joined the cast.

- Melissa George as Mia Bennet
- Simone Kessell as Saskia
- Dean O'Gorman as Oscar Clarke
- Jonno Roberts as DMac
- Oscar Kightley as Woody Morrison
- Robbie Magasiva as Tavita
- Antonia Eaton as Oliva Bennet
- Tom Kerr as Max Bennet

== Series 1 (2026) ==
| No. overall | No. in series | Title | Directed by | Written by | Original release date | N.Z. viewers (thousand) |
|---|---|---|---|---|---|---|
| 1 | 1 | "Til Death Do Us Part" | David de Lautour | David de Lautour & Hannah Marshall | 30 June 2026 | N/A |
Suburban mom Mia and her high school friend plot a scheme to frighten her unfaithful husband into staying faithful.
| 2 | 2 | "New Phone, Who Dis?" | David de Lautour | David de Lautour & Hannah Marshall | 30 June 2026 | N/A |
Reeling from Jerry's death, Mia must plan a funeral while a ruthless gangster hunts her down, demanding Jerry deliver what he owed him.
| 3 | 3 | "The Talented Mr. Roberts" | David de Lautour | David de Lautour & Hannah Marshall | 7 July 2026 | N/A |
Mia goes to a PTA dinner party. Together with Oscar they steal a passport from the hosts safe due to the demands of the cartel.
| 4 | 4 | "Blonde Woman Vision Board" | David de Lautour | David de Lautour & Hannah Marshall | 14 July 2026 | N/A |
Mia faces growing danger as cartel tensions rise, while Oscar investigates the mystery of the blonde woman linked to Jerry's secrets. With threats closing in, Mia must make difficult choices to survive.
| 5 | 5 | "Winner, Winner, Chicken Dinner" | David de Lautour | David de Lautour & Hannah Marshall | 21 July 2026 | N/A |
Mia attempts to unite rival criminals to recover a cartel shipment, but her risky plan quickly spirals out of control. As tensions rise and secrets emerge, her personal life and criminal dealings begin to collide.
| 6 | 6 | "Till Death Do Us Part Two" | David de Lautour | David de Lautour & Hannah Marshall | 28 July 2026 | N/A |
Mia's desperate attempts to escape her criminal problems reach a breaking point as alliances shift and old enemies return. With danger surrounding her from all sides, she must fight to protect herself and those closest to her.

== Production ==
On 12 April 2024, it was announced with six other shows that Ms. X had received funding from NZ On Air alongside other projects including Educators and Island of Mystery.

On 30 May 2025, it was announced that series had entered production with David de Lautour directing and executive producing the series alongside Hannah Marshall. On June 2 2025, Warner Bros Discovery announced it had officially commissioned the show, with production taking place on location in New Zealand.

On 13 May 2026, Disney+ announced that it had secured the series for the UK and Ireland with it to air in July 2026. Foxtel Australia announced that series would air on 30 June on Binge.

On 11 August 2026, it was announced the show had been renewed for a second season. NZ On Air will be investing $3,750,000 with producers Plus6Four Entertainment.

== External link ==
- Ms. X on IMDb
