= Living the Dream (British TV series) =

- Genre: Comedy drama
- Created by: Mick Ford
- Written by: Mick Ford; Jimmy Dowdall (2 episodes); Jamoe Franser (2 episodes)
- Directed by: Philippa Langdale (3 episodes); Saul Metzstein (3 episodes); Anthony Philipson (2 episodes)
- Starring: Philip Glenister; Lesley Sharp; Rosie Day; Brenock O'Connor; Leslie Jordan; Paula Wilcox; Kevin Nash; Michael Ray Davis; Jimmy Akingbola; Kim Fields; Jane McNeill; Jonathan Jude
- Composer: Oli Julian
- Country of origin: United Kingdom
- Original language: English
- No. of series: 2
- No. of episodes: 12

Production
- Executive producers: Luke Alkin; Kenton Allen; Matthew Justice
- Producer: James Dean
- Running time: 50 minutes (including adverts)
- Production company: Big Talk Productions

Original release
- Network: Sky One
- Release: 2 November 2017 – 12 February 2019

Living the Dream is a British comedy drama series that first aired on 2 November 2017 on Sky One. The series centres around the Pemberton family, who move from Yorkshire to Florida.

== Cast ==
- Philip Glenister as Mal Pemberton
- Lesley Sharp as Jen Pemberton
- Rosie Day as Tina Pemberton
- Brenock O'Connor as Freddie Pemberton
- Leslie Jordan as Aiden
- Paula Wilcox as Maureen
- Kevin Nash as Troy
- Michael Ray Davis as Pastor William
- John Crosby as Ryan
- Regina Curtin as Dorothy
- Kim Fields as Rhoda
- Randy Havens as Casper
- Jimmy Akingbola as Paul
- Skylar McNamee as Conan Bloch
- David de Vries as Herman Bloch
- Jane McNeill as Larissa Bloch
- Jonathan Jude as Dylan Campbell

== Episodes ==
=== Series 1 (2017) ===
No. overall	No. in series	Title	Directed by	Written by	Original release date	UK viewers (millions)
1	1	"Adults Only"	Saul Metzstein	Mick Ford	2 November 2017	N/A
When the Pemberton family swap Yorkshire for a new life in Florida they take on the running of a trailer park, but find the eccentric residents are not keen on their planned changes.
2	2	"Gators for Cougars"	Saul Metzstein	Mick Ford	9 November 2017	0.63
The Pembertons have not got life in Florida off to the best of starts. Mal tries to keep the peace with the bullying Troy, Tina and Freddie struggle to get to grips with High School and Rhonda invites Jen to lunch.
3	3	"True Love Waits"	Saul Metzstein	Mick Ford	16 November 2017	0.64
The park's septic tank explodes and Mal and Jen are forced to turn to the only sewage expert around: Mayor Herman Bloch.
4	4	"Krakatoa"	Philippa Langdale	Mick Ford	23 November 2017	N/A
Pemberton sees an opportunity when Troy's arch rival from his wrestling days challenges him to a grudge match in his RV park.
5	5	"Blind Test"	Philippa Langdale	Mick Ford	30 November 2017	N/A
Due to a mistake by Mal, Jen's overcritical mother Maureen arrives in Florida 3 weeks early. Mal and Freddie come up with a money-making scheme - hosting an unusual wedding.
6	6	"Snake in the Grass"	Philippa Langdale	Mick Ford	7 December 2017	N/A
Following the success of the wedding, Mal and Jen splash out on a makeover of the park and a local TV advert. Then they receive a letter from a lawyer that prompts Mal to seek out the co-owner of the park.

=== Series 2 (2019) ===
No. overall	No. in series	Title	Directed by	Written by	Original release date	UK viewers (millions)
1	1	"Steak Out"	Saul Metzstein	Jimmy Dowdall	8 January 2019	N/A
An attempted burglary prompts Mal to buy a gun behind Jen's back. There are some very dodgy brownies on offer when they visit their new neighbours. Tina tries to find a way to dump Conan and Freddie falls for he class bad girl.
2	2	"Visa Tambien"	Saul Metzstein	Jamie Fraser	15 January 2019	N/A
Visa problems force Mal to fire Jen putting a strain on their relationship. With too much free time on her hands Jen begins to worry that Freddie may be dealing drugs. Tina and Herman plot Conan's future.
3	3	"The British Method"	Saul Metzstein	Jacquetta May	22 January 2019	N/A
New employee Stacee ruffles a few feathers by making big changes at the RV park. Jen restarts her sports physio career working for a star golfer. Mal and new resident Marvin get into trouble when they go hunting wild boar.
4	4	"Pickled Eggs"	Anthony Philipson	Jimmy Dowdall	29 January 2019	N/A
Mal is having a crisis of masculinity as he approaches 50. The park residents try to help with an ancient ceremony, while his family plan a surprise party. Tina is on the trail of a student putting on an illegal rave.
5	5	"Awards Season"	Anthony Philipson	Perrie Balthazar & Jamie Fraser	5 February 2019	N/A
It's the RV Park of the year awards and Kissimmee Sunshine could win Best Park. Mal is certain the judges are staying in the park and everyone is a suspect. Larissa suggests Jen should bring TJ to the awards ceremony.
6	6	"Endangered Species"	Anthony Philipson	Jamie Fraser	12 February 2019	N/A
Mayor Bloch is up for re-election and has made a campaign promise to close RV parks. A furious Mal choose one of the park residents to run for office against Bloch and has to get them ready for a televised debate at the Park.
