= David de Lautour =

New Zealand television actor (born 1982)

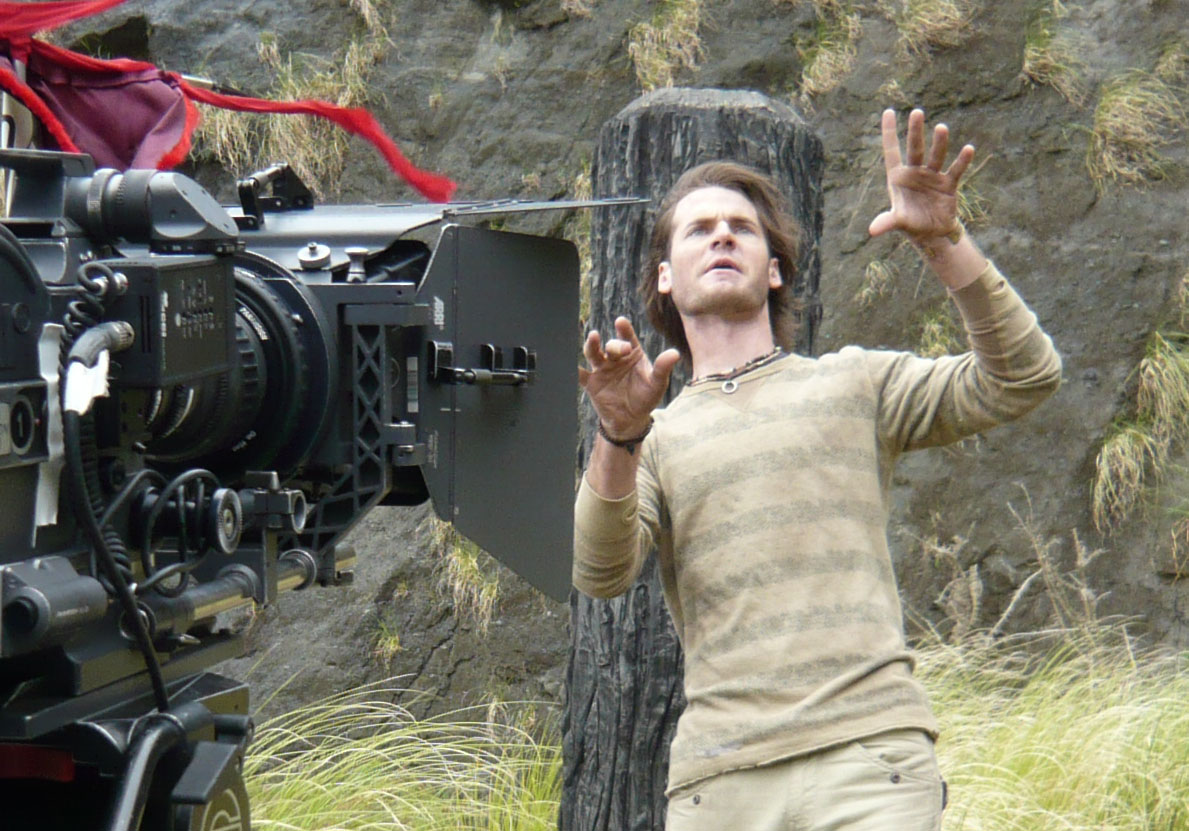
- Born: David Hugh de Lautour; Christchurch, Canterbury, New Zealand
- Occupations: Actor, Director, Producer
- Years active: 1996–present
- Known for: Westside; Wentworth; Power Rangers: Jungle Fury

David Hugh de Lautour (born 28 November 1982) is a New Zealand television actor, producer and director. He was born in Christchurch, Canterbury, New Zealand and attended King's College, then The American Musical and Dramatic Academy (AMDA) to which he received a $50,000 scholarship.

== Career ==
He has appeared in such television shows as Being Eve, What I Like About You, Xena: Warrior Princess, NCIS: Los Angeles, Legend of the Seeker, and Power Rangers Jungle Fury.

De Lautour started the production company Tool Shed Productions in 2006 which has produced a number of films, stage plays and his band, Four Tribe Native.

De Lautour did the voice and motion capture for Vergil in the 2013 video game DmC: Devil May Cry.

In 2014, he attended Power Morphicon 4, 22–24 August 2014 in Pasadena, California.

From 2015-2020, he played the leading character Ted West in Westside a prequel television series to Outrageous Fortune.

Starting in 2019 he played Forensic Psychiatrist Greg Miller in the seventh season of Wentworth. De Lautour returned for the final season of Wentworth.

In 2024, De Lautour appeared in NZ series Dark City: The Cleaner.

On 30 May, he was named as one of the directors for upcoming New Zealand series Ms. X.

== Filmography ==
=== Acting credits ===
==== Film ====
Year	Title	Role	Notes
2009	Isosceles	Jesse	Short film
2011	The Brightest Sunday	Jack	Short film
2014	Don't Blink	Noah	
2014	The Kick	Stephen Donald	Biopic film

==== Television ====
Year	Title	Role	Notes
1996–1999	Xena: Warrior Princess	Icus; Lief	"Altared States" (S01E19) "Fallen Angel" (S05E01)
2001–2002	Being Eve	Adam Le Beau	Guest, 15 episodes
2004–2005	What I Like About You	Ben Sheffield	Guest, 21 episodes
2008	The Amazing Extraordinary Friends	Parker Pen	"Doctor Zeno and his Monster Battle-Bot" (S02E08)
2008	Power Rangers Jungle Fury	Robert 'RJ' James / Jungle Fury Wolf Ranger	Main role, 32 Episodes
2008–2009	Legend of the Seeker	Michael Cypher	"Prophecy" (S01E01) "Destiny" (S01E02) "Home" (S01E12) "Hartland" (S01E14)
2010	NCIS	Daniel Sturgis	"Jet Lag" (S07E13)
2010	The Glades	Lenny Nelson	"Doppelganger" (S01E06)
2012	Touch	Simon Plimpton	"Pilot" (S01E01) "Safety in Numbers" (S01E03) "The Road Not Taken" (S01E13)
2013	A-Holes Anonymous	Russ	"Meet Crystal Cleary" (S01E05) "Mr Right"(S01E07) "The Notebook" (S01E09)
2013	Hart of Dixie	Oliver Kent	"Islands in the Stream" (S02E12)
2013	Touch	Simon Plimpton	"Two of a Kind" (S02E10)
2013	Mom	Greg	"Pilot" (S01E01)
2013	Beauty & the Beast	Sebastian Clifton	"Liar, Liar" (S02E03)
2013	NCIS: Los Angeles	Roy Kessler	"Fallout" (S05E08)
2014	Once Upon a Time	Jonathan	"Bleeding Through" (S03E18)
2014	HelLA	Indecisive Guy	"LA Coffee Shops" (S01E11)
2015–2020	Westside	Ted West	Main role; prequel to Outrageous Fortune
2015	This Is Why We're Single	Adam	"Why You Should Never Google Someone Before a First Date" (S01E01)
2019–2021	Wentworth	Dr. Greg Miller	Recurring role; 27 episodes
2021	Shortland Street	Liam Shaw	19 episodes
2021	Written in the Stars	Carter Bowman	TV Movie
2024	Dark City: The Cleaner	DSS David Calhoun	TV series 6 episodes
2024	The Brokenwood Mysteries	Richie Wright	1 episode
2025	Vince	Leon	TV series (1.4)
2026	Settling	Danny	TV series

==== Video games ====
Year	Title	Role	Notes
2013	DmC: Devil May Cry	Vergil	Voice & Mo-Cap
2013	DmC: Devil May Cry: Vergil's Downfall	Vergil	Voice & Mo-Cap (DLC)
2015	DmC: Devil May Cry: Definitive Edition	Vergil	Voice & Mo-Cap (Remastered Edition)
2015	Mad Max	Crow Dazzle	Voice
2016	Battlefield 1	Whitehall	Voice & Mo-Cap
2019	Power Rangers: Battle for the Grid	Robert "RJ" James	Voice
2021	Path of Exile	The Trialmaster	Voice

=== Filmmaking credits ===
==== Film ====
Year	Title	Director	Writer	Notes
2009	Isosceles	No	Yes	Short
2009	Blessed Are They	No	Yes	Short
2010	Love, Serene	Yes	Yes	Short
2011	The Brightest Sunday	Yes	Yes	Short
2013	The Act Off	No	Yes	Short
2014	Operation: Ice	No	Yes	Short
2014	Izzy Girl	Yes	No	Short
2015	Bleed Black	Yes	No	Short
2017	Undocumented	Yes	No	TV Movie

==== Television ====
Year	Title	Director	Writer	Notes
2019	Westside	Yes	No	2 episodes
2021	Alibi	Yes	Yes	7 episodes
2022	My Life Is Murder	Yes	No	2 episodes
2022-23	The Brokenwood Mysteries	Yes	No	3 episodes
2026	Ms. X	Yes	Yes	TBA
