= Birrarangga Film Festival =

International film festival of indigenous films held in Melbourne, Australia

The Birrarangga Film Festival (BFF) is a biennial film festival held in Melbourne (Naarm), Australia, focusing on indigenous filmmakers from around the world.

== Background ==
The Birrarangga Film Festival was founded by Aboriginal Australian actor, playwright, screenwriter, and producer Tony Briggs in 2019. The name is derived from the Woiwurrung language, meaning "river location"; there is both symbolic value ("rivers connect Indigenous people across the world and have fluidity, movement and life, just as films do"), and relates to the venue of the inaugural festival at the Australian Centre for the Moving Image (ACMI), which is located on the banks of the Yarra River.

The Victorian Government is a partner of the festival via VicScreen (formerly Film Victoria).

== Festival editions ==
The first festival ran for four days, from 16 April to 29 April 2019. The festival opened with the Australian premiere of the Canadian film Edge of the Knife (SG̲aawaay Ḵ'uuna), the first film entirely made in the Haida Gwaii language.

In 2021, the opening night film was the award-winning Firestarter – The Story of Bangarra, screened on 11 March. Other films included – Mothers of the Land (Sembradoras de Vida) from Peru; Eating Up Easter (USA/Chile), and the Canadian horror film Blood Quantum. Panel discussions included Leah Purcell, Bain Stewart, Tony Birch, and Tracey Rigney.

The third edition of the biennial festival, which showcases films by indigenous filmmakers from around the world, runs for six days from 23 to 28 March 2023, with screenings at multiple venues, including The Capitol (where the opening film was screened), ACMI, Lido, and Classic cinemas, the Victorian Pride Centre, and Federation Square. Its opening night film is Canadian film Bones of Crows. As well as the dozens of feature films being shown is Arran 360°, a film project by six Sámi artists from across Sápmi, the cultural region extending across northern Norway, Sweden, Finland and Russia. Six films are screened at Deakin University’s Waurn Ponds campus in Geelong, which has a specialised 360° screen. Other films include A Boy Called Piano (New Zealand); Sweet As (Australia); Run Woman Run; Muru, The Drover's Wife: The Legend of Molly Johnson. Several of the films explore LGBTQIA+ themes.
