= Māori Language Day =

Commemoration of the Maori language

Māori Language Day is observed annually on 14 September. Ngā Tamatoa presented a petition to parliament on 14 September 1972 calling for Te Reo Māori to be introduced in primary schools throughout New Zealand.
