= Māori language =

Polynesian language spoken in New Zealand

Māori
- Māori, te reo Māori
- Pronunciation: [ˈmaːɔɾi]
- Native to: New Zealand
- Region: Polynesia
- Ethnicity: Māori
- Native speakers: 50,000 (well or very well) (2015); 186,000 (some knowledge) (2018)
- Language family: Austronesian: Malayo-Polynesian; Oceanic; Central Pacific; East Central Pacific; Nuclear Polynesian; Eastern Polynesian; Tahitic; Māori–Moriori; Māori
- Early form: Proto-Polynesian
- Standard forms: Standard Māori
- Dialects: Māori dialects
- Writing system: Latin (Māori alphabet); Māori Braille

Official status
- Official language in: New Zealand
- Regulated by: Māori Language Commission

Language codes
- ISO 639-1: mi
- ISO 639-2: mao (B) mri (T)
- ISO 639-3: mri
- Glottolog: maor1246
- ELP: Māori
- Linguasphere: 39-CAQ-a
- IETF: mi-NZ
- Māori is classified as Definitely Endangered by the UNESCO Atlas of the World's Languages in Danger (2010).

Māori (Māori: [ˈmaːɔɾi]; endonym: te reo Māori [tɛ ɾɛɔ ˈmaːɔɾi], 'the Māori language', also shortened to te reo) is an Eastern Polynesian language and the language of the Māori people, the indigenous population of mainland New Zealand. The southernmost member of the Austronesian language family, it is related to Cook Islands Māori, Moriori, Tuamotuan, and Tahitian. The Māori Language Act 1987 gave the language recognition as one of New Zealand's official languages. There are regional dialects of the Māori language. Prior to contact with Europeans, Māori lacked a written language or script. (Note: Male facial tā moko (tattoos) of the 19th century have been posited as a form of textual language, but do not correlate to spoken Māori.) Written Māori now uses the Latin script, which was adopted and the spelling standardised by Northern Māori in collaboration with English Protestant clergy in the 19th century.

In the second half of the 19th century, European children in rural areas spoke Māori with Māori children. It was common for prominent parents of these children, such as government officials, to use Māori in the community. Māori declined due to the increase of the European population and government-imposed educational policies; by the early 20th century its use was banned in school playgrounds and classrooms across the country. The number of speakers fell sharply after 1945, but a Māori language revival movement began in the late 20th century and slowed the decline. The Māori protest movement and the Māori renaissance of the 1970s caused greater social awareness of and support for the language.

The 2018 New Zealand census reported that about 190,000 people, or 4% of the population, could hold an everyday conversation in Māori. As of 2015, 55% of Māori adults reported some knowledge of the language; of these, 64% use Māori at home and around 50,000 people can speak the language "well". As of 2023, around 7% of New Zealand primary and secondary school students are taught fully or partially in Māori, and another 24% learn Māori as an additional language.

In Māori culture, the language is considered to be among the greatest of all taonga, or cultural treasures. Māori is known for its metaphorical poetry and prose, often in the form of karakia, whaikōrero, whakapapa and karanga, and in performing arts such as mōteatea, waiata, and haka.

== Name ==
The English word Maori is a borrowing from the Māori language, where it is spelled Māori. In New Zealand, the Māori language is often referred to as te reo [tɛ ˈɾɛ.ɔ] ("the language"), short for te reo Māori ("the Māori language").

The Māori-language spelling with a macron ⟨Māori⟩ has become common in New Zealand English in recent years, particularly in Māori-specific cultural contexts, although the traditional macron-less English spelling is still sometimes seen in general media and government use.

The pronunciation in Māori and current standard New Zealand English is /ˈma:ɔri/, with the 'r' usually a flap. A more anglicised pronunciation is /ˈmaʊriː/.

== Official status ==
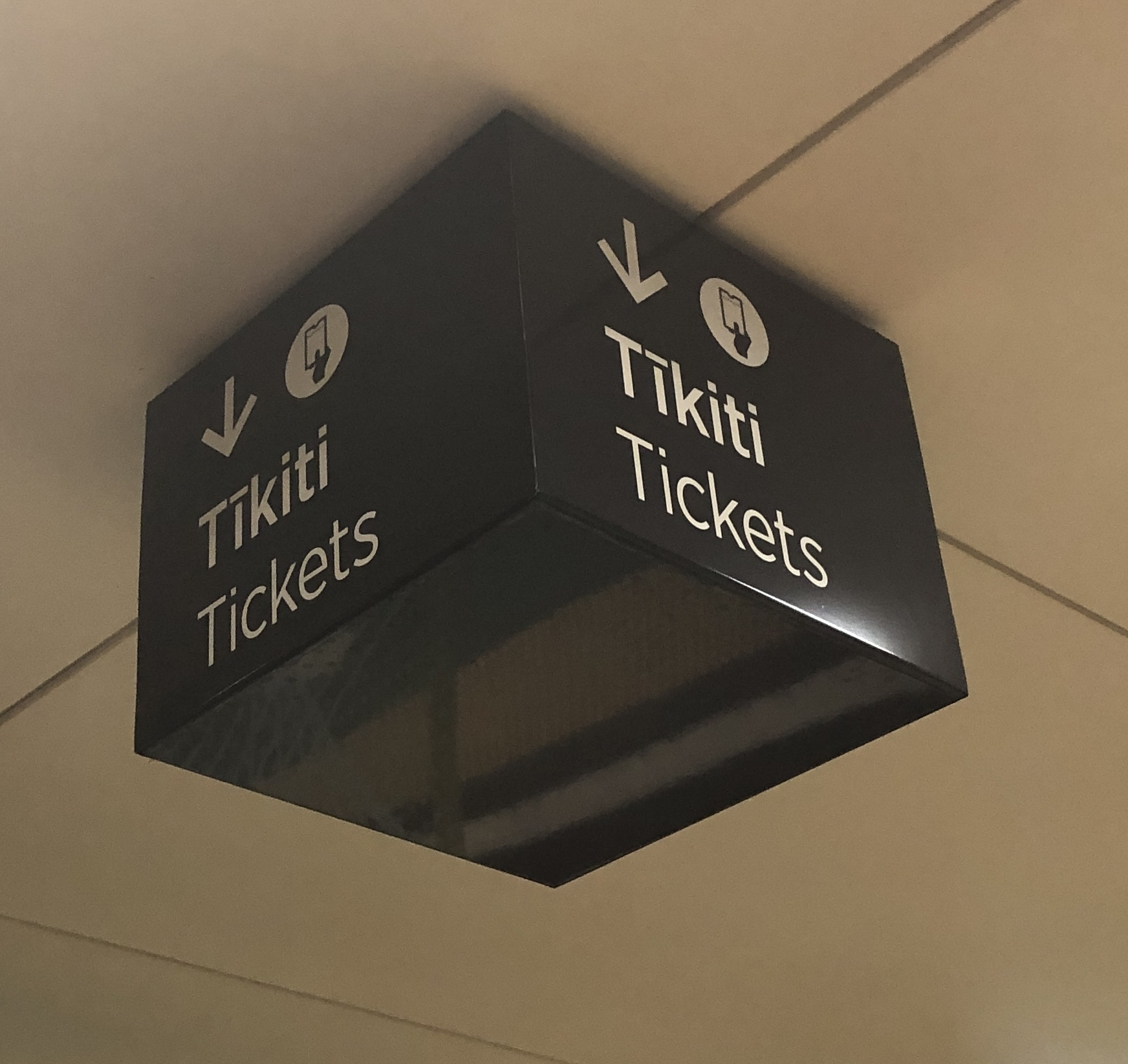
Bilingual sign at a railway station in Auckland, New Zealand

New Zealand has three official languages; New Zealand Sign Language, te reo Māori, and English. Te reo Māori gained its official status with the passing of the Māori Language Act 1987.

Most government departments and agencies have bilingual names—for example, the Department of Internal Affairs is alternatively Te Tari Taiwhenua—and places such as local government offices and public libraries display bilingual signs and use bilingual stationery; some government services now even use the Māori version solely as the official name. Personal dealings with government agencies may be conducted in Māori, but in practice, this almost always requires interpreters, restricting its everyday use to the limited geographical areas of high Māori fluency, and to more formal occasions, such as during public consultation. An interpreter is on hand at sessions of the New Zealand Parliament for instances when a member wishes to speak in Māori. Māori may be spoken in judicial proceedings, but any party wishing to do so must notify the court in advance to ensure an interpreter is available. Failure to notify in advance does not preclude the party speaking in Māori, but the court must be adjourned until an interpreter is available and the party may be held liable for the costs of the delay.

A 1994 ruling by the Judicial Committee of the Privy Council (then New Zealand's highest court) held the Government responsible under the Treaty of Waitangi (1840) for the preservation of the language. Accordingly, since March 2004, the state has funded Māori Television, broadcast partly in Māori. On 28 March 2008, Māori Television launched its second channel, Te Reo, broadcast entirely in the Māori language, with no advertising or subtitles. The first Māori TV channel, Aotearoa Television Network (ATN) was available to viewers in the Auckland region from 1996 but lasted for only one year.

In 2008, Land Information New Zealand published the first list of official place names with macrons. Previous place name lists were derived from computer systems (usually mapping and geographic information systems) that could not handle macrons.

=== Political dimensions ===
The official status of Māori, and especially its use in official names and titles, is a political issue in New Zealand. In 2022 a 70,000-strong petition from Te Pāti Māori went to Parliament calling for New Zealand to be officially renamed Aotearoa, and was accepted for debate by the Māori Affairs select committee. During New Zealand First's successful campaign to return to Parliament in 2023, party leader Winston Peters ridiculed the proposal as "ideological mumbo jumbo" and criticised the use of the name in government reports. Peters promised his party would remove Māori names from government departments, saying "Te Whatu Ora, excuse me, I don't want to speak the Māori language when I go to hospital." As part of its coalition agreement with New Zealand First, the National-led government agreed to ensure all public service departments had their primary name in English except for those specifically related to Māori.

In 2025, Radio New Zealand reported that education minister Erica Stanford had decided the previous year to exclude most Māori words from the Education Ministry's "Ready to Read Phonics Plus" series. Stanford said that the decision affected only 12 books within the series and that 27 books with Māori words would be reprinted. The decision was described as "over-reach" by the New Zealand Principals' Federation and sharply criticised as an "act of racism" by writers and publishers.

== Demographics ==
Place	Māori-speaking population
New Zealand	185,955
Queensland	4,264
Western Australia	2,859
New South Wales	2,429
Victoria	1,680
South Australia	222
Northern Territory	178
Australian Capital Territory	58
Tasmania	52

== Online translators ==
Māori is available on Google Translate, Microsoft Translator, Yandex Translate, and DeepL Translator.

== History ==
=== Origins ===
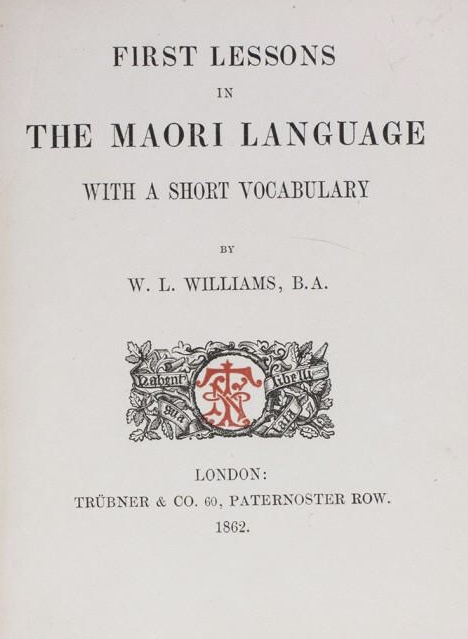
"First Lessons in the Maori Language", 1862, by W. L. Williams, third Bishop of Waiapu

According to legend, Māori came to New Zealand from Hawaiki. Current anthropological thinking places their origin in eastern Polynesia, mostly likely from the Southern Cook or Society Islands region (see Māori history § Origins from Polynesia), and says that they arrived by deliberate voyages in seagoing canoes, possibly double-hulled, and probably sail-rigged. These settlers probably arrived by AD 1350 at the latest.

Māori evolved in isolation from other sister Polynesian languages adapting to New Zealand's unique geographical features and temperate climate (including presence of snow and loss of tropical floral inventory). Six dialectal variations emerged among iwi due to further internal geographical separation. The language had no written form, but historian Sarah J. K. Gallagher has argued that tā moko, the indigenous art of tattooing, is arguably "a pre-European textual culture in New Zealand... as the Moko can be read, it can be accepted as a form of communication". The idea that tā moko is a written language of sorts has been discussed before.

Since its origin, the Māori language has been rich in metaphorical poetry and prose. Forms of this include karakia, whaikōrero, whakapapa and karanga, and in performing arts such as mōteatea, waiata and haka. Karakia are Māori incantations used to invoke spiritual guidance and protection, and are used before eating or gathering, to increase spiritual goodwill and to declare things officially open. Whaikōrero is the term given to traditional oratory given on marae, and whakapapa is the story of one's ancestry. According to historian Atholl Anderson, whakapapa used "mnemonic devices, repetitive patterns [and] rhyme" to leave a lasting impression. "Casting knowledge in formulaic or other standarised story forms... helped to fix the information in the minds of speakers and listeners".

=== European contact ===
Missionaries learned to speak Māori, and introduced the Latin alphabet to Māori. The Church Mission Society (CMS), including Thomas Kendall; Māori, including Tītore and Hongi Hika; and Cambridge University's Samuel Lee, developed the written form of the language between 1817 and 1830. In 1833, while living in the Paihia mission-house of Anglican priest and the now head of the New Zealand CMS mission, Rev Henry Williams, missioner William Colenso published Māori translations including parts of books of the Bible, the first books printed in New Zealand. Colenso's 1837 Māori New Testament was the first indigenous-language translation of the Bible published in the southern hemisphere. Demand for the Māori New Testament, and for the Prayer Book that followed, grew exponentially, as did Christian Māori leadership and public Christian services, with 33,000 Māori soon attending regularly. Literacy and understanding the Bible increased mana and social and economic benefits. Worship took place in Māori; it functioned as the language of Māori homes; Māori politicians conducted political meetings in Māori; and some literature appeared in Māori, along with many newspapers. Before 1880, some Māori parliamentarians suffered disadvantages because parliamentary proceedings took place in English. However, by 1900, all Māori members of parliament, such as Āpirana Ngata, were university graduates who spoke fluent English.

=== Suppression and decline ===
Efforts to culturally assimilate Māori into European society began in the 19th century. This included policies to educate Māori based on the English school system, with steps taken that increasingly promoted English as the sole language of use in schools. These adversely affected the use of the Maori language by Maori children. The Education Ordinance Act 1847 set English as the predominant language of schools. This was followed in 1880 by the Native Schools Code, which placed further restrictions on the use of Māori, establishing the expectation that teachers would have some knowledge of the language solely for the purpose of teaching English to younger pupils. Further restrictions on Māori followed, to the point that in the early twentieth century, children were forbidden to speak it in the classroom or playground, under penalty of corporal punishment. In recent years, prominent Māori have spoken with sadness about their experiences or experiences of their family members being caned, strapped or beaten in school.

In many cases these policies were accepted or even encouraged by parents who wanted their children to succeed in the Pākehā world around them; however, it remained government policy to educate Māori in manual trades rather than academic professions until the mid-twentieth century. Proposals in 1930 to introduce Māori to the curriculum were blocked on the grounds that the purpose of education was to "lead the Māori lad to be a good farmer and the Māori girl to be a good farmer's wife".

Most Māori people continued to speak Māori as their first language until World War II. The number of speakers of Māori began to decline rapidly with the migration of Māori to urban areas after the war (the urban Māori). By the 1980s, fewer than 20 per cent of Māori spoke the language well enough to be classed as native speakers. Even many of those people no longer spoke Māori in their homes. As a result, many Māori children failed to learn their ancestral language, and generations of non-Māori-speaking Māori emerged.

In 1984, Naida Glavish, a tolls operator, was demoted for using the Māori greeting "kia ora" with customers. The "Kia Ora Incident" was the subject of public and political scrutiny before having her job reinstated by Prime Minister Robert Muldoon, and became a major symbol of long-standing linguicism in New Zealand.

=== Revitalisation efforts ===
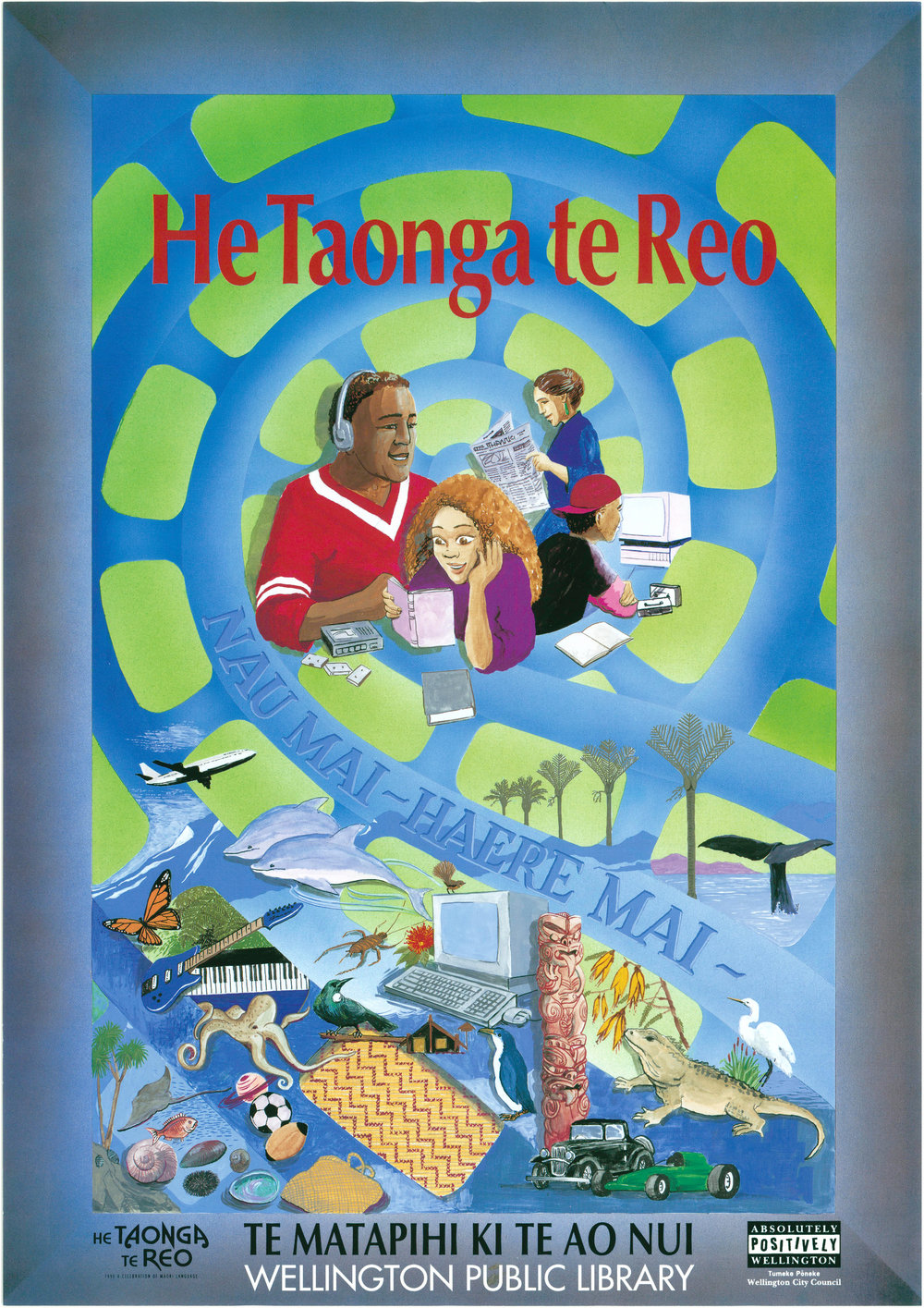
He Taonga Te Reo – a celebration of Maori Language poster, Wellington Public Library (1995)

Maori Speakers in New Zealand
Year	Maori Speakers	Total Stated	%
1996	153,669	3,433,906	4.48
2001	160,527	3,563,796	4.50
2006	157,113	3,830,757	4.10
2013	148,395	3,973,359	3.73
2018	185,955	4,699,755	3.96
2023	213,849	4,993,923	4.28

By the 1950s some Māori leaders had begun to recognise the dangers of the loss of te reo Māori. By the 1970s there were many strategies used to save the language. This included Māori-language revitalisation programs such as the Kōhanga Reo movement, which from 1982 immersed infants in Māori from infancy to school age. There followed in 1985 the founding of the first Kura Kaupapa Māori (Years 1 to 8 Māori-medium education programme) and later the first Wharekura (Years 9 to 13 Māori-medium education programme). In 2011 it was reported that although "there was a true revival of te reo in the 1980s and early to mid-1990s ... spurred on by the realisation of how few speakers were left, and by the relative abundance of older fluent speakers in both urban neighbourhoods and rural communities", the language has continued to decline." The decline is believed "to have several underlying causes". These include:

- the ongoing loss of older native speakers who have spearheaded the Māori-language revival movement
- complacency brought about by the very existence of the institutions which drove the revival
- concerns about quality, with the supply of good teachers never matching demand (even while that demand has been shrinking)
- excessive regulation and centralised control, which has alienated some of those involved in the movement
- an ongoing lack of educational resources needed to teach the full curriculum in te reo Māori
- natural language attrition caused by the overwhelming increase of spoken English.

Based on the principles of partnership, Māori-speaking government, general revitalisation and dialectal protective policy, and adequate resourcing, the Waitangi Tribunal has recommended "four fundamental changes":

1. Te Taura Whiri (the Māori Language Commission) should become the lead Māori language sector agency. This will address the problems caused by the lack of ownership and leadership identified by the Office of the Auditor-General.
2. Te Taura Whiri should function as a Crown–Māori partnership through the equal appointment of Crown and Māori appointees to its board. This reflects [the Tribunal's] concern that te reo revival will not work if responsibility for setting the direction is not shared with Māori.
3. Te Taura Whiri will also need increased powers. This will ensure that public bodies are compelled to contribute to te reo's revival and that key agencies are held properly accountable for the strategies they adopt. For instance, targets for the training of te reo teachers must be met, education curricula involving te reo must be approved, and public bodies in districts with a sufficient number and/or proportion of te reo speakers and schools with a certain proportion of Māori students must submit Māori language plans for approval.
4. These regional public bodies and schools must also consult iwi (Māori tribes or tribal confederations) in the preparation of their plans. In this way, iwi will come to have a central role in the revitalisation of te reo in their own areas. This should encourage efforts to promote the language at the grassroots.

The changes set forth by the Tribunal are merely recommendations; they are not binding upon government.

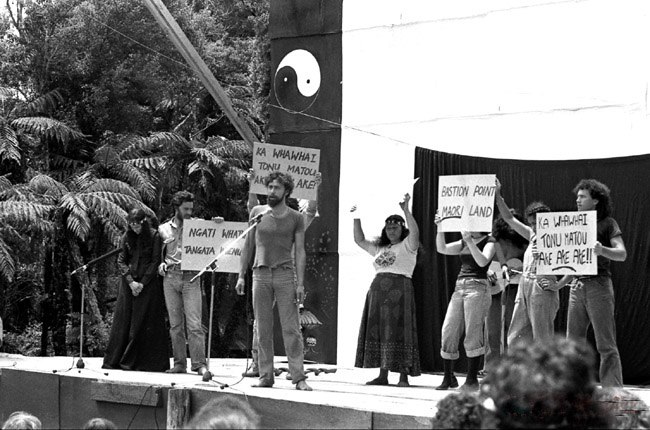
Bastion Point land rights activists with Māori-language signs

There is, however, evidence that the revitalisation efforts are taking hold, as can be seen in the teaching of te reo in the school curriculum, the use of Māori as an instructional language, and the supportive ideologies surrounding these efforts. In 2014, a survey of students ranging in age from 18 to 24 was conducted; the students were of mixed ethnic backgrounds, ranging from Pākehā to Māori who lived in New Zealand. This survey showed a 62% response saying that te reo Māori was at risk. Albury argues that these results come from the language either not being used enough in common discourse, or from the fact that the number of speakers was inadequate for future language development.

The policies for language revitalisation have been changing in attempts to improve Māori language use and have been working with suggestions from the Waitangi Tribunal on the best ways to implement the revitalisation. The Waitangi Tribunal in 2011 identified a suggestion for language revitalisation that would shift indigenous policies from the central government to the preferences and ideologies of the Māori people. This change recognises the issue of Māori revitalisation as one of indigenous self-determination, instead of the job of the government to identify what would be best for the language and Māori people of New Zealand.

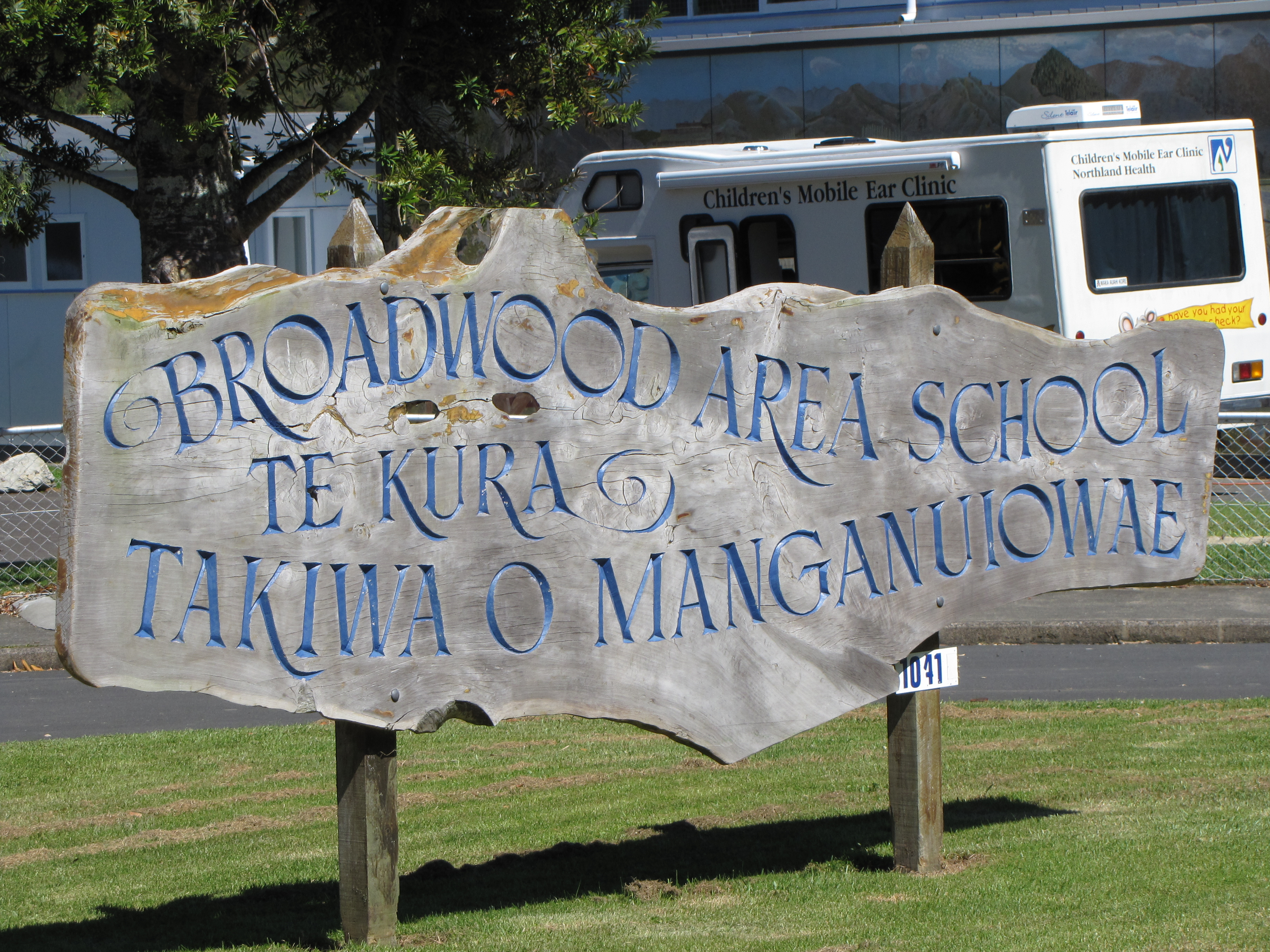
Bilingual sign in Broadwood, Northland

=== Revival since 2015 ===
Beginning in about 2015, the Māori language underwent a revival as it became increasingly popular, as a common national heritage and shared cultural identity, even among New Zealanders without Māori roots. Surveys from 2018 indicated that "the Māori language currently enjoys a high status in Māori society and also positive acceptance by the majority of non-Māori New Zealanders".

As the status and prestige of the language rose, so did the demand for language classes. Businesses, including Google, Microsoft, Vodafone NZ and Fletcher Building, were quick to adopt the trend as it became apparent that using te reo made customers think of a company as "committed to New Zealand". The language became increasingly heard in the media and in politics. Prime Minister Jacinda Ardern—who gave her daughter a Māori middle name, and said she would learn both Māori and English—made headlines when she toasted Commonwealth leaders in 2018 with a Māori proverb, and the success of Māori musical groups such as Alien Weaponry and Maimoa further increased the language's presence in social media. Since 2017, a selected number of Disney movies have received a dubbing in Māori, the first being Moana.

In August 2017, Rotorua became the first city in New Zealand to declare itself as bilingual in the Māori and English languages, meaning that both languages would be promoted. In 2019, the New Zealand government launched the Maihi Karauna Māori language revitalisation strategy with a goal of 1 million people speaking te reo Māori by 2040. Also in 2019, Kotahi Rau Pukapuka Trust and Auckland University Press began work on publishing a sizeable library of local and international literature in the language, including the Harry Potter books.

Some New Zealanders have pushed against the revival, debating the replacement of English-language place names with original Māori names, criticising a police car having Māori language and graphics, and complaining about te reo Māori being used by broadcasters. In March 2021, the Broadcasting Standards Authority (BSA) said it would no longer entertain complaints regarding the use of the Māori language in broadcasts. This followed a fivefold increase in complaints to the BSA. The use of Māori in itself does not breach any broadcasting standards.

== Dialects ==
North Island dialects

Biggs proposed that historically there were two major dialect groups, North Island and South Island, and that South Island Māori is extinct. Biggs has analysed North Island Māori as comprising a western group and an eastern group with the boundary between them running pretty much along the island's north–south axis.

Within these broad divisions regional variations occur, and individual regions show tribal variations. The major differences occur in the pronunciation of words, variation of vocabulary, and idiom. A fluent speaker of Māori has no problem understanding other dialects.

There is no significant variation in grammar between dialects. "Most of the tribal variation in grammar is a matter of preferences: speakers of one area might prefer one grammatical form to another, but are likely on occasion to use the non-preferred form, and at least to recognise and understand it." Vocabulary and pronunciation vary to a greater extent, but this does not pose barriers to communication.

=== Northern dialects ===
In the northern dialects, particularly in Muriwhenua and parts of Ngāpuhi, the digraph wh is not pronounced as ⟨f⟩, as it is in most of the other dialects, but as a voiceless bilabial fricative ⟨ɸ⟩. Some speakers also reduce this sound to ⟨h⟩, particularly in words beginning with the causative prefix whaka- (e.g. whakarongo), leading to the pronunciation being heard as haka- (e.g. hakarongo or 'hakarongo).

Speakers of the northern dialect, like other dialects, also have preferences for specific renderings of words (e.g. kāhore instead of kāore, kaurua/kourua instead of kōrua, etc.), or entirely unique words (e.g. kūkupa instead of kererū, whareiti instead of wharepaku, etc.)

=== Eastern and western dialects ===
In the southwest of the North Island, in the Whanganui and Taranaki regions, the phoneme ⟨h⟩ is a glottal stop and the phoneme ⟨wh⟩ is [ʔw]. This difference was the subject of considerable debate during the 1990s and 2000s over the then-proposed change of the name of the city Wanganui to Whanganui.

In Tūhoe and the Eastern Bay of Plenty (northeastern North Island) ⟨ng⟩ has merged with ⟨n⟩.

Speakers in Waikato–Tainui, also have preferences for renderings of words (e.g. ngētehi, ngāna and ngēnā instead of ētahi, āna or ēnā. Pēwhea and Kōwhatu instead of pēhea and pōhatu.)

=== Southern dialects ===
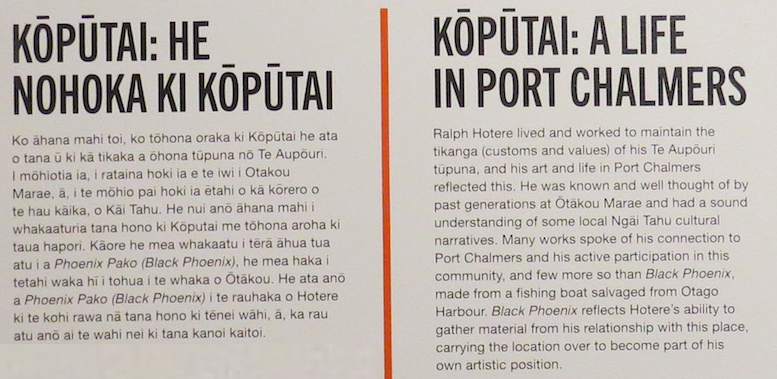
Part of the annotation to a Ralph Hotere exhibition at the Dunedin Public Art Gallery, written bilingually in English and southern Māori. Note several regional variations, such as nohoka (nohoanga, a place or seat), tikaka (tikanga, customs), āhana/ōhona (ana / ōna, alienable and inalienable "his"), pako (pango, black), and whaka (whanga, harbour).

In South Island dialects, ng merged into k in many regions. Thus Kāi Tahu and Ngāi Tahu are variations in the name of the same iwi (the latter form is the one used in Acts of Parliament). Since 2000, the government has altered the official names of several southern place names to the southern dialect forms by replacing ng with k. New Zealand's highest mountain, known for centuries as Aoraki in southern Māori dialects that merge ng with k, and as Aorangi by other Māori, was later named "Mount Cook". Now its sole official name is Aoraki / Mount Cook, which favours the local dialect form. Similarly, the Māori name for Stewart Island, Rakiura, is cognate with the name of the Canterbury town of Rangiora. Likewise, Dunedin's main research library, the Hocken Collections, has the name Uare Taoka o Hākena rather than the northern (standard) Te Whare Taonga o Hākena. (Note: The Hocken Library contains several early journals and notebooks of early missionaries documenting the vagaries of the southern dialect. Several of them are shown at Blackman, A. Some Sources for Southern Maori dialect.) Maarire Goodall and George Griffiths say there is also a voicing of k to g, which explains why the region of Otago (southern dialect) and the settlement it is named after – Ōtākou (standard Māori) – vary in spelling (the pronunciation of the latter having changed over time to accommodate the northern spelling).

The standard Māori r is also found occasionally changed to an l in these southern dialects and the wh to w. These changes are most commonly found in place names, such as Lake Waihola, and the nearby coastal settlement of Wangaloa (which would, in standard Māori, be rendered Whangaroa), and Little Akaloa, on Banks Peninsula. Goodall and Griffiths suggest that final vowels are given a centralised pronunciation as schwa or that they are elided (pronounced indistinctly or not at all), resulting in such seemingly bastardised place names as The Kilmog, which in standard Māori would have been rendered Kirimoko, but which in southern dialect would have been pronounced very much as the current name suggests. This same elision is found in numerous other southern placenames, such as the two small settlements called The Kaik (from the term for a fishing village, kāinga in standard Māori), near Palmerston and Akaroa, and the early spelling of Lake Wakatipu as Wagadib. In standard Māori, Wakatipu would have been rendered Whakatipua, showing further the elision of a final vowel. The name of Tomogalak Stream (a tributary of the Mataura River) also shows a combination of several of these dialect differences; in standard Māori its name would be rendered as Tomokarangi or Tawakarangi.

Despite the dialect being officially regarded as extinct, (Note: As with many "dead" languages, there is a possibility that the southern dialect may be revived, especially with the encouragement mentioned. "The Murihiku language – Mulihig' being probably better expressive of its state in 1844 – lives on in Watkin's vocabulary list and in many muttonbirding terms still in use, and may flourish again in the new climate of Maoritaka.") its use in signage and official documentation is encouraged by many government and educational agencies in Otago and Southland.

== Classification ==
- East Polynesian
  - Rapa Nui
  - Central Eastern
    - Tahitic
      - Māori
      - Rarotongan
      - Tahitian
      - Rapa
    - Marquesic
      - Hawaiian
      - - Marquesan
        - Mangareva

Comparative linguists classify Māori as a Polynesian language, specifically as an Eastern Polynesian language belonging to the Tahitic subgroup, which includes Cook Islands Māori, spoken in the southern Cook Islands, and Tahitian, spoken in Tahiti and the Society Islands. Other major Eastern Polynesian languages include Hawaiian, Marquesan (languages in the Marquesic subgroup), and the Rapa Nui language of Easter Island.

While the preceding are all distinct languages, they remain similar enough that Tupaia, a Tahitian travelling with Captain James Cook in 1769–1770, communicated effectively with Māori. Hawaiian newspaper Ka Nupepa Kuokoa in 1911 covering Ernest Kaʻai and his Royal Hawaiians' band tour of New Zealand reported that Kaʻai himself wrote to them about the band able to communicate with Māori while visiting their rural marae. Māori actors, travelling to Easter Island for production of the film Rapa-Nui noticed a marked similarity between the native tongues, as did arts curator Reuben Friend, who noted that it took only a short time to pick up any different vocabulary and the different nuances to recognisable words. Speakers of modern Māori generally report that they find the languages of the Cook Islands, including Rarotongan, the easiest among the other Polynesian languages to understand and converse in.

== Geographic distribution ==
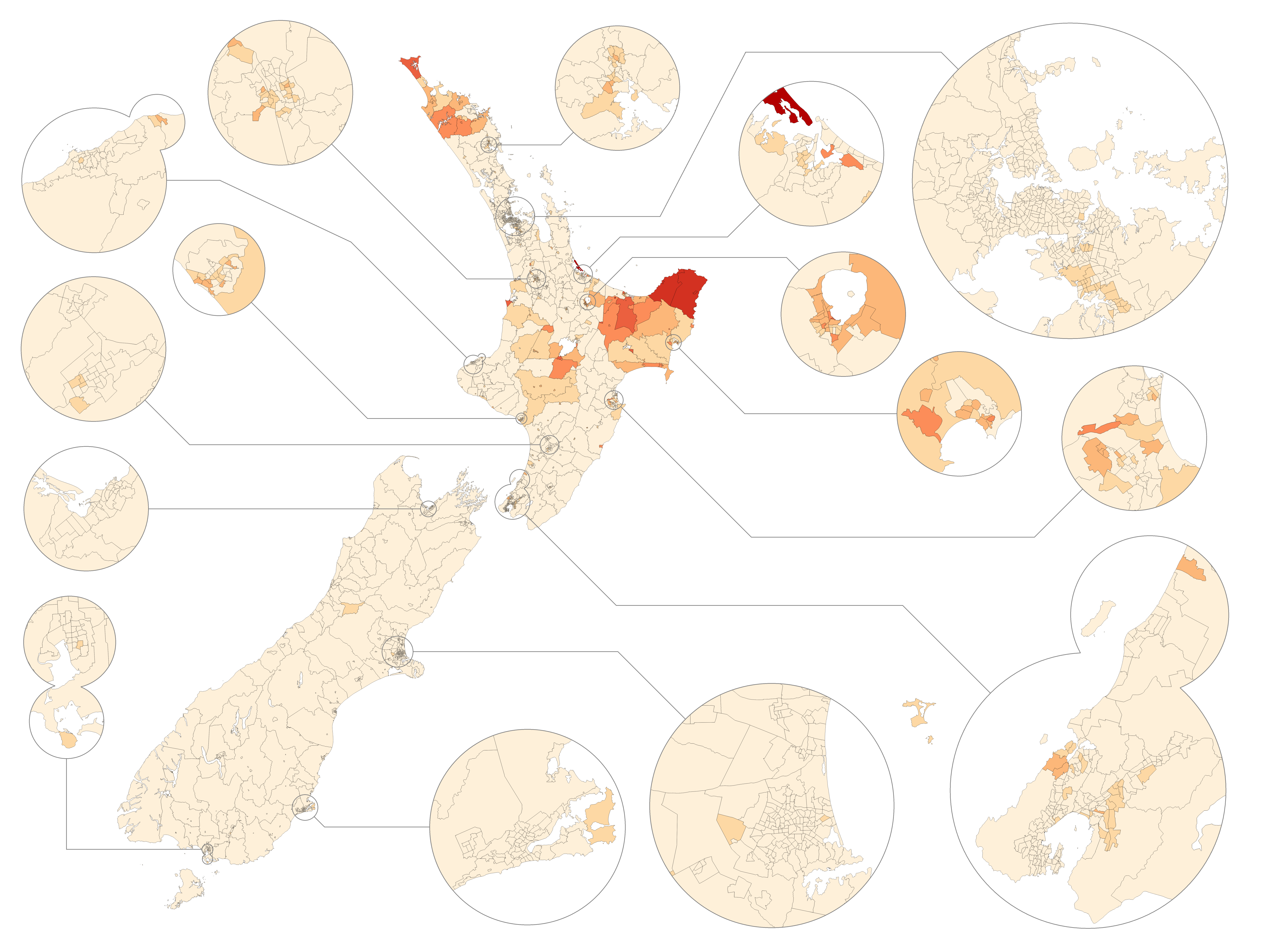
Speakers of Māori according to the 2013 census: < 5% 5–10% 10–20% 20–30% 30–40% 40–50% > 50%

Nearly all speakers are ethnic Māori residents of New Zealand. Estimates of the number of speakers vary: the 1996 census reported 160,000, while a 1995 national survey reported about 10,000 "very fluent" adult speakers. According to the 2023 New Zealand Census, 20.5% of people who identified with the Māori ethnic group could hold a conversation in te reo Māori, compared with 21.3% in 2013 and 20.6% in 2018. Although the proportion has declined slightly over the decade, the number of Māori speakers increased from 125,352 in 2013 to 182,001 in 2023. In 2023, Māori speakers represented 4.3% of New Zealand's total population, up from 3.7% in 2013.

The level of competence of self-professed Māori speakers varies from minimal to total. Statistics have not been gathered for the prevalence of different levels of competence. Only a minority of self-professed speakers use Māori as their main language at home. The rest use only a few words or phrases (passive bilingualism).

Māori still is a community language in some predominantly Māori settlements in the Northland, Urewera and East Cape areas. Kōhanga reo Māori-immersion kindergartens throughout New Zealand exclusively use Māori.

Urbanisation after the Second World War led to widespread language shift from Māori predominance (with Māori the primary language of the rural whānau) to English predominance (English serving as the primary language in the Pākehā cities). Therefore, Māori speakers almost always communicate bilingually, with New Zealand English as either their first or second language. Only around 9,000 people exclusively speak in Māori.

In the 2023 school year, around 7.2% of primary and secondary school students in New Zealand were taught fully or partially in Māori. An additional 24.4% were formally taught Māori as an additional language, and 37.1% were taught Māori informally. However, very few students pass through the New Zealand education system without any Māori language education. For example, only 2.1% of students in Year 1 (aged 5) did not receive any Māori language education in 2023.

The use of the Māori language in the Māori diaspora is far lower than in New Zealand itself. Census data from Australia show it as the home language of 11,747, just 8.2% of the total Australian Māori population in 2016.

== Phonology ==
Māori has five phonemically distinct vowel articulations, and ten consonant phonemes.

=== Vowels ===
	Front	Central	Back
Close	i, iː	u, uː	
Mid	e, eː		o, oː
Open		a, aː	

Although it is commonly claimed that vowel realisations (pronunciations) in Māori show little variation, linguistic research has shown this not to be the case. (Note: Bauer mentions that Biggs 1961 announced a similar finding.)

Vowel length is phonemic, but four of the five long vowels occur in only a handful of word roots, the exception being /aː/. (Note: Bauer even raised the possibility of analysing Māori as really having six vowel phonemes, a, ā, e, i, o, u ([a, aː, ɛ, i, ɔ, ʉ]).) As noted above, it has recently become standard in Māori spelling to indicate a long vowel with a macron. For older speakers, long vowels tend to be more peripheral and short vowels more centralised, especially with the low vowel, which is long [aː] but short [ɐ]. For younger speakers, they are both [a]. For older speakers, /u/ is fronted only after /t/; elsewhere it is [u]. For younger speakers, it is fronted [ʉ] everywhere, as with the corresponding phoneme in New Zealand English. Due to the influence of New Zealand English, the vowel [e] is raised to be near [i], so that pī and kē (or piki and kete) now largely share the very same vowel space.

Beside monophthongs Māori has many diphthong vowel phonemes. Although any short vowel combinations are possible, researchers disagree on which combinations constitute diphthongs. Formant frequency analysis distinguish /aĭ/, /aĕ/, /aŏ/, /aŭ/, /oŭ/ as diphthongs. As in many other Polynesian languages, diphthongs in Māori vary only slightly from sequences of adjacent vowels, except that they belong to the same syllable, and all or nearly all sequences of nonidentical vowels are possible. All sequences of nonidentical short vowels occur and are phonemically distinct.

=== Consonants ===
The consonant phonemes of Māori are listed in the following table. Seven of the ten Māori consonant letters have the same pronunciation as they do in the International Phonetic Alphabet (IPA). For those that do not, the IPA phonetic transcription is included, enclosed in square brackets per IPA convention.

	Labial	Coronal	Velar	Glottal
Nasal	m	n	ng [ŋ]	
Plosive	p	t	k	
Continuant	wh [f, ɸ]	r [ɾ]	w	h

The pronunciation of ⟨wh⟩ is extremely variable, but its most common pronunciation (its canonical allophone) is the labiodental fricative, IPA [f] (as in the English word fill). Another allophone is the voiceless bilabial fricative, IPA [ɸ], which is usually supposed to be the sole pre-European pronunciation, although linguists are not sure of the truth of this supposition. At least until the 1930s, the bilabial fricative was considered to be the correct pronunciation. The fact that English ⟨f⟩ gets substituted by ⟨p⟩ and not ⟨wh⟩ in borrowings (for example, English February becomes Pēpuere instead of *Whēpuere) would strongly hint that the Māori did not perceive English /f/ to be the same sound as their ⟨wh⟩.

Because English stops /p, t, k/ primarily have aspiration, speakers of English often hear the Māori nonaspirated stops as English /b, d, ɡ/. However, younger Māori speakers tend to aspirate /p, t, k/ as in English. English speakers also tend to hear Māori /r/ as English /l/ in certain positions (cf. Japanese r).

/ŋ/ can come at the beginning of a word (like 'sing-along' without the "si"), which may be difficult for English speakers outside of New Zealand to manage. In some western areas of the North Island, ⟨h⟩ is pronounced as a glottal stop [ʔ] instead of [h], and the digraph ⟨wh⟩ is pronounced as [ʔw] instead of [f] or [ɸ]. /ɾ/ is typically a flap, and occasionally an approximant.

In borrowings from English, many consonants are substituted by the nearest available Māori consonant. For example, the English affricates /tʃ/ and /dʒ/, and the fricative /s/ are replaced by /h/ (/tʃ/ also sometimes as /ti/), /f/ becomes /p/, and /l/ becomes /ɾ/ (the /l/ is sometimes retained in the southern dialect, as noted below).

=== Syllables and phonotactics ===
Syllables in Māori have one of the following forms: V, VV, CV, CVV. This set of four can be summarised by the notation, (C)V(V), in which the segments in parentheses may or may not be present. A syllable cannot begin with two consonant sounds (the digraphs <ng> and <wh> represent single consonant sounds), and cannot end in a consonant, although some speakers may occasionally devoice a final vowel.

Loanwords formed into Māori end in open syllables, most often with the same vowel as the penultimate syllable. For example: basin /beɪsən/ is broken down into [beɪ.sən] > [be.ɪ.sə.n] > [pe.i.hə.nØ]; since the Māori vowel most closely approximating English /ə/ is /a/, the penultimate /sə/ becomes /ha/ and the last syllable is enunciated as /na/ thus peihana. All possible CV combinations are grammatical, though wo, who, wu, and whu occur only in a few loanwords from English such as wuru "wool" and whutupōro "football".

As in many other Polynesian languages, e.g., Hawaiian, the rendering of loanwords from English includes representing every English consonant of the loanword (using the native consonant inventory; English has 24 consonants to 10 for Māori) and breaking up consonant clusters. For example: "Presbyterian" has been borrowed as Perehipeteriana; no consonant position in the loanword has been deleted, but /s/ and /b/ have been replaced with /h/ and /p/, respectively.

Only one acquired couplet is prioritised whenever possible, based on perceived strength of consonants. "Treaty" is [tiriti], but tiriti also yields a homonym that means street with an emphasis on the stronger /t/ (as frequently with English loanwords that start with /st/); kāpene from captain follows a similar pattern following the stronger /p/. Medial nasal consonants like /ŋ/ succeeded by a final consonant are also reduced this way: the an in English bank /bæŋk/ for example is reduced to the approximant /e/ with another /e/ as the supporting vowel which merges to elongate as [peːke] hence pēke (or formerly written as ⟨peeke⟩).

Stress is typically within the last four vowels of a word, with long vowels and diphthongs counting double. That is, on the last four moras. However, stressed moras are longer than unstressed moras, so the word does not have the precision in Māori that it does in some other languages. It falls preferentially on the first long vowel, on the first diphthong if there is no long vowel (though for some speakers never a final diphthong), and on the first syllable otherwise. Compound words (such as names) may have a stressed syllable in each component word. In long sentences, the final syllable before a pause may have a stress in preference to the normal stressed syllable.

== Orthography ==
The modern Māori alphabet has 15 letters, two of which are digraphs (character pairs). The five vowels have both short and long forms, with the long forms denoted by macrons marked above them.

Māori letters
Consonants	Vowels	
Consonants	Short	Long
H h; K k; M m; N n; P p; R r; T t; W w; Ng ng; Wh wh	A a; E e; I i; O o; U u	Ā ā; Ē ē; Ī ī; Ō ō; Ū ū

The order of the alphabet is as follows: A, E, H, I, K, M, N, O, P, R, T, U, W, Ng, Wh.

This standard orthography may be tweaked to represent certain dialects of Māori:

- An underlined "ḵ" sometimes appears when writing the Southern dialect, to indicate that the /k/ in question corresponds to the ng of the standard language.
- Both L and G are also encountered in the Southern dialect, though not in standard Māori.
- Various methods are used to indicate glottal stops when writing the Whanganui dialect.

=== History ===
There was originally no native writing system for Māori. It has been suggested that the petroglyphs once used by the Māori developed into a script similar to the Rongorongo of Easter Island. However, there is no evidence that these petroglyphs ever evolved into a true system of writing. Some distinctive markings among the kōwhaiwhai (rafter paintings) of meeting houses were used as mnemonics in reciting whakapapa (genealogy) but again, there was no systematic relation between marks and meanings.

Attempts to write Māori words using the Latin script began with Captain James Cook and other early explorers, with varying degrees of success. Consonants seem to have caused the most difficulty, but medial and final vowels are often missing in early sources. Anne Salmond records aghee for aki (in the year 1773, from the North Island East Coast, p. 98), Toogee and E tanga roak for Tuki and Tangaroa (1793, Northland, p. 216), Kokramea, Kakramea for Kakaramea (1801, Hauraki, p. 261), toges for tokis, Wannugu for Uenuku and gumera for kumara (1801, Hauraki, pp. 261, 266 and 269), Weygate for Waikato (1801, Hauraki, p. 277), Bunga Bunga for pungapunga, tubua for tupua and gure for kurī (1801, Hauraki, p. 279), as well as Tabooha for Te Puhi (1823, Northern Northland, p. 385).

From 1814, missionaries tried to define the sounds of the language. Thomas Kendall published a book in 1815 entitled A korao no New Zealand, which in modern orthography and usage would be He Kōrero nō Aotearoa. Beginning in 1817, professor Samuel Lee of Cambridge University worked with the Ngāpuhi chief Tītore and his junior relative Tui (also known as Tuhi or Tupaea), and then with chief Hongi Hika and his junior relative Waikato; they established a definitive orthography based on Northern usage, published as the First Grammar and Vocabulary of the New Zealand Language (1820). The missionaries of the Church Missionary Society (CMS) did not have a high regard for this book. By 1830 the CMS missionaries had revised the orthography for writing the Māori language; for example, "Kiddeekiddee" was changed to the modern spelling, "Kerikeri".

The Māori embraced literacy enthusiastically, and missionaries reported in the 1820s that Māori all over the country taught each other to read and write, using sometimes quite innovative materials in the absence of paper, such as leaves and charcoal, and flax. Missionary James West Stack recorded the scarcity of slates and writing materials at the native schools and the use sometimes of "pieces of board on which sand was sprinkled, and the letters traced upon the sand with a pointed stick".

==== Long vowels ====
The alphabet devised at Cambridge University does not mark vowel length. The examples in the following table show that vowel length is phonemic in Māori.

ata	morning	āta	carefully
keke	cake	kēkē	armpit
mana	prestige	māna	for him/her
manu	bird	mānu	to float
tatari	to wait for	tātari	to filter or analyse
tui	to sew	tūī	type of bird
wahine	woman	wāhine	women

Māori devised ways to mark vowel length, sporadically at first. Occasional and inconsistent vowel-length markings occur in 19th-century manuscripts and newspapers written by Māori, including macron-like diacritics and doubling of letters. Māori writer Hare Hongi (Henry Stowell) used macrons in his Maori-English Tutor and Vade Mecum of 1911, as does Sir Āpirana Ngata (albeit inconsistently) in his Maori Grammar and Conversation (7th printing 1953). Once the Māori language was taught in universities in the 1960s, vowel-length marking was made systematic. Bruce Biggs, of Ngāti Maniapoto descent and professor at the University of Auckland, promoted the use of double vowels (e.g. waahine); this style was standard at the university until Biggs died in 2000.

Macrons (tohutō) are now the standard means of indicating long vowels, after becoming the favoured option of the Māori Language Commission—set up by the Māori Language Act 1987 to act as the authority for Māori spelling and orthography. Most news media now use macrons; Stuff websites and newspapers since 2017, TVNZ and NZME websites and newspapers since 2018.

Technical limitations in producing macronised vowels are sometimes resolved by using a diaeresis or circumflex instead of a macron (e.g., wähine or wâhine). In other cases, it is resolved by omitting the macron all together (e.g. wahine).

Double vowels continue to be used in a few exceptional cases, including:

- The Waikato-Tainui iwi preference is for using doubled vowels; hence in the Waikato region, double vowels are used by the Hamilton City Council, Waikato District Council and Waikato Museum.
- Inland Revenue continues to spell its Māori name Te Tari Taake instead of Te Tari Tāke, mainly to reduce the resemblance of tāke to the English word 'take'.
- A considerable number of governmental and non-governmental organisations continue to use the older spelling of ⟨roopu⟩ ('association') in their names rather than the more modern form ⟨rōpū⟩. Examples include Te Roopu Raranga Whatu o Aotearoa ('the national Māori weavers' collective') and Te Roopu Pounamu (a Māori-specific organisation within the Green Party of Aotearoa New Zealand).
- Double vowels are also used instead of macrons in long vowels resultant from compounding (e.g. Mātaatua) or reduplication.

== Grammar and syntax ==
Māori has mostly a verb-subject-object (VSO) word order. It is also analytical, featuring almost no inflection, and makes extensive use of grammatical particles to indicate grammatical categories of tense, mood, aspect, case, topicalisation, among others. The personal pronouns have a distinction in clusivity, singular, dual and plural numbers, and the genitive pronouns have different classes (a class, o class and neutral) according to whether the possession is alienable or the possessor has control of the relationship (a category), or the possession is inalienable or the possessor has no control over the relationship (o category), and a third neutral class that occurs only for singular pronouns and must be followed by a noun. There is also subject-object-verb (SOV) word order used in agent emphatic sentences. Examples of this include Nāku te ngohi i tunu ("I cooked the fish"; literally I the fish cooked) and Mā wai te haka e kaea? ("Who will lead the haka?"). Agent emphatic sentences can also take the subject-verb-object (SVO) word order. In this order the example sentences would be rendered as Nāku i tunu te ngohi and Mā wai e kaea te haka?

Māori noun and adjective phrases form by modifying those bases after, as is the norm of Austronesian languages e.g. whare nui "big house" where adjective nui modifies subject noun whare after cf. Malay: balai besar where modifier besar succeeds noun balai.

=== Bases ===
Biggs (1998) developed an analysis that the basic unit of Māori speech is the phrase rather than the word. The lexical word forms the "base" of the phrase. Biggs identifies five types of bases.

Noun bases include those bases that can take a definite article, but cannot occur as the nucleus of a verbal phrase; for example: ika (fish) or rākau (tree). Plurality is marked by various means, including the definite article (singular te, plural ngā), deictic particles tērā rākau (that tree), ērā rākau (those trees), possessives taku whare (my house), aku whare (my houses). A few nouns lengthen a vowel in the plural, such as wahine (woman); wāhine (women). In general, bases used as qualifiers follow the base they qualify, e.g. "matua wahine" (mother, female elder) from "matua" (parent, elder) "wahine" (woman).

Universal bases are verbs which can be used passively. When used passively, these verbs take a passive form. Biggs gives three examples of universals in their passive form: inumia (drunk), tangihia (wept for), and kīa (said).

Stative bases serve as bases usable as verbs but not available for passive use, such as ora, alive or tika, correct. Grammars generally refer to them as "stative verbs". When used in sentences, statives require different syntax than other verb-like bases.

Locative bases can follow the locative particle ki (to, towards) directly, such as runga, above, waho, outside, and placenames (ki Tamaki, to Auckland).

Personal bases take the personal article a after ki, such as names of people (ki a Hohepa, to Joseph), personified houses, personal pronouns, wai? who? and mea, so-and-so.

=== Particles ===
Like all other Polynesian languages, Māori has a rich array of particles, which include verbal particles, pronouns, locative particles, articles and possessives.

Verbal particles indicate aspectual, tense-related or modal properties of the verb which they relate to. They include:

- i (past)
- e (non-past)
- i te (past continuous)
- kei te (present continuous)
- kua (perfect)
- e ... ana (imperfect, continuous)
- ka (inceptive, future)
- kia (desiderative)
- me (prescriptive)
- kei (warning, "lest")
- ina or ana (punctative-conditional, "if and when")
- kāti (cessative)
- ai (habitual)

Locative particles (prepositions) refer to position in time and/or space, and include:

- ki (to, towards)
- kei (at)
- i (past position)
- hei (future position)

Possessives fall into one of two classes of prepositions marked by a and o, depending on the dominant versus subordinate relationship between possessor and possessed: ngā tamariki a te matua, the children of the parent but te matua o ngā tamariki, the parent of the children.

=== Determiners ===
==== Articles ====
	Singular	Plural
Definite	te	ngā
Indefinite^{1}	he	
Indefinite^{2}	tētahi	ētahi
Proper	a	

The definite articles are te (singular) and ngā (plural). Several other determiners termed definitives are related to the singular definite article te, such as the definitive possessive constructions with tā and tō and the demonstrative determiners.

The Māori definite articles are frequently used where the equivalent, the, is not used in English, such as when referring generically to an entire class. In these cases, the singular te can even be used with a morphologically plural noun, as in

te tamariki
DEF.SG child.PL
"children (in general)"

as opposed to

ngā tamariki
DEF.PL child.PL
"the (specific group of) children"

In other syntactic environments, the definite article may be used to introduce a noun-phrase which is pragmatically indefinite due to the restrictions on the use of he as discussed below.

The indefinite article he is used most frequently in the predicate and occasionally in the subject of the sentence, although it is not allowed in subject position in all sentence types. In the predicate, the indefinite article he can introduce either nouns or adjectives. The article either can be translated to the English 'a' or 'some', but the number will not be indicated by he. With nouns that show morphological number, he may be used either with singular or plural forms. The indefinite article he when used with mass nouns like water and sand will always mean 'some'.

he tāne	a man	some men
he kōtiro	a girl	some girls
he kāinga	a village	some villages
he āporo	an apple	some apples
he tangata	a person	–
he tāngata	–	some people

The indefinite article he is highly restricted in its use and is incompatible with a preceding preposition. For this reason, it cannot be used in the grammatical object of the sentence as these are marked prepositionally, either with i or ki. In many cases, speakers simply use the definite articles te and ngā in positions where he is disallowed, however the indefinite articles tētahi and ētahi may be used in these situations to emphasise the indefiniteness.

I kite ahau i te kurī.
PST see 1S ACC DEF.SG dog
"I saw the dog."
("I saw a dog.")

I kite ahau i tētahi kurī.
PST see 1S ACC INDEF.SG dog
"I saw a dog."

In positions where both he and tētahi/ētahi may occur, there are sometimes differences of meaning between them as the following examples indicate.

Kāore tētahi tangata i haere mai.
NEG SG.INDEF person.SG PST go towards.speaker
(1) "Someone didn't come." / "A particular person didn't come."
(2) "Nobody came."

Kāore he tangata i haere mai.
NEG INDEF person.SG PST go towards.speaker
"Nobody came."

The proper article a is used before personal and locative nouns acting as the subject of the sentence or before personal nouns and pronouns within prepositional phrases headed by prepositions ending in i (namely i, ki, kei and hei).

Kei hea a Pita?
PRES.LOC where ART Peter
"Where is Peter?"

Kei hea ia?
PRES.LOC where 3S
"Where is he?"

Kei {Tāmaki Makaurau} a Pita
PRES.LOC Auckland ART Peter
"Peter is in Auckland."

Kei {Tāmaki Makaurau} ia
PRES.LOC Auckland 3S
"He is in Auckland."

I kite ahau i a Pita
PST see 1S ACC ART Peter
"I saw Peter."

I kite ahau i a ia
PST see 1S ACC ART 3S
"I saw him."

The personal nouns are not accompanied by definite or indefinite articles unless they are an intrinsic part of the name, as in Te Rauparaha.

Kei hea a Te Rauparaha?
PRES.LOC where ART Te Rauparaha
"Where is Te Rauparaha?"

Kei t-ō-ku kāinga a Te Rauparaha.
PRES.LOC DEF.SG-INAL-1s home ART Te Rauparaha
"Te Rauparaha is at my home."

Proper nouns are not preceded by the proper article when they are neither acting as the subject of the sentence nor in a prepositional phrase headed by i, ki, kei or hei. For example, after the focusing particle ko, the proper article is not used.

Ko Rāwiri t-ō-ku ingoa.
FOC Rāwiri DEF.SG-INAL-1S name
"My name is Rāwiri."

Ko Te Rauparaha tērā tangata.
FOC Te Rauparaha DEM.SG.DIST person.SG
"That person (over there) is Te Rauparaha."

==== Demonstrative determiners and adverbs ====
Demonstratives occur after the noun and have a deictic function, and include tēnei, this (near me), tēnā, that (near you), tērā, that (far from us both), and taua, the aforementioned (anaphoric). These demonstratives, having a connection to the definite article te are termed definitives. Other definitives include tēhea? (which?), and tētahi, (a certain). The plural is formed just by dropping the t: tēnei (this), ēnei (these). The related adverbs are nei (here), nā (there, near you), rā (over there, near him).

Phrases introduced by demonstratives can also be expressed using the definite article te or ngā preceding a noun followed by one of the deictic particles nei, nā or rā. The t of the singular definite article appears in the singular demonstratives but is replaced by ∅ in the plural, having no connection with ngā in the majority of dialects.

te whare nei = tēnei whare
DEF.SG house PROX = DEM.SG.PROX house
"this house"

ngā whare nei = ēnei whare
DEF.PL house PROX = DEM.PL.PROX house
"these houses"

However, in dialects of the Waikato area, plural forms of demonstratives beginning with ng- are found, such as ngēnei 'these' instead of the more widespread ēnei (as well as and possessives such as ng(e)ōku 'my (plural, inalienable)' instead of ōku).

The following table shows the most common forms of demonstratives across dialects.

	Singular	Plural	Adverb
Proximal	tēnei	ēnei	nei
Medial	tēnā	ēnā	nā
Distal	tērā	ērā	rā
Aforementioned	taua	aua	

=== Pronouns ===
==== Personal pronouns ====
Pronouns have singular, dual and plural number. Different first-person forms in both the dual and the plural are used for groups inclusive or exclusive of the person(s) addressed.

Diagram of pronouns in Māori. Grammatical person: 1; 2; 3

		Singular	Dual	Plural
1st person	exclusive	au / ahau	māua	mātou
1st person	inclusive	au / ahau	tāua	tātou
2nd person		koe	kōrua	koutou
3rd person		ia	rāua	rātou

Like other Polynesian languages, Māori has three numbers for pronouns and possessives: singular, dual and plural. For example: ia (he/she), rāua (those two), rātou (they, three or more). Māori pronouns and possessives further distinguish exclusive "we" from inclusive "we", second and third. It has the plural pronouns: mātou (we, exc), tātou (we, inc), koutou (you), rātou (they). The language features the dual pronouns: māua (me and another), tāua (me and you), kōrua (you two), rāua (those two). The difference between exclusive and inclusive lies in the treatment of the person addressed. Mātou refers to the speaker and others but not the person or persons spoken to ("I and some others but not you"), and tātou refers to the speaker, the person or persons spoken to and everyone else ("you, I and others"):

- Tēnā koe: hello (to one person)
- Tēnā kōrua: hello (to two people)
- Tēnā koutou: hello (to more than two people)

==== Possessive pronouns ====
The possessive pronouns vary according to person, number, clusivity, and possessive class (a class or o class). Example: tāku pene (my pen), āku pene (my pens). For dual and plural subject pronouns, the possessive form is analytical, by just putting the possessive particle (tā/tō for singular objects or ā/ō for plural objects) before the personal pronouns, e.g. tā tātou karaihe (our class), tō rāua whare (their [dual] house); ā tātou karaihe (our classes). The neuter one must be followed by a noun and occur only for singular first, second and third persons. Taku is my, aku is my (plural, for many possessed items). The plural is made by deleting the initial [t].

Subject		Object					
Number	Person	Singular			Plural		
Number	Person	a class	o class	neutral	a class	o class	neutral
Singular	1	tāku	tōku	taku	āku	ōku	aku
Singular	2	tāu	tōu	tō	āu	ōu	ō
Singular	3	tāna	tōna	tana	āna	ōna	ana

==== Interrogative pronouns ====
- wai ('who')
- aha ('what')
- hea/whea ('where')
- nō hea ('whence')
- āhea ('when')
- e hia ('how many [things]')
- tokohia ('how many [people]')
- pēhea ('how')
- tēhea ('which'), ēhea ('which [pl.]')
- he aha ... ai ('why [reason]')
- nā te aha ... ai ('why [cause]')

=== Phrase grammar ===
A phrase spoken in Māori can be broken up into two parts: the "nucleus" or "head" and "periphery" (modifiers, determiners). The nucleus can be thought of as the meaning and is the centre of the phrase, whereas the periphery is where the grammatical meaning is conveyed and occurs before and/or after the nucleus.

Periphery	Nucleus	Periphery
te	whare	nei
ki te	whare	

The nucleus whare can be translated as "house", the periphery te is similar to an article "the" and the periphery nei indicates proximity to the speaker. The whole phrase, te whare nei, can then be translated as "this house".

==== Phrasal particles ====
A definite and declarative sentence (may be a copulative sentence) begins with the declarative particle ko. If the sentence is topicalised (agent topic, only in non-present sentences) the sentence begins with the particle nā (past tense) or the particle mā (future, imperfective) followed by the agent/subject. In these cases the word order changes to subject-verb-object or subject-object-verb. These are the agent emphatic sentences discussed earlier. The agent topicalising particles can contract with singular personal pronouns and vary according to the possessive classes: nāku can be thought of as meaning "as for me" and behave like an emphatic or dative pronoun.

Agent topic pronouns
	Past	Future
1S	nāku/nōku	māku/mōku
2S	nāu/nōu	māu/mō
3S	nāna/nōna	māna/mōna

==== Case particles ====
- Nominative: ko
- Accusative: i
- Dative/directional locative: ki
- Genitive: a/o

=== Negation ===
Forming negative phrases in Māori is quite grammatically complex. There are several different negators which are used under various specific circumstances. The main negators are as follows:

Negator	Description
kāo	Negative answer to a polar question.
kāore/kāhore/kāre	The most common verbal negator.
kore	A strong negator, equivalent to 'never'.
kaua e	Negative imperatives; prohibitive
ehara	Negation for copulative phrases, topicalised and equative phrases

Kīhai and tē are two negators which may be seen in specific dialects or older texts, but are not widely used. The most common negator is kāhore, which may occur in one of four forms, with the kāo form being used only in response to a question. Negative phrases, besides using kāore, also affect the form of verbal particles, as illustrated below.

Verbal particles
	Positive	Negative
Past	i	i
Future	ka	i/e
Present	kei te	i te
Imperfect	e...ana	
Past perfect	kua	kia

The general usage of kāhore can be seen in the following examples. The subject is usually raised in negative phrases, although this is not obligatory. Each example of a negative phrase is presented with its analogue positive phrase for comparison.

E haere ana tātou āpōpō
T/A move T/A 1PL.INCL tomorrow
'We are going tomorrow'

Kua tae mai he tāngata
T/A arrive hither a people
'Some people have arrived'

Kāhore tātou e haere ana āpōpō
NEG 1PL.INCL T/A move T/A tomorrow
'We are not going tomorrow'

Kāhore anō he tāngata kia tae mai
NEG yet a people SUBJ arrive hither
'Nobody has arrived yet'

=== Passive sentences ===
The passive voice of verbs is made by a suffix to the verb. For example, -ia (or just -a if the verb ends in [i]). The other passive suffixes, some of which are very rare, are: -hanga/-hia/-hina/-ina/-kia/-kina/-mia/-na/-nga/-ngia/-ria/-rina/-tia/-whia/-whina/. The use of the passive suffix -ia is given in this sentence: Kua hangaia te marae e ngā tohunga (The marae has been built by the experts). The active form of this sentence is rendered as: Kua hanga ngā tohunga i te marae (The experts have built the marae). It can be seen that the active sentence contains the object marker 'i', that is not present in the passive sentence, while the passive sentence has the agent marker 'e', which is not present in the active sentence.

=== Polar questions ===
Polar questions (yes/no questions) can be made by changing the intonation of the sentence. The answers may be āe (yes) or kāo (no).

=== Derivational morphology ===
Although Māori is mostly analytical there are several derivational affixes:

- -anga, -hanga, -ranga, -tanga (-ness, -ity) (the suffix depends on whether the verb takes, respectively, the -ia, -hia, -ria or -tia passive suffixes) (e.g. pōti 'vote', pōtitanga 'election')
- -nga (nominaliser)
- kai- (agentive noun) (e.g. mahi 'work', kaimahi 'worker/employee')
- ma- (adjectives)
- tua- (ordinal numerals) (e.g. tahi 'one', tuatahi 'first/primary')
- whaka- (causative prefix)

== Influence on New Zealand English ==
New Zealand English (NZE) has gained many loanwords from Māori; those most commonly used are proper nouns including place names, and words that refer to New Zealand plants and animals which frequently have no other English name. For example, the kiwi, the national bird, takes its name from te reo. Other words and phrases for which English alternatives do exist are also in common use; however, they are more likely to be used if they carry specific meanings with respect to Māori culture, such as kaumātua ("elder"), iwi ("tribe, nation"), and karakia ("prayer").

Kia ora (literally "be healthy") is a widely adopted greeting of Māori origin, with the intended meaning of "hello". It can also mean "thank you", or signify agreement with a speaker at a meeting. The Māori greetings tēnā koe (to one person), tēnā kōrua (to two people) or tēnā koutou (to three or more people) are also widely used, as are farewells such as haere rā. The Māori phrase kia kaha ("be strong") is frequently encountered as an indication of moral support for someone starting a stressful undertaking or otherwise in a difficult situation. Many other words such as whānau ("family") and kai ("food") are also widely understood and used by New Zealanders. The Māori phrase Ka kite anō ("until I see you again") is quite commonly used.

Māori speakers of NZE use Māori loanwords more often than non-Māori speakers, and Māori women more often than Māori men; no gender effect is observed among non-Māori NZE speakers. Māori NZE speakers use Māori loanwords more often when their audience is exclusively Māori than when they have non-Māori listeners.

Often the choice to use these words reflects an expression of social or political identity on the part of the speaker – as may also a choice not to use a Māori word when one exists. Although the use of Māori words in English correlates to some degree with the speaker's support for te reo, some non-Māori supporters choose not to use Māori words out of concern that such words do not "belong" to them. Younger NZE speakers are more likely than older speakers to use Māori words denoting non-material aspects of culture, such as tapu ("sacred or cursed"), kōrero ("speech"), or kaitiakitanga ("stewardship").

In 2023, 47 words or expressions from New Zealand English, mostly of Māori etymology, were added to the Oxford English Dictionary.

=== Pronunciation of Māori words in New Zealand English ===
The pronunciation of Māori loanwords (especially names) when speaking English, specifically the degree to which the words are assimilated to NZE phonology, is widely perceived in New Zealand as a social marker of the speaker's attitudes to the Māori language and people. One magazine columnist is quoted as saying

How a Pakeha chooses to pronounce "Māori" determines precisely where they fit on the PC scale. There are 11 possible variations, from "may-o-ree" at one end to Kim Hill's "mow-rri" at the other. The key is how broad you make your "a" and whether you roll your "r". Such small things, but they can make the difference between being taken for a Neanderthal bozo and getting on a polytech payroll.

In a 2018 interview, Māori actor-director Taika Waititi described New Zealand as "racist as fuck" primarily on the basis that "people just flat-out refuse to pronounce Māori names correctly". His comments aroused considerable backlash in the New Zealand media.

Among Māori people, the use of (non-assimilated) Māori pronunciations reflects the individual's degree of integration into the Māori community. Among non-Māori, supporters of te reo view Māori pronunciations as a marker of that support, but frequently do not use them out of concerns about getting them wrong or not being understood. Public service broadcaster Radio New Zealand's policy is to pronounce Māori words in English as they would be pronounced in Māori.

== Sample text ==
Article 1 of the Universal Declaration of Human Rights in Māori:

I te whānautanga mai o te tangata, kāhore ōna here, e ōrite ana tōna mana me ōna tika ki te katoa. Ka whakatōkia ki roto i te tangata he wairua, he hinengaro hoki, ā, me mahi tahi ia ki ngā tāngata o te ao i runga i te āhua o te tuakana me te teina.

Article 1 of the Universal Declaration of Human Rights in English:

All human beings are born free and equal in dignity and rights. They are endowed with reason and conscience and should act towards one another in a spirit of brotherhood.

== See also ==
- Māori Language Day
- Te Wiki o te Reo Māori (Māori Language Week)
