= Te Uruhina McGarvey =

- Born: Te Uruhina Tiakiwai; 27 September 1927; Ruatoki, New Zealand
- Died: 5 June 2015 (aged 87); Ruatoki, New Zealand
- Other names: Te Uru-Hina McGarvey
- Children: Turuhira Hare and others
- Awards: Sir Kingi Ihaka award (2009)
- Honours: Mataatua Kapa Haka Festival (life member)

Te Uruhina McGarvey-Tiakiwai (27 September 1927 – 5 June 2015) was a New Zealand Māori leader. A kuia of Ngāi Tūhoe and Te Arawa, she was also of English and Scottish descent.

A skilled kaikaranga, McGarvey advocated for education and the retention of Māori language and customs, and played an active role in tribal issues. During the 1940s she became an active member of the Te Wharekura o Ruatoki school. She mentored and tutored Māori cultural groups from around New Zealand and she was a judge at kapa haka competitions in New Zealand and Australia.

Born in 1927, McGarvey was a niece of soldier and community leader Henry Te Reiwhati Vercoe, and a first cousin of Whakahuihui Vercoe, who was the Archbishop of New Zealand from 2004 to 2006. The Māori educator Turuhira Hare is her daughter.

In 2009 McGarvey was a recipient of the Sir Kingi Ihaka award at the Creative New Zealand Te Waka Toi Awards in recognition for her "lifetime contribution to the development and retention of Māori arts and culture."

McGarvey had children, grandchildren, and great-grandchildren. She died on 5 June 2015, in Ruatoki. Her body was taken to Waikirikiri marae, where she lay in state for four days. Mourners at her tangi included former MP Tuku Morgan and the Māori king, Tūheitia Paki. Former Māori news presenter and actor Waihoroi Shortland attended the tangi and said that McGarvey was "the voice that guided Tūhoe in hard times."
