= Takurua Tamarau =

Takurua Tamarau MBE (1871–1958), also known as Takurua Mākarini, was a Māori tribal leader of the Tūhoe iwi, a leader in the Ringatū church, and farmer, of New Zealand.

Takurua was born at Kohimarama, near Ruatāhuna, Te Urewera, New Zealand, in about 1871. He was a son of Tamarau Waiari, also known as Te Mākarini Te Wharehuia, of Ngāti Koura and Ngāi Te Riu, and Roka of Ngāti Hinekura and Te Urewera. His father was a prominent leader of Tūhoe. Takurua was raised at Tātāhoata marae in the Ruatāhuna district, and the marae of Ōtenuku and Te Tōtara in Ruatoki. After his father died in about 1904, Takurua settled at permanently at Ruatoki, where he engaged in dairy farming.

Takurua was known as one of the last paramount chiefs of the Ngāi Tūhoe who was involved with negotiations between the Government and the tribe. He held numerous positions, within and on behalf of Tūhoe. He was chairman of the Ōtenuku marae committee, and was Chairperson of the Ruatoki school committee, now known as Board of Trustees, for more than 30 years. In 1935, Takurua was awarded the King George V Silver Jubilee Medal. He was appointed a Member of the Most Excellent Order of the British Empire (MBE) in 1953.

Some of Takurua's children held significant roles within Ngāi Tūhoe and New Zealand. His son George Takurua was a Lieutenant in the New Zealand army during World War II. With the request of Sir Apirana Ngata, a great friend of Takurua, urging Māori to be involved with the World War II defence force, George Takurua went to battle in Italy as a soldier of the 28th Māori Battalion. Lt. George Takurua died in battle in 1944.

Te Wharehuia Milroy was a grandson of Takurua.

== Death ==
Takurua Tamarau died at Ruatoki in 1958 at the age of 86 and lay in state on Ōtenuku Marae for six days before being buried on the Marae land. His funeral was attended by Iwi leaders throughout New Zealand, from politicians to written letters of condolences received by the family. Takurua’s grave was family sort to be unknown after the burial as high ranking chiefs graves are hidden for Rangatira purposes. However, as a consequence of his burial, the land was widely set aside as Te Tapuwae cemetery for the Whānau and Hapū of Ngāti Kōura. Takurua’s grave is known to be the first site of entrance into the Hapū cemetery facing the Marae guest entrance known as the Waharoa waiting to welcome people onto the Marae.
