= Te Hui Ahurei a Tuhoe =

- Genre: Iwi nation festival
- Founded: 1971
- Founder: John Rangihau
- Major events: Kapa haka, sports, debate
- Organizer: Tūhoe
- Website: https://www.ngaituhoe.iwi.nz/

Te Hui Ahurei a Tūhoe is a festival that was created in 1971 by John Rangihau for the Iwi nation Ngāi Tūhoe. Kapa haka teams that come from the Iwi nation perform and Tūhoe people gather to celebrate.

== History ==
The festival has been held in Ruatoki biannually since 1971, with its 50-year celebration in 2021 pushed back due to COVID-19. It was founded by John Rangihau. Te Hui Ahurei has a committee led in 2011 by Pou Temara and Turuhira Hare. Many people have played key roles in the festival over the years including Te Makariini Temara who died in 2017. Paora Kepa and Rameka Tuhaka are also people involved.

Te Hui Ahurei is the longest running iwi festival in Aotearoa. (Radio New Zealand 2023)

In 2003 and 2013 the festival was held at Ruatoki. In 2023 Waimana, Hawke's Bay hosted and Martin Rakuraku the chairperson of the organising committee.

== About ==
The purpose is to allow Tūhoe people who live outside the region to come home and celebrate together and to 'embody the concept of matemate-ā-one, the profound affection for one's land and people'. In 2023 there were 16 groups divided into junior and senior who presented over two days, and due to the 50 year celebration it was not a competition.

Te Hui Ahurei is the platform where Tūhoe can facilitate new ideas, embrace new challenges and cultivate traditional values as a people. (Te Mātāwai)

The programme of Te Hui Ahurei has kapa haka, sport and debate. Teams compete judged on acts that include waiata tira, whakaeke, wero, haka peruperu and karanga. Sports events include rugby and netball. In 2016 Ruatoki and Ruatahuna were in the rugby finals and Ruatoki was the winning team, and Te Hono a Te Kiore won the netball. One of the messages of the 2016 festival was the retention of the Tūhoe dialect.
