= Te Ngahuru =

Te Ngahuru (?–1823?) was a notable New Zealand Tūhoe leader and warrior. Of Māori descent, he identified with the Ngāi Tūhoe iwi. He was born at Te Purenga in Ruatoki, Bay of Plenty. He was raised in Ruatoki and Ruatāhuna and spent most of his life in Ruatoki. His descendants are called Ngāti Koura. Tamarau Waiari was a grandson of his.
