= Te Wharehuia Milroy =

Māori academic (1937–2019)

Te Wharehuia Milroy CNZM QSO
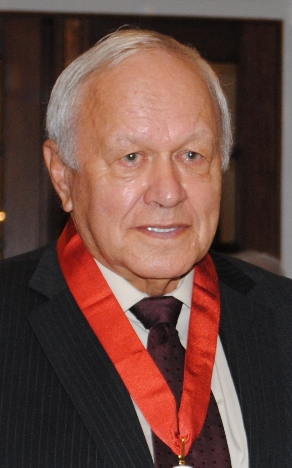
- Milroy in 2012
- Born: James Te Wharehuia Milroy; 24 July 1937
- Died: 7 May 2019 (aged 81)
- Spouse: Marion Rongomaianiwaniwa Fabling (died 2010)

Academic work
- Discipline: Māori language
- Institutions: University of Waikato; Te Panekiretanga o te Reo

James Te Wharehuia Milroy CNZM QSO (24 July 1937 – 7 May 2019) was a New Zealand academic and expert in the Māori language. He was of Ngāi Tūhoe descent. Together with Tīmoti Kāretu and Pou Temara, Milroy was a lecturer at Te Panekiretanga o te Reo (the Institute of Excellence in the Māori Language), which the three professors founded in 2004.

== Biography ==
Born on 24 July 1937, Milroy was the son of Kararaina Takurua and Frederick Milroy, and a grandson of the Tūhoe chief Takurua Tamarau. He was raised in Ruatoki and attended Rotorua Boys' High School. During the early 1990s, Milroy became a listed member of the Waitangi Tribunal. He worked and lectured at the University of Waikato in the Māori Department, alongside Tīmoti Kāretu.

In the 2003 Queen's Birthday Honours, Milroy was appointed a Companion of the Queen's Service Order for public services. In 2005, he was conferred with an honorary doctorate by the University of Waikato, and in 2009, he was a recipient of the Māori Creative New Zealand Te Waka Toi award. Milroy was appointed a Companion of the New Zealand Order of Merit, for services to Māori language, in the 2012 New Year Honours. He collaborated with Kāretu on the book He Kupu Tuku Iho, the first book published entirely in te reo Māori.

Milroy died on 7 May 2019, at the age of 81. He was predeceased by his wife, Marion Rongomaianiwaniwa Milroy (née Fabling), in 2010. She was a descendant of the Te Arawa and Ngāti Kahungunu tribes and a female speaker for the Te Panekiretanga Māori Language Institute. Milroy was buried beside his wife at Kauae Cemetery in Ngongotahā.
