= Te Wharekura o Ruatoki =

School in Bay of Plenty, New Zealand

Te Wharekura o Rūātoki

Location
- Mission Road, Ruatoki, New Zealand; 38.1474°S 177.0076°E

Information
- Type: State, co-educational, composite (Year 1–13)
- Motto: “Ko tā mātau kitenga anamata, Ko te Tiketike Tūhoetanga”
- Established: June 1896
- Ministry of Education Institution no.: 221
- Principal: (Deputy principal: Wallace Pene)
- Enrolment: 231 (July 2026)
- Hours in school day: 6.5 hours
- Colours: Black, maroon
- Socio-economic decile: 2D
- Website: http://www.ruatoki.school.nz/

Te Wharekura o Ruatoki is a rural school in the Māori settlement of Ruatoki in the Eastern Bay of Plenty region, New Zealand, serving children in years 1 through 13. It was established as Ruatoki Native School in 1896 after a visit by Richard Seddon and James Carroll. In 1978 it became New Zealand’s first officially bilingual school.

== Students and the school ==
The students are currently 99% Māori of the Ngāi Tūhoe iwi (tribe). It serves its community and other townships close by, with children transported to school by bus, van or car from Kawerau, Whakatane, Opotiki and Taneatua. School activities include kapa haka, manu kōrero and waka ama. Students and teachers are split into four house groups.

The school assembles at their gymnasium every first and last day of the school week to have karakia (church). The school abides by the church of Te Haahi Ringatu, which was established by Te Kooti Arikirangi.

The school and its educators follow their motto “Ko tā mātau kitenga anamata, Ko te tiketike Tūhoetanga” to encourage and urge themselves to strive for the highest and successful attributes education provides for all.

== History ==
Local Tuhoe leaders requested a school in 1891. The school opened as Ruatoki Native School on 4 June 1896 after a short visit to Ruatoki by politicians James Carroll and Richard Seddon in 1895. It became a district high school from 1946–47 until the secondary section closed in the 1970s. In 1978 it became New Zealand's first bilingual primary school. It then became a Māori language immersion school for children up to standard two, remaining bilingual for standards three and four. On 1 September 1992 it became an area school for children up to form seven and the first official kura kaupapa school.

Children from west of the nearby Whakatāne River attended the school in the early decades. As there was no bridge, they waded the river, and missed school when the river was in flood. Consequently, Tawera Native School opened on the other side of the river on 29 July 1931.

Oscar Holyoake, who was principal in 1948–1953, was the brother of Keith Holyoake, the deputy Prime Minister, and later Prime Minister, then Governor General.

Previous names

- Ruatoki Native School
- Ruatoki District School
- Ruatoki Bi-Lingual School
- Te Kura Kaupapa o Ruatoki
- Te Kura Maori a Rohe o Ruatoki

== Notable alumni ==
- Turuhira Hare – Māori composer
- Tame Iti – Māori activist
- Hirini Melbourne – Māori composer
