= Taranaki Jim =

New Zealand Māori warrior

- Hemi Te Waka
- Died: 7 May 1869; Manawahiwi Stream, Te Urewera, Hawke’s Bay, New Zealand
- Burial place: near Manawahiwi Stream
- Other names: Big Jim, Waikato Jim
- Military career
- Allegiance: British Empire
- Units: Friendly Native Contingent; attached to 57th (West Middlesex) Regiment of Foot; attached to 43rd (Monmouthshire) Regiment of Foot; Corps Of Guides
- Conflicts: First Taranaki War; Second Taranaki War; Tītokowaru's War; Te Kooti's War

Hemi Te Waka, better known as Taranaki Jim or Waikato Jim, was a Māori warrior who fought on both side of the New Zealand Wars during the 1860s. He served as a scout for British forces in Taranaki and Hawke’s Bay and subsequently served with George Stoddart Whitmore’s “Corps of Guides”, a group consisting of experienced trackers, scouts and soldiers who were tasked with finding Tītokowaru and later Te Kooti.

== Biography ==
Hemi Te Waka was of Te Āti Awa descent and took up arms against the crown during the First Taranaki War, fighting under chief Hapurona at Puketakauere. After the conflict, Hemi joined the government forces and acted as a scout as part of the Friendly Native Contingent. He was placed with the 57th Regiment and served with them before being transferred to the 43rd Regiment. It was while with the 43rd Jim was recognized for attempting to save the life of Captain Arthur Richard Close who was mortally wounded in a skirmish with rebel Māori on 28 July 1865. On 17 October 1865 Jim was robbed at Warea by local Māori, taking most of his personnel and valuable possessions including a revolver that had been gifted to him by the 57th for his actions at Te Ahuahu on 6 April 1864. In recognition of the affection that 43rd Regiment held for Jim, an inscribed revolver was gifted to him. In 1919, the gun and holster were donated to New Plymouth Museum.

In May 1869 Hemi Te Waka was shot twice through the chest while tracking naked footprints. Under the command of Captain Francis Gordon Swindley, the Guides, consisting of thirteen men, were ambushed by followers of Te Kooti at Manawahiwi Stream in Te Urewera(about halfway between the settlements of Minginui and Ruatāhuna) while the corps were in pursuit of Te Kooti and his followers. A skirmish then occurred before the Corps were joined by the remaining Armed Constabulary who were following more than half a mile behind. Te Kooti’s forces soon retreated into the bush and it was decided to not pursue due to it being late in the day. Jim suffered bullet wounds to his lungs and died over two hours later. He was buried near the scene of the skirmish after being sewed up into his blanket. To prevent Te Kooti’s followers from returning and digging up Jim’s body, a cooking fire was placed over his grave to mask it. Accounts state that the current dirt road beside the Manawahiwi Stream runs across Jim’s grave. In the 1920s a memorial to men who were killed and buried at Orangikawa was erected as well as a memorial to Jim and another Māori member of the government forces.
