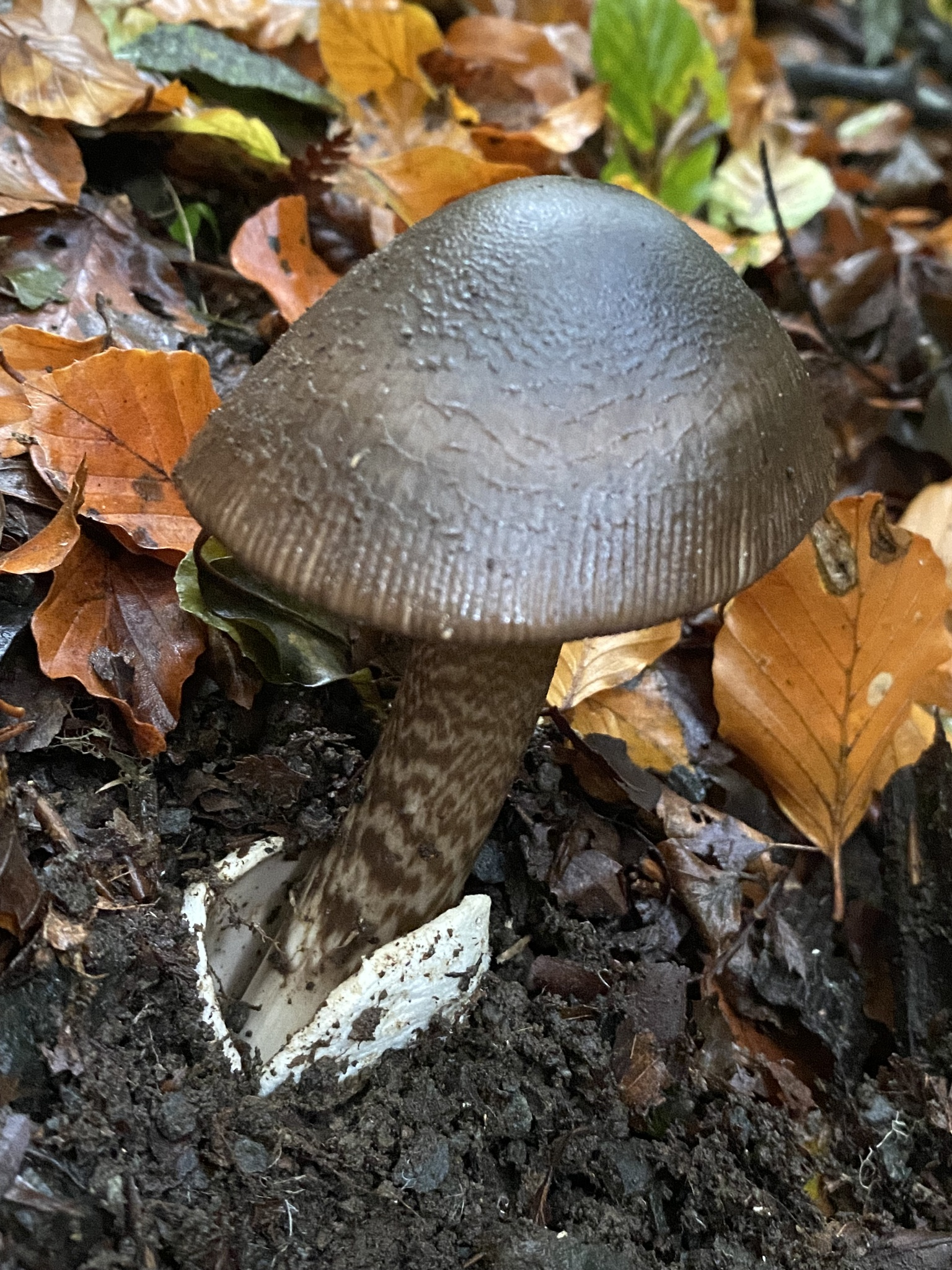
- Amanita pekeoides in Chingford Park, Dunedin, New Zealand

Scientific classification
- Domain: Eukaryota
- Kingdom: Fungi
- Division: Basidiomycota
- Class: Agaricomycetes
- Order: Agaricales
- Family: Amanitaceae
- Genus: Amanita
- Species: A. pekeoides

Binomial name
- Amanita pekeoides G.S.Ridl. (1991)

= Amanita pekeoides =

Species of fungus from New Zealand

Amanita pekeoides is a species of fungus in the family Amanitaceae. It is endemic to New Zealand.

== Taxonomy ==
The species was first described scientifically by New Zealand mycologist Geoff Ridley in 1991.

The holotype specimen was collected at Paua Ridge, Orongorongo Valley, Rimutaka Forest Park, Wellington, New Zealand.

The specific epithet pekeoides derives from the Māori word peke meaning sack or bag, in reference to the saccate volva from which the fruiting body emerges.

== Description ==
Ridley described Amanita pekeoides as a “typical member of the Vaginatae” due to the “non-bulbous stipe, saccate volva, and inamyloid basidiospores”.

The pileus of A. pekeoides is described as being between 32–82 millimetres (1 1/2–3 inches) and convex in shape when immature, gradually becoming plano-convex then plano-depressed as the fruiting body matures. The margin of the pileus is sulcate, with the grooves being greyish sepia while the disc and ridges are hazel to dark greyish sepia, paling at the margin. The pileus is viscid when wet but dries quickly. The lamellae are crowded but free; usually 6–10 mm wide, pale buff to buff with a complete margin that is brown vinaceous to dark grey sepia, and truncated lamellulae. The stipe is typically 7–12 centimetres (3–4 1/2 in) high, 7–10 mm in diameter, hollow, tapering apically, and the surface is white to pale greyish sepia, with hazel to greyish sepia striate bands, which become finer and more numerous towards the apex. A notable distinction of A. pekeoides from many other Amanita species is its lack of annulus. A. pekeoides exhibits a whitish to pale sepia or pale brown vinaceous, 30–58 mm volva which is often hidden under substrate. The volva starts out fleshy but becomes membranous with age, is saccate and usually bilabiate.

Some Amanita pekeoides found only in the Nelson region of the South Island and Te Urewera National park in the North Island have a distinctly friable volva which leaves remnants on the pileus and stipe. It is yet to be determined whether this characteristic represents a different population entirely or simply indicates a lack of collection from other areas. There are also some individuals which appear to be more whitish in colour but are otherwise identical to other Amanita pekeoides.

== Distribution and habitat ==
A. pekeoides occurs in the North and South Islands of New Zealand, and is primarily associated with Nothofagus species.

== See also ==
- List of Amanita species
