= Turuhira Hare =

New Zealand musician (born c. 1957)

- Born: c. 1957 (age 68–69)
- Occupation: Māori academic
- Family: Te Uruhina McGarey (mother) Whakahuihui Vercoe (uncle) Henry Te Reiwhati Vercoe (grand-uncle)

Turuhira Hare (born c. 1957) is a Māori academic of performing arts, composition and education. She is of Tūhoe, Te Arawa and English and Scottish descent and is a daughter of the late renowned Tūhoe kaumātua, Te Uruhina McGarvey. She is a leading figure in her community and is renowned for her contribution to the arts of kapa haka and education.

== History ==
Immersed in the field of tikanga Māori and performing arts, Turuhira was fed through the ranks of the Ruatoki Māori Cultural Group established in the late 1940s to the early 1950s. She became head of the cultural group following the death of the former head and great kaumātua, Tikina Heremia. She was bestowed with this position, and to this day has retained it since the late 1970s. Turuhira continues to contribute her knowledge and dedicate her life and time to Māori performing arts and education.

Turuhira is a former principal and deputy principal of Te Wharekura o Ruatoki school. In the mid-1980s she worked with former Ruatoki school principal Tawhirimatea Williams and Māori educator Kaa Williams. They together revitalised the Māori language in the school which later became the first bilingual school in New Zealand.

Turuhira has also held numerous leading positions in the field of kapa haka. This includes judging at Te Hui Ahurei ā Tūhoe and been head judge of the Rangitaiki primary kapa haka competition. She is also head judge of the Primary and Secondary National Kapa Haka competition. She has also judged at Te Matatini for over a decade and continues to do so.

On many kapa haka occasions, she has won the title of best female leader at the Tūhoe Ahurei and senior Mataatua kapa haka festivals. She is the only leader to take the title more than three consecutive competitions. In February 2009, she won the Te Matatini title for best female leader and later decided to retire from the stage – from having performed for 39 years. She continues to contribute her knowledge to the Ruatoki cultural group and now remains a mentor. In an interview with Movie Producer Vincent Ward, Turuhira appeared in the 2008 documentary Rain of the Children.

== Personal life ==
Turuhira resides in the Whakatāne region and is a wife, mother and grandmother and dedicates her life to her family.
