= Tauranga River =

- Route of the Tauranga River
- Mouth of the Tauranga River Tauranga River (North Island)

Location
- Country: New Zealand

Physical characteristics
- Source
  - location: Huiarau Range
  - coordinates: 38°34′08″S 177°09′12″E
- Mouth
  - location: Whakatāne River
  - coordinates: 38°04′07″S 176°59′55″E
- Length: 84 km (52 mi)

Basin features
- Progression: Tauranga River → Whakatāne River → Bay of Plenty → Pacific Ocean
- Tributaries
  - left: Moeawhetu Stream, Tawhana Stream, Pakoakoa Stream, Heikaretu Stream, Onainai Stream, Wharetoa Stream, Waitawa Stream, Te Awaateuora Stream, Ihukopiti Stream, Te Terata Stream, Wharerimu Stream, Ongaonga Stream, Oruamananui Stream, Oturiamana Stream, Umutaoroa Stream, Opunua Stream, Whanganui Stream, Matatere Stream, Raroa Stream, Waiwherowhero Stream
  - right: Uruwaea Stream, Otane Stream, Te Umukuri Stream, Paeatotara Stream, Orouahineuru Stream, Otapukawa Stream, Pokerekere Stream, Omutu Stream, Ngutuoha Stream, Te Awaateatua Stream, Pohatuatua Stream, Urewera Stream, Waiiti Stream, Tapataua Stream, Okehu Stream, Te Rere Stream, Ōtara Stream, Tieke Stream, Huape Stream, Parau Stream, Waiopua Stream, Tarepe Stream

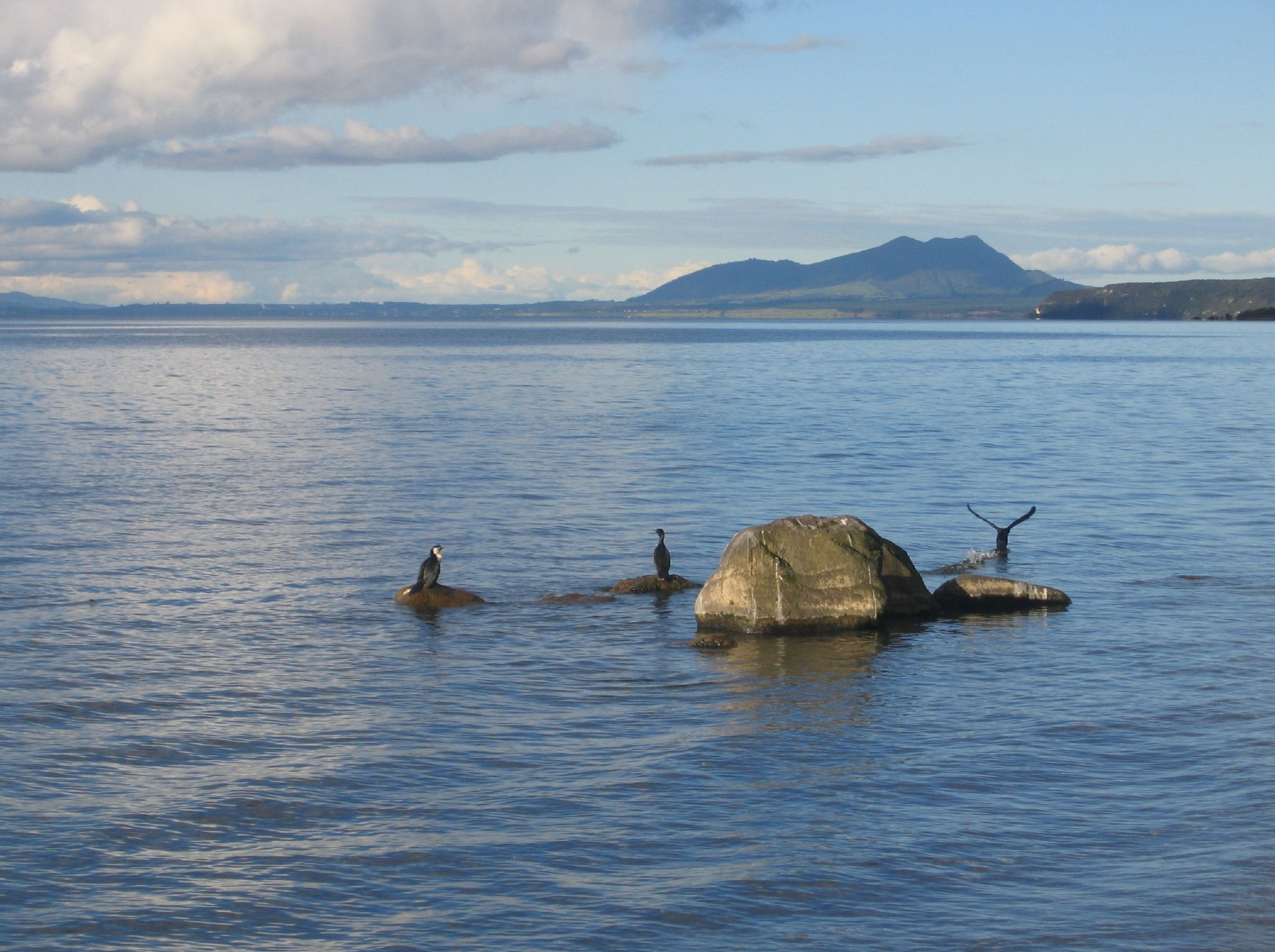
Lake Taupo, largest lake by surface area in New Zealand, drained by the Waikato River, while its main tributaries are the Waitahanui River, the Tongariro River, and the Taupo-Tauranga River.

The Tauranga River is a river of the Bay of Plenty Region of New Zealand's North Island. It flows generally north from its sources in Te Urewera, past the settlement of Waimana, to join the Whakatāne River just to the south-west of the town of Tāneatua. The lower section from the confluence of the Waiti Stream near Tahora down to the Whakatane River was also previously known by the unofficial name Waimana River – only the higher section was called Tauranga River.

== See also ==
- List of rivers of New Zealand
