= John Rangihau =

New Zealand academic and Māori leader

John Te Rangianiwaniwa Rangihau BEM (5 September 1919 – 14 October 1987) was a New Zealand academic and Māori leader of the Ngāi Tūhoe iwi. He was also called Te Nika and Te Rangihau.

Rangihau was born at Kuha near Waikaremoana. He received his education at Kokako Native School and at Wesley College in Auckland. He fought with the 28th New Zealand (Māori) Battalion in World War II. He worked as a Māori welfare officer for the Department of Maori Affairs and became a recognised leader of the Tuhoe people. From 1957 to 1959, Rangihau completed a diploma in social science at Victoria University.

In 1971 Rangihau founded the Te Hui Ahurei a Tūhoe festival, which is the longest running Iwi national festival.

In 1973, Rangihau was working for the University of Waikato's Centre for Maori Studies and Research looking for ways to preserve the Māori language. He was involved in setting up Māori-language pre-school groups in 1974, but they lasted less than a year. In the 1975 New Year Honours, he was awarded the British Empire Medal for services to the Māori people. Rangihau became involved in the ministerial committee to prevent the decline in the number of Māori language speakers in New Zealand, and the scheme came to fruition with the kōhanga reo scheme of Māori-language kindergartens in 1982.

After 1982, Rangihau became an advisor to the Maori Affairs Department. He encouraged Māori elders to contact their children and grandchildren in prisons and encourage them to return to their families once released. He facilitated research into Māori health.

Victoria University established a teaching and research position in his honour in 1989.
