= List of Māori composers =

This is a list of notable Māori composers.

- Wiremu Nia Nia Totara Tree
- Karl Teariki
- Whirimako Black
- Dean Hapeta
- Turuhira Hare
- Fanny Rose Howie "Princess Te Rangi Pai", of Hine E Hine fame
- Kingi Matutaera Ihaka
- Maewa Kaihau
- Derek Lardelli
- Dr Hirini Melbourne
- Hinewehi Mohi
- Tuini Moetu Haangu Ngawai
- Tuta Nihoniho
- Ngoi Pewhairangi
- Kohine Ponika
- Richard Puanaki
- Rua Kenana
- Ruia Aperahama
- Hohepa Tamehana
- Prince Tui Teka
- Te Kooti Arikirangi
- Inia Te Wiata
- Mahinaarangi Tocker
- Ngapo Wehi
- Pimia Wehi
- Dame Gillian Whitehead
