= Tīpapa Marae =

Tīpapa marae may refer to:

- Tīpapa marae at Murupara, New Zealand
- Kākānui (Tīpapa) marae at Ruatāhuna, New Zealand
