= Hikawera Te Kurapa =

Hikawera Te Kurapa (1907–1985) was a notable New Zealand tribal tohunga, horse-breaker, farmer and ringatū leader. Of Māori descent, he identified with the Tūhoe iwi. He was born in Ruatoki, Bay of Plenty, New Zealand in 1907.
