= Tamarau Waiari =

New Zealand tribal leader and tohunga

Tamarau Waiari (1835–1904), also known as Te Mākarini Te Wharehuia and Te Mākarini Kaikino, was a notable New Zealand tribal leader and tohunga. Of Māori descent, he identified with the Tūhoe iwi. He was the son of Waiari and the grandson of Te Ngahuru. He was born in the Thames district in 1835, when his family was visiting there. He was the father of Takurua Tamarau.
