= Kōhine Pōnika =

New Zealand composer (1920–1990)

- Born: Kōhine Tewhakarua Rangi; 28 June 1920; Ruatoki, New Zealand
- Died: 25 November 1989 (aged 69)
- Occupation: Composer of Māori waiata
- Spouse: Koti Hohia Pōnika (m. 1940; died 1984)
- Children: 7

Kōhine Tewhakarua Pōnika (née Rangi; 28 June 1920 – 25 November 1989) was a New Zealand composer known for her Māori waiata (songs).

== Early life and family ==
Pōnika was born in Ruatoki on 28 June 1920, where she attended Ruatoki Native School and Hukarere Girls' College. Her father was a clergyman and she was one of eight children, descended from Ngāti Porou on her father's side and Tūhoe on her mother's side. She has said she loved singing from an early age.

She married Koti Hohia Pōnika on 24 May 1940, and they adopted seven children together. In 1967 the family moved to Tūrangi due to her husband's work on the Tongariro Power Scheme, where she lived for the rest of her life. In 1969 she founded the Hei Tiki Māori Youth Club in Tūrangi in 1969.

== Career ==
Pōnika wrote waiata (songs) in both te reo Māori (the Māori language) and English. She could not read sheet music.

Popular waiata (songs) composed by Pōnika include "Aku Mahi", "Kua Rongorongo" and "E Rona E". Her song "Tōia Mai Rā" won a national New Zealand Broadcasting Corporation (NZBC) award in 1966 for best action song. In 1969 she won an award for original Māori Songs and Lyrics in the NZBC Cook Bi-Centenary Celebration Competition. In the 1980s she travelled to the United States as a tutor with the exhibition Te Maori.

== Death and legacy ==
Pōnika died on 25 November 1989. She had been predeceased by her husband in 1984.

In 2009, her whānau (family) launched a ten-track CD of her waiata, titled Ka Haku Au – A Poet's Lament. It inspired a documentary of the same name about her life and career featuring members of her whānau, directed by Ngahuia Wade. The documentary was aired on Māori Television and won Best Māori Language Show at the 2009 Qantas Film and Television Awards.
