= Te Urewera =

Area in the North Island of New Zealand

Te Urewera Te Urewera
- Highlands
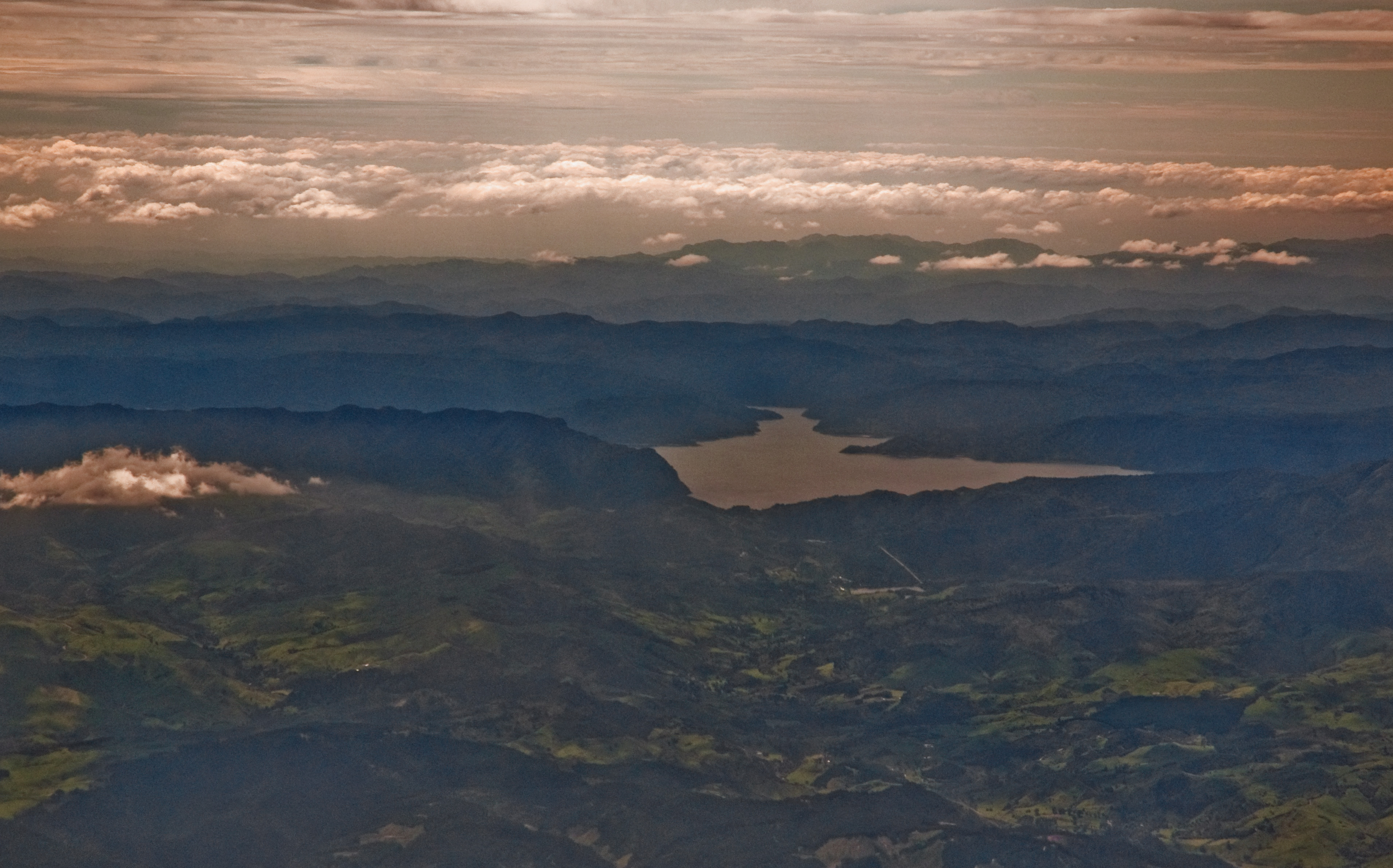
- Lake Waikaremoana in Te Urewera
- Interactive map of Te Urewera
- Coordinates: 38°27′S 177°03′E
- Location: Bay of Plenty Region, Hawke's Bay, Gisborne District
- Range: Ikawhenua Range, Huiarau Range

Te Urewera is an area of mostly forested, sparsely populated rugged hill country in the North Island of New Zealand, located inland between the Bay of Plenty and Hawke Bay. Te Urewera is the rohe (historical home) of Tūhoe, a Māori iwi (tribe) known for its stance on Māori sovereignty.

In 1954, a large area of Te Urewera was designated Te Urewera National Park by the New Zealand Government. In 2014 after a Waitangi Tribunal settlement with Tūhoe, the national park was disestablished and the former area was given environmental personhood. This area is now managed by Te Urewera Board, a body composed of both members who represent Tūhoe and the New Zealand Government.

Outside of the protected area, Te Urewera includes land administered as Whirinaki Te Pua-a-Tāne Conservation Park, Onekawa Te Mawhai Regional Park, customary private land owned by Tūhoe, the settlements of Ruatoki North, Waimana, Tāneatua, and privately owned land.

== Geography ==
The extent of Te Urewera is not formally defined, but is shown by Te Urewera Board as extending from the shores of the Ōhiwa Harbour of the Bay of Plenty to south of Lake Waikaremoana, and includes the Huiarau Range and Ikawhenua Range. According to An Encyclopaedia of New Zealand (1966), "The Urewera Country originally included all lands east of the Rangitaiki River and west of a line along the lower Waimana River and the upper reaches of the Waioeka River. Its southern boundary was marked by Maungataniwha Mountain, the Waiau River, and Lake Waikaremoana." Much of it is mountainous country, covered with native forest, and it includes the Huiarau, Ikawhenua, and Maungapōhatu ranges. There are a few flat mountain valleys, chiefly the Ahikereru valley, where the settlements of Minginui and Te Whāiti are, and the Ruatāhuna valley. In the north, towards Whakatāne and the coast, are lowland areas, where the settlements of Tāneatua, Ruatoki and Waimana are located. Lake Waikaremoana and Lake Waikareiti are in the south-eastern part.

Most of Te Urewera is in the eastern Bay of Plenty Region and northern Hawke's Bay Region, with a small part in the Gisborne District. All the settlements are outside the protected area. The region is isolated, with State Highway 38 being the only major arterial road crossing it, running from Waiotapu near Rotorua via Murupara to Wairoa.

== History ==
The name Te Urewera is a Māori phrase meaning "The Burnt Penis" (compare Māori: ure, lit. 'penis'; Māori: wera, lit. 'burnt').

Because of its isolation and dense forest, Te Urewera remained largely untouched by British colonists until the early 20th century; in the 1880s it was still in effect under Māori control. Te Kooti, a Māori leader, found refuge from his pursuers among Tūhoe, with whom he formed an alliance. As with the King Country at the time, few Pākehā risked entering Te Urewera.

Between 1894 and 1912, with the approval of a Crown statute, the Urewera District Native Reserve Act 1896, leaders of Tūhoe were able to establish a traditional sanctuary known as the Urewera District Native Reserve, which had virtual home rule. However, between 1915 and 1926 the Crown mounted what has been called "a predatory purchase campaign", the Urewera Consolidation Scheme, which took some 70 percent of the reserve and relocated the Tūhoe to more than 200 small blocks of land scattered throughout what in 1954 became the Urewera National Park.

In the early 20th century Rua Kēnana Hepetipa formed a religious community at Maungapōhatu.

In 1999, the Waitangi Tribunal published a 520-page working paper which analysed the history of the region and concluded that the Crown had never intended to allow Tūhoe self-government. Between 2003 and 2005, a panel of the Waitangi Tribunal consisting of Judge Pat Savage, Joanne Morris, Tuahine Northover, and Ann Parsonson heard evidence on land claims in Te Urewera and designated an area which it called the Te Urewera inquiry district. Part One of its report, covering the period up to 1872, was published in July 2009 and found that the Crown had treated Tūhoe unfairly, especially with regard to the confiscation of a large area of land in the Eastern Bay of Plenty in 1866.

== Status of the protected area ==
In 1954 much of Te Urewera was designated as the Te Urewera National Park, but that was disestablished in 2014, to be replaced by a new legal entity simply called Te Urewera.

A land settlement was signed in June 2013 after being ratified by all Tūhoe members. Under this, Tūhoe received financial, commercial and cultural redress valued at approximately $170 million; a historical account and Crown apology; and the co-governance of Te Urewera, put into law by enacting the Tūhoe Claims Settlement Act 2014.

The protected area is now administered by the Te Urewera Board, which comprises joint Tūhoe and Crown membership. Te Urewera has legal personhood, and owns itself, having in 2014 become the first natural resource in the world to be awarded the same legal rights as a person.

The new entity continues to meet the International Union for Conservation of Nature criteria for a Category II National Park.

As of 2022, the members of the Te Urewera Board are Jim Bolger of Te Kūiti, a former prime minister of New Zealand, Maynard Manuka Apiata of Rūātoki, Lance Winitana of Waikaremoana, Marewa Titoko of Waimana, Te Tokawhakāea Tēmara of Rotorua, Tāmati Kruger of Tāneatua, Dave Bamford, a sustainable tourism consultant, John Wood, previously a chief Crown negotiator, and Jo Breese, a former chief executive of World Wildlife Fund New Zealand.

== Flora and fauna ==
The crown fern (Blechnum discolor) is a widespread understory plant.

== See also ==
- Environmental personhood
- Protected areas of New Zealand
