= Waikare River (Bay of Plenty) =

River in New Zealand

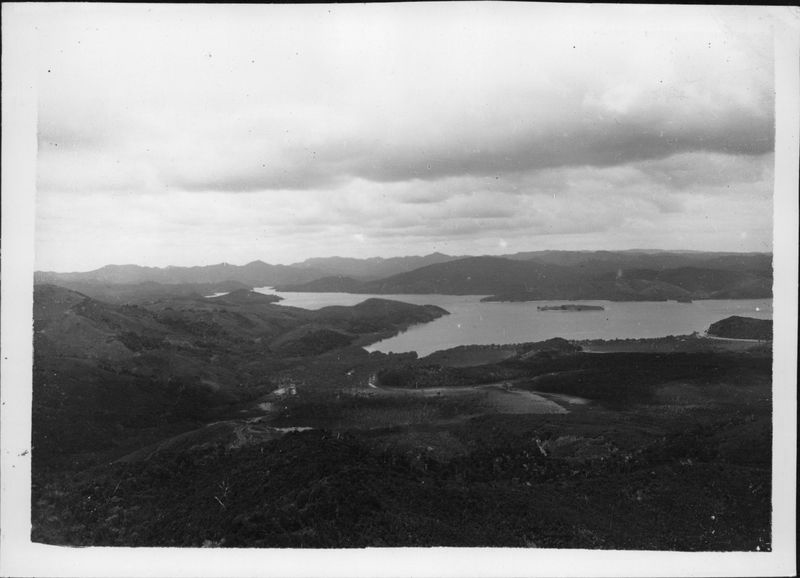
- Route of the Waikare River
- Mouth of the Waikare River Waikare River (Bay of Plenty) (North Island)

Location
- Country: New Zealand

Physical characteristics
- Source: Confluence of the Whakau Stream and Waipaepae Stream
  - coordinates: 38°32′13″S 177°05′29″E
  - elevation: 720 m (2,360 ft)
- Mouth
  - location: Whakatāne River
  - coordinates: 38°23′56″S 177°00′10″E
  - elevation: 115 m (377 ft)
- Length: 25 km (16 mi)

Basin features
- Progression: Waikare River → Whakatāne River → Bay of Plenty → Pacific Ocean
- Tributaries
  - left: Hapenui Stream, Kopu Stream, Hatinoa Stream, Neketuri Stream, Motuhouhi Stream, Otanetea Stream, Okirara Stream, Tauwhare Stream, Kiekie Stream, Otaura Stream, Ōhau Stream, Manahautoa Stream, Owhakatau Stream
  - right: Manakino Stream, Hanehane Stream, Maukuroa Stream, Opamako Stream, Waipawa Stream, Kurakura Stream, Kukau Stream, Hinaukura Stream, Wheturau Stream, Korouanui Stream, Toromiro Stream, Otira Stream, Otapupia Stream

The Waikare River is a river in the Bay of Plenty Region of New Zealand' North Island. It flows north from its origins between the peaks of Matawhio and Papakai north of Lake Waikaremoana to reach the Whakatāne River 25 kilometres (16 mi) east of Murupara.

== See also ==
- List of rivers of New Zealand
