= Tāneatua =

Rural settlement in Bay of Plenty Region, New Zealand

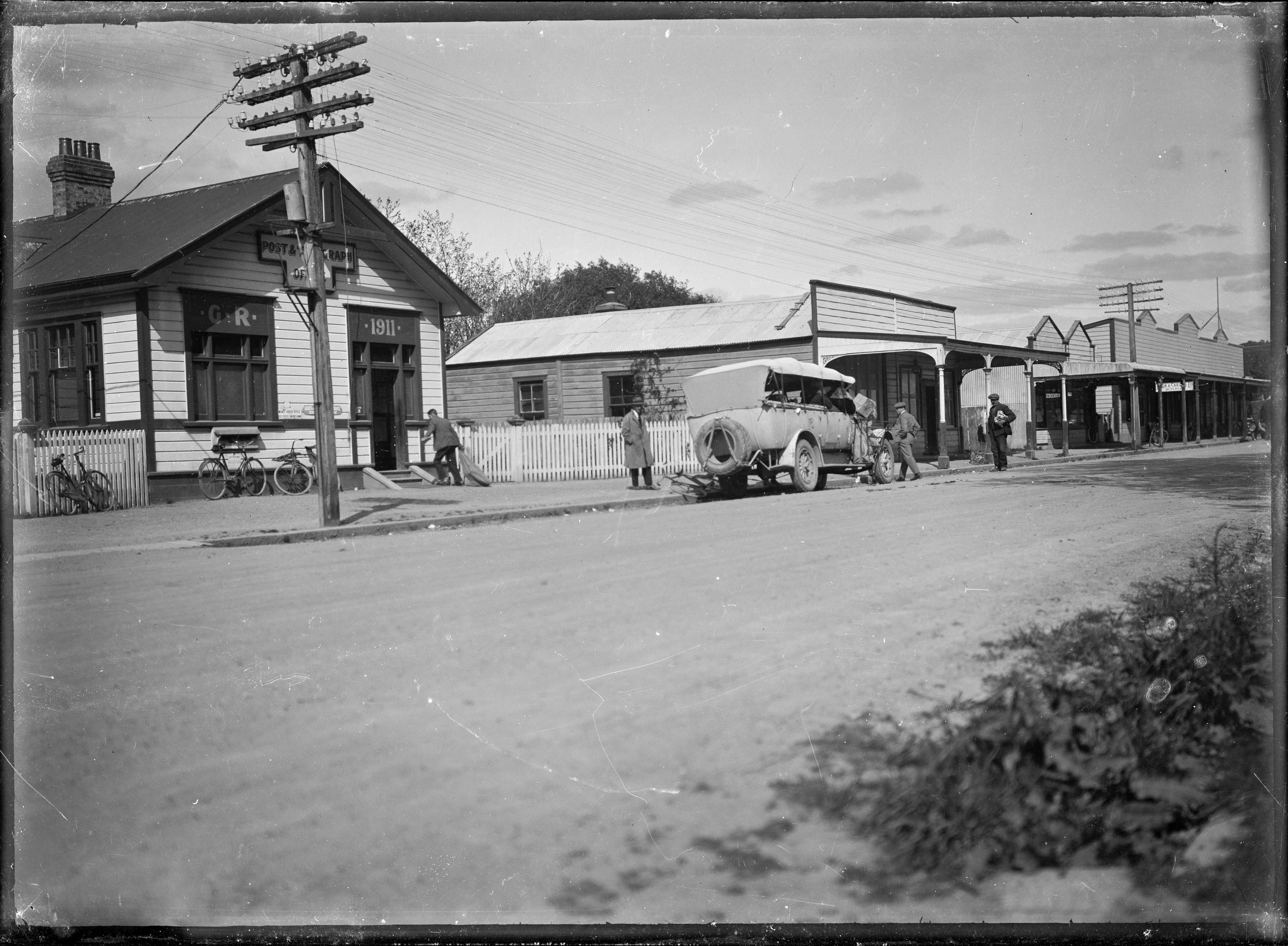
- Main street of Tāneatua, c. 1920
- Interactive map of Tāneatua
- Coordinates: 38°03′50″S 177°00′25″E
- Country: New Zealand
- Region: Bay of Plenty
- Territorial authority: Whakatāne District
- Ward: Te Urewera General Ward
- Community: Tāneatua Community
- Electorates: East Cape; Waiariki (Māori)

Government
  - Territorial authority: Whakatāne District Council
  - Regional council: Bay of Plenty Regional Council
  - Mayor of Whakatāne: Nándor Tánczos
  - East Cape MP: Dana Kirkpatrick
  - Waiariki MP: Rawiri Waititi

Area
  - Total: 0.69 km^{2} (0.27 sq mi)

Population (June 2025)
  - Total: 940
  - Density: 1,400/km^{2} (3,500/sq mi)

Tāneatua is a small town in the Bay of Plenty region of New Zealand's North Island, 13 kilometres south of Whakatāne. State Highway 2 passes through the town on its route between Edgecumbe and Ōpōtiki. The small settlements of Ruatoki and Waimana are to the south and south-east of Tāneatua.

The Whakatāne River runs to the west of Tāneatua, while the Tauranga River (also formerly called the Waimana River) flows south of the township and joins the Whakatāne River just to the southwest of Tāneatua.

Te Kura Whare, the headquarters of the Ngāi Tūhoe tribe's representative body, Te Uru Taumatua, is on the highway at the north-western end of Tāneatua. It includes a library, gallery, archive and large tribal meeting chamber.

== History ==
The land was subdivided by the government in the 1880s, and the town laid out in 1896. It was initially called Ōpouriao North and renamed Taneatua in 1920.

The now closed Tāneatua Branch railway line terminated in Tāneatua in 1928. Earlier considered part of the East Coast Main Trunk Railway, it became a branch line off the main line from Hawkens Junction, northwest of Edgecumbe. The Tāneatua railway station has been demolished.

== Demographics ==
Tāneatua is described by Statistics New Zealand as a rural settlement, and covers 0.69 km^{2} (0.27 sq mi). It had an estimated population of 940 as of June 2025, with a population density of 1,362 people per km^{2}. Tāneatua is part of the larger Wainui statistical area.

Historical population for Tāneatua
Year	Pop.	±% p.a.
2006	792	—
2013	786	−0.11%
2018	903	+2.81%
2023	858	−1.02%

Tāneatua had a population of 858 in the 2023 New Zealand census, a decrease of 45 people (−5.0%) since the 2018 census, and an increase of 72 people (9.2%) since the 2013 census. There were 405 males and 453 females in 216 dwellings. 1.4% of people identified as LGBTIQ+. The median age was 29.7 years (compared with 38.1 years nationally). There were 246 people (28.7%) aged under 15 years, 189 (22.0%) aged 15 to 29, 339 (39.5%) aged 30 to 64, and 84 (9.8%) aged 65 or older.

People could identify as more than one ethnicity. The results were 19.2% European (Pākehā), 92.3% Māori, 6.6% Pasifika, 0.7% Asian, and 0.7% other, which includes people giving their ethnicity as "New Zealander". English was spoken by 93.4%, Māori by 45.8%, and other languages by 1.4%. No language could be spoken by 2.4% (e.g. too young to talk). New Zealand Sign Language was known by 0.7%. The percentage of people born overseas was 2.8, compared with 28.8% nationally.

Religious affiliations were 26.2% Christian, 30.1% Māori religious beliefs, 0.3% Buddhist, and 0.3% other religions. People who answered that they had no religion were 39.9%, and 3.1% of people did not answer the census question.

Of those at least 15 years old, 90 (14.7%) people had a bachelor's or higher degree, 345 (56.4%) had a post-high school certificate or diploma, and 177 (28.9%) people exclusively held high school qualifications. The median income was $30,700, compared with $41,500 nationally. 21 people (3.4%) earned over $100,000 compared to 12.1% nationally. The employment status of those at least 15 was 255 (41.7%) full-time, 99 (16.2%) part-time, and 36 (5.9%) unemployed.

=== Wainui statistical area ===
Wainui statistical area covers 86.56 km^{2} (33.42 sq mi) and had an estimated population of 1,630 as of June 2025, with a population density of 19 people per km^{2}.

Historical population for Wainui
Year	Pop.	±% p.a.
2006	1,347	—
2013	1,365	+0.19%
2018	1,497	+1.86%
2023	1,512	+0.20%

Wainui had a population of 1,512 in the 2023 New Zealand census, an increase of 15 people (1.0%) since the 2018 census, and an increase of 147 people (10.8%) since the 2013 census. There were 732 males, 780 females, and 3 people of other genders in 468 dwellings. 1.6% of people identified as LGBTIQ+. The median age was 35.3 years (compared with 38.1 years nationally). There were 366 people (24.2%) aged under 15 years, 291 (19.2%) aged 15 to 29, 642 (42.5%) aged 30 to 64, and 213 (14.1%) aged 65 or older.

People could identify as more than one ethnicity. The results were 46.2% European (Pākehā); 67.1% Māori; 4.2% Pasifika; 0.8% Asian; 0.2% Middle Eastern, Latin American and African New Zealanders (MELAA); and 1.6% other, which includes people giving their ethnicity as "New Zealander". English was spoken by 94.8%, Māori by 31.2%, and other languages by 3.6%. No language could be spoken by 2.4% (e.g. too young to talk). New Zealand Sign Language was known by 0.6%. The percentage of people born overseas was 8.1, compared with 28.8% nationally.

Religious affiliations were 24.8% Christian, 19.4% Māori religious beliefs, 0.4% Buddhist, 0.6% New Age, and 0.8% other religions. People who answered that they had no religion were 50.2%, and 4.8% of people did not answer the census question.

Of those at least 15 years old, 216 (18.8%) people had a bachelor's or higher degree, 657 (57.3%) had a post-high school certificate or diploma, and 273 (23.8%) people exclusively held high school qualifications. The median income was $34,300, compared with $41,500 nationally. 84 people (7.3%) earned over $100,000 compared to 12.1% nationally. The employment status of those at least 15 was 510 (44.5%) full-time, 207 (18.1%) part-time, and 45 (3.9%) unemployed.

== Education ==
Tāneatua School is a co-educational state primary school for Year 1 to 8 students, with a roll of 130 as of July 2026. The school opened as Opouriao North School in 1897, sharing the teacher with Opouriao South School. It had changed its name to Taneatua School by 1903.
