= Makurata Paitini =

New Zealand weaver (died 1935)

Makurata Paitini, also called Te Waiohine (c. 1830 – 1935), was a New Zealand Māori weaver. She was from Ruatahuna and a member of the Ngāi Tūhoe iwi. She also served as an informant to historian and anthropologist Eldson Best.

== Works ==
In 1900, Paitini was commissioned by Charles Nelson, a hotel owner, to make a feather cloak. This cloak later was sold to the Auckland Museum in 1914. It is made of kākā and kahukura feathers, which have been woven into a fine flax fabric. Paitini signed her work on its taniko border, with MA on one side and KU on the other.

Paitini also wove a red kākā feather cloak for Augustus Hamilton, which she completed in 1906 after a year of work. Again, she signed her work on its taniko border with two pairs of small white triangles. The cloak was exhibited at the Museum of New Zealand Te Papa Tongarewa in 2012, alongside her 1900 cloak.

Paitini also wove korowai, a type of cloak covered with muka tassels.

== Personal life ==
Paitini had a husband, named Paitini Wi Tapeka.
