= Te Tapuwae =

New Zealand Māori cemetery near Otenuku Marae

Coordinates: 38°8′59.85″S 177°0′25.44″E

Te Tapuwae is a Māori cemetery at Otenuku Marae in Ruatoki, in the Bay of Plenty Region of New Zealand. Ngāi Tūhoe tribal leader Takurua Tamarau was buried on marae land in 1958, and subsequently that part of the land became a cemetery for the Ngāti Koura hapu of Tūhoe. Tribal leaders of the Ngāi Tūhoe iwi are traditionally buried there.

In Māori folklore, the cemetery is said to be protected by a powerful tapu which will curse anyone entering the cemetery without permission of the marae kaumātua. On leaving the sacred cemetery, visitors must always wash their hands with cleansing water.

Tuhoe refer to the buried ground as "Te Tapuwae, Te Urupa ō Ngā Rangatira ō Ngāi Tūhoe” ("Te Tapuwae is the elder of the kings of the Tuhoe people")
