= Te Urewera National Park =

Former National park of New Zealand

- IUCN category II (national park)
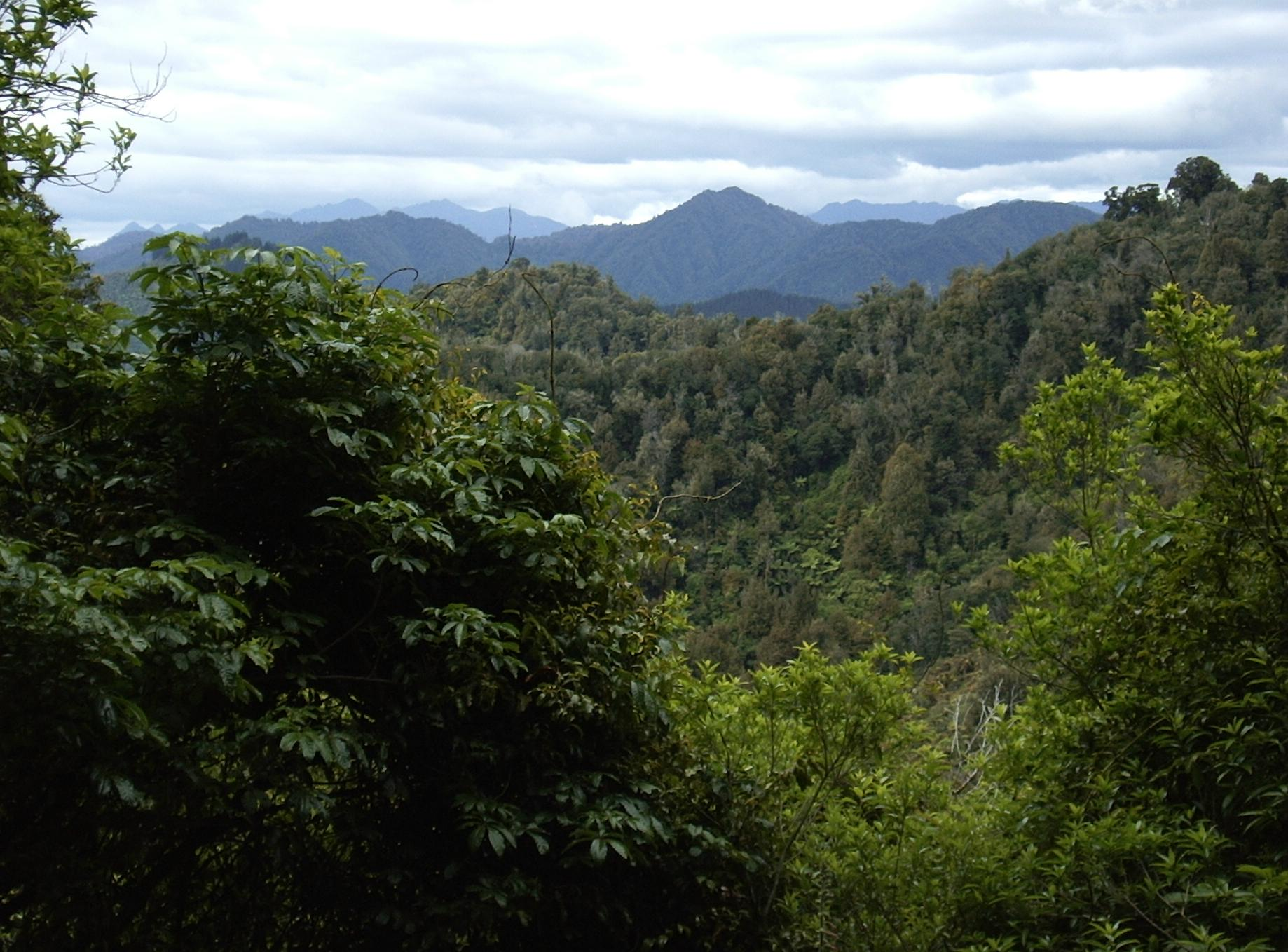

- Location within New Zealand
- Location: Hawke's Bay
- Nearest city: Gisborne, New Zealand
- Coordinates: 38°45′0″S 177°9′0″E
- Area: 2,127 km^{2} (821 sq mi)
- Established: 1954
- Disestablished: 2014
- Governing body: Department of Conservation
- Website: DOC page

Te Urewera National Park was a national park near the east coast of New Zealand's North Island, established as such in 1954 and disestablished in 2014, when it was replaced by a new legal entity and protected area named Te Urewera. The park covered an area of approximately 2,127 km^{2} and was located in the north of the Hawke's Bay region of the North Island. It was the largest of four national parks in the North Island and the most isolated rainforest in the region.

== History ==
Owing to its geographical isolation, the region was one of the last to be claimed by the British during colonisation in the 19th century.

On 28 July 1954, the catchment areas of Lake Waikaremoana and Lake Waikareiti and other Crown reserves were gazetted as a national park, and by 1957 proposals were well under way to add the rest of the Crown land in Te Urewera north of Ruatāhuna. This proposal was formalised in November 1957, when an additional 1,350 km^{2} were added. Further additions were made in 1962, 1975, and 1979, with smaller acquisitions of land and boundary alterations in the intervening period. The lake bed and Māori enclaves were not included in the gazetting of the park. The Crown had leased the lake bed, which was managed by the Department of Conservation.

In March 2013, the Tūhoe people signed a deed of settlement, settling the tribe's claims under the Waitangi Tribunal. Under the deal, the Tūhoe were to receive NZ$170 million and also be given more control over Te Urewera. It ceased to be a national park under the Te Urewera Act 2014, becoming Te Urewera, the first natural resource in the world to be awarded the same legal rights as a person.

== Name ==
Te Urewera is the traditional home of the Tūhoe people. The name means "burnt penis" in the Māori language and reflects a local legend.

== See also ==
- Protected areas of New Zealand
