= Lake Waikareiti =

Lake in the North Island of New Zealand

- Location within North Island
- Interactive map of Lake Waikareiti
- Location: Wairoa District, Hawke's Bay region, North Island
- Coordinates: 38.710°S 177.174°E
- Primary inflows: Ngawhakairara Stream
- Primary outflows: Mangapūwerawera Stream
- Basin countries: New Zealand
- Surface elevation: 880 m (2,890 ft)
- Islands: Motungārara Island, Motutorutoru Island, Rāhui Island, Te Arakōau Island, Te Kahaatuwai Island, Te Oneatahu Island

Lake Waikareiti, also spelt Lake Waikare Iti, is located in Te Urewera National Park in the North Island of New Zealand. A number of hiking trails are found within the catchment basin of the lake.

Its formation followed a landslide 18,000 years ago, in which a part of the landmass of 10 kilometers wide slid to the north-west. It is four kilometres to the northeast of the larger Lake Waikaremoana, into which it drains via the Aniwaniwa Stream. The smaller lake's surface is at an altitude of 880 metres above sea level - considerably higher than that of Waikaremoana - and as such the stream has several fine waterfalls such as the Āniwaniwa Falls and Papakorito Falls.

Several small islets are found in the lake. One of these, Rahui, itself contains a tiny lake - one of New Zealand's very rare recursive lakes.

Numerous flora species are found within the lake catchment basin, crown fern (Blechnum discolor) being a widespread understory plant. An assortment of birds found in the North Island are present at the national park except for the weka.

The New Zealand Ministry for Culture and Heritage gives a translation of "little waters" for Waikareiti.
