= Huiarau Range =

Mountain range in New Zealand

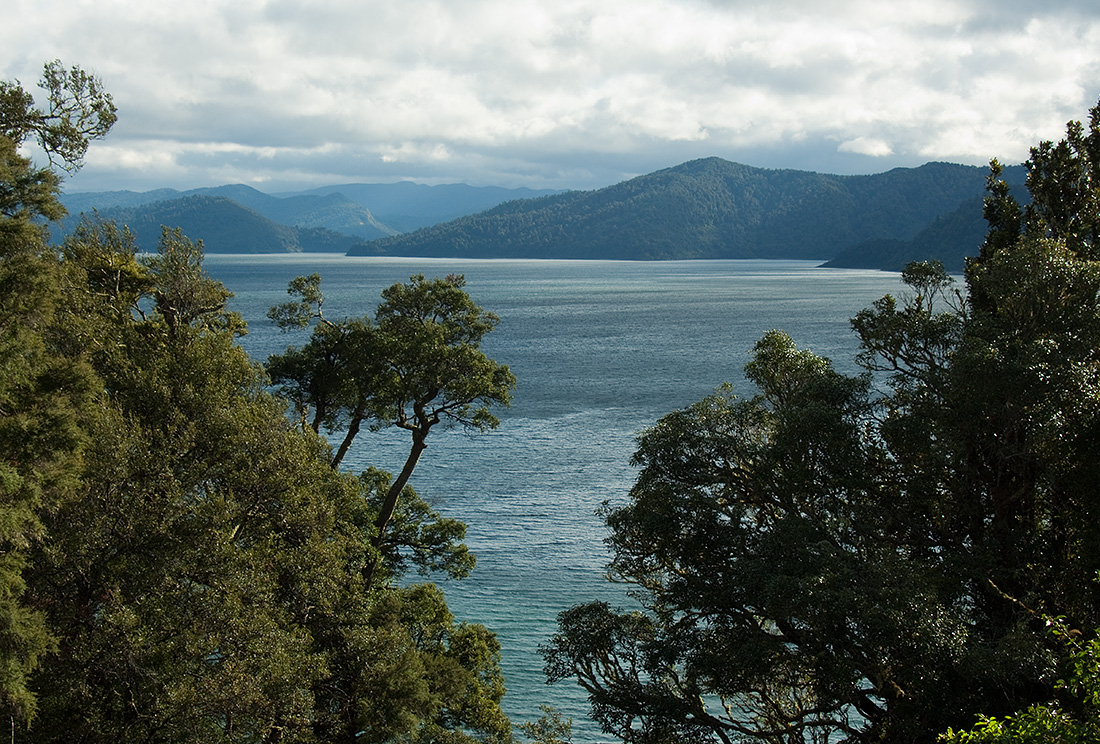
- The Huiarau Range seen behind Lake Waikaremoana

Highest point
- Peak: Manuoha
- Elevation: 1,392 m (4,567 ft)
- Coordinates: 38°45′S 177°00′E

Geography
- Location within New Zealand
- Country: New Zealand

The Huiarau Range is a range of mountains in Te Urewera in the northeast of New Zealand's North Island. Part of the spine of mountains that run roughly parallel with the island's east coast, it is a southwestern extension of the Raukūmara Range, lying between the end of that range and the North Island Volcanic Plateau.

Peaks within the range include Mount Manuoha (1403 m/4602 ft), Maungataniwha (1369 m/4491 ft), and Maungapohatu (1366 m/4482 ft). Lake Waikaremoana lies close to the southern edge of the range.
