= Waimana =

Rural community in Bay of Plenty Region, New Zealand

- Rural community
- Interactive map of Waimana
- Coordinates: 38.141°S 177.073°E
- Country: New Zealand
- Region: Bay of Plenty
- Territorial authority: Whakatāne District
- Ward: Te Urewera General Ward
- Community: Tāneatua Community
- Electorates: East Cape; Waiariki (Māori)

Government
  - Territorial authority: Whakatāne District Council
  - Regional council: Bay of Plenty Regional Council
  - Mayor of Whakatāne: Nándor Tánczos
  - East Cape MP: Dana Kirkpatrick
  - Waiariki MP: Rawiri Waititi

Area
  - Total: 7.10 km^{2} (2.74 sq mi)

Population (2023 Census)
  - Total: 216
  - Density: 30.4/km^{2} (78.8/sq mi)

Waimana is a rural valley in the Whakatāne District and Bay of Plenty Region of New Zealand's North Island. It is located in the northern Te Urewera. Waimana River, originally known as Tauranga River, running through the valley, joining the Ohinemataroa River one kilometre south-west of Tāneatua.

== History and culture ==
=== European settlement ===
The Waimana settlement is based around a wide, straight main road, dating back to its heyday before motor vehicles were introduced and goods roads were opened to other towns.

The Waimana-Nukuhou North Memorial Hall was opened on the main road in 1953. A plaque above the fireplace in the hall lists two local men who died in World War I and 17 local men in World War II. A display board near the fireplace names the 12 local men who served in World War I, the 74 local men in served in World War II, and the 36 ex-servicemen who moved to the district after 1945.

A framed bronze plaque was erected at the entrance to the hall in 1964, commemorating "the original pioneers of the Waimana settlement from 2nd Sept 1907 to 28th Sept 1909" with a list of 27 names.

The Waimana Gorge Road was partially closed in early July 2019 after part of the road was blocked by a slip. It was completely closed in early August due to heavy rain. The slip was cleared and the road was fully reopened later that month.

=== Marae ===
The valley is the rohe (tribal area) of the Tuhoe people. It has several marae:

- Piripari Marae and Tamaikaimoana meeting house, affiliated with Tamakaimoana and Ngāi Tātua, established in 1962
- Pouahinau Marae and Tūranga Pikitoi meeting house, affiliated with Tūranga Pikitoi, established in 1933
- Rāhiri Marae and Rāhiri ō te Rangi meeting house, affiliated with Ngāti Rere, established between 1875 and 1880
- Rāroa Marae and Te Poho ō Tānemoeahi meeting house, affiliated with Ko Tamaruarangi, established in 1925
- Tanatana Marae and Te Poho ō Tuhoe meeting house, affiliated with Ngāti Rere, established in 1919
- Tataiāhape Marae and Takutai ō Terangi meeting house, affiliated with Ngāti Raka, established in 1906
- Tauanui Marae and Te Poho ō Tamatea meeting house, affiliated with Whakatāne Hapū, established in 1933
- Tāwhana Marae and Ngā Tau E Maha meeting house, affiliated with Ngā Maihi, established in 1935

In October 2020, the Government committed $508,757 from the Provincial Growth Fund to upgrade Tataiāhape Marae, Piripari Marae, Matahi Marae and Tanatana Marae. It also committed $622,833 to upgrade Raroa Marae and two other marae.

== Demographics ==
Waimana locality covers 7.10 km^{2} (2.74 sq mi). It is part of the Waingarara-Waimana statistical area.

Historical population for Waimana locality
| Year | Pop. | ±% p.a. |
|---|---|---|
| 2006 | 171 | — |
| 2013 | 201 | +2.34% |
| 2018 | 195 | −0.60% |
| 2023 | 216 | +2.07% |
The 2006 population is for a smaller area of 6.95 km^{2}. Source:

Waimana locality had a population of 216 in the 2023 New Zealand census, an increase of 21 people (10.8%) since the 2018 census, and an increase of 15 people (7.5%) since the 2013 census. There were 108 males, 105 females, and 3 people of other genders in 54 dwellings. 1.4% of people identified as LGBTIQ+. The median age was 30.1 years (compared with 38.1 years nationally). There were 60 people (27.8%) aged under 15 years, 48 (22.2%) aged 15 to 29, 93 (43.1%) aged 30 to 64, and 15 (6.9%) aged 65 or older.

People could identify as more than one ethnicity. The results were 34.7% European (Pākehā), 80.6% Māori, 8.3% Pasifika, and 2.8% Asian. English was spoken by 94.4%, and Māori by 40.3%. No language could be spoken by 4.2% (e.g. too young to talk). The percentage of people born overseas was 4.2, compared with 28.8% nationally.

Religious affiliations were 20.8% Christian, 1.4% Hindu, 20.8% Māori religious beliefs, and 1.4% other religions. People who answered that they had no religion were 55.6%, and 2.8% of people did not answer the census question.

Of those at least 15 years old, 24 (15.4%) people had a bachelor's or higher degree, 96 (61.5%) had a post-high school certificate or diploma, and 33 (21.2%) people exclusively held high school qualifications. The median income was $34,000, compared with $41,500 nationally. 9 people (5.8%) earned over $100,000 compared to 12.1% nationally. The employment status of those at least 15 was 72 (46.2%) full-time, 24 (15.4%) part-time, and 9 (5.8%) unemployed.

=== Waingarara-Waimana statistical area ===
Waingarara-Waimana statistical area covers 1,448.10 km^{2} (559.11 sq mi) and had an estimated population of 2,630 as of June 2025, with a population density of 1.8 people per km^{2}.

Historical population for Waingarara-Waimana
| Year | Pop. | ±% p.a. |
|---|---|---|
| 2006 | 2,196 | — |
| 2013 | 2,256 | +0.39% |
| 2018 | 2,361 | +0.91% |
| 2023 | 2,523 | +1.34% |

Waingarara-Waimana had a population of 2,523 in the 2023 New Zealand census, an increase of 162 people (6.9%) since the 2018 census, and an increase of 267 people (11.8%) since the 2013 census. There were 1,245 males, 1,275 females, and 6 people of other genders in 726 dwellings. 1.1% of people identified as LGBTIQ+. The median age was 32.8 years (compared with 38.1 years nationally). There were 654 people (25.9%) aged under 15 years, 522 (20.7%) aged 15 to 29, 1,032 (40.9%) aged 30 to 64, and 318 (12.6%) aged 65 or older.

People could identify as more than one ethnicity. The results were 35.9% European (Pākehā), 77.9% Māori, 4.5% Pasifika, 1.0% Asian, and 0.7% other, which includes people giving their ethnicity as "New Zealander". English was spoken by 93.1%, Māori by 46.7%, Samoan by 0.5%, and other languages by 1.8%. No language could be spoken by 3.0% (e.g. too young to talk). New Zealand Sign Language was known by 0.7%. The percentage of people born overseas was 3.9, compared with 28.8% nationally.

Religious affiliations were 19.6% Christian, 0.1% Hindu, 26.2% Māori religious beliefs, 0.2% New Age, 0.1% Jewish, and 1.1% other religions. People who answered that they had no religion were 45.3%, and 8.6% of people did not answer the census question.

Of those at least 15 years old, 291 (15.6%) people had a bachelor's or higher degree, 1,104 (59.1%) had a post-high school certificate or diploma, and 477 (25.5%) people exclusively held high school qualifications. The median income was $31,000, compared with $41,500 nationally. 81 people (4.3%) earned over $100,000 compared to 12.1% nationally. The employment status of those at least 15 was 777 (41.6%) full-time, 267 (14.3%) part-time, and 120 (6.4%) unemployed.

== Education ==
Waimana School is a co-educational state primary school for Year 1 to 8 students in the main Waimama settlement, with a roll of 22 as of July 2026. The school opened in 1908.

Nukuhou North School, another co-educational state primary school for Year 1 to 8 students, is located north-east of the settlement, with a roll of 55. It also opened in 1908.

== Climate ==
Climate data for Waimana (1991–2020 normals, extremes 1965–2002)
| Month | Jan | Feb | Mar | Apr | May | Jun | Jul | Aug | Sep | Oct | Nov | Dec | Year |
|---|---|---|---|---|---|---|---|---|---|---|---|---|---|
| Record high °C (°F) | 33.4 (92.1) | 32.6 (90.7) | 30.0 (86.0) | 26.6 (79.9) | 24.9 (76.8) | 21.0 (69.8) | 19.8 (67.6) | 21.3 (70.3) | 25.0 (77.0) | 26.9 (80.4) | 30.2 (86.4) | 32.7 (90.9) | 33.4 (92.1) |
| Mean daily maximum °C (°F) | 24.2 (75.6) | 24.4 (75.9) | 22.8 (73.0) | 20.3 (68.5) | 17.7 (63.9) | 15.0 (59.0) | 14.4 (57.9) | 15.3 (59.5) | 17.0 (62.6) | 18.6 (65.5) | 20.4 (68.7) | 22.4 (72.3) | 19.4 (66.9) |
| Daily mean °C (°F) | 18.7 (65.7) | 19.0 (66.2) | 17.0 (62.6) | 14.3 (57.7) | 11.6 (52.9) | 9.1 (48.4) | 8.8 (47.8) | 9.4 (48.9) | 11.3 (52.3) | 13.1 (55.6) | 15.0 (59.0) | 17.4 (63.3) | 13.7 (56.7) |
| Mean daily minimum °C (°F) | 13.3 (55.9) | 13.5 (56.3) | 11.1 (52.0) | 8.4 (47.1) | 5.6 (42.1) | 3.2 (37.8) | 3.1 (37.6) | 3.5 (38.3) | 5.6 (42.1) | 7.6 (45.7) | 9.6 (49.3) | 12.5 (54.5) | 8.1 (46.6) |
| Record low °C (°F) | 0.9 (33.6) | 1.4 (34.5) | 0.5 (32.9) | −2.8 (27.0) | −3.9 (25.0) | −5.9 (21.4) | −6.7 (19.9) | −4.8 (23.4) | −3.0 (26.6) | −1.9 (28.6) | −0.8 (30.6) | 0.7 (33.3) | −6.7 (19.9) |
| Average rainfall mm (inches) | 118.3 (4.66) | 106.4 (4.19) | 132.3 (5.21) | 145.2 (5.72) | 109.9 (4.33) | 162.8 (6.41) | 162.4 (6.39) | 162.5 (6.40) | 142.5 (5.61) | 127.9 (5.04) | 172.3 (6.78) | 142.8 (5.62) | 1,685.3 (66.36) |
| Mean monthly sunshine hours | 191.8 | 170.4 | 180.5 | 149.0 | 137.2 | 103.2 | 106.1 | 142.0 | 136.8 | 163.8 | 151.4 | 166.6 | 1,798.8 |
Source: NIWA (rainfall 1981–2010)
