= Henry Te Reiwhati Vercoe =

Henry Te Reiwhati Vercoe OBE DSO DCM (1884–1962) was a notable New Zealand horseman, soldier, farmer and community leader. Of Māori descent, he identified with the Ngāti Pikiao and Ngāti Tuara iwi, part of the Te Arawa confederation. He was born in Maketu, Bay of Plenty, New Zealand in 1884.

In the 1953 Coronation Honours, Vercoe was appointed an Officer of the Order of the British Empire.
