= Whakatāne River =

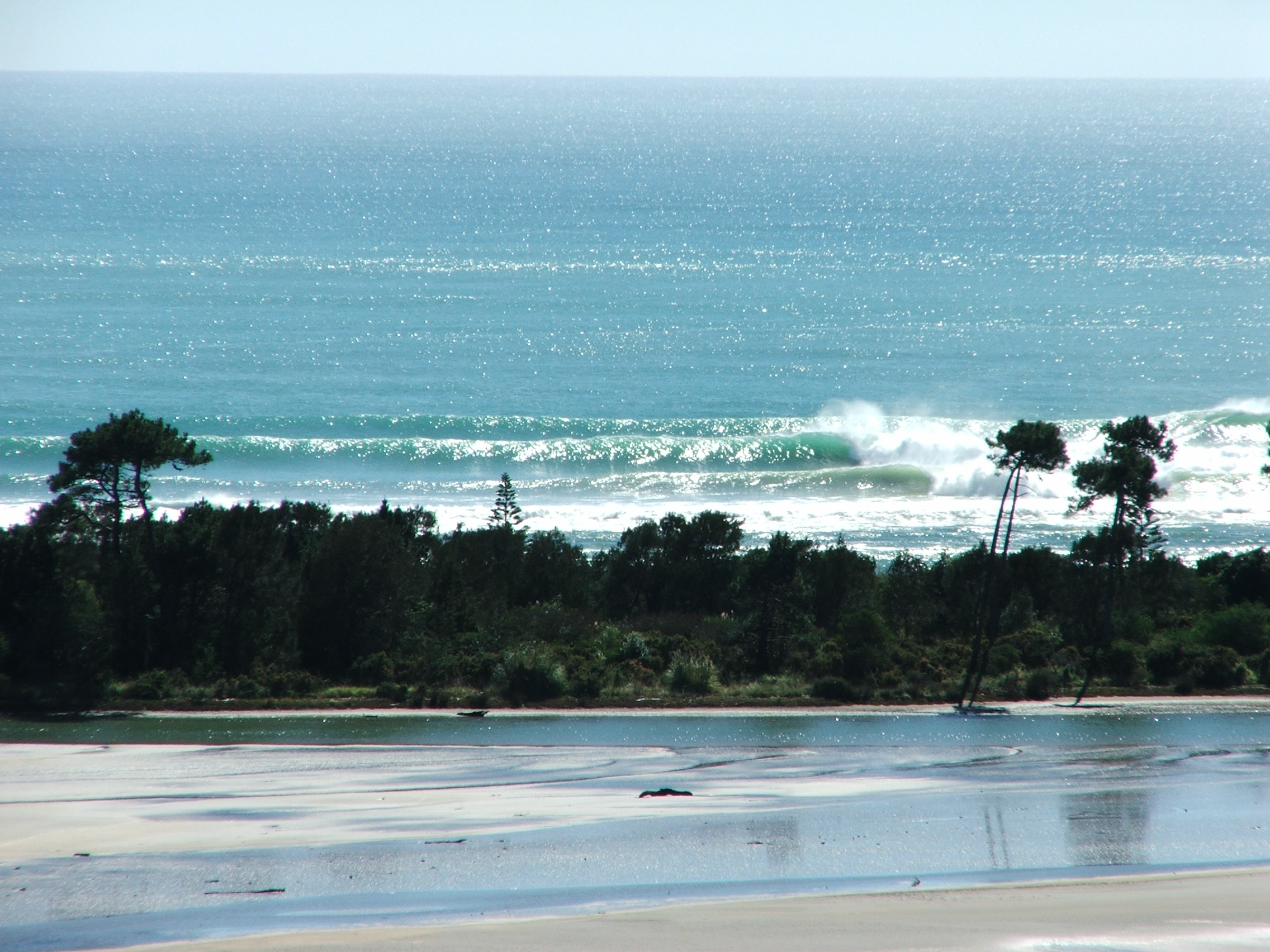
- The mouth of the Whakatāne River
- Route of the Whakatāne River
- Mouth of the Whakatāne River Whakatāne River (North Island)

Location
- Country: New Zealand

Physical characteristics
- Source: Confluence of the Kopaenui Stream and Mangaorongo Stream
  - coordinates: 38°37′53″S 176°58′34″E
  - elevation: 720 m (2,360 ft)
- Mouth
  - location: Bay of Plenty
  - coordinates: 37°56′35″S 177°00′34″E
  - elevation: 115 m (377 ft)
- Length: 95 km (59 mi)
- Basin size: 1,280 km^{2} (490 sq mi)

Basin features
- Progression: Whakatāne River → Bay of Plenty → Pacific Ocean
- Landmarks: Muriwai's Cave; Wairaka Statue, Turuturu Roimata, Whakatane Heads; Whakatane Lookout, Te Hau Tutua Park
- Tributaries
  - left: Waihui Stream, Okahukura Stream, Omaruhaua Stream, Omoeroa Stream, Otukehu Stream, Manatihono Stream, Te Koau Stream, Okue Stream, Okarika Stream, Waitawhero Stream, Rerehape Stream, Mangahohere Stream, Mangateitei Stream, Manaohou Stream, Tāneatua Stream, Te Karaka Stream, Mangaotane Stream, Marumaru Stream, Rimuroa Stream, Otapuwhero Stream, Otere Stream, Maroera Stream, Kanihi Stream, Te Poutu Stream, Tirarangi Stream, Te Maire Stream, Pukawa Stream, Raorao Stream, Wairiko Stream, Mahihirangi Stream, Wharekura Stream, Owaka Stream, Kawekawe Stream, Opurana Stream, Ohaua Stream, Owhakatoro Stream, Poroporo Stream, Te Rahu Canal, Orini Stream
  - right: Orangikawa Stream, Ohaware Stream, Opuhou Stream, Omahiti Stream, Ruataniwha Stream, Waitawa Stream, Otaimoho Stream, Mahakirua Stream, Oharaki Stream, Manangaatiuhi Stream, Mangatawhero Stream, Arakoko Stream, Kotukutuku Stream, Okakara Stream, Okokako Stream, Moawhara Stream, Hohoweka Stream, Opuku Stream, Waikohu Stream, Kaiporoporo Stream, Waikare River, Te Ākau Stream, Ohane Stream, Oripa Stream, Moerangi Stream, Purutawhao Stream, Hukikapaea Stream, Waimahoe Stream, Ohora Stream, Otaneuri Stream, Wairere Stream, Tapuaeharuru Stream, Okohau Stream, Otekura Stream, Tamahine Mataroa Stream, Maungawhio Stream, Otapora Stream, Hokowhitu Stream, Taimatua Stream, Opawa Stream, Ohinenaenae Stream, Waikekereao Stream, Totara Stream, Tauranga River, Ohineteraraku Stream, Wainuitewhara Stream, Wairere Stream
- Waterfalls: Tarakena Rapids, Nihootekiore Rapids, Wharetamore Rapids
- Bridges: Whakatane Bridge

The Whakatāne River or Ōhinemataroa is a major river of the Bay of Plenty region in the North Island of New Zealand.

It flows north from near the small town of Ruatāhuna through Te Urewera, reaching the sea through the town of Whakatāne. The river is 95 kilometres (59 mi) long.
