= Ruatāhuna =

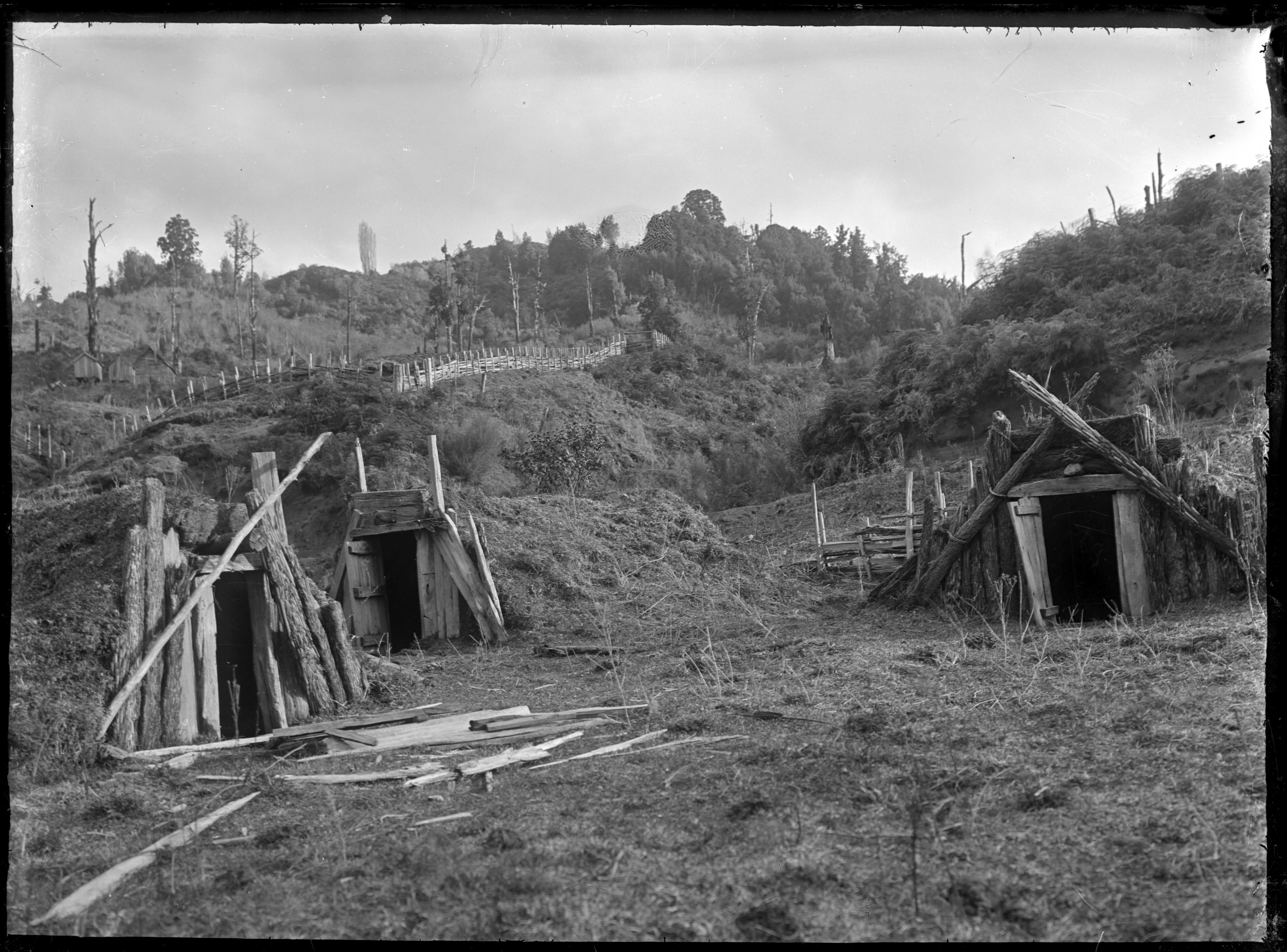
- Storage pits for kūmara (sweet potato) at Ruatāhuna in 1930
- Interactive map of Ruatāhuna
- Coordinates: 38°33′S 176°57′E
- Country: New Zealand
- Region: Bay of Plenty
- Territorial authority: Whakatāne District
- Ward: Urewera Ward
- Community: Murupara Community
- Electorates: East Cape; Waiariki (Māori)

Government
  - Territorial authority: Whakatāne District Council
  - Regional council: Bay of Plenty Regional Council
  - Mayor of Whakatāne: Nándor Tánczos
  - East Cape MP: Dana Kirkpatrick
  - Waiariki MP: Rawiri Waititi

Area
  - Total: 15.06 km^{2} (5.81 sq mi)

Population (2023 Census)
  - Total: 117
  - Density: 7.77/km^{2} (20.1/sq mi)

Ruatāhuna is a small town in the remote country of Te Urewera, in the northeast of New Zealand's North Island. It is 90 kilometres directly west of Gisborne, and 18 kilometres northwest of Lake Waikaremoana. By road, it is 50 kilometres south-east of Murupara, and 110 kilometres north-west of Wairoa. It is on the upper reaches of the Whakatāne River, and surrounded on three sides by the Te Urewera protected area, formerly the Te Urewera National Park. The road that runs from Murupara through Ruatahuna to Āniwaniwa on Lake Waikaremoana, a large part of which is unsealed, used to be designated as part of State Highway 38. It is a subdivision of the Galatea-Murupara ward of the Whakatāne District.

== History ==
The area was the site of much action during the New Zealand Wars of the 1860s and 1870s. From 1870 to 1888, one of the largest wharenui ever built, Te Whai-a-te-Motu, was constructed for Te Kooti and his followers.

== Demographics ==
Ruatāhuna covers 15.06 km^{2} (5.81 sq mi). It is part of the Galatea statistical area.

Historical population
Year	Pop.	±% p.a.
2006	186	—
2013	99	−8.62%
2018	93	−1.24%
2023	117	+4.70%
The 2006 population is for a larger area of 82.56 km^{2}. Source:

Ruatāhuna had a population of 117 in the 2023 New Zealand census, an increase of 24 people (25.8%) since the 2018 census, and an increase of 18 people (18.2%) since the 2013 census. There were 63 males and 51 females in 24 dwellings. The median age was 26.4 years (compared with 38.1 years nationally). There were 33 people (28.2%) aged under 15 years, 30 (25.6%) aged 15 to 29, 42 (35.9%) aged 30 to 64, and 9 (7.7%) aged 65 or older.

People could identify as more than one ethnicity. The results were 15.4% European (Pākehā), 97.4% Māori, 5.1% Pasifika, and 2.6% Asian. English was spoken by 87.2%, and Māori by 69.2%. No language could be spoken by 5.1% (e.g. too young to talk). No one was born overseas.

Religious affiliations were 15.4% Christian, and 38.5% Māori religious beliefs. People who answered that they had no religion were 41.0%, and 2.6% of people did not answer the census question.

Of those at least 15 years old, 6 (7.1%) people had a bachelor's or higher degree, 51 (60.7%) had a post-high school certificate or diploma, and 30 (35.7%) people exclusively held high school qualifications. The median income was $18,700, compared with $41,500 nationally. The employment status of those at least 15 was 21 (25.0%) full-time, 15 (17.9%) part-time, and 12 (14.3%) unemployed.

== Marae ==
Ruatāhuna is within the rohe (tribal area) of Tūhoe, and has several marae affiliated with Tūhoe hapū:

- Kākānui (Tīpapa) marae and Kākahu Tāpiki meeting house, affiliated with Kākahu Tāpiki.
- Mātaatua marae and Te Whai-a-te-Motu meeting house, affiliated with Te Urewera.
- Ōhāua or Ōhāua te Rangi marae and Te Poho-o-Pōtiki meeting house, affiliated with Ngāti Rongo.
- Ōpūtao marae and Te Ngāwari meeting house, affiliated with Ngāti Tāwhaki.
- Ōtekura marae and Te Ōhāki meeting house, affiliated with Tamakaimoana.
- Pāpueru marae and Te Whatu o Te Kanohi meeting house, affiliated with Ngāti Tāwhaki.
- Tātāhoata marae and Te Tapuae meeting house, affiliated with Ngāi Te Riu.
- Te Umuroa marae and Te Poho-o-Parahaki meeting house, affiliated with Ngāti Manunui.
- Uwhiārae marae and Te Paena meeting house, affiliated with Ngāi Te Paena.
- Te Wai-iti marae and Te Poho o Kurī Kino meeting house, affiliated with Ngāti Kurī Kino.

In October 2020, the Government committed $3,996,258 from the Provincial Growth Fund to upgrade Kākānui, Mātaatua, Ōhāua, Pāpueru, Tātāhoata, Uwhiārae, Te Wai-iti marae, creating 79 jobs.

== Education ==
Te Kura Kaupapa Māori o Huiarau is a co-educational state Māori language immersion area school for Year 1 to 13 students, with a roll of 56 as of July 2026. It opened in 1917 as Huiarau Native School.

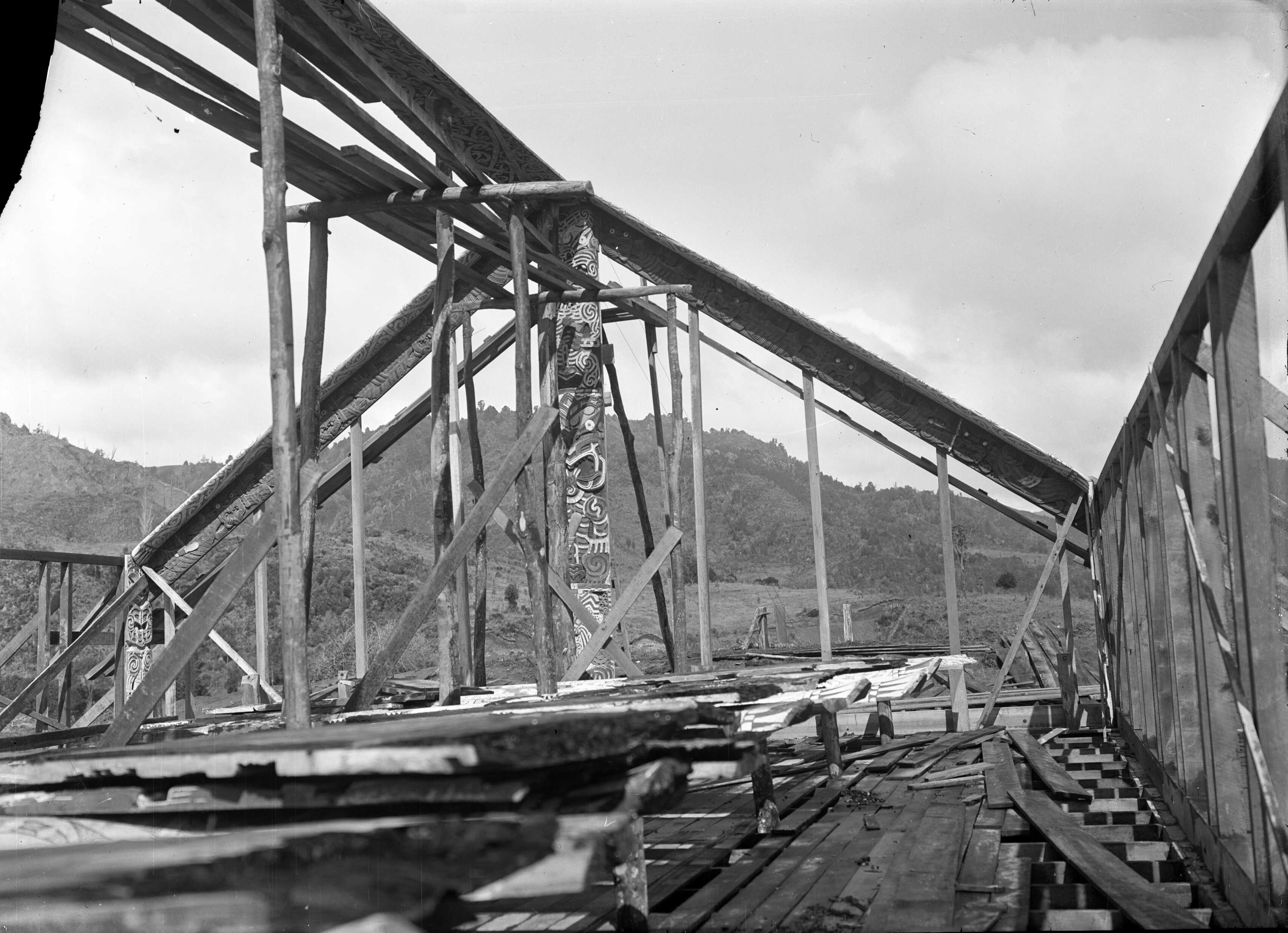
Te Whai-a-te-Motu meeting house under construction in the 1910s

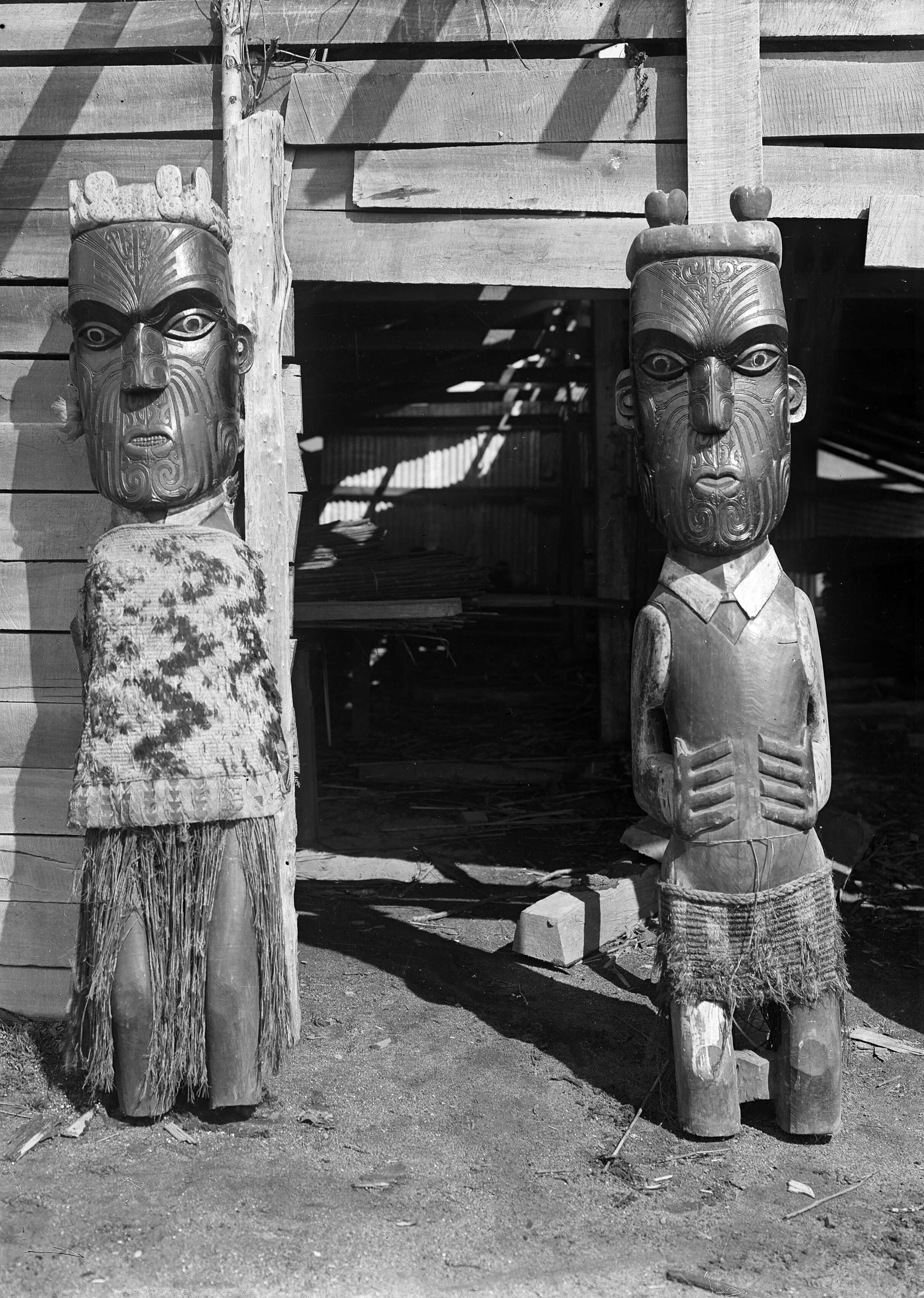
Māori wood carvings at Te Whai-a-te-Motu, Mātaatua marae

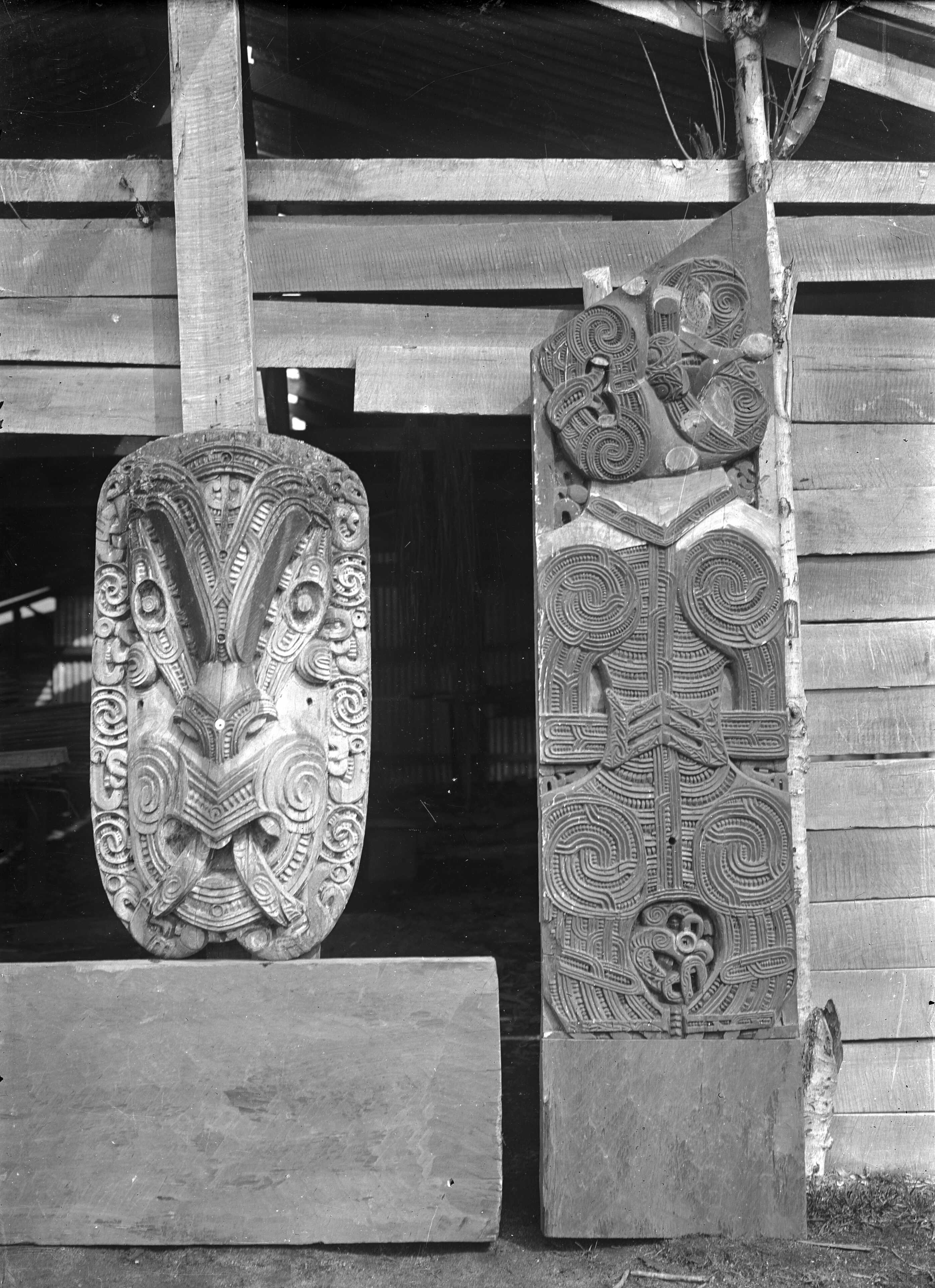
Māori wood carvings at Te Whai-a-te-Motu, Mātaatua marae

== Climate ==
Climate data for Tarapounamu, elevation 701 m (2,300 ft), (1991–2020)
Month	Jan	Feb	Mar	Apr	May	Jun	Jul	Aug	Sep	Oct	Nov	Dec	Year
Mean daily maximum °C (°F)	20.1 (68.2)	19.9 (67.8)	17.6 (63.7)	14.2 (57.6)	11.5 (52.7)	8.9 (48.0)	8.2 (46.8)	9.1 (48.4)	11.2 (52.2)	13.6 (56.5)	16.4 (61.5)	18.2 (64.8)	14.1 (57.4)
Daily mean °C (°F)	15.2 (59.4)	15.4 (59.7)	13.4 (56.1)	10.7 (51.3)	8.5 (47.3)	6.2 (43.2)	5.4 (41.7)	5.8 (42.4)	7.5 (45.5)	9.3 (48.7)	11.6 (52.9)	13.6 (56.5)	10.2 (50.4)
Mean daily minimum °C (°F)	10.2 (50.4)	10.9 (51.6)	9.2 (48.6)	7.3 (45.1)	5.5 (41.9)	3.4 (38.1)	2.6 (36.7)	2.6 (36.7)	3.9 (39.0)	5.1 (41.2)	6.8 (44.2)	8.9 (48.0)	6.4 (43.5)
Average rainfall mm (inches)	116.5 (4.59)	60.2 (2.37)	113.8 (4.48)	145.1 (5.71)	165.3 (6.51)	163.3 (6.43)	162.5 (6.40)	187.8 (7.39)	147.8 (5.82)	113.7 (4.48)	92.1 (3.63)	117.8 (4.64)	1,585.9 (62.45)
Source: NIWA

== Notable people ==
- Makurata Paitini, Māori weaver
