= Ruatoki North =

Ruatoki
- Interactive map of Ruatoki
- Coordinates: 38°8′28.2″S 177°0′22.2″E
- Country: New Zealand
- Region: Bay of Plenty
- Territorial authority: Whakatāne District
- Ward: Te Urewera General Ward
- Community: Tāneatua Community
- Electorates: East Cape; Waiariki (Māori)

Government
  - Territorial authority: Whakatāne District Council
  - Regional council: Bay of Plenty Regional Council
  - Mayor of Whakatāne: Nándor Tánczos
  - East Cape MP: Dana Kirkpatrick
  - Waiariki MP: Rawiri Waititi

Area
  - Total: 34.33 km^{2} (13.25 sq mi)

Population (2023 Census)
  - Total: 582
  - Density: 17.0/km^{2} (43.9/sq mi)

Ruatoki North is a town in the eastern Bay of Plenty of New Zealand, just south of the small town of Tāneatua and approximately 20 kilometres (12 mi) south of the town of Whakatāne. The Whakatāne River runs northwards through the Ruatoki Valley and has formed broad alluvial flats. The main settlement of Ruatoki North is on the eastern side of the river.

The population of approximately 600 people are predominantly Māori of the Tūhoe iwi. The main economic activities in the Ruatoki Valley are dairy farming and cropping.

== History ==
Tūhoe people started dairy farming at Ruatoki from at least the 1890s. The first school – Ruatoki Native School – and the first post office opened at the same site on the eastern side of the Whakatāne River in 1896. In 1908 two telegraph offices opened, one at the school and known as Ruatoki, and the other a little to the north at the store in the township and known as Ruatoki North.

A cheese factory opened in the township in 1908. The factory burned down in the late 1920s and a new concrete factory replaced it in 1928. The factory closed in 1964 and has since been demolished.

Ruatoki was one of the main sites involved in the 2007 New Zealand police raids, conducted under the Terrorism Suppression Act 2002.

== Demographics ==
Ruatoki, including other small settlements further up the west bank of the Whakatāne River, covers 34.33 km^{2} (13.25 sq mi). It is part of the Waingarara-Waimana statistical area.

Historical population
Year	Pop.	±% p.a.
2006	465	—
2013	486	+0.63%
2018	519	+1.32%
2023	582	+2.32%

Ruatoki had a population of 582 in the 2023 New Zealand census, an increase of 63 people (12.1%) since the 2018 census, and an increase of 96 people (19.8%) since the 2013 census. There were 276 males, 303 females, and 3 people of other genders in 159 dwellings. There were 153 people (26.3%) aged under 15 years, 129 (22.2%) aged 15 to 29, 216 (37.1%) aged 30 to 64, and 84 (14.4%) aged 65 or older.

People could identify as more than one ethnicity. The results were 10.3% European (Pākehā), 96.9% Māori, and 4.1% Pasifika. English was spoken by 89.2%, Māori by 75.3%, and Samoan by 0.5%. No language could be spoken by 2.6% (e.g. too young to talk). New Zealand Sign Language was known by 1.5%. The percentage of people born overseas was 1.5, compared with 28.8% nationally.

Religious affiliations were 15.5% Christian, 43.8% Māori religious beliefs, and 2.1% other religions. People who answered that they had no religion were 29.4%, and 10.8% of people did not answer the census question.

Of those at least 15 years old, 84 (19.6%) people had a bachelor's or higher degree, 237 (55.2%) had a post-high school certificate or diploma, and 96 (22.4%) people exclusively held high school qualifications. 6 people (1.4%) earned over $100,000 compared to 12.1% nationally. The employment status of those at least 15 was 171 (39.9%) full-time, 54 (12.6%) part-time, and 33 (7.7%) unemployed.

== Culture ==
=== Marae ===
There are ten marae, which are meeting places for local Tūhoe hapū.

- Ngāhina Marae and Tāwhaki meeting house is affiliated with Ngāti Tāwhaki.
- Ōhotu Marae and Tūhoe Pōtiki meeting house is affiliated with Te Whānau Pani.
- Ōtenuku Marae, Tahatu o Te Ao meeting house and Te Tapuwae cemetery is affiliated with Ngāti Kōura.
- Paneteure or Kaiti Marae and Hui te Rangiora meeting house is affiliated with Ngāti Rongo.
- Papakāinga Marae and Kōura-kino meeting house is affiliated with Ngāti Kōura.
- Rewarewa Marae, including Te Rangimoaho and Kuramihirangi meeting houses, is affiliated with Te Māhurehure.
- Tauarau Marae and Rongokarae meeting house is affiliated with Ngāti Rongo.
- Te Tōtara Marae and Te Puhi o Mātaatua meeting house is affiliated with Te Urewera.
- Waikirikiri Marae and Toi-kai-rakau meeting house is affiliated with Hāmua and Ngāti Mura.
- Ōwhakatoro Marae and Tā Apirana Turupa Ngata meeting house is affiliated with Ngāti Rongo.

In October 2020, the Government committed $263,775 from the Provincial Growth Fund to upgrade Ngāhina Marae, creating 12 jobs. It also contributed $622,833 to Ōtenuku, Paneteure and two other marae; $477,707 to Tauarau marae; and $1,646,820 to Waikirikiri and 5 other marae.

== Education ==
Local Tuhoe leaders requested a school in 1891 and the Ruatoki Native School opened on the eastern side of the Whakatāne River on 4 June 1896. It became a district high school from 1946–47 until the secondary section closed in the 1970s. In 1978 it became New Zealand's first bilingual primary school. It then became a Māori language immersion school for children up to standard two, remaining bilingual for standards three and four. On 1 September 1992 it became an area school for children up to form seven and the first official kura kaupapa school. It is now Te Wharekura o Ruatoki, a co-educational state area school that teaches Year 1 to 13 students in the Māori language. It has a roll of 231 as of July 2026.

Children from west of the river attended Ruatoki Native School in the early decades. As there was no bridge, they waded the river, and missed school when the river was in flood. Consequently, Tawera Native School opened on the western side of the river on 29 July 1931. It is now Tawera Bilingual School, a co-educational state primary school for Year 1 to 8 students that teaches in Māori and English language. It has a roll of 35 as of July 2026.

== Notable people ==
- Tāme Iti (born 1952), Tūhoe activist and artist
- Kōhine Pōnika (1920–1990), Ngāti Porou and Tūhoe composer
- Hikawera Te Kurapa (1907–1985), Tūhoe tribal tohunga, horse-breaker, farmer and ringatu leader
- Te Ngahuru (died around 1823), Tūhoe leader and warrior
- Stacey Waaka, rugby player
- Arnold Manaaki Wilson (1928–2012), Tūhoe and Te Arawa artist and educator
