= Ngāi Tūhoe =

Māori iwi (tribe) in New Zealand

- Iwi (tribe) in Māoridom
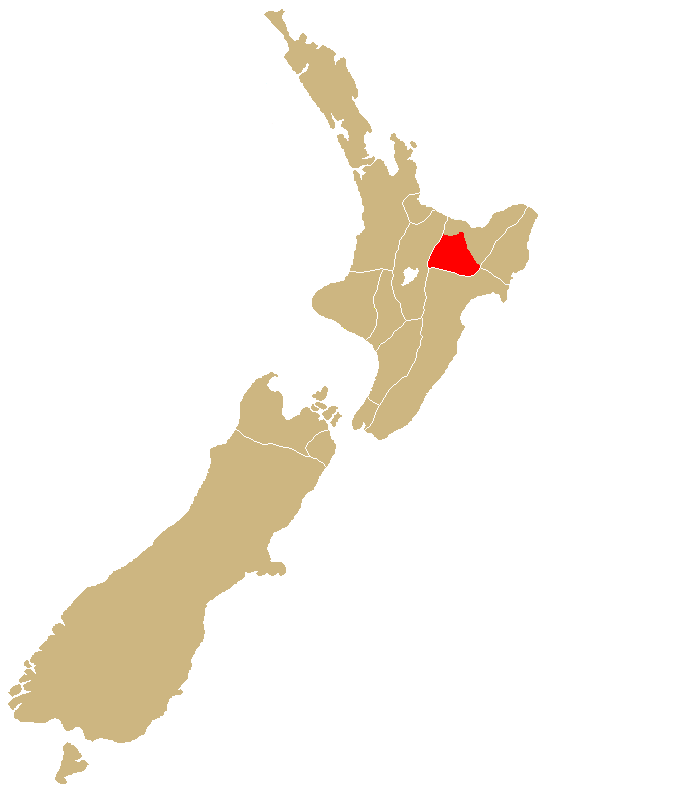
- Rohe (region): Te Urewera
- Waka (canoe): Mātaatua, Nukutere
- Population: 34,890
- Website: www.ngaituhoe.iwi.nz

Ngāi Tūhoe (Māori pronunciation: [ˈŋaːi ˈtʉːhɔɛ]), often known simply as Tūhoe, is a Māori iwi (tribe) of New Zealand. It takes its name from an ancestral figure, Tūhoe-pōtiki. Tūhoe is a Māori language word meaning 'steep' or 'high noon'. The Tūhoe people also bear the sobriquet Nga Tamariki o te Kohu ('the children of the mist'). Tūhoe traditional land is at Te Urewera (the former Te Urewera National Park) in eastern North Island, a steep, heavily forested area which includes Lake Waikaremoana. Tūhoe traditionally relied on the forest for their needs. The iwi territory is vast and undeveloped. Tūhoe is considered one of the largest landowners in New Zealand. The territory has six main centres of population, including Ruatāhuna, Waikaremoana, Waimana Valley, Ruatoki, and Tāneatua. Maungapōhatu is the inner sanctum of Te Urewera, and is the most sacred of their ancestral mountains. The Tūhoe country had a reputation among the neighbouring tribes as a graveyard for invading forces.

Tūhoe people have a reputation for their continued strong adherence to Māori identity and for their unbroken use of the Māori language, which 62% of them speak as of 2018. The iwi population is estimated to number between 33,000 and 46,000. About 30% still live on their tribal lands; most of the rest live in towns on the fringes of Te Urewera and in the larger North Island cities. At least 5,000 live in Australia. Subtribes of the Tūhoe include Ngāti Koura, Ngāti Rongo, Ngāti Tāwhaki, Tamakaimoana, Ngāti Whare, Te Whānau Pani, Ngāti Hinekura and Patuheuheu.

The Tūhoe continue to maintain camps in Te Urewera and help run conservation programmes for endangered birds, such as the North Island brown kiwi and the North Island kōkako. Many Tūhoe return to their homelands every two years for the Te Hui Ahurei a Tūhoe (Tūhoe Festival), which features kapa haka, debates, sports competitions, and fashion shows. The event offers a valuable opportunity to maintain connections with friends and relatives.

== History ==
Tūhoe derives its name from Tūhoe Pōtiki, a descendant of Toroa, who came to Aotearoa (New Zealand) as captain of the Mātaatua canoe, and of Toi-te-huatahi and Pōtiki, who had arrived in the region at an earlier date. A traditional saying, Toi raua ko Potiki te whenua, na Tūhoe te mana me te rangatiratanga ("the land is from Toi and Pōtiki, the mana and rangatiratanga is from Tūhoe") reflects this ancestry. Tūhoe is thus part of the Mātaatua tribal confederation, along with Ngāti Awa and Whakatōhea to the north and other iwi further afield.

=== 19th century ===
Tūhoe had little direct contact with the early European settlers. The first major contact occurred when the iwi fought against the settler colonial government in the Battle of Ōrākau in 1864. Rewi Maniapoto, who had some tribal links to Tūhoe, visited Te Urewera in 1862 and persuaded them to take part in the rebellion against the government; he went against the wishes of some of the elders. Initially reluctant, the Tūhoe provided Rewi with ammunition to support the rebellion. During a ceasefire in the battle, under a flag of truce, Gilbert Mair, a translator, was shot in the shoulder by a Tūhoe warrior. Nearly all the Tūhoe at the battle were killed.

The following year, authorities accused the Tūhoe of sheltering Kereopa Te Rau, a Hauhau wanted for killing and beheading Carl Sylvius Völkner, a missionary of the Church Mission Society, in what was called the Völkner incident. Initially, the Tūhoe had cooperated in tracking down the Hauhau leader and had taken him prisoner. The Tūhoe tried to use him as a bargaining chip, but the government demanded Te Rau be handed over for trial. After the Tūhoe released him, Te Rau hid in Te Urewera. As punishment, in 1866, the government confiscated 5,700 ha (14,000 acres) or about 7% of Tūhoe land on its northern coastal border. The confiscated Tūhoe land adjoined the land confiscated from Bay of Plenty rebels after the Battle of Gate Pā. The Crown took the Tūhoe's only substantial flat, fertile land, which also provided their only access to the coast for kai moana (seafood). The Tūhoe people retained only interior, more difficult-to-farm land, setting the scene for later famines.

In 1868, Tūhoe sheltered the Māori leader Te Kooti, a fugitive who had escaped from imprisonment on the Chatham Islands. Te Kooti arrived in the area with a large group of escaped convicts, fully armed with modern weapons he had stolen from the ship he had hijacked. It is doubtful that the Tūhoe could have resisted his demands for sanctuary. Some Tūhoe joined his armed Ringatū band, but other Tūhoe told government forces of Te Kooti's whereabouts. Some joined the armed forces to hunt him down. Government forces punished those Tūhoe who supported Te Kooti during the manhunt. Te Ara, the Online Encyclopedia of New Zealand, notes:

Old enemies of Tūhoe fought on the side of the government; they carried out most of the raids into Te Urewera during a prolonged and destructive search between 1869 and 1872. In a policy aimed at turning the tribe away from Te Kooti, a scorched earth campaign was unleashed against Tūhoe; people were imprisoned and killed, their cultivations and homes destroyed, and stock killed or runoff. Through starvation, deprivation and atrocities at the hands of the government’s Māori forces, Tūhoe submitted to the Crown.

Te Kooti escaped to the King Country, and after the events surrounding the hunt for him, the Tūhoe isolated themselves, closing off access to their lands by refusing to sell, lease or survey them, and blocking the building of roads.

Twenty years later, Te Urewera leaders, Premier Richard Seddon, and Native Affairs Minister Timi (James) Carroll negotiated the 1896 Urewera District Native Reserve Act (UDNR). It provided for Tūhoe self-government through a General Committee and local committees, with the Māori Land Court excluded and titles determined instead by a commission comprising two Pākehā and five Tūhoe commissioners. However the Crown, through a mixture of ineptitude and bad faith, "totally failed to give effect to its promises in the UDNR Act; failed to act fairly, reasonably, and honourably ... and failed to protect the Treaty rights of all the peoples of Te Urewera".

=== 1916 police raid ===
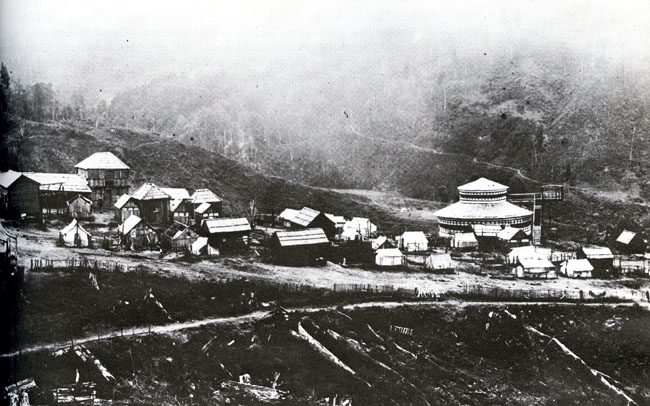
The settlement of Maungapōhatu in 1908

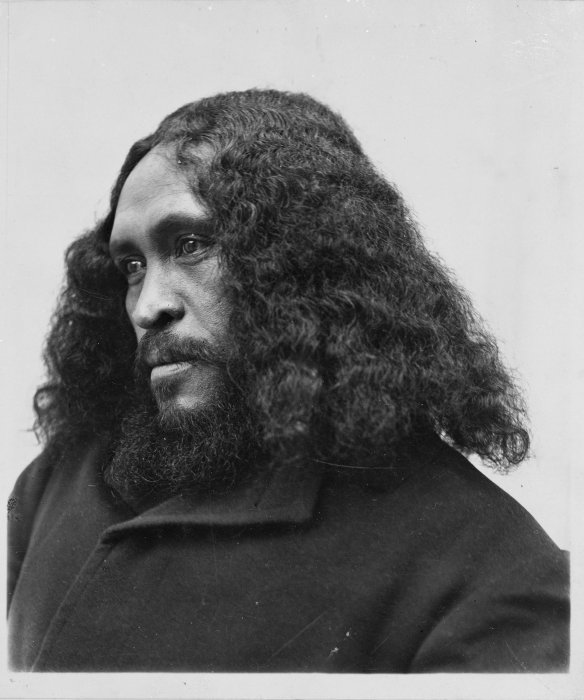
Tūhoe prophet Rua Kēnana in 1908

Historian James Belich describes Te Urewera as one of the last zones of Māori autonomy, and the scene of the last case of armed Māori resistance: the 1916 New Zealand Police raid to arrest the Tūhoe prophet, Rua Kēnana Hepetipa.

On 2 April 1916 a 70-strong, and heavily armed, police party arrived at Maungapōhatu to arrest him for sedition. Because Rua's village was so remote, the police had to take a lot of equipment and camped on the way. They moved like a small army with wagons and pack-horses, and included The New Zealand Herald photographer Arthur Breckon. So as not to alert Maungapōhatu residents of their intention to spring an attack, they did not wear their police uniforms until just before the raid. They were convinced that when they reached the village there would be an ambush.

There was no violent resistance from Rua personally, but his supporters fought a half-hour gun battle with the police in which two Māori, including Rua's son Toko, were killed and two wounded. Four constables were also wounded. Rua was arrested and transported to Rotorua, his hair and beard removed. From Rotorua, with six other Māori prisoners including Whatu, Rua was transferred to Auckland and sent directly to Mount Eden prison. Rua was held, at first, on a nine months sentence imposed for the 1915 charges and now increased by his default of fines. After a trial on sedition which lasted 47 days, New Zealand's longest until 1977, he was found not guilty; but sentenced to one year's imprisonment for resisting the police.

=== 20th century ===
Significant European penetration did not occur in Te Urewera until the 20th century. A road was built by the government from Rotorua to Ruatāhuna in 1901 to end the isolation of Tūhoe by opening up the first motor road.

The Tūhoe did eventually realise, especially in the Great Depression, that to develop their local economy they needed good roads to the outside world. They donated some land for road rights of way. As early as 1906, Tūhoe had given land for roads and offered free labour to assist in the construction, but building arterial roads in Te Urewera was a low government priority. In the early 1900s traces of gold were found in Te Urewera, and Rua Te Kanana tried to sell illegal mining rights to raise money. At the same time Rua wished to sell very large areas of land to the government to raise funds for his new Jerusalem, but despite having a petition signed by every Tūhoe adult, the government insisted that he stick to the law.

In the 1920s Gordon Coates, Minister of Public Works, went to the area to check its suitability for a railway and to discuss roads. The land was very steep, with the Poverty Bay Herald describing the gradient as "one in nothing". Coates knew that by this time, Tūhoe refused to make any contribution to the road at all. The mountainous terrain was daunting for farming. Tūhoe could not accumulate any capital to develop land they had cleared from 1907. Instead they sold all their sheep and cattle to pay for legal costs. These debts were not paid until 1931.

In the early 1930s the government helped develop Tūhoe land at both Ruatoki and Ruatāhuna. It understood that, like many New Zealanders in the Great Depression, Tūhoe was experiencing hard times. In 1934 a teacher wrote that "they have no money apart from what is given by government as Family Allowances and Old Age Pensions". A 1936 report noted that land development at Maungapōhatu Mountain (a Ringatū stronghold) "would be a social success if undertaken". The report pointed out that the venture would probably fail if Tūhoe were required to pay back both the interest and the capital. In 1937, after several other studies, the government decided that it was uneconomic to invest in roads or settlements. By this time, the isolated Maungapōhatu settlement had collapsed anyway.

=== Late 20th and early 21st century ===
The Tūhoe population was always small and living conditions were poor. School records from the 1920s and 1930s show very high death rates, especially of children. 75% of those who died were people under 25. The main causes of death were infectious diseases, such as influenza, gastroenteritis, typhoid fever and whooping cough. Between 1924 and 1936, the Depression period, 57 people died in a community of 30 families.

From the late 1990s, some Tūhoe started identifying as the Tūhoe nation, and emphasising widespread Tūhoe rejection of what they call Pākehā rule. It has been argued that because no Tūhoe or Tūhoe representative ever signed the Treaty of Waitangi, they never gave up their sovereignty.

Tūhoe and other local iwi brought the Te Urewera claim to the Waitangi Tribunal in 2002, with submissions accepted up until 2005.

==== 2007 police raid ====
There was a major armed-police raid in Te Urewera on 15 October 2007 amid claims that some Tūhoe had run terrorist training-camps there. Roadblocks were set up between Ruatoki and Tāneatua by armed police, who searched and questioned everyone who passed through, including a school bus, and locals said they felt intimidated.

No terrorism charges were laid, and Police Commissioner Howard Broad later publicly apologised for the actions of his officers during the raid, acknowledging they had set back relations between police and the Tūhoe people: "We regret the hurt and stress caused to the community of Ruatoki and we will seek an appropriate way to repair the damage done to police-Maori relations. History tells us that episodes such as this can and do take decades to heal." A 2013 IPCA review found "...police searches, vehicle stops, roadblocks and photographs taken in Tuhoe country on October 15, 2007, unlawful, unjustified and unreasonable."

==== Treaty of Waitangi claim settlement ====
A final settlement was signed in June 2013, after being ratified by all Tūhoe members. Under the deal, Tūhoe received financial, commercial and cultural redress valued at approximately $170 million; an historical account and Crown apology; and the co-governance of a new legal entity, Te Urewera. It was put into law by the passing of the Tūhoe Claims Settlement Act 2014.

== Organisation ==
The representative organisation of the iwi is Tūhoe – Te Uru Taumatua. This is a common law trust, with a board consisting of seven board members, appointed from four local organisations, referred to as Tribals or Taraipara (short for Tūhoe Tribal Executive Committees). As of 2025 its chair was Tamati Kruger and its CEO was Kirsti Luke. The organisation represents the iwi for the purposes of the Resource Management Act 1991 and the Māori Fisheries Act 2004, and is the post-settlement entity responsible for the iwi's interests under both the Central North Island Forests Land Collective Settlement 2008 and the Tūhoe Claims Settlement Act 2014. The organisation governs the Tūhoe Trust Fund, which holds the iwi's taonga and assets. This fund is managed by an independent investment committee.

Tūhoe - Te Uru Taumatua is divided into four departments:

- Anamata - Tūhoe Future's is responsible for long-term planning.
- Ōnukurani - The Tūhoe Biosphere is responsible for managing the iwi's land, rivers, forests.
- Iwi - Tūhoe People is responsible for social strategy, policy and investment. It also maintains relationships with members of the iwi who live outside the tribal lands.
- Whairawa - Tūhoe Infrastructure and Resources is responsible for economic development.

It also oversees or has a stake in three major subsidiary entities:

- Tūhoe Charitable Trust, a registered charitable trust wholly owned by Tūhoe – Te Uru Taumatua, which is responsible for distributing benefits received by the iwi to its individual members.
- Central North Island (CNI) Iwi Holdings, established under the Central North Island Forests Land Collective Settlement 2008, is an asset holding company which manages iwi-owned land in the Kaingaroa Forest. Tūhoe is one of eight iwi who are equal shareholders in the company and each appoint two members of the board of directors.
- Tūhoe Fisheries Quota Limited (TFQL), established under the Māori Fisheries Act 2004, which manages the iwi's portion of the fishing quota and income received from Aotearoa Fisheries Ltd.

The board was responsible for appointing the initial Tūhoe representatives on the Te Urewera Board, which is responsible for speaking for Te Urewera, which is a legal entity that owns itself under the Te Urewera Act 2014.

=== Tribals ===
The territory of the iwi is divided into four Tribals or Taraipara (short for Tūhoe Tribal Executive Committees). These are non-registered entities which were established in the mid-twentieth century. Each Tribal meets monthly and consists of two delegates from each marae within their region, selected by the individual hapū. They each appoint a chair, secretary, and treasurer for a three-year term. For the marae and hapū in their respective regions, they serve as the formal venue for decision making, the collective voice, the contact point for external stakeholders, and a forum for matters relating to thee iwi's reo and tikanga (language and traditional knowledge). They are representative organisations; authority and mana remain with the individual marae and hapū. Since 2011, they also serve as the interface between the individual hapū and marae of the iwi and Tūhoe – Te Uru Taumatua.

The four Tribals are:

- Tūhoe Manawarū Tribal or Ruatāhuna, established in the 1970s, which consists of 22 delegates from 11 marae on the upper reaches of the Whakatāne River, around Ruatāhuna in the central part of Tūhoe territory.
- Te Taraipara ō Rūātoki Tribal, formerly known as Western Tūhoe Tribal Executive Committee and Te Kōpu, established in the 1950s, which consists of 24 delegates from 12 marae in the northwestern part of Tūhoe territory, around Ruatoki.
- Te Waimana Kaaku Tribal, which consists of 24 delegates from 12 marae in the northern part of Tūhoe territory, around Waimana. Waimana is a sacred spring, where chiefs used to gather for decision-making meetings. Kaaku is a term referring to the way kūmara vine tendrils grow together. The tribal claims a particular link to Hapekituarangi and his sons Tamarau and Rāwaho of Te Hapū-oneone, who played a key role in the cultivation of kūmara.
- Waikaremoana Tribal, established in 2007, which consists of eight delegates from four maraearound Lake Waikaremoana, in the southern part of Tūhoe territory.

=== Hapū and marae ===
Tūhoe consists of 39 marae, some of which are shared by multiple hapū. As of 2011, there are 65 hapū within Tūhoe, but the number has varied over time as hapū lapse, split or reform.

Marae	Wharenui	Hapū	Tribal
Kākānui (Tīpapa)	Kākahutāpiki	Ngāti Kākahutāpiki	Ruatāhuna
Mātaatua	Te Whaia a Te Motu	Te Urewera	Ruatāhuna
Ōhaua o te rangi	Te Poho-o-Pōtiki	Ngāti Rongo	Ruatāhuna
Ōpūtao	Te Ngawari	Ngāti Tāwhaki	Ruatāhuna
Ōtekura (attached to Kākānui)	Te Ōhāki	Ngāti Kākahutāpiki; Tamakaimoana	Ruatāhuna
Pāpueru	Te Whatu o Te Kanohi	Ngāti Tāwhaki	Ruatāhuna
Tātāhoata	Te Tapuae	Ngāi Te Riu	Ruatāhuna
Te Umuroa	Te Poho-o-Parahaki	Ngāti Manunui	Ruatāhuna
Uwhiārae	Te Paena	Ngāi Te Paena	Ruatāhuna
Te Waiiti	Te Poho o Kurī Kino	Ngāti Kurī Kino; Tamakaimoana	Ruatāhuna
Hui te Raniora	Hui te Raniora	Ngāti Rongo	Rūātoki
Nāhina	Tāwhaki	Ngāti Tāwhaki	Rūātoki
Ōhotu	Pōtiki Tiketike	Te Whānau a Pani	Rūātoki
Ōtenuku	Tahatu o Te Ao	Ngāti Kōura	Rūātoki
Ōwhakatoro (Te Mauku)	Tā Apirana Turupa Ngata	Ngāti Rongo	Rūātoki
Te Papakāina	Kōura-kino	Ngāti Kōura	Rūātoki
Te Pūtere	Te Poho o Ranimonoa	Ngāti Mura	Rūātoki
Te Rewarewa	Te Rangimoaho; Kuramihirangi	Te Māhurehure	Rūātoki
Tauarau	Rongokarae	Ngāti Rongo	Rūātoki
Te Tōtara	Te Puhi o Mātaatua	Te Urewera	Rūātoki
Waikirikiri	Toi-kai-rākau	Hāmua; Ngāti Mura	Rūātoki
Matahī	Te Huinga o te Kura	Ngāi Tamatuhirae	Te Waimana
Ōmuriwaka	Te Tātua o Hape ki Tūārangi	Ngai Tamatuhirae	Te Waimana
Piripari	Tamakaimoana	Ngāi Tātua; Tamakaimoana	Te Waimana
Pouāhīnau	Tūranga Pikitoi	Tūranga Pikitoi	Te Waimana
Rāhiri	Rāhiri ō te Rangi	Ngāti Rere	Te Waimana
Rāroa	Te Poho ō Tānemoeahi	Tamaruarangi	Te Waimana
Tanatana	Te Poho ō Tuhoe	Ngāti Rere	Te Waimana
Tātaiāhape	Takutai ō Terangi	Ngāti Raka	Te Waimana
Tauanui	Te Poho ō Tamatea	Te Whakatāne	Te Waimana
Tāwhana	Ngā Tau E Maha	Ngā Maihi	Te Waimana
Tuapō	Te Ao Hou	Tamakaimoana	Te Waimana
Whakarae (Te Kaawa)	Toi te Huatahi	Te Whakatāne; Ngāi Tama	Te Waimana
Te Kūhā Tārewa	Hinekura Wāhi	Ngāti Hinekura; Ngāti Ruapani	Waikaremoana
Ngātapa		Te Whānau a Eria	Waikaremoana
Te Pūtere	Pareroa	Ngāi Tarapāraoa	Waikaremoana
Waimako	Te Poho-o-Tūhoe Pōtiki	Te Whānau Pani	Waikaremoana
Te Māpou	Tāne nui ā Rangi	Tamakaimoana	(Maungapōhatu)
Waiōhau	Tama ki Hikurangi	Ngāti Haka; Patuheuheu	(Waiōhau)

==== Ngāti Koura ====
Ngāti Koura is a hapū (subtribe) in the eastern Bay of Plenty on North Island. Two marae are traditionally associated with Ngāti Koura: Otenuku and Te Papakainga. Otenuku marae is the site of Te Tapuwae, a cemetery in which many Tūhoe chiefs are buried.

== Notable people ==
- Makurata Paitini, weaver
- Aniwaniwa Tait-Jones, professional basketball player
