= Te Ūpokorehe =

Māori iwi (tribe) in Aotearoa (New Zealand)

- Iwi (tribe) in Māoridom
- Rohe (region): Bay of Plenty
- Waka (canoe): Arautauta, Mātaatua, Nukutere

Te Ūpokorehe is a Māori iwi (tribal group) located in the eastern Bay of Plenty region of New Zealand. There is currently a dispute over whether it is a hapū (sub-tribe) of Whakatōhea or an iwi (tribe) in its own right.

The rohe (tribal area) of Te Ūpokorehe extends from Maraetotara (Ōhope) in the west to the middle of Waioweka River (Ōpōtiki) in the east, within the boundaries of Ōpōtiki District and Whakatāne District.

== History ==
Te Ūpokorehe was included as a hapū within Whakatōhea when the Whakatōhea Māori Trust Board was established in 1952. Hapū members were considered part of Whakatōhea, an iwi tracing its heritage back to ancestors arriving on the waka (migration canoes) Te Arautauta, Nukutere and Mātaatua.

A schism emerged over time between members of the tribe who considered themselves part of Whakatōhea and those who did not. As of July 2022, more than 700 people have signed a petition seeking to remove Te Ūpokorehe from the Whakatōhea Treaty of Waitangi settlement, including whānau at Roimata Marae, claiming it would leave the tribe worse off. However, more than 1700 Ūpokorehe people remained registered with Te Whakatōhea Māori Trust Board. Some told media they disagreed with the petition and wanted to remain part of the Whakatōhea settlement.

== Marae ==
Te Ūpokorehe includes the following marae groupings:

Name	Maunga (mountain)	Te Awa (river)	Moana (harbour/lake)	Marae (meeting place)	Whare Tīpuna (meeting house)	Wharekai (dining hall)
Kutarere	Tirotirowhitu	Kakaho	n/a	Kutarere Marae	Te Poho o Tamaterangi	Ani-i-waho
Maromahue	Pukenui-o-raho	Waiotahe	n/a	Maromahue Marae	Te Poho o Kahungunu	Pouwharekura
Roimata	Hiwarau	Te Karaka	Tairongo	Roimata Marae	Te Ao Marama	Te umutao Noa a Tairongo

== Governance ==
The Whakatōhea Māori Trust Board was established in 1952 to administer the assets of Whakatōhea, and provides members with education, health services and training in various commercial fields. It is a charitable trust governed by two representatives from each of the six hapū, and based in Ōpōtiki. It is also accountable to the Minister of Māori Affairs and is governed by the Māori Trust Boards Act. The trust represents the tribe's fisheries interest under the Māori Fisheries Act 2004, and its aquaculture interests under the Māori Commercial Aquaculture Claims Settlement Act 2004. It represents the tribe during consultation on resource consent applications under the Resource Management Act 1991.

The Whakatōhea Pre-Settlement Claims Trust represents Whakatōhea during Treaty of Waitangi settlement negotiations. The New Zealand Government recognised the trust's mandate to represent Whakatōhea, including Te Ūpokorehe, with an Agreement in Principle signed with the Crown on 18 August 2017. The trust is governed by one trustee elected from each of six hapū, one trustee appointed from each of eight marae, and an additional trustee appointed by Whakatōhea Māori Trust Board. The trust is administered by the same staff as the trust board, in the same offices in Ōpōtiki.

Whānau of Roimata Marae say they aren't represented on the trusts and the trusts cannot act on their behalf.

The tribal area of Te Ūpokorehe is located within the boundaries of Ōpōtiki District Council, Whakatāne District Council and Bay of Plenty Regional Council.

== Media ==
Pan-tribal iwi station Sea 92FM broadcasts to members of Te Ūpokorehe and Whakatōhea, as well as Ngāitai and Te Whānau-ā-Apanui, in the Ōpōtiki area. It is operated by pan-tribal service provider Whakaatu Whanaunga Trust, and is available on 92.0 FM. It operates the low-power Opotiki 88.1 FM, geared towards a young demographic.

== See also ==
- List of Māori iwi
