= Pōtiki-tiketike =

Pōtiki-tiketike, also known as Pōtiki I and Pōtiki-noho-pā, is the legendary original ancestor of the Ngāi Tūhoe iwi of New Zealand.

== Life ==
Pōtiki was the son of Te Maunga ("the mountain"), a spirit who lived in the sky and was descended from the sky god Ranginui, and Hine-pukohu-rangi ("maiden of the misty sky"), who according to myth was the goddess of mist and fog and identical with the goddess Tairi-a-kohu. She tempted Te Maunga down to earth at Onini, a spot near Ruatāhuna, where there was once a growth of tapu flax which marked the spot. Pōtiki, who seems to have lived some time before Toi-te-huatahi, went on to be the original ancestor of Ngāi Tūhoe. They were originally called Ngā Pōtiki in his honour and are still known poetically as "the Children of the Mist" on account of their descent from Hine-pukohu-rangi.

He had a single son, Tu-houhi, who had a single son Tane-te-hohu-rangi, who had a single son, Te Rangi-tiri-ao, who had two children:

- Puhou

- Pou-te-aniwaniwa

- Teatea

- Romairira, ancestor of the hapū Te Hokowhitu pakira a Romairira

- Tama-urupa

- Rangimonoa, who was the leader of Ngā Pōtiki when Tawhaki led people from the Mātaatua canoe into the region.
- Tongaraunui, who married Awatope

- Te Aotawhena

- Rakei-nui

- Tama-ipunoa

- Te Atatau

- Hine-ahu-one or Puha-rau-nui, who married Taneatua, one of the sailors on the Mātaatua and brother of its captain, Toroa.

- Paewhiti, who married Tamatea-ki-te-huatahi, son of Toroa's sister Wairaka:

- Tūhoe Pōtiki, eponymous ancestor of Ngāi Tūhoe.

- Rakei-ora
- Rakei-hakoa
- Rakei-hakeke
- Pōtiki-hakahaka

The descendants of Pōtiki-tiketike called themselves the fort dwellers and considered themselves to be more prestigious than the descendants of Potiki-hakahaka, whom they called Potiki-tahiti-kiore ("rat-snaring Potiki").

== Bibliography ==
- Best, Elsdon (1914). "Tuhoe. The Children of the Mist. III". The Journal of the Polynesian Society. 23 (1(89)): 38–54. ISSN 0032-4000. JSTOR 20701060.
