= Statue of Wairaka =

Statue in New Zealand

The Lady on the Rock
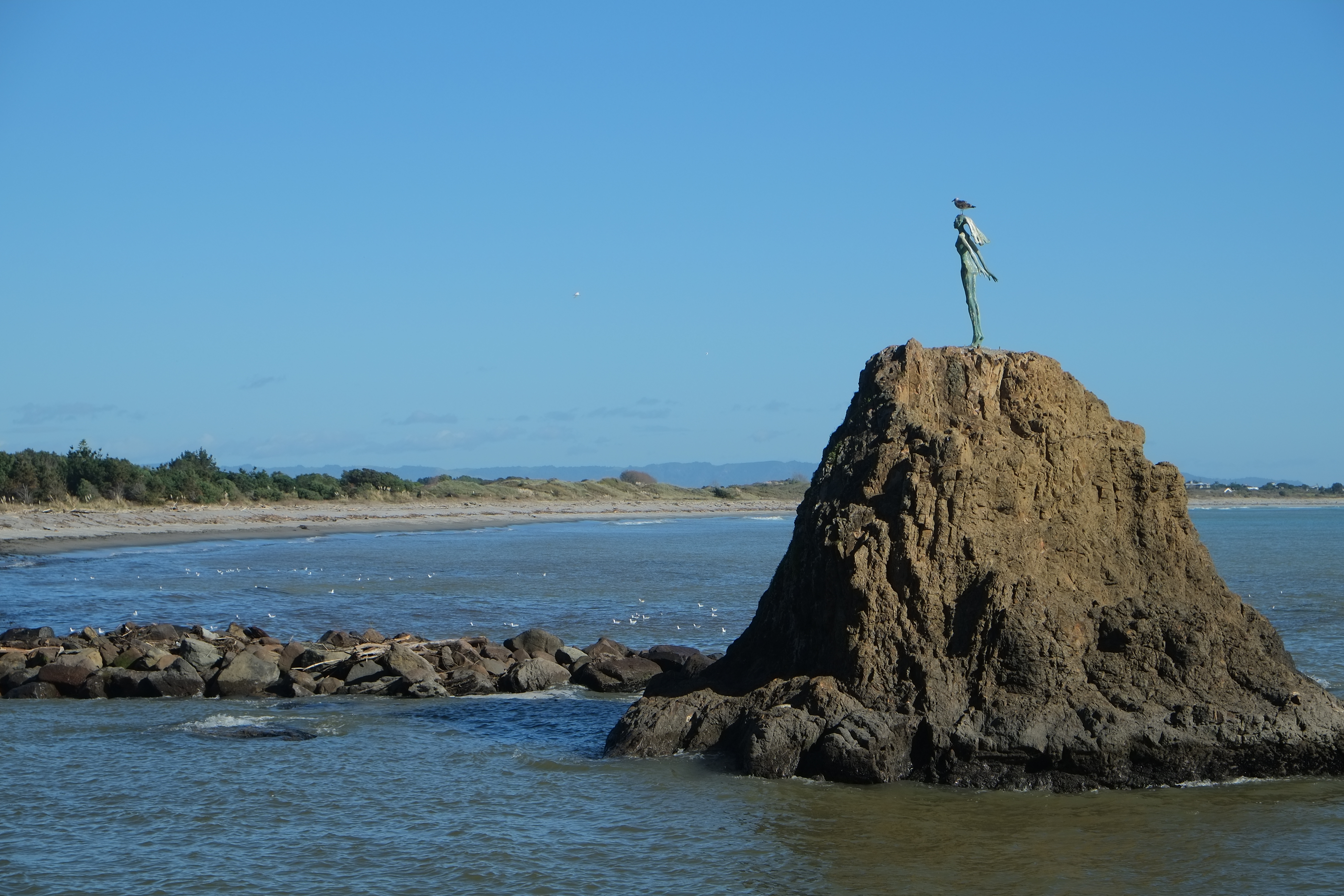
- Artist: Jim Allen
- Year: 1965
- Type: Bronze
- Location: Whakatāne Heads, New Zealand

The Statue of Wairaka (also known as The Lady on the Rock) is located at Whakatāne Heads in Whakatāne, New Zealand.

Wairaka was the daughter of Toroa, the captain and navigator of the Mātaatua waka (canoe) which travelled from Hawaiki to present-day New Zealand. When the Mātaatua first arrived in the Whakatāne region, the men left the women alone in the canoe while they went ashore. The canoe started to drift back to sea, and although women were forbidden from handling a canoe, Wairaka picked up a paddle and led the women to paddle the canoe back to shore. As she did so, she called out "Kia Whakatāne au i ahau’ – I will act the part of a man."

The statue was commissioned by Sir William Sullivan, a former mayor of Whakatāne, following his wife Lady Sullivan's death in 1963. He wanted the statue as both a memorial to his wife and as a symbol of the bond between all citizens of the Whakatāne District. Sullivan chose Jim Allen, senior lecturer of Elam School of Fine Arts in Auckland, to produce the piece. The statue was installed on Turuturu-Roimata rock in 1965.

The statue has been vandalised on a number of occasions, including in 2007 when it was painted white and yellow.
