= Toroa (Mātaatua) =

Toroa was the captain of the Mātaatua canoe, during the migration of the Māori people to New Zealand, around 1400, according to Māori traditions of the Bay of Plenty region. He is considered the founding ancestor of the Mātaatua Māori of the Bay of Plenty, namely the iwi (tribes) of Ngāi Te Rangi, Ngāi Tūhoe, Ngāti Awa, Ngāti Pūkenga, Te Whānau-ā-Apanui.

== Life ==
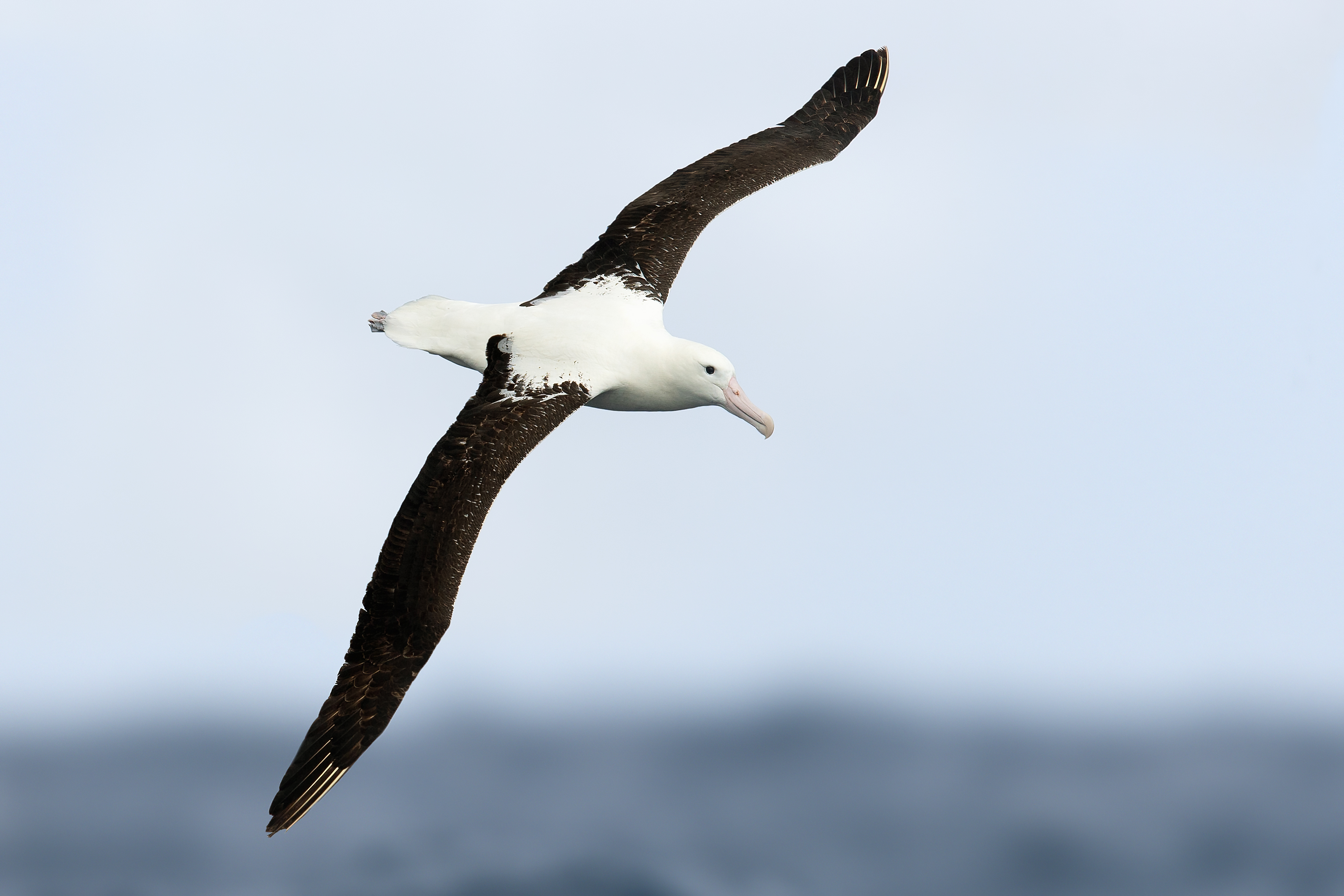
A royal albatross (Māori language: Toroa)

Toroa was born in Hawaiki, the ancestral homeland of the Māori people. His father Irakewa and his mother Wekanui were both descendants of Toi-te-huatahi, He had two full siblings: a brother Puhi, who was the ancestor of Ngapuhi, and a sister Muriwai, who was the ancestor of Te Whakatōhea. He also had a half-brother, Tāneatua, who was an ancestor of Tūhoe and Ngāti Pūkenga. His name is the Māori name for the royal albatross.

=== Journey to New Zealand ===
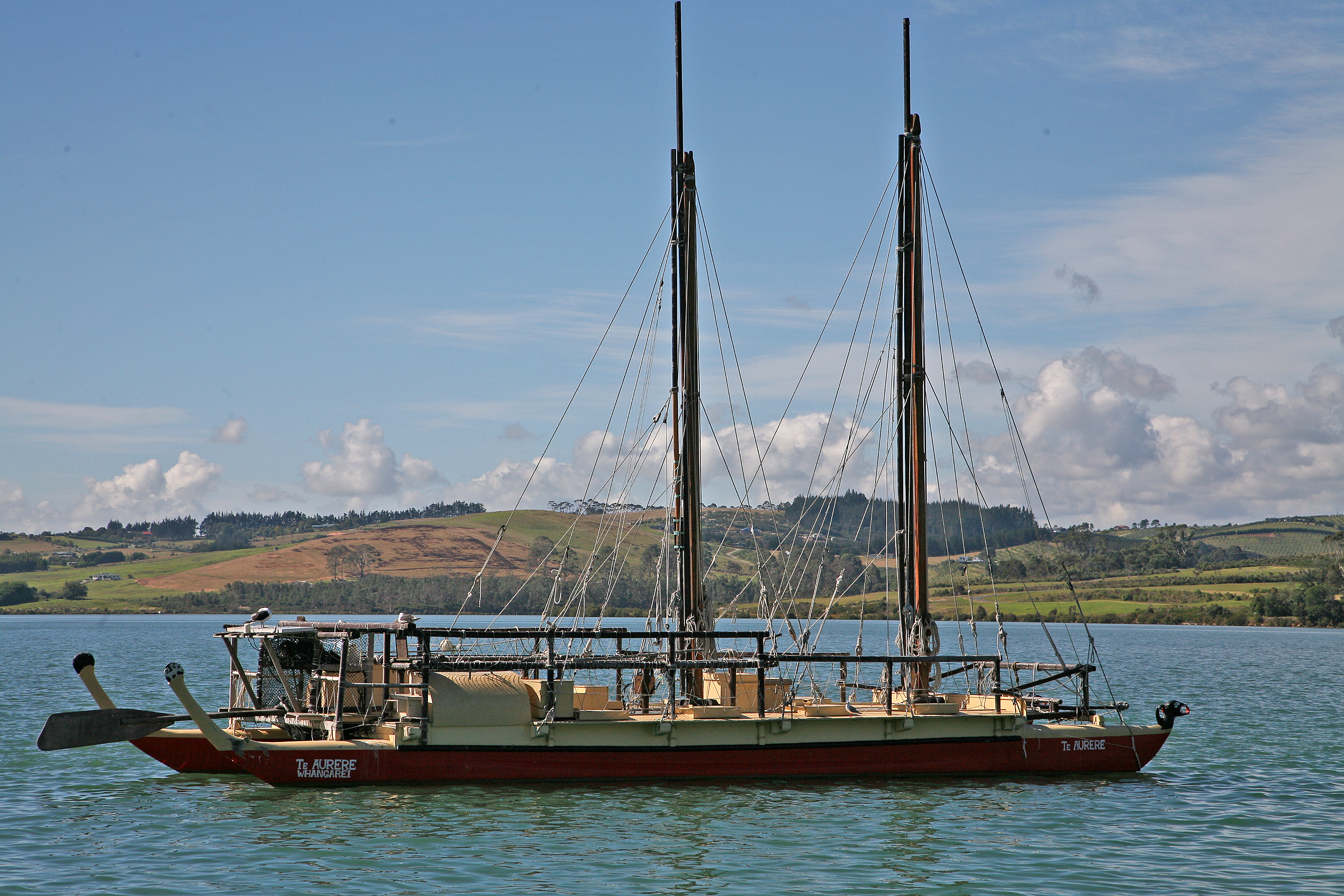
Te Aurere, a modern reconstruction of a sea-going waka (canoe)

The canoe Mātaatua had been built at the command of Irakewa. All traditions agree that he told the children to claim and settle at the Wairere Falls and Te Ana o Muriwai cave above Whakatane. The traditions differ on why he did this. According to a Ngāti Awa source reported to Elsdon Best, he had seen the place in a dream. According to a Ngāti Tūwharetoa account recorded by John Te Herekiekie Grace, Irakewa had previously travelled to New Zealand and had met Kiwa, the mother of Tāneatua, at Whakatane. Toroa was selected as the ship's captain, while his half-brother Tāneatua was made the tohunga.

The canoe stopped en route from Hawaiki at Rarotonga and Rangitahua in the Kermadec Islands, where it encountered the Aotea Kurahaupō. As they were departing, a storm forced two members of Kurahaupō's crew, Te Moungaroa and Turu, to join the Mātaatua. John Te Herekiekie Grace records a karakia ('incantation') sung by Toroa during the voyage to keep the hull intact in the face of the stormy seas, which begins, tutapa, tutapa, tutapa mai kawa, ko te kawa nui, ko te kawa roa ("recite, recite, recite the ritual, the great ritual, the long ritual").

The Mātaatua landed at Whangara on the East Cape of New Zealand, along with the Tokomaru and Te Moungaroa and Turu chose to settle there, marking their decision by constructing a tuahu altar. Toroa took the Mātaatua west to Whangaparāoa River and then Tauranga. At this point he turned back and followed the coast east. When the canoe passed the mouth of the Tarawera and Rangitaiki Rivers, Toroa's daughter Wairaka cried out Aue! He atua kei uta ra! (Oh! There are gods on these shores"), from which the mouth of the river came to be known as Te Awa o te Atua. Finally, they reached Whakatāne, where the crew disembarked.

=== Conflict between Toroa and Puhi ===
When it came time to carry out the rituals connected to the sowing the kūmara, there was conflict. Irakewa had said that Toroa should perform the karakia (incantations) connected with the sowing, but his younger brother Puhi attempted to perform the rituals instead. They quarrelled and Tāneatua took Toroa's side. Grace records an angry song sung by Puhi on this occasion, which concludes tangi ana te whakatopatopa o kai, o kai mai he toroa, he taiko ("I hear the planting chants resound, but your food is an albatross and a black petrel"), referring to Toroa and Tāneatua. Calling them food in this way was a grave insult and it is the origin of Puhi's full name, Puhi-kai-ariki (Puhi who eats chiefs). Toroa responded with a planting song, recorded by Grace, which includes the lines E Puhi e! Ngahoro e! Kai tai, kai tai, kai te whakrua koia, e--e (Oh Puhi! You are fallen! You twice drinker of sea water"). In his anger, Puhi took the Mātaatua and left with most of its crew to travel further north. The tribe of Te Whakatōhea, descended from Muriwai, may be named from this event (te waka tohea means "the canoe contended for").

=== Settlement ===
Toroa, Tāneatua, Muriwai, and their immediate families remained in the Bay of Plenty and their descendants intermixed with previously established Māori tribes in the region. Toroa settled at Kaputerangi and built a wharenui called Tupapakurau. His descendants, Ngāti Awa, settled in the area between Ohiwa Harbour and the mouth of the Tarawera River. A proverb refers to the territories of Mātaatua as stretching mai Tikirau ki nga kuri a Wharei ("from Tikirau to the dogs of Wharei").

== Family ==
Toroa married twice. By one wife, Puhourangi, he had a daughter:

- Wairaka, who was an ancestor of Tūhoe and Ngāti Pūkenga, after whom the town of Whakatane in the Bay of Plenty is named.

By his other wife, Kake-Pikitia, he had a son:

- Ruaihonga, a son, who had offspring:

- Tahinga-o-te-rā, who married Mahanga-i-te-rangi

- Awanui-a-rangi, namesake of Ngāti Awa.

== Bibliography ==
- Best, Elsdon (1896). In ancient Maoriland : being notes collected from the descendants of the aboriginal people of the Rangitaiki Valley and the Ure-wera Country and from the Mataatua Tribes : given by members of the Ngati-Manawa, Ngati-Whare, Tuhoe, Ngati-Apa, Ngati-Awa, Ngati-Hamua and Patuheuheu tribes. Rotorua: Hot Lakes Chronicle Office.
- Grace, John Te Herekiekie (1959). Tuwharetoa: The history of the Maori people of the Taupo District. Auckland [N.Z.]: A.H. & A.W. Reed.
- Steedman, J.A.W. (1984). Ngā Ohaaki o ngā Whānau o Tauranga Moana: Māori History and Genealogy of the Bay of Plenty.
- Walker, Ranginui (2004). Ka Whawhai Tonu Matou - Struggle Without End (2nd ed.). Auckland, New Zealand: Penguin Books. p. 47. ISBN 9780143019459.
- Department of Maori Studies (1986). Te whakatuwheratanga o Te Tumu Herenga Waka : 6 Tihema 1986, Poneke, Te Whare Wananga o Wikitoria. Wellington: Victoria University of Wellington.
