= Whangaparāoa (disambiguation) =

Whangaparāoa Peninsula is a peninsula and town near Auckland, New Zealand.

Whangaparāoa may also refer to:

- Whangaparāoa, Bay of Plenty, a locality and bay near Cape Runaway in the eastern Bay of Plenty of New Zealand
- Whangaparāoa Bay, to the north of the Whangaparāoa Peninsula
- Whangaparāoa College, a school on Whangaparāoa Peninsula
- Whangaparāoa Head, a headland at the end of the peninsula
- Whangaparāoa Passage, a channel between the peninsula and Tiritiri Matangi Island
- Whangaparāoa River, a river in the Bay of Plenty which enters Whangaparāoa Bay
