= Gareeb =

Gareeb is a surname and given name. Notable people with the name include:

- Gareeb Stephen Shalfoon (1904–1953), New Zealand dance band musician and storekeeper
- Nabeel Gareeb (fl. 2002), Pakistani-American businessman
