= Shalfoon =

Shalfoon is a surname. Notable people with the surname include:

- Antonio Shalfoon (born 1997), New Zealand rugby union player
- Gareeb Stephen Shalfoon (1904–1953), New Zealand dance band musician and storekeeper
