= Wairaka (Mātaatua) =

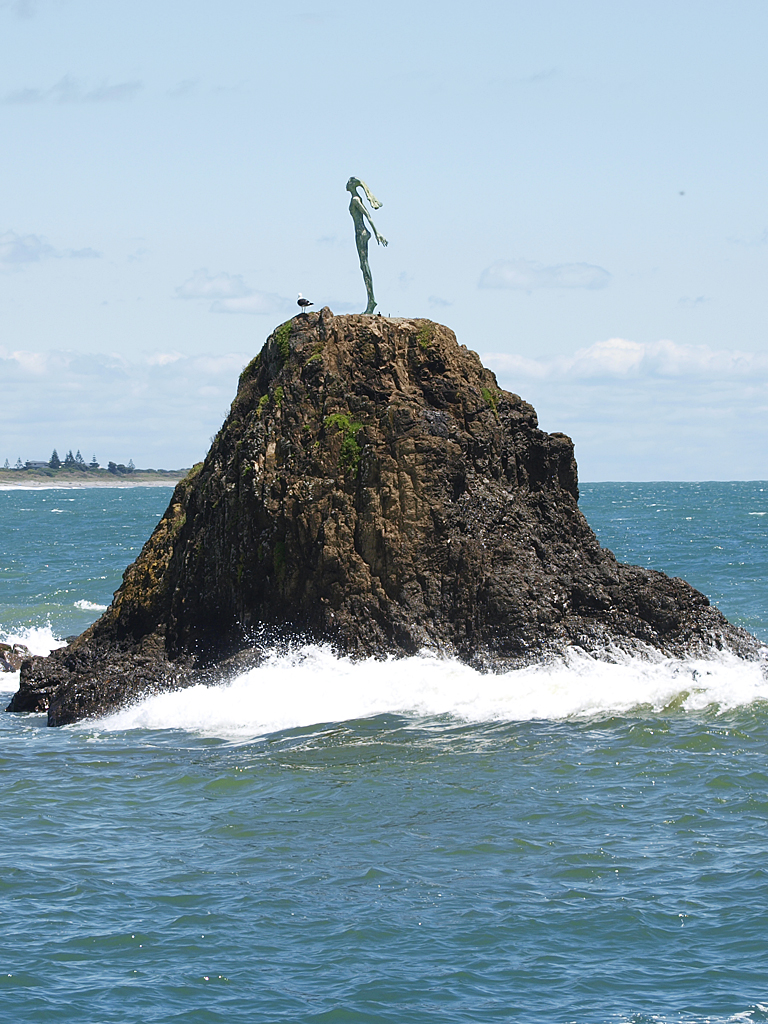
Modern Statue of Wairaka at Whakatāne

Wairaka was a Māori rangatira (chief) in the Bay of Plenty region and an ancestor of the Tūhoe and Ngāti Pūkenga iwi (tribes). She accompanied her father from Hawaiki on the Mātaatua canoe and was responsible for naming Te Awa o te Atua and Whakatāne.

== Life ==
Wairaka was the daughter of Toroa and Puhourangi. She had one half-brother, Ruaihonga (the ancestor of Ngāti Awa).

=== Journey to New Zealand ===
Wairaka joined her father and other family members on the Mātaatua canoe, which travelled from Hawaiki to New Zealand via at Rarotonga and Rangitahua. The Mātaatua landed at Whangara on the East Cape of New Zealand, along with the Tokomaru and Te Moungaroa and Turu chose to settle there, marking their decision by constructing a tuahu altar. Toroa took the Mātaatua west to Whangaparāoa River and then Tauranga. At this point he turned back and followed the coast east. When the canoe passed the mouth of the Tarawera and Rangitaiki Rivers, Toroa's daughter Wairaka cried out Aue! He atua kei uta ra! (Oh! There are gods on these shores"), from which the mouth of the river came to be known as Te Awa o te Atua. Finally, they reached Whakatāne, where the crew disembarked.

=== Naming of Whakatāne ===
When the canoe landed at Kakahoroa, the men of the crew went ashore to visit Toikairakau's pā, Kaputerangi, which was to become their first base. Meanwhile, the women unloaded provisions from the canoe. The tide began to rise and Mātaatua was nearly swept away, but one of the women managed to tie the canoe down, saying as she did it, E whakatāne ahau e a hau ("let me make a man of myself"), from which the area received its modern name, Whakatāne. Ngati Awa and Tuhoe say that this was Waireka, Te Whakatohea that it was Toroa's sister Muriwai.

=== Marriage ===
After the immigrants had settled at Whakatāne, they were visited by travellers from Taranaki. Wairaka watched the visitors dancing and developed an affection for one of the men, Tukaiteuru. After the visitors had gone to sleep she snuck into the room and scratched the face of her beloved. Then she went and told her father to marry her to the man with scratches on his face. However, one of the other visitors, an ugly man called Maiurenui, had noticed how Wairaka had been watching Tukaiteuru and had convinced him to switch sleeping places with him. As a result, Wairaka had inadvertently scratched his face and Toroa brought Maiurenui back as the bridegroom. "The darkness when Wairaka was deceived" (Po Wairaka e i raru ia e) became proverbial for confusion and deception.

Grace says that Wairaka refused to marry Maiurenui and married one Rangikitua, but that he drowned while out fishing shortly after this. Steedman says that Wairaka was compelled to marry Maiurenui, that he drowned while fishing during her pregnancy, and that she subsequently married Rangikutua.

== Family ==
Wairaka had one son:

- Tamatea-ki-te-huatahi, who married Paewhiti, the daughter of Tāneatua, who was a half-brother of Toroa and thus an uncle of Wairaka

- Ue-i-mua
- Tanemoeahi

- Pūkenga, ancestor of Ngāti Pūkenga

- Uenuku-rauiri, who had a liaison with Rangiwhakaekehau

- Rangiteaorere, ancestor of Ngāti Rangiteaorere

- Tūhoe Potiki, ancestor of Ngāi Tūhoe

== Bibliography ==
- Grace, John Te Herekiekie (1959). Tuwharetoa: The history of the Maori people of the Taupo District. Auckland [N.Z.]: A.H. & A.W. Reed.
- Steedman, J.A.W. (1984). Ngā Ohaaki o ngā Whānau o Tauranga Moana: Māori History and Genealogy of the Bay of Plenty.
- Department of Maori Studies (1986). Te whakatuwheratanga o Te Tumu Herenga Waka : 6 Tihema 1986, Poneke, Te Whare Wananga o Wikitoria. Wellington: Victoria University of Wellington.
