= Ngāti Ira =

Ngāti Ira may refer to:

- Ngāti Ira (Wellington), a tribe that lived in the Wellington region
- A subtribe of Ngāti Porou
- A subtribe of Whakatōhea
