= Kutarere =

Locality in Bay of Plenty, New Zealand

Coordinates: 38.045773°S 177.146313°E

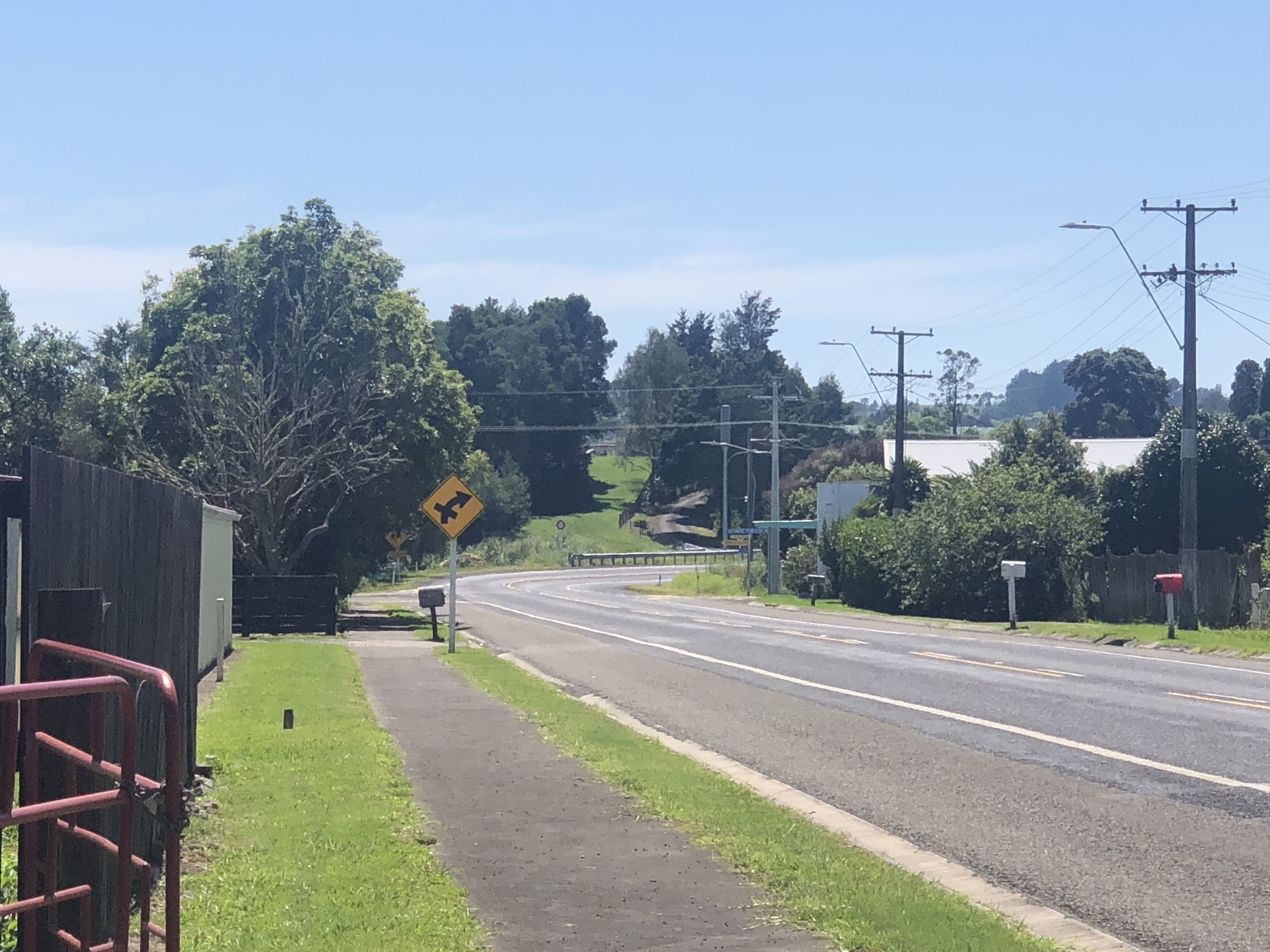
Looking north along State Highway 2 through Kutarere, from outside Kutarere Marae, in February 2023

Kutarere is a community in the Ōpōtiki District and Bay of Plenty Region of New Zealand's North Island, on the coast of the Ōhiwa Harbour.

Following the European settlement of the Ōpōtiki township, Kutarere became a port for incoming goods until October 1959.

A photograph of Kutarere by Brian Brake, taken in the 1980s, is held in the collections in Museum of New Zealand Te Papa Tongarewa.

== History and culture ==
=== Burial controversy ===
In 2007, Tūhoe man James Takamore was buried at the Kutarere cemetery. It sparked a lengthy legal and protest dispute between his partner and immediate family, who wanted him buried in Christchurch, and his wider family and Kutarere elders, who wanted him to remain buried at Kutarere.

In 2011, courts found the wider family had acted illegally in taking the body without the wife's permission. Attempts to disintern the body in 2014 were blocked by protesters. The two parties reached a confidential resolution through mediation in 2015.

The case sparked a wider legal and ethical debate about New Zealand's burial laws.

=== Recent history ===
One person was burnt during a house fire in Kutarere in August 2016.

The town was isolated by flooding and slips, which closed State Highway through the Waimana Gorge, south of the settlement, in April 2017 and July 2018. A tornado went through the area in August 2018.

In May 2019, Ministry for Primary Industries fisheries agents found two men taking far in excess of their legal allowance of pipi. About a quarter of the pipi were too small to eat.

Josie Mortensen, a trustee of the local marae, received a Queen's Service Medal in the 2019 Queen's Birthday Honours, for services to Māori and the arts.

During the 2020 coronavirus lockdown, a sign was erected at the settlement warning people not to stop.

=== Marae ===
Kutarere contains two marae:

- Kutarere Marae and Te Poho o Tamaterangi meeting house is a gathering place for the Tūhoe hapū of Tūranga Pikitoi and the Whakatōhea hapū of Te Ūpokorehe. In October 2020, the Government committed $1,646,820 from the Provincial Growth Fund to upgrade the marae and 5 other local marae, creating 10 jobs.
- Roimata Marae and Te Ao Marama meeting house is a meeting place for the Whakatōhea hapū of Te Ūpokorehe.

== Education ==
Kutarere School is a co-educational state primary school for Year 1 to 8 students, with a roll of 19 as of July 2026.

The Government stepped into the running of the school in 2013, appointing a special adviser from February to November.
