= Charles Shelford =

New Zealand labourer and soldier

Charles Shelford DCM (20 August 1920 – 7 May 1984) was a notable New Zealand labourer, soldier and drain layer. Of Māori descent, he identified with the Ngāti Porou and Te Whakatōhea iwi. He was born in Te Kaha, Bay of Plenty, New Zealand in 1920.
