= Matiu Dickson =

New Zealand Māori teacher, lawyer and academic

Matiu Dickson, (Ngāi Te Rangi, Ngāti Ranginui, Te Whakatōhea, May 1952 – 7 April 2016), was born in Te Puke and grew up in a small Māori community on Matakana Island at the entrance to Tauranga Harbour in New Zealand.

== Biography ==
Matiu Dickson was Associate Dean Māori in "Te Piringa - Faculty of Law" at the University of Waikato. He served there from 1996, when he took a position as a lecturer following years of practicing law. Mr. Dickson held a law degree, as well as a post-graduate diploma from Auckland Teachers' College. He was noted by colleagues for his work in Māori activism.

As part of that activism, Matiu Dickson served four terms on city councils. Additionally, he chaired the Te Runanga o Kirikiriroa Charitable Trust.

Matiu was a keen exponent of kapa haka (traditional performing arts). He served as a judge at the national Te Matatini Kapa Haka Festival.

Matiu died suddenly and unexpectedly during the opening ceremony for the University of Waikato's new Law and Management building.

== Family ==
He is survived by his wife, Helen (married 1983–2016), as well as six children.
