= Waioeka =

Locality in the Bay of Plenty, New Zealand

- Locality
- Interactive map of Waioeka
- Coordinates: 38.083058°S 177.288318°E
- Country: New Zealand
- Region: Bay of Plenty
- Territorial authority: Ōpōtiki District
- Ward: Waioeka-Waiōtahe-Otara Ward
- Electorates: East Cape; Waiariki (Māori)

Government
  - Territorial authority: Ōpōtiki District Council
  - Regional council: Bay of Plenty Regional Council
  - Mayor of Ōpōtiki: David Moore
  - East Cape MP: Dana Kirkpatrick
  - Waiariki MP: Rawiri Waititi

Area
  - Total: 18.39 km^{2} (7.10 sq mi)

Population (2023 Census)
  - Total: 117
  - Density: 6.36/km^{2} (16.5/sq mi)
- Postcode(s): 3197

Waioeka is a rural community in the Ōpōtiki District and Bay of Plenty Region of New Zealand's North Island. Its name was officially changed to Waioweka in 2024. The community is on the east bank of the Waioweka River.

== Demographics ==
Waioeka locality covers 18.39 km^{2} (7.10 sq mi). It is part of the Ōtara-Tirohanga statistical area.

Historical population
Year	Pop.	±% p.a.
2006	141	—
2013	108	−3.74%
2018	117	+1.61%
2023	117	+0.00%

Waioeka had a population of 117 in the 2023 New Zealand census, unchanged since the 2018 census, and an increase of 9 people (8.3%) since the 2013 census. There were 60 males and 57 females in 45 dwellings. 2.6% of people identified as LGBTIQ+. The median age was 35.9 years (compared with 38.1 years nationally). There were 21 people (17.9%) aged under 15 years, 27 (23.1%) aged 15 to 29, 48 (41.0%) aged 30 to 64, and 18 (15.4%) aged 65 or older.

People could identify as more than one ethnicity. The results were 64.1% European (Pākehā); 59.0% Māori; 5.1% Asian; and 2.6% Middle Eastern, Latin American and African New Zealanders (MELAA). English was spoken by 94.9%, Māori by 15.4%, and other languages by 2.6%. The percentage of people born overseas was 15.4, compared with 28.8% nationally.

Religious affiliations were 38.5% Christian, 10.3% Māori religious beliefs, and 2.6% other religions. People who answered that they had no religion were 46.2%, and 2.6% of people did not answer the census question.

Of those at least 15 years old, 18 (18.8%) people had a bachelor's or higher degree, 42 (43.8%) had a post-high school certificate or diploma, and 33 (34.4%) people exclusively held high school qualifications. The median income was $38,500, compared with $41,500 nationally. 6 people (6.2%) earned over $100,000 compared to 12.1% nationally. The employment status of those at least 15 was 54 (56.2%) full-time, 15 (15.6%) part-time, and 3 (3.1%) unemployed.

== Marae ==
The local marae is known variously as Ōpeke Marae, Opekerau Marae or Waioeka Marae. It is the traditional tribal meeting place of the Whakatōhea hapū Ngāti Irapuaia / Ngāti Ira. The meeting house is called Irapuaia.

Waioeka was the location of Tanewhirinaki, at the time one of the largest wharenui ever built. The structure, which was built by Te Kooti for his followers, was completed in the late 1860s.

== Education ==
Te Kura Kaupapa Māori o Waioweka is a co-educational Māori language immersion state primary school for Year 1 to 8 students, with a roll of 67 as of July 2026. The school opened in 1884.

There was a Waioweka/Waioeka Māori School which opened in 1882 or 1883 and was still extant in 1967.
