= Tangimoe Clay =

New Zealand Māori weaver

- Born: 1960 (age 65–66)
- Occupations: Weaver; textile artist; gallery owner

Tangimoe Clay is a New Zealand weaver and textile artist. She is affiliated with the Whakatōhea and Ngāti Ngahere iwi. Her artworks are held by the Auckland Art Gallery Toi o Tāmaki and the Museum of New Zealand Te Papa Tongarewa.

== Biography ==
Clay is a weaver from Ōpōtiki who has exhibited in New Zealand as well as internationally. She became interested in working with flax in the late 1980s. She was taught some weaving skills by Maggie Tai. Clay has artworks in the collections of the Auckland Art Gallery and Te Papa Tongarewa. In 2014 Clay enrolled with Te Wānanga o Aotearoa to study towards a Bachelor of Māori Visual Arts - Maunga Kura Toi. She also owns the Tangata Whenua Gallery in Ōpōtiki where she sells art works produced by herself as well as other Māori artists.

== Honours and awards ==
In 2003 Clay won Best self-employment business award in the Maori businesswomen awards. In 2016 Clay was the recipient of the Molly Morpeth Canaday 3D local Merit award and the Whakatāne Society of Arts and Crafts Local Art Award.

== Exhibits ==
- The Eternal Thread, group exhibition, Pātaka Art + Museum, Porirua, tour of USA (2004), Christchurch Art Gallery Te Puna o Waiwhetu (2007)
- Mataraupo, Te Koputu a te whanga a Toi — Whakatane Library and Exhibition Centre, 9 December 2017 to 4 February 2018.
- The Real Opotiki, Studio One Toi Tū, 2017
