= Jim Allen (artist) =

New Zealand visual artist (1922–2023)

Jim Allen MNZM
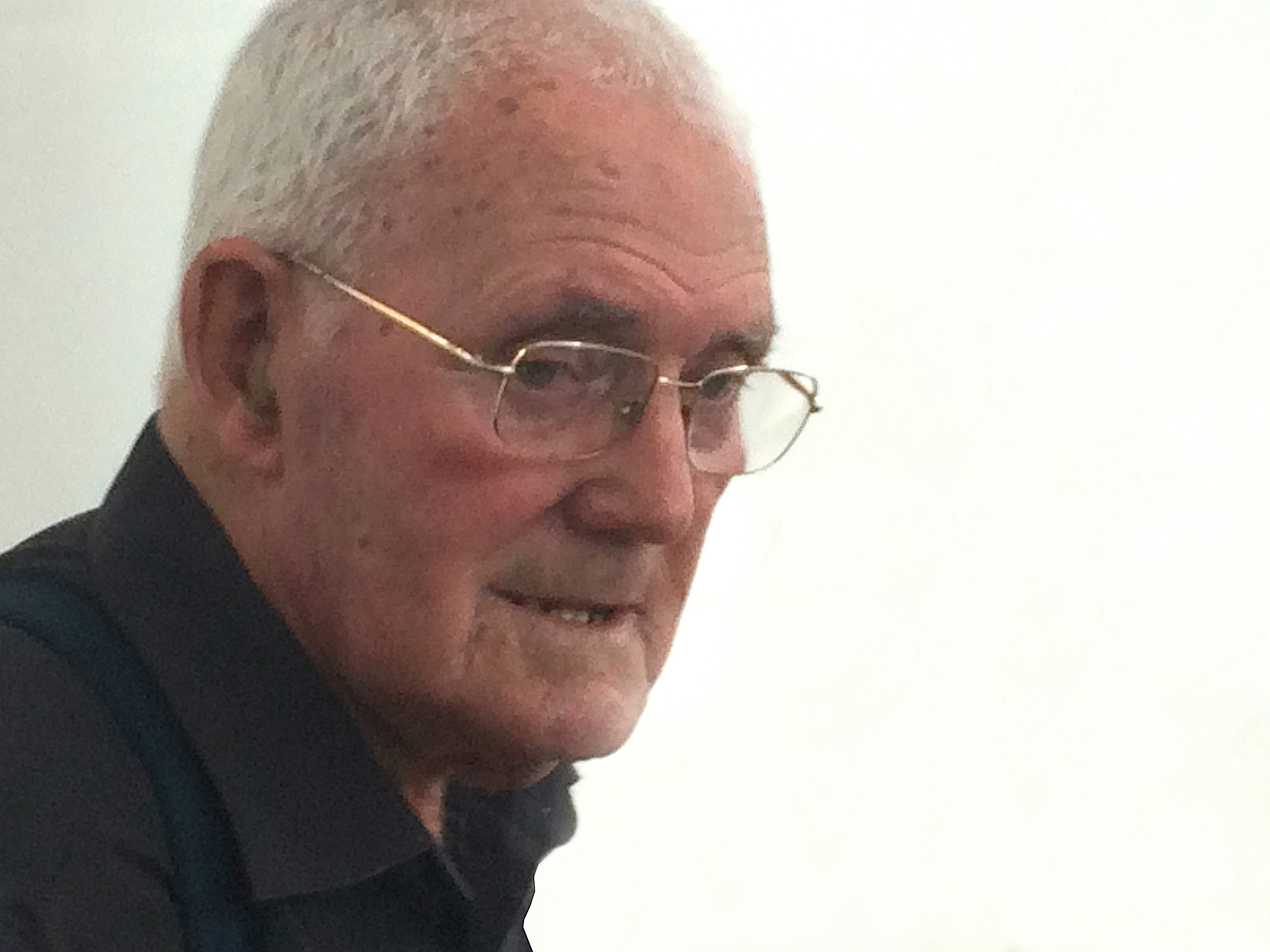
- Jim Allen, 2014
- Born: William Robert Allen; 22 July 1922; Wellington, New Zealand
- Died: 9 June 2023 (aged 100); Auckland, New Zealand
- Awards: Arts Foundation Icon (2015)

William Robert "Jim" Allen MNZM (22 July 1922 – 9 June 2023) was a New Zealand visual and performance artist. In 2015, he was named an Arts Foundation Icon by the Arts Foundation of New Zealand, an honour limited to 20 living people. Allen turned 100 years old in July 2022, and the occasion was marked by the Auckland Art Gallery with an exhibition of his works.

== Early life and family ==
Allen was born in Wellington on 22 July 1922. From 1940 to 1945, he served with the New Zealand Expeditionary Force in North Africa and Italy as a truck driver, motorcycle rider, and machine gunner. After the end of the war, Allen studied at the University of Perugia and at the Instituto d' Arte Florence in Italy in 1945. In 1948, he received a Diploma of Fine Arts from Canterbury University College in Christchurch, and he became an Associate of the Royal College of Art, London in 1951.

He married artist and best-selling author Pamela Griffiths MNZM AM in 1964. They had two children.

== Career ==
Between 1953 and 1959, Allen was employed by the New Zealand Department of Education, first as a field officer to the Northern Māori Experimental Art Project, and then as a liaison organiser to secondary schools. In 1960, he moved to the Elam School of Fine Arts at the University of Auckland, where he was a lecturer and later senior lecturer until 1976 taking a research sabbatical in 1968 to the UK, US and Mexico. Between 1977 and 1987, Allen was the inaugural head of the School of Art at the University of Sydney.

== Select works ==
In 1959, Allen collaborated with architect John Scott, designing the stained glass windows for Our Lady of Lourdes Church, Havelock North.

Allen and Scott collaborated again on the creation of Futuna Chapel in Wellington, which opened in 1961. Allen designed the chapel's coloured perspex windows, its 14 Stations of the Cross, and the wooden crucifix wall-mounted above the altar. He also designed the "light modulators", made of rimu, glass and yellow perspex, that are installed above the entranceway to reduce afternoon sunlight entering the chapel. Auckland Art Gallery Toi o Tamaki curator Ron Brownson called Allen's 2.5-metre-high (8.2 ft) pan-cultural Christ one of the most significant wood carvings produced in New Zealand during that period. This mahogany statue of Christ was stolen from the chapel in 1999 or 2000, and recovered in 2012. It was returned to the chapel in 2013 after a restoration process. The Stations underwent conservation work in 2021.

In 1962, Allen designed the concrete, stained glass and leaded light baldachin for St John's Church in Te Awamutu.

After the Futuna Chapel, Allen's work moved further away from traditional approaches and concepts. One piece, made in 1965, was a seven-metre-long (23 ft) work commissioned for the Wellington offices of chemical company ICI at 61 Molesworth Street, Wellington. It involved, according to Allen, "a sculptured concrete panel inspired by the micro-structure of naturally occurring copper crystals". The office building was badly damaged in the 2016 Kaikōura earthquake, but the mural survived the earthquake and the process of demolishing the building.

Other works by Allen from the 1960s include Wairaka (1965), a bronze statue and kinetic water sculpture in Whakatāne, and Conversation piece (1967), a public sculpture in the Auckland suburb of Pakuranga. As the 1960s progressed, Allen increasingly focused on performative and non-object art.

== Environmental and performance works ==
From 1969 on Allen’s work was primarily focused on environments and performances. Soon after returning from his 1968 sabbatical Allen showed five environmental installations in an exhibition titled Small Worlds at the Barry Lett Galleries in Auckland. The work occupied the entire gallery and was constructed as an ‘immersive installation’ using light materials including, calico, UV light, nylon thread, and inflated PVC. The audiences reaction to the work and the way they moved around and through it became a central indicating a move by the artist from ‘sculpture as an activity rather than an object.’ The following year Allen produced another set of enclosures this time constructed from barb wire and hessian titled ARENA versions of which were exhibited at the Govett-Brewster Art Gallery in New Plymouth and at the Mildura Sculpture Triennial. In 1974 Allen’s work shifted to performance pieces. The first was Contact performed in the Barry Lett Galleries a performance piece broken into three parts each using a small number of performers who used props supplied by Allen. The same year Contact was performed again this time at the Auckland Art Gallery where it was part of the exhibition Four Men in a Boat to co-inside with the 1974 Auckland Festival. It was the first performance programme to be shown at the gallery and curator Natasha Conland reflecting on it noted, Unlike any previous exhibition at a public gallery in New Zealand, the participating artists did not show individual works of art; instead, they staged actions and performances within temporary sculptural installations, incorporating new video and ‘live playback’ technology to alter how audiences encountered the artworks. Allen would repeat the private / public gallery cycle in 1975 with his performance piece O-AR first shown at Barry Lett Galleries as Part 1 and then at the Auckland Art Gallery where O-AR Part 2 was performed as part of Project Programme a series of performances curated by John Maynard that included along with Allen, Bruce Barber, John Lethbridge, Kim Gray, Roger Peters and David Mealing. (Wystan Curnow Jim Allen: O-AR Part II: November 11-19 Auckland Art Gallery Quarterly 62-63 pg 23 December 1976 https://cdn.aucklandunlimited.com/aag/assets/media/1976-issue-62-63-gallery-quarterly.pdf In 1976 He was among the early exhibitors at the Experimental Art Foundation in Adelaide, where he used a sabbatical to take up a residency and performing On Planting a Native, Poetry for Chainsaws and Newspaper. The following year Allen left Auckland to become the Founding Head of the School of Art at Sydney College of the Arts. He would teach there for 10 years before returning to New Zealand in 1987 to advise on AUT’s art programme.

== Re-creation of early work ==
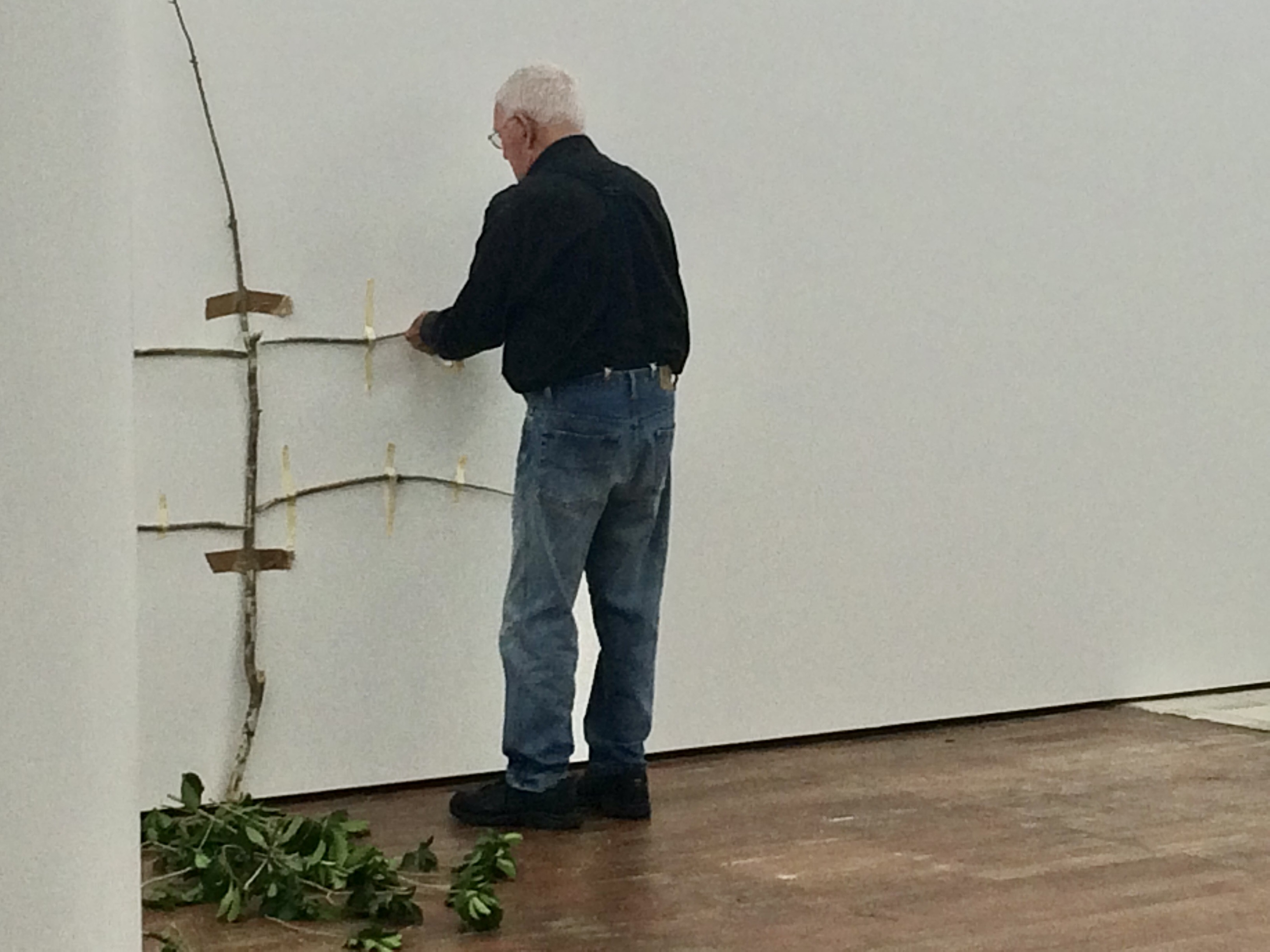
Jim Allen performing 'On Planting a Native' at Michael Lett in 2014

Allen always recognised the value re-creating his environmental and performance works over time and has re-staged a number of early works, such as the three-part Contact and the two-part O-AR, first performed in 1974, and Poetry for Chainsaws, News, and Planting a Native from 1976, in Adelaide, Sydney, Auckland, New Plymouth and Wellington over the years. In 1998 his early environmental work was included in Action Replay: Post Object Art organised jointly by Artspace, the Govett-Brewster Art Gallery and the Auckland Art Gallery, Curator Robert Leonard in describing Allen’s work noted that, 'The environments of Jim Allen … are performative in another way: the viewer’s own movement activates sounds or lights.’ Between 2006 and 2022 he also exhibited regularly with Michael Lett showing new work along with re-presented earlier works including environments and performances. Most of the work re-created at Michael Lett were from originals made and performed between 1969 and 1976. In 2011 a re-creation of Contact was shown at Artspace for the Auckland Festival and later toured to public art galleries including the Govett-Brewster in New Plymouth. In another recreated performance, On Planting a Native at Michael Lett in 2014, Allen dismembered a New Zealand native tree with a chainsaw before recreating it taped flat onto the gallery wall. You can see a video of this performance here. Allen was included in the exhibition Groundswell: Avant-Garde Auckland 1971–79 at the Auckland Art Gallery in 2018 and in 2022 on Allen’s 100^{th} birthday Poetry for Chainsaws, first performed in Pavilion K at the Epsom showgrounds in December 1974, was re-created at the Lett East Gallery. On this occasion the performer reading poetry out loud over the sound of chainsaws was Allen’s daughter Ruth Allen.

== Later life, death and legacy ==
In the 2004 Queen's Birthday Honours, Allen was appointed a Member of the New Zealand Order of Merit for services to education and the arts. In October 2007, he was awarded an honorary doctorate by Auckland University of Technology, and in 2015 he was named an Arts Foundation Icon, limited to 20 living people, by the Arts Foundation of New Zealand. Allen turned 100 in July 2022, which was celebrated by the Auckland Art Gallery in an exhibition of his works from 19 July to 28 November 2022.

Allen died in Auckland on 9 June 2023, at the age of 100. Work by Allen is held in the collection of New Zealand's national museum, Te Papa.

Allen's daughter, Ruth Allen, is a Melbourne-based glass sculptor.
