= Tuakana Aporotanga =

New Zealand Māori healer (c. 1852–1937)

Tuakana Aporotanga (c. 1852–1937) was a New Zealand Māori tohunga of Ngāti Rua, a hapū of Te Whakatōhea. As a leader within the Ringatū church his role as tohunga served as healer and priest.

His mother, Mākawa, was daughter of Te Āporotanga, a leader of Ngāti Rua, and his father was Charles Frederick Leggett, an Englishman who settled in Ōpōtiki in the 1840s.

As a tohunga healer he lived strictly in accordance with the law of tapu, never letting his body touch hot water, and keeping rooms sacred for prayer and healing separate from activities of daily living, and especially food preparation.

He died in 1937 at Ōrangipakakino, and was buried in an unmarked grave at the Ngāti Rua cemetery, Te Rangi-o-matanui.
