= Hira Te Popo =

Hira Te Popo (?–1889) was a New Zealand tribal leader. Of Māori descent, he identified with the Te Whakatohea iwi.
