= Royal albatross =

Royal albatross (Māori: Toroa) may refer to:

== Birds ==
- Northern royal albatross, Diomedea sanfordi
- Southern royal albatross, Diomedea epomophora

== Ships ==
- Royal Albatross (ship), a luxury tall ship located at Sentosa, Singapore
