= Arautauta =

- Great Māori migration waka
- Commander: Tarawa
- Landed at: Bay of Plenty
- Iwi: Te Whakatōhea

In Māori tradition, Arautauta was one of the great ocean-going, voyaging canoes that was used in the migrations that settled New Zealand. It was piloted by Tarawa and landed near Ōhiwa.

== See also ==
- List of Māori waka
