= Wharenui =

Māori meeting house

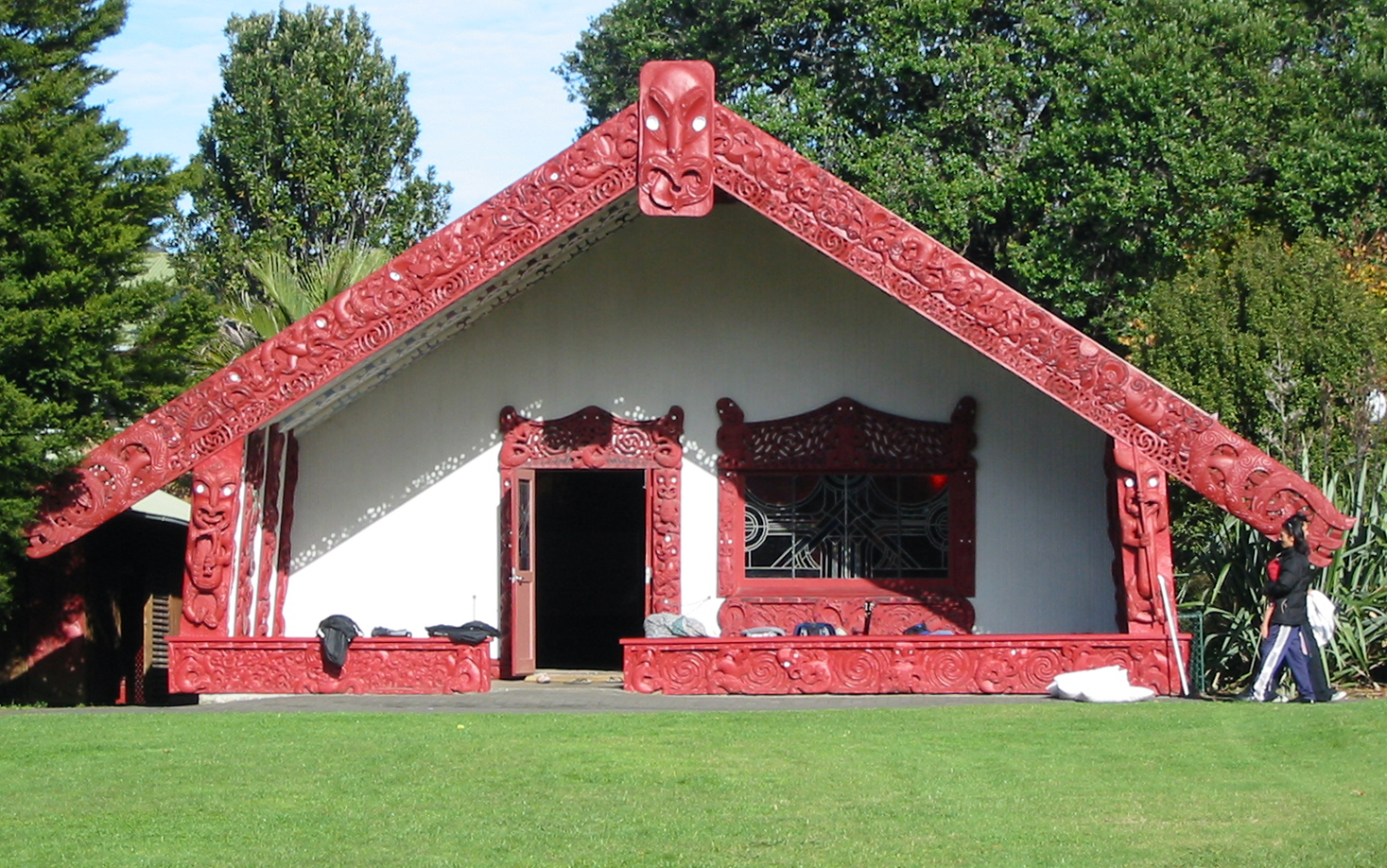
Tāne-nui-ā-rangi, the wharenui at Waipapa Marae, University of Auckland

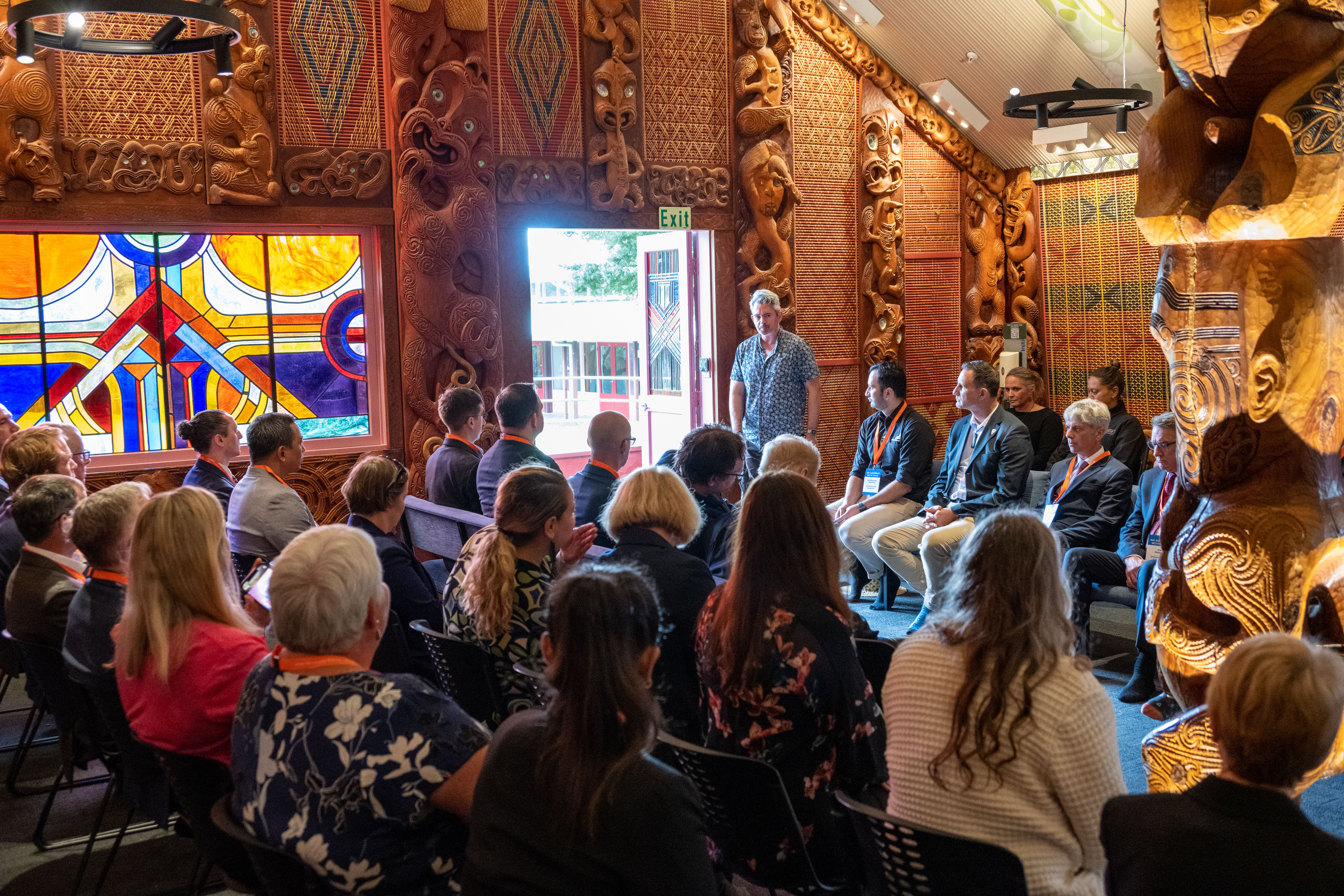
Inside Tāne-nui-ā-rangi at Waipapa Marae

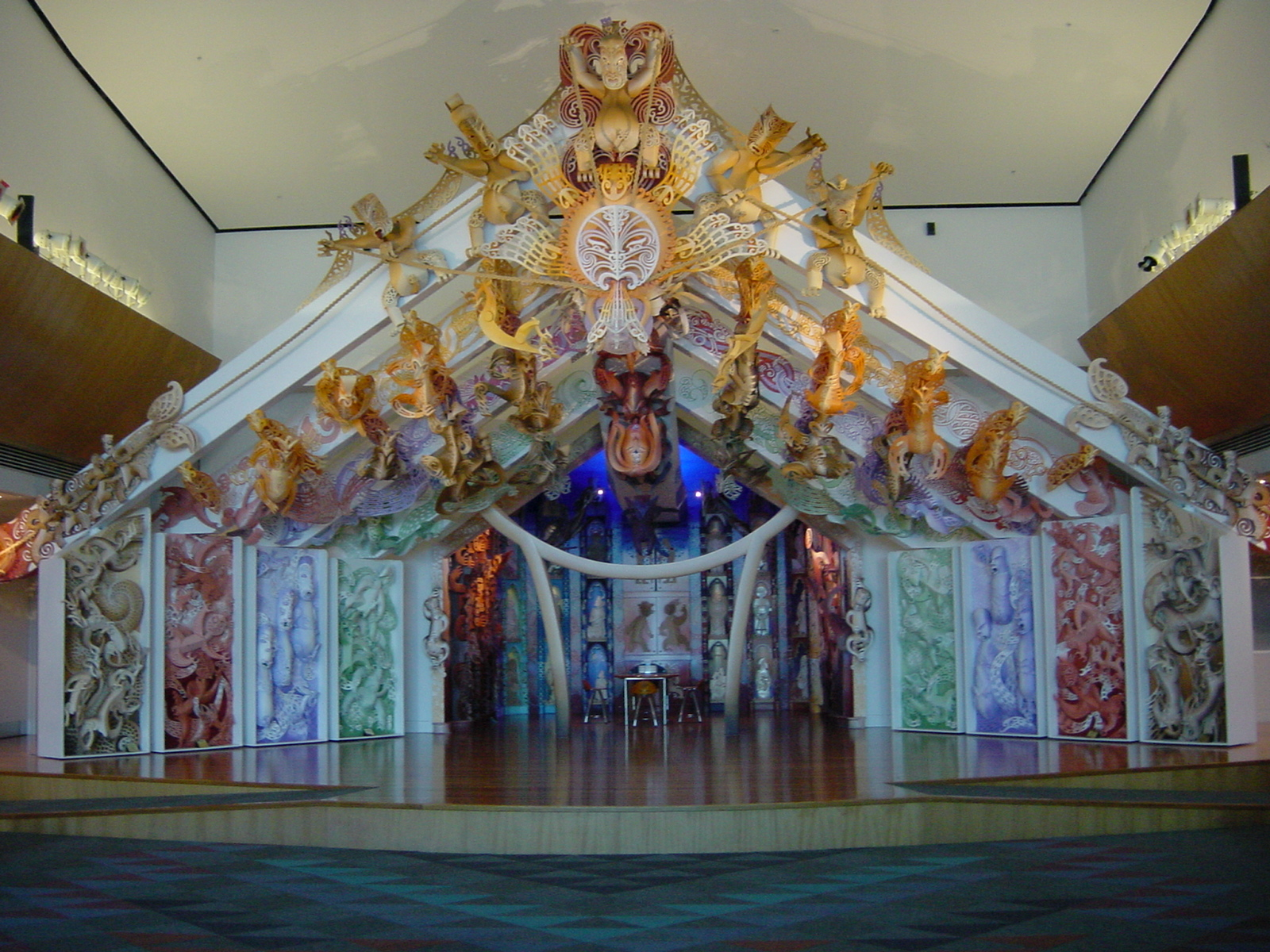
A modern wharenui at Te Papa, a museum in Wellington

A wharenui ([ˈɸaɾɛnʉ.i]; literally "large house") is a communal house of the Māori people of New Zealand, generally situated as the focal point of a marae. Wharenui are usually called meeting houses in New Zealand English, or simply called whare (a more generic term simply referring to any house or building). Also called a whare rūnanga ("meeting house") or whare whakairo (literally "carved house"), the present style of wharenui originated in the early to middle nineteenth century. The houses are often carved inside and out with stylised images of the iwi's (or tribe's) ancestors, with the style used for the whakairo (carvings) varying from tribe to tribe. Modern meeting houses are built to regular building standards. Photographs of recent ancestors, as well as carvings, may be used. The houses always have names, sometimes the name of a famous ancestor or sometimes a figure from Māori mythology. Some meeting houses are built at places that are not the location of a tribe, but where many Māori gather; typically, a school or tertiary institution with many Māori students.

The wharenui is considered the realm of the peace deity Rongo while the surrounding marae is sacred or tapu being for Tūmatauenga; entrance thus is often described as "climbing up" (piki or eke) instead of "arriving" (haere) inside it to discard trailing tapu. While a meeting house is considered sacred, it is not a church or house of worship, but religious rituals may take place in front of or inside a meeting house. On most marae, no food may be taken into the meeting house; a special eating house (whare kai) is made separate of it.

== History ==
Wharenui have been built in New Zealand for hundreds of years continuing architectural traditions of other related Polynesian peoples. Fundamentally, all whare were built by building arch-like foundation made of wall posts tensed to rafters and the ridgepole which was supported by a central post underneath. This central post was seen as symbolic of forest god Tāne pushing away his parents Rangi and Papa so that he and his siblings can escape. Frame components were bound together by complex rope lashing techniques (mīmiro) adapted from local seamanship applying tensile forces while allowing for flexible shifting and relaxing during seismic activity, such techniques however became increasingly obsolete with the introduction of nails into part of the woodwork. The mīmiro was successfully tested of its resistance with an experimental model set up in Ōpeke near Waioeka as a collaborative study between a research team headed by Prof. Anthony Hōete from the University of Auckland School of Architecture and Planning with the local hapū Ngāti Ira in 2023.

By the 15th century, wharenui became more elaborately carved, and large enough that one or two central pou (posts) were needed to carry the weight of the structure. In the 18th century during the voyages of James Cook, he and his crew sighted wharenui which were 10 metres in length, and entirely carved. The introduction of steel tools by European settlers enabled the size and scale of wharenui to increase, and wharenui built from the 1840s onwards became the direct antecedents of the style and structure of modern wharenui. Taiporohenui, constructed at Manawapou (near modern day Mokoia in South Taranaki) in the 1850s, was 27.6 metres long and 9.2 metres wide. The size and scale of Taiporohenui symbolised the opposition of Māori to European settlement and colonisation of traditional lands. Te Kooti oversaw the construction of three massive wharenui during the New Zealand Wars. The first, Tanewhirinaki, which was completed in the late 1860s and located at Waioeka, was painted in black, pink and white. Construction of Te Whai-a-te-Motu at Ruatāhuna began in 1870, and was eventually completed in 1888. The third, Te Tokanganui-a-Noho, was constructed at Te Kūiti in 1873, after Te Kooti retreated behind the border of the King Country. These wharenui were used for meetings, church services and accommodation. After the construction of Te Tokanganui-a-Noho, very few wharenui were created for decades, and those which were built were simpler and uncarved.

By the 1920s, marae and wharenui had become a symbol of Māori cultural identity, especially among people who were landless. Āpirana Ngata was a proponent of reviving wharenui as a symbol of Māori identity and mana. Waikato Tainui leader Te Puea Hērangi was a large proponent of the re-development of marae in the country, leading to the construction of wharenui at Tūrangawaewae in Ngāruawāhia and Te Puea Memorial Marae, the first urban marae in Auckland.

During the 19th and early 20th century, missionaries and Christians condemned whakairo depicting genitalia, and removed penises of ancestors from the carvings on wharenui. Opposition to carvings depicting genitalia ceased in the 1940s.

== Structure ==
The building often symbolises an ancestor of the wharenui's tribe. Different parts of the building represent body parts of the ancestor.

Labelled parts of the wharenui

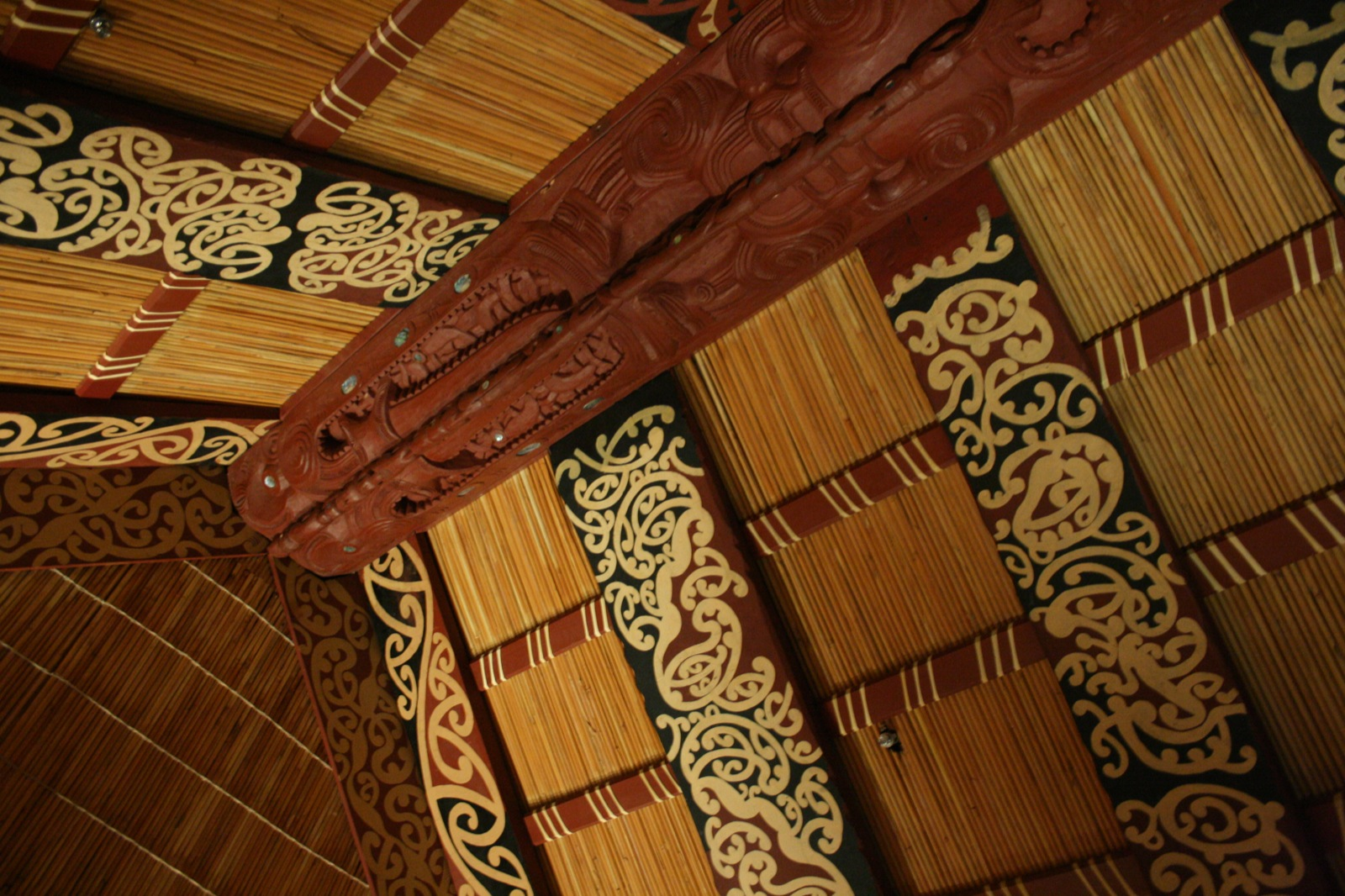
The ridgepole (tāhuhu) and perpendicular rafters (heke) from inside
- The koruru at the point of the gable on the front of the wharenui can represent the ancestor's head.
- The maihi (diagonal bargeboards) signify arms; the ends of the maihi are called raparapa, meaning "fingers".
- The tāhuhu (ridge beam) represents the backbone.
- The heke or rafters signify ribs.
- The internal central column is the poutokomanawa or "heart-supporting post".

Other important components include:

- The amo, the vertical supports that hold up the ends of the maihi
- The poupou, upright carved panels that line the inside walls of the verandah and interior
- The kūwaha or front door, along with the pare or door lintel
- The paepae, the horizontal element on the ground at the front of the wharenui, which acts as the threshold of the building

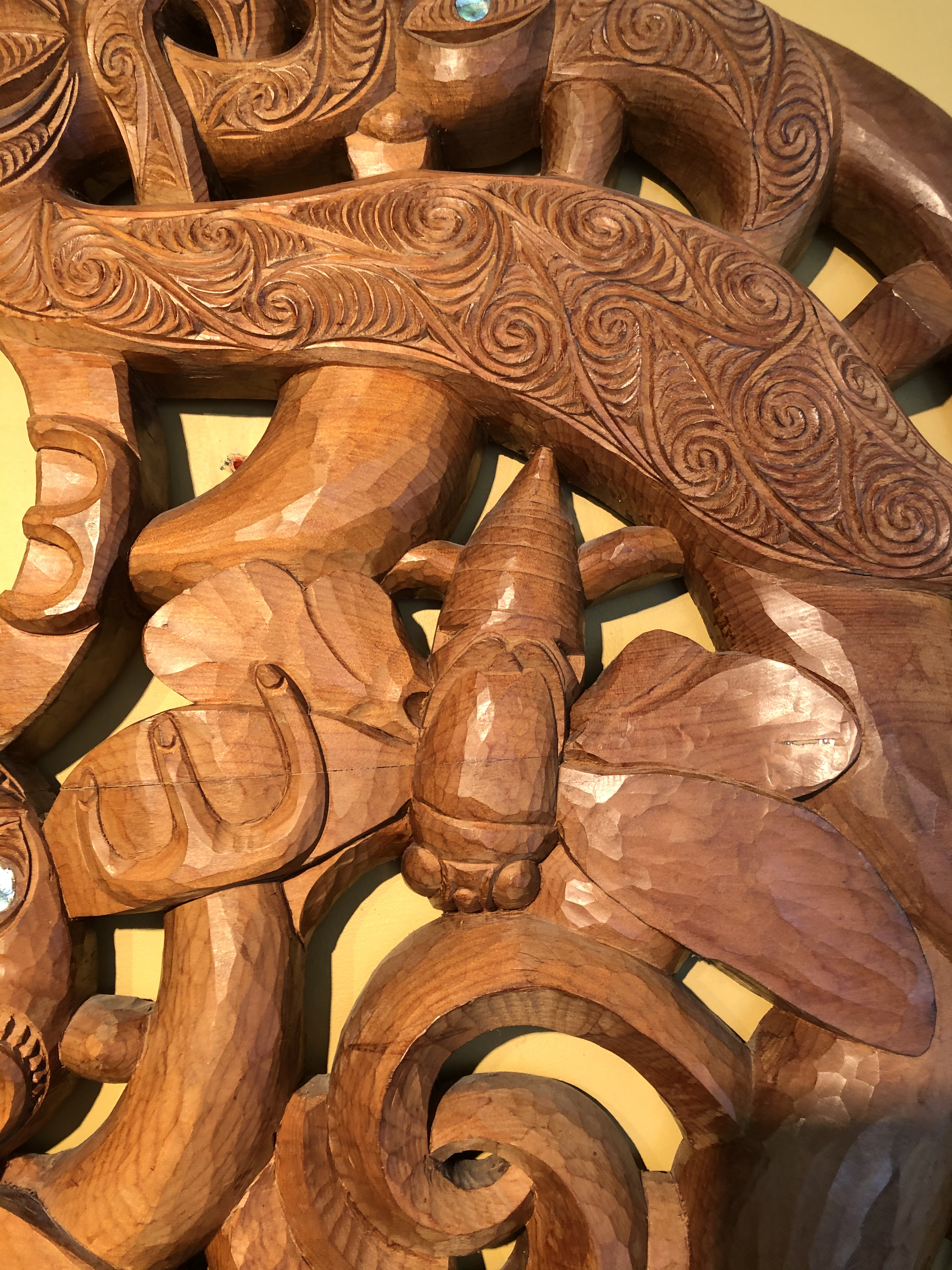
A carved pare including a depiction of a chorus cicada

Shoes are taken off before entering the wharenui, the floor is often covered with woven mats (whāriki).

The marae ātea is a very important open space directly in front of the wharenui, which is used to welcome visitors onto the marae and serves as an area on which to debate issues.

== Protocols ==
Meeting houses are the centre of any cultural, business, or any affair which is relevant to the iwi as a whole.

- Typically, visitors to the village would be allowed to stay in the meeting house at night. Visitors are allocated to the right-hand door-facing "large side" (tara whānui) while local villagers sleep on the left-hand "small side" (tara iti), very important guests sleep in the prominent space (ihu nui) under windows which are built last, whether the front window in the past or in rear rooms present.
- Ceremonial occasions, including wedding and funeral typically take place in the meeting house or on the marae ātea in front of the house.
- Strict rules of conduct generally govern the use of the wharenui, which is considered the domain of unity and peace. If anyone should become irate or physically violent, they would be asked to leave the house until they can control their temper.

== See also ==
- Māori culture
- Māori language
- Indigenous architecture
- Longhouse
- Meeting house
