= Mātaatua =

Waka, one of the great voyaging canoes of Māori tradition

- Great Māori migration waka
- Commander: Toroa
- Priest: Tama-ki-hikurangi or Tāneatua
- Landed at: Kakahoroa (Whakatāne)
- Iwi: Ngāi Te Rangi, Ngāi Tūhoe, Ngāpuhi, Ngāti Awa, Ngāti Pūkenga, Te Whakatōhea, Te Whānau-ā-Apanui
- Settled at: 1200s-1300s CE

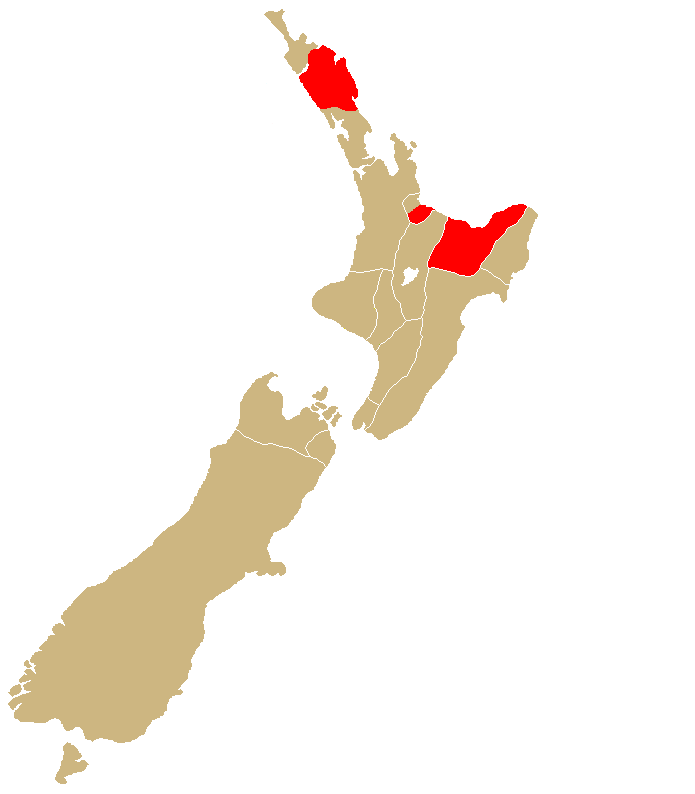
Map of iwi within Mātaatua Māori

Mātaatua was one of the great voyaging canoes by which Polynesians migrated to New Zealand, according to Māori tradition. Māori traditions say that the Mātaatua was initially sent from Hawaiki to bring supplies of kūmara to Māori settlements in New Zealand. The core crew of the Mātaatua was formed of the children of Irakewa, his sons: Toroa, Puhi, and Tāneatua, his daughter Muriwai, and their families.

Mātaatua Māori include the tribes of Ngāi Tūhoe, Ngāti Awa, Te Whakatōhea, Te Whānau-ā-Apanui, Ngāpuhi, Ngāi Te Rangi, Ngāti Pūkenga.

== Background ==
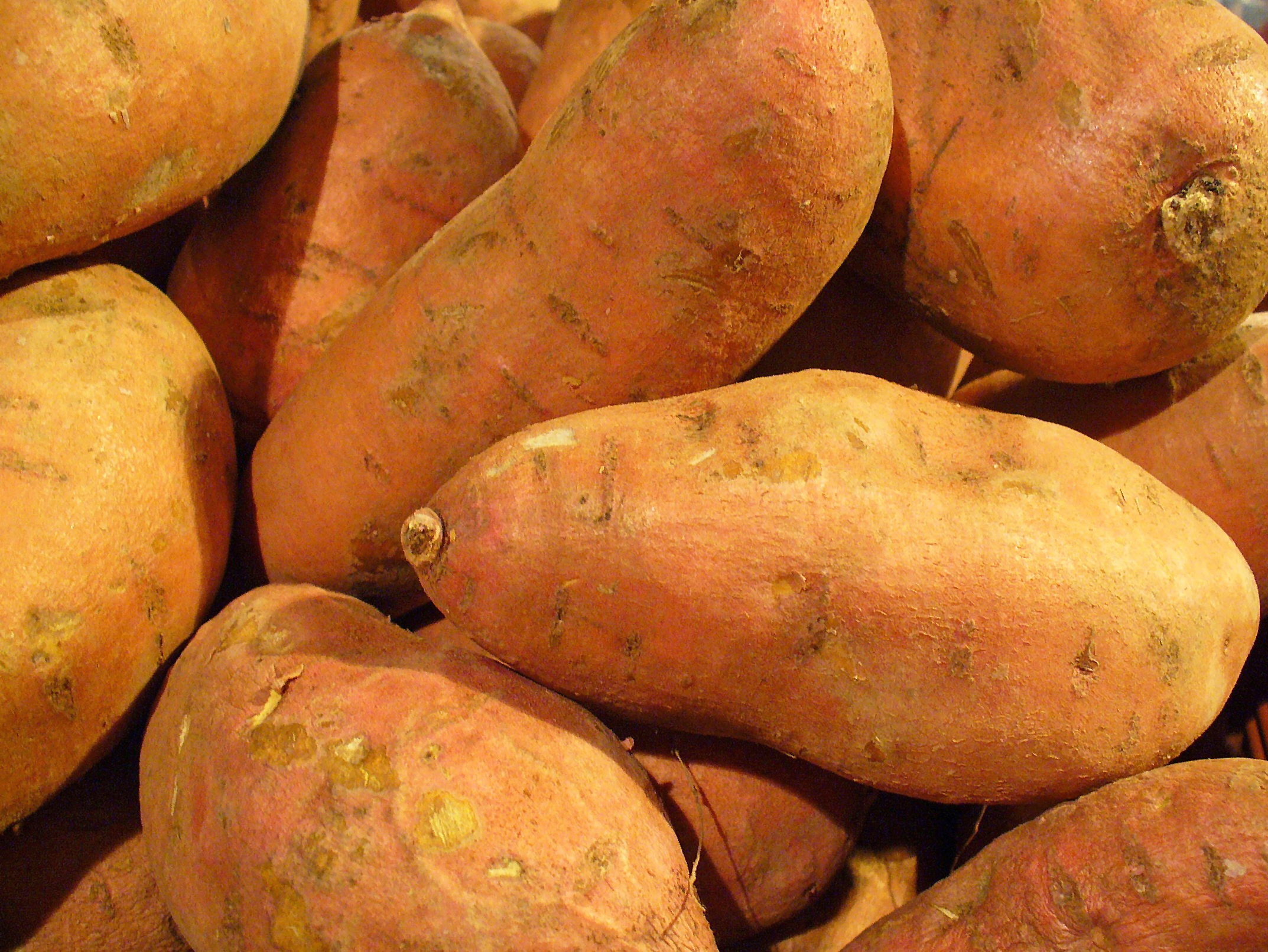
Kūmara (sweet potato) tubers

The explorer Hoaki and his brother Taukata had travelled to New Zealand from Hawaiki in the Tutara-kauika, searching for their sister Pourangahua, whom they eventually found at Kirikino in Tūranganui. Along the way, they visited Tama-ki-hikurangi at Kakahoroa and discovered that the people of New Zealand had no kūmara. They returned to Hawaiki in Te Aratāwhao seeking kūmara seeds and bearing the news that the islands were sparsely populated. It was decided that the crew of Te Aratāwhao should make the return journey with the seeds on a new canoe, the Mātaatua. Hoaki gave the crew the kūmara seeds and instructed them to kill his brother Taukata and offer him as a sacrifice to ensure that the kūmara would grow.

Mātaatua had been built at the command of Irakewa, a chief in Hawaiki, who had three sons, Tāneatua, Toroa, and Puhi and a daughter, Muriwai. All traditions agree that he told the children to claim and settle at the Wairere Falls and Te Ana o Muriwai cave about Whakatane. The traditions differ on why he did this. According to a Ngāti Awa source reported to Elsdon Best, he had seen the place in a dream. According to a Ngāti Tūwharetoa account recorded by John Te Herekiekie Grace, Irakewa had previously travelled in New Zealand, married Kiwa and had a son Tāneatua, there.

Best says that the canoe was originally named Tuamatua, after an ogress of that name.

== Crew ==
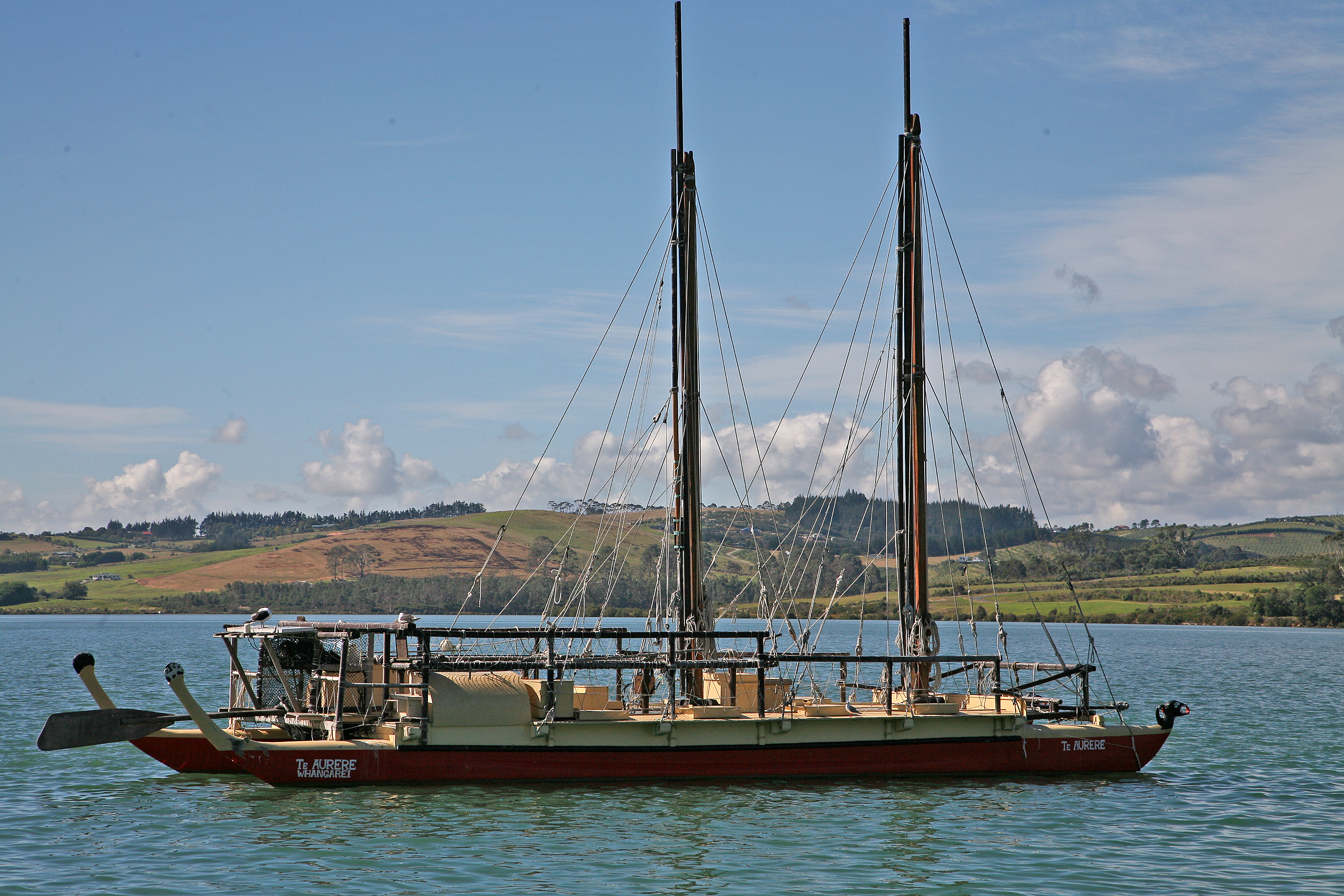
Te Aurere, a modern reconstruction of a sea-going waka (canoe)

The crew consisted of both men and women. Toroa was selected as the captain of the canoe, as the eldest son. Most sources give the navigator and tohunga of the vessel as Tama-ki-hikurangi, who had come to Hawaiki along with Hoaki and Taukata, was chosen as the navigator, but some name his brother Tāneatua instead. The following men and woman are recorded as members of the crew:

- Toroa (captain)
- Tama-ki-hikurangi (navigator and tohunga)
- Tāneatua, brother of Toroa (tohunga)
- Puhi-kai-ariki, brother of Toroa, ancestor of Ngāpuhi
- Muriwai, sister of Toroa, ancestor of Whakatōhea
- Ruaihonga, son of Toroa, ancestor of Ngāti Awa and Ngāi Te Rangi
- Wairaka, daughter of Toroa, ancestor of Ngāti Pūkenga and Tūhoe
- Rahiri, son of Puhi, ancestor of Ngāti Rāhiri
- Taukata, brother of Hoaki
- Te Moungaroa (joined the crew at Rangitahua)
- Turu (joined the crew at Rangitahua)
- Akuramatapu
- Hinemataroa
- Kakepikitia
- Kanioro
- Manu
- Nuiho
- Puharaunui
- Puhimoana-ariki
- Ruauru
- Tahingaotara
- Taka
- Tarawhata
- Tuturiwhatu
- Wekanui

== Journey to New Zealand ==
The canoe stopped en route from Hawaiki at Rarotonga and Rangitahua in the Kermadec Islands, where it encountered the Aotea Kurahaupō. As they were departing, a storm forced two members of Kurahaupō's crew, Te Moungaroa and Turu, to join the Mātaatua. John Te Herekiekie Grace records a karakia ('incantation') sung by Toroa during the voyage to keep the hull intact in the face of the stormy seas, which begins, tutapa, tutapa, tutapa mai kawa, ko te kawa nui, ko te kawa roa ("recite, recite, recite the ritual, the great ritual, the long ritual").

The Mātaatua landed at Whangara on the East Cape of New Zealand, along with the Tokomaru and Te Moungaroa and Turu chose to settle there, marking their decision by constructing a tuahu altar. Toroa took the Mātaatua west to Whangaparāoa River and then Tauranga. At this point he turned back and followed the coast east. When the canoe passed the mouth of the Tarawera and Rangitaiki Rivers, Toroa's daughter Wairaka cried out Aue! He atua kei uta ra! (Oh! There are gods on these shores"), from which the mouth of the river came to be known as Te Awa o te Atua. Finally, they reached Kakahoroa (Whakatāne).

== Bay of Plenty settlement ==
=== Naming of Whakatāne ===
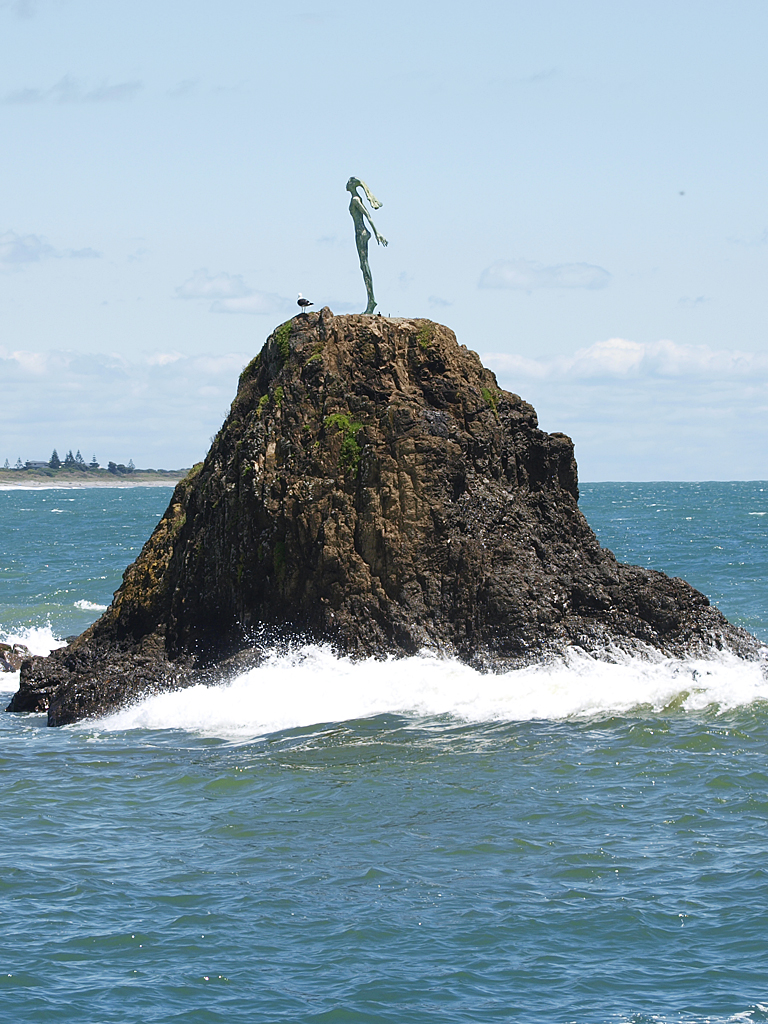
Modern sculpture of Wairaka at Whakatāne

When the canoe landed at Kakahoroa, the men of the crew went ashore to visit Toikairakau's pā, Kaputerangi, which was to become their first base. Meanwhile, the women unloaded provisions from the canoe. The tide began to rise and Mātaatua was nearly swept away, but one of the women managed to tie the canoe down, saying as she did it, E whakatane ahau e a hau ("let me make a man of myself"), from which the area received its modern name, Whakatāne. Ngati Awa and Tuhoe say that this was Toroa's daughter Waireka, Te Whakatohea that it was his sister Muriwai.

=== Erection of Makaka ===
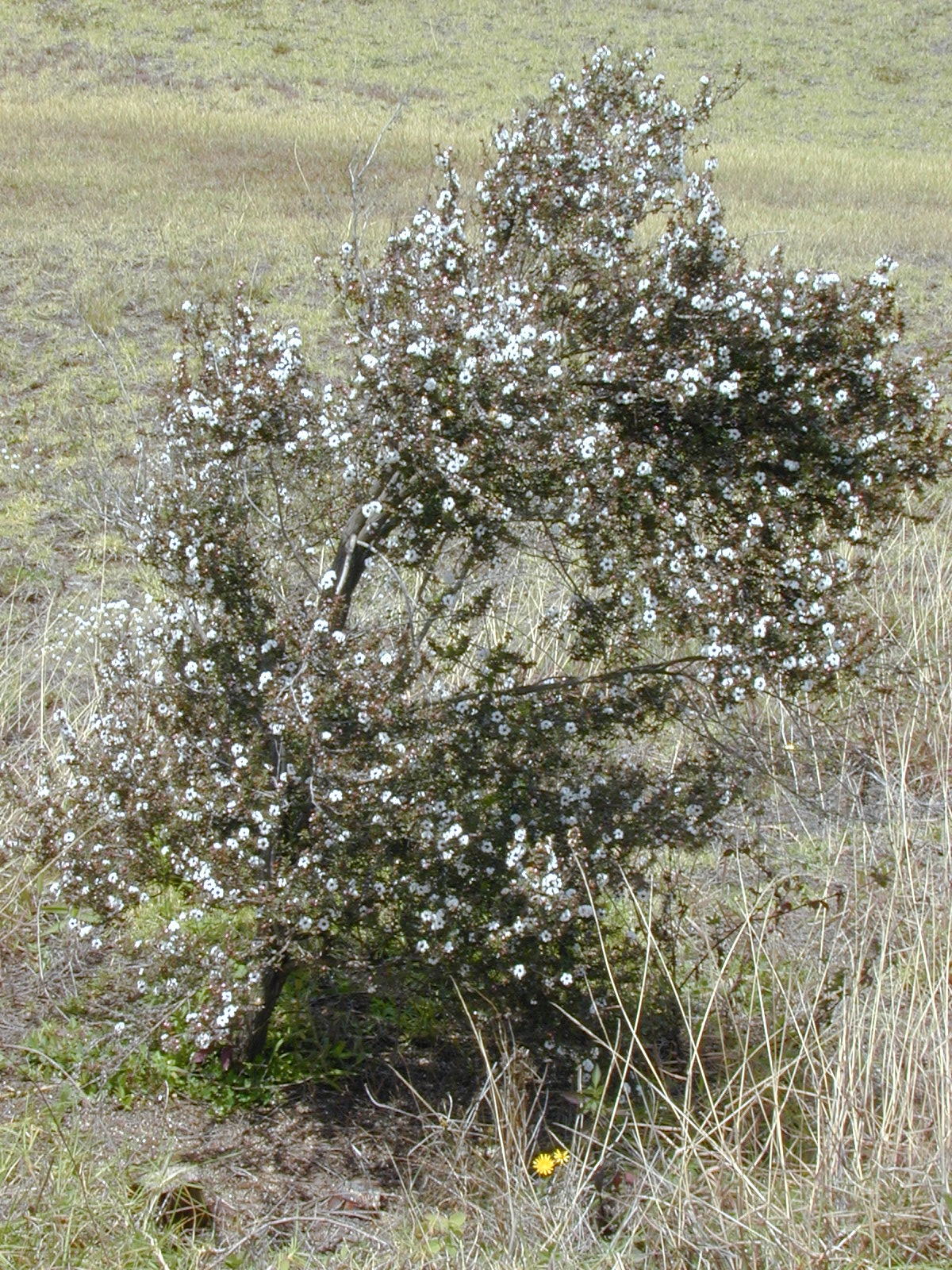
Mānuka tree

The people settled at Kaputerangi pā, alongside Tamakihikurangi's people. They built a tuahu altar called Makaka, which was a single long pole made of Mānuka, under which they placed the mauri of the canoe (the physical manifestation of its prestige). Its erection is the source of the proverbial expression Ngati Awa, te manuka tutahi ("Ngati Awa, the people of the lone manuka pole"). The descendants of the canoe's crew used to return to this altar to expurgate their sins and sufferings and carry out rituals for good fortune.

=== Conflict between Toroa and Puhi ===
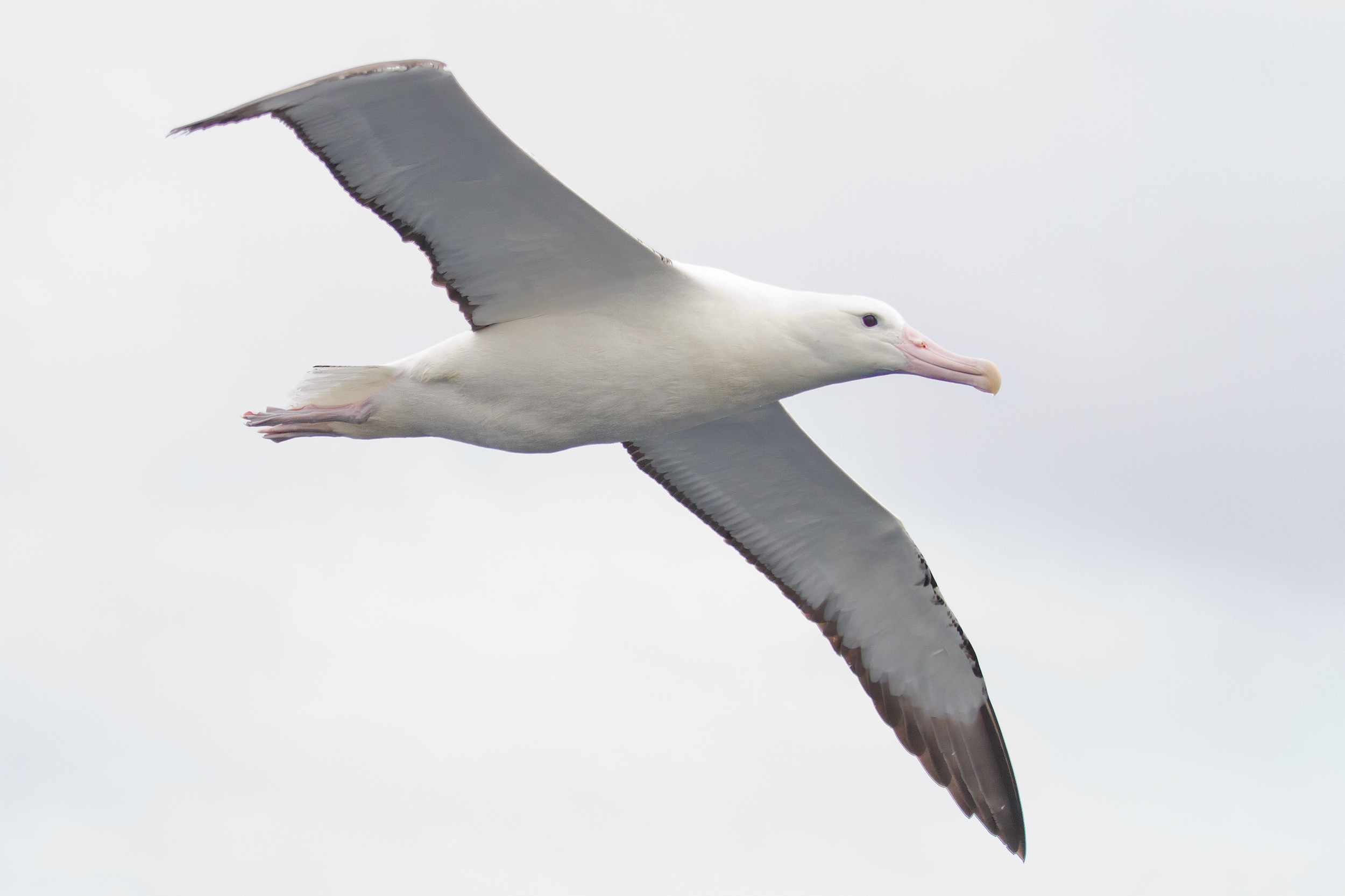
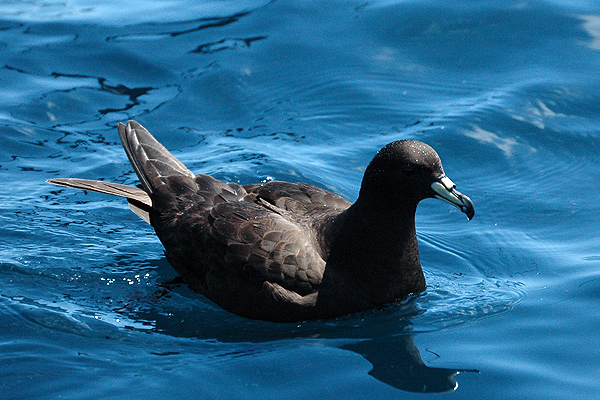
An albatross (toroa) and a black petrel (taiko)

The rituals connected to the sowing the kūmara were carried out. Taukata was killed and his skull was taken to the fields to protect the crop. However, they sparked a conflict. Irakewa had said that Toroa should perform the karakia (incantations) connected with the sowing of the kūmara, but his younger brother Puhi attempted to perform the rituals instead. They quarrelled and Tāneatua took Toroa's side. Grace records an angry song sung by Puhi on this occasion, which concludes tangi ana te whakatopatopa o kai, o kai mai he toroa, he taiko ("I hear the planting chants resound, but your food is an albatross and a black petrel"), referring to Toroa and Tāneatua. Calling them food in this way was a grave insult and it is the origin of Puhi's full name, Puhi-kai-ariki (Puhi who eats chiefs). Toroa responded with a planting song, recorded by Grace, which includes the lines E Puhi e! Ngahoro e! Kai tai, kai tai, kai te whakrua koia, e--e (Oh Puhi! You are fallen! You twice drinker of sea water"). In his anger, Puhi took the Mātaatua and left with most of its crew to travel further north. The tribe of Te Whakatōhea, descended from Muriwai, may be named from this event (te waka tohea means "the canoe contended for").

=== Settlement ===
Toroa, Tāneatua, Muriwai, and their immediate families remained in the Bay of Plenty and their descendants intermixed with previously established Māori tribes in the region. Toroa settled at Kaputerangi and built a wharenui called Tupapakurau. Tāneatua settled at Purikau (near Ōhiwa) and built his own house called Whareariki. He had taken the tauihu (figurehead) from Mātaatua before Puhi left and installed it at his new home. People from Ngāi Tūhoe, Ngāti Awa, Te Whakatōhea, Te Whānau-ā-Apanui and the Tauranga Moana tribes can trace their origins to this settlement. A proverb refers to the territories of Mātaatua as stretching mai Tikirau ki nga kuri a Wharei ("from Tikirau to the dogs of Wharei").

Because much of the land in the Bay of Plenty was already settled, many members of the crew scattered further afield in search of land to settle. One of them, Taka travelled south across the desert plateau of Te Onetapu, but it was so cold that he died. His dogs survived and roamed wild in the region, coming to be known as nga kuri a Taka ('the dogs of Taka').

== Northland settlement ==
Many accounts say that, from the Bay of Plenty, Puhi traveled northward in the Mātaatua and put to shore at the Takou stream in Matauri Bay in Northland. The Ngāpuhi people can trace their origins to this settlement. Tribes in both the Bay of Plenty and Northland agree that the final resting place of the Mātaatua was at Tākou Bay in the Bay of Islands.

== Legacy ==
Many iwi can trace their origins to ancestors on the Mātaatua canoe. Tribes in both the Bay of Plenty and Northland maintain strong ties, and a reunion was held in 1986. A replica of the Mātaatua rests at the Mataatua Reserve in Whakatāne.

Three wharenui (meeting houses), at Ruatāhuna, Whakatāne and Rotorua, are named after the Mātaatua canoe.

== See also ==
- List of Māori waka

== Bibliography ==
- Best, Elsdon (1896). In ancient Maoriland : being notes collected from the descendants of the aboriginal people of the Rangitaiki Valley and the Ure-wera Country and from the Mataatua Tribes : given by members of the Ngati-Manawa, Ngati-Whare, Tuhoe, Ngati-Apa, Ngati-Awa, Ngati-Hamua and Patuheuheu tribes. Rotorua: Hot Lakes Chronicle Office.
- R.D. Craig, Dictionary of Polynesian Mythology (Greenwood Press: New York) 1989.
- Grace, John Te Herekiekie (1970) [1959]. Tuwharetoa: The history of the Maori people of the Taupo District. Auckland [N.Z.]: A.H. & A.W. Reed. ISBN 9780589003739.
- Steedman, J.A.W. (1984). Ngā Ohaaki o ngā Whānau o Tauranga Moana: Māori History and Genealogy of the Bay of Plenty.
- Taonui, Rāwiri. "Canoe Traditions". Te Ara – the Encyclopedia of New Zealand.
- Walker, Ranginui (2004). Ka Whawhai Tonu Matou - Struggle Without End (2nd ed.). Auckland, New Zealand: Penguin Books. p. 47. ISBN 9780143019459.
- Department of Maori Studies (1986). Te whakatuwheratanga o Te Tumu Herenga Waka : 6 Tihema 1986, Poneke, Te Whare Wananga o Wikitoria. Wellington: Victoria University of Wellington.
