= Nukutere =

- Great Māori migration waka
- Commander: Whiro
- Priest: Tautūrangi
- Landed at: Waiaua in the Bay of Plenty
- Iwi: Te Whakatohea Ngāi Tūhoe, Ngāti Porou and other eastern Bay of Plenty iwi

Nukutere was one of the Māori migration canoes that brought Polynesian migrants to New Zealand. Nukutere is one of the lesser known canoes. However, the descendants of the Nukutere migrants can be found in Ngāi Tūhoe, Ngāti Porou and in other eastern Bay of Plenty iwi.

According to Ngāti Awa traditions, the Nukutere landed at Waiaua in the Bay of Plenty, bringing with it supplies of taro, along with specimens of karaka and ti plants. Te Whakatōhea traditions say that Tauturangi came to New Zealand aboard the Nukutere. Tauturangi was the ancestor of Tūtāmure, whose descendants would eventually form the Te Whakatōhea iwi.

== See also ==
- List of Māori waka
