= Gareeb Stephen Shalfoon =

Gareeb Stephen Shalfoon (1904–1953) was a notable New Zealand dance band musician, storekeeper and music shop proprietor. Of Māori descent, he identified with the Te Whakatohea iwi. He was born in Ōpōtiki, Bay of Plenty, New Zealand in 1904.

His band the "Melody Boys" made the first jazz recording in New Zealand in 1930, on a short publicity film.
