= Whangaparāoa River =

- Route of the Whangaparāoa River
- Mouth of the Whangaparāoa River Whangaparāoa River (North Island)

Location
- Country: New Zealand

Physical characteristics
- Source: Raukumara Range
  - coordinates: 37°43′39″S 178°07′13″E
- Mouth
  - location: Whangaparāoa Bay, Bay of Plenty
  - coordinates: 37°34′05″S 177°59′49″E
  - elevation: 0 m (0 ft)
- Length: 24 km (15 mi)

Basin features
- Progression: Whangaparāoa River → Whangaparāoa Bay → Bay of Plenty → Pacific Ocean
- Tributaries
  - left: Hamutīnui Stream, Mangaongāwāhine Stream, Mangaomatua Stream, Mangapōuri Stream,
  - right: Waiariki Stream, Mōhau Stream, Oheta Stream, Te Rereauira Stream

The Whangaparāoa River is a river in the eastern North Island of New Zealand. Its headwaters are in the Raukumara Range and the Gisborne District, from where it flows northwest to reach the sea at Whangaparāoa Bay, an indentation in the far east of the Bay of Plenty, 5 kilometres (3 mi) south of Cape Runaway.

== See also ==
- List of rivers of New Zealand
