= Whakatōhea =

Māori iwi (tribe) in Aotearoa New Zealand

Te Whakatōhea
- Iwi (tribe) in Māoridom
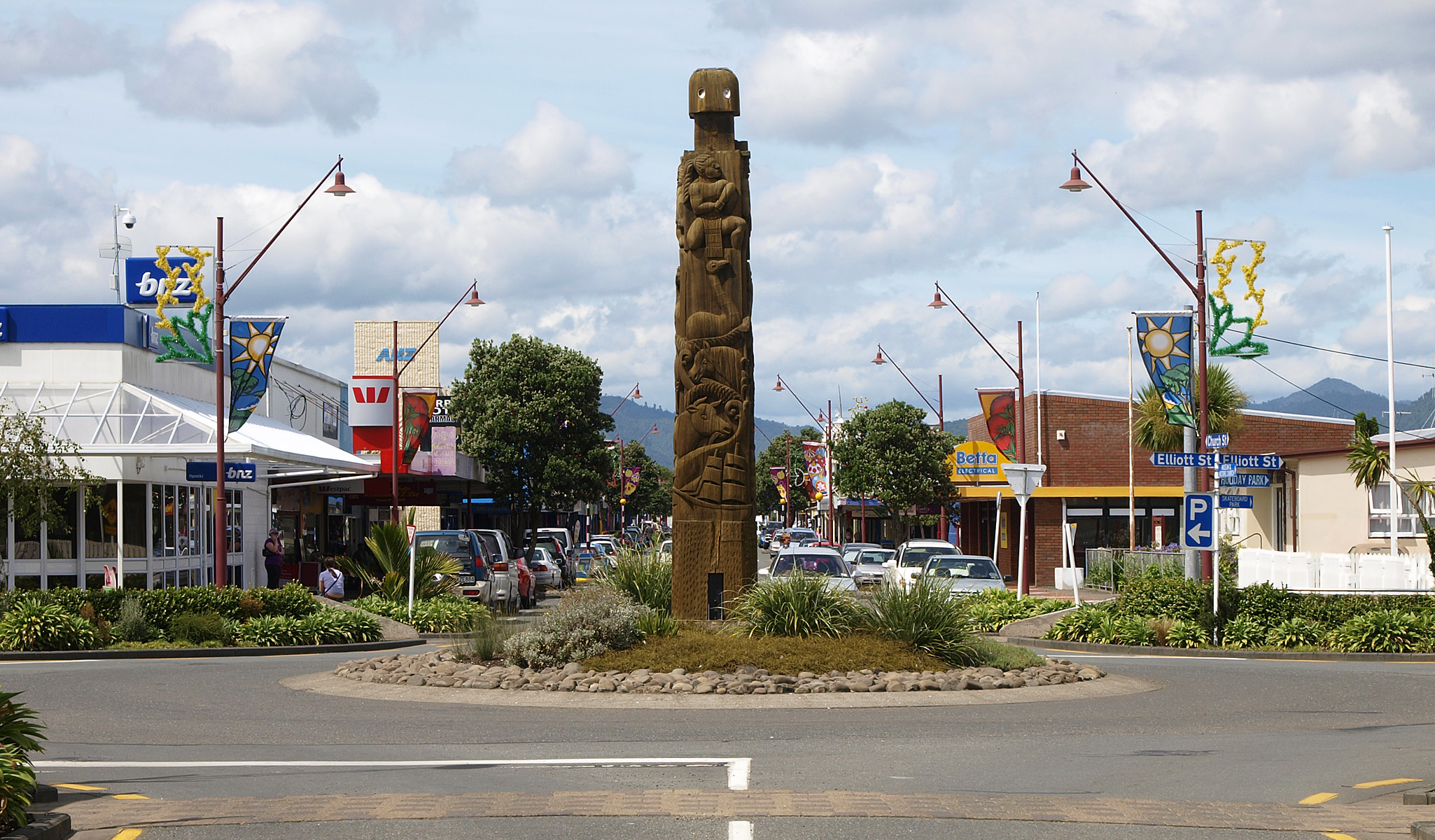
- Ōpōtiki township

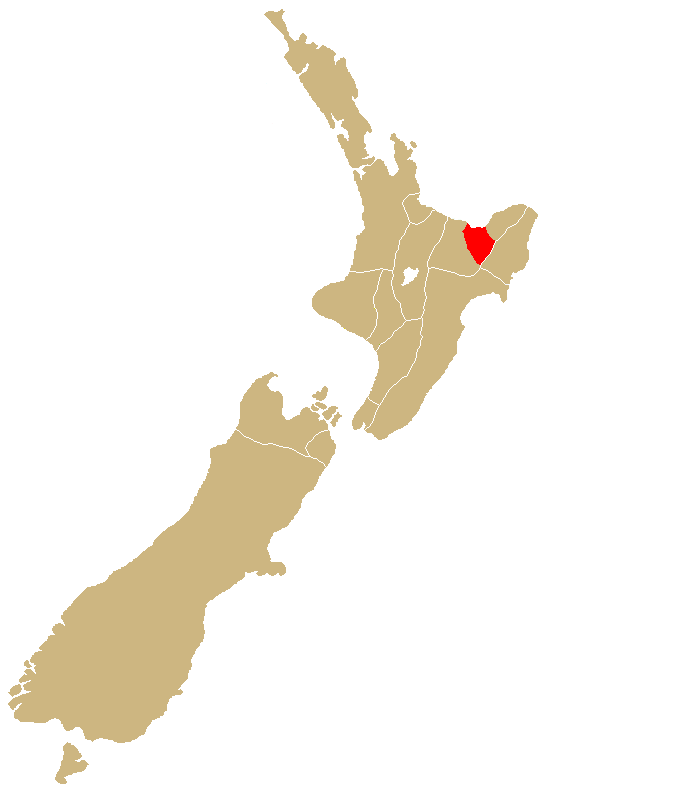
- Rohe (region): Bay of Plenty
- Waka (canoe): Arautauta, Mātaatua, Nukutere
- Population: 9,948

Te Whakatōhea is a Māori iwi of the eastern Bay of Plenty region of New Zealand. Their traditional territory extends along the coastline eastwards from Ōhiwa Harbour to Opape, and inland to Mātāwai, and is centred in the area around the town of Ōpōtiki. These lands have long held an abundance of food resources, particularly seafood. All their historical pā were situated near the coast, to defend the marine resources.

In the 2006 Census, 12,072 people claimed an affiliation with Te Whakatōhea.

== History ==
=== Pre-European history ===
One of Te Whakatōhea's earliest ancestors was chief Tarawa and his brother Tuwharanui, who had been left behind when the Te Tohorā waka left Hawaiki, and so built Te Arautauta waka to join the rest of their people in New Zealand. They arrived at Paerātā, east of the Waiotahe River. Tarawa released two pet tanahanaha fish into a spring on the eastern bluff above Waiotahe Beach, which came to be known as Ōpōtiki-mai-tawhiti. Tarawa continued up the Mōtū River and married Manawa-ki-aitu.

The tribe's next prominent ancestor was Tautūrangi of his own Te Wakanui tribe, who arrived with the Nukutere waka around 26 generations before 1900CE. It made landfall on a rocky cove and was moored to a flat white rock now known as Te Rangi. Tautūrangi then sailed the waka around to Te Kōtukutuku and went ashore, where he went up the Waiaua Valley to a high point named Kapuarangi where he installed his atua, Tamaīwaho.

Nine generations after the arrival of Nukutere, the next waka to arrive was Mātaatua which landed at Whakatāne with kūmara, and carried the ancestress Muriwai, the eldest daughter of Wekanui and Irākewa whose other two children, sons, were Toroa and Puhi. The three siblings also had a half brother, Tāneatua. In Te Whakatōhea's traditions Muriwai spoke the famous words "kia tū whakatāne au i ahau", or "ka whakatāne au i ahau", which is roughly translated to "make me stand like a man" as Mātaatua was being swept back out to sea, while Muriwai's brothers and their men were scouting the land. It was these words that gave her the right to pull the waka back to safety, and from these words being spoken at the landing place that Whakatane gets its name. Toroa's daughter Wairaka was an ancestress of Ngāti Awa and Ngāi Tūhoe.

Muriwai's son Rēpanga went to Ōpōtiki and married Ngāpoupereta, their descendant Ruatakena became the ancestor of Ngāti Ruatakena. Muriwai's daughter Hine-i-kauia followed Rēpanga and married Tūtāmure, born eight generations after Tautūrangi's arrival in New Zealand. He established the eastern boundary between the tribes of Te Wakanui and Ngāi Tai at Tōrere, and inland from Te Rangi cove to Ōroi. He led an attack against Ngāti Kahungunu's pā at Maungakāhia to avenge the murder of his sister Tāneroa, murdered by her husband. Tautūrangi's attacks were so vicious that he broke his weapon, a mere, and had to swap it for another more durable mere made of whalebone. With this he smashed the heads of his enemies, and buried them in the ground. For this his people became known as Te Panenehu ("the buried heads").

Tautūrangi established the Poutōtara pā inland at Waiaua to defend against further attacks from Ngāti Kahungunu. The ancestral house at Omarumutu marae is named Tutamure and the dining room is named Hine-i-kauia, and behind the marae Tautūrangi occupied another pā on the Mākeo hill. Their descendants would become Te Whakatōhea.

Tautūrangi's western counterpart was Kahuki of the Whakatāne hapū. Kahuki conquered the nearby territory in revenge for the killing of his father Rongopopoia, after which he returned to Waiotahe and constructed a pā close to the river. Whakatāne and Ngāti Raumoa, including the Te Ūpokorehe hapū, were living on Waiotahe and Ōhiwa land which were under Kahuki's control. Te Ūpokorehe were subjected to attacks from Ngāti Awa on the western border, and sought refuge at Ōpōtiki. Ngāti Awa and their ally Ngāi Tūhoe would meet with Whakatōhea and their chief Te Rupe for one final battle at Ōhope. Te Rupe was able to boost his peoples' moral with the haka Te kōtiritiri te kōtaratara, and won the battle.

Before the arrival of the Europeans, the final, defining battle against Ngāi Tai was done at Awahou under Punāhamoa's leadership. Ngāi Tai's leader Tūterangikūrei was killed, and his head preserved as a trophy. Ngāi Tai were able to take Tūterangikūrei's head back in exchange for the pounamu adze Waiwharangi, which today is held in the Whakatāne Museum.

=== Modern history ===
The iwi initially had good relations with European settlers and Christian missionaries. However, in 1865, following the murder of German missionary Carl Völkner, and with increasing demands from European settlers for more land, Crown soldiers invaded Te Whakatōhea land. Almost 600 km^{2} of Whakatōhea land was confiscated by the Crown under the New Zealand Settlements Act of 1863. All the hapū were crowded into one area, the Ōpape Native Reserve.

During the twentieth century there was increasing recognition that Whakatōhea had suffered grievances at the hands of the Crown. In 1996, the New Zealand government signed a Deed of Settlement, acknowledging and apologising for the invasion and confiscation of Whakatōhea lands, and the subsequent economic, cultural and developmental devastation suffered by the iwi. A settlement between Whakatōhea and the Crown and redress was finalised on 27 May 2023.

Tuiringa Manny Mokomoko, an activist for tūpuna who died in 1866, received a Royal Pardon in 1992 over wrongful confiscation of Māori land.

== Hapū and marae ==
Whakatōhea consists of about 17,000 whānau belonging to six hapū.

The status of Te Ūpokorehe, a tribal group covering an area between Ōhope and Ōpōtiki, is in dispute. It was included as a hapū within Whakatōhea when the Whakatōhea Māori Trust Board was established in 1952. Some consider it part of Whakatōhea and want it to be part of the iwi's Treaty of Waitangi settlement, while others consider it a separate iwi and want it to have its own Waitangi Tribunal hearing and settlement.

Hapū	Mountain	River	Moana (harbour/lake)	Marae	Meeting house	Dining hall
Ngāi Tamahua	Tarakeha	Opepe	n/a	Opape Marae	Muriwai	Tapairu
Ngāti Ira	Mātiti	Waioweka	n/a	Ōpeke Marae	Irapuaia	Te Kurapare
Ngāti Ngāhere	Maungarangi	Otara	n/a	Te Rere Marae	Te Iringa	Whiripare
Ngāti Patumoana	Mākeo	Waiaua	n/a	Waiaua Marae	Ruamoko	Te Puritanga
Ngāti Ruatakena	Mākeo	Waiaua	n/a	Omarumutu Marae	Tūtāmure	Hine-i-Kauia
Te Ūpokorehe (status disputed)	Tirotirowhitu, Pukenui-o-raho, Hiwarau	Kakaho, Waiotahe, Te Karaka	Tairongo	Various	Various	Various

== Governance ==
The Whakatōhea Māori Trust Board was established in 1952 to administer the assets of the iwi, and provides members with education, health services and training in various commercial fields. It is a charitable trust governed by two representatives from each of the six hapū, and based in Ōpōtiki. It is also accountable to the Minister of Maori Affairs and is governed by the Maori Trust Boards Act. The trust represents the tribe's fisheries interest under the Māori Fisheries Act 2004, and its aquaculture interests under the Māori Commercial Aquaculture Claims Settlement Act 2004. It represents the tribe during consultation on resource consent applications under the Resource Management Act 1991.

The Whakatōhea Pre-Settlement Claims Trust represents the tribe during Treaty of Waitangi settlement negotiations. The New Zealand Government recognised the trust's mandate to represent the iwi with an Agreement in Principle signed with the Crown on 18 August 2017. The trust is governed by one trustee elected from each of six hapū, one trustee appointed from each of eight marae, and an additional trustee appointed by Whakatōhea Māori Trust Board. The trust is administered by the same staff as the trust board, in the same offices in Ōpōtiki.

Roimata Marae say they aren't represented on the trusts and the trusts cannot act on their behalf.

The tribal area of Whakatōhea is located within the boundaries of Ōpōtiki District Council and Bay of Plenty Regional Council.

== Media ==
Pan-tribal iwi station Sea 92FM broadcasts to members of Whakatōhea, Ngāitai and Te Whānau-ā-Apanui in the Ōpōtiki area. It is operated by pan-tribal service provider Whakaatu Whanaunga Trust, and is available on 92.0 FM. It operates the low-power Opotiki 88.1 FM, geared towards a young demographic.

== Notable people ==
- Tuakana Aporotanga, tribal leader and Ringatu tohunga
- Te Raumoa Balneavis, interpreter and administrator
- Whirimako Black, singer and actress
- Tangimoe Clay, weaver and textile artist
- Pāora Kīngi Delamere, carpenter and boat-builder
- Matiu Dickson, academic and politician
- George Gage, Ringatū minister
- Wira Gardiner, soldier, civil servant and writer
- Ākenehi Hei, nurse and midwife
- Kayla Imrie, canoeist
- Brent Kerehona Pukepuke-Ahitapu, academic, weaver and author
- Paratene Matchitt, sculpture and painter
- Gareeb Stephen Shalfoon, musician
- Charles Shelford, soldier
- Frank Shelford, rugby union player
- Matiu Te Auripo Te Hau, teacher and community leader
- Hira Te Popo, tribal leader
- Michael Walker, biologist

== See also ==
- List of Māori iwi
