= Matahaka River =

River in New Zealand

- Route of the Matahaka River
- Mouth of the Matahaka River Matahaka River (North Island)

Location
- Country: New Zealand

Physical characteristics
- Source
  - coordinates: 38°07′33″S 177°10′16″E
- Mouth
  - location: Nukuhou River
  - coordinates: 38°05′24″S 177°08′27″E

Basin features
- Progression: Matahaka River → Nukuhou River → Ōhiwa Harbour → Bay of Plenty → Pacific Ocean

The Matahaka River is a river of the Bay of Plenty Region of New Zealand. It is a tributary of the Nukuhou River, which it meets 15 kilometres (9 mi) southwest of Ōpōtiki.

== See also ==
- List of rivers of New Zealand
