= Streptomyces avicenniae =

Scientific classification
- Domain: Bacteria
- Kingdom: Bacillati
- Phylum: Actinomycetota
- Class: Actinomycetes
- Order: Streptomycetales
- Family: Streptomycetaceae
- Genus: Streptomyces
- Species: S. avicenniae

Binomial name
- Streptomyces avicenniae Xiao et al. 2009

Type strain
- 9-9, CGMCC 4.5510, DSM 41943, JCM 16801, MCCC 1A01535

Species of bacterium

Streptomyces avicenniae is a bacterium species from the genus of Streptomyces which has been isolated from the rhizosphere of the plant Avicennia marina in the Fujian Province in China.

== See also ==
- List of Streptomyces species
