= Penicillium brocae =

Scientific classification
- Domain: Eukaryota
- Kingdom: Fungi
- Division: Ascomycota
- Class: Eurotiomycetes
- Order: Eurotiales
- Family: Aspergillaceae
- Genus: Penicillium
- Species: P. brocae

Binomial name
- Penicillium brocae Peterson, S.W.; Pérez, J.; Vega, F.E.; Infante, F. 2003

Species of fungus

Penicillium brocae is a fungal species of the genus Penicillium, which was isolated in Chiapas in Mexico. It is a symbiont of the mangrove tree Avicennia marina.

P. brocae produces brocazine A, brocazine B, brocazine C, brocazine D, brocazine F, bisthiodiketopiperazine, penicibrocazine C and the polyketides brocaenol A, brocaenol B, and brocaenol C.

== See also ==
- List of Penicillium species
