= Ohope Beach Primary School =

Ōhope Beach

Location
- Pohutukawa Avenue, Ōhope Beach, Whakatāne; 37.9700°S 177.0492°E

Information
- Type: Co-ed state primary
- Ministry of Education Institution no.: 1857
- Principal: Cathryn Naera
- Enrolment: 218 (July 2026)
- Socio-economic decile: 9
- Website: ohopebeach.school.nz

Ōhope Beach School is located in Ōhope, 6 kilometres from Whakatāne, on the Northeast Coast of the North Island in New Zealand.

== The school ==
Ōhope Beach School contains a field, a hall, swimming pool, five classrooms in a large building, and an office. The school is a state school that caters for Years 1–6 and has approximately 320 students. The principal, Cathryn Naera, took over from Tony Horsefall, who had been with the school since 2010.

== New Building ==
In 2015, Associate Education Minister Nikki Kaye announced a $13.5m redevelopment for Ōhope Beach School. The redevelopment contains a two-storey block containing 12 teaching spaces, along with an administration block, library, car parking, drop-off areas, and outdoor teaching spaces. The redevelopment project was completed in 2018.
