= Onekawa Te Mawhai Regional Park =

Regional park in the Bay of Plenty, New Zealand

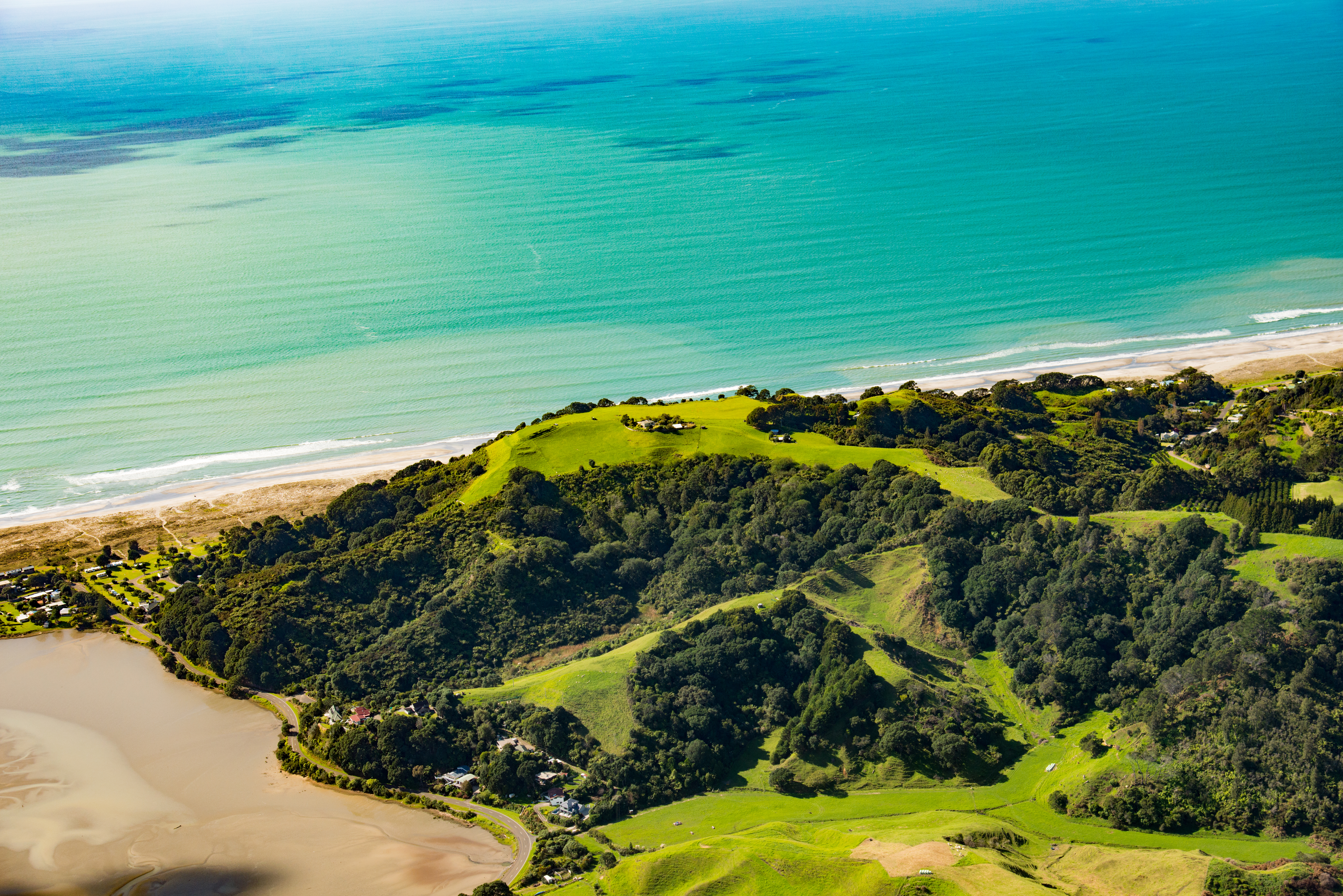

- Location within New Zealand
- Location: Opotiki District, Bay of Plenty Region, New Zealand
- Coordinates: 37.990178°S 177.1668998°E
- Area: 26.8 hectares (66 acres)

Onekawa Te Mawhai Regional Park is a protected area at Ōhiwa in the Bay of Plenty Region of New Zealand's North Island, owned and managed by Bay of Plenty Regional Council in partnership with the Upokorehe hapū.

== Geography ==
The park is located in the Ōpōtiki District, to the northeast of the Ōhiwa Harbour. The park covers 26.8 ha (66 acres), with views to Kohi Point in the west across Ōhiwa Harbour, and east towards East Cape. The park includes several culturally and archaeologically important sites to Upokorehe, including Onekawa Pā.

== Features ==
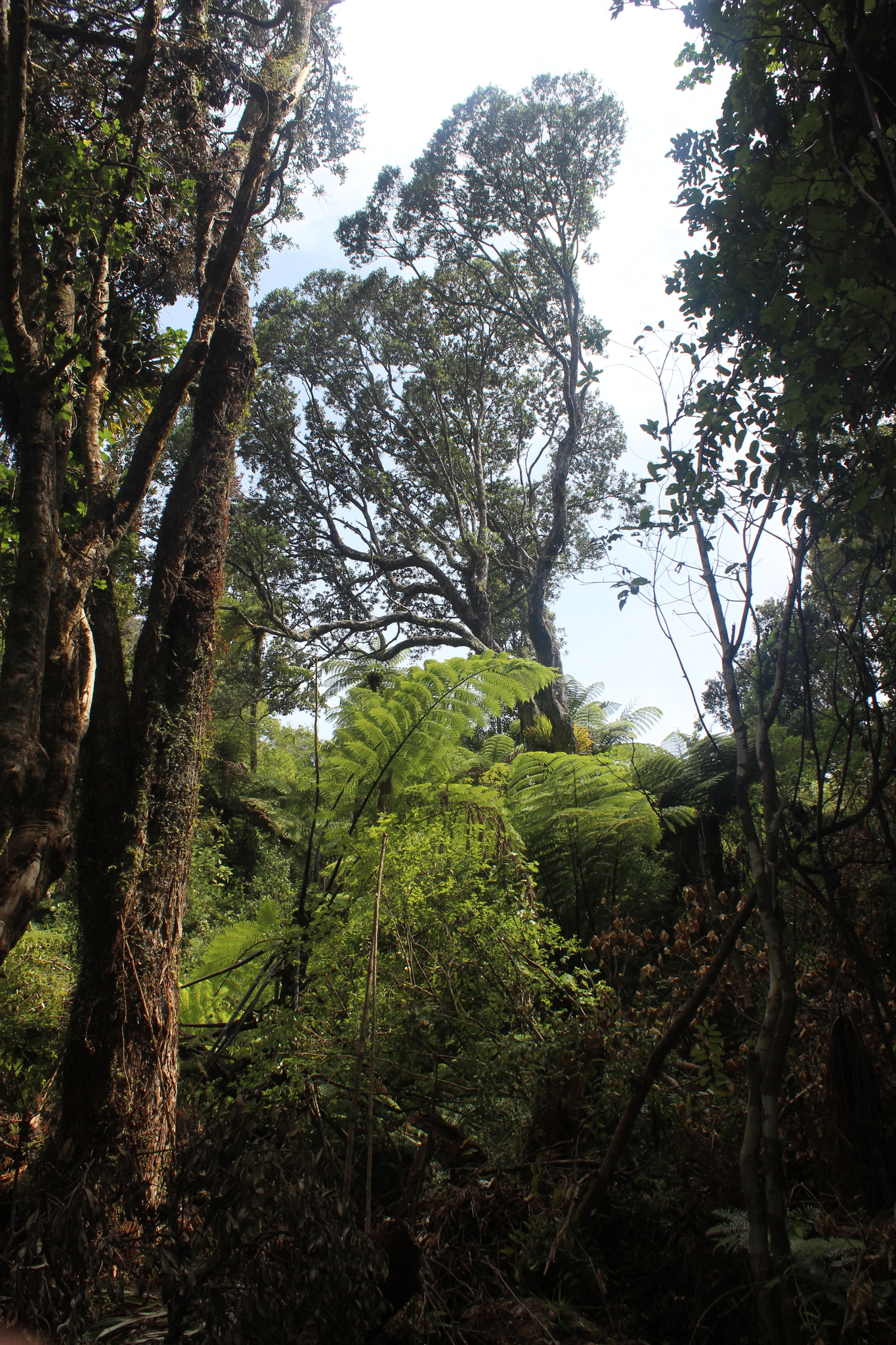
Pōhutukawa at Onekawa Te Mawhai Regional Park

Onekawa Pā is the central feature of the park. A 90-minute walking track leads through ancient pūriri and other native bush to the top of the pā, and then through a working farm to Bryans Beach and back to the carpark.

A side track leads to a waterfall and glowworms.

Horse trekking, camping, motorbikes, mountain bikes, fires, rubbish and unleashed dogs are banned to protect historic sites in the area. Bryans Beach is also a swimming spot during summer.

== History ==
The Onekawa Pā has a long history of occupation, including by the leaders of Repanga, Kahuki and Tuamutu. The surrounding area has been the site of several battles.

Ringatū prophet and warrior Te Kooti Arikirangi Te Turuki settled in the area before his death in 1893.

== See also ==
- Regional parks of New Zealand
- Protected areas of New Zealand
