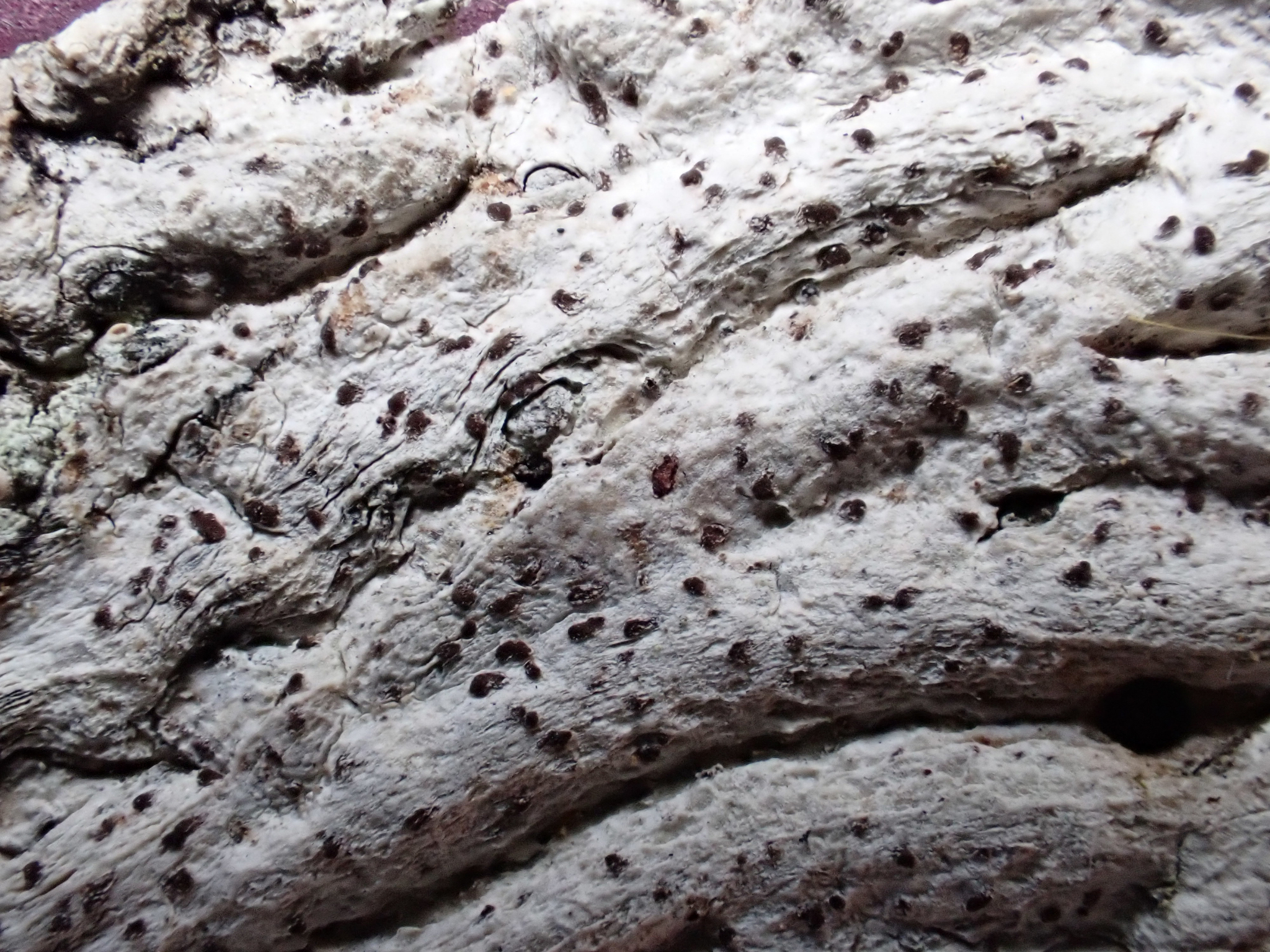
- on the bark of Avicennia marina subsp. australasica at the Whangaroa Harbour, Northland

Scientific classification
- Kingdom: Fungi
- Division: Ascomycota
- Class: Eurotiomycetes
- Order: Pyrenulales
- Family: Pyrenulaceae
- Genus: Pyrenula
- Species: P. dalmatioides

Binomial name
- Pyrenula dalmatioides A.J. Marshall, Blanchon, de Lange & Aptroot

= Pyrenula dalmatioides =

Species of lichen

Pyrenula dalmatioides is a species of lichen in the family Pyrenulaceae which is endemic to New Zealand. It was first described in 2025 by Andrew J. Marshall, Dan Blanchon, Peter de Lange, and André Aptroot. Found in the northern North Island, the species lives almost exclusively in mangrove forests, and is an early coloniser species, displaced by different lichens over time.

== Description ==
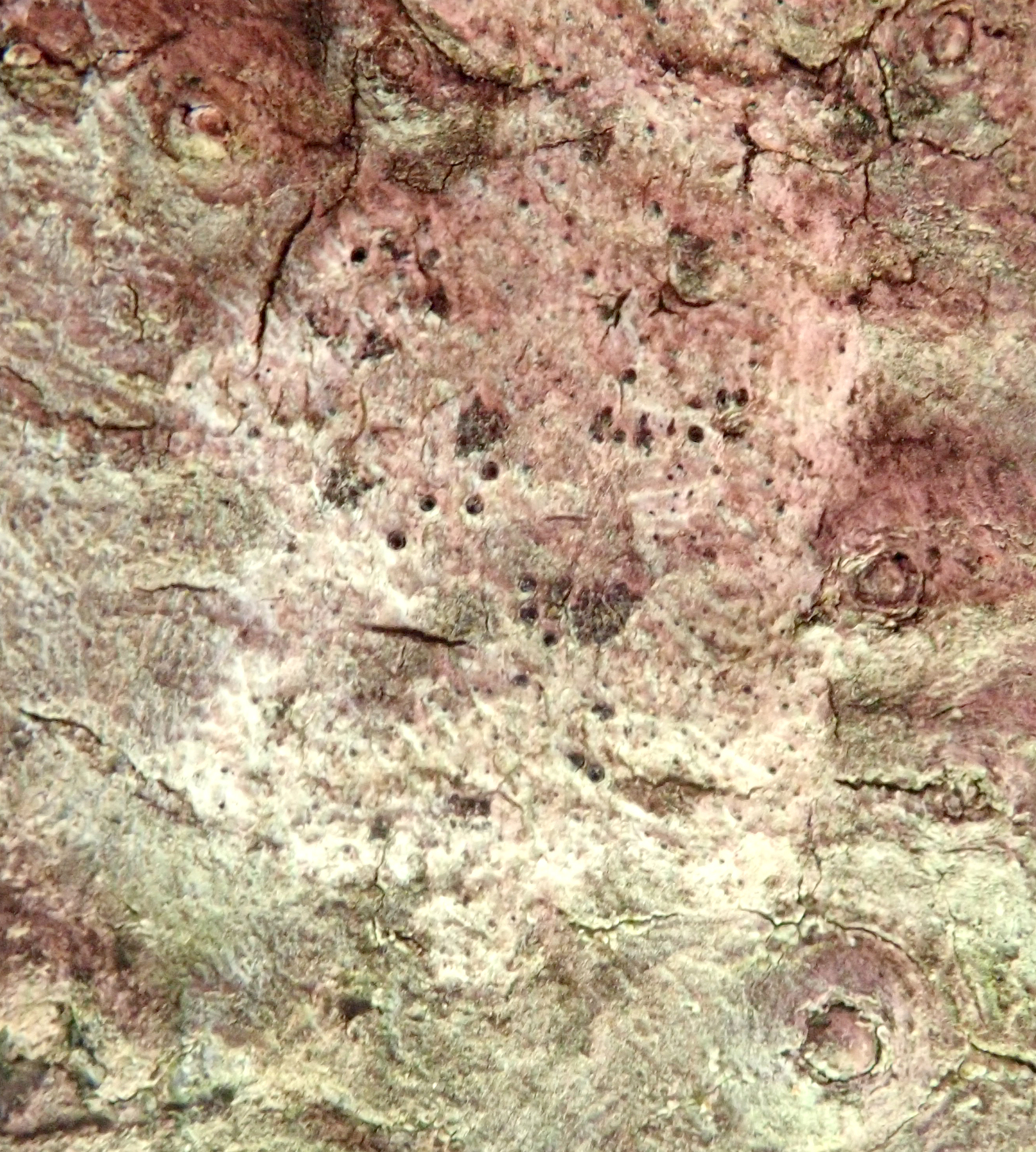
Specimen on a mature Avicennia marina subsp. australasica tree

The species is corticolous, has a crustose thallus, no pseudocyphellae, and is white to creamy-white in colour. It can be distinguished from other members of Pyrenula due to having 5- to 7-septate apiculate spores, which measure between 22 μm (0.00087 in) by 8 μm (0.00031 in) and 30 μm (0.0012 in) by 10 μm (0.00039 in).

== Taxonomy ==
The species was first described by Andrew J. Marshall, Dan Blanchon, Peter de Lange, and André Aptroot in 2025. The species epithet was chosen due to the thallus of the lichen resembling a Dalmatian dog's coat. The holotype is held by the Unitec Institute of Technology herbarium.

== Ecology ==
Pyrenula dalmatioides is an early coloniser species, typically found on young adult or isolated members of Avicennia marina subsp. australasica, becoming displaced by other lichen species over time. The species has also been identified on ngaio trees in the immediate vicinity of mangrove forests.

== Distribution and habitat ==
The species is endemic to New Zealand, occurring on coastal mangrove plants located in the Northland and Auckland regions.
