= Ōhiwa =

Rural settlement in the Bay of Plenty, New Zealand

- Rural settlement
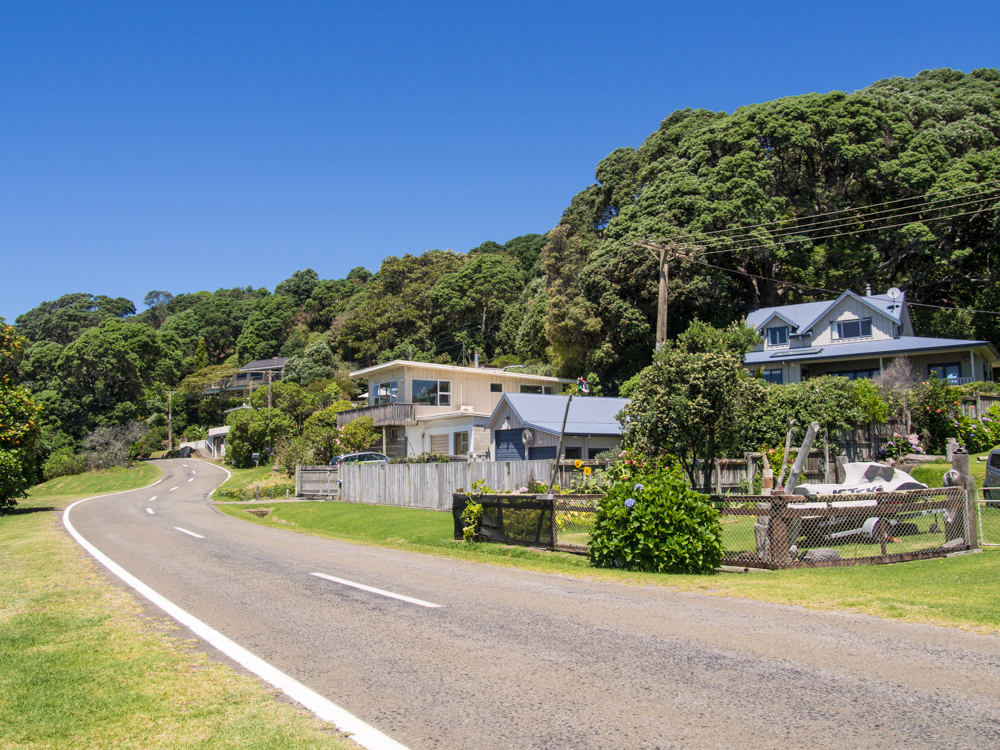
- Ōhiwa Beach Road
- Interactive map of Ōhiwa
- Coordinates: 37.990°S 177.161°E
- Country: New Zealand
- Region: Bay of Plenty
- Territorial authority: Ōpōtiki District
- Ward: Waioeka-Waiōtahe-Otara Ward
- Electorates: East Cape; Waiariki (Māori)

Government
  - Territorial authority: Ōpōtiki District Council
  - Regional council: Bay of Plenty Regional Council
  - Mayor of Ōpōtiki: David Moore
  - East Cape MP: Dana Kirkpatrick
  - Waiariki MP: Rawiri Waititi

Area
  - Total: 3.96 km^{2} (1.53 sq mi)

Population (June 2025)
  - Total: 180
  - Density: 45/km^{2} (120/sq mi)
- Postcode(s): 3174

Ōhiwa is a rural settlement in the Ōpōtiki District and Bay of Plenty Region of New Zealand's North Island. It is on a headland on the eastern side of Ōhiwa Harbour, and on the western side of the Waiotahe River mouth.

The New Zealand Geographic Board officially included the macron in the name from 16 July 2020.

The Ferry Hotel was opened at Ōhiwa in 1873, together with a ferry service to Ōhope. A post office opened in the growing town in 1877. Unstable sand and erosion from 1915 destroyed the town. A second attempt to create sections for baches in the 1960s was also lost to erosion in 1978.

Onekawa Te Mawhai Regional Park was created on the headland in 2010. It incorporates areas of archaeological importance from long Māori use of the area, including Onekawa pā.

A local campground provides accommodation.

== Demographics ==
Ōhiwa is described by Statistics New Zealand as a rural settlement, which covers 3.96 km^{2} (1.53 sq mi). It had an estimated population of 180 as of June 2025, with a population density of 45 people per km^{2}. It is part of the larger Waiotahi statistical area.

Historical population
Year	Pop.	±% p.a.
2006	177	—
2013	156	−1.79%
2018	171	+1.85%
2023	177	+0.69%

Ōhiwa had a population of 177 in the 2023 New Zealand census, an increase of 6 people (3.5%) since the 2018 census, and an increase of 21 people (13.5%) since the 2013 census. There were 90 males, 84 females, and 3 people of other genders in 84 dwellings. 1.7% of people identified as LGBTIQ+. The median age was 61.7 years (compared with 38.1 years nationally). There were 12 people (6.8%) aged under 15 years, 12 (6.8%) aged 15 to 29, 81 (45.8%) aged 30 to 64, and 69 (39.0%) aged 65 or older.

People could identify as more than one ethnicity. The results were 93.2% European (Pākehā), 18.6% Māori, 3.4% Asian, and 3.4% other, which includes people giving their ethnicity as "New Zealander". English was spoken by 98.3%, Māori by 3.4%, and other languages by 5.1%. The percentage of people born overseas was 16.9, compared with 28.8% nationally.

Religious affiliations were 23.7% Christian, 1.7% Hindu, 1.7% Māori religious beliefs, and 3.4% other religions. People who answered that they had no religion were 67.8%, and 3.4% of people did not answer the census question.

Of those at least 15 years old, 45 (27.3%) people had a bachelor's or higher degree, 96 (58.2%) had a post-high school certificate or diploma, and 24 (14.5%) people exclusively held high school qualifications. The median income was $30,300, compared with $41,500 nationally. 15 people (9.1%) earned over $100,000 compared to 12.1% nationally. The employment status of those at least 15 was 60 (36.4%) full-time, 24 (14.5%) part-time, and 6 (3.6%) unemployed.
