= Nukuhou River =

River in New Zealand

- Route of the Nukuhou River
- Mouth of the Nukuhou River Nukuhou River (North Island)

Location
- Country: New Zealand

Physical characteristics
- Source: Confluence of the Arawhatawhata Stream and an unnamed stream
  - coordinates: 38°09′43″S 177°06′55″E
- Mouth
  - location: Ōhiwa Harbour
  - coordinates: 38°01′18″S 177°06′17″E
- Length: 20 km (12 mi)

Basin features
- Progression: Nukuhou River → Ōhiwa Harbour → Bay of Plenty → Pacific Ocean
- Tributaries
  - left: Te Rereoterangi Stream, Horowera Stream, Waingarara Stream
  - right: Waionepu Stream, Werakihi Stream, Matahaka River

The Nukuhou River is a river of the Bay of Plenty Region of New Zealand's North Island. It flows north from its origins 20 kilometres (12 mi) southwest of Ōpōtiki, reaching the Bay of Plenty at the Ōhiwa Harbour, halfway between Ōpōtiki and Whakatāne. The lower section of the Nukuhou River serves as the border between the Whakatāne and Ōpōtiki districts.

== See also ==
- List of rivers of New Zealand
