= Ōhope =

Town in Bay of Plenty Region, New Zealand

- Town
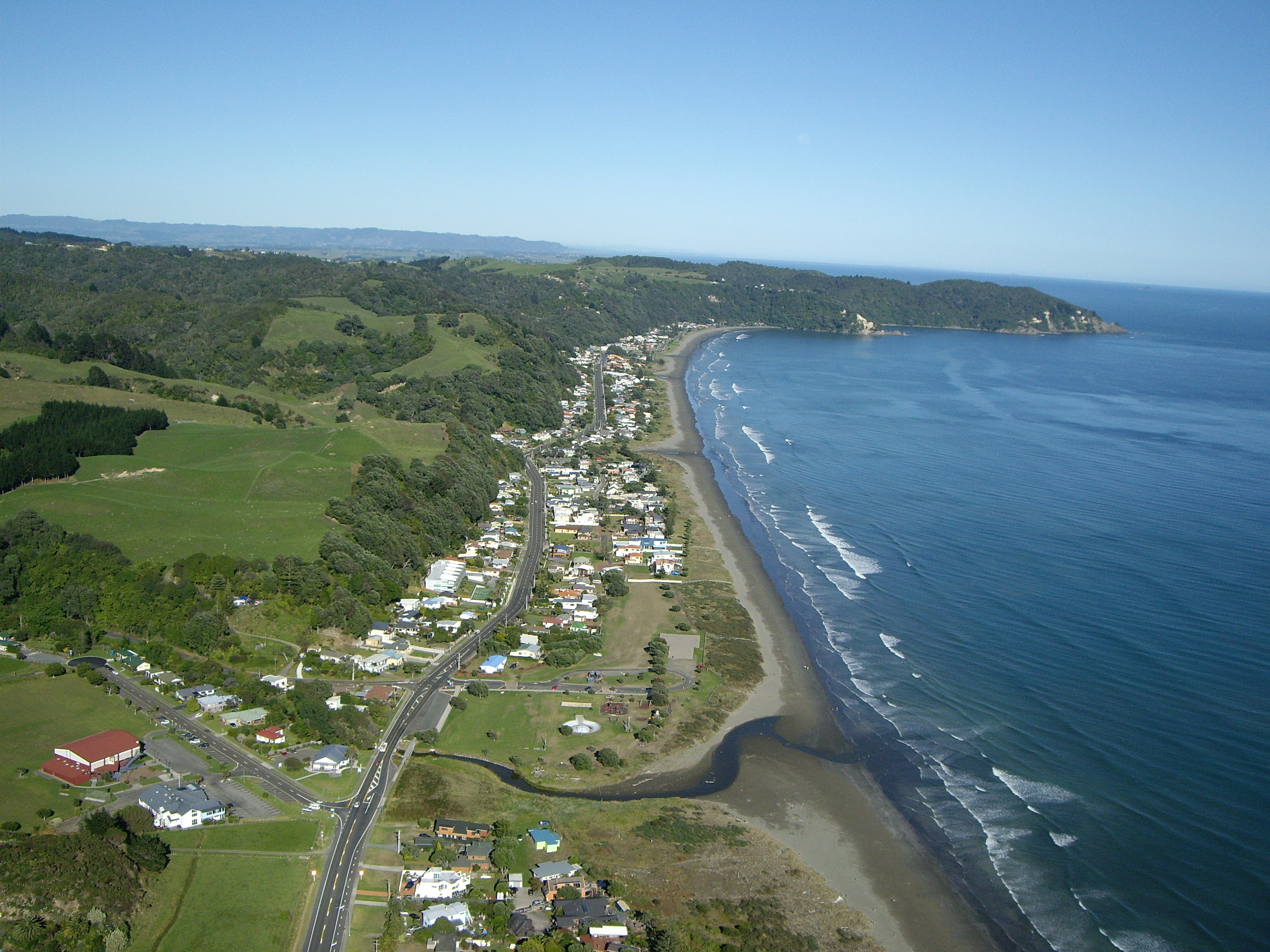
- Ōhope from the air, looking West
- Interactive map of Ōhope
- Coordinates: 37.966°S 177.043°E
- Country: New Zealand
- Region: Bay of Plenty
- Territorial authority: Whakatāne District
- Ward: Whakatāne-Ōhope General Ward
- Community: Whakatāne-Ōhope Community
- Electorates: East Cape; Waiariki (Māori)

Government
  - Territorial authority: Whakatāne District Council
  - Regional council: Bay of Plenty Regional Council
  - Mayor of Whakatāne: Nándor Tánczos
  - East Cape MP: Dana Kirkpatrick
  - Waiariki MP: Rawiri Waititi

Area
  - Total: 6.33 km^{2} (2.44 sq mi)

Population (June 2025)
  - Total: 3,070
  - Density: 485/km^{2} (1,260/sq mi)
- Postal code: 3121
- Area code: 07

Ōhope is a coastal town situated on the northeastern coast of the Eastern Bay of Plenty in New Zealand's North Island. It is six kilometres east of Whakatāne, and is located between Ōhiwa Harbour to the south and Ōhope Beach to the north, providing views of both.

== Name ==
The New Zealand Ministry for Culture and Heritage gives a translation of "place of [the] main body of an army" for Ōhope. On 10 October 1974, the name of the settlement was formally changed from Ohope Beach to Ohope. On 21 June 2019, the official name of the town was changed to Ōhope (with a macron) by the New Zealand Geographic Board.

== Demographics ==
Stats NZ describes Ōhope as a small urban area, which covers 6.33 km^{2} (2.44 sq mi). It had an estimated population of 3,070 as of June 2025, with a population density of 485 people per km^{2}.

Historical population
Year	Pop.	±% p.a.
2006	2,853	—
2013	2,847	−0.03%
2018	3,177	+2.22%
2023	3,033	−0.92%

Ōhope had a population of 3,033 in the 2023 New Zealand census, a decrease of 144 people (−4.5%) since the 2018 census, and an increase of 186 people (6.5%) since the 2013 census. There were 1,476 males, 1,551 females, and 6 people of other genders in 1,362 dwellings. 1.8% of people identified as LGBTIQ+. The median age was 55.7 years (compared with 38.1 years nationally). There were 411 people (13.6%) aged under 15 years, 339 (11.2%) aged 15 to 29, 1,245 (41.0%) aged 30 to 64, and 1,038 (34.2%) aged 65 or older.

People could identify as more than one ethnicity. The results were 89.9% European (Pākehā); 17.4% Māori; 1.5% Pasifika; 2.8% Asian; 0.7% Middle Eastern, Latin American and African New Zealanders (MELAA); and 2.7% other, which includes people giving their ethnicity as "New Zealander". English was spoken by 98.7%, Māori by 4.4%, Samoan by 0.1%, and other languages by 7.8%. No language could be spoken by 0.9% (e.g. too young to talk). New Zealand Sign Language was known by 0.3%. The percentage of people born overseas was 20.7, compared with 28.8% nationally.

Religious affiliations were 34.1% Christian, 0.2% Hindu, 0.5% Islam, 0.9% Māori religious beliefs, 0.5% Buddhist, 0.4% New Age, and 0.6% other religions. People who answered that they had no religion were 55.9%, and 7.1% of people did not answer the census question.

Of those at least 15 years old, 819 (31.2%) people had a bachelor's or higher degree, 1,326 (50.6%) had a post-high school certificate or diploma, and 477 (18.2%) people exclusively held high school qualifications. The median income was $44,500, compared with $41,500 nationally. 435 people (16.6%) earned over $100,000 compared to 12.1% nationally. The employment status of those at least 15 was 1,128 (43.0%) full-time, 396 (15.1%) part-time, and 45 (1.7%) unemployed.

== Tourism ==
Ōhope is a holiday destination during the New Zealand summer, with several kilometres of safe swimming beaches. The western end of the beach, commonly known as West End is popular for surfing during the summer and Christmas period. Visitors can explore walking and cycling tracks, including the scenic Ōhope Scenic Reserve Track and Ōhope Harbourside Trail, which offers views of the coastline, native bush and Ōhiwa Harbour. Ōhope Beach has earned recognition as one of New Zealand's most cherished coastal destinations through various accolades over the years. In 2014, it was voted the country's most loved beach, securing nearly 100,000 of the over 600,000 votes cast in a social media campaign by the Automobile Association. More recently, in 2024, Ōhope Beach was honored as the best family beach for the third consecutive year in the New Zealand Herald's Best Beach competition. The beach also secured second place in the best camping beach category. Ōhope Beach Top 10 Holiday Park, is a major attraction for both locals and visitors, especially during the summer months. The park offers a range of accommodations, including campgrounds, cabins, and powered sites.

== Infrastructure ==
=== Education ===
Ōhope Beach School is a co-educational school for Years 1 to 6, with a roll of 218 as of July 2026. A school was approved for Ōhope Beach in 1947 Progress was slow, partly due to finding a suitable site. The school opened in 1951.

=== Transportation ===
The town is also serviced by public transport links via Baybus operated by the Bay of Plenty Regional Council to nearby Whakatāne via the 122 bus route. Private cars, limited public transport and taxis (as well as cycling and walking) are the primary modes of transport for residents. Ōhope is primarily connected to Whakatāne through Ōhope Road, a two-lane route with passing lanes on the hill inclines. It is also linked to the south via the Pacific Coast Highway, providing access to Tāneatua and Ōpōtiki.

=== Facilities ===
The town offers a range of amenities, including cafes, shops, and recreational facilities. To the east, facilities such as the Port Ōhope Wharf, Ōhope Library, Ōhope Fire Station, Ōhope Beach Top 10 Holiday Park and an aged care facility are present. Ōhope is the main venue for the Local Wild Food Festival, a celebration of local produce and unique culinary experiences. The festival, which draws food lovers from across the region, showcases a variety of wild and foraged foods, with a focus on sustainable and eco-friendly dining.

== Gallery ==
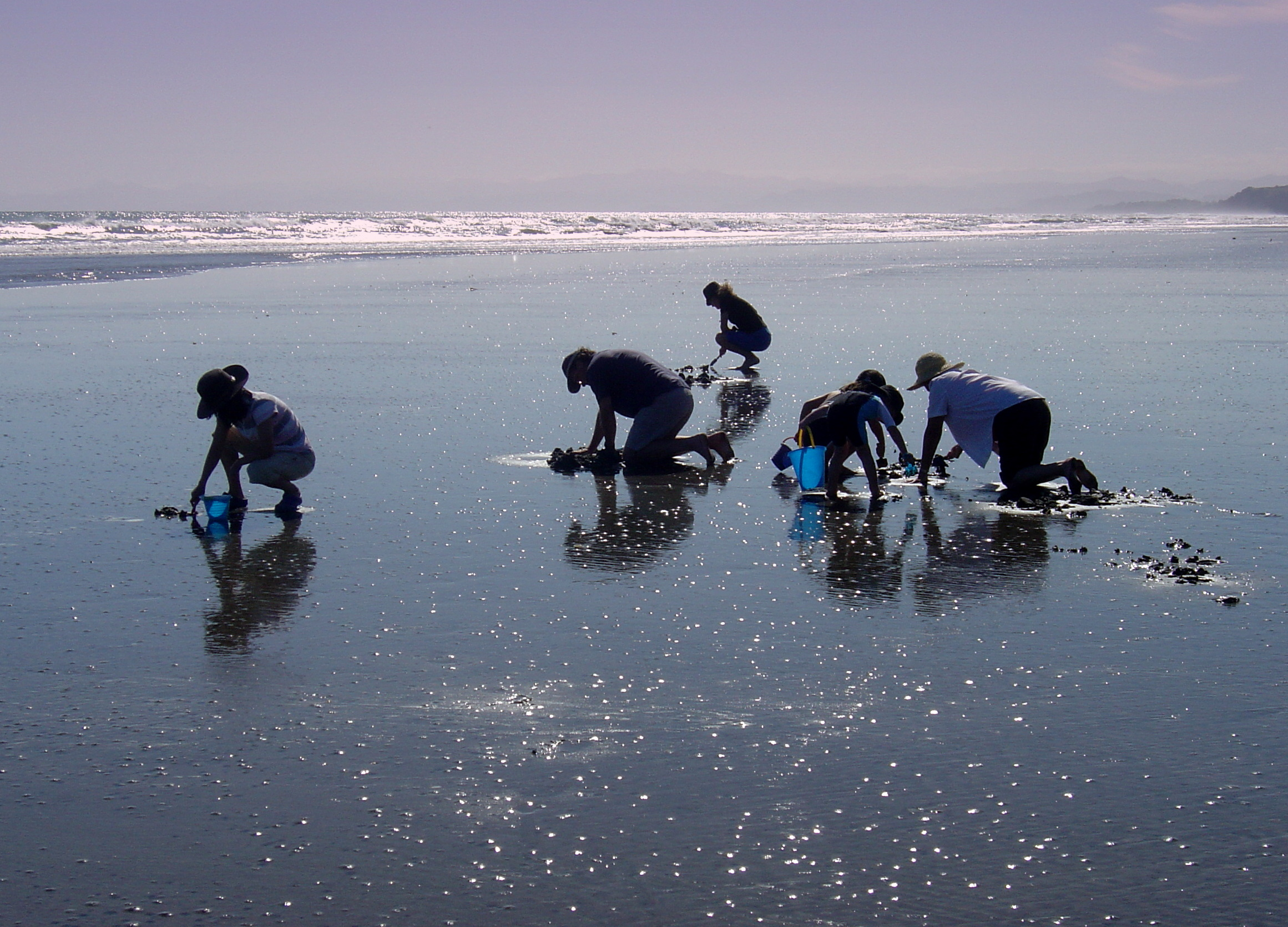
Digging for tuatua on Ōhope Beach in summer

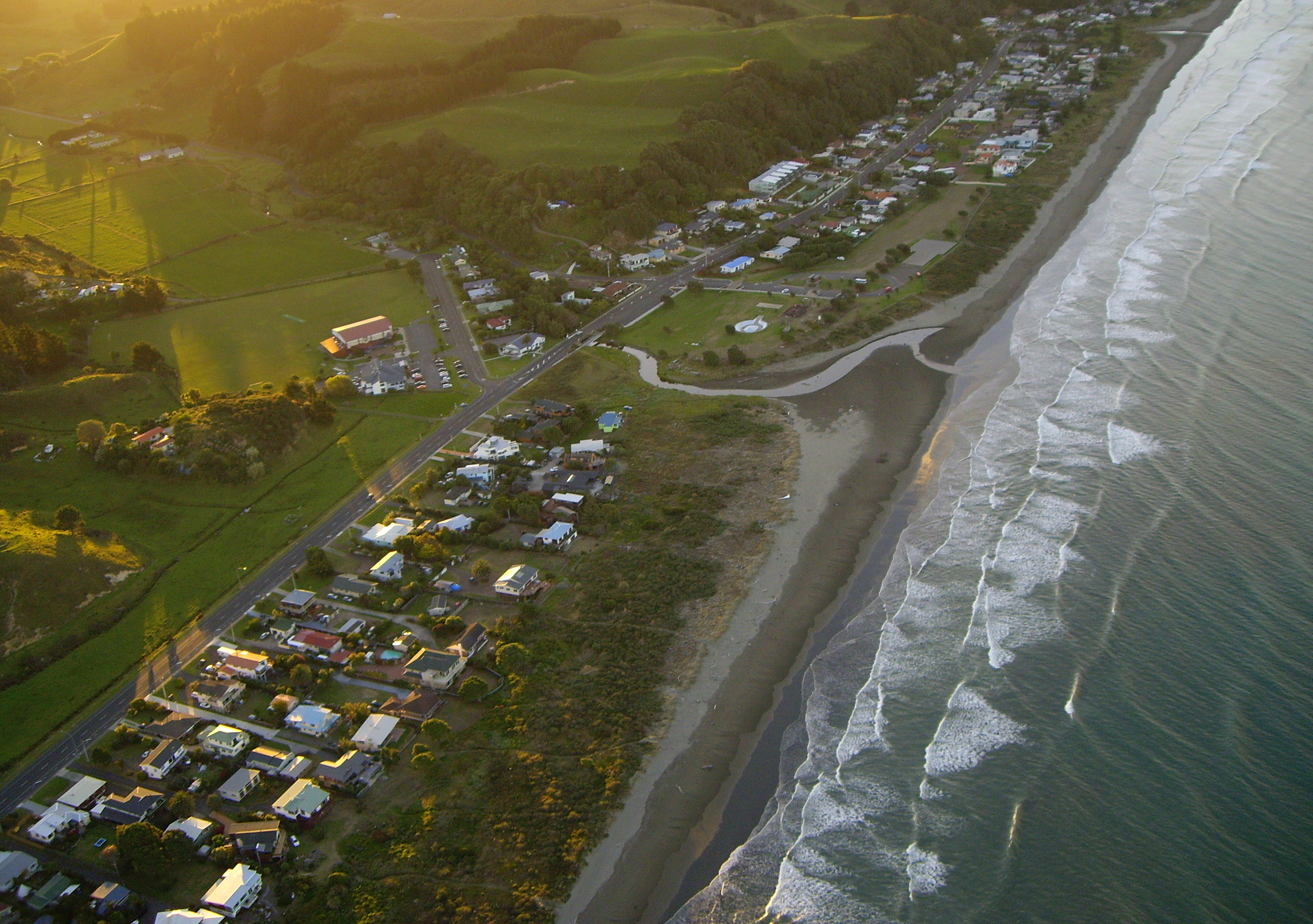
Ōhope from above

== Climate ==
Climate data for Port Ohope (1981–2010)
Month	Jan	Feb	Mar	Apr	May	Jun	Jul	Aug	Sep	Oct	Nov	Dec	Year
Mean daily maximum °C (°F)	23.8 (74.8)	24.3 (75.7)	22.8 (73.0)	20.3 (68.5)	17.7 (63.9)	15.4 (59.7)	14.9 (58.8)	15.5 (59.9)	16.9 (62.4)	18.4 (65.1)	20.0 (68.0)	22.0 (71.6)	19.3 (66.8)
Daily mean °C (°F)	19.5 (67.1)	20.1 (68.2)	18.5 (65.3)	16.0 (60.8)	13.5 (56.3)	11.2 (52.2)	10.6 (51.1)	11.1 (52.0)	12.7 (54.9)	14.2 (57.6)	15.9 (60.6)	18.0 (64.4)	15.1 (59.2)
Mean daily minimum °C (°F)	15.3 (59.5)	15.9 (60.6)	14.1 (57.4)	11.7 (53.1)	9.4 (48.9)	7.1 (44.8)	6.3 (43.3)	6.7 (44.1)	8.4 (47.1)	10.1 (50.2)	11.9 (53.4)	14.0 (57.2)	10.9 (51.6)
Average rainfall mm (inches)	82.0 (3.23)	72.5 (2.85)	75.7 (2.98)	72.7 (2.86)	71.0 (2.80)	108.9 (4.29)	84.5 (3.33)	104.5 (4.11)	80.3 (3.16)	88.5 (3.48)	86.2 (3.39)	74.6 (2.94)	1,001.4 (39.42)
Mean monthly sunshine hours	240.1	207.9	195.7	198.1	164.4	132.4	159.9	160.2	172.5	193.3	202.1	234.1	2,260.7
Source: NIWA
