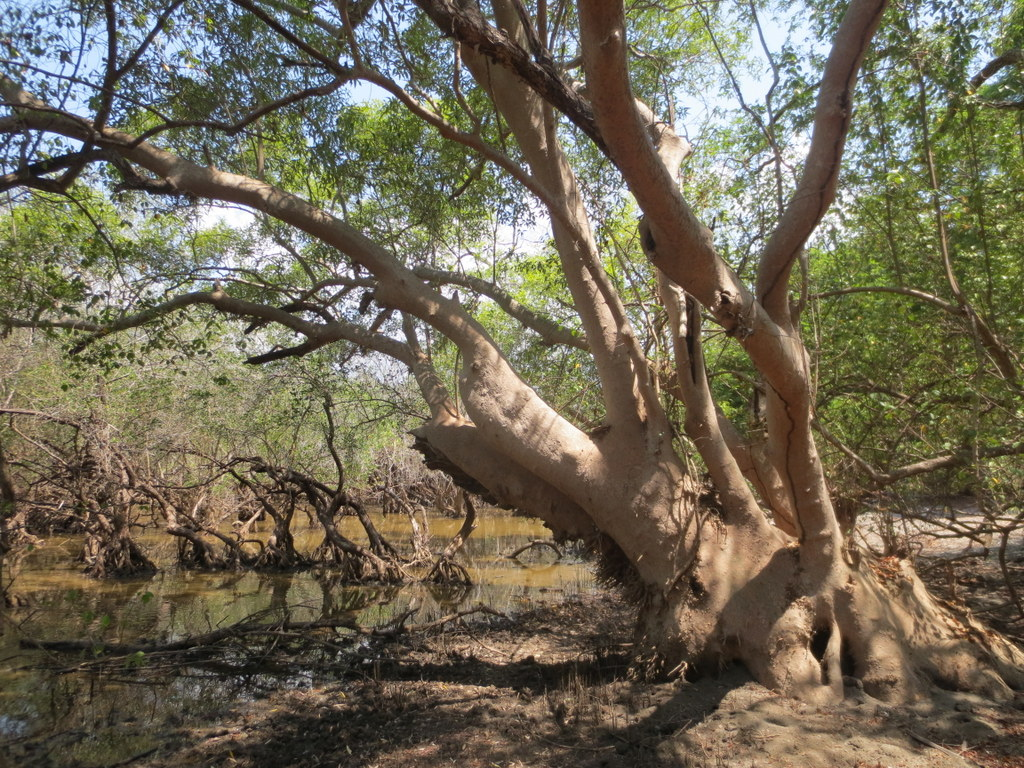
- At Lago Malai, East Timor

Conservation status
- Least Concern (IUCN 3.1)

Scientific classification
- Kingdom: Plantae
- Clade: Tracheophytes
- Clade: Angiosperms
- Clade: Eudicots
- Clade: Asterids
- Order: Lamiales
- Family: Acanthaceae
- Genus: Avicennia
- Species: A. marina

Binomial name
- Avicennia marina (Forssk.) Vierh.

Subspecies and varieties
- See text.

Synonyms
- Avicennia alba Blume; Avicennia intermedia Griff.; Avicennia mindanaensis Elmer; Avicennia sphaerocarpa Stapf ex Ridl.; Avicennia spicata Kuntze; Sceura marina Forssk.

= Avicennia marina =

Species of plant

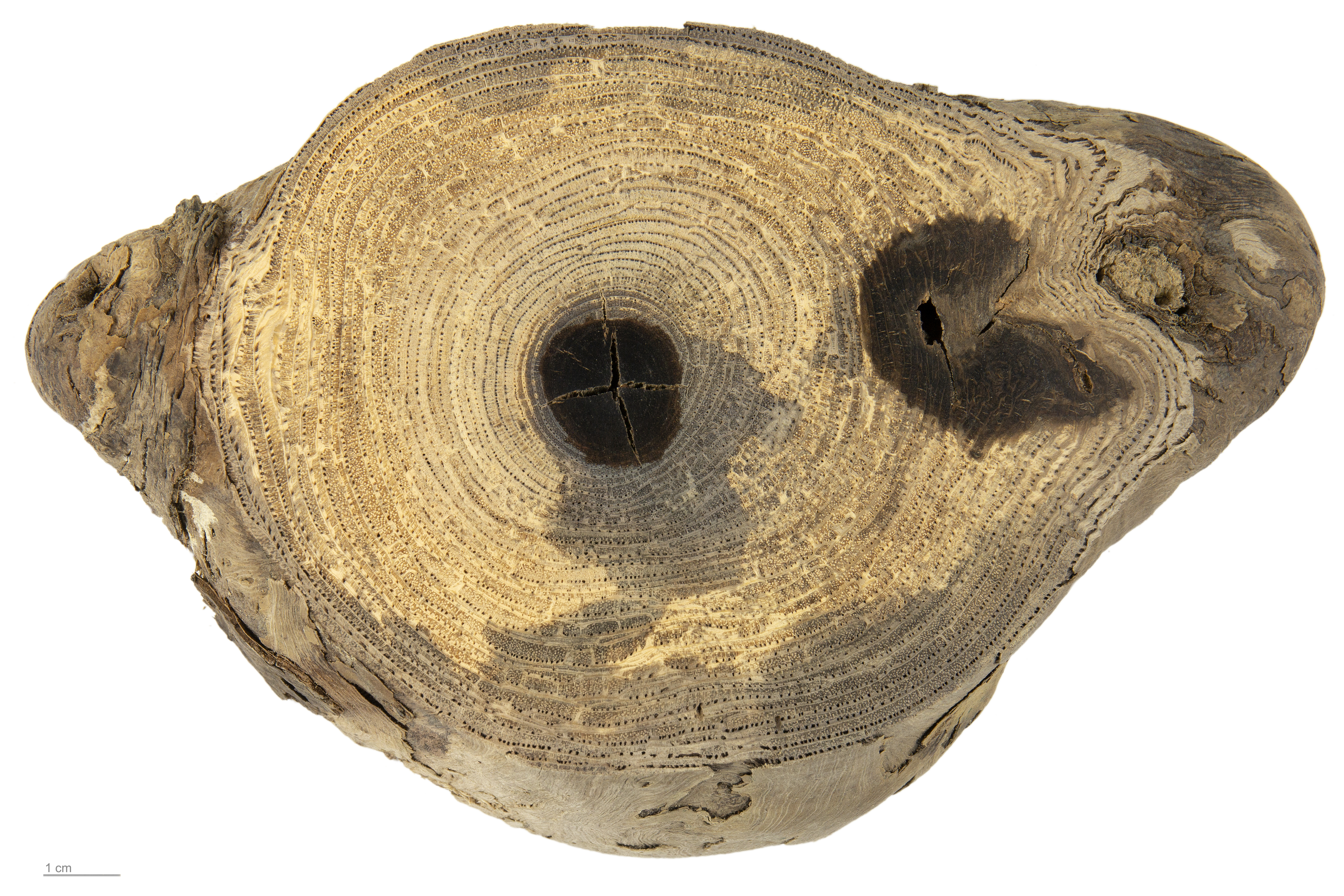
Avicennia marina (MHNT)

Avicennia marina, commonly known as grey mangrove or white mangrove, is a species of mangrove tree classified in the plant family Acanthaceae (formerly in the Verbenaceae or Avicenniaceae). As with other mangroves, it occurs in the intertidal zones of estuarine areas.

== Description ==
Grey mangroves grow as a shrub or tree to a height of 3 to 10 m (10 to 33 ft), or up to 14 metres (46 ft) in tropical regions. The habit is a gnarled arrangement of multiple branches. It has smooth light-grey bark made up of thin, stiff, brittle flakes. This may be whitish, a characteristic described in the common name. The leaves are thick, 5 to 8 cm (2.0 to 3.1 in) long, a bright, glossy green on the upper surface, and silvery-white, or grey, with very small matted hairs on the surface below. As with other Avicennia species, it has aerial roots (pneumatophores), which grow to a height of about 20 cm (7.9 in), and a diameter of 1 cm (0.4 in). These allow the plant to absorb oxygen, which is deficient in its habitat. These roots also anchor the plant during the frequent inundation of seawater in the soft substrate of tidal systems. The flowers range from white to a golden yellow colour, are less than 1 cm (0.4 in) across, and occur in clusters of three to five. The fruit contains large cotyledons that surround the new stem of a seedling. This produces a large, fleshy seed, often germinating on the tree and falling as a seedling. The grey mangrove can experience stunted growth in water conditions that are too saline, but thrive to their full height in waters where both salt and fresh water are present. The species can tolerate high salinity by excreting salts through its leaves.

The grey mangrove is a highly variable tree, with a number of ecotypes, and in forms closely resembling other species. It has been reported to tolerate extreme weather conditions, high winds, and various pests and diseases. It is a pioneer in muddy soil conditions with a pH value of 6.5 to 8.0, but is intolerant of shade.

== Subdivision ==
A number of botanists have proposed division of the species, but currently three subspecies and one variety are recognised:

- A. m. subsp. australasica (Walp.) J.Everett
- A. m. subsp. eucalyptifolia (Valeton) J.Everett
- A. m. subsp. marina
- A. m. var. rumphiana (Hallier f.) Bakh., syn. Avicennia lanata Ridl., Avicennia rumphiana Hallier f.

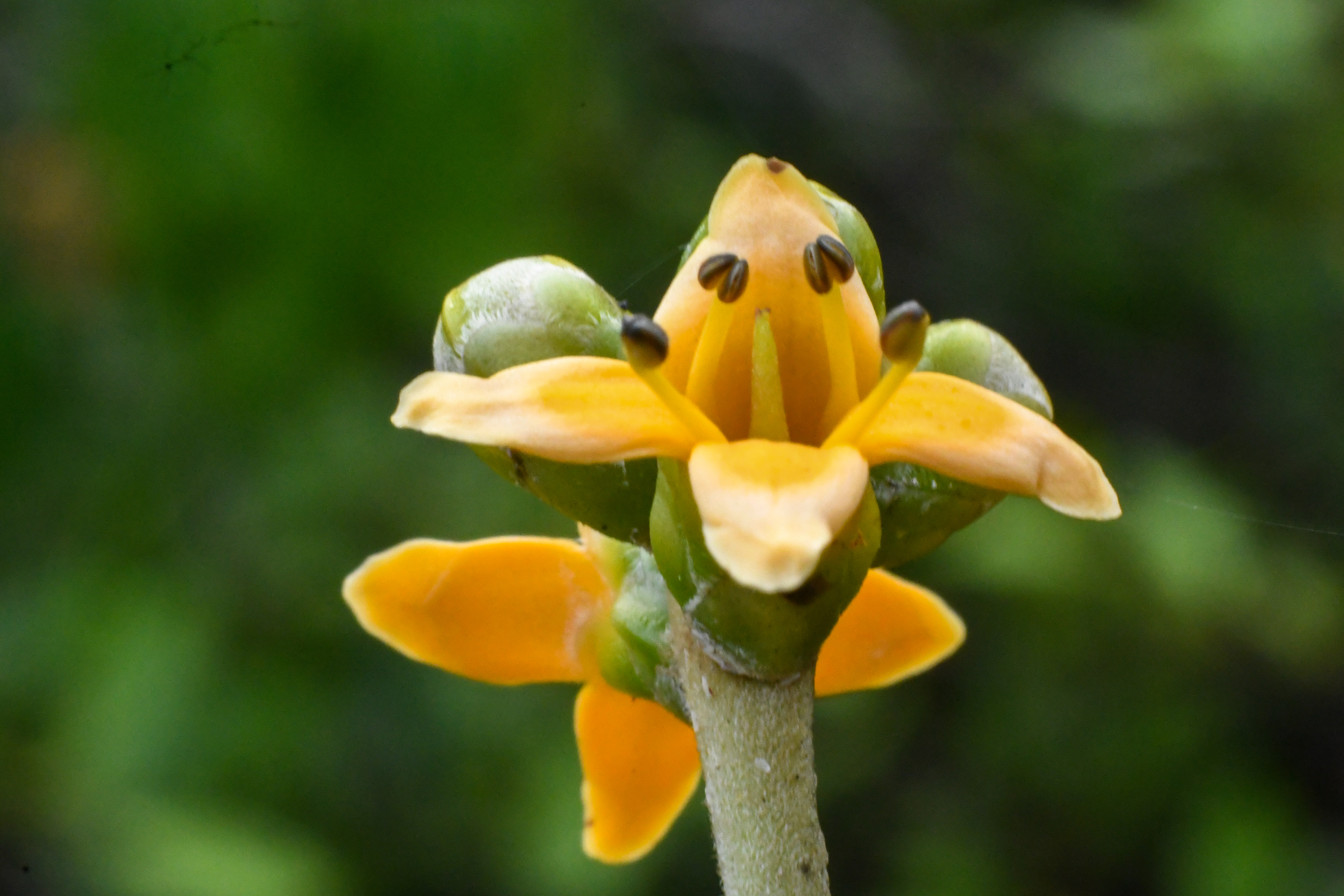
Flower

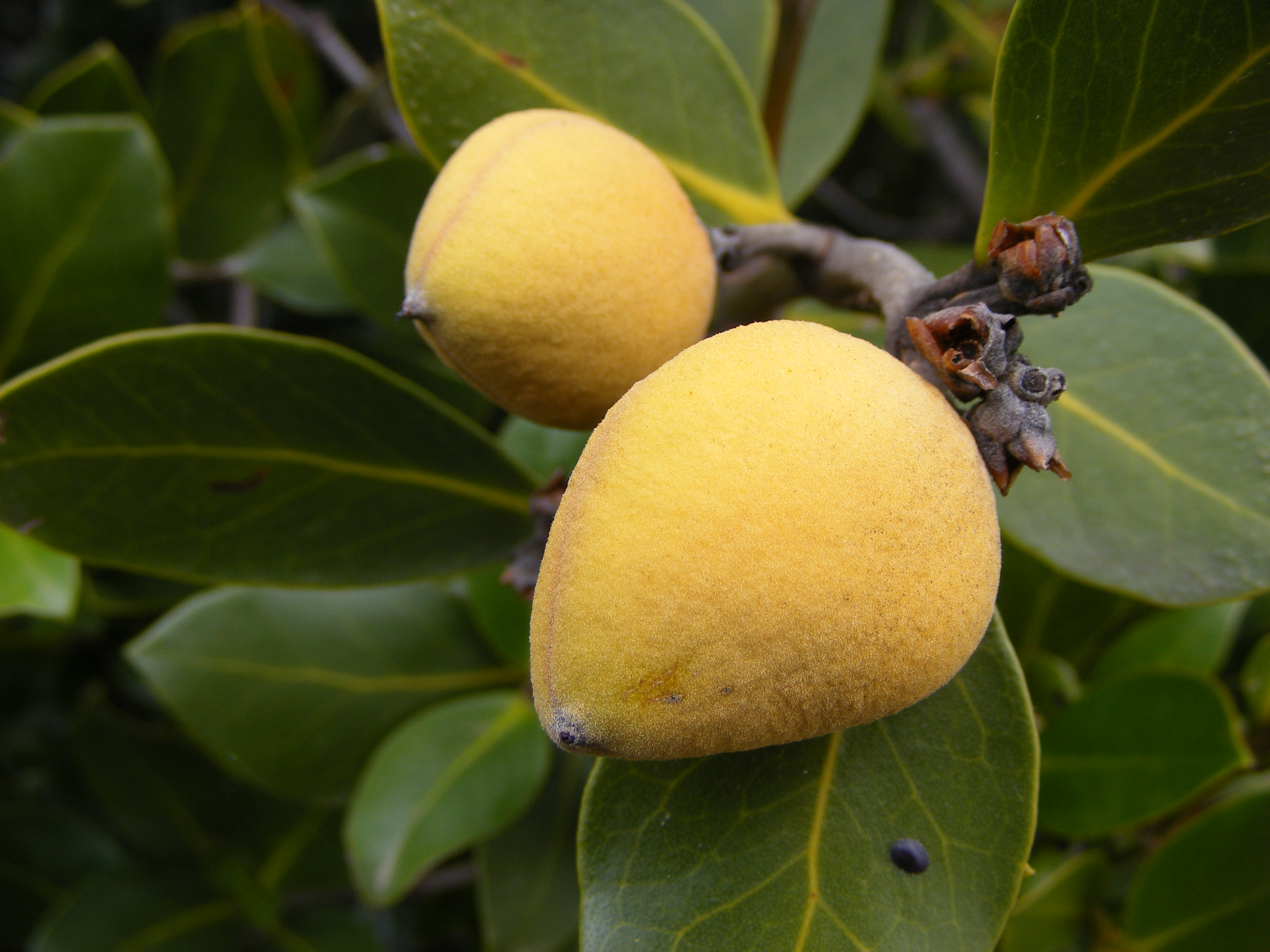
Avicennia marina fruit

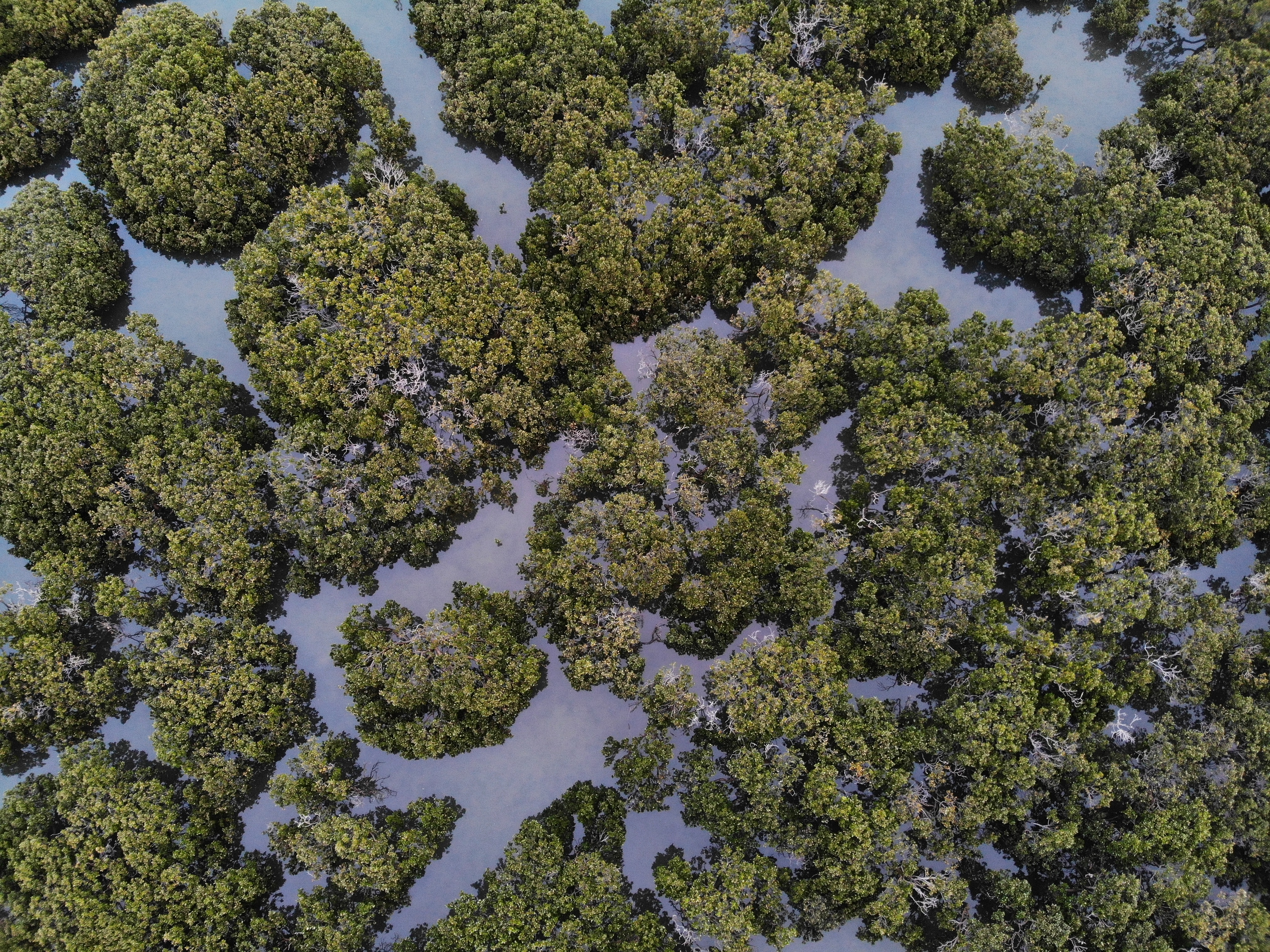
A. marina in Westernport Bay, Victoria

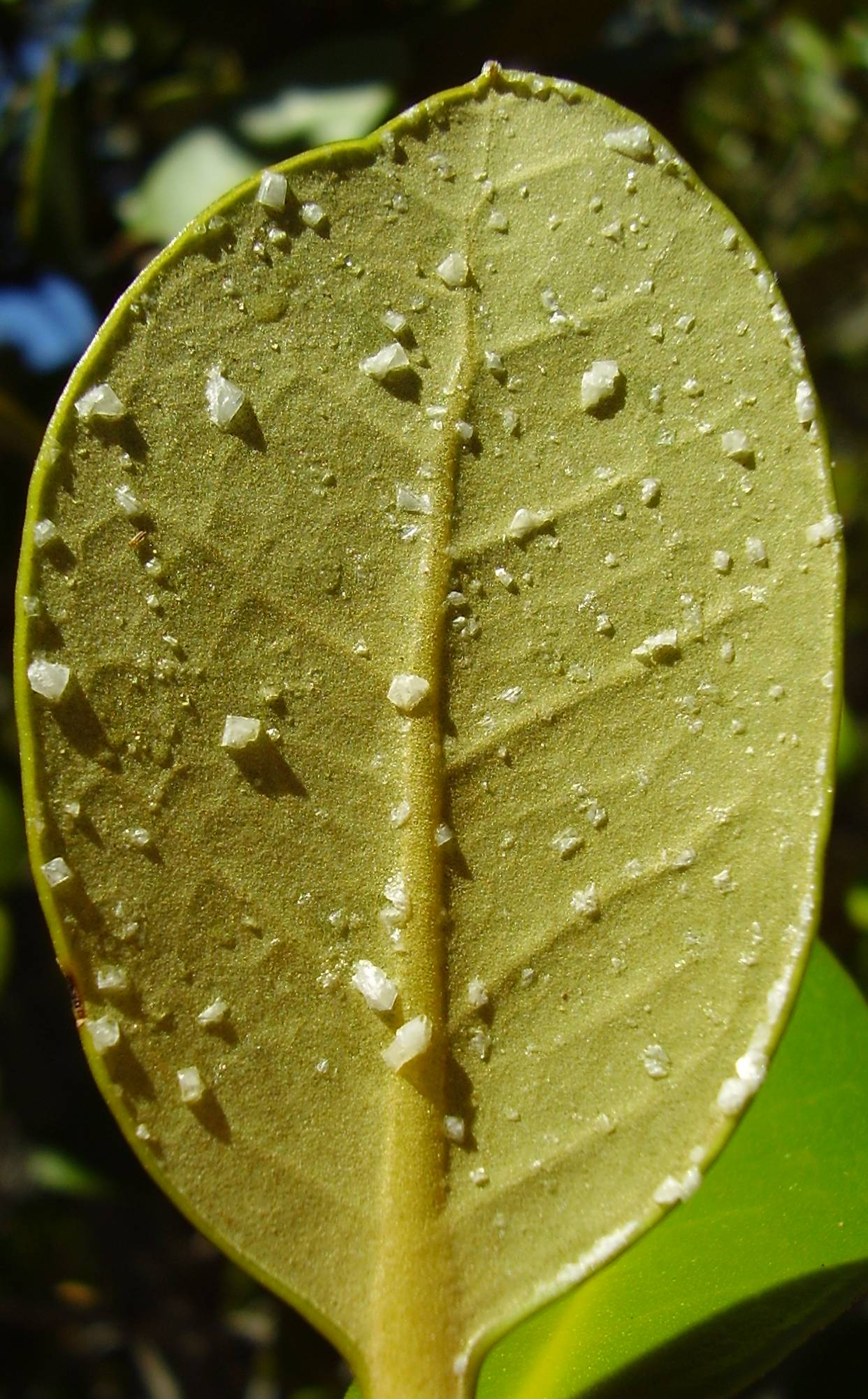
Excreted salt on the underside of a Avicennia marina var. resinifera leaf

== Distribution ==
It is distributed along Africa's east coast, south-west, south and south-east Asia, Australia, and northern parts of New Zealand. It is one of the few mangroves found in the arid regions of the coastal Arabian Peninsula, mainly in sabkha environments in the United Arab Emirates, Qatar, Bahrain, Oman, as well as in similar environments on both side of the Red Sea (in Yemen, Saudi Arabia, Egypt, Eritrea, and Sudan), and Qatar and southern Iran along the Persian Gulf coast. It is a characteristic species of the Southern Africa mangroves ecoregion, and is one of three species present in Africa's southernmost mangroves, in the estuary of South Africa's Nahoon River at 32°56′S. The species is also found in Somalia.

=== Australia ===
In Australia it occurs in every mainland state and extends much farther south than other mangroves, with its southern most limit at Corner Inlet (38°45′S) near Wilson's Promontory in Victoria. Its distribution is disjunct in Western Australia; the population of the Abrolhos Islands is 300 km (190 mi) further south than the nearest population of Shark Bay. Another mangrove system is found 500 km (310 mi) further south at Bunbury. This colonisation of southerly climes may have occurred relatively recently, perhaps several thousand years ago, when they were transferred by the Leeuwin Current. The most inland occurrence of mangroves in Australia is a stand of grey mangroves in the Mandora Marsh, some 60 km (37 mi) from the coast. In South Australia along the Barker Inlet and Port River in Gulf St Vincent, as well as in sheltered bays in Spencer Gulf and the west coast of Eyre Peninsula, A. marina forests form hatcheries for much of the state's fish and shellfish commercial and recreational fisheries.

=== New Zealand ===
In New Zealand, Avicennia marina var. australasica is the only mangrove species. It grows in the top half of the North Island, between 34 and 38 degrees south, making it the world's most southern mangrove. Avicennia marina was known in New Zealand as Avicennia marina var. resinifera until recently; its Māori name is mānawa.

Mangroves likely came to New Zealand in Miocene, but the earliest pollen of Avicennia marina in New Zealand is from 14,000 years ago. Lower winter temperatures limit the height of mangrove plants, so while the plants growing on the northern tip of the North Island can approach 10 m, the mangroves from the southern fringes of the habitat only reach 0.5–1 m. As of 2018, they are spread from the tip of the North Island until Kawhia Harbour on the west coast and Ohiwa Harbour on the east. In New Zealand, Avicennia marina form multi-level ecosystems with Zostera muelleri seagrass growing at the lower elevation, mangroves occupying the flooded middle, with herbs and succulents such as Sarcocornia quinqueﬂora, Selliera radicans, Juncus kraussii and Leptocarpus similis spread across the saltmarsh and salt meadows.

Māori valued mangroves as a source of seafood from early times. Early European settlement first caused a large-scale loss of habitat for mangroves due to industrial use of coastal land, but later agricultural practices and deforestation led to erosion and resulted in 50–80-fold increase in sedimentation in estuaries; due to these changes, the mangroves have spread considerably from the mid-20 century. The spread of Avicennia marina is commonly viewed as a problem because they make sailing harder and decrease the price of housing in coastal areas; they are often removed with the consent of the local government. The speed and extent of this process is negatively assessed by researchers who note that Avicennia marina sequester carbon from the atmosphere, protect the coast from erosion and become an important habitat for estuarine fauna. New Zealand mangrove ecosystems have no unique species, but they support many arthtopods such as ants, bettles and spiders; rats and mice; snails, eels, shrimp and fish; as well as a large number of coastal birds. Among other reasons for the negative perception of Avicennia marina are the speed of its spread that occurred in living memory of the community residents and the belief that the mangroves decrease the diversity of shellfish (which is caused by sedimentation, not the mangroves themselves). There is no data indicating that the removal of mangroves removes the mud and restores the ecosystem back into a sandflat; the large-scale physical removals in Tauranga Harbour and Whangamata Harbour left degraded mudflat ecosystems with more frequent macroalgal blooms instead of the expected the return of seagrass and shellfish beds.

== Ecology ==
The lichen Pyrenula dalmatioides, found in the northern North Island of New Zealand, is known to grow almost exclusively on the bark of A. marina.
