= Ōhiwa Harbour =

Harbour in the Bay of Plenty, New Zealand

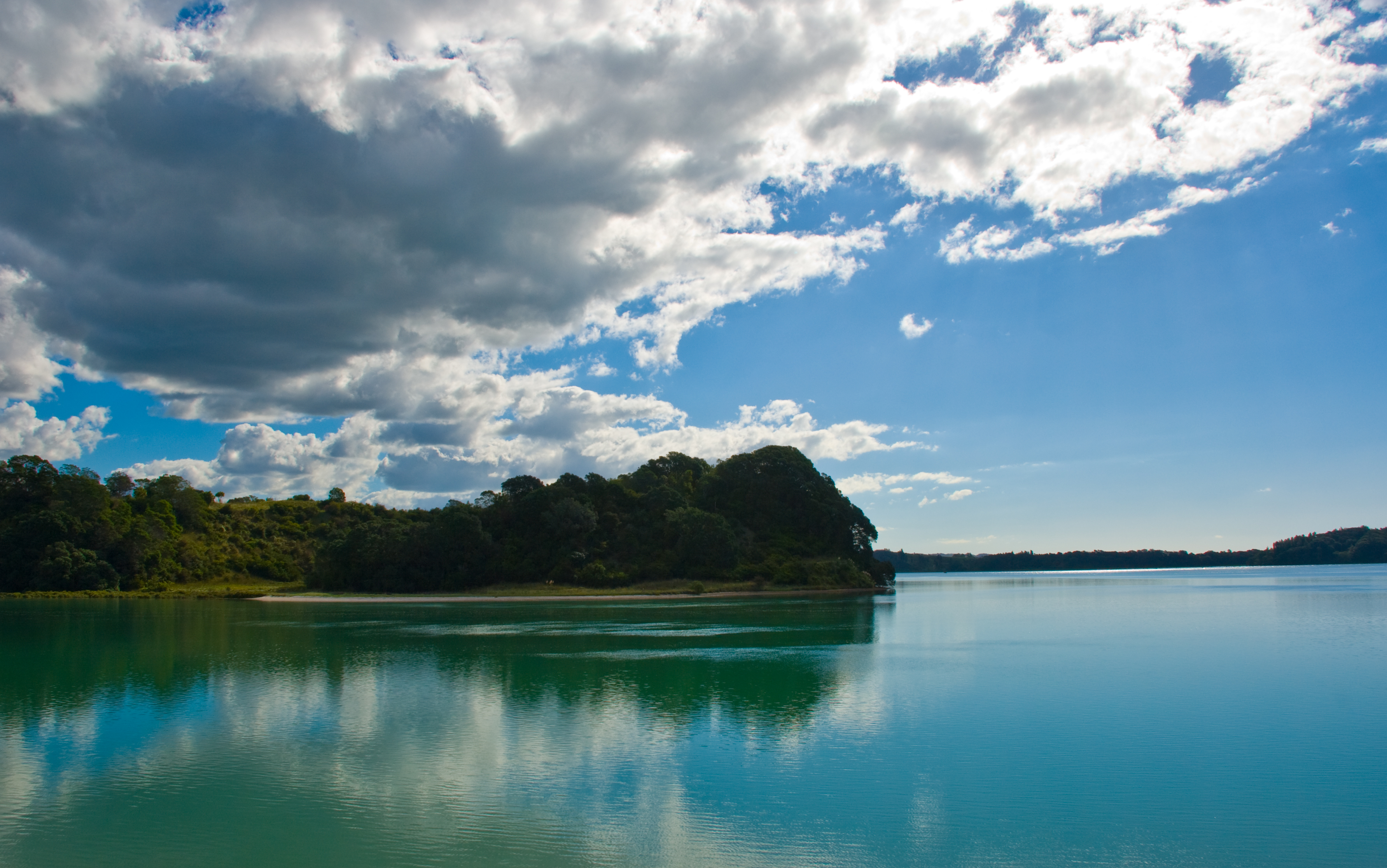

- Location within New Zealand
- Interactive map of Ōhiwa Harbour
- Location: Bay of Plenty Region, New Zealand
- Coordinates: 37.991°S 177.094°E
- Ocean/sea sources: Pacific Ocean
- Basin countries: New Zealand
- Surface area: 26 km^{2} (10 sq mi)
- Islands: Hokianga Island, Motuotu Island, Ohakana Island, Pataua Island, Uretara Island, Whangakopikopiko Island
- Settlements: Kutarere, Ōhiwa, Ōhope, Wainui

Ōhiwa Harbour is a natural harbour in New Zealand. It is located between the settlement of Ōhope in the Whakatāne District and Ōhiwa in the Ōpōtiki District of the Bay of Plenty Region, New Zealand.

== Geography ==
The Ōhiwa Harbour is a drowned valley system. The bedrock of the Ōhiwa Harbour consists predominantly of greywacke, and dates from the Late Jurassic to the Late Cretaceous periods. The overlying deposits date from the Pleistocene, as well as pumice and volcanic ash from volcanic eruptions from the Rotorua and Taupo volcanic centres. In prehistoric times, the harbour was fed by a river larger than the current tributaries that enter the harbour. The harbour's catchment is a mix of farmland and remnant coastal forest, dominated by pōhutukawa and pūriri, and features a remnant sea-level stand of an alpine southern beech (Nothofagus solandri) exists at the head of the harbour.

Onekawa Te Mawhai Regional Park is located on the northeastern shores of the harbour.

The Ōhiwa Harbour has two spits on either side of its entrance to the Bay of Plenty, an unusual feature of an estuary. Eventually, the harbour will completely fill with sediment and become dry land, a process which has accelerated due to human activities.

The Nukuhou River is a major tributary of the Ōhiwa Harbour. Six islands are found within the harbour: Hokianga Island, Motuotu Island, Ohakana Island, Pataua Island, Uretara Island and Whangakopikopiko Island.

The Ōhiwa Harbour is the traditional northern extent of Te Urewera.

== Ecology ==
The harbour is home to shellfish and fish species, as well as wading and migratory birds and North Island brown kiwi. The harbour features large areas of seagrass. The streams which feed into the harbour are a habitat for native freshwater fish, including inanga.

Rats and stoats are predators that live near the Ōhiwa Harbour margins, which impact native bird populations.

== History ==
The Māori iwi Whakatōhea are the traditional residents of the Ōhiwa Harbour area. The harbour was traditionally known as Nga Tamāhine a Te Whakatōhea ("Daughter of Te Whakatōhea") because it supplied the iwi with fish and shellfish. It is also known as "the food basket of the peoples", because of the food Ngāi Tūhoe and Ngāti Awa were able to gather from the area.

Early European settlers worked as ship builders at Ōhiwa in the 1840s and 1850s. After the Volkner Incident in 1865 during the New Zealand Wars, British forces invaded the area. In January 1866, the Crown announced wide-scale land confuscations of Whakatōhea land and land belonging to surrounding iwi, leading to European settlement of the area. In response, Whakatōhea chief Hira te Popo and Tuhoe chief Eru Tamaikowha used guerilla warfare tactics against the settlers. The Crown established native reserves at Ōhiwa Harbour for Whakatōhea, at Hiwarau and on Hokianga Island.

In 1873, the Ferry Hotel was established at the Ōhiwa sandspit, and a ferry service began to operate between Ōhiwa and Ōhope. The settlement grew, but in 1915 much of the town was destroyed due to erosion of the sandspit. A second attempt to create sections for baches in the 1960s was also lost to erosion in 1978.

In 1999, four breeding pairs of North Island brown kiwi were identified living in reserves on the shores of the Ōhiwa Harbour near Ōhope. This led to the Department of Conservation creating a breeding programme, the Whakatane Kiwi Project, which led to more than 300 chicks being raised in or released to reserves bordering the Ōhiwa Harbour.

In 2008, the Ōhiwa Harbour Implementation Forum was established as a collaboration between local government bodies and iwi with interests in the Ōhiwa Harbour area, to implement solutions to improve the environment of the harbour. One of the major projects launched by the forum was to re-establish kuku (New Zealand green-lipped mussels), which had significantly declined in the harbour due to unsustainable growth in Coscinasterias calamaria (eleven-armed sea stars). The project led an increase in mussel numbers from 80,000 in 2019 to 45 million in 2024.

== Gallery ==
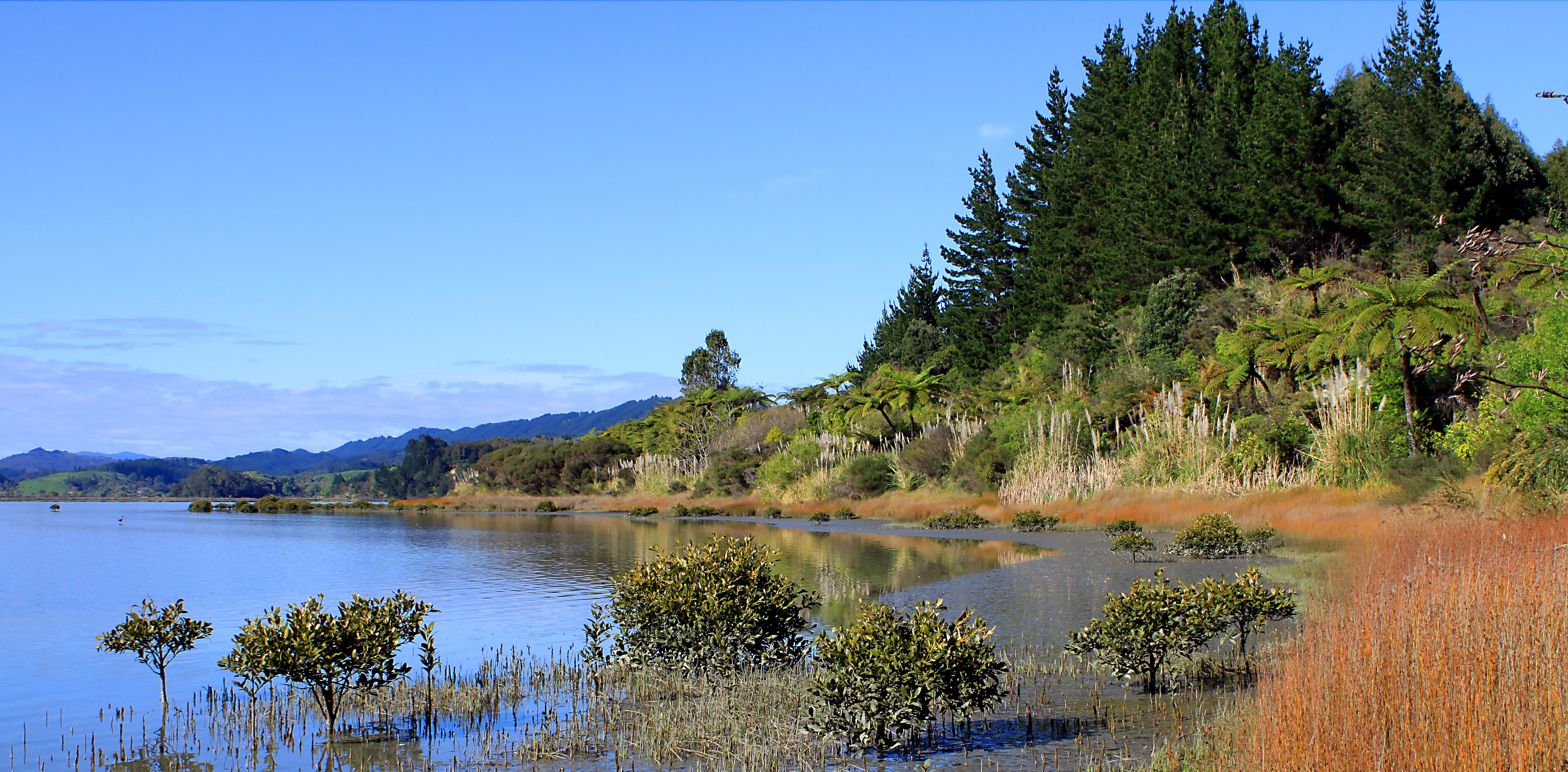
Western Ōhiwa Harbour

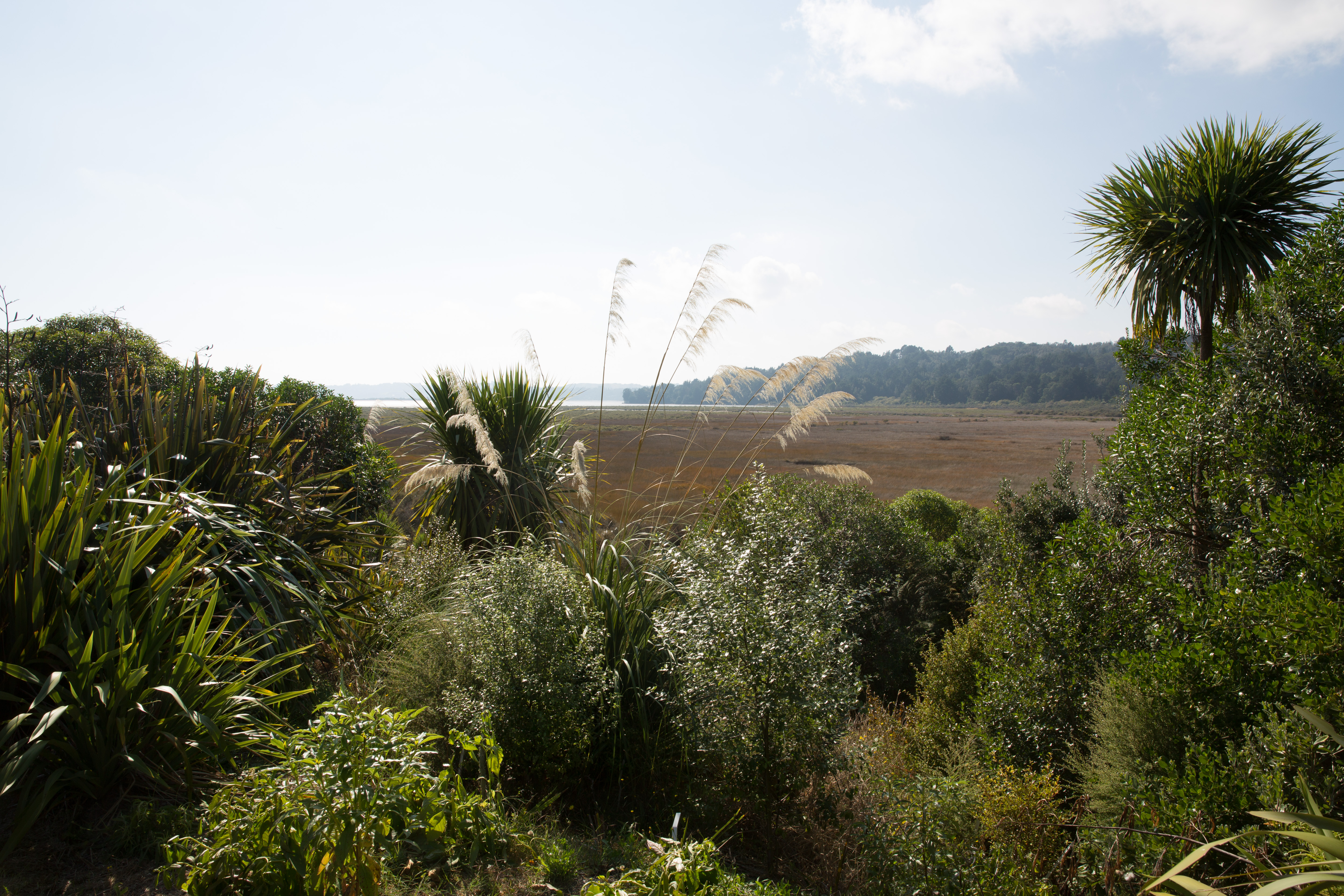
Nukuhou Salt Marsh near the mouth of the Nukuhou River

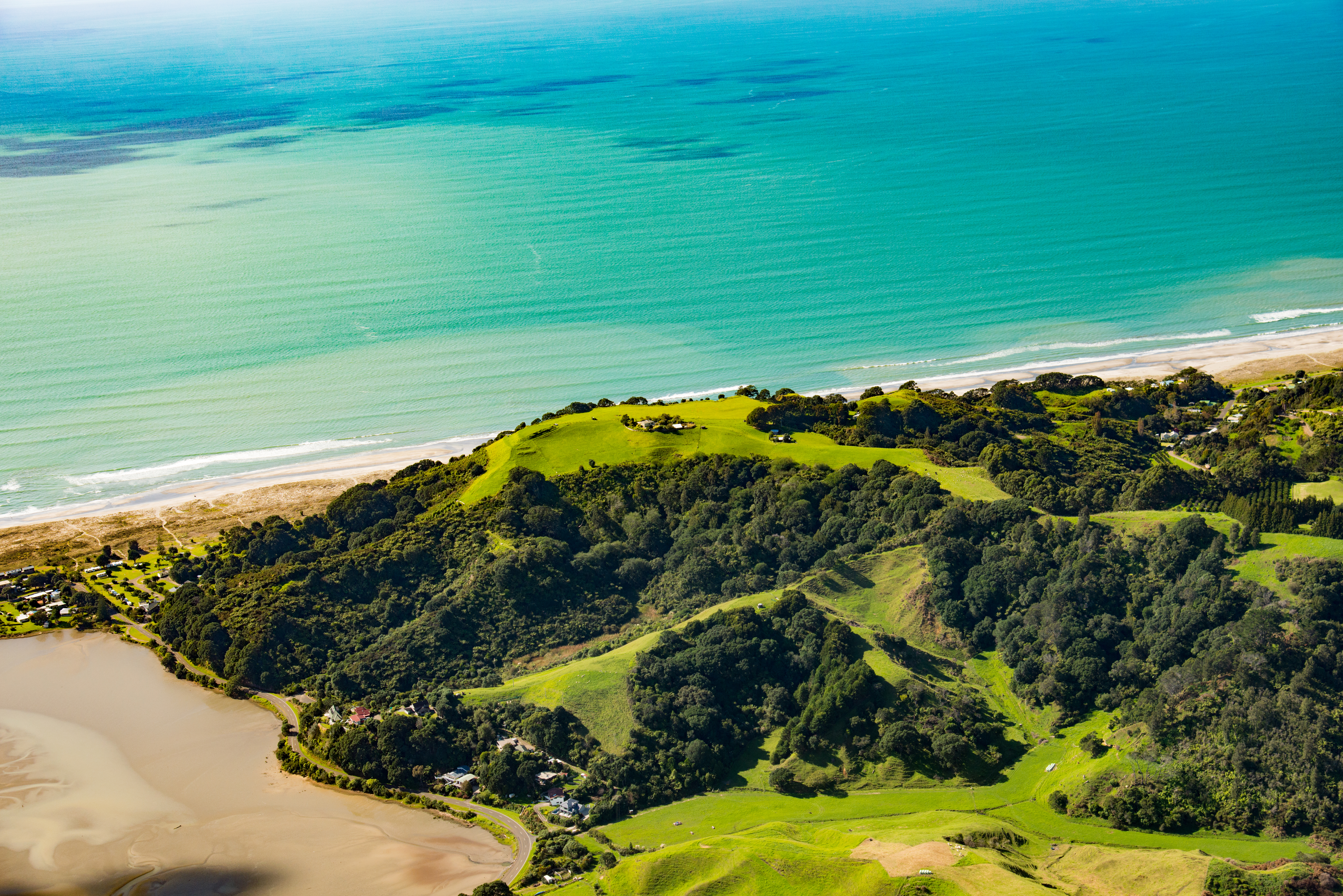
Onekawa Te Mawhai Regional Park to the northeast of the Ōhiwa Harbour
