= Suppression =

Suppression may refer to:

== Laws ==
- Suppression of Communism Act
- Suppression order a type of censorship where a court rules that certain information cannot be published
- Tohunga Suppression Act 1907, an Act of the Parliament of New Zealand aimed to replace tohunga as traditional Māori healers with "modern" medicine

== Mathematics and science ==
=== Biology, psychology and healthcare ===
- Suppression (eye), of an eye is a subconscious adaptation by a person's brain to eliminate the symptoms of disorders of binocular vision such as strabismus, convergence insufficiency and aniseikonia
- Appetite suppression
- Bone marrow suppression, the decrease in cells responsible for providing immunity, carrying oxygen, and those responsible for normal blood clotting
- Cough medicine, which may contain a cough suppressant, a medicinal drug used in an attempt to treat coughing
- Expressive suppression, a psychological aspect of emotion regulation
- Flash suppression, a phenomenon of visual perception in which an image presented to one eye is suppressed by a flash of another image presented to the other eye
- Genetic suppression
- Suppressor mutation, in which a gene inhibits the expression of another
- Reflux suppressant, in medicine
- Suppression subtractive hybridization, in biochemistry
- Thought suppression, the psychological process of deliberately trying to stop thinking about certain thoughts, associated with obsessive-compulsive disorder

=== Other uses in mathematics and science ===
- Compton suppression, in nuclear physics
- Zero suppression, in mathematics and information theory

== Politics ==
- Censorship, the suppression of public communication considered objectionable to the general body of people as determined by a government or media outlet
- Suppression of dissent, occurs when an individual or group tries to censor, persecute or otherwise oppress the other party rather than communicate logically
- Suppression of evidence, the act of preventing evidence from being shown in a trial
- Voter suppression, a strategy to influence the outcome of an election by discouraging or preventing people from exercising their right to vote
- Catch and kill, buying exclusive publication rights to an individual's story, and then suppressing the information

== Religion ==
- Suppression (parish), the forced closure of a Catholic parish or association
- Religious intolerance, or religious suppression, intolerance against another's religious beliefs or practices by individuals, private groups, government agencies or the whole government
- Suppressive Person, a Church of Scientology concept discussed in the book, The Cause of Suppression

== Technology ==
- Electromagnetic interference suppression, e.g., of electrical noise from switches and motors
- Fire suppression system
  - Firefighting, involves the suppression of fire
- Free energy suppression and other suppressed technology
- Silence suppression, in telephony
- Transient-voltage-suppression diode, an electronic component used to protect sensitive electronics from voltage spikes induced on connected wires

== Weapons ==
- Suppressive fire, weapons fire that degrades the performance of a target below the level needed to fulfill its mission
- Suppressor, a device attached to or part of the barrel of a firearm which reduces the amount of noise and flash generated by firing the weapon

== Other uses ==
- Suppressed correlative, a logical fallacy
