= Rua Kēnana Pardon Act 2019 =

Act of Parliament in New Zealand

Te Ture kia Unuhia te Hara kai Runga i a Rua Kēnana 2019 / Rua Kēnana Pardon Act 2019

New Zealand Parliament
- Citation: Rua Kēnana Pardon Act 2019
- Royal assent: 21 December 2019

Legislative history
- Introduced by: Nanaia Mahuta
- Introduced: 22 August 2019
- First reading: 12 September 2019
- Second reading: 18 December 2019
- Third reading: 18 December 2019
- Status: Current legislation

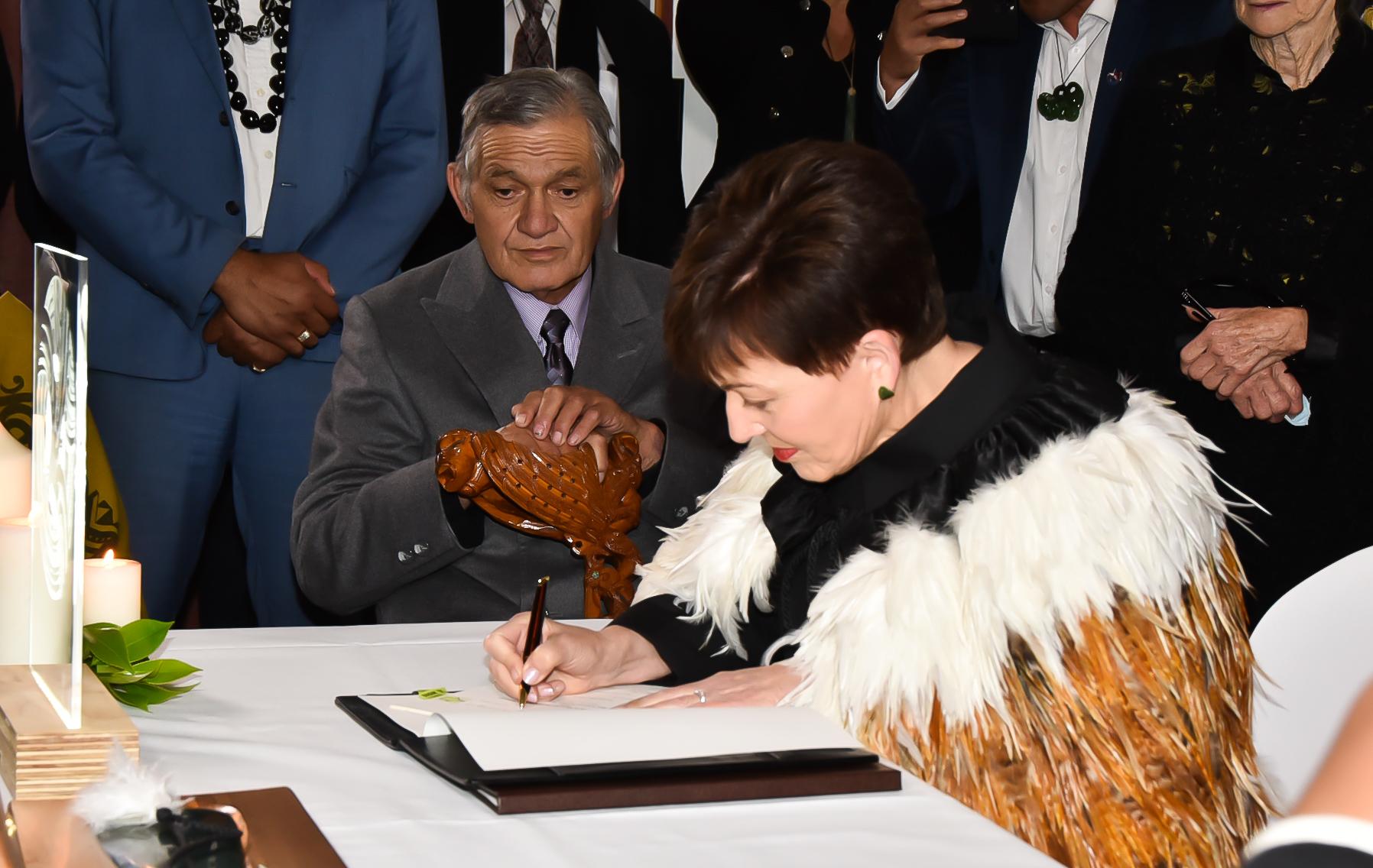
Governor-General Dame Patsy Reddy gives royal assent to the Rua Kēnana Pardon Act at Maungapōhatu on 21 December 2019, while Tūheitia, the Māori king, watches on.

Te Ture kia Unuhia te Hara kai Runga i a Rua Kēnana 2019 / Rua Kēnana Pardon Act 2019 is a statute of the New Zealand Parliament that provides a pardon for the Tūhoe prophet Rua Kēnana (1869–1937).

The act gives effect to an agreement between the Crown and Ngā Toenga o Ngā Tamariki a Iharaira me Ngā Uri o Maungapōhatu Charitable Trust signed on 9 September 2017, which was in turn based on the Waitangi Tribunal's 6 part WAI894 Te Urewera report.

The act contains historical background, acknowledgements made by the Crown, an apology made by the Crown, the pardon itself and the 'declaration that the character, mana, and reputation of Rua Kēnana, his uri, and Ngā Toenga o Ngā Tamariki o Iharaira Faith are restored.'

The text of the legislation is fully bilingual in English and Māori.
