= Arthur Breckon =

New Zealand photojournalist (1887–1965)

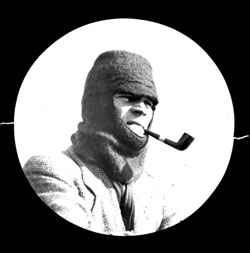
- Breckon in 1913
- Born: Arthur Ninnis Breckon; 24 February 1887; Hamilton, New Zealand
- Died: 1965 (aged 77–78)
- Occupation: Photographer

Arthur Ninnis Breckon (24 February 1887 – 1965) was a New Zealand-born photojournalist. Breckon was the first person from New Zealand to be published in Life Magazine, with his photo of a tuatara.

== Biography ==
Breckon started his career under the mentorship of H.E Gaze in 1904 and was eventually appointed the position of Chief Photographer for The Weekly News and The New Zealand Herald for over twenty years. Breckon's press photography captured the conflict and tension present in early 20th century New Zealand. Most notably, Breckon captured the police attack on Maungapōhatu in April 1916. This event resulted in Rua Kēnana and some of his followers made to stand trial for sedition. He was the only photographer present at the time.

Another important moment that Breckon captured in photographs was the expedition of Douglas Mawson to the sub Antarctic Macquarie Islands. The crew were running low on food supplies so a rescue mission was despatched. This mission, which Breckon was a part of, ran into trouble of its own when their landing boat capsised in the surf. Breckon and the team struggled to shore in the icy cold water to eventually make their way to Mawson's men. Breckon photos captured much of the wildlife on the islands.

Other honourable mentions in Breckon's work was his photographs of the wreckage site of the SS Wiltshire off Great Barrier in 1922 and pictures of the Napier earthquake.

Breckon had also photographed both the First and Second New Zealand Expeditionary Forces before their deployment to war.

David Eggleton describes, "Breckon's on the spot reportage was a demonstration of photography as a form of social control, serving to isolate, classify and document anomalous behaviour for everyone's edification."

== Personal life ==
Breckon's son Aubrey Arthur Ninnis Breckon was a photographer for the New Zealand Herald and the Auckland Weekly News, and during World War II travelled to England, becoming a pilot with the Royal Air Force.

== Gallery ==
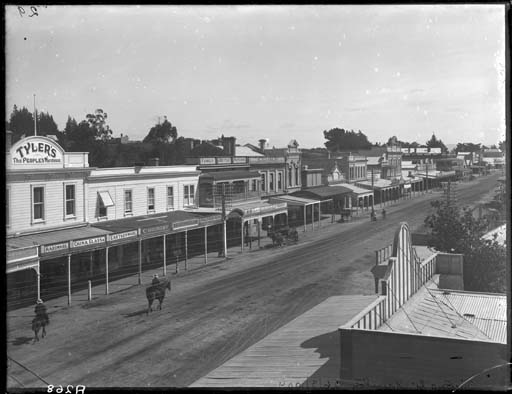
Victoria Street in Hamilton (1907)

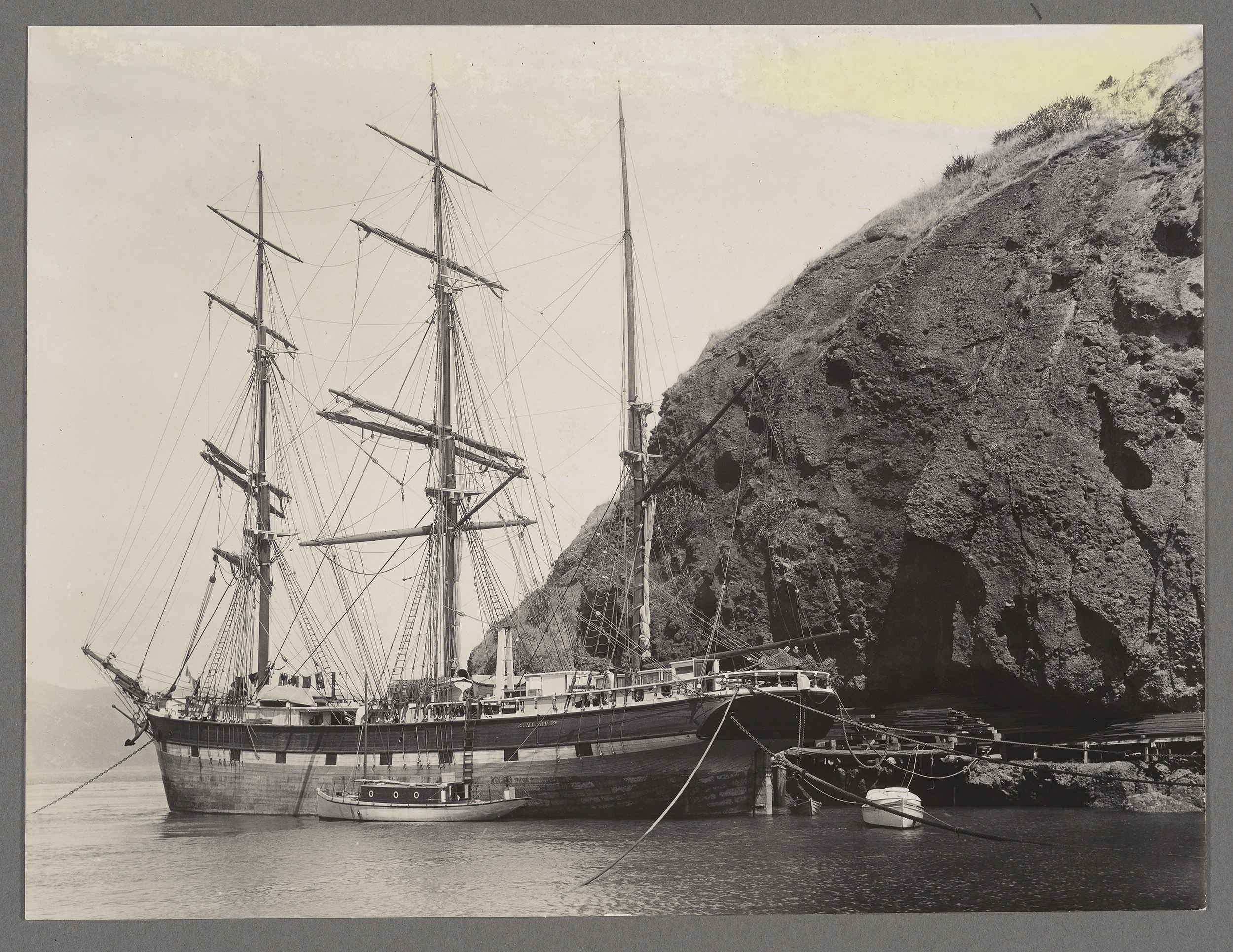
The barque Njord at Whatipu (1909)

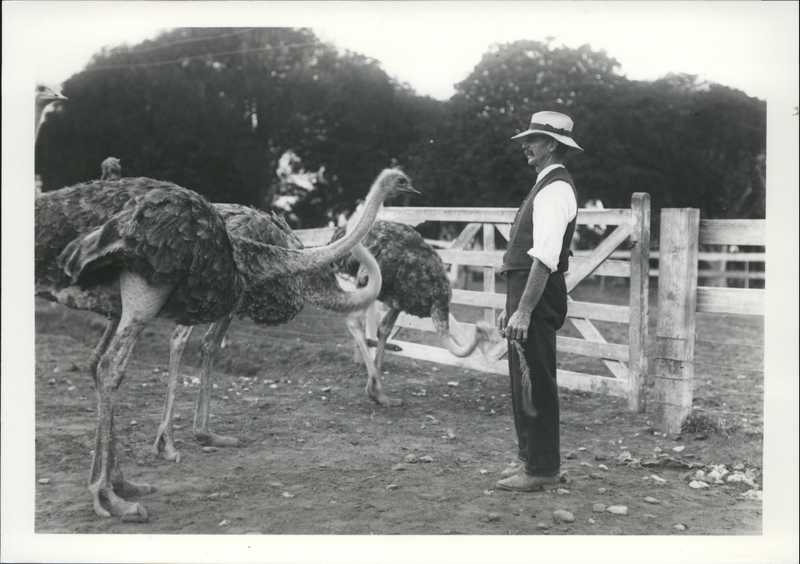
The Helvetia Ostrich Farm (1910)

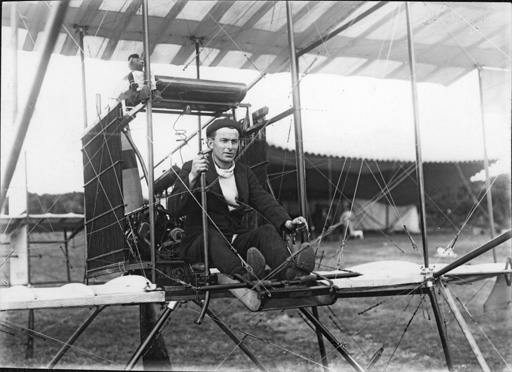
Vivian Walsh piloting the biplane Manurewa No. 1, which made the second successful flight in New Zealand (1911)

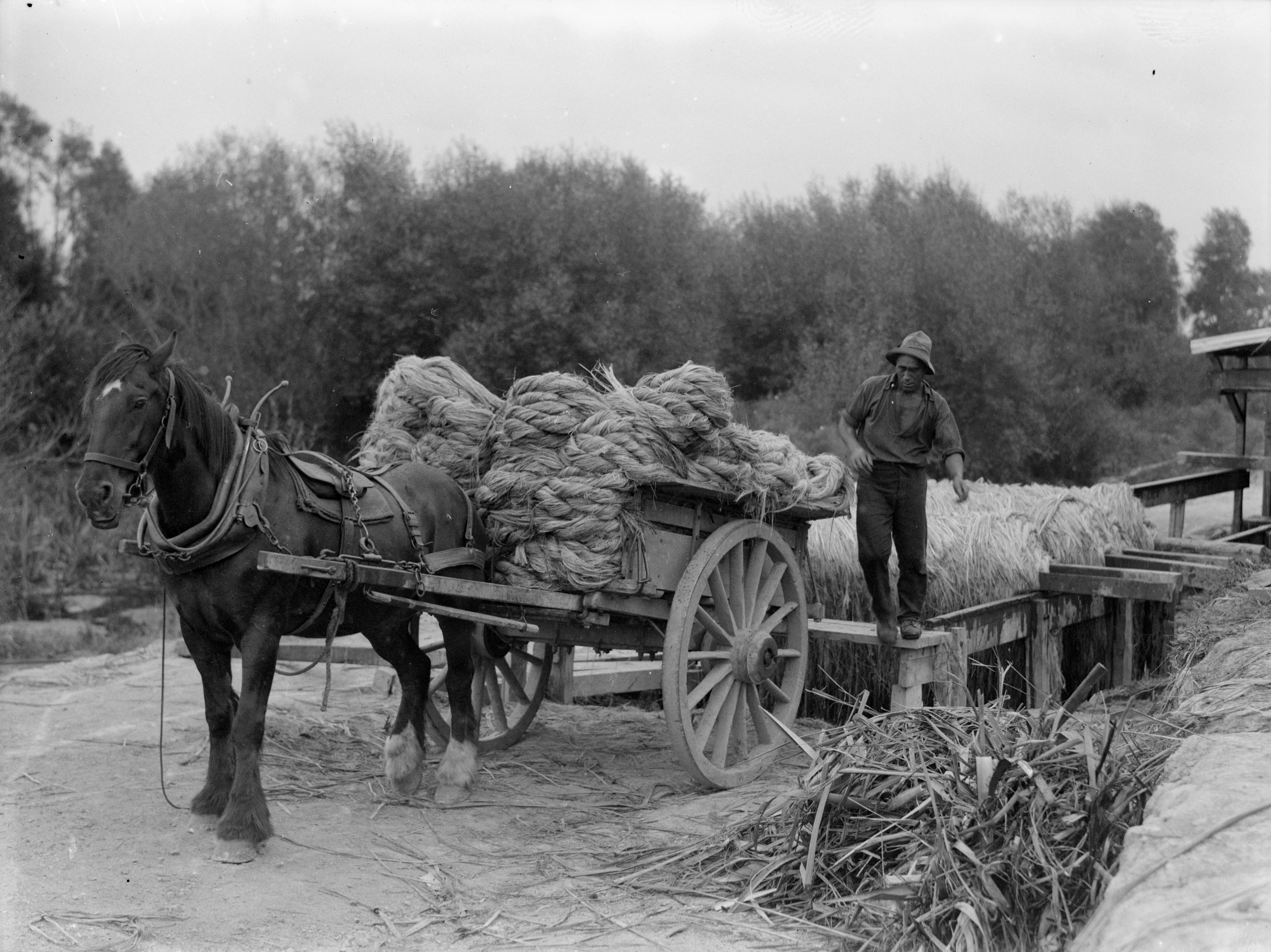
Flax milling at Pōkeno (1930)

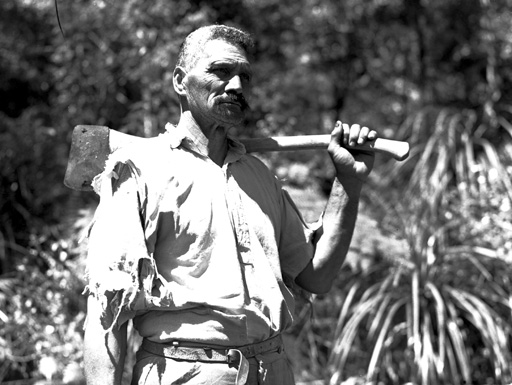
A kauri logger working on Great Barrier Island (1934)

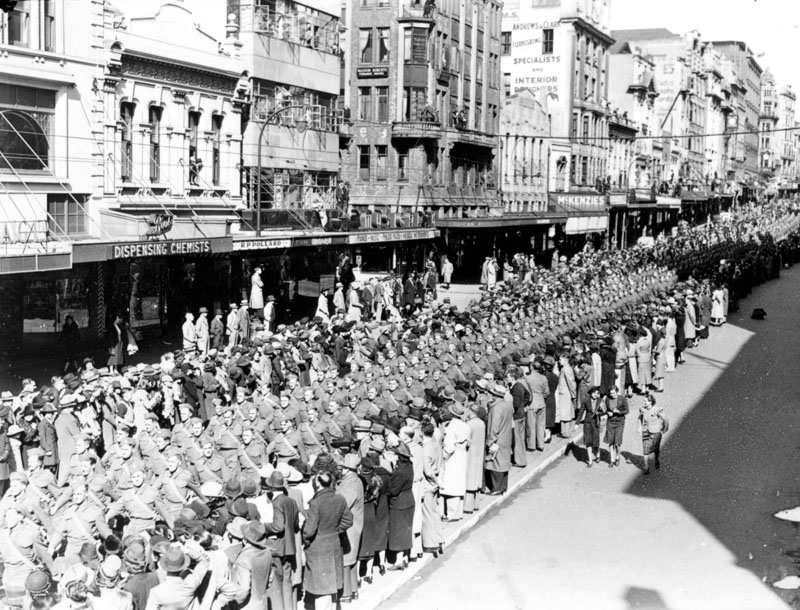
The third echelon of the New Zealand Expeditionary Force marching in Queen Street, Auckland (1940)

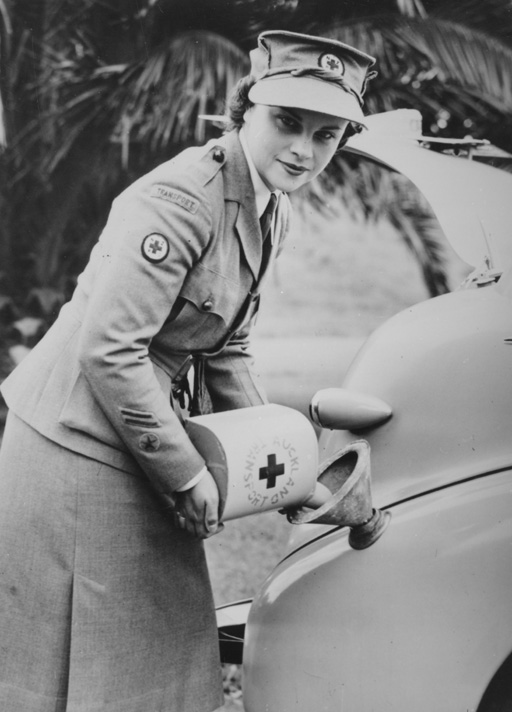
A Red Cross worker refueling a car (1943)
