= Wi Whitu =

Wi Whitu (1908–1983) was a notable New Zealand cook, blacksmith, midwife and exhumer. Of Maori descent, he identified with the Tuhoe iwi. He was born in Maungapohatu, Bay of Plenty, New Zealand in 1908.

== Family ==
His father Maka had become a devoted follower of Rua Kenana in 1907. His sister Pehirangi was one of Rua's wives and he and his brothers were given a crucial place in the accomplishment of Rua's teachings. Part of this doctrine was to release Tuhoe from the restrictions of custom and clear Tuhoe lands of all sacred places. This involved the wholesale exhumation of human remains and their return to Maungapohatu.
