= Correlative-based fallacies =

Informal fallacies based on correlative conjunctions

In philosophy, correlative-based fallacies are informal fallacies based on correlative conjunctions.

== Correlative conjunctions ==
A correlative conjunction is a relationship between two statements where one must be false and the other true. In formal logic this is known as the exclusive or relationship; traditionally, terms between which this relationship exists have been called contradictories.

=== Examples ===
In the following example, statement b explicitly negates statement a:

1. Fido is a dog.
2. Fido is not a dog.

Statements can also be mutually exclusive, without explicitly negating each other as in the following example:

1. Object one is larger than object two.
2. Object one is smaller or the same size as object two.

== Fallacies ==
Fallacies based on correlatives include:

False dilemma or false correlative.
Here something which is not a correlative is treated as a correlative, excluding some other possibility.
Denying the correlative
where an attempt is made to introduce another option into a true correlative.
Suppressed correlative
where the definitions of a correlative are changed so that one of the options includes the other, making one option impossible.

== See also ==
- Logical conjunction
- Logical disjunction
