= Denying the correlative =

Attempt made at introducing alternatives where there are none

The informal fallacy of denying the correlative is an attempt made at introducing alternatives where there are none. It is the opposite of the false dilemma, which is denying other alternatives. Its logical form is Either X or not X, therefore Y.

For example:

Judge: So did you kill your landlord or not?
Kirk: I fought with him.

In the context of a multiple choice question, the best answer must be chosen from the available alternatives. However, in determining whether this fallacy is committed, a close look at the context is required. The essence of denying the correlative is introducing an alternative into a context that logically admits none, but this itself could be taken as an indication that the context is irrational. Even if there are no implicit alternatives, (such as the right to remain silent), assumptions may need to be questioned and clarified or implications may require a disclaimer.

== See also ==
- Correlative based fallacies
- Existential import
- Law of non-contradiction
