= Matahi =

- Rural community
- Interactive map of Matahi
- Coordinates: 38.226°S 176.840°E
- Country: New Zealand
- Region: Bay of Plenty
- Territorial authority: Whakatāne District
- Ward: Te Urewera General Ward
- Community: Tāneatua Community
- Electorates: East Cape; Waiariki (Māori)

Government
  - Territorial authority: Whakatāne District Council
  - Regional council: Bay of Plenty Regional Council
  - Mayor of Whakatāne: Nándor Tánczos
  - East Cape MP: Dana Kirkpatrick
  - Waiariki MP: Rawiri Waititi

Area
  - Total: 376.60 km^{2} (145.41 sq mi)

Population (2023 Census)
  - Total: 141
  - Density: 0.374/km^{2} (0.970/sq mi)

Matahi is a rural valley in the Whakatāne District and Bay of Plenty Region of New Zealand's North Island.

== History and culture ==
=== 20th century ===
Rua Kenana Hepetipa, a Māori prophet, faith healer and land rights activist, established the settlement in 1910. He had established the settlement of Maungapohatu three years earlier.

For several years, Rua lived between Matahi, with his youngest wife Te Atawhai Tara or Piimia, and Maungapohatu, with his first wife Pinepine Te Rika. From 1912, Matahi went through a period of growth, while Maungapohatu went through decline. Rua spent an increasing amount of time in Matahi, and was there when he died in 1937.

During the 1918 flu pandemic, the area did not have the high mortality rate of other parts of eastern Bay of Plenty.

The Matahi Bridge was destroyed and the area was cut off by landslips during severe flooding in March 1964. One of Rua's grandsons had to be rescued by helicopter after being badly injured in the severe weather.

By 1986, some descendants and followers of Rua returned to Matahi with young families to live closer to their marae and a traditional way of life.

=== 21st century ===
In 2010, Bay of Plenty man Pomare Mason was killed by his younger brother Whairiri Tamataonui Terewa in the valley, during an argument about the ownership of a home.

The valley was cut off, and Matahi Valley Road was closed, due to flooding and slips in April 2014. The valley was also affected by flooding in March and April 2017.

In July 2016 a mother and four children went missing in Te Urewera protected area, and Lions Hut on Matahi Valley Road became the base for the search operation. Relatives searched the area on their own, against official advice, and found the group about 30 minutes' from the valley road.

=== Marae ===
The valley is the rohe (tribal area) of the Tuhoe people. It has several marae:

- Matahi Marae and Te Huinga ō te Kura house is affiliated with Ngāi Tamatuhirae and was established in 1925. In October 2020, the Government committed $508,757 from the Provincial Growth Fund to upgrade Tataiāhape Marae, Piripari Marae, Matahi Marae and Tanatana Marae, creating 9.8 jobs.
- Omuriwaka Marae and Te Tātua o Hape ki Tūārangi house is affiliated with Ngāi Tamatuhirae.
- Tuapo Marae and Te Ao Hou house is affiliated with Tamakaimoana.
- Whakarae Marae and Toi te Huatahi house is affiliated with Whakatāne Hapū and Ngāi Tama and was established in 1930.

== Demographics ==
Matahi valley, including other small settlements further up the Waimana/Tauranga River, covers 376.60 km^{2} (145.41 sq mi). It is part of the Waingarara-Waimana statistical area.

Historical population
| Year | Pop. | ±% p.a. |
|---|---|---|
| 2006 | 96 | — |
| 2013 | 96 | +0.00% |
| 2018 | 96 | +0.00% |
| 2023 | 141 | +7.99% |

Matahi valley had a population of 141 in the 2023 New Zealand census, an increase of 45 people (46.9%) since the 2018 census, and an increase of 45 people (46.9%) since the 2013 census. There were 75 males and 72 females in 33 dwellings. 2.1% of people identified as LGBTIQ+. The median age was 30.7 years (compared with 38.1 years nationally). There were 39 people (27.7%) aged under 15 years, 30 (21.3%) aged 15 to 29, 63 (44.7%) aged 30 to 64, and 12 (8.5%) aged 65 or older.

People could identify as more than one ethnicity. The results were 23.4% European (Pākehā), 95.7% Māori, and 4.3% other, which includes people giving their ethnicity as "New Zealander". English was spoken by 100.0%, and Māori by 44.7%. No language could be spoken by 2.1% (e.g. too young to talk). The percentage of people born overseas was 2.1, compared with 28.8% nationally.

Religious affiliations were 19.1% Christian, 23.4% Māori religious beliefs, 2.1% New Age, and 2.1% other religions. People who answered that they had no religion were 51.1%, and 8.5% of people did not answer the census question.

Of those at least 15 years old, 6 (5.9%) people had a bachelor's or higher degree, 69 (67.6%) had a post-high school certificate or diploma, and 27 (26.5%) people exclusively held high school qualifications. The median income was $28,300, compared with $41,500 nationally. 3 people (2.9%) earned over $100,000 compared to 12.1% nationally. The employment status of those at least 15 was 33 (32.4%) full-time, 9 (8.8%) part-time, and 12 (11.8%) unemployed.

== Education ==
Te Kura Mana Māori o Matahi is a co-educational state Māori language immersion primary school for Year 1 to 8 students, with a roll of 16 as of July 2026. It opened in 1921.
