= Suppressed correlative =

Informal fallacy

The fallacy of suppressed correlative is a type of argument that tries to redefine a correlative (one of two mutually exclusive options) so that one alternative encompasses the other, i.e. making one alternative impossible. This has also been known as the fallacy of lost contrast and the fallacy of the suppressed relative.

== Description ==
A conceptual example:

Person 1: "All things are either X or not X." (The correlatives: X–not X.)
Person 2: "I define X such that all things that you claim are not X are included in X." (The suppressed correlative: not X.)

Alternatively Person 2 can redefine X in way that instead concludes all things are not X.

A simple example based on one by Alexander Bain:

Person 1: "Things are either mysterious or not mysterious. Exactly when an earthquake will strike is still a mystery, but how blood circulates in the body is not."
Person 2: "Everything is mysterious. There are still things to be learned about how blood circulates."

Regardless of whether Person 2's statement about blood circulation is true or not, the redefinition of "mysterious" is so broad that it omits significant contrast in the level of scientific understanding between earthquakes and blood circulation. Bain argues that if we hold the origin of the universe as equally mysterious against simple equations such as 3×4=12, it seems unimaginable what kind of concepts would be described as non-mysterious. Through redefinition, the word "mysterious" has lost any useful meaning, he says.

The redefinition is not always so obvious. At first glance it might appear reasonable to define brakes as "a method to quickly stop a vehicle"; however, this permits all vehicles to be described as having brakes. A sled could be driven into a sturdy barrier to stop it, but to therefore say the sled has brakes seems absurd.

This type of fallacy is often used in conjunction with one of the fallacies of definition. It is an informal fallacy.

== Usage ==
The Scottish logician Alexander Bain discussed the fallacy of suppressed correlative, which he also called the fallacy of suppressed relative, in the 19th century. He provided many example relative pairs where the correlative terms find their meaning through contrast: rest-toil, knowledge-ignorance, silence-speech, and so on. Bain classified this type of error as a fallacy of relativity, which in turn was one of many fallacies of confusion.

J. Loewenberg rejected a certain definition of empirical method – one that seemed so broad as to encompass all possible methods – as committing the fallacy of suppressed correlative. This error has been said to be found in the philosophy of some empiricists, including Edgar S. Brightman, sometimes in broadening the meaning of other terms relevant to these arguments, such as "perception" (when taken to include entirely cognitive processes in addition to ones usually classified as perceptual).

Critics identify the fallacy in arguments for psychological egoism, which proposes that all actions conducted by individuals are motivated by their own self-interest. Outside of this idea it is believed that sometimes people do things selflessly, such as acts of charitable giving or self-sacrifice. Psychological egoism explains all scenarios entirely in terms of selfish motivations (e.g., that acting for one's own purposes is an act of self-interest); however, critics charge that in doing so they are redefining selfishness to the point where it encompasses all motivated actions and thus makes the term meaningless.

== See also ==
- Correlative-based fallacies
