= Zero suppression =

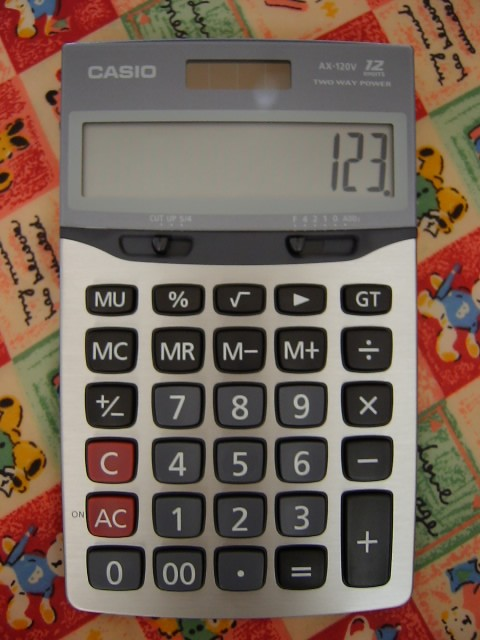
An electronic calculator with zero suppression, showing 123 instead of 000000000123

Zero suppression is the removal of redundant zeroes from a number. This can be done for storage, page or display space constraints or formatting reasons, such as making a letter more legible.

== Examples ==
- 00049823 → 49823
- 7.678600000 → 7.6786
- 0032.3231000 → 32.3231
- 2.45000×10^{10} → 2.45×10^{10}
- 0.0045×10^{10} → 4.5×10^{7}

One must be careful; in physics and related disciplines, trailing zeros are used to indicate the precision of the number, as an error of ±1 in the last place is assumed. Examples:

- 4.5981 is 4.5981 ± 0.0001
- 4.59810 is 4.5981 ± 0.00001
- 4.598100 is 4.5981 ± 0.000001

== Data compression ==
It is also a way to store a large array of numbers, where many of the entries are zero. By omitting the zeroes, and instead storing the indices along with the values of the non-zero items, less space may be used in total. It only makes sense if the extra space used for storing the indices (on average) is smaller than the space saved by not storing the zeroes. This is sometimes used in a sparse array.

Example:

- Original array: 0, 1, 0, 0, 2, 5, 0, 0, 0, 4, 0, 0, 0, 0, 0
- Pairs of index and data: {2,1}, {5,2}, {6,5}, {10,4}

== See also ==
- Run-length encoding – Form of lossless data compression
- Zero code suppression – Digital telecommunications technique
- Zero-suppressed decision diagram – Kind of binary decision diagram
