= Reflux suppressant =

A reflux suppressant is any one of a number of drugs used to combat oesophageal reflux. Commonly, following ingestion a 'raft' of alginic acid is created, floating on the stomach contents by carbon dioxide released by the drug. This forms a mechanical barrier to further reflux. Some preparations also contain antacids to protect the oesophagus. Alginate-based reflux suppressants relieve heartburn or regurgitation symptoms in about 60–70% of patients.

Reflux can also be coincidentally reduced by the motility stimulants and antidopaminergics.
