= Maungapōhatu =

- Village
- Etymology: rocky mountain
- Interactive map of Maungapōhatu
- Coordinates: 38°34′14″S 177°05′43″E
- Country: New Zealand
- Region: Bay of Plenty
- Territorial authority: Whakatāne District
- Ward: Te Urewera General Ward
- Community: Murupara Community
- Settled by Māori: 1907
- Electorates: East Cape; Waiariki (Māori)

Government
  - Territorial authority: Whakatāne District Council
  - Regional council: Bay of Plenty Regional Council
  - Mayor of Whakatāne: Nándor Tánczos
  - East Cape MP: Dana Kirkpatrick
  - Waiariki MP: Rawiri Waititi

Area
  - Total: 242.32 km^{2} (93.56 sq mi)

Population (2023 Census)
  - Total: 162
  - Density: 0.669/km^{2} (1.73/sq mi)
- Time zone: UTC+12
  - Summer (DST): UTC+13 (NZDT)

Maungapōhatu is a settlement in the Bay of Plenty Region of New Zealand's North Island. Located in a remote area of the Urewera bush country about 20 kilometres (12 mi) north of Lake Waikaremoana, it was founded by Rua Kēnana Hepetipa in 1907 and was substantially rebuilt twice during the next two decades. At its peak more than 500 people lived there, but it is very sparsely populated now. It lies at the foot of the 1366-metre mountain of the same name, which is sacred to the Tūhoe iwi.

== Location ==
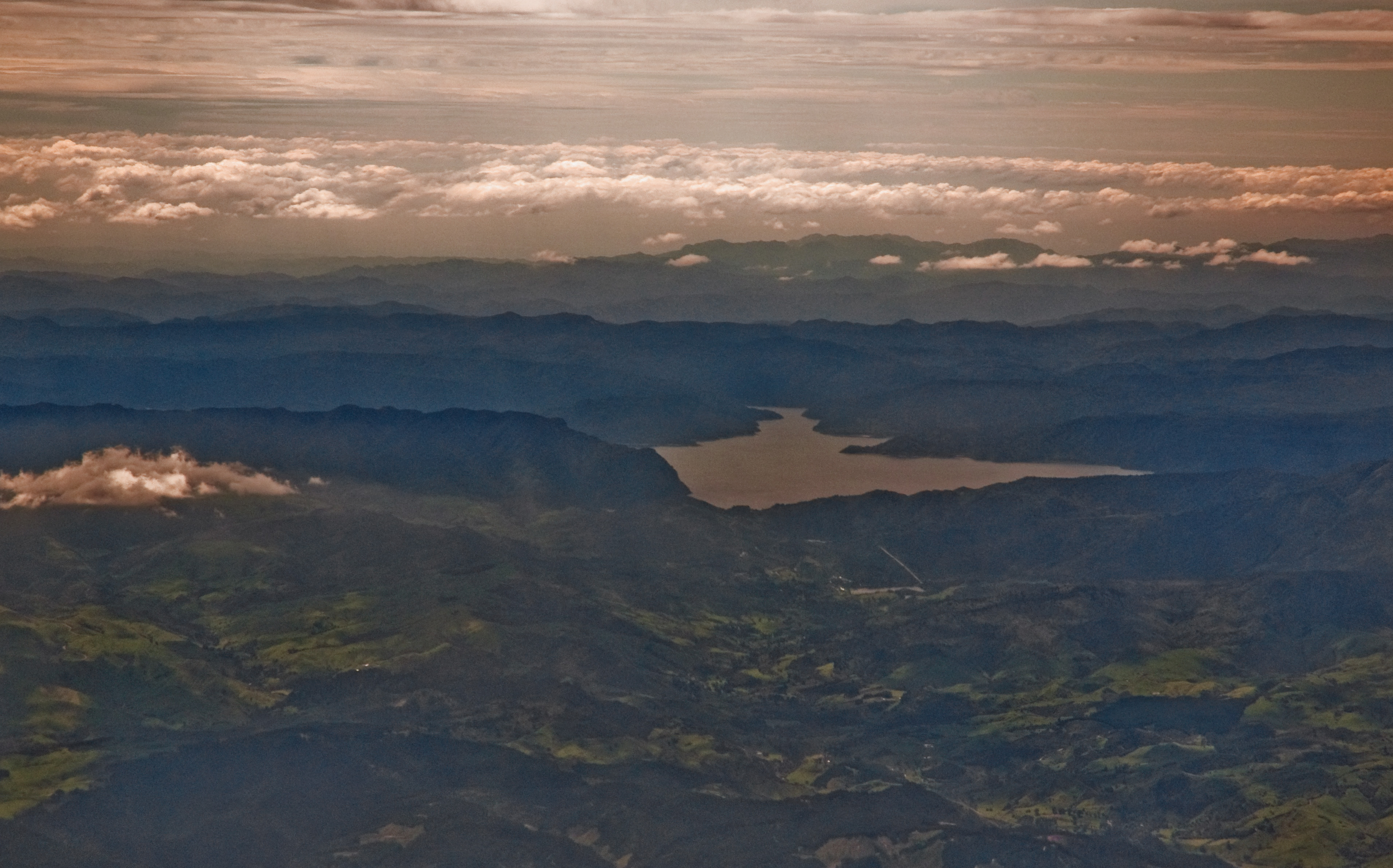
Lake Waikaremoana and Te Urewera from the south

Maungapōhatu is located in a remote area of the Urewera bush country about 20 kilometres (12 mi) north of Lake Waikaremoana. Te Urewera is a thickly forested hill country to the northeast of Lake Taupō. It is the historical home of the Tūhoe, an iwi known for their stance on Māori sovereignty. Today, much of the land is contained within Te Urewera National Park, which has an area of 2,126 square kilometres (821 sq mi) and which in 2013 had a population of only 2,133. The State Highway 38 is the only major arterial road that crosses it, running from Waiotapu near Rotorua via Murupara to Wairoa.

Because of its isolation and dense forest, Te Urewera remained largely untouched by British colonists until the early 20th century; in the 1880s it was still in effect under Māori control and few Pākehā were prepared to risk entering the area.

Following Premier Richard Seddon’s visit to Te Urewera in 1894 the Tūhoe chief Tūtakangahau requested a Union Flag from the government. This flew at the Maungapōhatu marae from at least 1897. The words "Kotahi Te Ture / Mo Nga Iwi E Rua / Maungapohatu" (One law / for both peoples / Maungapōhatu) were stitched onto it and it had been created as a sign of a peaceful relationship with the Crown. The words were chosen to affirm “the important principle that the dominant culture should not pass laws discriminating against Māori.”

== Rua Kēnana ==
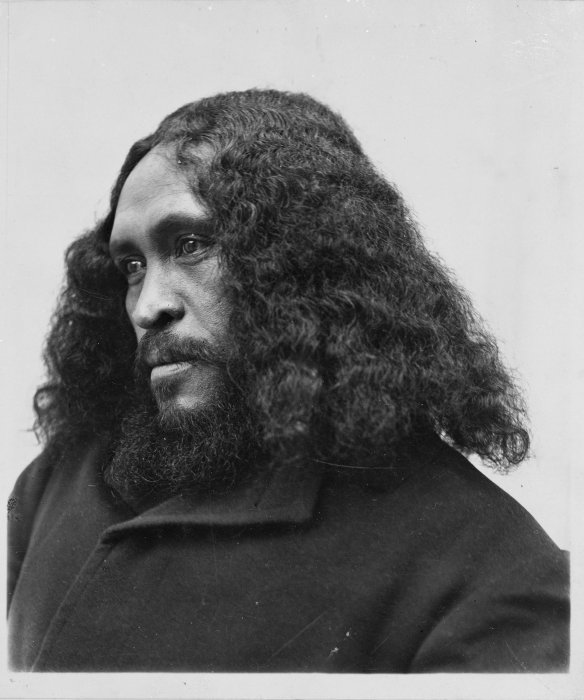
Rua Kēnana in 1908

Rua Kēnana Hepetipa, a grandson of Tūtakangahau, was a Māori prophet, faith healer and land rights activist. He claimed to have been born in 1869 at Maungapōhatu, although this is disputed. His father was killed fighting for Te Kooti, a guerrilla fighter and the founder of the Ringatū religion.

Brought up amongst the Tūhoe, Rua Kēnana left in 1887 and worked on sheep stations in the Gisborne and Bay of Plenty districts. After a mystical experience on the mountain of Maungapōhatu, Rua claimed to be the successor to Te Kooti and the Māori brother of Christ. On 12 April 1906 he prophesied that on 25 June he would "ascend the throne" and that King Edward VII would arrive at Gisborne. When the King failed to appear, Rua announced: "I am really that King. Here I am, with all my people." Rua then returned to Maungapōhatu where he set himself up as a prophet and announced his plan for the creation of the City of God at Maungapōhatu.

The construction of Maungapōhatu was to be a conscious recreation of the biblical city of Jerusalem. The population called themselves the Iharaira, the Israelites, and Rua took the name "Moses". The construction of the community was to mark the beginning of their trials and a test their faithfulness. Maungapōhatu was their "City of Redemption. Here, one day, the promises would all be completed and the confiscated lands and the autonomy of the people restored".

== Settlement history ==
=== Early years ===
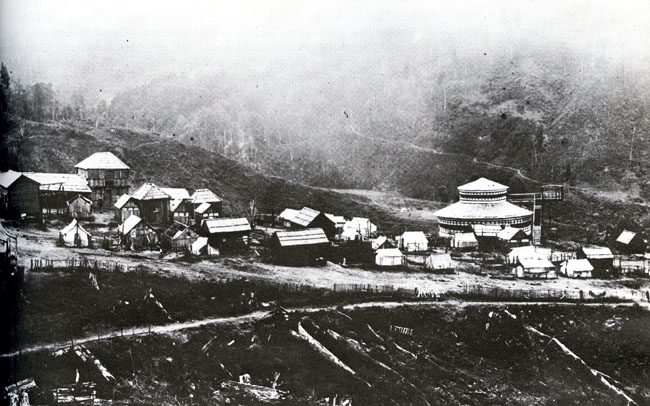
Maungapōhatu in 1908

Rua arrived at this isolated outpost as the winter of 1907 set in. During the first year the potato crop failed and there were no pigs to be had. At least fifty people died that winter, most of them children, from the inadequacy of the houses, an outbreak of typhoid which came from the valley camps, and a measles epidemic which devastated the community. Sometimes there was nothing to eat but huhu, and the coarse toi leaves, normally used only for clothing. Nonetheless, from this inauspicious beginning the community struggled on to a first summer of plenty. Two groups had come together to build te pa tapu o te atua, the sacred pā of the Lord; about half the entire Tūhoe tribe; and the Whakatōhea, who through confiscation were almost landless. To signify the union between these two Mataatua tribes, Rua constructed the "House of the Lord", Hiruharama Hou, built with two gables. One side was for the Tūhoe and the other for the Whakatōhea.

Built between 1907–1908, Maungapōhatu "was an impressive settlement with its own courthouse, bank, and council room. The streets were lit with oil lamps and it had its own water system, with separated pools for washing and cooking. The families set up their own rules of conduct, which were enforced through a council of elders and their prophet leader. In these first years, about 500 or 600 people lived at Maungapohatu." Rua attempted to create a new system of land ownership and land usage with a strong communal basis but which also emphasised the concept of family ownership of property.

The concepts of tapu and noa were central to the design, with different sections to reflect these two ideas. The sacred area, which included the civic amenities and sleeping houses was called the wahi tapu and fenced off from the surrounding noa area where buildings for the preparation of food and other mundane activities were built. The Bible was also a significant influence. The Hiruharama Hou was inspired by the instructions David had been given for Solomon's House as described in the Books of Chronicles and Kings.

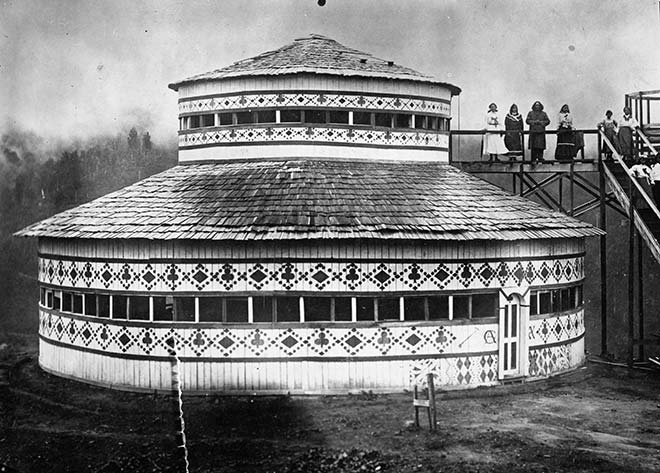
The Hīona

A two-storied structure called the Hīona (Zion) was constructed that became the parliament from where community affairs were administered. This circular meeting house was decorated with a design of blue clubs (Rua's personal symbol) and yellow diamonds, and stood within the inner sanctum of the pā. This was Rua's “Council Chamber and Court House” – also known as “Rua's Temple”. Rua thought it was modelled on the Jerusalem Temple (even though his chamber was not to be a place of worship), but the actual model was the present day Dome of the Rock on Jerusalem's Temple Mount, a Muslim holy site. The internal design with its two doors, winding staircase and "windows of narrow lights" was more solidly based on the biblical record. The unique cylindrical shape was a radical departure from traditional North Island Māori architecture.

However, the authorities saw Rua as a disruptive influence and targeted him with the Tohunga Suppression Act of 1907, which banned traditional Māori healers from using herbs and other healing methods which were part of their traditional medicine. By 1908 Rua's struggle for power had brought the Tūhoe to the brink of civil war and the Prime Minister Sir Joseph Ward intervened in an attempt to curb the prophet's influence.

=== Second phase ===
By the close of 1913, Maungapōhatu had declined. The Whakatōhea had left and it had become a community of about 30 families. In 1914 the community broke up of its own accord and 20,000 acres which the Tūhoe had set aside in 1907, to be “a habitation for God and man”, were partitioned. Rua left and the Hīona was abandoned and became used as a hay store. In 1914 a new meeting house in a more traditional style was built -Tane Nui A Rangi – ‘Great Tāne of the Heavens’. Even so, controversy was seldom far away. Rua was fined for sly grogging in 1910 and in 1915 served a short gaol sentence for a similar offence. On his return from prison he attempted to reconstruct Maungapōhatu. The pā, abandoned in about 1913, was rebuilt with the help of hundred men who worked for three hours each day for three days, "a ritual resurrection of a new and more perfect community". This came in tandem with a relaxation of various tapu observances including the dismantling of the fence between the tapu and noa areas.

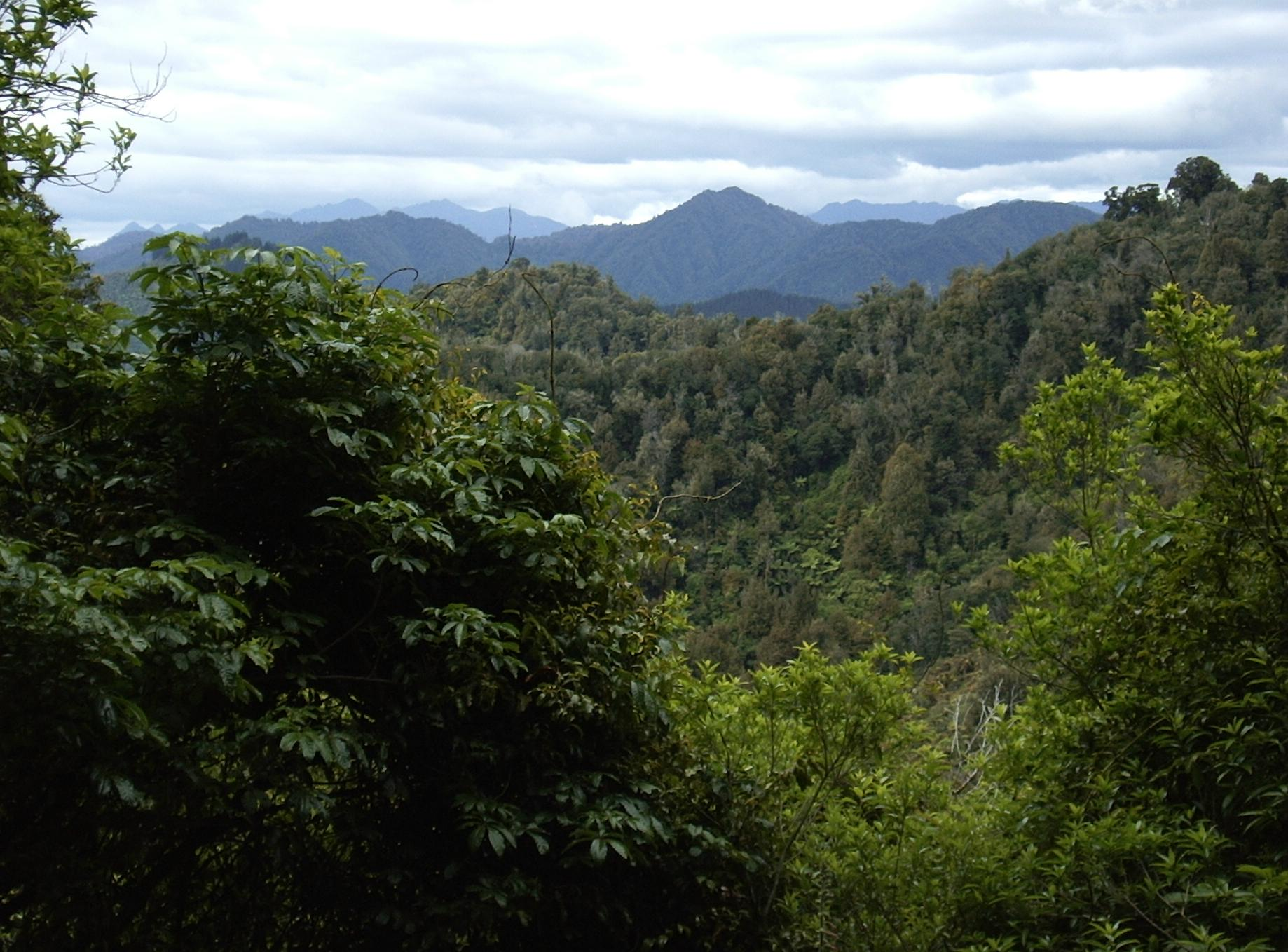
The bush country of Te Urewera

Rua attempted to persuade the Tūhoe to boycott military service during the First World War. This was taken by the establishment as sedition and finally gave the Government and Rua's detractors the incentive to intervene against him and the Maungapōhatu community. On 2 April 1916, seventy heavily armed police officers arrived to arrest Rua. Because the village was so remote, the police came well-equipped, using wagons and pack-horses, and camped on the way.

There are conflicting versions of what took place when the police arrived. There was no violent resistance from Rua personally but he refused to submit to arrest, and his supporters fought a brisk half-hour gun battle with the police. In this exchange, Rua's son Toko and a Māori bodyguard were killed and two Māori and four constables were wounded. When the hostilities ceased, Rua was arrested and transported to Rotorua. He was eventually found not guilty of sedition but guilty of “moral resistance” to the police and sentenced to 12 months hard labour to be followed by 18 months imprisonment. He served 9 months in Mt Eden Prison, Auckland.

=== Third and final phase ===
The costs of defence at the various trials had ruined the community financially as it had to sell stock and land to meet the debt. The community was even ordered to pay the costs of the entire police operations and raid at Maungapōhatu. Although the supreme court had found Rua's arrest illegal and a legal petition had been drafted to Parliament on 1 May 1917 on behalf of the Maungapōhatu people calling for a full public inquiry into the events of April 1916, the behaviour of the police there and the subsequent intimidation of witnesses, no compensation was ever offered.

When Rua returned to the Urewera, the settlement was divided, the lands overgrown and much of the community had relocated. The Presbyterian Mission under Rev. John Laughton had moved into Maungapōhatu and was teaching Presbyterian Christianity and pākehā value systems. Rua had banned pākehā schools from the original community but a circular schoolhouse, described as being “in the most isolated spot where any school is maintained in New Zealand” was still in active use in the early 1920s. Possibly as part of a ritual purification Rua had both the Hiruharama Hou and the Hīona destroyed. A typhoid epidemic broke out in the community in early in 1925 and after Laughton left in 1926 Rua organised the construction of a whole village for the third and final time. The new design reflected Rua's transition from a style of Old Testament prophet to that of New Testament pacifist. Houses of slab and shingle with galvanised iron roofs were built. There were two main streets and the houses were grouped carefully along them. He claimed this rebuilding was to prepare for the end of the world but when this failed to happen he blamed his followers. Eventually he moved downstream to Matahī in the eastern Bay of Plenty, where he lived until his death in 1937."

Nonetheless, the community continued to thrive for a while, facilities including two tennis courts and an open-air dance floor. Between 1927 and 1929 Maungapōhatu had a population of about 150 and this period was remembered fondly by those who lived there. However, by 1936 the population had declined to 21 families. Binney (1983) notes that the main reasons for the long term decline of the settlement included the difficulties of finding paid work while living at such a remote location, the nature of the terrain, which is "fiercely daunting for farming", and the community's inability to find any sources of capital for redevelopment. "The poor had subsidised the state, but the state had remained substantially indifferent to them."

During the 1930s two botanists, the "Tramping Girls of Auckland", Lucy Cranwell and Lucy Moore conducted a field trip to research the flora of Mt. Maungapōhatu. Cranwell wrote "we set off at 3 am in a PDW truck back to the Papatotara Saddle and from there trudged the deep-worn horse track across three steep ridges to Rua's Pa at the base of our mountain ... an almost vertical surveyer's route took us to the flattish summit just as the sun was setting. When dawn came the mountain plants were covered with a delicate layer of frost."

=== Modern day ===
Ngāi Tūhoe had donated 16,000ha of land to the government in 1922 so that roads could be built to connect Maungapōhatu with the eastern Bay of Plenty and Ruatāhuna but they were not constructed. In 1964 a road was finally built to the tiny settlement by a timber company and more than 1500 people attended the opening celebrations. For a few years the milling operations brought "modest prosperity to this isolated and impoverished area, which had never recovered from the exodus of most of its inhabitants" after the close of Rua's experiments in collective living. Little now remains of Maungapōhatu, the population of which was estimated at only 15 in the 1960s.

In 2006 the annual synod of the Diocese of Waiapu passed a motion apologising for the Anglican Church's role in the 1907 Tohunga Suppression Act and in May of that year Archbishop Brown Turei and other church members made a pilgrimage to Maungapōhatu. The church also announced plans to contribute to the rebuilding of the Maungapōhatu marae. In 2014 the Maungapōhatu flag, which had been removed by the police in 1916 at the time of Rua Kēnana's arrest, was returned by Auckland Museum to the Tūhoe as part of "the Museums’ commitment to addressing historic ownership issues associated with taonga."

== Demographics ==
Maungapōhatu covers 242.32 km^{2} (93.56 sq mi). It is part of the Galatea statistical area.

Historical population
Year	Pop.	±% p.a.
2013	114	—
2018	138	+3.90%
2023	162	+3.26%

Maungapōhatu had a population of 162 in the 2023 New Zealand census, an increase of 24 people (17.4%) since the 2018 census, and an increase of 48 people (42.1%) since the 2013 census. There were 84 males and 81 females in 42 dwellings. The median age was 27.2 years (compared with 38.1 years nationally). There were 45 people (27.8%) aged under 15 years, 45 (27.8%) aged 15 to 29, 54 (33.3%) aged 30 to 64, and 21 (13.0%) aged 65 or older.

People could identify as more than one ethnicity. The results were 18.5% European (Pākehā), 98.1% Māori, and 3.7% Pasifika. English was spoken by 87.0%, and Māori by 64.8%. No language could be spoken by 3.7% (e.g. too young to talk). New Zealand Sign Language was known by 1.9%. The percentage of people born overseas was 0.0, compared with 28.8% nationally.

Religious affiliations were 29.6% Christian, and 46.3% Māori religious beliefs. People who answered that they had no religion were 18.5%, and 9.3% of people did not answer the census question.

Of those at least 15 years old, 12 (10.3%) people had a bachelor's or higher degree, 57 (48.7%) had a post-high school certificate or diploma, and 54 (46.2%) people exclusively held high school qualifications. The median income was $24,000, compared with $41,500 nationally. The employment status of those at least 15 was 30 (25.6%) full-time, 18 (15.4%) part-time, and 15 (12.8%) unemployed.

== Marae ==
Maungapōhatu Marae, also known as Te Māpou Marae, is the traditional meeting grounds of the Tūhoe hapū of Tamakaimoana; it includes the Tāne-nui-ā-rangi meeting house. In October 2020, the Government committed $490,518 from the Provincial Growth Fund to upgrade the marae, creating 21 jobs.

== People from Maungapōhatu ==
- Rua Kēnana Hepetipa (1869–1937) – see above.
- Te Pairi Tūterangi (d. 1954) a Tūhoe leader and artist.
- Te Whenuanui (d. 1907) a Tūhoe chief.
- Wi Whitu (1908–1983) a blacksmith and exhumer, his sister was one of Rua's wives.
