= Tohunga Suppression Act 1907 =

Act of the New Zealand Parliament

New Zealand Parliament
- Long title: An Act to suppress Tohungas
- Royal assent: 24 September 1907
- Commenced: Immediate

Legislative history
- Introduced by: James Carroll
- Passed: 1907

Amended by
- None

Related legislation
- Maori Councils Act 1900, Quackery Prevention Act 1908
- Status: Repealed

The Tohunga Suppression Act 1907 was an Act of the New Zealand Parliament aimed at replacing tohunga as traditional Māori healers with western medicine.

It was introduced by James Carroll who expressed impatience with what he considered regressive Māori attitudes, as he was worried those attitudes would isolate Māori. Officials had been concerned for years about the sometimes dangerous practices of tohunga. The Act was introduced in part to target Māori self-proclaimed prophet, faith healer and land rights activist Rua Kenana, but it was never used against him.

It was praised by many influential Māori at the time, including Māui Pōmare and all four Māori MPs (Āpirana Ngata, Hōne Heke Ngāpua, Tame Parata and Henare Kaihau). According to Willie Jackson, the prevailing concern raised by Ngata was the harm arising from improper medical practices, rather than the destruction of mātauranga Māori.

== The Act ==
The Act contained only four clauses, the first of which simply gave the short title. The second clause stated that "Every person who gathers Maoris around him by practising on their superstition or credulity, or who misleads or attempts to mislead any Maori by professing or pretending to possess supernatural powers in the treatment or cure of any disease, or in the foretelling of future events, or otherwise" was liable for prosecution.

The first offence could be subject to a fine of up to 25 pounds or up to six months imprisonment. Subsequent offences could lead to a prison term of up to a year. However, no prosecution under the Act could be commenced without the consent of the Minister of Native Affairs.

The third section enabled the Governor of New Zealand to gazette regulations to enable the intention of the Act to be carried out. The fourth section repealed subsection 5 of section 16 of the Maori Councils Act 1900, which had allowed Maori Councils to license tohunga.

== Background ==
Parliament debated the Act. Members portrayed traditional practices in curing smallpox (and other introduced diseases) as ineffectual and sometimes dangerous. This led to characterisations of some tohunga as "charlatans" exploiting their fellow Māori.

Speakers in favour of the Act referred to "Second-class Tohunga", who did not possess traditional knowledge or authority and just preyed on the superstition of local people. Āpirana Ngata supported the Bill, though he said that current tohunga were a bastardized version of the traditional healer. He pointed out that tohunga provided the only medical care available in many districts, and said that the Government would never be able to suppress tohunga unless they could provide a substitute. Hōne Heke Ngāpua, member of Parliament and great-nephew of the famous Hōne Heke, thought that the Bill went in the right direction, but did not go far enough as there was no provision for prosecution of Pākehā tohunga or 'quacks' (this omission was addressed by the Quackery Prevention Act, 1908).

At least three Europeans were prosecuted under the Tohunga Suppression Act.

== Effects ==
Tohunga were the holders of knowledge of most rites, and knowledge in general. This included health matters, or rongoā, as tohunga were experts in the use of medicinal plants and herbs. European settlers noted the good health and fitness of Māori when they arrived but the diseases that arrived with them were impervious to traditional healing practices. The perceived loss of power of the tohunga, along with missionary preachings, led many Māori to accept the new religion of the Pākehā in what was to become yet another destabilising factor to the traditional Māori lifestyle. Many tohunga declined to pass on their oral traditions leaving Māori bereft of much of their traditional base. Whatever the overt intentions, there was a paradigm of the time amongst colonial administrators and the general non-Māori populace that Māori were a "lost race", the effect of banning the practices of spiritual and cultural leaders was that it hastened assimilation.

The passing of the act meant knowledge about karakia was 'lost or hidden'. The Māori tribe or nation Tainui was an exception and retained karakia.

The Act was repealed by the Maori Welfare Act, 1962.

== Bibliography ==
- McLauchlan, Gordon (1992). The Illustrated encyclopedia of New Zealand. David Bateman Ltd, Glenfield, NZ. ISBN 1-86953-007-1.
- Riley, Murdoch (1994). Māori Healing and Herbal. Viking Sevenseas N.Z. Ltd, Paraparaumu, New Zealand. ISBN 0-85467-095-5.
- Voyce, Malcolm (1989). "Maori Healers in New Zealand: The Tohunga Suppression Act 1907". Oceania. 60 (2): 99–123. JSTOR 40331147.
