= Rua Kēnana Hepetipa =

Māori prophet and activist (1869–1937)

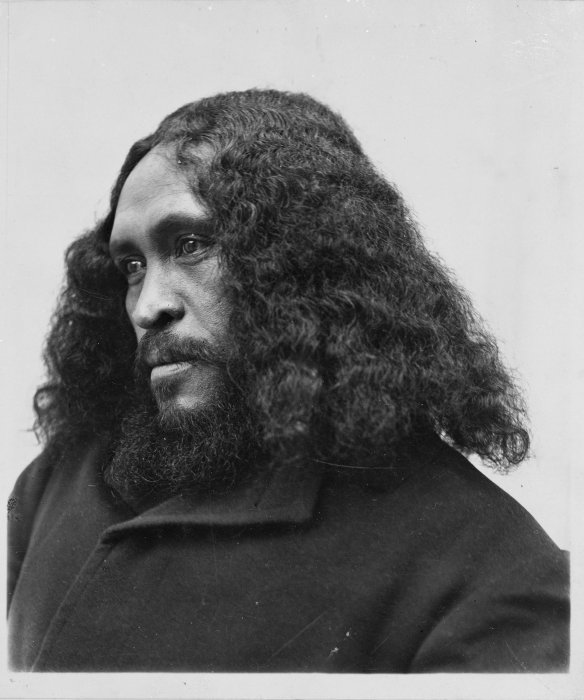
- Rua in 1908
- Born: 1869; Maungapōhatu, Urewera Ranges, New Zealand
- Died: 20 February 1937 (aged 67–68); Matahī, Bay of Plenty, New Zealand
- Other names: Te Mīhaia Hou; The New Messiah; Mīhaia
- Parents: Kēnana Tūmoana (father); Ngāhiwi Te Rihi (mother)

Rua Kēnana Hepetipa (1869 – 20 February 1937) was a Tūhoe prophet, faith healer and land rights activist. He called himself Te Mīhaia Hou, the New Messiah, and claimed to be Te Kooti Arikirangi's successor Hepetipa (Hephzibah) who would reclaim Tūhoe land that had been lost to Pākehā ownership. Rua's beliefs split the Ringatū Church, which Te Kooti had founded in around 1866/1868. In 1907 Rua formed a non-violent religious community at Maungapōhatu, the sacred mountain of Ngāi Tūhoe, in the Urewera. By 1900, Maungapōhatu was one of the few areas that had not been investigated by the Native Land Court. The community, also known as New Jerusalem, included a farming co-operative and a savings bank. Many Pākehā believed the community was subversive and saw Rua as a disruptive influence.

In 1916 police mounted an armed expedition, arriving at Maungapōhatu on 2 April to arrest Rua for sedition. He was found not guilty on this charge but imprisoned for resisting arrest. Rua was released in April 1918 and returned to Maungapōhatu, the community was however in decline and by the early 1930s, most people had left to find work elsewhere. Rua moved on to Matahī in the eastern Bay of Plenty and lived there until his death in 1937.

In September 2017, the government committed to pardon him as part of a Treaty of Waitangi settlement.

== Early life ==
Rua was born in 1869 at Maungapōhatu in the Urewera Country, New Zealand. He was the posthumous son of Kēnana Tūmoana, who was killed at Makaretū in November 1868 while fighting for Te Kooti, and of Ngāhiwi Te Rihi. Rua was a member of the Tamakaimoana hapū of the Tūhoe tribe and, although not a chief in his own right, was of high birth and could trace his descent from Pōtiki and Toroa of the Mātaatua canoe.

In 1887 Rua left Maungapōhatu to learn farming. He worked on sheep stations in the Gisborne and Bay of Plenty districts and was a member of a shearing gang on the East Coast. During this period he studied the Bible. In 1905 he returned to Maungapōhatu where he set himself up as a prophet of the New Testament type. Here he formed his new self-sufficient community at Maungapōhatu which he called the "New Jerusalem" with its eventual population of between 800 and 1000 followers.

== The prophet at Maungapōhatu ==
Rua standing on the rock in the centre

Te Kooti Arikirangi, the founder of the Ringatu religion, had predicted before he died that he would have successor. Rua's statement that he was the successor to Te Kooti was first announced through an experience that he underwent on Maungapōhatu, the sacred mountain of Tūhoe. The oral narratives tell how Rua and his first wife, Pinepine Te Rika, were directed to climb the mountain by a supernatural apparition, later revealed to be the archangel Gabriel. There they were shown a hidden diamond, the guardian-stone of the land, whose bright light was shielded by Te Kooti's shawl. Rua, in his turn, covered it again to protect it. In some versions of the narrative Rua met both Whaitiri, the ancestress of Tūhoe, and Christ on the mountain. Rua would soon claim to be the Māori brother of Christ.

The first of three periods of settlement at Maungapōhatu, Rua arrived at this isolated outpost as the winter set in. Those who were there can still remember the harshness of that first year: the potato crop failed and there were no pigs to be had. Tatu, one of the Riwaiti, had to go back to Te Whaiti to collect six sows to start their own breeding colony. At least 50 people died that winter, most of them children, from the inadequacy of the houses, an outbreak of typhoid which came from the valley camps, and a measles epidemic which devastated the community. Sometimes there was nothing to eat but huhu, and the coarse toi leaves, normally used only for clothing. But from this inauspicious beginning, the community struggled on to a first summer of great plenty. Two groups had come together to build "te pā tapu o te atua", the sacred pā of the Lord, the Tūhoe, about half the entire tribe, and the Whakatōhea, who through confiscation were almost landless. To signify the union between these two Mātaatua tribes, Rua constructed the house of the Lord, Hiruharama Hou, built with two gables. One side was for Tūhoe and the other for Whakatōhea.

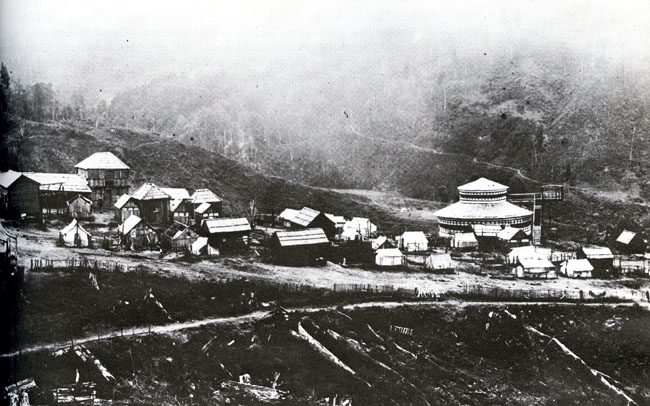
Maungapōhatu, city of the mist

Rua claimed to be the new Christ, the son of Jehovah, and said that no one who joined him would die. He called himself Te Mīhaia Hou, the New Messiah. Rua owed his power to the great skill with which he applied the scriptures to the day to day events in the lives of those who believed in him. His prophetic sayings (nga kupu whakari) gave meaning to a harsh existence, and offered hope to the future. He attempted to create a new system of land ownership and land usage. He organised a strong communal basis in all the settlements he founded but also emphasised the concept of family ownership of property. He cast aside all traditional Māori tapu practices and replaced them with new forms specifically associated with the faith in himself as the Promised Messiah. His followers vested their lands in Rua and he had these surveyed and sold back to them. The settlement was administered by the prophet's own parliament. He also formed a Māori mining company to exploit the mineral resources of the Urewera. At the prophet's command, 5 miles of forest were cleared and a prosperous farming community grew up under his leadership. Rua acted as his people's banker and took tithes of all they earned. In return, he gave them a prosperity they had never before known.

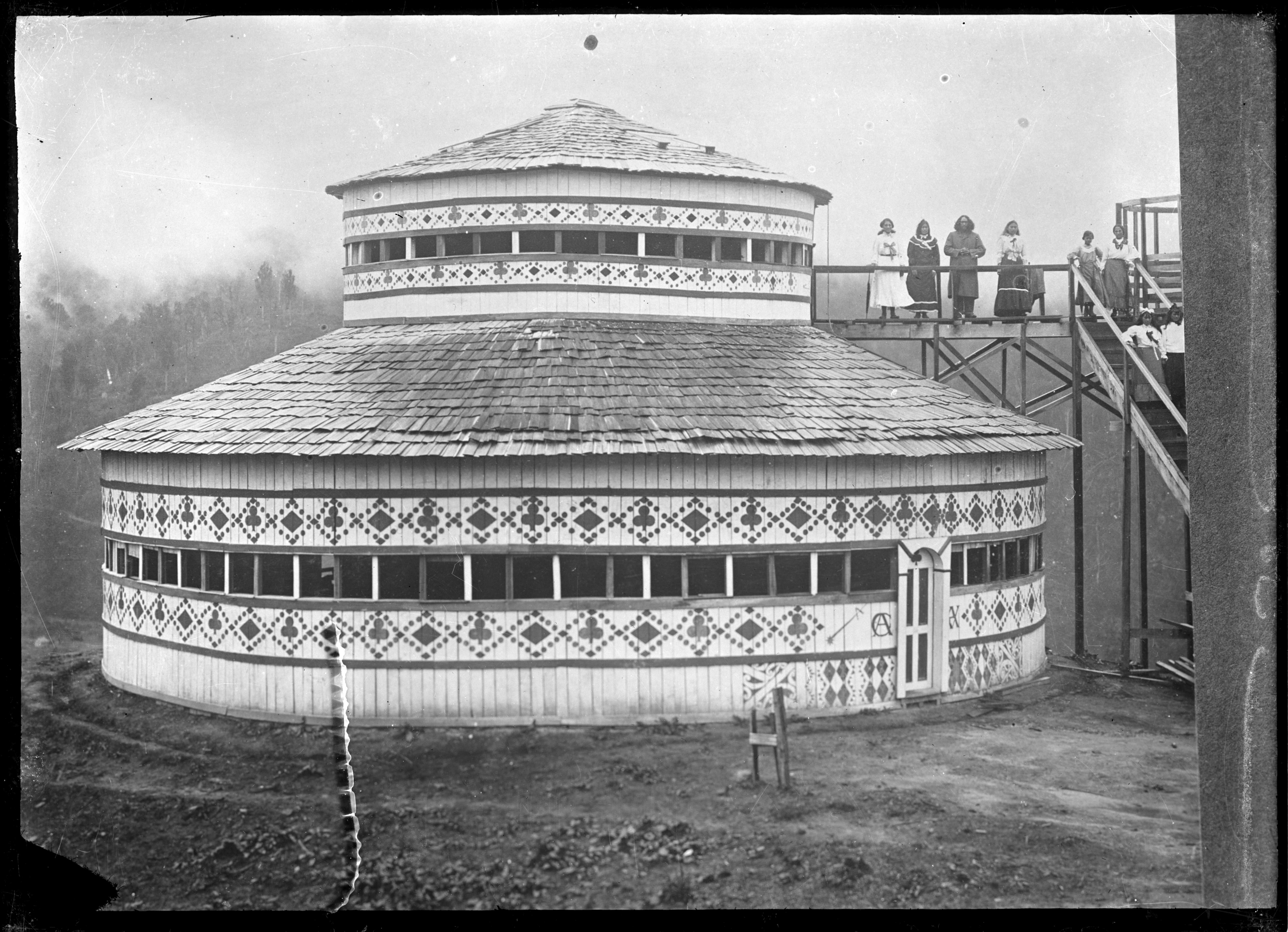
Hīona, the circular meeting house built in Maungapōhatu

Rua built a curious two-storied circular temple of worship at Maungapōhatu, called the Hīona (Zion) that also became his parliament from where the community affairs were administered. This circular meeting house, built in 1908, was decorated with a design of blue clubs and yellow diamonds, and stood within the inner sanctum of the pa. This was Rua's "Council Chamber and Court House" – also known as "Rua's Temple". Rua thought it was modelled on the Jerusalem Temple (even though his chamber was not to be a place of worship), but the actual model was the present day Dome of the Rock on Jerusalem's Temple Mount, a Muslim holy site and one of the most sacred of Islamic shrines. Its unique cylinder shape would make it one of a kind. He grew his hair long and affected a bushy beard in the patriarchal tradition fashioned on the Jewish Nazirite. As his reading of the Bible appeared to prescribe seven wives, Rua kept to this number and immediately replaced any who died or ran away. In all he had 12 wives and over 70 children.

From the King-ite tradition he inherited the idea that Māori possessed a separate nationality, and this, together with the success of his community, aroused the jealousy of local chiefs and incurred the Government's enmity. Through his personal vision his messianic religion promised the return of Māori lands and mana to Māori, and the end of their subjection to pākehā rule. He wanted to remove the Tūhoe people totally from European influence and induced many to sell all their stock and farming interests.

== Power ==
By 1908 Rua's struggle for power had brought the Tūhoe to the brink of civil war and the Prime Minister Sir Joseph Ward intervened to curb the prophet's influence. The Government had organised a meeting in March 1908 at Ruatoki of all the Tūhoe tribes in an attempt to sort out the political differences between the two main Tūhoe factions, that of Rua Kēnana and Numia Kererū, chief of the Ngāti Rongo and the main opponent among the Tūhoe of Rua's Christian-Judaic religious movement.

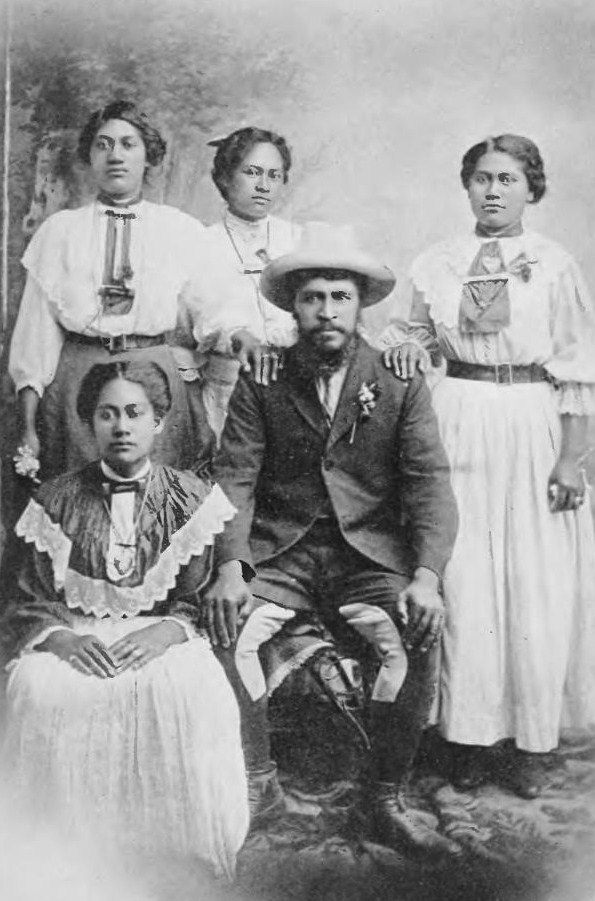
Rua and four of his wives

Because conflict was expected, the New Zealand Prime Minister had decided to informally visit both parties before the conference. At a dramatic encounter with Sir Joseph Ward on the Whakatāne beach front on 23 March 1908, Rua and Joseph Ward exchanged words. Rua, flanked by some of his wives and supporters while seated on a chair that had been borrowed from the pub, acknowledged Joseph Ward approaching. Ward addressed both parties publicly, asking for their assistance in reconciling the differences in the forthcoming meeting at Ruatoki. To Rua's followers Ward said that he could not accept all that Rua had asked for. In particular, his request for his supporters to be placed on the European electoral role (presumably because they were outnumbered in the Eastern Maori electorate) was unacceptable, for Māori have "special representation of their own". To Rua's request to have a special Māori government, he said, "I told Rua... that in New Zealand King Edward is king, and is represented here by his government or king. There can’t be two suns shining in the sky at the same time". Rua replied to Ward, "Yes, there is only one sun in the heavens, but it shines on one side – the Pākehā side – and it darkens on the other".

Rua had become a political embarrassment, and there arose the need by the Government to make an example of this man widely seen as an agitator, hoping a crackdown would discourage other Māori activists. The mainstream Anglican church encouraged the Government to suppress Rua Kenana. In 1907, the church passed a motion that supported "the recent action of the Government in the direction of the suppression of tohungism (traditional Māori healing), and trusts that it may be possible for the Church to make more aggressive action among the tribes which are specifically affected by this evil." Authorities saw Rua Kēnana as a disruptive influence and targeted him with the Tohunga Suppression Act 1907, which banned traditional Māori healers from using herbs and other healing methods which were part of their traditional medicine. The Tohunga Suppression Act was designed to neutralise powerful traditional Māori leaders and tailor-made as a political weapon specifically against Rua Kēnana and his movement of dissenting Māori.

As a result of a number of charges of obtaining alcohol in 1910, Rua was fined for sly grogging and, in 1915, served a short gaol sentence for a similar offence. On his release he resumed his sly grogging.

Rua insisted that his people boycott military service, arguing it was immoral to fight for a Pākehā King and Country given the injustice meted out on Māori under the British crown. Rua said, "I have 1400 men here and I am not going to let any of them enlist or go to war. You have no king now. The King of England he is no good. He is beat. The Germans will win. Any money I have I will give to the Germans. The English are no good. They have two laws. One for the Māori and one for the Pākehā. When the Germans win I am going to be king here. I will be king of the Māori and of the Pākehā." This was taken by the establishment as sedition and finally gave the Government and Rua's detractors the incentive to intervene against Kēnana and the Maungapōhatu community.

== Arrest ==
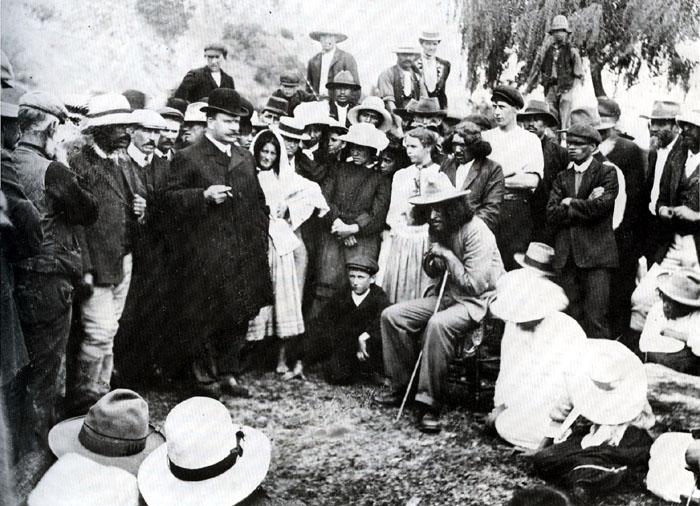
Rua Kēnana meets with New Zealand Prime Minister Joseph Ward on Whakatāne Beach, 23 March 1908.

During the First World War the New Zealand Government had concerns that Rua opposed Tūhoe men enlisting for war, these concerns resulted in rumours that he openly supported Germany. The Government arrested Rua after a 1915 hahunga, a bone cleansing ceremony, where he allegedly supplied liquor without a licence. He was summoned to appear before a magistrate on 19 January 1916. Rua said he would appear at the February court session as he was busy harvesting cocksfoot grass, but his non-appearance was deemed to be contempt of court and preparations began for an armed police expedition to arrest him.

On 2 April 1916 a 70-strong, and heavily armed, police party led by Police Commissioner John Cullen arrived at Maungapōhatu to arrest him for sedition. Because Rua's village was so remote, the police had to take a lot of equipment and camped on the way. They moved like a small army with wagons and pack-horses, and included New Zealand Herald photographer Arthur Breckon. So as not to alert the Maungapōhatu village of their intention to spring an attack they did not wear their police uniforms till just before the raid. They were convinced that when they reached Maungapōhatu there would be an ambush.

There was no violent resistance from Rua personally, but his supporters fought a brisk half-hour gun battle with the police in which two Māori, including Rua's son Toko, were killed and two wounded. Four constables were also wounded. Rua was arrested and transported to Rotorua, his hair and beard removed. From Rotorua, with six other Māori prisoners including Whatu, Rua was transferred to Auckland and sent directly to Mount Eden Prison. Rua was held, at first, on a nine months sentence imposed for the 1915 charges and now increased by his default of fines. After a trial on sedition which lasted 47 days, New Zealand's longest until 1977, he was found not guilty, but sentenced to one year's imprisonment for resisting the police.

When he returned to the Urewera, the settlement at Maungapōhatu was broken, divided, and the lands overgrown, much of the community having relocated. The Presbyterian Mission under John Laughton had moved into Maungapōhatu and was teaching Presbyterian Christianity and Pākehā value systems. This shocked Rua, as he had banned pākehā schools from the original community. The costs of defence at the various trials had ruined the community financially as it had to sell stock and land to meet the debt. The community was even ordered to pay the costs of the entire police operations and raid at Maungapōhatu . Even though the supreme court had found Rua's arrest illegal, and a legal petition had been drafted to Parliament on 1 May 1917 on behalf of the Maungapōhatu people calling for a full public inquiry into the events of 2 April 1916 and the behaviour of the police there and later intimidating witnesses, no compensation was ever offered to Maungapōhatu.

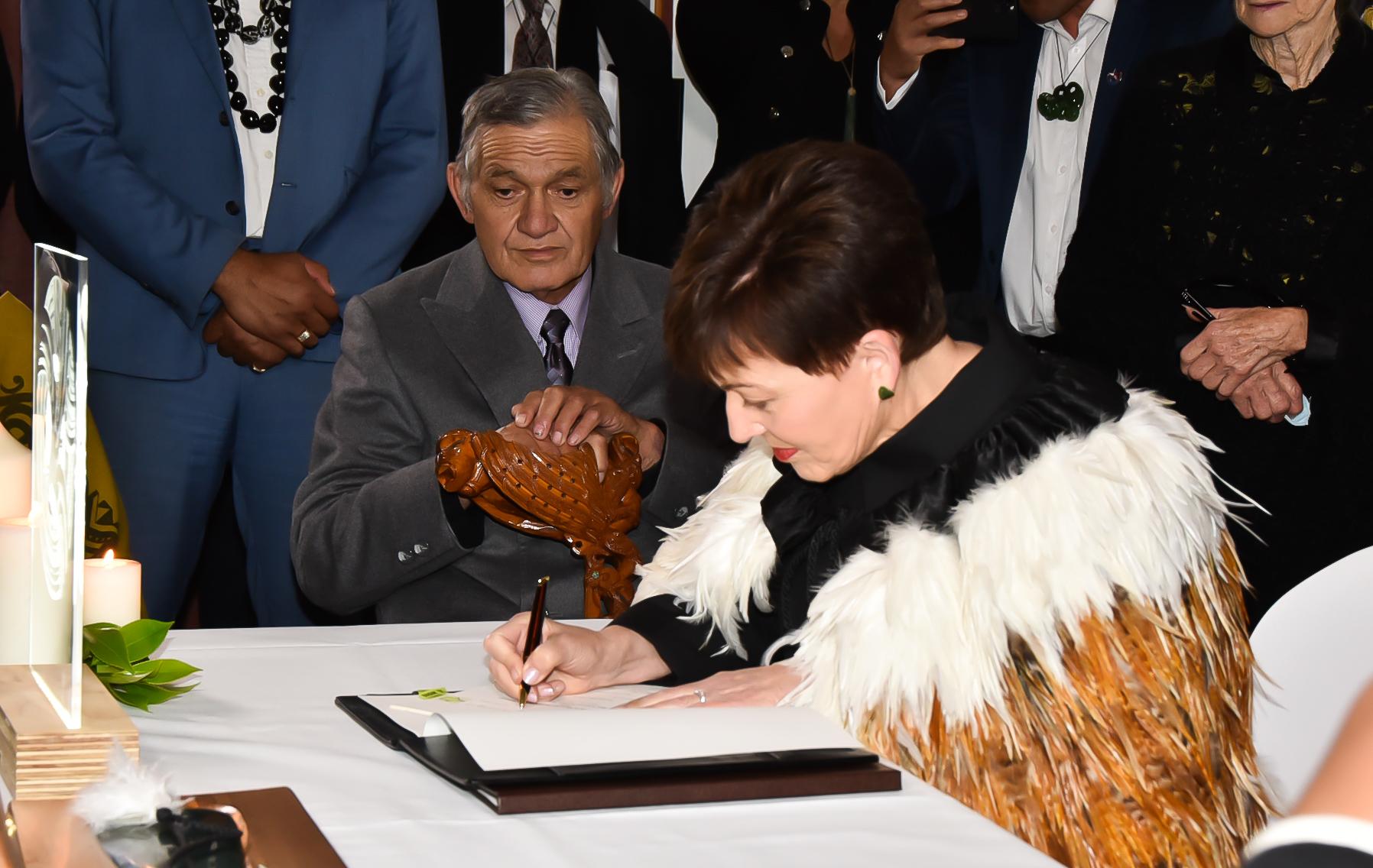
Governor-General Dame Patsy Reddy gives royal assent to the Rua Kēnana Pardon Act at Maungapōhatu on 21 December 2019, while Tūheitia Paki, the Māori king, watches on

Eventually Rua moved downstream to Matahī, a community he had founded on the Waimana River in the eastern Bay of Plenty in 1910, where he lived until his death on 20 February 1937. He was survived by five wives, nine sons, and 13 daughters. Belief in his divinity did not long survive him, however, as he failed to fulfill his promise to rise from the dead. Little now remains of Maungapōhatu, and his church (Te Wairua Tapu) boasts few followers.

== Pardon ==
In September 2017, the government committed to pardon him as part of a Treaty of Waitangi settlement. The bill giving effect to the pardon was introduced to Parliament on 22 August 2019, received its third reading on 18 December 2019, and was given royal assent three days later by the governor-general, Dame Patsy Reddy, at Maungapōhatu.

== Song ==
Rua Kēnana's legacy is also remembered in song/waiata. "Rua Kēnana" was featured in the movie Once Were Warriors.

The David Grace and Injustice version is certified New Zealand platinum

== See also ==
- Māori protest movement
- Messiah complex
- Rain of the Children
- Muru (film)
