= Māori culture =

Practices and beliefs of the Māori people of New Zealand

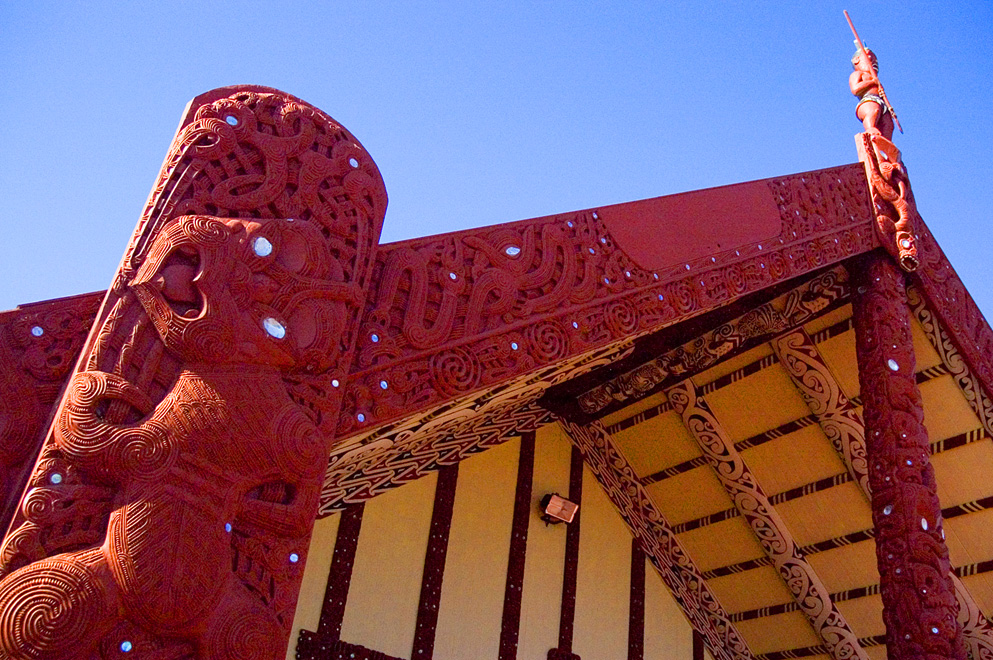
A wharenui (meeting house) at Ōhinemutu village, Rotorua, with a tekoteko on the top

Māori culture (Māori: Māoritanga) is the customs, cultural practices, and beliefs of the Māori people of New Zealand. Māori culture is a part of Eastern Polynesian culture and forms a distinctive part of New Zealand culture. The culture is found throughout the world due to a large diaspora and the incorporation of Māori motifs into popular culture.

Within Māoridom, and to a lesser extent throughout New Zealand as a whole, the word Māoritanga is often used as an approximate synonym for Māori culture, the Māori-language suffix -tanga being roughly equivalent to the qualitative noun-ending -ness in English. Māoritanga has also been translated as "[a] Māori way of life." The term kaupapa, meaning the guiding beliefs and principles which act as a base or foundation for behaviour, is also widely used to refer to Māori cultural values.

Four distinct but overlapping cultural eras have contributed historically to Māori culture:

- Archaic period – before Māori split from other Polynesian cultures
- Classic period – before European contact
- 19th century – early interaction with Europeans
- Post 1900 – till present

Māoritanga in the modern era has been shaped by increasing urbanisation, closer contact with Pākehā (New Zealanders of European descent) and revival of traditional practices.

Traditional Māori arts play a large role in New Zealand art. They include whakairo (carving), raranga (weaving), kapa haka (group performance), whaikōrero (oratory), and tā moko (tattoo). The patterns and characters represented record the beliefs and genealogies (whakapapa) of Māori. Practitioners often follow the techniques of their ancestors, but in the 21st century Māoritanga also includes contemporary arts such as film, television, poetry and theatre.

The Māori language is known as te reo Māori, shortened to te reo (literally, "the language"). At the beginning of the twentieth century, it seemed as if te reo Māori – as well as other aspects of Māori life – might disappear. In the 1980s, however, government-sponsored schools (Kura Kaupapa Māori) began to teach in te reo, educating those with European as well as those with Māori ancestry.

Tikanga Māori is a set of cultural values, customs, and practices. This includes concepts such as what is sacred, caring for your community, rights to land by occupation, and other relationships between people and their environment. Tikanga differs from a western ethical or judicial systems because it is not administered by a central authority or an authoritative set of documents. It is a more fluid and dynamic set of practices and community accountability is "the most effective mechanism for enforcing tikanga."

== History ==
Māori cultural history intertwines inextricably with the culture of Polynesia as a whole. The New Zealand archipelago forms the southwestern corner of the Polynesian Triangle, a major part of the Pacific Ocean with three island groups at its corners: the Hawaiian Islands, Rapa Nui (Easter Island), and New Zealand (Aotearoa in te reo Māori). The many island cultures within the Polynesian Triangle share similar languages descended from a Proto-Polynesian language, which itself descends from a Proto-Malayo-Polynesian language used in southeastern Asia 5,000 years ago. Polynesians also share cultural traditions such as religion, social organisation, myths, and material culture. Anthropologists believe that all Polynesians descend from a South Pacific proto-culture developed by an Austronesian (Malayo-Polynesian) people who had migrated from southeastern Asia. Other significant Polynesian cultures include those of Rapa Nui (now known as Easter Island), Hawaii, the Marquesas, Samoa, Tahiti, Tonga, and the Cook Islands. Over the last five millennia, proto-Polynesians and their descendants performed a sequence of complicated and remarkable transoceanic treks in an unprecedented accomplishment of navigation and curiosity. The final ocean travel included long distances to Hawaii, Rapa Nui, and Aotearoa.

=== Archaic period c. 1300–1500 ===
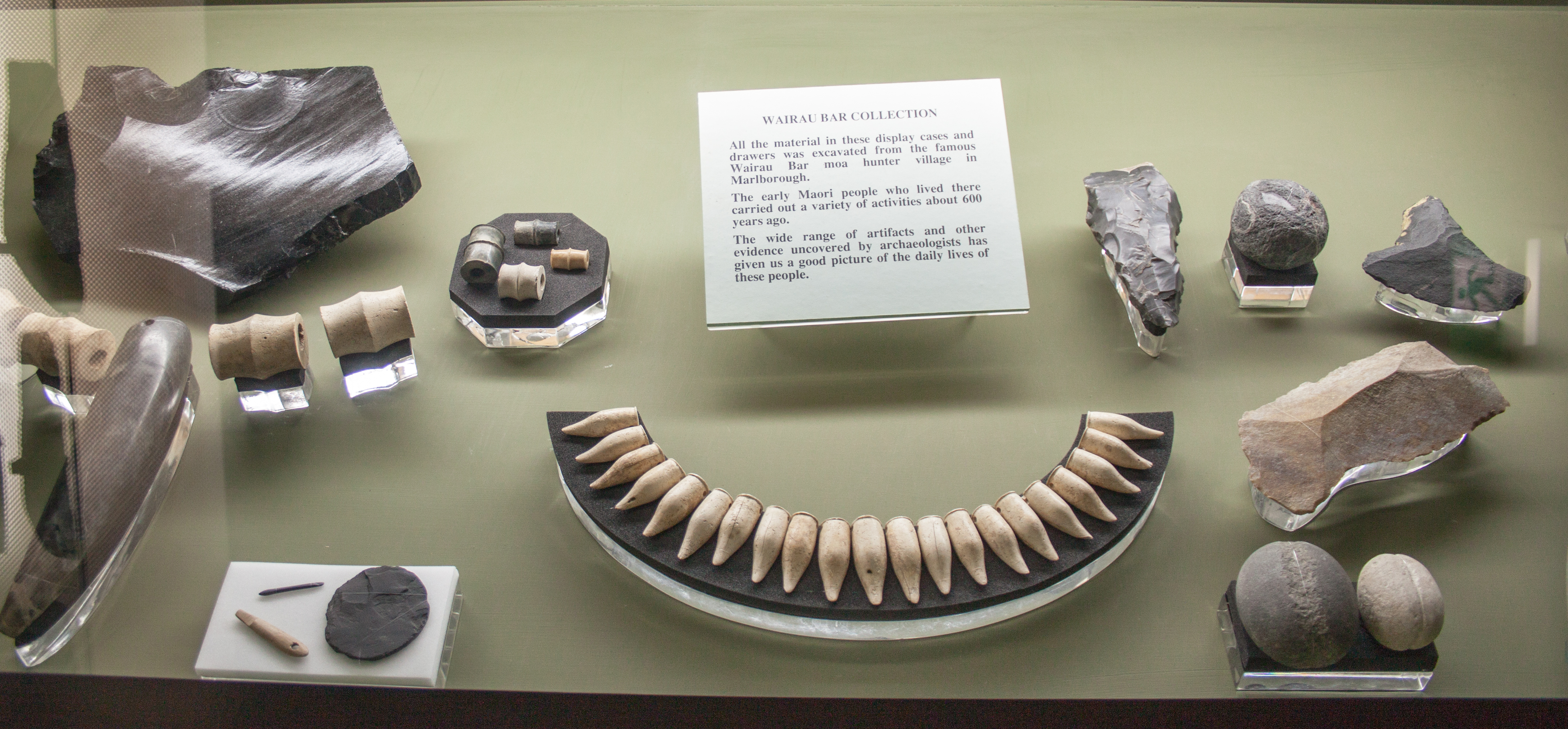
Early Māori objects similar to Polynesian forms (Wairau Bar, Marlborough), note the volcanic glass from the North Island (top left)

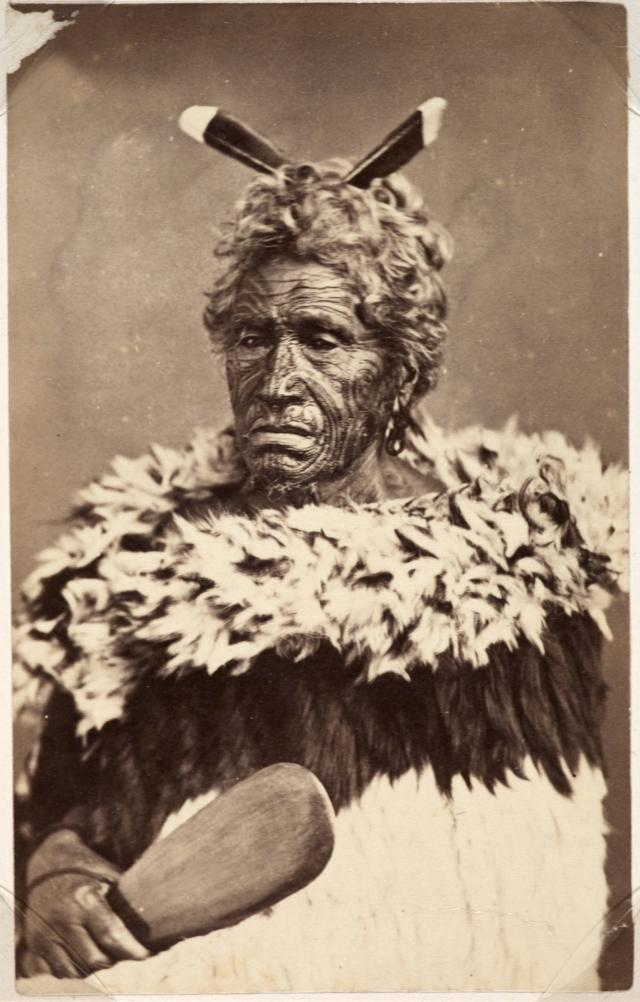
Traditional formal dress of the Classic/contact period, including a dog-skin cloak (kahu kurī), and a mere or patu (short edged weapon).

Researchers often label the time from about 1280 to about 1450 the Archaic period or "Moa-hunter period" – after the moa, the large flightless bird that formed a large part of the diet of the early Polynesian settlers. The immigrants brought many edible plants from their home islands in the central Pacific, and of these kūmara (sweet potato) would become the most important as the colder climate meant that tropical staple crops needed careful cultivation to survive, and some failed to grow locally. The kūmara became associated in several Polynesian and Māori myth traditions with Rongomātāne (Rongo-mā-Tāne or Rongo) a high-ranking atua (god) in several Polynesian pantheons as the patron of agriculture/horticulture – and who had particular associations with sweet potatoes.

These early colonists explored New Zealand to find suitable stones for tool-making. The main stone-source areas included Mayor Island, Taupō and Kerikeri for obsidian (volcanic glass); prospectors soon found pounamu (greenstone or jade) and pakohe (argillite) resources in the South Island in the areas of present-day Reefton and Nelson. Basalt was later also found which is prospected to have a use in construction. Stone served in all aspects of Polynesian life: from chopping wood to cutting and slicing food, as anchors for waka (canoes) and for fishing nets, for retaining the heat in a hāngi, as drills using chert, and for stone clubs. These practices, well preserved at the Wairau Bar archeological site, were typical of East Polynesian culture at the same time.

Two Polynesian artefacts link early settlers to Polynesia. One, a turret shell only found in the South Pacific islands, most notably in the Society Islands, has been reworked into a small chisel found at Wairau Bar and dated to about 1300. The other is a 6 cm-long Polynesian pearl fishing-lure found at Tairua in 1962. This lure has been reliably dated to the early- to mid-14th century. It was found at a typical small coastal moa-hunters' site which has been interpreted as an itinerant hunting camp (whakaruruhau). The discovery of Mayor Island obsidian on the Kermadec Islands, halfway between New Zealand and Tonga, strongly suggests that return journeys were made.

The new land also provided new opportunities: Māori learned to use local resources like pounamu, native timber, harakeke and the abundant birdlife, producing practical tools or food, as well as beautiful ornaments and items of clothing. This adaptation to the opportunities and challenges of the new environment led to the development of the Classic Māori culture.

=== Classic period c. 1500 AD ===
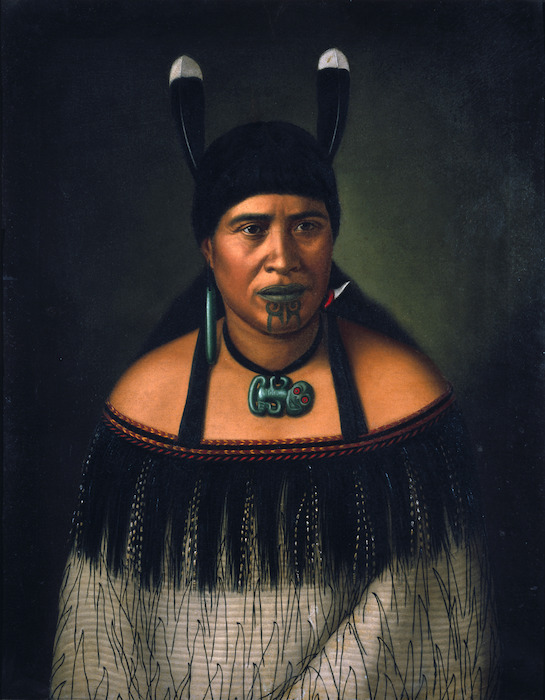
Traditional formal dress of the Classic/contact period. A hei-tiki around her neck, pounamu earring and shark tooth earring, and two huia feathers in her hair.

Māori artifacts began to change around the 15th century from an East Polynesian style to one more recognisably "classic" Māori, a style which persisted well into the contact period in the 18th and 19th centuries. At the same time, Māori groups became less nomadic, more settled in defined territories, and more dependent on gardening as a food source. Reliance on stored food such as kūmara tubers meant that stores needed to be protected from marauding neighbours. The widespread construction of large fortifications called pā on prominent hills and spurs dates from this time, as evidence of the development of a more martial, tribal culture. Not all aspects of this culture occurred universally, particularly in the South Island where kūmara could not be easily grown.

=== European contact from c. 1800 AD ===
Māori had encounters with European explorers from ships captained by Abel Tasman in 1642, James Cook three times between 1769 and 1777, Jean-François de Surville in 1769 and Marian du Fresne in 1772 which included violent encounters and also trade and exchange. Māori learnt of firearms during these encounters; it is believed the first firearms were acquired by Bay of Islands Māori around 1806.

After the European explorers, encounters at the turn of the century in Aotearoa were with whaling ships from America, France, Norway, Spain, and the British corporation the East India Company who visited regularly, setting conditions for a period of trade. Māori travelled overseas from the late 1790s with chiefs going to Sydney 'in search of bartering opportunities', and some working on various types of ships travelling to Britain, Australia and America. Small numbers of European whalers, sealers, traders, escaped convicts from Australia and runaway sailors established themselves especially in Northland and very south of New Zealand with the first Pākehā settlement at Doubtful Sound Patea in 1792. The first Christian missions clustered in the Bay of Islands: with Samuel Marsden, the senior Church of England chaplain in New South Wales fostering the foundation of the first mission station in Aotearoa in 1814–15. Marsden's party introduced horses and cattle.

With trade and travel Māori shifted to intensive horticulture and pastoral agriculture and as early as 1803 Māori were trading goods such as potatoes, pigs and maize. Māori invested in ploughs, mills, carts, and ships to transport their goods. The first Māori water-powered mill was built at Aotea, Raglan Harbour in 1846 and many more had been built by 1860.

Early industry by Māori was in part driven by the desire to trade for firearms. The Musket Wars (of 1807–1837) significantly altered intertribal conflict and there was seen a dramatic increase in casualties with many thousands of Māori people killed, some estimates over 60,000.

Populations of Māori to Europeans changed greatly during the 1800s. Henry Williams estimated in 1839 that there were only about 1100 Europeans in the North Island, with 200 of them missionaries, and a total of about 500–600 Europeans in the Bay of Islands. The northern Māori population at the time has been estimated at 30,000 to 40,000, down from about 100,000 fifty years before. This drop in population was mostly due to the introduction of European diseases (measles and influenza) and the Musket Wars. The Pākehā population doubled in the 1850s, surpassing the Māori population by the late 1860s, 1896 Māori population was about 40,000 and Pākehā was 700,000.

Alcohol was not present in Māori culture before European contact. Many Māori supported Henry Williams who opposed "the activities of grog-sellers, gun-runners and other irreligious Europeans in the Bay of Islands". The mission at "Paihia, directly opposite the notoriously lawless settlement of Kororāreka (later Russell), [was set up] to contrast Christianity with the decadent forms of European life".

European settlers brought their culture about sexuality and sexual violence to New Zealand. Sex within Māori culture was an open discussion, people chose their own sexual partners and 'accepted that sex before marriage occurred'. In Māori society assault on a woman was a serious offence different to English laws. Before 1896 under English law the age of consent was 12 years old and incest was not considered a crime. European settlers had double standards of it being more acceptable for men to have sex outside of marriage, women were blamed for prostitution and rape was rarely prosecuted. The Victorian ethos that came with colonisation undermined the role of women in Māori society.

Many Māori started adopting the Christian faith from 1830s onwards, over time creating a uniquely Māori Christianity. Burial practices changed to incorporate aspects of Christianity. Bodies were usually buried in the ground by the mid-1840s, although sometimes coffins decorated with Māori motifs were used, suspended in trees or on poles as drawn by J. Polack. These were highly tapu.

Slaves (taurekareka or mōkai) were members of rival tribes who had been taken prisoner during warfare and were made to work on non-tapu activities. The term taurekareka was also used to denote something abhorrent and signifies the complete loss of mana of slaves. During the period of the Musket Wars the number of slaves taken as prisoners increased immensely and became an important part of some tribes' social structure.

Māori hapū of the north and Britain proclaimed the sovereign independence of New Zealand in 1835 with the signing of He Whakaputanga (The Declaration of the Independence of New Zealand). A follow-up to this was the Treaty of Waitangi that was first signed in 1840, in part that the Queen of England could control her 'lawless subjects'. New Zealand was proclaimed a British colony in 1841, and the New Zealand Parliament was established in 1852. Māori had no representation in the early years (1854–1868) of the New Zealand Parliament. Votes for the members of Parliament required individual land-ownership so Māori were not able to vote as they owned land collectively. Ranginui Walker states that this "institutionalisation of racism at the inception of democracy in New Zealand was the root cause of the conflict between Māori and Pākehā in the North Island and the colonial spoliation which followed".

Māori customs, rules and values, known as tikanga, were not recognised in parliament and there was an assumption that European values and traditions were superior. The "judiciary simply denied that tikanga existed, the legislative suppressed aspects of tikanga, and together they altered the social structures of Māori in which tikanga existed, the overall effect being the social, economic, spiritual and political degradation of Māori society. To this day Māori society has still not recovered from this suppression of tikanga."

Land-ownership issues became some of the most transformative influences of the 19th century. In Māori culture collective ownership was the norm: Māori people hold a deep respect for, spiritual connection to, and responsibility for the land as tangata whenua (people of the land). As the government sought land for newly arriving immigrants, laws like the Native Lands Act 1865 changed the relationship Māori had with land. In 1870 Justice Minister Henry Sewell (in office 1870–1871) described the aims of the Native Land Court as "to bring the great bulk of the lands in the Northern Island [...] within the reach of colonisation" and "the detribalisation of the Māori – to destroy, if it were possible, the principle of communism upon which their social system is based and which stands as a barrier in the way of all attempts to amalgamate the Māori race into our social and political system." By the end of the 19th century these goals were largely met – to the detriment of Māori culture.

=== Marginalisation and renaissance c. 1900 AD to today ===
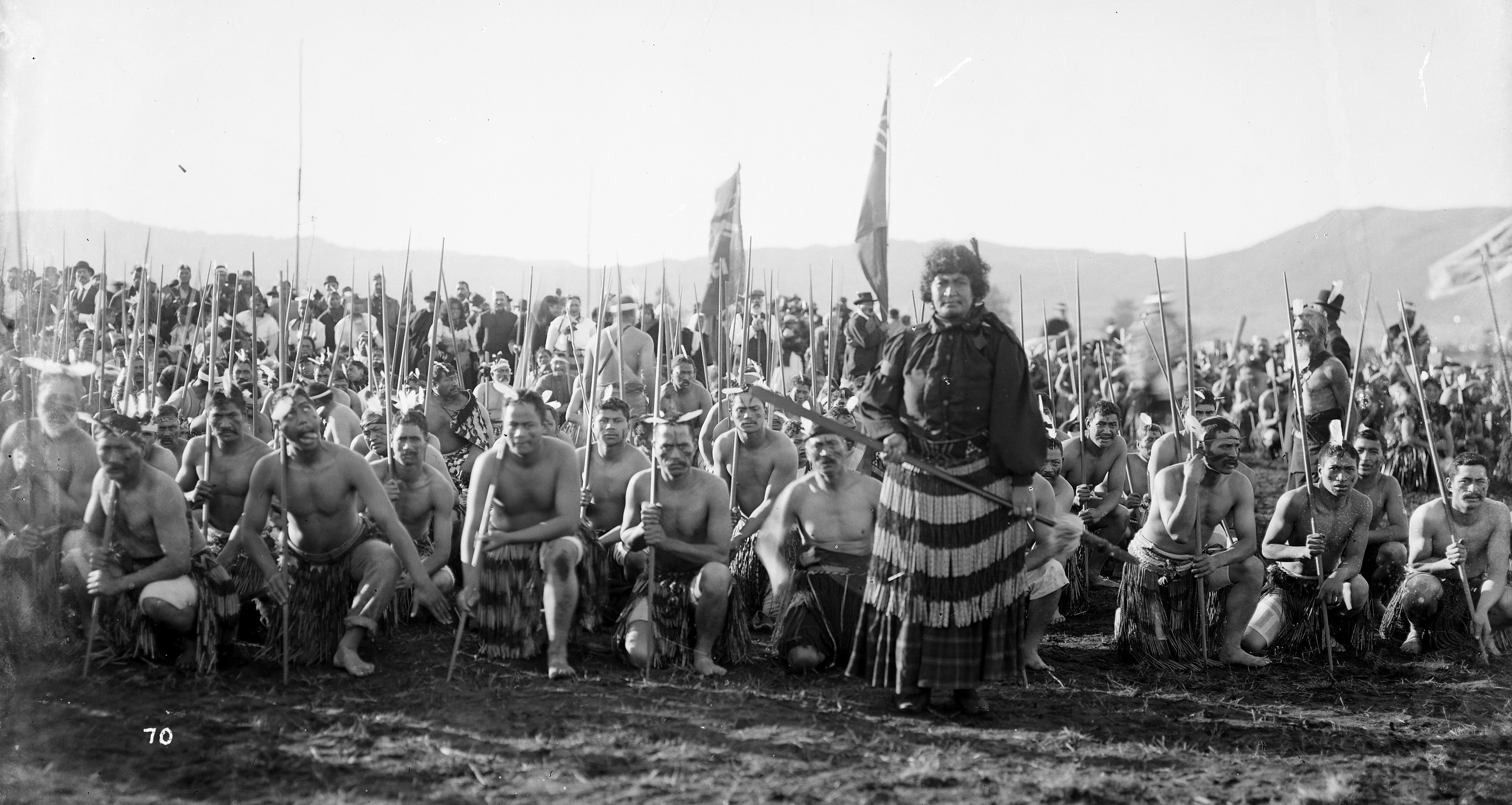
Haka party, waiting to perform for Duke of York in Rotorua, 1901

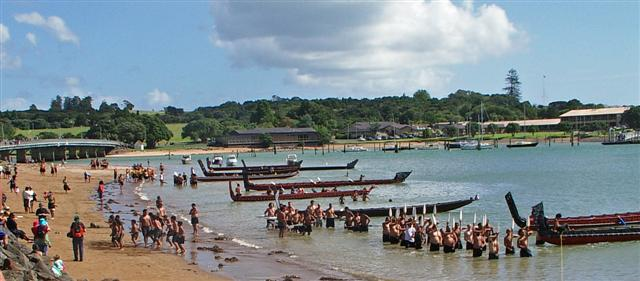
Traditional Māori Waitangi Day celebrations at Waitangi

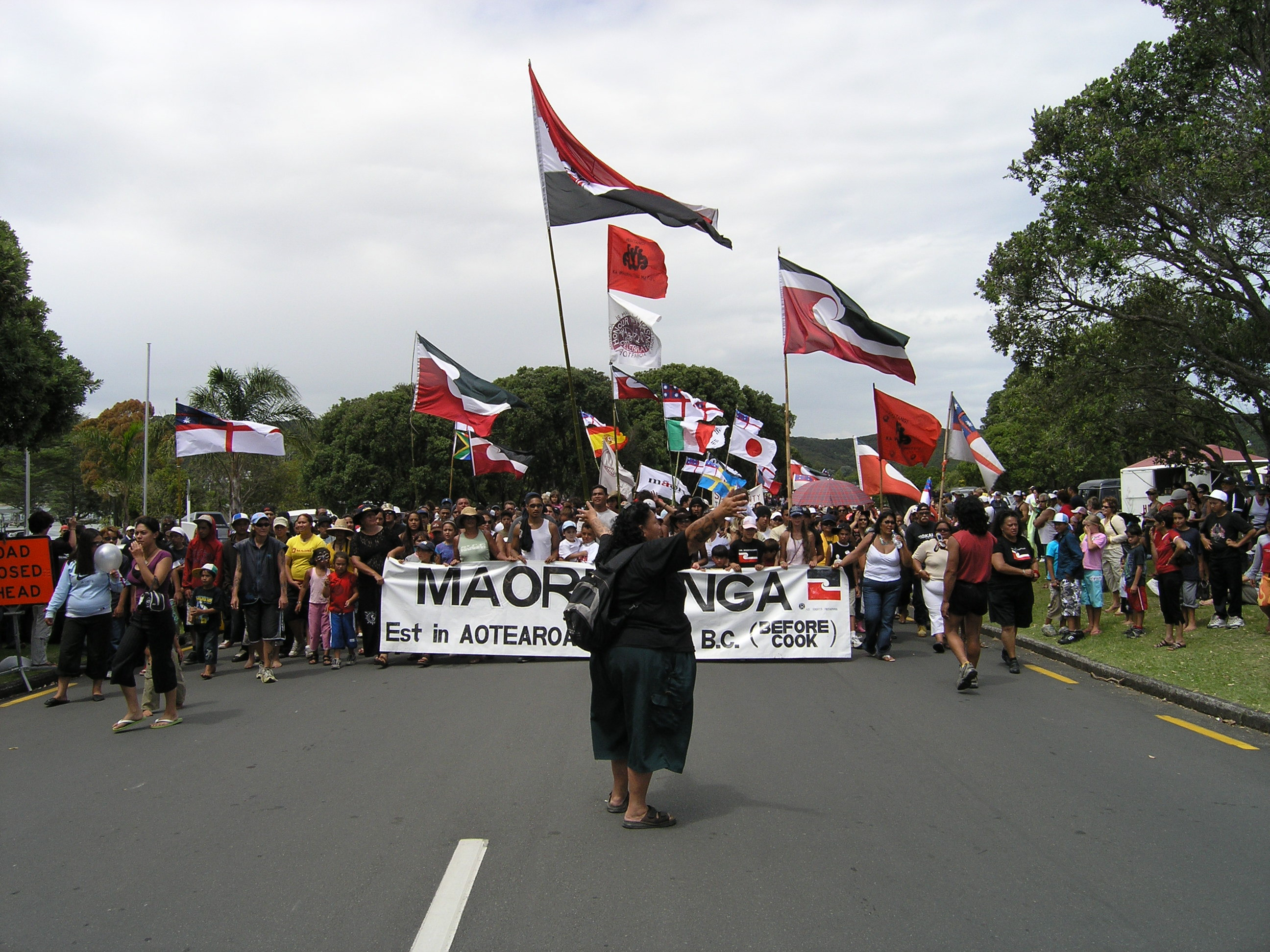
Māori protesters near Waitangi on Waitangi Day, the national day of New Zealand

Māori continued to experience significant cultural change into the next century.

In 1900 few Māori lived in European urban settlements, in 1926 there were 16% of Māori populations in urban centres, during World War II there was a shift and in 1945 it changed to 26% and it increased over the 1950s and 60s, so by 1966 it was 62%.

During the 1930s and 1940s, MP Āpirana Ngata had passed land legislation to help Māori make better use of their remaining tribal land. Māori were handicapped in using and developing the land for modern agriculture as much Māori land was steep, remote, erosion-prone with high rainfall. European farmers who owned their land freehold mechanised to gain higher productivity, using bank loans for the new equipment. Māori were unable to gain loans as their land was generally tribal land and could not be used for securing individual loans. Leasing land to European farmers gave Māori a steady income but this was spread among many people. Māori farming was often based on a different system of values and not driven by European goals of efficiency and high productivity.

Apart from jobs, another attraction to urban migration were the monetary, recreational and lifestyle attractions of the city. Many Māori felt that success lay in the city rather than the country. King describes this as a "fantasy contagion-the realty did not live up to the myth but this did not stop the fantasy or the migration". Other changes were a rising birth rate. In 1955, the Māori birth rate was nearly double the European rate at 43.6 compared to 26 per 1000. At the same time, Māori had fewer qualifications. In 1956 6.5% of Māori held professional, managerial or clerical jobs compared to 26.7% non-Māori. As a result, only 3.36% of Māori earned 700 pounds or more per annum compared to 18.6% for non-Māori. Māori were significantly impacted by changing economic circumstances such as the drop in wool prices. This made Māori more vulnerable to economic and social deprivation. King says that the lower Māori educational attainment lead to lower income jobs, which led to lower income, poor housing, and poor health, which in turn led to higher rates of crime.

These ingredients were potential causes of racial tension. They were seen by the wider community as "Māori problems". By the 1970s and 1980s, enough urbanised Māori had reached positions of influence to bring about a gradual but radical change to the thinking of governments. Their advocacy was underscored by an increasing willingness to use vigorous protest to push Mana Māori. Young urban radicals beat up a group of university students taking a comical view of Māori dance. Protestors occupied Bastion Point which was claimed as Māori land and resisted police arrest. In Raglan local Māori protesters reclaimed ownership of land used as an airstrip and golf course.

From the early 1970s a new generation of radicals arose demanding more Māori influence. Amongst the demands were for increased tino rangatiratanga. The expression, an abstraction of the word for aristocracy, had been coined by Henry Williams in the Treaty of Waitangi to convey the idea of "chieftainship". However, the term was often used by Māori to express the idea of political rights for all Māori, not just the rangatira class, or the idea of Māori sovereignty or Māori independence.

Educated urban Māori advocated the teaching of Māori language and the inclusion of a Māori point of view in all aspects of education. Māori began to express their ideas in new political movements with Māori voters switching from supporting the Labour party to alternatives such as the Māori led New Zealand First party in 1992. The introduction of MMP (Mixed Member Proportional) elections in 1996 had the effect of giving minority groups of any shades, more influence. The 1996 election produced 14 Māori MPs with 3 in the cabinet. Māori MP Winston Peters was the deputy Prime minister.

This position set high expectations for positive results from the Treaty of Waitangi Tribunal which was set up to investigate Māori grievances against historical New Zealand governments in relation to the treaty. From the early 1990s a series of favourable outcomes from the treaty tribunal resulted in a large flow of capital in the form of land, primary resources and cash from the government to various Māori iwi (tribe or nation) and hapū (subtribe or clan). A key concept was the continued occupation of an area of land (Ahi kā). The largest tribal deals approached $1 billion although many were far smaller. This gave iwi and hapū organisations a source of financial security they had not had previously. To 2013 the total paid by government exceeds $4 billion. These resulted in a more cohesive tribal organisation as all assets went to tribal or hapū organisations. In 2012 it was estimated that the total value of Māori-controlled assets was about $400 billion. As of June 2018, 70 settlements have reached the stage of being passed into legislation, with a further 45 settlements in various stages of negotiation.

== Cultural concepts ==
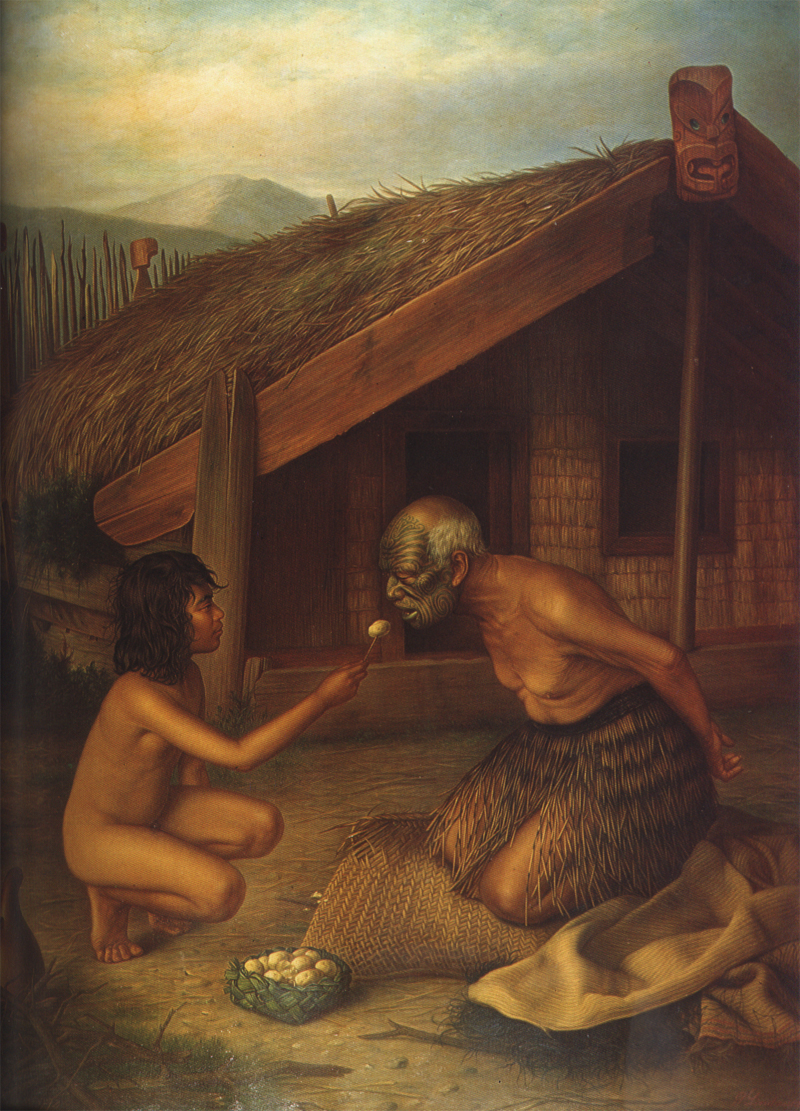
A tohunga under tapu could not eat with their hands for an extended period.

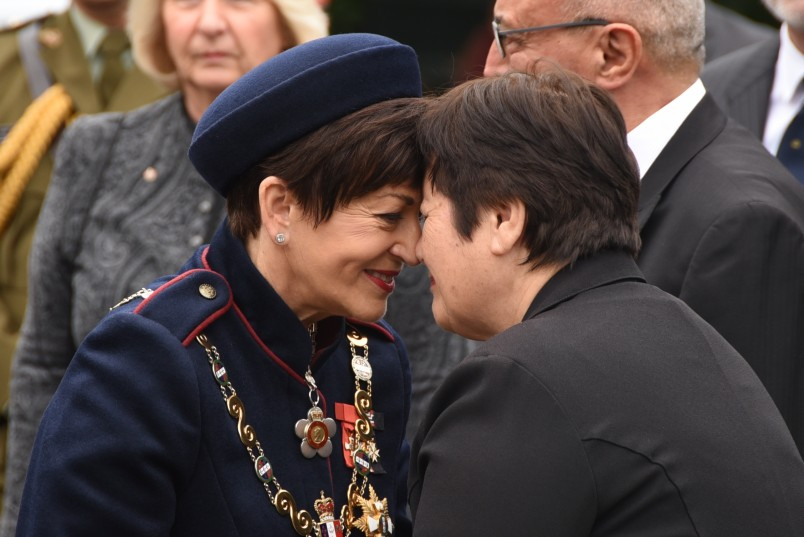
A hongi (greeting) for Dame Patsy Reddy from Kuia Dr Hiria Hape

Some of the fundamental cultural concepts of Māoritanga are present throughout Polynesia, but all have been altered by New Zealand's unique history and environment.

=== Te Ao Māori (worldview) ===
Te Ao Māori is a term widely used to refer to Māori worldview, as expressed through its many cultures and traditions. It differs from Māoritanga as much in mindset as in anything more concrete: Whereas Māoritanga is used to refer to aspects of Māori culture, Te Ao Māori encompasses the concept of living immersively within the bounds of Māori spiritual and cultural tradition and viewing the world from that standpoint.

=== Mana (power and prestige) ===
Mana is a cultural concept of the Māori, meaning a sacred power or authority. Mana is sacred power bestowed by the gods on the ancestral lineage of chiefs, or tohunga. While the mana itself is a supernatural gift, the chief is free to waste or magnify it. Historian Judith Binney says that maintaining and increasing the mana of whānau and hapū and loyalty within the group is unquestionably at the heart of Māori cultural concepts. She says that Māori cultural history is confusing to the uninformed as it consists of narrative-myths that stretch far back in time. Also confusing is that chronological time is irrelevant or distorted to the Māori cultural story, so a person living in the present may narrate a story about their family or hapū that happened centuries ago; nonetheless, the narrator appears as a contemporary figure in the myth.

A key element of cultural leadership is to link the narrator to a well known historical figure with mana (prestige/authority power).

=== Whakapapa (genealogy) ===
Whakapapa is the origin and path of descent of a person, object or geographic area. A person's whakapapa establishes their mana and tribal connections. It can be recited as an introduction (mihimihi).

Another form of introductory recital is the pepeha, a personal introduction which lists a person's connection with iwi and with natural landmarks such as rivers and mountains.

=== Utu (balance and harmony) ===
Utu is often associated with the word 'revenge'. However, in a broader sense, utu is meant as the preservation of balance and harmony within a civilisation. In the concept of utu, a fault must always be corrected and a kindness repaid. However, the means by which this is accomplished may vary greatly by case. In the context of a gift exchange, utu creates and preserves social connections and commitments. Utu recovers balance in the event that social relations are interrupted.

Muru, a form of utu, is a process of restorative justice typically between hapū and whānau groups, where acts of compensation for wrongdoing, usually physical items or resources, are given to the wronged party as a way to restore societal balance. Muru differs from utu, as once the whakawā (ceremonial judicial process) has been completed and the compensation is made, no further acts or requirements are necessary, and the balance between the two parties has been restored.

Gift exchange was governed by three basic principles. First, giving had to have the appearance of being free and spontaneous, without stipulation of a return present. Second, a strict system of obligation was in force whereby the receiver was bound to not only reciprocate but to increase the value of the reciprocated gift. Third, the system demanded that further social obligation had now been established to continue the exchanges. Failure to respond meant loss of mana or influence. Where parties had travelled a long way to give a present it was expected that the return gift be immediate but often due to seasonal food supplies it was accepted that a return gift would be given at some later date when supplies allowed. While a gift conveyed an obligation to return the favour, so did an insult. The response might be a martial one. Historian Angela Ballara describes warfare as a "learned, culturally determined [response] to offences against the rules of Māori society."

=== Kaitiakitanga (guardianship) ===
Kaitiakitanga (from kaitiaki "guardian") means guardianship or protection and in modern usage relates mostly to the protection of the natural environment.

=== Tapu (forbidden and sacred) ===
Tapu is similar to mana – both Māori concepts have parallels in wider Polynesian culture. Together, tapu and mana are seen as keeping the harmony of things. Tapu sustains structure and social order. It can be seen as a legal or religious concept, that is centred on the idea of being "forbidden" and "sacred". When a person, place, or thing is considered to be tapu, it is often distinguished as something in high value and importance, being set aside by the gods. The social mores and divine origins associated with tapu led Elsdon Best to detect the evolution of "a somewhat theocratic form of government" among pre-contact Māori.

=== Kaumātua (tribal elders) ===
Kaumātua (or sometimes Kuia for women) are respected tribal elders of either gender in a Māori community who have been involved with their whānau for a number of years. They are appointed by their people who believe the chosen elders have the capacity to teach and guide both current and future generations. It is against the rules of mana for anyone to self-proclaim their elder status, instead, the people acknowledge an elder's kaumātua status. In the past, kaumātua were believed to be "the reincarnation of a person who had acquired a supernatural or godly status after death, and who had become the protector of the family".

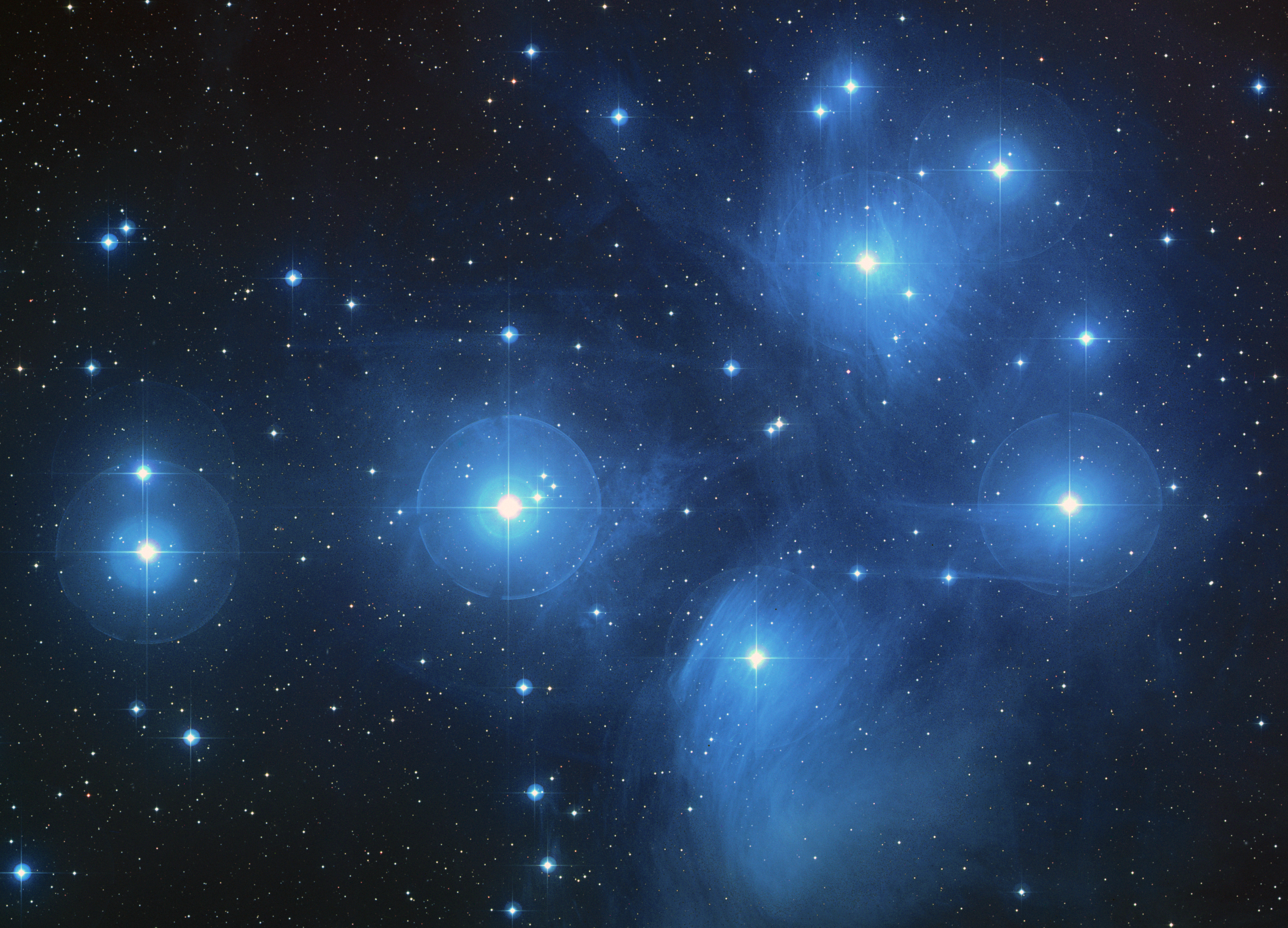
Matariki (Pleiades), the rising of which marks the Māori New Year.

=== Kōhā (gifts) ===
Kōhā are gifts to the hosts, often of food or traditional items, though money is most commonly used today. Traditionally, the essence of kōhā is that it is voluntary and comes from the heart, so to specify the amount is contrary to its spirit. Increasingly, it is common for the kōhā to be a fixed sum per head that is communicated to the guests in private, so there is no embarrassment. Recipients rely on the donors' aroha (empathy), manaakitanga (cherishing) and wairua (spirit) to ensure that it is enough. Thanks for kōhā are accordingly warm.

=== Matariki (New Year) ===
Matariki, "Māori New Year", celebrates the first rising of the Pleiades in late May or early June. Traditionally the actual time for the celebration of Matariki varies, with some iwi celebrating it immediately, others waiting until the rising of the next full moon. It is a day where they pay respect to the people they have lost but also gain over the last year that has passed. They celebrate the day and night with prayers, feasting, singing and music. After lapsing for many years it is now becoming more widely celebrated in a range of ways and over the period of a week or month anywhere from early June to late July.

== Arts, entertainment and media ==
The national annual awards for toi Māori, Māori arts, the Te Waka Toi awards define two areas of arts, marae arts (traditional, marae-based art forms for example carving and weaving) and contemporary art forms (for example theatre, literature, film, photography, sculpture and visual arts). The Kiingi Tuheitia Portraiture Award is a contemporary art award and exhibition that encourages emerging Māori artists to create portraits of their ancestors, it accepts all forms of visual arts with an uku (clay) artist winning in 2023.

=== Carving (te toi whakairo) ===
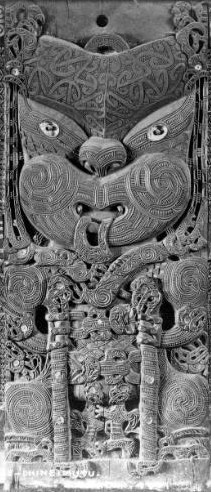
Tama-te-kapua, ancestor of Te Arawa, depicted in a carving at Tamatekapua meeting house in Ohinemutu, Rotorua, circa 1880.

Toi whakairo or just whakairo is the Māori traditional art of carving in wood, stone or bone. Some surviving whakairo, or carvings, are over 500 years old. Wood carvings were used to decorate houses, fence-poles, containers, taiaha, tool handles, and other objects. Large-scale stone-face carvings were sometimes created. The most popular type of stone used in carving was pounamu (greenstone), a form of jade, but other kinds were also used, especially in the North Island, where pounamu was not widely available. Bone was used for delicate items such as fish-hooks and needles. Both stone and bone were used to create jewellery such as the hei-tiki. The introduction of metal tools by Europeans allowed more intricacy and delicacy. Carving is a tapu art.

The Māori Arts and Crafts Institute at Whakarewarewa in Rotorua is a stronghold of traditional carving skills. The institute was initiated by political leader Āpirana Ngata who wanted to rejuvenate Māori culture and saw the arts as a vital part of that. Ngata through this process endorsed certain patterns as being 'Māori art' which excluded some patterns.

Hōne Taiapa was head of this school for some time. Since the Māori Renaissance there has been a resurgence of interest in whakairo, alongside other traditional Māori practices, with a much greater integration with mainstream contemporary art. The Māori Art Market (funded by the state-sponsored Toi Māori Aotearoa) is a significant venue for the promotion and sale of whakairo.

Notable carvers include

- Eramiha Neke Kapua (1867–1955)
- Piri Poutapu (1905–1975)
- Hōri Pukehika (d. 1932)
- Raharuhi Rukupō (d. 1873)
- Hōne Taiapa (1911–1979)
- Pine Taiapa (1901–1972)
- Inia Te Wiata (1915–1971)
- Tene Waitere (1853–1931)

Te Papa and Auckland Art Gallery have substantial holdings of whakairo, with Te Papa in particular having many digitised in their Collections online website.

=== Tattooing (tā moko) ===
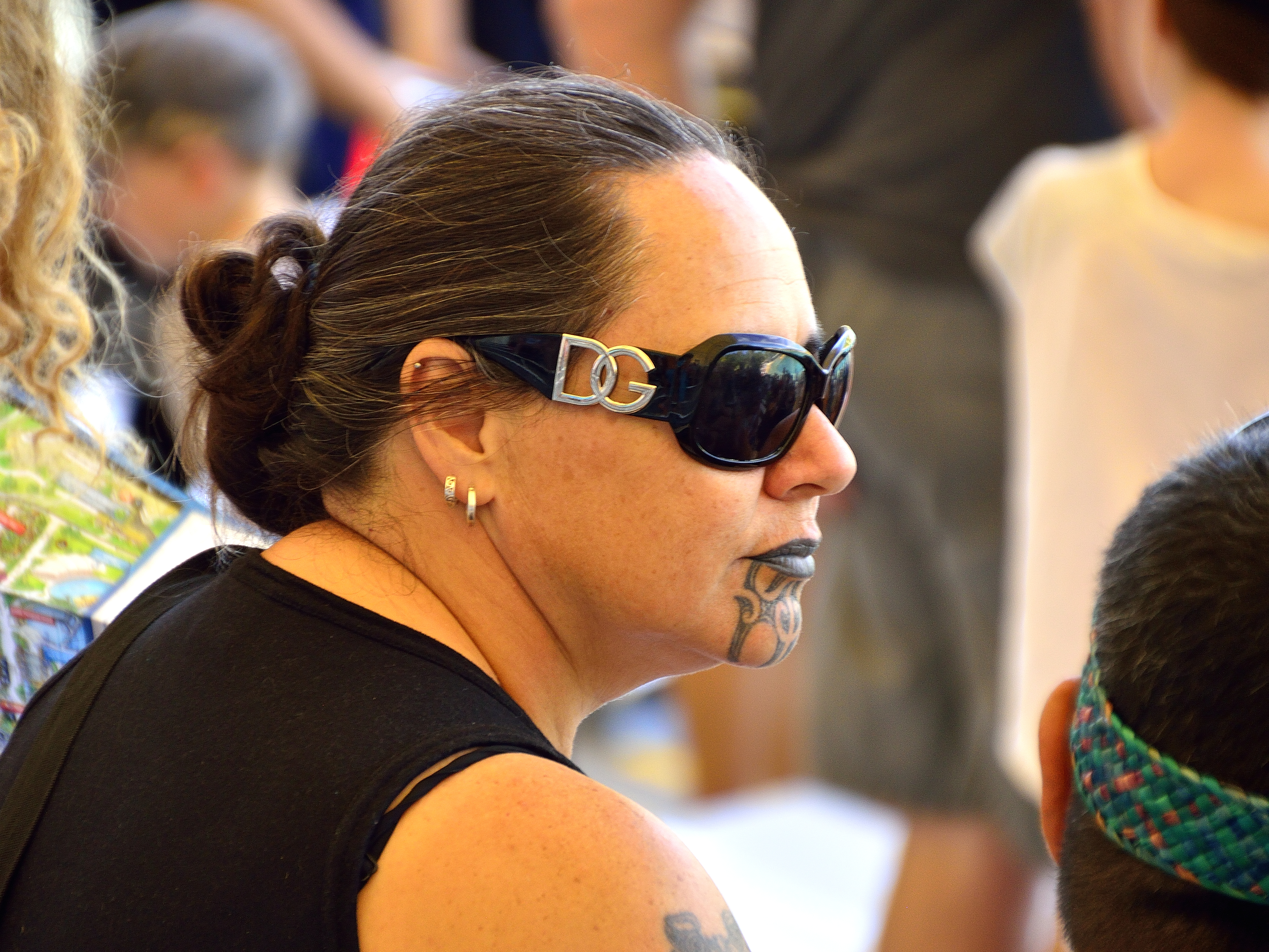
A woman with tā moko kauae

Tā moko is the traditional Māori art of tattooing the skin; a moko is an instance of the art. Prior to colonisation, most high-ranking persons received moko as an important milestone between childhood and adulthood, and those who went without them were perceived to have lower social status. The art was a sacred activity accompanied by many rites and rituals. Men generally received moko on their faces, buttocks and thighs; women wear moko kauae on their lips and chins. The facial form gives details of the wearer's lineage, status, and origin.

Historically, moko combined tattooing with scarification, in that the skin was carved with uhi (chisels), not punctured. This left the skin with grooves rather than a smooth surface. Uhi were made from albatross bone and hafted to a handle. Pigments were made from the āwheto for the body colour, and ngārehu (burnt timbers) for the blacker face colour. The soot from burnt kauri gum was also mixed with fat to make pigment. In the late 19th century uhi were gradually replaced with needles, and moko became smooth tattoos instead of textured scars.

Since 1990 there has been a resurgence in the practice of tā moko for both men and women, as a sign of cultural identity and a reflection of the general revival of Māori language and culture. Most tā moko applied today is done using a tattoo machine, but there has also been a revival of the use of uhi.

=== Painting ===
Charcoal drawings can be found on limestone rock shelters in the centre of the South Island, with over 500 sites stretching from Kaikōura to North Otago. The drawings are estimated to be between 500 and 800 years old, and portray animals, humans and legendary creatures, possibly stylised reptiles. Some of the birds pictured are extinct, including moa and Haast's eagles. They were drawn by early Māori, but by the time Europeans arrived, local inhabitants did not know the origins of the drawings.

Although the oldest forms of Māori art are Archaic rock paintings, painting was not a major art form in the Classical period. It was mainly used to produce decorative panels in wharenui (meeting houses), in stylised forms known as kōwhaiwhai. Europeans introduced Māori to their more figurative style of art, and in the 19th century less stylised depictions of people and plants began to appear on wharenui walls in place of traditional carvings and woven panels. The introduction of European paints also allowed traditional painting to flourish, as brighter and more distinct colours could be produced.

With the resurgence of Māori culture in the public sphere from the 1970s onwards came a new emphasis on painting, alongside the more traditional Māori visual art forms, as a means of asserting Māori identity and beliefs. Contemporary and recent Māori painters include Ralph Hotere (1931–2013), Shane Cotton (born 1964), Marilynn Webb (1937–2021), and Mary Wirepa (1904–1971).

=== The koru motif ===
Painted rafter pattern

The koru is a spiral shape resembling a new unfurling silver fern frond. It is an integral symbol used in whakairo, tā moko, and painting, where it symbolises new life, growth, strength and peace. Its shape "conveys the idea of perpetual movement," while the inner coil "suggests returning to the point of origin".

The koru is the integral motif of the symbolic and seemingly abstract kōwhaiwhai designs traditionally used to decorate wharenui. There are numerous semi-formal designs, representing different features of the natural world.

The logo of Air New Zealand incorporates a koru design—based on the Ngaru (Ngāti Kahungunu) kōwhaiwhai pattern—as a symbol of the flora of New Zealand. The logo was introduced in 1973.

=== Weaving (raranga) and traditional clothing ===
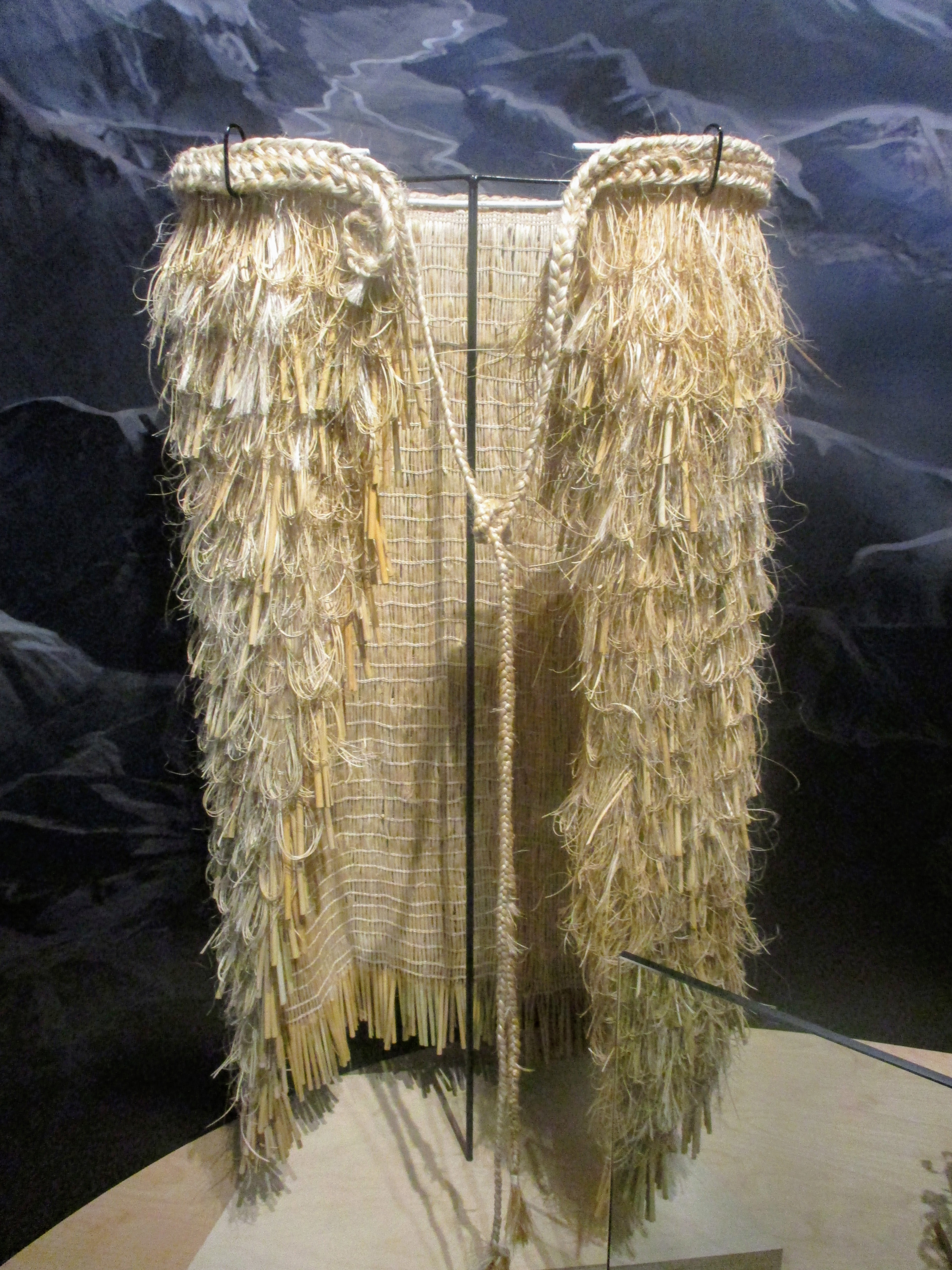
Rain cape (pākē) made out of harakeke New Zealand flax fibre muka, with outer layers of shredded tī kōuka, curdled harakeke pokinikini curled tags and muka.

Māori prior to European colonisation wore woven garments for protection from the weather and to denote social status. There were two main types of garments: a knee-length kilt or grass skirt worn around the waist and secured by a belt, and a rectangular cape or cloak worn over the shoulders. Korowai (cloaks) in particular were symbols of high rank.

Textiles were made from a number of plants, including harakeke (New Zealand flax), wharariki, tī kōuka, tōī, pīngao, kiekie and toetoe. The paper mulberry was introduced from the tropical Pacific by Māori, who knew it as aute, but it failed to flourish in New Zealand's cooler climate, and tapa (bark cloth) was rare. Kahu kurī (cloaks woven from strips of dog-skin rather than plant fibres) were rare and highly prized.

Raw flax leaves were split and woven into mats, ropes and nets, but the basis of most clothing was muka (prepared flax fibre). This was stripped from the leaves using a mussel shell, softened by soaking and pounding with patu muka (stone pestles), and spun by rolling the thread against the leg. Colours for dyeing muka were sourced from indigenous materials.

The whatu (weaving) process for clothing was performed not with a loom and shuttle but with the warp threads being twined downward by hand from a strong thread held taut between two or four upright turuturu (weaving sticks). A variety of techniques were used for fine clothing. The technique known as tāniko is a Māori innovation, producing intricate geometric designs in many colours for belts and cloak borders.

Little of the human body had to be concealed for modesty's sake. In informal settings, men went naked except for a belt with a piece of string attached holding their foreskin shut over their glans penis. Women covered their pubic area with small aprons or bunches of fragrant plant material when in the presence of men – although these parts could be exposed in whakapohane (a gesture of contempt). Pre-pubescent children wore no clothes at all. There was no shame or modesty attached to women's breasts, and therefore no garments devoted to concealing them; the pari (tāniko bodices) now worn in kapa haka performances became standard costume only in the 1950s. The European colonists regarded nudity as obscene, and cited it as a sign of Māori racial inferiority (calling them "naked savages").

Compared with European clothing, traditional garments took a long time to make and did not offer much protection or warmth. From the early sealing days, Māori working in sealing camps in the South Island adopted European clothing, which soon became widely available from itinerant peddlers. Blankets were in high demand and were often worn as kilts, cloaks, or shawls. Since the end of the 19th century, traditional clothing is only used on ceremonial occasions.

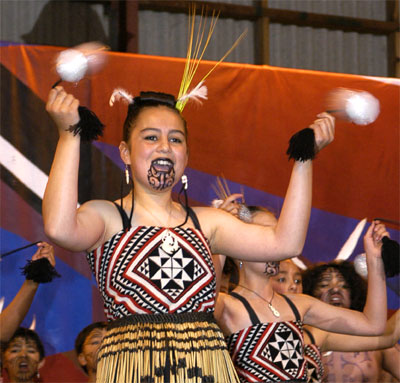
Performance of poi from a kapa haka group (2003)

=== Music (te pūoro) and dance (kapa haka) ===
Kapa haka (haka groups) often come together to practice and perform cultural items such as waiata or songs, especially action songs, and haka for entertainment. Poi dances may also form part of the repertoire. Traditional instruments sometime accompany the group, though the guitar is also commonly used. Many New Zealand schools now have a kapa haka as part of the Māori studies curriculum. Today, national kapa haka competitions are held where groups are judged to find the best performers; these draw large crowds. The common expression "kapa haka group" is, strictly speaking, a tautology.

The haka – an action chant, often described as a "war dance", but more a chant with hand gestures and foot stomping, originally performed by warriors before a battle, proclaiming their strength and prowess by way of abusing the opposition. Now, this procedure is regularly performed by New Zealand representatives of rugby and rugby league teams before a game begins. There are many different haka; though, one, "Ka mate" by Te Rauparaha, is considered the most widely known.

=== Māori literature ===
The novels of Witi Ihimaera and the short stories of Patricia Grace provide an insider's view of the culture. The Bone People a novel by Keri Hulme, won the Booker Prize for Fiction in 1985. Jacqueline Sturm was the first Māori woman to complete an undergraduate university degree, at Victoria University College, followed by an MA in Philosophy. Sidney Moko Mead wrote Tikanga Maori: Living by Māori Values, which provides a thorough introduction about the Māori way of doing things, both in the past and present.

==== Māori newspapers (niupepa) ====
Māori were quick to learn the power of the printed word. The first Māori newspaper appeared in 1842. A number of different newspapers such as Te Pipiwharauroa and Te Korimako were written in the Māori language to convey information to a widespread Māori audience, often of a political or ideological nature. Although print runs were often small it was common for a newspaper to be passed around a whole hapū. Although the government printed newspapers in Māori such as Te Karere Maori, the Kingitanga movement was anxious to convey their own message to Māori. Whereas the government and missionaries often used their newspapers as an educational tool – to inform Māori of British laws and customs – the Kingitanga countered this with arguments for self-determination. Māori newspapers eagerly reported on events from overseas that showed groups such as the Irish challenging British sovereignty to obtain home rule.

=== Film and broadcasting ===
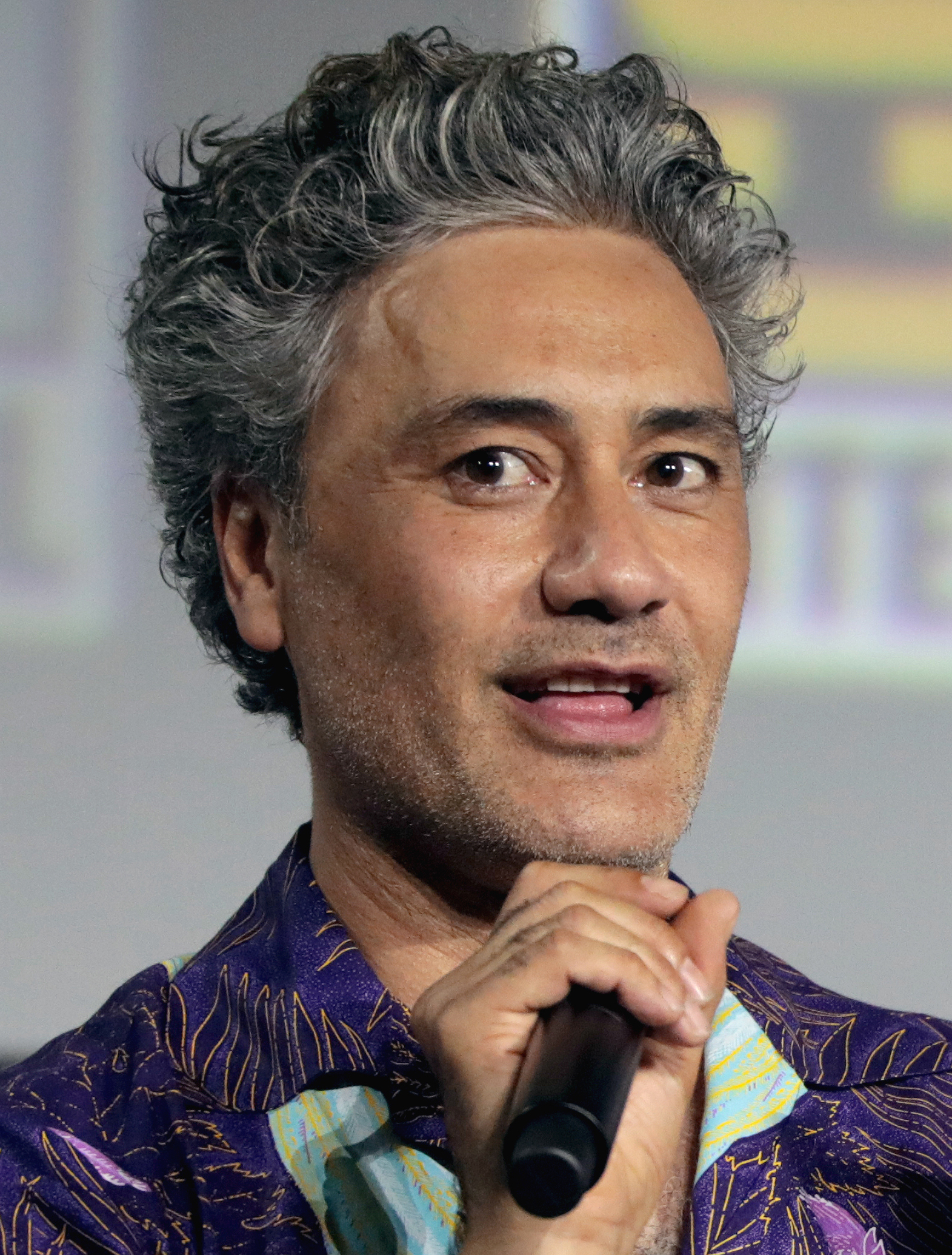
Taika Waititi at the 2019 San Diego Comic-Con

Selected films that feature Māori themes and culture include:

- The Betrayer, 1921 Australian-New Zealand film about an inter-racial romance.
- The Te Kooti Trail a documdrama released in 1927 about Te Kooti's War.
- Utu, 1983, loosely based on events from Te Kooti's War.
- Ngati, 1987, set in 1948, looking at the threat of unemployment for a local Māori community.
- Mauri, 1988.
- Te Rua, 1991, explored the links between Māori political activism, cultural identity and spiritual redemption.
- Once Were Warriors, 1994, graphic depiction of urban Māori and domestic violence, and its 2001 sequel, What Becomes of the Broken Hearted?
- Whale Rider, 2002 by Niki Caro, a 12-year-old girl's struggles for chiefly succession.
- River Queen, 2005, chronicles multi-generational frontier/Māori life and war.
- Boy, 2010, by Taika Waititi, coming-of-age comedy-drama.
- Mt. Zion, 2013, demonstrates Māori traditions and values.
- The Dead Lands, 2014, an action/fighting film set prior to European contact.

Well-known Māori actors include Temuera Morrison, Cliff Curtis, Lawrence Makoare, Manu Bennett, and Keisha Castle-Hughes. They appear in films such as Whale Rider, Star Wars: Episode III – Revenge of the Sith, The Matrix, River Queen, The Lord of the Rings, Rapa-Nui, and others, and famous television series like Xena: Warrior Princess, Hercules: The Legendary Journeys, The Lost World and Spartacus: Blood and Sand. In most cases, their roles in Hollywood productions have them portraying ethnic groups other than Māori.

In the 2010s, Māori actor-director Taika Waititi rose to global fame with the Marvel Cinematic Universe film Thor: Ragnarok (in which he played an alien named Korg), which many critics noted carried a sophisticated commentary on colonisation under the comedy. Waititi went on to win an Academy Award, which he dedicated "to the indigenous kids of the world", for the screenplay of his anti-hate satire Jojo Rabbit, in which he played Adolf Hitler as imagined by a ten-year-old Hitler Youth member. Waititi's previous films include Boy and Hunt for the Wilderpeople, both of which feature young Māori protagonists.

Māori Television is a New Zealand TV station broadcasting programmes that tries to make a significant contribution to the revitalisation of te reo and tikanga Māori. Funded by the New Zealand Government, the station started broadcasting on 28 March 2004 from a base in Newmarket.

Te Reo is the station's second channel, launched 28 March 2008. Te Reo is presented entirely in Māori language, with no advertising or subtitles. It features special tribal programming with a particular focus on new programming for the fluent audience.

=== Sport ===
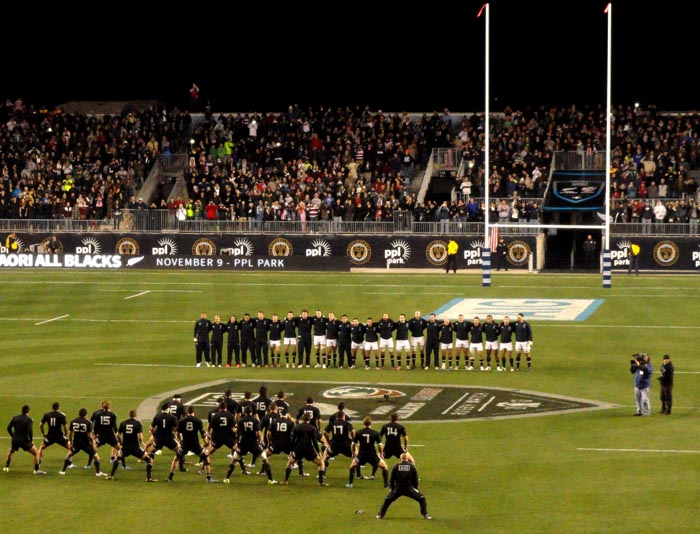
Māori All Blacks perform the haka on tour of North America (2013)

Kī-o-rahi and tapawai are two sports of Māori origin. Kī-o-rahi got an unexpected boost when McDonald's chose it to represent New Zealand. Canoe racing (waka ama) was a traditional sport that continued alongside new sports introduced by European migrants.

Māori were present in New Zealand's sporting culture since introduced sports of the nineteenth century such as cricket, running, rugby and horse racing and this has continued. Popular sports in New Zealand include rugby league and rugby union with teams the All Blacks, Black Ferns, Kiwis and Kiwi Ferns featuring many Māori players, George Nēpia Ruby Tui and Stacey Jones are some of the well-known names. Other sports in New Zealand also feature notable Māori and in 2021 canoeist Lisa Carrington was named the most influential Māori sportsperson of the past 30 years. There are also national Māori rugby union, rugby league and cricket teams, which play in international competitions, separate from the main national ones.

== Marae (community meeting place) ==
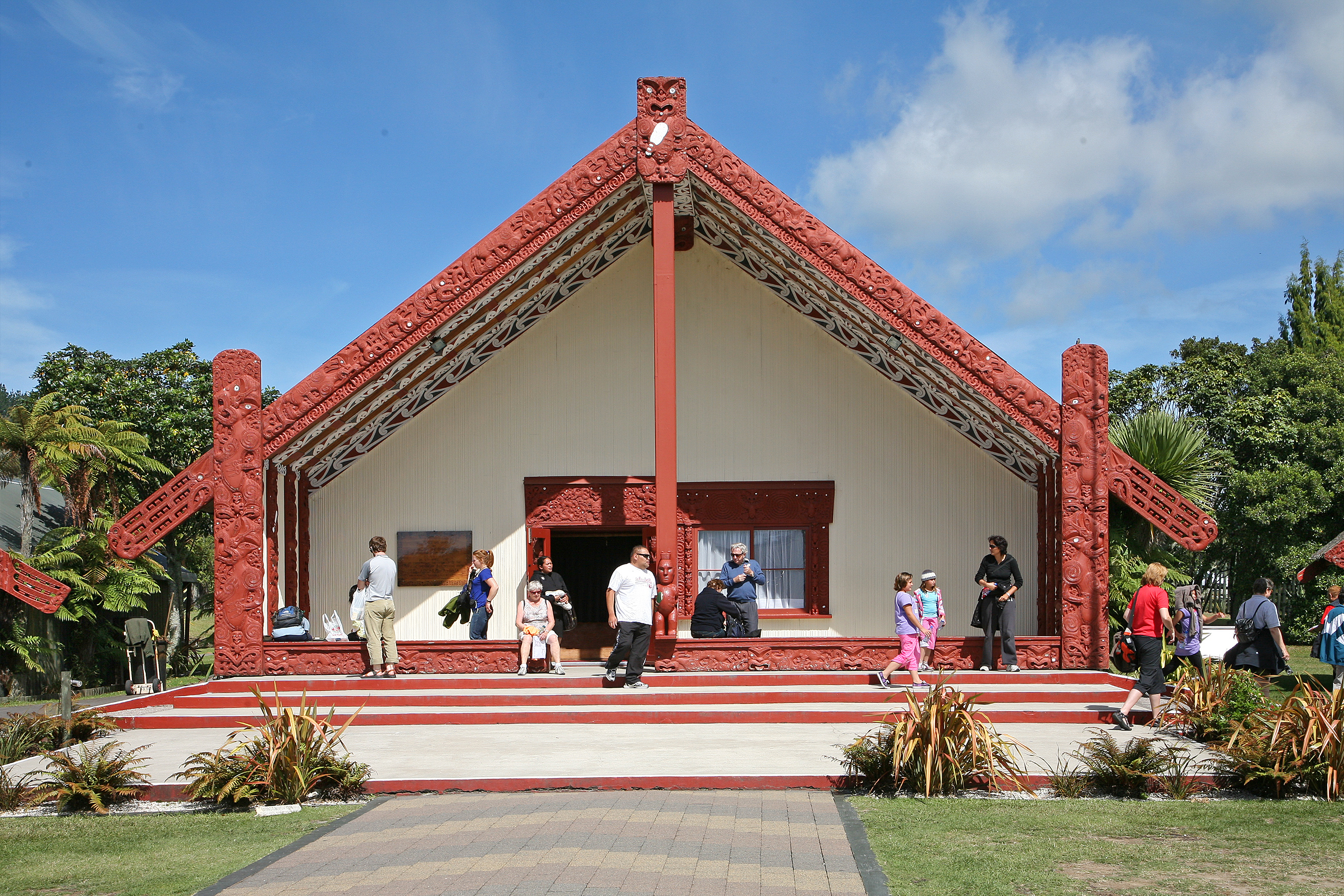
Rotowhio-Marae, Rotorua

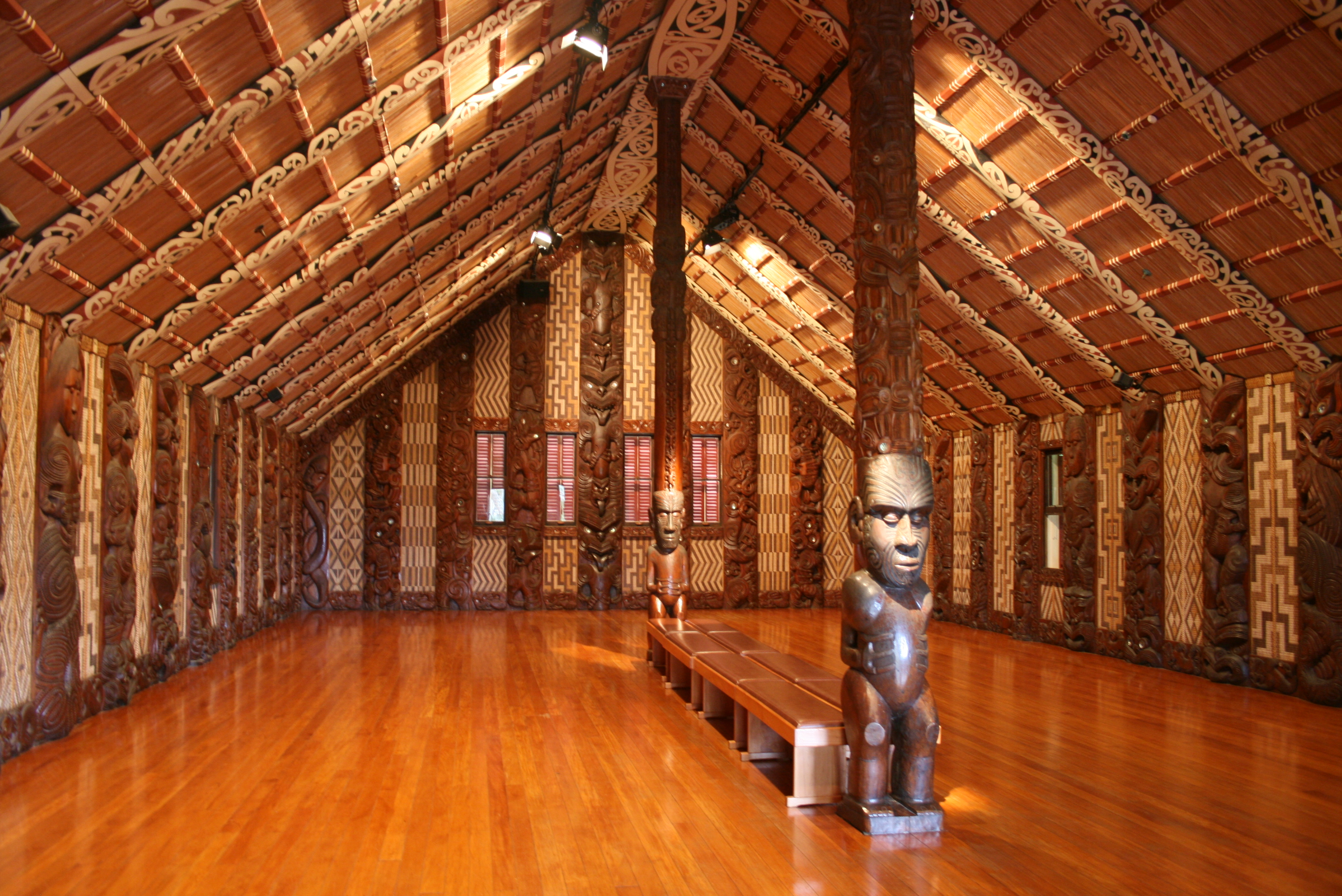
Carved wharenui at Waitangi Treaty Grounds' Te Whare Rūnanga

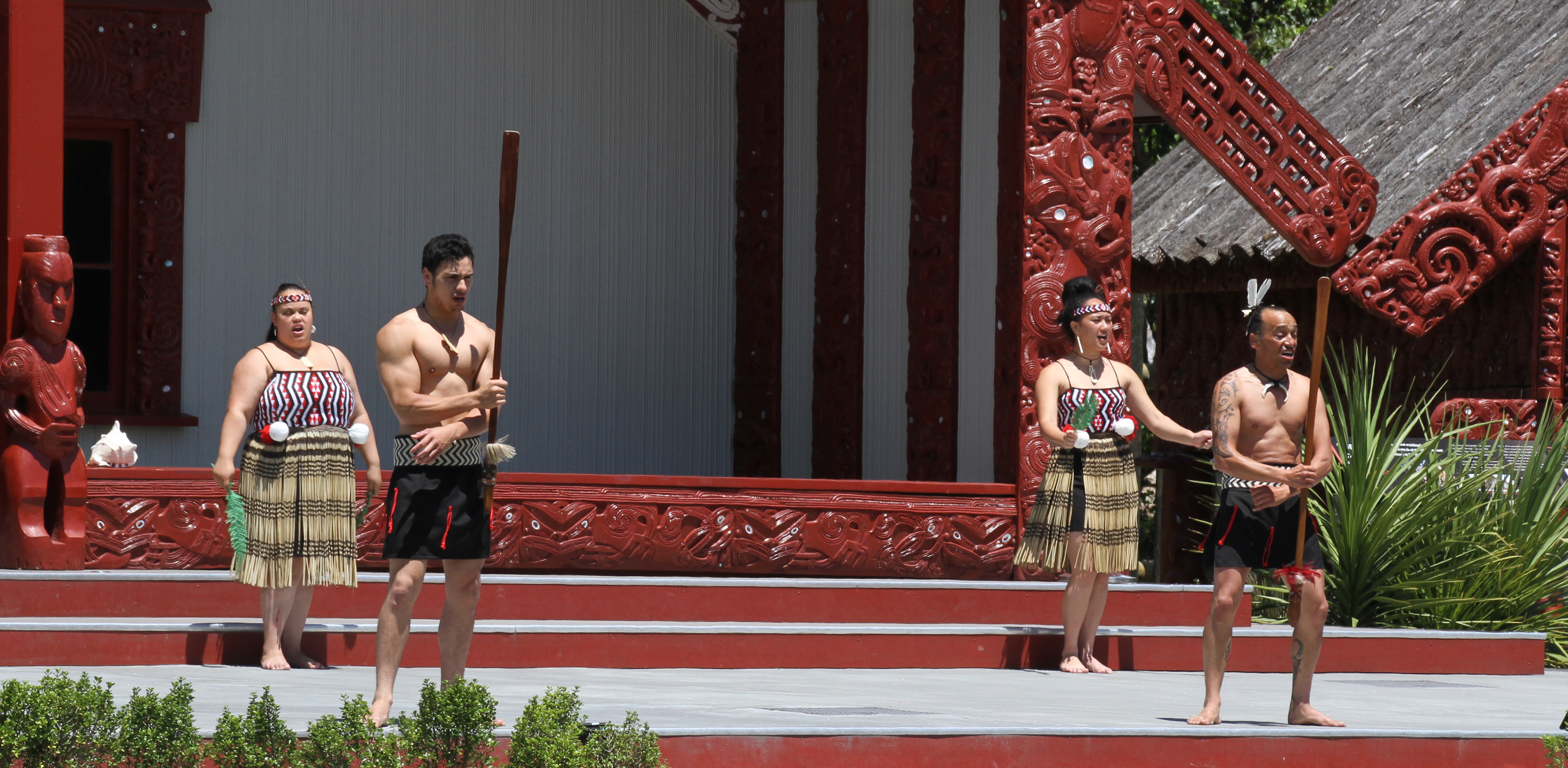
Māori welcoming ceremony (pōwhiri) on a marae

A marae is a communal meeting facility that is the place for much Māori community and cultural life. It is also a concept bigger than buildings as described by Peter Tapsell involving people and values. At the marae meetings and ceremonies take place in accordance with traditional protocols. The marae generally consists of an open cleared area in front of a large carved meeting house often called a wharenui, along with a dining hall and other facilities. Functions and events that occur on the marae include meetings, celebrations, weddings, christenings, reunions, and tangihanga (funerals).

A meeting on a marae often begins with a pōwhiri (a welcoming ceremony). The pōwhiri is structured and starts with the visitors waiting at the gate or entrance and forming group. It includes speeches following a traditional format, their sequence dictated by the kawa (protocol) of that place, and followed by waiata, songs. It is appreciated if guests can say a few words in Māori and sing a song they are familiar with as a group.

Detail of marae protocols, called "tikanga" or "kawa", vary by iwi but in all cases locals and visitors have to respect certain rules especially during the rituals of encounter. When a group of people come to stay on a marae, they are considered manuhiri (guests) while the hosts of the marae are known as tangata whenua ("people of the land").

Sharing of food is an important part of a pōwhiri. The traditional hāngī is often cooked for large groups at a marae, with communal preparation by the host group.

An important event at marae are tangihanga (funeral). Tangihanga or tangi are the means by which the dead are farewelled and the surviving family members supported in Māori society. As indicated by Ka'ai and Higgins, "the importance of the tangihanga and its central place in marae custom is reflected in the fact that it takes precedence over any other gathering on the marae". It almost always takes place on the home marae of the deceased. It is normal for Māori to travel very long distances to attend a tangi. The whanau of the deceased sit by the coffin on porch or in the wharenui porch. A tangi may go on for several days, especially for a person of great mana.

=== Marae oral tradition ===
The history of individual tribal groups is kept by means of narratives, songs and chants, hence the importance of music, story and poetry. Oratory, the making of speeches, is especially important in the rituals of encounter, and it is regarded as important for a speaker to include allusions to traditional narrative and to a complex system of proverbial sayings, called whakataukī. Oral traditions include songs, calls, chants, haka and formalised speech patterns that recall the history of the people.

=== Other traditional buildings ===
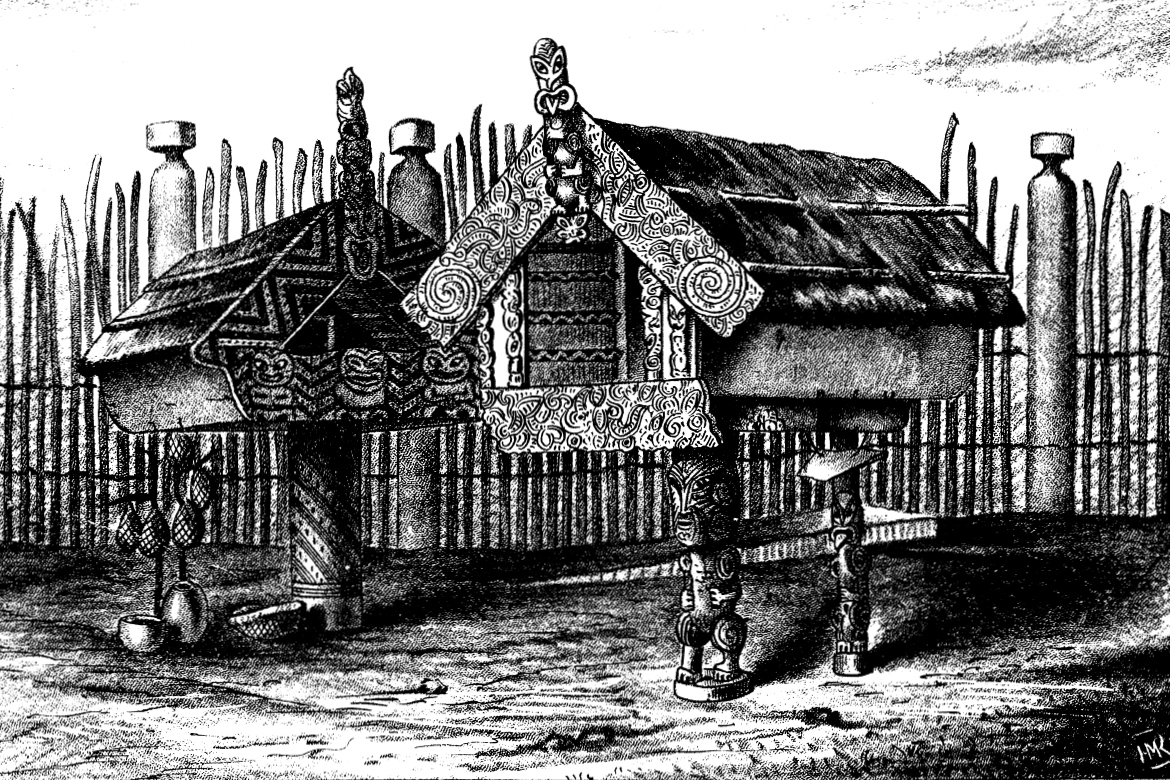
Pātaka with tekoteko

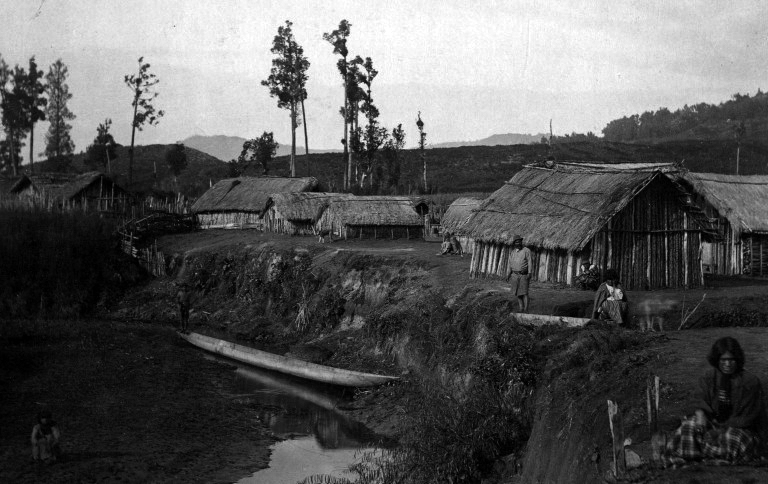
A Māori village, c. late 1800s

The standard building in a classic Māori settlement was a simple sleeping whare puni (house/hut) about 2 metres x 3 metres with a low roof, an earth floor, no window and a single low doorway. Heating was provided by a small open fire in winter. There was no chimney.

Material used in construction varied between areas, but raupō reeds, flax and tōtara bark shingles for the roof were common. Similar small whare, but with interior drains, were used to store kūmara on sloping racks.

In the classic period a higher proportion of whare were located inside pā than was the case after contact with Europeans. A chief's whare was similar but larger – often with full headroom in the centre, a small window and a partly enclosed front porch. In times of conflict the chief lived in a whare on the tihi or summit of a hill pā. In colder areas, such as in the North Island central plateau, it was common for whare to be partly sunk into the ground for better insulation.

Food was not cooked in the sleeping whare but in the open or under a kāuta (lean-to). Saplings with branches and foliage removed were used to store and dry items such as fishing nets or cloaks. Valuable items were stored in pole-mounted storage shelters called pātaka. Other constructions were large racks for drying split fish.

During the construction of important buildings, slaves were sometimes used as a sacrifice. This practice was done in order to express the buildings' significance and to secure the gods' protection. For smaller buildings, small animals were sacrificed to distinguish it from other buildings and to exhibit its uniqueness.

The traditional Māori whare continued to be used in rural areas in particular well into the post-contact period. They were usually very small with a dirt floor and full of vermin, especially fleas. In winter a central fire was lit that filled the whare with smoke which slowly filtered through the roof. Even as late as 1849 George Cooper, the assistant private secretary to George Grey, described a village in the relatively affluent lower Eastern Waihou River area as "a wretched place, containing about a dozen miserable raupo huts all tumbling to pieces". 11. In the 19th century settlements were hapū-based, and 5 buildings became standardised: the sleeping whare, kāuta or communal cookhouse/shelter, whata or wood store, pātaka or storehouse, and increasingly from the 1870s wharepuni or community meeting house. Significant finance and mana was invested in increasingly elaborate meeting houses which became a source of hapū or iwi pride and prestige.

A meeting house was likely to have outside carvings and increasingly as European tools were used, intricate interior carving and woven panels depicting tribal history. Rotorua became a centre of carving excellence under the encouragement of the Māori MPs in the Young Māori party. Itinerant specialist carvers travelled widely, employing their skills in many locations. Meetinghouses became places for tribal celebrations or political meetings, especially after the 1860s Land Wars. They were a place to display largesse and enhance mana with elaborate feasts and entertainment. By the 20th century wharepuni were common and averaged 18–24m long by 8m wide. There were no Māori buildings of this size in pre-European days. As Māori became familiar with European building construction and design they incorporated features such as chimneys and fireplaces and made use of bigger doorways and windows as well as sawn timber but even by the turn of the 19th century toilet facilities were often primitive, despite the urgings of the Māori MPs Māui Pōmare and Āpirana Ngata who worked hard to improve the standard of Māori dwellings over their many years in office.

== Mythology and religion ==
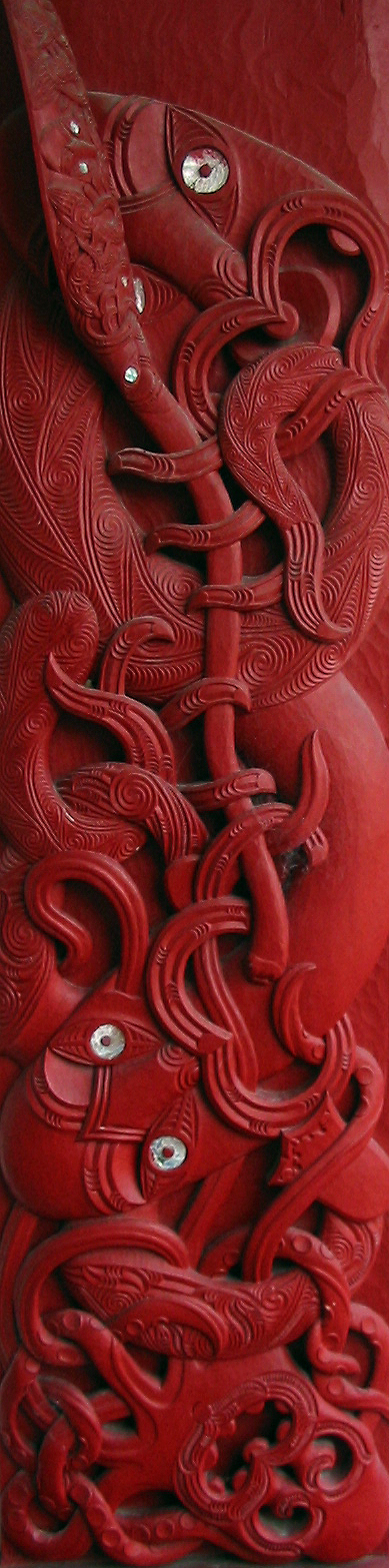
Late 20th-century carving depicting the mythological navigator Kupe fighting two sea creatures

Traditional Māori religion has deviated little from its tropical Eastern Polynesian roots on the island of Hawaiki Nui. Accordingly, all things were thought of as possessing a life force or mauri. The god Tangaroa was the personification of the ocean and the ancestor or origin of all fish; Tāne was the personification of the forest and the origin of all birds; and Rongo was the personification of peaceful activities and agriculture and the ancestor of cultivated plants. (According to some, the supreme personification of the Māori was Io; however this idea is controversial.)

Christianity plays an important role in Māori religion today. In the early 19th century, many Māori embraced Christianity and its concepts. Large numbers of converts joined the Church of England and the Roman Catholic Church, both of which are still highly influential in Māori society.

=== Health and traditional beliefs ===
Classic Māori viewed disease as a punishment for breaking tribal tapu, but tohunga recognised that some families were prone to a certain disease. The standard practice of tohunga was to isolate the victim in a small shelter. The most common serious disease was tuberculosis (kohi), which was present in the colonising Polynesians. Classic Māori did not recognise the symptoms as being from one disease. Kohi was considered the work of demons and caused by mākutu (witchcraft). Toketoke was the name of the devil that caused tubercular bone disease. Tuberculosis of the neck glands was called hura or hone. This was very common. Tubercular ulcers were called pokapoka. The early European explorer and painter Earle noted in 1827 that these diseases were common even in isolated inland districts such as Taupō. His Māori advisers said the diseases were very old.

Earle recognised that tohunga used a range of plants to treat minor skin ailments. Much later European doctors advocated investigation of the medicinal properties of plants commonly used in Māori medicine.

=== Missionaries ===
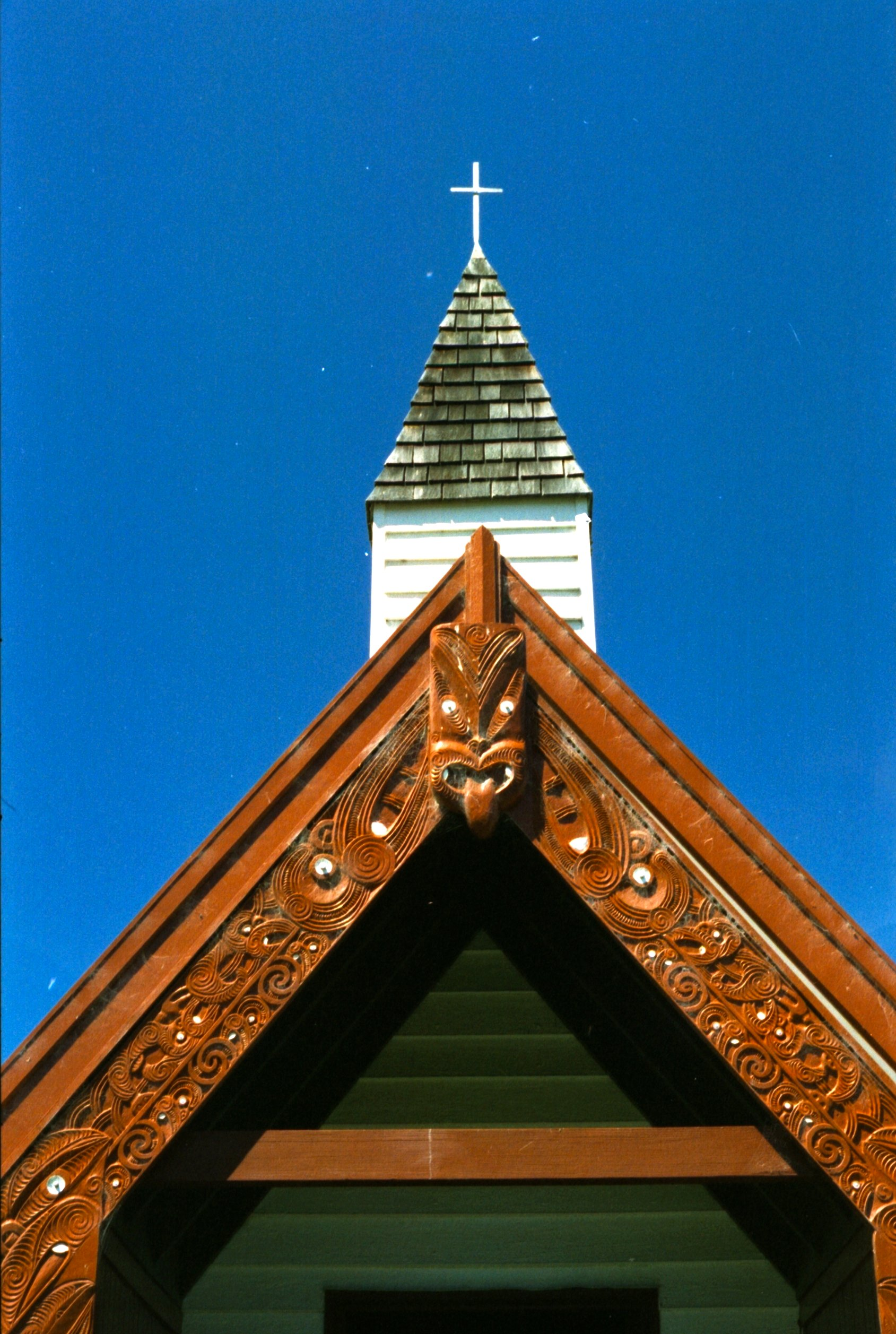
Church near Ōnuku marae, Banks Peninsula. Opened in 1878 as the first non-denominational church in New Zealand.

Church Missionary Society (CMS) missionaries insisted Māori abandon cannibalism and child infanticide before they could be baptised. They tried to discourage polygamy. Some early missionaries had sympathy for abandoned wives but Henry Williams was adamant that polygamy disqualified Māori from baptism. CMS missionaries also outlawed the use of further moko, taking part in lewd dances and practising customary funeral rites. Catholic missionaries who arrived 20 years after the Church of England CMS missionaries were less concerned with stopping these customary practices before Christian conversion. They reasoned that they could influence Māori more effectively after baptism and were subsequently successful in attracting many converts in the western Hokianga district, away from the dominant CMS influence.

Missionaries did not arrive in the Waikato until about 1834–5. CMS Mission Stations were established at Manakau, Maraetai, Waikato Heads, Kaitotehe opposite Tuapiri, Te Awamutu, Kopua and Kāwhia. Missionaries helped explain the Treaty of Waitangi to Tainui in 1840.

=== First Māori interpretation of Christianity ===
In the 1830s Te Atua Wera started the Papahurihia Faith in opposition to the missionaries. It mixed Christian, Judaic and Māori customary influences. They held services on Saturday and called themselves Hūrai or Jews. Te Atua Wera reverted to the more customary role of a tohunga figure by the late 1830s. Te Atua Wera taught that heaven was a place where there was happiness, no cold or hunger with an abundance of flour, sugar, muskets, ships, murder and voluptuousness.

== Children and education ==
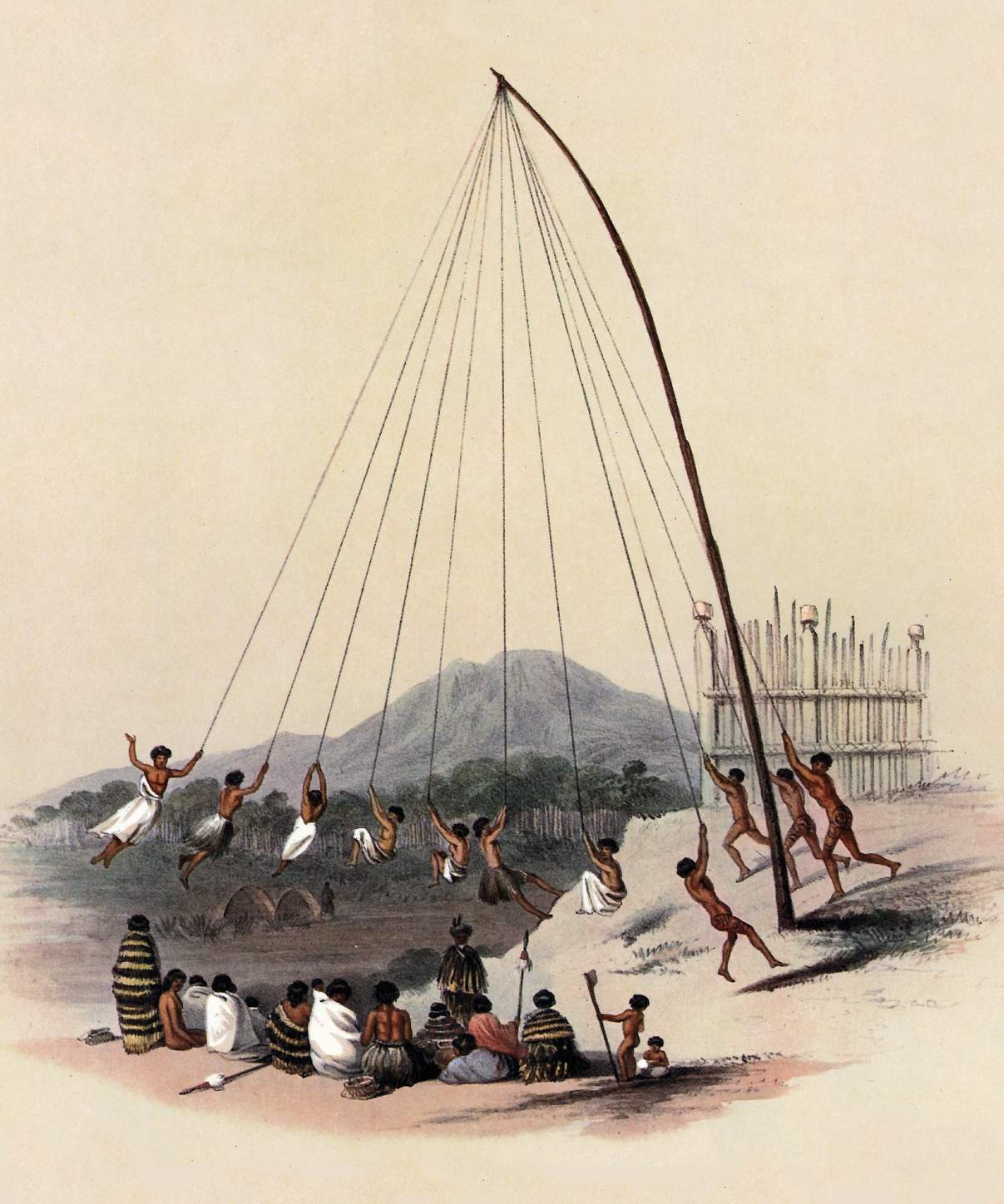
A group of Māori children on a morere swing (1847)

=== Childhood ===
Early European reports suggest that Māori children were indulged and led a carefree and playful life. A French explorer in 1772 commented that "[the women] seemed to be good mothers and showed affection for their offspring. I have often seen them play with the children, caress them, chew the fern-root, pick at the stringy parts, and then take it out of their mouth to put it into that of their nurslings. The men were also very fond of and kind to their children." French missionary Jean-Simon Bernard wrote, disapprovingly, in 1844: "The children here are completely free; the parents never do anything to them. They never beat them and do not allow anyone else to beat them." The killing of children could be a take (cause) of war. Circa 1812 the north-Taranaki Ngāti Tama iwi killed two Ngāti Maniapoto boys during a visit to friends at Motuawa near the Mōkau Heads. This led to a Ngāti Maniapoto reprisal raid about three years later when warriors pretended to be peaceful visitors and launched a surprise attack on Ngāti Tama.

The concept of whāngai (adopting or fostering children) has been, and still is, important within Māori whānau. It is the practice of raising nieces, nephews, cousins and other wider-family members as if they were members of the immediate family. Whāngai are adopted children who are raised with a whānau, most often as another member of that whānau, like a brother or sister.

Historian Paul Moon writes of missionaries reporting how families forced some of their young girls into the sex trade with the object of obtaining valuable and scarce English goods in the 1820s. He describes how, when a new ship arrived, the fathers came to take girls as young as 10 out of school. Moon records reports of widespread infanticide in Māori settlements—particularly the killing of baby girls, of slaves captured in battle or of half-caste children. Other historians such as Vincent O'Malley demonstrate that reports of this type are contradictory and often unreliable. Sam Ritchie points out that Moon fails to contextualize his interpretation of missionary writing and accepts it at face value without adequately considering other sources or the reasons behind such reports. Census figures in the 19th century showed a marked male/female imbalance throughout the North Island amongst Māori children. The 1857–8 Māori census recorded 32,329 males and only 23,928 females.

In modern times, child abuse among Māori has received a great deal of media attention. From 1978 to 1987 the Māori child-homicide rate was 1.15 times the non-Māori rate. However, between 1991 and 2000, the Māori rate rose to more than 3.5 times the non-Māori rate and from 2001 to 2005 the Māori child-homicide rate reduced to 2.4 times that of non-Māori. As part of a response to these statistics, national Māori child-advocacy organisation Te Kāhui Mana Ririki formed in 2008. Te Kāhui Mana Ririki has commissioned research into traditional Māori parenting in order to tackle child abuse in the Māori community.

=== Education ===
According to oral information Māori were familiar with the concept of schooling in tradition times as taught by tohunga. Bishop Selwyn took adult Māori to Sydney where they experienced limited schooling to learn English. When missionaries back in arrived in the Bay of Islands they realised that if they were going to introduce Christianity and change what they considered to be barbaric practices like cannibalism, slavery, lewd dancing and having multiple wives, they would need to establish schools. Both the missionaries and their wives constructed schools and provided slates and bibles as reading material. The first school was established by Thomas Kendall in 1816. Recently original slates and written material from that period in the Bay of Islands has been located, photographed and published. Some adults attended school but most pupils were the sons or daughter of chiefs or other persons of status.

By 1853 Mr and Mrs Ashwell had been running a mission school at Taupiri in the Waikato for 50 Māori girls for 3 years. The girls learnt arithmetic and reading. In the early 1860s Governor Grey had provided money to support a trade school near Te Awamutu in the Waikato. The aim was to produce Māori workers who were literate but could also work with, and repair, agricultural machinery as used on farms and in the new flour mills. In 1863 Rewi Maniapoto attacked and burnt down the school, stealing the printing press. He aimed to kill leading Europeans in the area but they had been warned by friendly Māori and left before the attack. Because of the negative influence of Maniapoto and other anti-government factions, the school had previously had poor attendance, with as few as 10 boys attending regularly. All teaching by missionaries was in Māori and this continued in the native schools until 1900 when at the insistence of the Young Māori Party Māori MPs, schools started teaching in English. Influential Māori MPs Ngata and Pōmare insisted that Māori be taught modern ways and sponsored the Suppression of Tohungaism Act in parliament. Pōmare, in particular, worked hard to banish ancient Māori concepts and practices that caused harm in the Māori community.

== Food ==
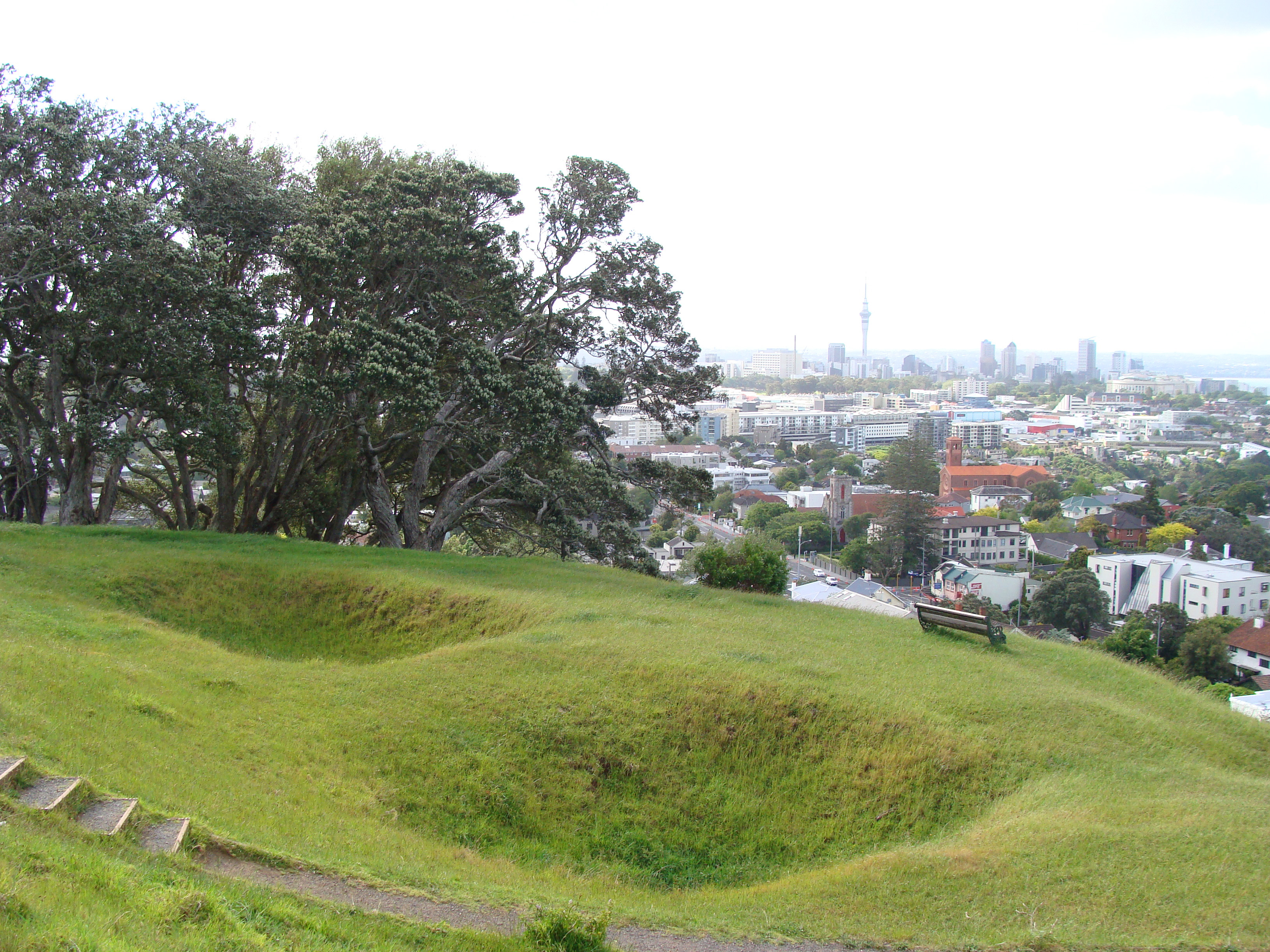
Pits where kūmara were stored to protect them over the winter.

Hāngī or earth ovens are still used today to cook food

=== Traditional Māori foods ===
Eating shellfish such as mussels and oysters was very common. During summer sea fish such as kahawai were caught using bone or mangemange hooks, 2-piece lures or large flax nets. In creeks and lakes, eels were caught in large numbers when migrating along known waterways using hīnaki, a long cone-shaped net. Birds such as ducks were targeted during the moulting season and young birds such as Petrels and Gannets were taken from nests and cooked in their own fat to preserve them. Such preserved birds were favourite gifts to fulfil social gift obligations. Māori closely observed the natural world to take advantage of seasonal opportunities. Native pigeons ate miro berries which made them thirsty. Māori carved wooden bowls equipped with multiple neck snares and placed these in miro trees to catch these large birds.

Evidence from many recent Eastern Golden Bay excavations, especially at Tata Beach, shows that in middens local shellfish and fish bones were most prominent, followed by dog (kurī) and rat bones. Less common were bones from small birds and sea mammals. The Tata Beach site and other nearby sites such as Takapou were in use from 1450 up to 1660 AD, well into the Classic period. The coastal sites showed that Māori had created man-made soils in the sand dunes ranging from small to very large (over 100m^{2}). The natural soil A horizons had been modified by placing dark, humus-rich soil near the surface. This practice was widespread in Māori communities where kūmara was grown, although in many cases free-draining sand, gravels and pumice were mixed with humus-rich loam. Kūmara are slow-growing in the temperate NZ climate and need free-draining subsoils. In the Eastern Golden Bay north-facing slopes were favoured.

The warmer climate of the north and northern and central coastal regions allowed better growth of brought subtropical plants such as kūmara, yam and gourds. In Auckland, and on Mayor Island, volcanic land was cleared of rocks which were used for low shelter walls. In some areas piles of volcanic rock which kept warm at night, were used to train the vines of gourds.

Many special techniques had been devised to grow and especially to store kūmara so it did not rot. Careful storage and use of tapu was essential to prevent unauthorised use. Seed kūmara in particular were highly tapu. The main problem for kūmara growers were native caterpillars. Early European explorers reported that Māori often ringed a garden with burning vegetation in an attempt to control caterpillars. Māori continued to use traditional fern roots—aruhe—as a normal part of their diet into the mid-19th century.

=== Introduced foods ===
The introduction of European foods changed many aspects of Māori agriculture. Under tradition, Māori agriculture land was abandoned after a few crops because of reduced production. This was the common pattern apart from a few very fertile alluvial river valleys. Fertiliser was not used although Māori had devised various techniques to enhance production such as the addition of pumice or similar materials to improve drainage on heavy soils. Māori allowed gardens to revert to shrubs and plantations were shifted to another area. The introduction of foreign weeds which thrived was a significant issue from the 1820s but offset by the widespread growth of the introduced potato, emerging traditional varieties of which are still grown and known as taewa.

European farms and the methods they used became a cultural and economic magnet for Māori in the North, in Auckland and later in the Te Awamutu area of the Waikato. Under the tuition of missionaries, Māori learnt to mass-produce food, especially potatoes, far in excess of their own needs for trading into the late 1850s. In 1858 European numbers equalled Māori numbers and increasingly European farmers were able to supply towns such as Auckland. At the same time the strong market demand for supplying food to the gold rush markets in Australia and California ended.

== Trade and travel ==
=== Transport ===
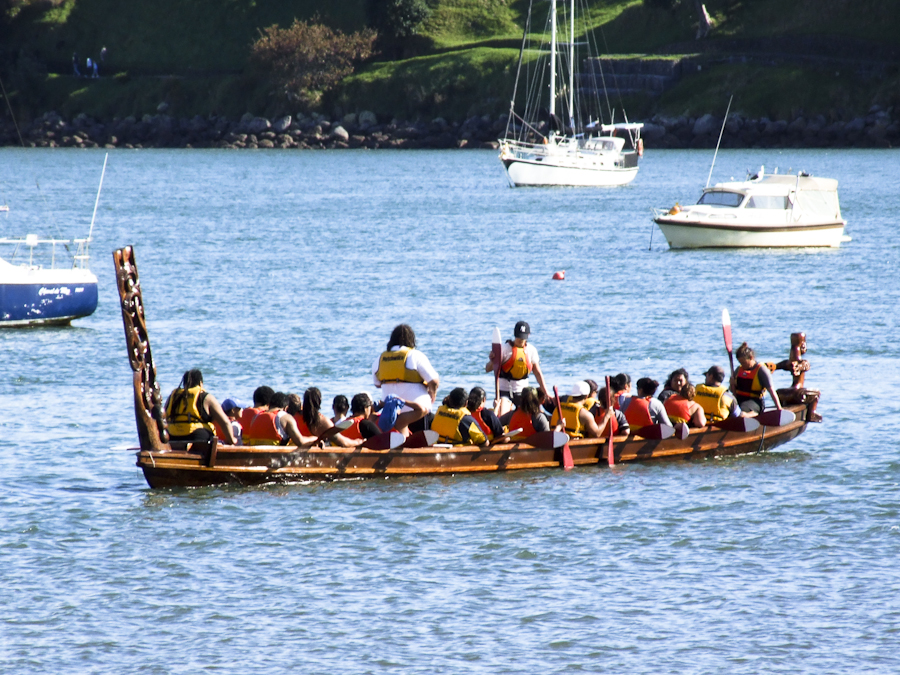
Waka (canoes) are built in a variety of sizes depending on their purpose, including deep-sea fishing, river crossings or historically war and migration.

The normal Māori method of travel was on foot. The North Island had an extensive network of single lane one metre wide tracks that traversed beaches, plains, valleys and mountain passes. Some of these tracks were used by many iwi and were considered neutral territory. Missionaries who travelled with Māori guides found that at river crossings canoes were left for the use of any traveller. Between 1840 and 1850 numbers of explorers, artists, government officials including Governor Grey travelled inland with the aid of Māori guides. The guides carried heavy loads and would carry Europeans across creeks. Crossing swamps was common. Although they carried some food they relied on purchasing basic foodstuffs such as potatoes or native pigeons from Māori settlements. The most popular payment was in tobacco which was in great demand. In more remote areas travellers sometimes found Māori living by themselves and growing a few potatoes.

Canoes (waka) were used extensively. These ranged from small river-going boats, to the large waka taua sea-going war vessels carrying up to 80 paddlers, and up to 40 metres (130 ft) long. Waka were used extensively for long-range travel down the east coast and to cross Cook Strait. In 1822–23 Te Rauparaha, who had established a base by capturing Kapiti Island, reconnoitred the upper South Island in waka before launching a seaborne invasion the following year against Ngāi Tahu and Rangitāne iwi. Te Rauparahā later hired a European ship to attack Akaroa Harbour. This showed that Te Rauparaha was prepared to use Western technology to further his own goals. Henry Williams, who followed several war parties, reported as many as 50 waka taua travelling together at one time, although he reported they only went out to sea in relatively calm weather. From 1835 large numbers of European ships entered the Bay of Islands every year with Henry Williams reporting an average of 70–80 ships per year. Many Māori men worked on the ships, with a reported average of eight Māori seamen per whaling ship. Ten metre long whaleboats began to be used by Māori. They could be both rowed and sailed. In the 1850s as Māori with the active encouragement of Grey embraced trade were gradually able to develop a large fleet of small trading schooners and similar craft. All the initial European centres had been supported by Māori.

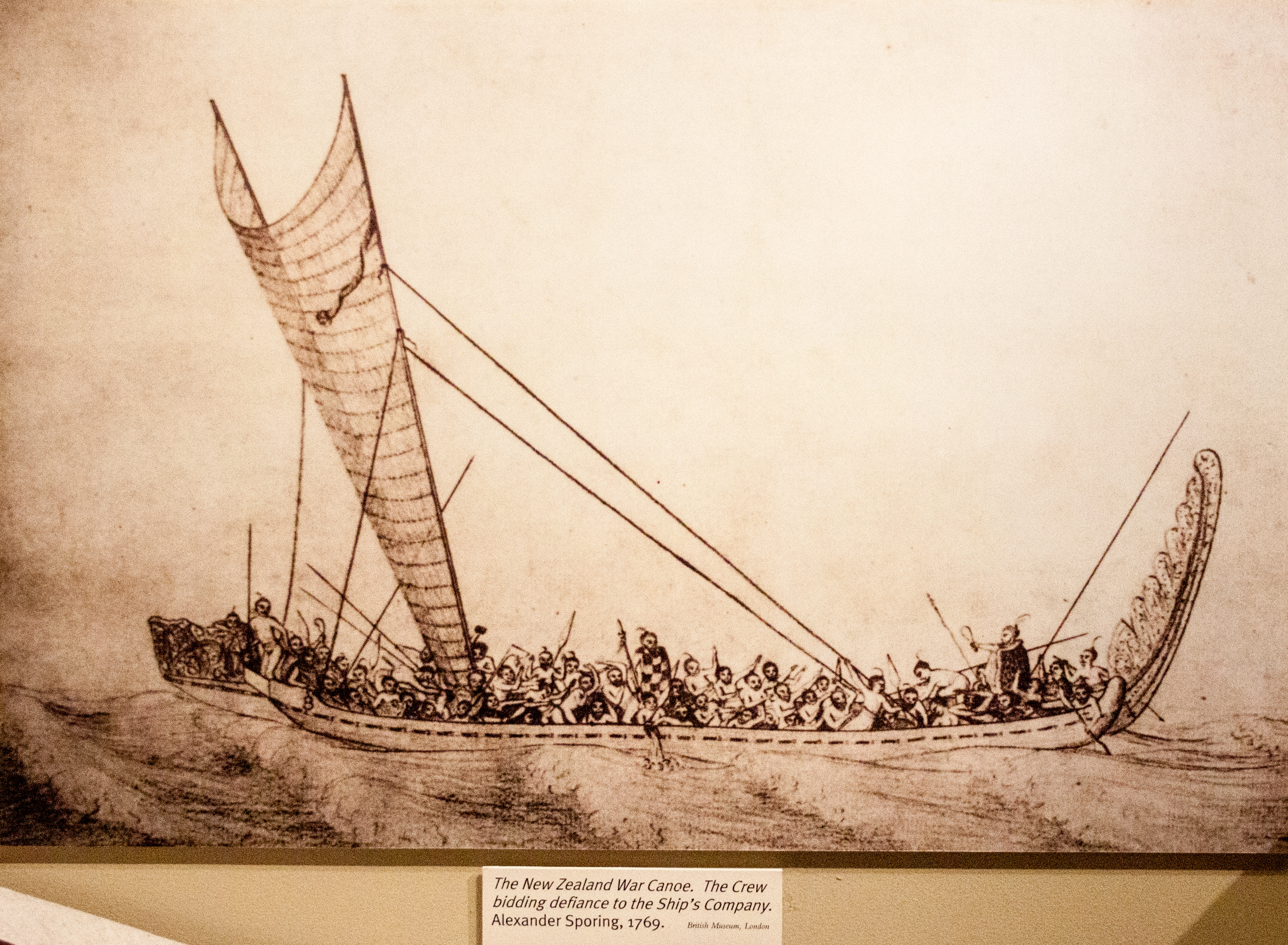
Māori war canoe, drawing by Alexander Sporing, Cook's first voyage, 1769

During the mid 19th century Auckland and Northland Māori dominated shipping trade. In 1851 51 vessels were registered and 30 smaller vessels licensed. By 1857 there were 37 schooners. The fleet increased steadily during the Tasman trade boom of 1853–56. Māori paid customs duties to the government and invested heavily in vessels, so suffered considerably when a dramatic market slump hit New Zealand especially effecting the Auckland–Waikato–Hauraki area. During the musket war period and for a time afterwards, Māori, isolated from their tribal support by these devastating conflicts, hid in isolated places, living off patches of vegetables they grew in tiny gardens. This practice was very common in Taranaki which had been devastated by Waikato attacks in particular. European explorers, such as Dieffenbach, often stumbled upon these survivors while exploring. He described these whare as hotbeds for rats and vermin.

=== Trade ===
With the arrival of Europeans Māori gradually started to trust the value of British money and use it as a medium of exchange instead of goods. This was rare before 1834 but became increasingly common as more Māori worked as sailors on European ships, where they gained a good reputation as being strong capable workers.

By 1839 a large proportion of the Māori trade in goods was paid for in cash, with Māori showing a strong preference for coins rather than paper banknotes. Northern Māori learnt that they could more easily hide cash from their relatives avoiding the traditional obligatory sharing of goods with their hapū. The period 1835 to 1840 completed the revolution in the north Māori economy with Māori abandoning many of their former trading habits and adopting those of the Europeans to the point where Māori became dependent on the flow of European goods to maintain their new way of life.

The effect of trading increased the influence of chiefs over their hapū. Northern traders assumed that the chief was the organisational head of the hapū and all trade went through him including payments for goods purchased. This gave chiefs much more influence, especially after 1835, because trade was so regular. In pre-contact times the power of chiefs was never very great, largely being restricted to directing warfare. Early European observers noted that at hapū and whānau hui (meetings) every person, including women, had their say and the chief had no more influence than any other person on the final decision. Where a chief had great mana, especially powers of persuasion, chiefs had more influence because of their personality rather than any recognised authority.

Not all iwi had regular contact with Europeans. The French explorer Jules Dumont d'Urville visited Tasman Bay in 1827 and using knowledge he had picked up at the Bay of Islands was able to communicate with local Māori. He found that although they had some passing awareness of Europeans—they seemed to know about firearms—the extent of their understanding was far less than that of the Northern Māori.

In the Waikato regular contact did not start until five decades after contact in the north of New Zealand. It was not until Ngāti Toa was forced out of Kāwhia in 1821 that the bulk of the Tainui people had contact with Europeans. In 1823 a man called Te Puaha visited the Bay of Islands, bringing back with him Captain Kent who arrived on his ship, Elizabeth Henrietta, at Kāwhia in 1824.

By 1859 trade was the main area in which Māori interacted with Europeans. Trade was an area that Māori expected to control. From first contact, they had sold or exchanged fresh foodstuffs initially for high-value goods such as axes and later for money. George Grey was keen to encourage Māori trade and commerce and established new laws to empower them in 1846. Māori brought numerous cases under this legislation and won. This was their first and most successful legal experience. Māori had begun to include European concepts into their own cultural behaviour. In 1886 banknotes were printed (but not issued) by Te Peeke o Aotearoa, a bank established by Tāwhiao the Māori King. The text on these notes was Māori and there was also a picture of a flax bush. The bank's cheques had Māori figures and native birds and plants drawn on them.

=== Land negotiations ===
The Māori relationship with the land is complex. Traditionally the resources the land held were controlled based on systems of mana (power) and whakapapa (ancestral right). The land itself was both sacred and abstract. In many cases multiple groups would express a connection with the same important river or mountain. Oral tradition would record the migrations of groups from one area to another and their connection with an ancestral location.

In the early 19th century many Europeans entered into dealings with Māori to obtain land for their use. In some cases settlers thought they were buying land to obtain equivalent to freehold title under British law; Māori claimed that the various deeds signed by Māori were more limited and conditional, stopping short of outright alienation. It has been argued that the use of the word tuku in deeds, meaning to let or allow or give freely, was not the same as selling. This and other interpretations of early 19th century New Zealand land deals have been the source of much disagreement both within the Waitangi Tribunal process and outside it.

Māori, especially after 1830, were eager to have Europeans living on their land under their protection so they could benefit from European knowledge and trade. Missionaries on the other hand were keen to buy land so they could grow their own food to make them less dependent on tribal "protectors", who sometimes used food supplies to coerce them. Settlers allowed Māori to stay on the land they had "bought" and often continued to give presents to tribal chiefs, often prompted by the chiefs themselves, in order to maintain friendly relationships. These compromises stopped with the signing of the Treaty of Waitangi.

Another reason for Māori to "sell" land to missionaries was to protect the title of the land from other tribal competitors. Māori who had converted to Christianity wanted to protect their land without resorting to warfare. Some degree of control passed to the missionaries who Māori trusted to allow them continued access and use.

From 1840 generally, older chiefs were reluctant to sell while younger chiefs were in favour. The situation was complicated as Māori often had overlapping rights on poorly defined land. The settlers and the government also had very limited access to trained surveyors and even freehold land boundaries were ill-defined. Surveying was a relatively new skill and involved much hard physical work especially in hill country. New farmers were able to purchase a small freehold farm from Māori on which they established their homestead and farm buildings. They then entered into leases with Māori owners for much larger areas of land. Short-term leases gave Māori a powerful position as there was a large demand for grazing land.

The Native Lands Act was a policy enforced by the government in 1865, which allowed the Māori people to obtain individual titles for their land to sell. This act abolished the traditional shared landholdings and made it easier for European settlers to directly purchase land for themselves.

From the late 1840s some Māori tribes felt that the crown was not fulfilling its obligations under the Treaty of Waitangi or individual land deals. These claims against the government were to become a major feature of iwi politics. Each generation of leaders were judged based on their ability to progress a land claim.

== Leadership and politics ==
=== Māori kingship ===
From the time of their arrival in New Zealand, Māori lived in tribes that each functioned independently under the leadership of their own chiefs. However, by the 1850s Māori were faced with increasing numbers of British settlers, political marginalisation and growing demand from the Crown to purchase their lands. From about 1853 Māori began reviving the ancient tribal runanga or chiefly war councils where land issues were raised and in May 1854 a large meeting – attracting as many as 2000 Māori leaders – was held at Manawapou in south Taranaki where speakers urged concerted opposition to selling land. Inspired by a trip to England during which he had met Queen Victoria, Te Rauparaha's son Tāmihana Te Rauparaha used the rūnanga to promote the idea of forming a Māori kingdom, with one king ruling over all tribes. The kotahitanga or unity movement was aimed at bringing to Māori the unity that was an obvious strength among the Europeans. It was believed that by having a monarch who could claim status similar to that of Queen Victoria, Māori would be able to deal with Pākehā (Europeans) on equal footing. It was also intended to establish a system of law and order in Māori communities to which the Auckland government had so far shown little interest.

Several North Island candidates who were asked to put themselves forward declined the kingship. In February 1857 Wiremu Tamihana, a chief of the Ngāti Hauā iwi in the eastern Waikato, proposed the elderly and high-ranking Waikato chief Te Wherowhero as an ideal monarch. Initially reluctant, he was crowned at Ngāruawāhia in June 1858, and later adopted the name Pōtatau Te Wherowhero, or simply Pōtatau. Though there was widespread respect for the movement's efforts in establishing a "land league" to slow land sales, Pōtatau's role was strongly embraced only by Waikato Māori, with iwi of North Auckland and south of Waikato showing him scant recognition. Over time the King movement came to have a flag, a council of state, a code of laws, a "King's Resident Magistrate", police, a bank, a surveyor and a newspaper, Te Hokioi, all of which gave the movement the appearance of an alternative government.

Pōtatau was succeeded at his death in 1860 by Matutaera Tāwhiao, whose 34-year reign coincided with the military invasion of the Waikato, which was partly aimed at crushing the Kingitanga movement, with the government viewing it as a challenge to the supremacy of the British monarchy. Six Māori monarchs have subsequently held the throne, including the current queen, Nga wai hono i te po. Historic traditions such as the poukai (annual visits by the monarch to marae) and the koroneihana (coronation celebrations) continue.

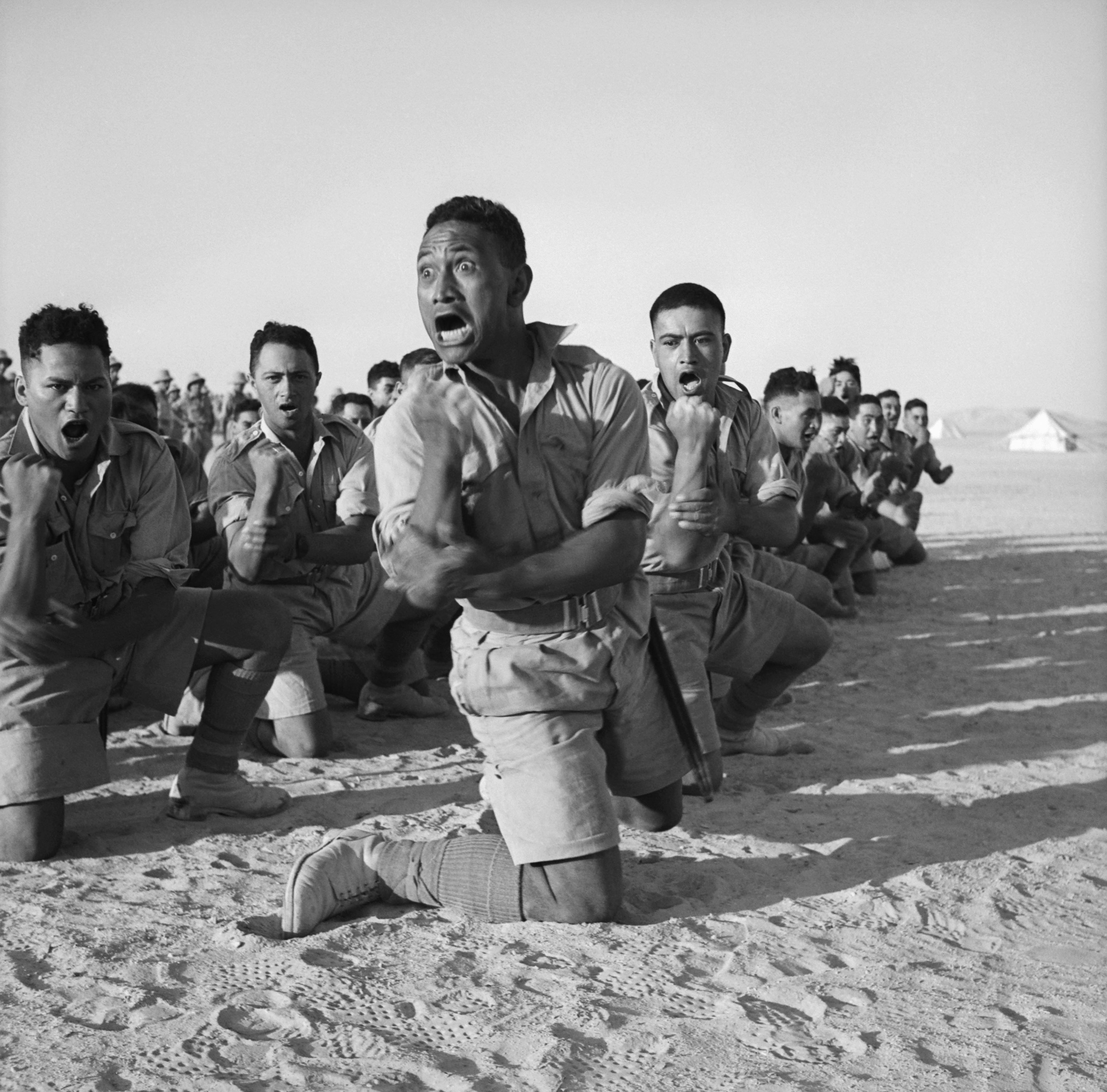
The Māori Battalion in North Africa (1941), the most well known example of the consistent Māori involvement in New Zealand's military

Today, the Māori monarch is a non-constitutional role with no legal power from the perspective of the New Zealand government. Reigning monarchs retain the position of paramount chief of several important tribes and wield some power over these, especially within Tainui.

== Warfare ==
From the Classic period warfare was an important part of Māori culture. This continued through the contact period and was expressed during the 20th century by large groups of volunteers in the First and Second world wars. Currently Māori men are over-represented in the New Zealand Army, Navy and private military organisations. New Zealand's army is identified as its own tribe, Ngāti Tūmatauenga (Tribe of the War God).

== Gender identity and roles ==
=== Women’s gender identity ===
Women have roles that help mediate between tapu and noa, resulting in strong connections between life and death. This can be represented by women helping with pregnancies and childbirth, as well as being kaikaranga who call to mourners before tangihanga. These roles are perceived as better suited for women rather than men due to their spiritual connection. Women participated in many male dominant duties, such as healers and religious leaders, although not everyone supported it. This varies across different iwi. In recent times, diversity of roles among men and women is more equal. Nevertheless, many believe that pre-colonial Māori society did not have set roles based on gender. Instead, people worked as a group to carry out tasks, such as gathering food. When European men interacted with Māori people, they found that women have high status roles and everyone contributed to their society.

=== Men’s gender identity ===
Men’s identity is formed through affiliation with others, heritage, and their own wellbeing. Whakapapa connects Māori to their ancestors, land, and spiritual world. For many Māori men there is a strong focus on heritage in relation to their geographic location. For example, their identities are stronger when they are living where their ancestors lived and raising children that will grow strong alongside their ancestors. While many believe that Māori women could step into roles typically of men, it is not certain that men could step into traditional women's roles. Regardless, Māori men often helped out with parenting and caring for their children. Many men have stronger identities based on being good parents and having respectful children. Māori believe that human life is based on the connections and situations with others rather than looking on their own which influences their identities. Men with or without leadership positions believe part of their identity as men is based on respecting their elders to have mana (power and authority) and to keep the community strong.

=== European influence on gender identity and roles ===
In the1800s, European missionaries spread Christianity throughout New Zealand, including Christian patriarchal attitudes. Tapu and noa were combined with Christian ideas in order to show women as sinful and destructive. One example of this is menstruation - once seen as tapu, Christian influence considered it negative and unclean. Women’s roles in society changed, giving them less power.

Māori men living among Pākehā after colonisation struggle with issues of stereotypes and gender identity. Their masculinity can be perceived as aggressive influencing how they were seen by others, being stereotyped and making opportunities more difficult. Although many Māori men involved in domestic violence and other crimes, they are involved no more so than pākehā. Many Māori men struggle with being seen this way by society and the police, so they act passive to combat this, losing their own identities in fear of being profiled and targeted.

== See also ==
- List of Māori composers
- New Zealand Māori actors
- Rangi and Papa
- Taha Māori

== Bibliography ==
- Belgrave, Michael (2013). Historical Frictions: Maori Claims and Reinvented Histories. Auckland University Press. ISBN 978-1-86940-595-3.
- Buck, Sir Peter (Te Rangi Hīroa) (1950). The Coming of the Maori (2nd ed.). Wellington: Māori Purposes Fund Board.
- Dalton, B. J. (1967). War and Politics in New Zealand 1855–1870. Sydney: Sydney University Press.
- King, Michael (2001). Nga Iwi O Te Motu: 1000 Years of Maori History. Auckland: Reed Publishing.
- King, Michael (2003). The Penguin History of New Zealand. New Zealand: Penguin Books. ISBN 0-14-301867-1.
- Mead, S. M. (1969). Traditional Maori Clothing. Wellington: A. H. & A. W. Reed.
- Mol, Hans (1981). The Fixed and the Fickle: Religion and Identity in New Zealand. Waterloo: Wilfrid Laurier University Press.
- Moon, Paul (2012). A Savage Country: The Untold Story of New Zealand in the 1820s. New Zealand: Penguin Books. ISBN 978-0-14356-738-7.
- Moon, Paul (2014). The Voyagers: Remarkable European Explorations of New Zealand. New Zealand: Penguin Random House New Zealand. ISBN 978-1-74253-940-9.
- O'Malley, Vincent (2012). The Meeting Place: Māori and Pākehā Encounters: 1642–1840. Auckland, New Zealand: Auckland University Press. ISBN 978-1-86940-594-6.
- Salmond, Anne (1991). Two worlds: first meetings between Maori and Europeans, 1642–1772. Auckland: Viking.
