= Tapuwae =

Tapuwae (Māori for "footprints") may refer to:

- Tapuwae Poharutanga o Tukutuku, an ancestor of Ngāti Kahungunu
- Tapuwae River in Northland, New Zealand
- Te Tapuwae o Rongokako Marine Reserve at Whangara, New Zealand
- Tapu ae, a traditional Māori ball game
