= Tekoteko =

Māori-language term for a carved human form

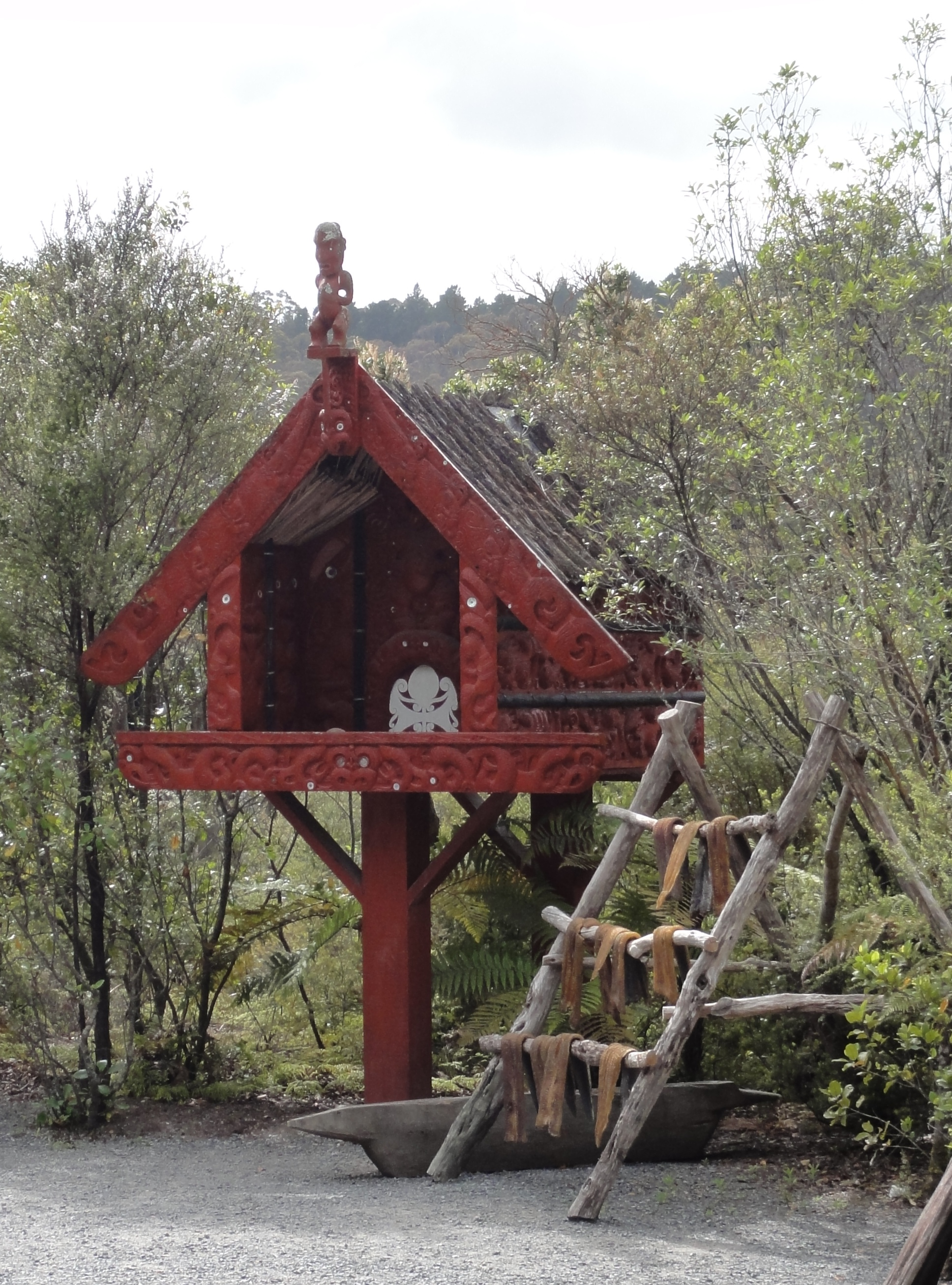
A pātaka with a tekoteko on top

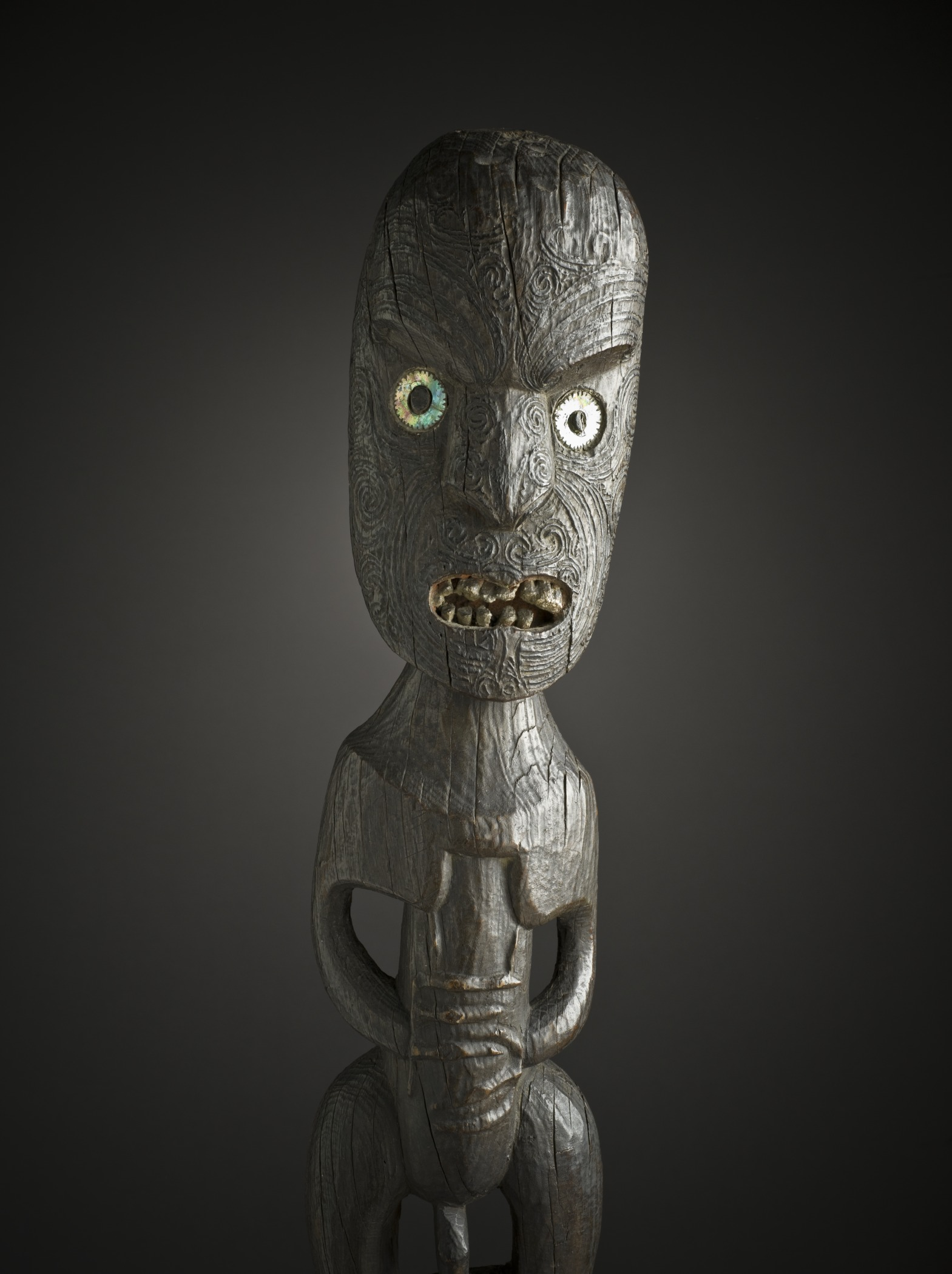
A tekoteko dating from around 1800 held at LACMA

A tekoteko is a Māori carved human figure that is mounted as a finial, usually above the gable of a Māori building, most commonly a wharenui (meeting house) or a pātaka (food storehouse). It usually stands above the koruru, a carved head mounted where the bargeboards meet at the apex of the gable. The tekoteko is carved as the embodiment of the one who takes a tree as material for their house and owns said house, as all things in the environment were believed as related to mankind from the union of Ranginui and Papatūānuku.

The word tekoteko has also been used of freestanding carvings of human figures.
