= Tapu ae =

Māori ball game

Tapu ae (also known as Tapuwai and Tapuwae) is a traditional Māori ball game. It is an adaptation of Kī-o-rahi to a court game, and was formalised about 1900. Today it is played on a hard surface such as a netball or basketball court. The court consists of two sides where players pass the ball to each other, aiming to knock the wooden block in the middle of the circle on each of the two sides over. There are different types of Tapu ae, which range from using the formally known wooden block as a defense, and the other using cones with tennis balls. It is widely known throughout the country of New Zealand.
