= Kī-o-rahi =

Ball sport in New Zealand

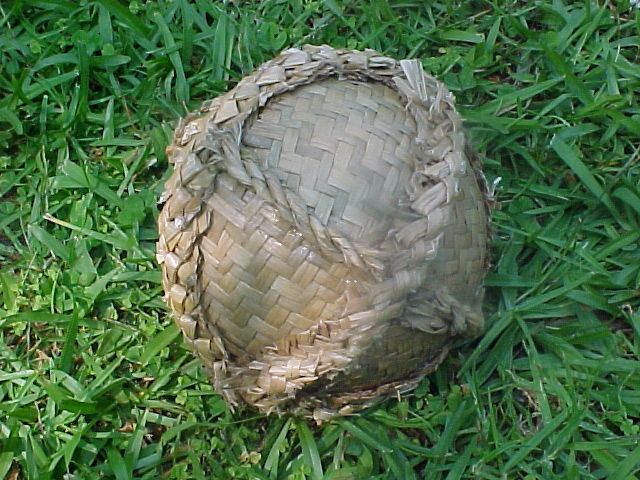
A traditional kī-o-rahi ball.

Kī-o-rahi is a ball sport played in New Zealand with a small round ball called a 'kī'. It is a fast-paced game incorporating skills similar to rugby union, netball, tag rugby and touch. Two teams of eight players play on a circular field divided into zones, and score points by touching the 'pou' (boundary markers) and hitting a central 'tupu' or target. The game is played with varying rules (e.g. number of people, size of field, tag ripping rules etc.) depending on the geographic area it is played in. A process called Tatu, before the game, determines which rules the two teams will use.

In 2005 kī-o-rahi was chosen to represent New Zealand by global fast-food chain McDonald's as part of its 'Passport to Play' programme to teach physical play activities in 31,000 American schools. The programme will give instruction in 15 ethnic games to seven million primary school children.

The New Zealand kī-o-rahi representative organisation, Kī-o-Rahi Akotanga Iho, formed with men's and women's national teams, completed a 14 match tour of Europe in September and October 2010. The men's team included 22-test All Black veteran Buck Shelford who led the team to a 57–10 test win against Kī-o-Rahi Dieppe Organisation, the French Kī-o-Rahi federation. Shelford's kī-o-rahi test jersey made him the first kī-o-rahi/rugby double international for New Zealand. The women's team coached by Andrea Cameron, head of PE at Tikipunga High School, also won by 33–0. These were the first historic test matches between New Zealand and France.

== Origins ==
Although former chief executive of the Māori Language Commission, Patu Hohepa, a Māori academic, was quoted as saying "We cannot track it in the traditional Maori world... at this present time it is a mystery." Nonetheless he found the idea (that this was a traditional game) "fabulously exciting". According to Henry Anderson, kaiwhakahaere (Māori sport co-ordinator) for Sport Northland, kī-o-rahi is a traditional Māori game that has been "handed down over the centuries". Harko Brown, a physical education teacher at Kerikeri High School, who was taught the game in the late 1970s on his marae in the south Waikato, described it as "an indigenous game imbued with tikanga Māori with a very long history ... of a pre-European nature." References to the ancient forms of the game can be found in his book Nga Taonga Takaro. It is not clear when the term 'kī-o-rahi' originated as a collective term for ancient ball games played around a tupu.

It is said to be based on the legend of Rahitutakahina and the rescue of his wife, Tiarakurapakewai.
