= Māori identity =

Māori identity is the objective or subjective state of perceiving oneself as a Māori person and as relating to being Māori (Māoriness). The most commonly cited central pillar of Māori identity is whakapapa (genealogy), which in its most literal sense requires blood-ancestry to Māori people.

== Overview ==
Witi Ihimaera, the first published Māori novelist, has described its connection as follows: "For many Maori, the key to their cultural or ethnic identity as Maori lies in whakapapa, that mystical element that forever links Maori, through their tipuna, to this land". Alternatively, Peeni Henare has criticised blood quantum factors in relation to Māori identity, suggesting it is an attack on the identity of urban Māori and non-Māori-speakers.

Colloquially, Taha Māori (the Māori perspective) is used closely in association with the identity of Māori people. Māori identity can be defined independently of religious identity; Māori are a diverse group in terms of religious affiliations, including Māori Christians and Māori Muslims, as well as followers of the traditional Māori belief system. In Māori mythology, the indigenous faith carried largely unchanged to Aotearoa from the tropical Eastern Polynesian homeland Hawaiki Nui. Tangihanga (mourning ceremonies) or native funeral rituals, as well as tangata whenua (people of the land) are both strongly linked with the concept of Māori identity.

Local government in the Auckland Region actively promotes its growth, stating that "Using Māori names for roads, buildings and other public places is an opportunity to publicly demonstrate Māori identity". Auckland Council have also stated that both kaumātua and kuia (male and female tribal elders) are crucial to the "matauranga and tikanga that underpins Māori identity".

== Categories ==
Māori identity can be described as consisting of interconnected parts, some or all of which may constitute an individual's self-identification:

1. Māori peoplehood, a Polynesian indigenous ethnic identity, identified most readily via whakapapa
2. Māori religion, the observance or recognition of the Māori belief system
3. Māori culture, celebration of Māoritanga and traditions

== Academic research ==
Academic research examining Māori cultural and racial identity has been conducted since the 1990s. The 1994 study by Mason Durie (Te Hoe Nuku Roa Framework: A Maori Identity Measure), Massey University's 2004 study of Maori cultural identity, and 2010's Multi-dimensional model of Māori identity and cultural engagement by Chris Sibley and Carla Houkamau have explored the concept in various ways. 2015's Perspectives towards Māori identity by Māori heritage language learners, conducted at Victoria University of Wellington, acknowledges that "Māori identities continue to evolve and adapt as a result of social and environmental changes Māori experience". In 2019, the University of Auckland conducted the Māori Identity and Financial Attitudes Study2.

== Community work and investment ==
Community work in New Zealand has identified males struggling with their Māori identity, often also living by Māori lunar calendar, as a significant suicide risk. In 2015, The Guardian covered a crisis of Māori incarceration and identity in relation to the New Zealand prison system. Toby Manhire reported:

While those who identify as Māori make up about 15% of the New Zealand population, the corresponding figure behind bars is more than 50%. Among women, for whom there is no Te Tirohanga option, it is higher still, at 60%.

In 2019, The Northland Age reported on the merits of a noho-marae style of counselling to incarcerated Māori, utilising tikanga (traditional rules for conducting life) in a "course that uses Māori philosophy, values, knowledge and practices to foster the regeneration of Māori identity". In 2019, in a Radio New Zealand budget summary, the announcement of an NZ$80 million investment in Whānau Ora, including a Māori suicide prevention initiative, "as well as eight programmes to strengthen Māori identity".

== See also ==
- Cultural identity
- Ethnic identity development
- Ethnogenesis
- Group identity
- Identity (social science)
- Identity formation
- Identity politics
- Māori electorates
- Māori nationalism
- Māori renaissance
- National identity
- Self-concept
- Social identity
