= Carla Houkamau =

New Zealand psychology professor

- Born: Carla Anne Houkamau
- Citizenship: New Zealand

Academic background
- Education: University of Auckland, Waiariki Institute of Technology
- Thesis: Identity and socio-historical context: transformations and change among Māori women (2006)
- Doctoral advisor: Niki Harré, Tim McCreanor

Carla Anne Houkamau is a New Zealand social psychologist and a full professor at the University of Auckland, specialising in Māori identity, Māori business, the Māori economy, and Māori commercial fisheries.

== Academic career ==
Houkamau is Māori, and is of Ngāti Porou, Ngāti Kahungunu, Ngāi Tahu and Pākehā descent.

Houkamau completed a Bachelor of Commerce degree, followed by an Honours degree in Psychology, and a PhD in social psychology titled Identity and socio-historical context: transformations and change among Māori women, all at the University of Auckland. She also holds a Diploma in Journalism from Waiariki Institute of Technology. Houkamau completed postdoctoral research and then joined the faculty of the University of Auckland, before moving to a lectureship at the Eastern Institute of Technology in 2007. After two years she moved back to the University of Auckland, rising to full professor. Houkamau was Director of the Dame Mira Szászy Research Centre for Māori and Pacific Economic Development, and has held Associate Dean Māori and Academic Director positions within the Auckland business school, and as of 2026 is the Interim Dean of the school.

Houkamau is interested in the history of relations between Māori and Pākeha, intergroup relations, how social relations affect inequality, and cultural understanding. Houkamau developed an internationally recognised model for ethnic identity research, the Multidimensional Model of Māori identity and Cultural Engagement. She leads a Marsden grant-funded project, Te Rangahau o Te Tuakiri Māori me Ngā Waiaro ā-Pūtea The Māori Identity and Financial Attitudes Study, which is a national longitudinal study of Māori attitudes towards identity and financial behaviour. In 2012 Houkamau was awarded the Business School Early Career Research Excellence Award, and as part of the New Zealand Attitudes and Values Study team, won the University of Auckland Group Excellence Award in 2017. Houkamau also won the Auckland University Business School Research Excellence Award in 2021.

In 2025, with Dr. Robert Pouwhare, Carla Houkamau wrote Mana Moana: Ngā Urungi o Te Ohu Kaimoana Toitū mō Anamata (Navigators of Sustainable Fisheries for the Future), which chronicles the history of Māori commercial fisheries, connecting ancient Polynesian traditions to modern, ethical business practices in New Zealand's largest all-Māori-owned fisheries business, Moana New Zealand. She has also published on Māori perspectives of capitalism, Māori self-employment, and Māori values in business.

== Selected works ==
- Sibley, Chris G.; Greaves, Lara; Nicole Satherley; Wilson, Marc; Overall, Nickola Christine; Carol H J Lee; Petar Milojev; Bulbulia, Joseph; Danny Osborne; Milfont, Taciano; Carla Houkamau; Isabelle M Duck; Raine Vickers-Jones; Fiona K. Barlow (2020). "Effects of the COVID-19 pandemic and nationwide lockdown on trust, attitudes toward government, and well-being". American Psychologist. doi:10.1037/amp0000662. PMID 32496074. Wikidata Q96115786.
- Sibley, Chris G.; Carla A Houkamau (2013). "The multi-dimensional model of Māori identity and cultural engagement: item response theory analysis of scale properties" (PDF). Cultural Diversity and Ethnic Minority Psychology. 19 (1): 97–110. doi:10.1037/a0031113. PMID 23356361. Wikidata Q47790811.
- Carla A. Houkamau; Sibley, Chris G. (2010). "Māori Cultural Efficacy and Subjective Wellbeing: A Psychological Model and Research Agenda". Social Indicators Research. 103 (3): 379–398. doi:10.1007/s11205-010-9705-5. Wikidata Q60242009.
- Carla A Houkamau; Sibley, Chris G. (2015). "Looking Māori predicts decreased rates of home ownership: institutional racism in housing based on perceived appearance". PLOS One. 10 (3) e0118540. Bibcode:2015PLoSO..1018540H. doi:10.1371/journal.pone.0118540. PMC 4349451. PMID 25738961. Wikidata Q34465656.
- Carla A. Houkamau; Samantha Stronge; Sibley, Chris G. (2017). "The Prevalence and Impact of Racism Toward Indigenous Māori in New Zealand". International Perspectives in Psychology: Research. 6 (2): 61–80. doi:10.1037/ipp0000070. Wikidata Q127162514.
- Samantha Stronge; Nikhil K Sengupta; Barlow, Fiona; Danny Osborne; Carla A Houkamau; Sibley, Chris G. (2015). "Perceived discrimination predicts increased support for political rights and life satisfaction mediated by ethnic identity: A longitudinal analysis". Cultural Diversity and Ethnic Minority Psychology. 22 (3): 359–368. doi:10.1037/cdp0000074. PMID 26460667. Wikidata Q40438980.
- Carla Anne Houkamau (2010). "Identity construction and reconstruction: the role of socio-historical contexts in shaping Māori women's identity". Social Identities. 16 (2): 179–196. doi:10.1080/13504631003688872. Wikidata Q127162515.
