= Multi-dimensional model of Maori identity and cultural engagement =

Questionnaire designed to assess and evaluate Māori identity in New Zealand

The multi-dimensional model of Māori identity and cultural engagement (MMM-ICE) is a self-report (Likert-type) questionnaire designed to assess and evaluate Māori identity in seven distinct dimensions of identity and cultural engagement in Māori populations: group-membership evaluation, socio-political consciousness, cultural efficacy and active identity engagement, spirituality, interdependent self-concept, authenticity of beliefs, and perceived appearance.

The MMM-ICE is a quantitative index of identity that can be readily compared across independent studies of the Māori people. The index was developed by Drs Carla Houkamau and Chris Sibley in 2010; both of whom are senior lecturers at The University of Auckland. The scale was updated in 2014 as the MMM-ICE2 to incorporate the seventh measure of perceived appearance. The MMM-ICE2 aims to provide a culturally sensitive, valid, and reliable measure of Māori identity: "who" a person is as Māori, how they "fit in" with others socially, and what that means in terms of behaviour. The MMM-ICE is associated with the New Zealand Attitudes and Values Study.

== Dimensions ==
=== Group membership evaluation ===
Group membership evaluation reflects the basic premise of social identity theory that individuals strive for favourable evaluations of their group. The more positively one's group is perceived, the greater the positive evaluations individuals can draw from when interpreting themselves. Having a negative sense of self as Māori has group members internalise the negative evaluations into their own self-concept. Since social identities are not only descriptive but also evaluative, the position of one's group within social hierarchy is viewed as central to the self-experience of individual members.

Sample items in this dimension include:

- I reckon being Māori is awesome.
- I love the fact that I am Māori.
- My Māori ancestry is important to me.
- I don't really care about following Māori culture. (reverse coded)
- I wish I could hide the fact that I am Māori from other people. (reverse coded)
- Being Māori is not important to who I am as a person. (reverse coded)

=== Socio-political consciousness ===
Socio-political consciousness reflects how active an individual is in promoting and defending Māori rights given the context of the Treaty of Waitangi.

Issues include support for (or lack thereof) a Māori political party, resource allocation and reparation for the Māori based on historical injustice, and issues relating to the symbolic representation of Māori culture. A high score on this scale reflects the belief that Māori individuals need to remain loyal to the group and stay politically unified. For example, individuals who score high on this scale are more supportive of the Māori Party (a political party in New Zealand that represents the Māori), and least supportive of the New Zealand National Party (the mainstream centre-right political party currently in power). A low score on this scale reflects the belief that Māori people should operate independently and that Māori–Pākehā (non-Māori New Zealanders) historical relations are irrelevant for understanding contemporary ways of "being" Māori. Those who score low on this scale will generally endorse the dominant ideological positions, political attitudes, and intergroup attitudes of white New Zealanders.

Sample items include:

- I stand up for Māori rights.
- It's important for Māori to stand together and be strong if we want to claim back the lands that were taken from us.
- All of us, both Māori and Pākehā, did bad things in the past – we should all just forget about it. (reverse coded)
- I'm sick of hearing about the Treaty of Waitangi and how Māori had their land stolen. (reverse coded)
- I think we should all just be New Zealanders and forget about differences between Māori and Pākehā. (reverse coded)
- What the European settlers did to Māori in the past has nothing to do with me personally. I wasn't there and I don't think it affects me at all. (reverse coded)

=== Cultural efficacy and active identity engagement ===
Cultural efficacy and active identity engagement measures the extent to which the individual perceives they have the personal resources required to engage appropriately with other Māori in Māori social and cultural contexts. These personal resources include the ability to speak and understand Te Reo Māori, knowledge of Tikanga Māori and Marae etiquette, and the ability to articulate heritage confidently (e.g., recite whakapapa).

A high score on this scale would reflect that an individual is comfortable and feels accepted when among other Māori or in situations which require the active expression of Māori traditional knowledge (such as participating in pōwhiri and tangihanga).

Sample items include:

- I know how to act the right way when I am on a marae.
- I'm comfortable doing Māori cultural stuff when I need to.
- I try to korero (speak) Māori whenever I can.
- I don't know how to act like a real Māori on a marae. (reverse coded)
- I can't do Māori culture or speak Māori. (reverse coded)
- I sometimes feel that I don't fit in with other Māori. (reverse coded)

=== Spirituality ===
Spirituality measures engagement with, and belief in, certain Māori spiritual concepts. This relates primarily to feeling a strong connection with ancestors, Māori traditions, the sensation and experience of waahi tapu (sacred places), and a strong spiritual attachment and feeling of connectedness with the land.

Sample items include:

- I believe that Tupuna (ancient ancestors) can communicate with you if they want to.
- I believe that my Taha Wairua (my spiritual side) is an important part of my Māori identity.
- I can sense it when I am in a Tapu place.
- I can sometimes feel my Māori ancestors watching over me.
- I don't believe that Māori spiritual stuff. (reverse coded)
- I have never felt a spiritual connection with my ancestors. (reverse coded)
- I think Tapu is just a made-up thing. It can't really affect you. (reverse coded)

=== Interdependent self-concept ===
Interdependent self-concept measures the extent to which the concept of the self-as-Māori is defined by virtue of relationships with other Māori people, rather than being defined solely as a unique and independent individual. Māori are more likely to experience self-conceptualization in terms of important relationships. This is manifested by a tendency for individuals to see their identity as inherently linked to relationships with others. The MMM-ICE interdependent self-concept scale also relates to the concept of the independent versus interdependent self that has emerged in cross-cultural psychology. This link suggests that the concept of self for many Māori people may be inherently linked or embedded in a collective identity.

Sample items include:

- My relationships with other Māori people (friends and family) are what make me Māori.
- I consider myself Māori because I am interconnected with other Māori people, including friends and family.
- My Māori identity is fundamentally about my relationships with other Māori.
- My Māori identity belongs to me personally. It has nothing to do with my relationships with other Māori. (reverse coded)

=== Authenticity beliefs ===
Authenticity beliefs measures the extent to which the individual believes that to be a "real" Māori, one must display specific (stereotypical) features, knowledge, and behaviour, as opposed to the belief that Māori identity is fluid rather than fixed and is produced through experience.

A high score on this scale therefore represents a rigid and inflexible construction of the characteristics that determine an "authentic" Māori identity. This relates to various (often Pākehā-constructed) definitions of Māori "race", such as blood quantum or appearance.

Sample items include:

- You can always tell true Māori from other Māori. They're real different.
- I reckon that true Māori hang out at their marae all the time.
- True Māori always do a karakia (prayer) before important events.
- Real Māori put their whanau first.
- To be truly Māori you need to understand your whakapapa and the history of your people.
- You can be a real Māori even if you don't know your Iwi. (reverse coded)
- You can be a true Māori without ever speaking Māori. (reverse coded)

=== Perceived appearance ===
Perceived appearance measures the extent to which people subjectively evaluate their physical appearance as exhibiting features that signals their ethnicity as Māori.

Sample items include:

- I think it is clear to other people when they look at me that I am of Māori descent.
- When people meet me, they often do not realise that I am Māori. (reverse coded)
- People who don't know me often assume that I am from another (non-Māori) ethnic group. (reverse coded)

== Research using the MMM-ICE ==
Houkamau and Sibley proposed the MMM-ICE be used as an instrument for answering the question, "What does 'being Māori' mean?"

In 2014, they examined how those who identified solely as Māori versus those who identified partially differed in terms of a range of psychological and economic outcomes. They found that those who identified as having mixed Māori and European ancestry reported significantly higher satisfaction with their standard of living, personal health, future security, and the economic situation in New Zealand. Identifying with a mixed ancestry was also associated with having political views closer to those of white New Zealanders, such as supporting the New Zealand National Party. Those who identified solely as Māori showed increased support for the Māori Party, and were more supportive of bicultural policies.

In 2015, Houkamau and Sibley found that self-reported measures of one's appearance as Māori significantly predicted decreased rates of home ownership. This effect held even when adjusting for numerous demographic covariates.
