= Tangata whenua =

Māori term

Tangata whenua (Māori pronunciation: [ˈtaŋata ˈfɛnʉ.a]) is a New Zealand Māori term that translates to 'people of the land'. It can refer to either a specific group of people with historical claims to a district, or more broadly, the Māori people whose ancestors have occupied the land for so many generations that they are considered to have become part of the land.

== Etymology ==
According to Williams's definitive Dictionary of the Māori Language, tangata means 'man', whilst tāngata (with the macronised "ā") is the plural, and means 'people'. Tangata—without the macron—can also mean 'people' in reference to a group with a singular identity.

Whenua means both 'land' and 'placenta' (again referencing Williams, who lists five definitions). It is an ancient Austronesian word with cognates across the Malayo-Polynesian world, from Malay benua (now meaning 'continent'), Visayan *banwa and to Rapa Nui henua; ultimately from Proto-Austronesian *banua. Unlike European thought, wherein people own land, in the Māori worldview the land is regarded as a mother to the people. The relationship to the land is not dissimilar to that of the foetus to the placenta. In addition, there are certain Māori rituals involving burying the afterbirth of a newborn in the ancestral land, which may further illustrate the word whenua meaning both 'land' and 'placenta'.

== Contexts ==
- In the context of tribal descent and ownership of land, tangata whenua are the people who descend from the first people to settle the land of the district; the mana may reside with later arrivals.
- At a particular marae, the tangata whenua are the owners of the marae, in contradistinction to the manuhiri ('guests'). After the welcoming ceremony on a marae, the guests may be afforded the temporary, honorary status of tangata whenua, and may even be invited to participate as locals as the ceremonies continue.
- Tangata whenua has also become a New Zealand English term with specific legal status.

== Law and custom ==
In Māori culture, Māori people may be divided into three levels of kinship, on which traditional governance was based.

=== Whānau ===
The smallest level, whānau, is what is now considered the extended family of the Māori, descended from a common great-grandparent. Traditionally a whānau would hold in common their food store (their forest or bush for hunting birds and gathering or growing plant foods, and a part of the sea, a river or a lake for gathering eels, fish, shellfish, and other seafood). These food stores were fiercely protected: when one's resources could no longer support a growing whānau, war with a neighbouring tribe might eventuate.

=== Hapū ===
The next level, hapū ('sub-tribe'), is a group of several related whānau, and was traditionally the primary governance unit. In war, and when decisions needed to be made in negotiations with outside tribes, whānau leaders would gather and the hapū would make collective decisions.

=== Iwi ===
Several (or many) hapū can trace their ancestry, usually on the male line, back to a particular waka, the ocean-going canoe upon which the common ancestors of that tribe arrived in New Zealand, and this unified level is called the iwi. Until the British arrived, the iwi was not a governance unit; instead, it was called a Wakameninga. An example of this is in He Whakaputanga Declaration of Independence 1835 with the Ngā Puhi Whakaminenga of Rangatira signing a contract with King George as protector of Niu Tireni, at that time Ngā Puhi Rohe. The Whakameninga is a spiritual union between Io Matua Kore, the Supreme Creator, and the Hapū Rangatira with no third-party interference. Attendance was voluntary; depending on the issue, hapū could voice their non-consent by choosing not to send their Rangatira. An iwi is a New Zealand Government–controlled Statutory Trust.

However, under British and subsequent New Zealand law, the hapū and Whakameninga were replaced by Crown intermediary agencies called iwi. These were formed by statute so settlements could be negotiated between tangata whenua and statutory Crown entities. Under the Treaty of Waitangi, these statutory entities are accorded Treaty rights and obligations under New Zealand law; when recognised as Māori, they are defined as "Tangata Whenua" within the legislative framework.

Iwi trusts under the New Zealand Government authority co-ordinate Statutory Hapū Trusts that have to provide a provable relationship with a specific area of geography in unbroken occupation, and if this is acknowledged by the national or local authority, they become the legal tangata whenua under statutory authority. Some areas may have several Hapū with pre-existing rights as the tangata whenua, which can make the process more complex for non-Māori entities who are creating working relationships. Some of these Hapū have not signed settlements, which causes more complexity.

When, for example, a major real-estate development is proposed to the territorial authority, because of the potential desecration of burial sites which are very numerous over New Zealand's topography the tangata whenua must be consulted, although the mere fact that "consultation" takes place does not mean that the views of the tangata whenua will necessarily be listened to. When bones are found, the tangata whenua are supposed to be called. In addition to these sorts of legally mandated requirements, when a person wishes to have land blessed, or when a sudden death occurs, an elder (kaumātua or tohunga) of the tangata whenua may be asked to perform a cleansing ritual.

== Tangata tiriti ==
The notion of tangata whenua is sometimes contrasted with tangata tiriti—literally, 'the people of the treaty'.

Tangata tiriti refers to non-indigenous New Zealanders who are in the country by virtue of the Treaty of Waitangi - a category which some see as inadequate to describe more recent arrivals to New Zealand whose ancestors had nothing to do with the Treaty or its obligations.

Some see Tangata tiriti as close to (but not necessarily synonymous with) the term pākehā, the peoples who have arrived through the auspices of the monarchs of Great Britain and then of New Zealand.

As used notably by Judge Eddie Durie, the notion of tangata tiriti underlines partnership and acceptance.

== Mataawaka ==
Mataawaka or mātāwaka is a term for a kinship group, but has acquired a contrasting meaning referring to Māori people living in an area who are not part of a tangata whenua group.

== See also ==
- Resource Management Act 1991
