= Nickola Overall =

New Zealand professor of psychology

- Born: 1974 (age 51–52); Te Kūiti, New Zealand

Academic background
- Education: University of Canterbury
- Thesis: Why do people try to change their intimate relationships?: the regulation function of ideal standards (2005)
- Doctoral advisor: Garth J. O. Fletcher

Academic work
- Discipline: Psychology
- Institutions: University of Auckland

Nickola Christine Overall (born 1974) is a New Zealand academic, and is a professor of psychology at the University of Auckland, specialising in relationship, family and couples psychology. She is especially interested in communication strategies to overcome conflict.

== Early life and education ==
Overall was born in Te Kūiti in 1974 and completed a PhD titled Why do people try to change their intimate relationships?: the regulation function of ideal standards at the University of Canterbury, supervised by Garth Fletcher.

== Academic career ==
After completing her doctorate, Overall joined the faculty of the University of Auckland, rising to full professor.

Overall's research focuses on healthy relationships, and how to achieve them, or as she describes it, "I study why relationships screw us up and what we can do about it". This involves researching topics such as emotional regulation, attachment insecurity, attitudes to power, and sexist attitudes. She has also studied the effect of lockdowns on family relationships. Overall is especially interested in communication strategies used by couples in relationships to overcome conflict. Overall's research has found that most people in a relationship want to change something about their partner, but few have success in doing so and trying in the wrong way can negatively affect the relationship.

Overall was a principal investigator on a 2017 Marsden grant Conflict recovery in families: Why inevitable conflict does not have to be detrimental, in collaboration with Annette Henderson and Elizabeth Peterson. Overall has also received research funding from the Auckland Medical Research Foundation and the Maurice and Phyllis Paykel Trust.

Overall has served on the editorial boards of a number of journals, including the Journal of Personality and Social Psychology and Personality and Social Psychology Bulletin.

== Honours and awards ==
- Fellow of the Society of Personality and Social Psychology
- Fellow of the Association of Psychological Science
- 2016 Gerald R. Miller Award for Early Career Achievement from the International Association for Relationship Research
- 2014 Caryl Rusbult Close Relationships Early Career Award for outstanding contributions to relationship science, awarded by the Society for Personality and Social Psychology

== Selected works ==
- Sibley, Chris G.; Greaves, Lara; Nicole Satherley; Wilson, Marc; Overall, Nickola Christine; Carol H J Lee; Petar Milojev; Bulbulia, Joseph; Danny Osborne; Milfont, Taciano; Carla Houkamau; Isabelle M Duck; Raine Vickers-Jones; Fiona K. Barlow (2020). "Effects of the COVID-19 pandemic and nationwide lockdown on trust, attitudes toward government, and well-being". American Psychologist. doi:10.1037/amp0000662. PMID 32496074. Wikidata Q96115786.
- Paula R Pietromonaco; Overall, Nickola Christine (2020). "Applying relationship science to evaluate how the COVID-19 pandemic may impact couples' relationships". American Psychologist. doi:10.1037/amp0000714. PMID 32700937. Wikidata Q97676406.
- Fletcher, Garth Joseph Owen; Simpson, Jeffry; Campbell, Lorne; Overall, Nickola Christine (2015). "Pair-bonding, romantic love, and evolution: the curious case of Homo sapiens". Perspectives on Psychological Science. 10 (1): 20–36. doi:10.1177/1745691614561683. PMID 25910380. Wikidata Q38440723.
- Overall, Nickola Christine; Fletcher, Garth Joseph Owen; Myron D Friesen (2003). "Mapping the intimate relationship mind: comparisons between three models of attachment representations". Personality and Social Psychology Bulletin. 29 (12): 1479–1493. doi:10.1177/0146167203251519. PMID 15018680. Wikidata Q59486811.
- Fletcher, Garth Joseph Owen; Jacqueline M Tither; Claire O'Loughlin; Myron D Friesen; Overall, Nickola Christine (2004). "Warm and homely or cold and beautiful? Sex differences in trading off traits in mate selection". Personality and Social Psychology Bulletin. 30 (6): 659–672. doi:10.1177/0146167203262847. PMID 15155031. Wikidata Q53342259.
- Overall, Nickola Christine; Fletcher, Garth Joseph Owen; Simpson, Jeffry; Sibley, Chris G. (2009). "Regulating partners in intimate relationships: the costs and benefits of different communication strategies". Journal of Personality and Social Psychology. 96 (3): 620–639. doi:10.1037/a0012961. PMID 19254108. Wikidata Q48294461.
- Overall, Nickola Christine; Kelsey L. Deane; Peterson, Elizabeth Ruth (2011). "Promoting doctoral students' research self-efficacy: combining academic guidance with autonomy support". Higher Education Research and Development. 30 (6): 791–805. doi:10.1080/07294360.2010.535508. Wikidata Q125213708.
