= Annette Henderson =

Psychology professor in New Zealand

- Awards: Rutherford Discovery Fellowship

Academic background
- Education: Queen's University, University of Calgary
- Theses: Two-year-olds' appreciation of the conventionality of novel labels in indirect word learning contexts (2002); Conventionality and children's word learning (2007)

Annette Margaret Elizabeth Henderson is a New Zealand developmental psychologist, and is a full professor at the University of Auckland, specialising in the development of cooperation in children. She was awarded a Rutherford Discovery Fellowship and has been a principal investigator on two Marsden grants.

== Academic career ==
Henderson completed a Master of Science at the University of Calgary and a PhD titled Conventionality and children's word learning at Queen's University. Henderson completed postdoctoral research at the University of Maryland, before joining the faculty of the University of Auckland in 2009, rising to full professor in 2024. Henderson established and is the director of the Early Learning Laboratory at Auckland. Henderson was president of the Australasian Human Development Association from 2019, and served on the editorial board of the Journal of Cognition and Development.

Henderson was awarded a Rutherford Discovery Fellowship in 2015, to research the impact of culture and interactions with caregivers on the development of cooperation in young children, by comparing children in New Zealand and Vanuatu. Henderson has also been a principal investigator on two Marsden grants, a fast start grant in 2013 called Shaping cooperation: identifying how genes, experience, and socio-cognitive ability influence the development of cooperation in early childhood, with Donald Love, and a full grant in 2017 called Conflict recovery in families: Why inevitable conflict does not have to be detrimental, with Nickola Overall and Elizabeth Peterson.

Henderson featured as one of the psychologists on the TVNZ series Secret Life of Girls.

== Selected works ==
- Suzanne Hala; Stacey Hug; Henderson, Annette Margaret Elizabeth (2003). "Executive Function and False-Belief Understanding in Preschool Children: Two Tasks Are Harder Than One". Journal of Cognition and Development. 4 (3): 275–298. doi:10.1207/s15327647jcd0403_03. Wikidata Q125164342.
- Amanda L Woodward; Jessica A Sommerville; Gerson, Sarah; Henderson, Annette Margaret Elizabeth; Jennifer Buresh (2009). "The emergence of intention attribution in infancy". Psychology of Learning and Motivation: Advances in Research and Theory. 51: 187–222. doi:10.1016/s0079-7421(09)51006-7. PMC 3997181. PMID 24771952. Wikidata Q37719262.
- Howard, Lauren; Henderson, Annette Margaret Elizabeth; Cristina Carrazza; Amanda L Woodward (2014). "Infants' and young children's imitation of linguistic in-group and out-group informants". Child Development. 86 (1): 259–275. doi:10.1111/cdev.12299. PMC 4358791. PMID 25263528. Wikidata Q35174613.
- Henderson, Annette Margaret Elizabeth; Amanda L Woodward (2011). ""Let's work together": what do infants understand about collaborative goals?". Cognition. 121 (1): 12–21. doi:10.1016/j.cognition.2011.05.008. PMC 3163231. PMID 21722884. Wikidata Q35185069.
- Graham, Susan; Hayli Stock; Henderson, Annette Margaret Elizabeth (2006). "Nineteen-Month-Olds' Understanding of the Conventionality of Object Labels Versus Desires". Infancy. 9 (3): 341–350. doi:10.1207/s15327078in0903_5. PMID 33412676. Wikidata Q104792612.
- Suzanne Hala; Carmen Rasmussen; Henderson, Annette Margaret Elizabeth (2005). "Three types of source monitoring by children with and without autism: the role of executive function". Journal of Autism and Developmental Disorders. 35 (1): 75–89. doi:10.1007/s10803-004-1036-4. PMID 15796124. Wikidata Q50306516.
- Overall, Nickola Christine; Chang, Valerie T.; Paula R. Pietromonaco; Low, Rachel S. T.; Henderson, Annette Margaret Elizabeth (2021). "Partners' Attachment Insecurity and Stress Predict Poorer Relationship Functioning During COVID-19 Quarantines". Social Psychological and Personality Science. 13 (1): 285–298. doi:10.1177/1948550621992973. Wikidata Q125179032.
