= The Pacific Identity and Wellbeing Scale =

The Pacific Identity and Wellbeing Scale (PIWBS) is a self-report inventory with a Likert scale format, designed to assess five distinct dimensions of identity and subjective well-being among Pacific populations in New Zealand:

1. Group Membership Evaluation
2. Pacific Connectedness and Belonging
3. Religious Centrality and Embeddedness
4. Perceived Familial Wellbeing
5. Perceived Societal Wellbeing

The PIWBS was developed by Sam Manuela, a doctoral candidate at The University of Auckland. The scale aims to provide a culturally sensitive, valid and reliable self-report inventory of Pacific identity and subjective well-being which aids the understanding and predicting of Pacific outcomes. The measure contributes to Pacific studies by providing a quantitative, within-cultural research tool for Pacific peoples from a Pacific perspective. The PIWBS is associated with the New Zealand Attitudes and Values Study.

The dimensions, Group Membership Evaluation, Pacific Connectedness and Belonging, and Religious Centrality and Embeddness all relate to identity. Answers to questions relating to identity are rated on a Likert scale ranging from 1 to 7 (1 = strongly disagree and 7 = strongly agree). The dimensions, Perceived Familial Wellbeing and Perceived Societal Wellbeing both relate to wellbeing. Answers to questions relating to wellbeing are rated on a Likert scale ranging from 1 to 7 (1 = completely dissatisfied and 7 = completely satisfied).

== The Five Dimensions ==
=== 1. Group Membership Evaluation (GME) ===
This factor reflects subjective evaluations of membership within the Pacific group. Positive group evaluations are shown through pride in one's ethnic identity and culture, and represent a secure ethnic identity. This factor includes an evaluation of positive effect brought about by Pacific group membership, and an evaluation of the extent to which one's Pacific identity is seen as a central and defining aspect of self-concept. High scores on this factor would indicate that positive/worthwhile feelings are derived from Pacific identification, and that affiliation with a Pacific group is seen as a desirable aspect of self-concept and is central to identity.

==== Sample Group Membership Evaluation Items ====
- The fact that I am an Islander is an important part of my identity
- Being an Islander is an important part of how I see myself
- I am glad to be a Pacific Islander
- I am proud to be a Pacific Islander
- Being a Pacific Islander gives me a good feeling

==== 2. Pacific Connectedness and Belonging (PCB) ====
This factor is a measure of an individual's sense of belonging and connectedness with Pacific others and groups. These feelings derive from shared experiences and commonalities and are particularly apparent among youth. This factor, which assesses the extent to which the individual believes the self to be an integral part of a Pacific group, is made up of two distinct dimensions. The first dimension concerns perceived connections/relationships with others, and the second dimension concerns an individual's subjective sense of belonging at a broader level. High scores on this factor would indicate that the individual feels similar to Pacific others, and perceives themselves to be an integral member of the wider, general group, and have a feeling of belonging.

===== Sample Pacific Connectedness and Belonging Items =====
- I feel at home around other Islanders, even if they are not from my Island
- I feel comfortable in places with lots of other Pacific peoples
- I don’t get along with other island groups (reverse coded)
- I feel connected to other Pacific peoples in general
- I feel connected to people from a different Pacific Island to myself
- I feel most comfortable in Pacific communities

==== 3. Religious Centrality and Embeddedness (RCE) ====
This factor assesses the individual's evaluation of the extent to which religion is central to their identity as Pacific, and the extent to which they believe religion to be entwined with Pacific culture. Religion is an important aspect of Pacific identity, having a huge influence on many Pacific communities by providing social connections and support, and fulfilling cultural and religious needs. This factor focuses on Christianity-based religions which are the most common in Pacific societies. High scores on this factor would indicate that the individual feels that Christianity-based religion is a central aspect of self-identity, and is strongly linked to their Pacific culture.

===== Sample Religious Centrality and Embeddedness Items =====
- Going to Church is part of my culture and religion
- God has a strong connection to my culture
- Religion is not important for my culture (reverse coded)
- Part of being a Pacific Islander is having a connection with God
- Religion is the root of our Pasifika culture
- Our religion is the centre of our culture as Pacific Islanders

==== 4. Perceived Familial Wellbeing (PFW) ====
This factor assesses the individual's subjective satisfaction with their family, and the subjective well-being of and within their family. Family offers physical, mental, cultural, spiritual and social nurturance, and is an integral aspect of Pacific self-concept, closely tied to wellbeing. This factor assesses a variety of Pacific family values including respect, communication, relationships and happiness. High scores in this factor would indicate that the individual feels a strong sense of support from their family, and that the individual perceives their family as a whole to have a high level of wellbeing.

===== Sample Perceived Familial Wellbeing Items =====
- Your relationship with your parents
- Your family's security
- The respect you give for your parents
- The respect you receive from your family
- Your position in your family
- Your family's happiness
- Communication with your family

==== 5. Perceived Societal Wellbeing (PSW) ====
This factor reflects the individual's satisfaction with society and the support it offers. Satisfaction with society has a strong influence on the subjective wellbeing of Pacific people. Perceived support from society is assessed on various levels, from the local community level to the national government level and responses indicate how supported and integrated the Pacific individual feels in New Zealand. High scores on this factor would indicate that the individual feels satisfied, supported and accepted by all levels of New Zealand society.

===== Sample Perceived Societal Wellbeing Items =====
- Support provided to you by the New Zealand government to you as a Pacific Islander
- Your position in New Zealand as a Pacific person
- Your personal needs being met by New Zealand
- The support you receive as a Pacific Islander in the community you live in
- Your relationship with New Zealand society
- The support you receive in the community you live in
- The support you receive as a Pacific Islander in New Zealand

== Validation of the PIWBS ==
The Pacific Identity and Wellbeing Scale was developed and validated using exploratory factor analysis (EFA) and confirmatory factor analysis (CFA). The initial pool of 125 questions was developed based on previous Pacific research, a variety of other wellbeing and identity scales, discussions with Pacific peoples and the Multi-dimensional Model of Maori Identity and Cultural Engagement.

Exploratory factor analysis (EFA) was conducted to organise the 125 possible questions into groups (factors) based on similarity of topic. Individual items that did not fit a group well or that related to more than one group were not used. Thirty-one questions were retained which were found to measure the five distinct, yet interconnected factors of Pacific identity and wellbeing. Confirmatory factor analysis (CFA) was later used to confirm the structure of the PIWBS. All 31 items were found to be strongly related to the predicted factors. Cronbach's alpha (internal reliability) measures the extent to which all the questions in a section measure the same construct/factor consistently. The five factors of the PIWBS showed excellent internal reliability, with Cronbach's alphas all above α = 0.85. The minimum accepted standard of internal reliability is α = 0.70.

The PIWBS has been used in several studies to investigate the low levels of subjective well-being found among Pacific peoples who identify with multiple ethnic groups. Differences were found in levels of subjective well-being depending on the number of ethnic groups the individual associated with. For example, people who identified only as Pacific had higher levels of wellbeing than people who identified as both Pacific and non-Pacific (e.g. New Zealand European). However, there were no differences in wellbeing levels between people who identified as only Pacific, and people who identified with two Pacific groups (e.g. Tongan and Samoan). This suggests that lower wellbeing only occurred when the two ethnic groups associated with, were very different (e.g. Pacific and New Zealand European).

Identity Tension Effect: Associating with both a Pacific group and a majority ethnic group (e.g. New Zealand European) may lead to negative feelings about Pacific aspects of identity. This is because people who identify with multiple ethnic groups tend to be more likely to internalise negative stereotypes about Pacific people held by the majority. This can lead to identity confusion and lowered self-esteem.

Population projections suggest that the Pacific community will grow by 60% by 2026. Approximately one third of Pacific people identify as both Pacific and non-Pacific. This means that a growing percentage of the New Zealand population may be at risk of a number of negative outcomes. These outcomes include both lower self-esteem, as well as decreased feelings of support from family. Through applied research interventions such as challenging negative stereotypes and promoting positive stereotypes about Pacific peoples, it may be possible to address this problem.
