= Ranginui Walker =

New Zealand writer and academic

Ranginui Walker DCNZM
- Born: Ranginui Joseph Isaac Walker; 1 March 1932; Bay of Plenty, New Zealand
- Died: 29 February 2016 (aged 83); Auckland, New Zealand
- Education: University of Auckland
- Writing career
- Notable awards: Prime Minister's Award for Literary Achievement
- Scientific career
- Thesis: The social adjustment of the Maori to urban living in Auckland (1970)

Ranginui Joseph Isaac Walker DCNZM (1 March 1932 – 29 February 2016) was a New Zealand academic, author, and activist of Māori and Lebanese descent. Walker wrote about Māori land rights and cultural identity in his books and columns for the weekly New Zealand Listener and the monthly Metro magazine throughout the 1980s and 1990s.

== Early life ==
Walker was born in 1932 into a farming family on the tribal lands of Whakatōhea, near Ōpōtiki in the Bay of Plenty. His mother was Mihikore Walker. He was adopted by his mother's sister Wairata Walker and her husband Isaac Walker. He credited Wairata for helping him to learn Māori language and culture at a young age. In his own history of Whakatōhea (2007) Walker explained that at this time Māori language and culture were unfashionable, and that his generation was expected to assimilate.

== Education ==
Walker was sent to St Peter's Maori College Auckland at the age of twelve. He went on to attend Auckland Teachers' Training College, and worked as a primary school teacher for 10 years. He gained a Bachelor of Arts and a Diploma in Teaching in 1962, a Master's in 1965, and finished his doctorate in 1970. The title of his doctoral thesis was The social adjustment of the Maori to urban living in Auckland.

== Personal life ==
Walker met Deirdre Dodson at Auckland Teachers' Training College in Epsom, and the couple were married in 1953. They had three children. According to biographer Professor Paul Spoonley, "The acceptance of intermarriage was an issue for both sets of parents: Walker's parents were concerned that Deirdre was a Pākehā and not Roman Catholic; Deirdre’s were concerned that their daughter was to marry a Māori."

Walker commented that the country's race problems would be solved 'in the bedrooms of the nation.'

== Career and activism ==
Walker was a member of Māori activist group Ngā Tamatoa and Secretary of the Auckland District Māori Council from 1969 to 1973 and chairman from 1974 to 1990.

In 1993 he became the Professor and Head of Māori Studies at the University of Auckland.

In 2003, Walker became a member of the Waitangi Tribunal. He held a strong belief in Maori Identity, and had stated that William Hobson's declaration that "He iwi tahi tātou", meaning "We are now one people", in the Treaty of Waitangi, was a cultural attack on the indigenous people of New Zealand.

== Awards and honours ==
In the 2001 Queen's Birthday Honours, Walker was appointed a Distinguished Companion of the New Zealand Order of Merit, for services to Māori. When the New Zealand government restored titular honours in 2009, he declined redesignation as a Knight Companion of the New Zealand Order of Merit. Walker believed it was not appropriate to accept a knighthood which would undermine the significance of Māori sovereignty, an issue he stood firmly on. He was only one of two candidates to decline the knighthood, the other being Richie McCaw.

In 2009, Walker received a Prime Minister's Award for Literary Achievement.

Following Walker's death in 2016, Prime Minister John Key said Walker was "not only an insightful commentator on important historical and contemporary issues but was a tireless and passionate advocate for Māori".

Former Prime Minister Helen Clark tweeted "Greatly saddened by news of death of Ranginui Walker, one of New Zealand's finest people; eminent academic & author."

== Published works ==
Walker published a number of books, including:

- Perceptions and Attitudes of the New Generation of Maoris to Pakeha Domination (1981)
- History of Maori Activism (1983)
- The Treaty of Waitangi (1983)
- The Political Development of the Maori People in New Zealand (1984)
- The Meaning of Biculturalism (1986)
- Nga Mamae o te Iwi Maori: Te Ripoata o te Hui i Turangawaewae (1987)
- Nga Tau Tohetohe The Years of Anger (1987)
- Ka Whawhai Tonu Matou / Struggle Without End (1990) Second Edition (2004)
- Liberating Maori from Educational Subjection (1991)
- Nga Pepa a Ranginui The Walker Papers (1997)
- He Tipua The Life and Times of Sir Apirana Ngata (2001)
- Opotiki-Mai-Tawhiti Capital of Whakatohea (2007)

== Sources ==
- Margie Thomson, "Bridging the Gap", Dominion Post, 9 May 2009, "Your Weekend", p. 10.
- Paul Spoonley, Mata Toa: The Life and Times of Ranginui Walker, Penguin, Auckland 2009.
