= Māoriness =

Qualities of being Māori

Māoriness is the state or quality of being Māori, or of embodying Māori characteristics. It comprises the qualities that distinguish Māori and form the basis of their peoplehood and identity, and the expressions of Māori culture — such as habits, behaviours, or symbols — that have a common, familiar or iconic quality readily identifiable with the Māori people.

== Background ==
Māoriness has a multitude of dimensions, being expressed along many cultural axis points. The concept of Māoritanga, or Māori culture, such as in events like Te Matatini, forms a significant part of the fabric of behaviours and habits that form a sense of Māoriness.

In 1991, in a Hocken Collections study, Professor Atholl Anderson proposed that for many Māori, Māoriness had become confined to a simple acknowledgement of some native ancestry, especially for urban Māori people who may become isolated from their tribal roots. In his 2001 book Paradise Reforged, historian James Belich outlines how the legacy of the Young Māori Party created a form of "benign segregation", creating separate Māori elements for military, sport and land development in New Zealand and therefore nurturing a sense of Māoriness.

In 2017, scholar Elizabeth Kerekere has identified use of the term takatāpui as an important cultural bridging word, in rooting the LGBTQ community to its Māoriness and fostering acceptance. In 2018, political commentator Lizzie Marvelly discussed the difficulty justifying her whakapapa (a native genealogical custom, which is closely linked to Māoriness) as a "white Māori", and the societal need for a more inclusive description of Māoriness.

== Academic research ==
Published as research in the psychology department of Victoria University of Wellington, in 1960 Professor John Williams identified two forms of Māoriness; by enculturation and by cognitive choice, proposing there was both a conscious and unconscious manifestation of its expression. Williams created an "Index of Maoriness" questionnaire, which attempted to measure the socio-cultural make up of Māoriness.

In 1971, Journal of the Polynesian Society formed another model for the measurement of its ethnocultural expression. Dr Christina Stachurski has suggested that 1984's The Bone People provided a legitimate portrayal of Māoriness, partly due to the author Keri Hulme's Māori heritage.
