= Stephanie M. Carlson =

American developmental psychologist

- Born: November 8, 1969
- Education: Bucknell University, B.A. 1991; University of Oregon, Ph.D. 1997
- Scientific career
- Institutions: University of Minnesota Institute of Child Development (2007–present); University of Washington Department of Psychology (1998–2007)

Stephanie M. Carlson is an American developmental psychologist whose research has contributed to scientific understanding of the development of children's executive function skills, including psychometrics and the key roles of imagination and distancing. Carlson is Distinguished McKnight University Professor at the University of Minnesota, and co-founder of Reflection Sciences, Inc.

Professor Carlson is a graduate of Bucknell University (summa cum laude), and obtained her Ph.D. in psychology at the University of Oregon in 1997, where she studied with Marjorie Taylor, Lou Moses, Dare Baldwin, Mary Rothbart, and Michael Posner. From 1998 to 2007, she was assistant and then associate professor of psychology at the University of Washington. In 2007, she moved to the Institute of Child Development, University of Minnesota, where she co-directs (with Philip David Zelazo) the Developmental Social Cognitive Neuroscience Laboratory. She was promoted to professor in 2013, and named Distinguished McKnight University Professor in 2017.

In 2014, Carlson and Zelazo co-founded a university-based start-up company, Reflection Sciences, Inc., to disseminate information about executive function skills and provide tools for assessing those skills and promoting their healthy development.

In 2021, Carlson and Zelazo co-founded Reflective Performance, Inc., to measure and develop executive function skills for the adult work force.

== Research themes ==
Measurement of executive function in early childhood

Professor Carlson has made major contributions to the assessment of executive function skills in very young children, including the Less is More task, and the creation of the Minnesota Executive Function Scale (MEFS), a tablet-based direct assessment that is standardized, reliable, validated, normed, and suitable for children ages 2 years and up. This work stemmed from her influential research investigating the relation between executive function and theory of mind in young children.

Early experience and the development of executive function skills

Professor Carlson's research has examined how variations in early experiences relate to later differences in the development of executive function skills. Children with better executive function skills (independent of intelligence) generally have higher quality sleep in infancy, receive more autonomy-supportive parenting from both mothers and fathers, receive non-punitive discipline, and are raised bilingual. In contrast, children with worse executive function skills are more likely to have a history of deprived care, such as experience in orphanages, and prenatal exposure to alcohol.

The Batman effect

Carlson's work has shown how imagination and symbolization contribute to children's developing decision-making skills. Together with former students Rachel White and Emily Prager, and colleagues Angela Duckworth and Ethan Kross, Carlson has shown that asking children to role-play as if they were an exemplary character (e.g., Batman), which creates psychological distance, increases kindergarten children's executive function scores by the equivalent of 1 year of development, and helps them to resist a tempting video game and persist longer at tasks.

== Selected honors ==
Carlson is a Fellow of the Association for Psychological Science and the American Psychological Association (Division 7, Developmental), where she received a Dissertation Research Award (1995) and the Ainsworth Award for Excellence in Developmental Science (2022). In 2023-24, she received a James McKeen Cattell award for her sabbatical at Harvard University Graduate School of Education. She has been a Scientific Advisor to Transforming Education, the Minnesota Children's Museum, Playworks Minnesota, Understood.org, Sesame Workshop, Noggin, and Bright Horizons Family Solutions. Carlson delivered a TEDx Minneapolis talk about executive function skills in 2020.

== Selected works ==
- Taylor, M. & Carlson, S. M. (1997). The relation between individual differences in fantasy and theory of mind. Child Development, 68, 436–455.
- Carlson, S. M., Moses, L. J., & Hix, H. R. (1998). The role of inhibitory processes in young children's difficulties with deception and false belief. Child Development, 69, 672–691.
- Carlson, S. M., & Moses, L. J. (2001). Individual differences in inhibitory control and children's theory of mind. Child Development, 72, 1032–1053.
- Carlson, S. M. (2005). Developmentally sensitive measures of executive function in preschool children. Developmental Neuropsychology, 28, 595–616.
- Carlson, S. M., Davis, A., & Leach, J. G. (2005). Less is More: Executive function and symbolic representation in preschool children. Psychological Science, 16, 609–616.
- Carlson, S. M., & Wang, T. S. (2007). Inhibitory control and emotion regulation in preschool children. Cognitive Development, 22, 489–510.
- Carlson, S. M., & Meltzoff, A. (2008). Bilingual experience and executive functioning in young children. Developmental Science, 11, 282–298.
- Carlson, S. M. (2009). Social origins of executive function development. New Directions in Child and Adolescent Development, 123, 87–98.
- Carlson, S. M. (2010). Development of conscious control and imagination. In R. F., Baumeister, A. R. Mele, & K. D. Vohs (Eds.). Free will and consciousness: How might they work? (pp. 135–152). New York: Oxford.
- Zelazo, P. D., & Carlson, S. M. (2012). Hot and cool executive function in childhood and adolescence: Development and plasticity. Child Development Perspectives, 6, 354–360.
- Carlson, S. M., Zelazo, P. D., & Faja, S. (2013). Executive function. In P. D. Zelazo (Ed.), Oxford handbook of developmental psychology (Vol. 1, pp. 706–743). New York: Oxford University Press.
- White, R. E., & Carlson, S. M. (2015). What would Batman do? Social psychological distance improves executive function performance in young children. Developmental Science, 19, 419–426. doi: 10.1111/desc.12314.
- Carlson, S. M. (2023). Let me choose: The role of choice in the development of executive function skills. Current Directions in Psychological Science, 32(3), 220-227.
