= Religion, Brain & Behavior =

Academic journal on the scientific study of religion

- Discipline: Religious studies
- Language: English

Publication details
- History: 2011–present
- Publisher: Routledge (United Kingdom)
- Frequency: Quarterly
- Open access: Hybrid
- Impact factor: 4.7 (2025)

Standard abbreviations
- ISO 4: Relig. Brain Behav.

Indexing
- ISSN: 2153-599X (print); 2153-5981 (web)

Links
- Journal homepage

Religion, Brain & Behavior is a quarterly peer-reviewed academic journal on the scientific study of religion, published by Routledge. It was established in 2011 by neuroscientist Patrick McNamara, anthropologist Richard Sosis, and philosopher and theologian Wesley J. Wildman. Its stated aim is to advance biological approaches to understanding religion "at every level from brain to behavior". According to the Journal Citation Reports, the journal had a 2025 impact factor of 4.7 and ranked first of 345 journals in the Religion category by Journal Citation Indicator.

== History ==
The journal grew out of the International Conference on the Evolution of Religion, held in Hawaii in January 2007. McNamara, Sosis, and Wildman proposed it afterwards with the backing of the Institute for the Bio-Cultural Study of Religion, and, according to Sosis, Taylor & Francis agreed to publish it after several other publishers declined. The launch was announced in late 2010 and the first volume appeared in 2011, with three issues that year and quarterly publication from 2012. William Blake's The Web of Religion has been on its cover since the first issue. Joseph Bulbulia became a co-editor in 2015 and Uffe Schjoedt of Aarhus University in 2017; As of 2024, Sosis and Wildman continued to serve as editors, alongside seven new editors: Irene Cristofori, Suzanne Hoogeveen, Ryan McKay, Michael Price, Robert M. Ross, John Shaver, and Joseph Watts.

== Scope, indexing and reception ==
The journal publishes empirical and theoretical studies from fields including cognitive science, evolutionary psychology, evolutionary anthropology and religious studies. It is abstracted and indexed in the Arts and Humanities Citation Index, Scopus and the ATLA Religion Database.

The journal's 2025 Journal Citation Indicator was 6.62, the highest of the 345 journals in the Religion category, and it ranked first by this measure in each JCR year from 2019 to 2023.
