= John Fogarty (judge) =

New Zealand jurist (1947–2022)

The Honourable John Fogarty KC

Judge of the High Court
- In office 13 November 2003 – 11 August 2017

Personal details
- Born: John Gerard Fogarty; 12 August 1947 Greymouth, New Zealand
- Died: 10 December 2022 (aged 75) Auckland, New Zealand
- Education: University of Canterbury; University of Toronto
- Occupation: Lawyer, judge

John Gerard Fogarty KC (12 August 1947 – 10 December 2022) was a New Zealand jurist. He was appointed Queen's Counsel in 1990, and served as a judge at the High Court from 2003 to 2017.

== Early life ==
Fogarty was born in Greymouth on 12 August 1947. He studied law at the University of Canterbury, graduating with a Bachelor of Laws degree in 1971, before completing a Master of Laws degree at the University of Toronto in 1974.

== Legal career ==
Fogarty joined the Christchurch law firm of Weston Ward and Lascelles, becoming a partner in 1978. He began practising as a barrister sole in 1985, with an emphasis on public and commercial law, and also worked as an arbitrator and mediator. Fogarty was appointed Queen's Counsel in 1990.

On 13 November 2003, Fogarty was sworn in as a judge of the High Court, serving until 11 August 2017. On his retirement from the bench, he was granted the retention of the title The Honourable for life. Fogarty sat in the High Court in Christchurch until 2014, when he moved to Auckland. In 2013, he was Christchurch's civil list judge, and from 2007 to 2015 he was a member of the criminal and civil division of the Court of Appeal.

As a judge, Fogarty is best known for his ruling in the 2009 case of Takamore v Clarke, in which he found that the wife of James Takamore had the right to choose where her husband should be buried and could override the tikanga (customs) of the Māori tribe, Ngāi Tūhoe, into which he had been born. Fogarty's judgment was subsequently upheld by the Supreme Court.

For many years, Fogarty was an advisor to the Deaf Sports Federation of New Zealand, and he served as a member of the organising committee for the 1989 World Games for the Deaf that were held in Christchurch.

== Personal life and death ==
Fogarty was married to Nan Michelle Hall, and they had three children.

Fogarty died in Auckland on 10 December 2022, at the age of 75. The chief justice, Dame Helen Winkelmann, paid tribute to Fogarty, saying that he "brought to the bench a broad and deep knowledge of the law", and that "as a lawyer, and then as a judge, he worked selflessly for a just outcome." She also noted that "he was a man of unfailing courtesy" and that "he was also a kind, humble and elegant man – elegant in his style, in his thinking and in his writing."
