= Journal of Cognition and Development =

- Discipline: Cognitive development
- Language: English
- Edited by: Susan A. Graham

Publication details
- History: 2000–present
- Publisher: Taylor & Francis
- Frequency: 5/year
- Impact factor: 1.865 (2017)

Standard abbreviations
- ISO 4: J. Cogn. Dev.

Indexing
- ISSN: 1524-8372 (print); 1532-7647 (web)
- LCCN: sn99008560
- OCLC no.: 1077986682

Links
- Journal homepage; Online access; Online archive

The Journal of Cognition and Development is a peer-reviewed scientific journal dedicated to the study of cognitive development in humans and other animals. It was established in 2000 with Philip David Zelazo (University of Toronto) as the founding editor-in-chief. It is published five times per year by Taylor & Francis on behalf of the Cognitive Development Society, of which it is the official journal. The editor-in-chief is Susan A. Graham (University of Calgary). According to the Journal Citation Reports, the journal has a 2017 impact factor of 1.865, ranking it 43rd out of 70 journals in the category "Psychology, Developmental" and 56th out of 84 journals in the category "Psychology, Experimental".
