= Kaumātua =

Elder from tribal groups of the Māori people

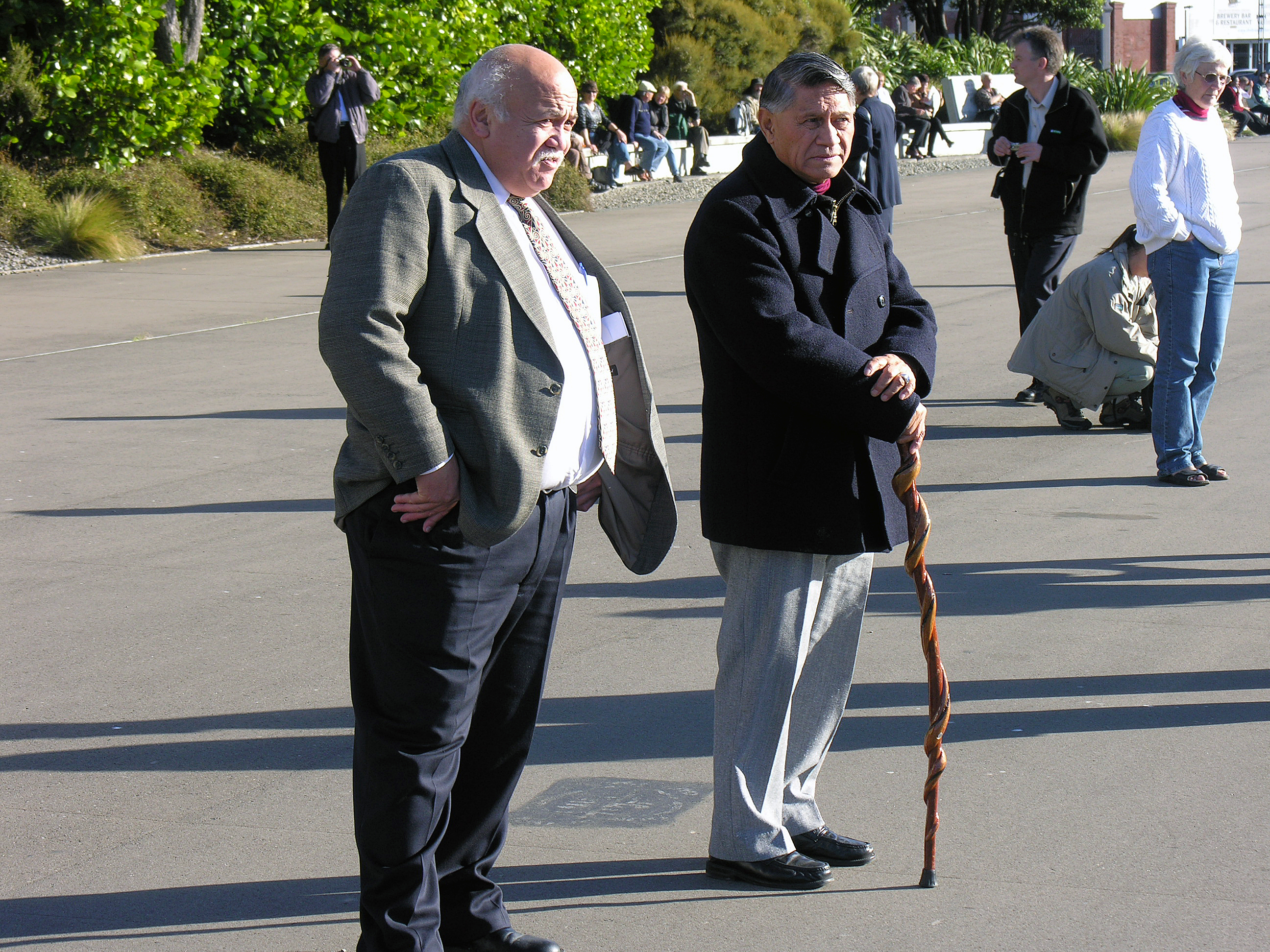
Two kaumātua at the sinking of HMNZS Wellington (F-69)

A kaumātua is a respected tribal elder in a Māori community who has been involved with their whānau for some years. They are appointed by their people who believe the chosen elders have the capacity to teach and guide both current and future generations. Kaumātua have good knowledge of Māori tikanga, language and history; and their contribution ensures that the mana of the whānau, hapū and iwi are maintained. Cleve Barlow (1994) refers to kaumātua as being the "keepers of knowledge and traditions of the family, sub-tribe and tribe". Although the term kaumātua is widely used to refer to all elders, male kaumātua are more correctly called koroua or koro, and female elders are called kuia.

The word kaumātua comes from kau, meaning alone, without or none, and mātua, meaning parents; thus, kaumātua literally means "no parents" and reflects how the parents of older generations have passed on.

== Characteristics ==
Kaumātua never self-proclaim their elder status, as the rules of mana prohibit this; instead the people acknowledge an elder's status as kaumātua. Kaumātua comport themselves with humility, honesty, and integrity, and typically possess deep knowledge of a particular subject such as whakapapa or tikanga, and know people who have expertise in other fields.

== Powers ==
In the past, kaumātua were believed to be "the reincarnation of a person who had acquired a supernatural or godly status after death, and who had become the protector of the family". These supernatural powers allowed the reincarnated spirits to return to earth to provide influential guidance to the remaining family. It was believed that these powers allowed the kaumātua to transform themselves into birds, fish and insects. Elders of the tribe referred to these transformed states when predicting the future and fortunes of the tribe. Additionally, along with leadership and guidance of family and marae, many kaumātua exert a protective influence over the seas, rivers, lands, and forests.

== Relationships with health organisations ==
Kaumātua are essential to any Māori community as well as health organisations that have affiliations with Māori. This includes kaimatai hinengaro (clinical psychologists), especially if they treat Māori clients or carry out health research on Māori participants. Kaumātua who are involved in health organisations play a pivotal role in guiding kaimatai hinengaro, similar to their role in the Māori community.

Whilst the importance of kaumātua guidance has been predominantly acknowledged by Māori, greater awareness in non-Māori circles is beginning to acknowledge their knowledge bases as well. Non-Māori kaimatai hinengaro treating Māori clients or carrying out medical research on Māori are realizing the benefits of working under the guidance of kaumātua. For kaimatai hinengaro carrying out health research on Māori, kaumātua of local iwi can be contacted through Te Puni Kōkiri. The offices of Te Puni Kōkiri employ Māori liaison authorities who maintain a "register of local iwi contact people". Once contact is made, research objectives and outcomes are discussed with kaumātua and other tribal elders. Key contact individuals are appointed for both the research and iwi sides. While the contact person for the research may be the kaimatai hinengaro, kaumātua usually represent the iwi and provide feedback on satisfaction with research methods and treatment of Māori participants.
