= Burial of James Takamore =

The burial of James Takamore was a family conflict and consequent legal precedent in New Zealand, regarding the right to decide where a body should be buried. Legal judgment reflected tension between Māori custom (tikanga) and English-based common law.

James Takamore was born into the Whakatōhea and Ngāi Tūhoe tribes in the Bay of Plenty but lived in Christchurch, returning to the North Island only twice in 20 years and expressing to third parties his identification as a "South Island Māori". After his death in 2007, a dispute arose whether he should be buried in Christchurch, as he and his wife intended, or in the traditional burial ground (urupa) of his family in Kutarere.

Ultimately the Supreme Court of New Zealand upheld the common law principle that the executor of a deceased person's will has both the right and the duty to dispose of the deceased. The court gave Takamore's wife permission to exhume his body, and return him to Christchurch, but Tūhoe members refused and police would not use force to carry through with the disinterment. In 2015 the conflict was resolved after court mediation in Christchurch and Takamore's body remained in the Bay of Plenty, though the details of the settlement have not been made public.

== Dispute over burial ==
After his sudden death of an aneurysm in 2007, a dispute arose as to where he should be buried. Ngāi Tūhoe custom requires bodies (tūpāpaku) be buried at family burial sites (urupa). Takamore had expressed a wish to be buried in Christchurch. His wife and executor of his will, Denise Clarke, also wished him to be buried in Christchurch.

Takamore's North Island family travelled south to Christchurch for the tangi (funeral rite) which was to be held at Te Whare Roimata marae in Christchurch. Prior to the tangi, there was a confrontation at the funeral parlour, in which Takamore's sister and other members of her family expressed a wish to return James to his ancestral home; after the confrontation grew heated, Clarke left. The Takamore family took the body north to the family cemetery at Kutarere, in the eastern Bay of Plenty. Clarke obtained a court order barring burial, but police arriving to enforce the court order found the burial already in progress and did not enforce it. The rationale given for burying in the urupa included:

[H]is [umbilical] cord is here, we can't stretch it to the South Island.
Ms Clarke should have fought harder to keep her partner in Christchurch and not left the marae when conversation between the two sides became heated. If she wanted her husband to stay there, she should have stayed there, irrespective of what happened.

== High Court ==
The High Court ruled that Clarke had the right to determine where Takamore was to be buried, with the judge, John Fogarty, saying:

On the evidence I have heard, Tuhoe tikanga in its current form, has not adapted to accommodate a personal right on the part of an individual of Tuhoe descent, living outside tribal life, to make decisions for him or herself, or for their immediate family to make decisions on their own behalf, as to where his or her body is to be buried. This is not to say that Tuhoe tikanga may not adapt in that direction in the future. That, however, is a matter for Tuhoe and not a matter for this court.

== Court of Appeal ==
The North Island family appealed against the ruling. The Court of Appeal ruled for Clarke and the police were prepared to enforce an exhumation order.

Opinion about the case was mixed, with a number siding with the Takamore whānau citing the United Nations Declaration on the Rights of Indigenous Peoples which gives indigenous people's traditional practices legal weight. The court of appeal decision explicitly considered the declaration.

== Supreme Court ==
The Supreme Court heard the case on the grounds of: "whether the Court of Appeal was correct to hold that New Zealand law entitled the executrix to determine disposal of the body of the deceased and whether it was correct to hold that the executrix is entitled to take possession of the body of the deceased not withstanding its burial."

The result was a split decision confirming Clarke's rights to determine disposal of the body.

== Confrontation ==
An August 2014 attempt to enforce the Supreme Count decision was halted when police refused to use force to overcome considerable local resistance to the exhumation.

== Mediation ==
Multi-party mediation in June 2015 led to a resolution and settlement that has not been released.

The case led to new research on Māori customary burial practises, which had been dismissed by the Supreme Court with a 79-page judgement which acknowledged "significant cross-cultural misunderstanding" but upheld the common law rule.

== Similar cases ==
In 1991, similar dispute broke out after the death of comedian Billy T. James, and his funeral in Auckland was cancelled after James's uncle and others took the body from his home in Muriwai. James was buried at his tribe's Mount Taupiri urupa in the Waikato, against the wishes of his wife.

A previous similar case involved Ngāpuhi descendant whose whānau tried to have his body returned from Otago to the Far North.

Disputes over the disposition of bodies is not uncommon in cases of alleged domestic violence.
