= Tangata tiriti =

Term for non-Māori New Zealanders

Tangata Tiriti (or tangata tiriti) is a Māori-language phrase used in English, particularly in New Zealand. It generally means a non-Māori in New Zealand, or 'people of the Treaty', in reference to the Treaty of Waitangi (Māori: Te Tiriti o Waitangi).

== Etymology ==
In the Māori language it means people of the treaty. Tangata is a human or individual. Not capitalised 'tiriti' refers to a treaty, and capitalised Tiriti, refers to the Treaty of Waitangi (Māori: Te Tiriti o Waitangi). First coined by Sir Edward Taihakurei Durie, the chair of the Waitangi Tribunal, at Waitangi in 1989. He referred to Tangata Tiriti as those who belong to New Zealand by right of the Treaty of Waitangi.

== Meaning and use ==
The Oxford Dictionary of New Zealandisms published in 2014 defines tangata Tiriti as, "non-indigenous New Zealanders, in Treaty of Waitangi partnership with Māori as tangata whenua."

Sociologist Avril Bell states that the reference of non-Māori as tangata Tiriti is to acknowledge that the Treaty of Waitangi is not just about Māori, but also about non-Māori. Non-Māori are many ethnicities and heritages in New Zealand, and are also named tauiwi (lit. foreigner, non-Maori). There is a growing body of discourse about the term tangata Tiriti being not a passive identity, but active. Scholar Lincoln Dam describes the term as, "a relational orientation that invokes ethical-political responsibilities. These responsibilities include seeking to understand settler identities, building productive relationships with Māori, engaging with critical histories of Aotearoa-New Zealand, and supporting Māori struggles for justice."

== Culture ==
The website domain tangatatiriti.org, registered by a self aspiring tangata tiriti, hosts "a simple but accurate copy of the treaty documents" as an educational resource with some commentary

In 2026, a group called Victoria's pledge gained attention seeking to educate about the treaty, with a headline "Tangata Tiriti in the mix"

== See also ==
- Pākehā
