= Taha Māori =

The Māori perspective on a subject

Taha Māori is a New Zealand phrase, used in both Māori and New Zealand English. It means "the Māori side (of a question)" or "the Māori perspective" as opposed to the Pākehā or European side or perspective.

In many New Zealand families, particularly those established for two or three generations or more, there has been intermarriage between Māori and Pākehā. This means that a large proportion of people born in New Zealand are of mixed descent, both Māori and Pākehā. The Taha Māori refers not to their ancestry so much as to the customs of their Māori ancestors and appropriateness of both acknowledging and following these customs.

For many years Pākehā custom and usage has been dominant in New Zealand. However, since about the 1980s the place of Māori custom in New Zealand society has been increasingly recognized, albeit reluctantly, by many sections of the populace.

A person who accepts their Taha Māori will often try to live according to Tikanga Māori.

== See also ==
- Māori culture
