= Niki Harré =

New Zealand academic

- Education: University of Auckland
- Scientific career
- Workplaces: University of Auckland
- Thesis: The young driver : a highway warrior? (1996)
- Doctoral students: Carla Houkamau

Nicole (Niki) Harré is a New Zealand academic and as of 2019 is a full professor at the University of Auckland specialising in community psychology and the psychology of sustainability at University of Auckland. Her research addresses issues of sustainability, citizenship, values and political activism. Harré is the author of Psychology for a Better World: Strategies to Inspire Sustainability and The Infinite Game How to Live Well Together.

== Academic career ==
After a PhD titled 'The young driver: a highway warrior? ' at the University of Auckland, Harré taught to the University of Auckland, rising to full professor.

Notable students of Harré include Carla Houkamau, professor of psychology at Auckland.

== Selected works ==
- Harré, Niki, John Read. "The role of biological and genetic causal beliefs in the stigmatisation of'mental patients'." Journal of mental health 10, no. 2 (2001): 223–235.
- Brug, Johannes, Mark Conner, Niki Harre, Stef Kremers, Susan McKellar, and Sandy Whitelaw. "The Transtheoretical Model and stages of change: a critique: observations by five commentators on the paper by Adams, J. and White, M.(2004) why don't stage-based activity promotion interventions work?." Health education research 20, no. 2 (2005): 244–258.
- Harré, Niki, Jeff Field, and Barry Kirkwood. "Gender differences and areas of common concern in the driving behaviors and attitudes of adolescents." Journal of Safety Research 27, no. 3 (1996): 163–173.
- Harré, Niki, Susan Foster, and Maree O'Neill. "Self‐enhancement, crash‐risk optimism and the impact of safety advertisements on young drivers." British journal of psychology 96, no. 2 (2005): 215–230.
- Harré, Niki. "Risk evaluation, driving, and adolescents: A typology." Developmental Review 20, no. 2 (2000): 206–226.
