= Philip David Zelazo =

- Born: October 21, 1966 (age 59)
- Education: McGill University, B.A. 1988; Yale University, Ph.D. 1993
- Scientific career
- Workplaces: University of Minnesota Department of Child Development (2007–present); University of Toronto Department of Psychology (1992–2007); Southwest University (2004–2012)

Philip David Zelazo (born 1966) is a developmental psychologist and neuroscientist. His research has helped shape the field of developmental cognitive neuroscience regarding the development of executive function (i.e., conscious self-control of thought, action, and emotion).

== Background ==
Zelazo earned an Honours B.A. from McGill University (1988) and a Ph.D. with Distinction from Yale University (1993). From 1992 to 2007, he was on the faculty at the University of Toronto, where he held the Canada Research Chair in Developmental Neuroscience. In 2007, Zelazo moved to the University of Minnesota, where he holds the Nancy M. and John E. Lindahl Professorship in the Institute of Child Development, and is co-director (with Stephanie M. Carlson) of the Developmental Social Cognitive Neuroscience Lab. He also co-founded (2004) and served as co-director of a child development research center at Southwest University in Chongqing, China, until 2012. His father, Philip Roman Zelazo, is a psychologist and Director of the Montreal Autism Centre.

Zelazo has authored over 160 scientific papers. Among numerous other volumes, Zelazo co-edited the Cambridge Handbook of Consciousness, and Developmental Social Cognitive Neuroscience, and he edited The Oxford Handbook of Developmental Psychology (2013, 2 volumes). (see Google Scholar).

== Research ==
Professor Zelazo studies the development and neural bases of executive function. His work has generated a number of influential ideas, including the "Cognitive Complexity & Control Theory", the notion that executive function depends, in part, on the ability to use complex, higher-order rules (formulated in self-directed speech); "Levels of Consciousness", the notion that conscious control develops through a series of levels characterized by greater degrees of reflection; the "Iterative Reprocessing Model", which posits that reflection occurs when information is reprocessed via neural circuits involving the prefrontal cortex; the "Hierarchical Competing Systems Model" of the early emergence of executive function; and the importance of the distinction between more “cool,” cognitive aspects of executive function vs. more “hot,” emotional aspects.

Other research interests include: Affective decision-making; prefrontal and orbitofrontal contributions to executive function (using EEG/ERP and fMRI); Executive function in special populations (externalizing disorders, autism); Computational models of cognitive processes; Mindfulness meditation; Consciousness; Developmental chronopsychology (circadian rhythms, sleep, and psychological function); Language and other cultural influences on cognitive development.

Zelazo also has made major methodological contributions to the study of executive function, including the "Dimensional Change Card Sorting Task", which demonstrated a striking developmental shift from age 3 to 5 years in rule-based reasoning and self-control, and has become a leading behavioral assessment of executive function for preschool children. He was lead developer of the executive function measures for the NIH Toolbox for the Assessment of Neurological and Behavioral Function. He served on the Scientific and Coordinating Committee for Health Measurement (SCCHM), National Children's Study, where he was the lead scientist for the Cognitive Health Domain.

In 2014, Zelazo and Stephanie M. Carlson co-founded a university-based start-up company, Reflection Sciences, Inc., to disseminate information about executive function skills and provide tools for assessing those skills and promoting their healthy development. Reflection Sciences, Inc. distributes the Minnesota Executive Function Scale (MEFS), a tablet-based direct assessment of executive functions (See Stephanie M. Carlson). Together with John Carlson, Stephanie Carlson and Zelazo also co-founded Reflective Performance, Inc., which supports adults in the workforce.

Current investigations in Zelazo's lab include behavioral and brain developmental research in executive function, mindfulness meditation, and reflection training to improve executive function as well as academic and social adjustment in childhood.

== Selected Honors ==
- APA Award for Distinguished Contributions to Developmental Psychology, 2025
- Fellow, American Association for the Advancement of Science, 2023
- President, Jean Piaget Society, 2011–2014
- Senior Fellow, Mind and Life Institute, 2010
- Fellow, American Psychological Society, 2008
- Canada's Top 40 Under 40 Award, 2006
- Fellow, American Psychological Association, Division 7, 2002
- Canada Research Chair in Developmental Neuroscience, 2001–2006, 2006–2007 (resigned)
- Premier's Research Excellence Award (Government of Ontario, Canada), 1999
- Boyd McCandless Young Scientist Award, American Psychological Association (Div. 7), 1997

== Selected works ==
- Zelazo, P. D., Astington, J. W., & Olson, D. R. (Eds.) (1999). Developing theories of intention: Social understanding and self-control. Mahwah, NJ: Erlbaum.
- Zelazo, P. D., Muller, U., Frye, D., & Marcovitch, S. (2003). The development of executive function in early childhood. Monographs of the Society for Research in Child Development, 68(3), Serial No. 27.
- Zelazo, P. D. (2004). The development of conscious control in childhood. Trends in Cognitive Sciences, 8, 12–17.
- Kerr, A., & Zelazo, P. D. (2004). Development of "hot" executive function: The Children's Gambling Task. Brain and Cognition, 55, 148-157.
- Bunge, S., & Zelazo, P. D. (2006). A brain-based account of the development of rule use in childhood. Current Directions in Psychological Science, 15, 118–121.
- Zelazo, P. D. (2006). The dimensional change card sort (DCCS): A method of assessing executive function in children. Nature Protocols, 1, 297–301.
- Zelazo, P. D., Moscovitch, M., & Thompson, E. (Eds.) (2007). Cambridge handbook of consciousness. New York: Cambridge University Press.
- Cunningham, W., & Zelazo, P. D. (2007). Attitudes and evaluation: A social cognitive neuroscience perspective. Trends in Cognitive Sciences, 11, 97–104.
- Zelazo, P. D., Carlson, S. M., & Kesek, A. (2008). The development of executive function in childhood. In C. Nelson & M. Luciana (Eds), Handbook of Developmental Cognitive Neuroscience (2nd Ed.) (pp. 553–574). Cambridge, MA: MIT Press.
- Marcovitch, S., & Zelazo, P. D. (2009). A hierarchical competing systems model of the emergence and early development of executive function (Target article with commentaries). Developmental Science. 12, 1-18.
- Zelazo, P. D. Chandler, M., & Crone, E. A. (Eds.) (2009). Developmental social cognitive neuroscience. New York: Psychology Press.
- Lewis, M., Lamm, C., Segalowitz, S., Stieben, J., & Zelazo, P. D. (2006). Neurophysiological correlates of emotion regulation in children and adolescents. Journal of Cognitive Neuroscience, 18, 430–443.
- Espinet, S. D., Anderson, J. E., & Zelazo, P. D. (2013). Reflection training improves executive function in preschool-age children: Behavioral and neural effects. Developmental Cognitive Neuroscience, 4, 3–15.
- Zelazo, P. D., & Carlson, S. M. (2012). Hot and cool executive function in childhood and adolescence: Development and plasticity. Child Development Perspectives, 6, 354–360.
- Zelazo, P. D., & Lyons, K. E. (2012). The potential benefits of mindfulness training in early childhood: A developmental social cognitive neuroscience perspective. Child Development Perspectives, 6, 154–160.
- Hahn, C., Cowell, J. M., Wiprzycka, U. J., Goldstein, D., Ralph, M., Hasher, L., & Zelazo, P. D. (2012). Circadian rhythms in executive function during the transition to adolescence: The effect of synchrony between chronotype and time of day. Developmental Science, 15, 408–416.
- Zelazo, P. D., & Carlson, S. M. (2012). Hot and cool executive function in childhood and adolescence: Development and plasticity. Child Development Perspectives, 6, 354–360. doi:10.1111/j.1750-8606.2012.00246.x
- Masten, A. S., Herbers, J. E., Desjardins, C. D., Cutuli, J. J., McCormick, C. M., Sapienza, J. K., Long, J. D., & Zelazo, P. D. (2012). Executive function skills and school success in young children experiencing homelessness. Educational Researcher, 41, 373–384. doi:10.3102/0013189X12459883
- Ortner, C. M. N., Zelazo, P. D., Anderson, A. K. (2013). Effects of emotion regulation on concurrent attentional performance. Motivation and Emotion, 37, 346–354. doi:10.1007/s11031-012-9310-9
- Zelazo, P. D., Anderson, J. E., Richler, J., Wallner-Allen, K., Beaumont, J. L., & Weintraub, S. (2013). NIH Toolbox Cognition Battery (CB): Measuring executive function and attention. Monographs of the Society for Research in Child Development, 78(4), 16–33. doi:10.1111/mono.12032
- Benson, J., Sabbagh, M., Carlson, S. M., & Zelazo, P. D. (2013). Individual differences in executive functioning predict preschoolers’ improvement from theory-of-mind training. Developmental Psychology, 49, 1615–1627. doi:10.1037/a0031056
- Lahat, A., Helwig, C., & Zelazo, P. D. (2013). An event-related potential study of adolescents’ and young adults' judgments of moral and social conventional violations. Child Development. 84, 955–969. doi:10.1111/cdev.12001
- Espinet, S. D., Anderson, J. E., & Zelazo, P. D. (2013). Reflection training improves executive function in preschool-age children: Behavioral and neural effects. Developmental Cognitive Neuroscience, 4, 3–10. doi:10.1016/j.dcn.2012.11.009
- Zelazo, P. D., Anderson, J. E., Richler, J., Wallner-Allen, K., Beaumont, J. L., Conway, K. P., Gershon, R., & Weintraub, S. (2014). NIH Toolbox Cognition Battery (CB): Validation of executive function measures in adults. Journal of the International Neuropsychological Society, 20, 620–629. doi:10.1017/S1355617714000472
- Shapiro, S. L., Lyons, K. E., Miller, R. C., Butler, B., Vieten, C., & Zelazo, P. D. (2015). Contemplation in the classroom: A new direction for improving self-regulation in early childhood. Educational Psychology Review, 27, 1–30. doi:10.1007/s10648-014-9265-3
- Doebel, S., & Zelazo, P. D. (2015). A meta-analysis of the Dimensional Change Card Sort: Implications for developmental theories and the measurement of executive function in children. Developmental Review, 38, 241–268. doi:10.1016/j.dr.2015.09.001
- Zelazo, P. D. (2015). Executive function: Reflection, iterative reprocessing, complexity, and the developing brain. Developmental Review, 38, 55–68. doi:10.1016/j.dr.2015.07.001
- Woltering, S., Lishak, V., Hodgson, N., Granic, I., & Zelazo, P. D. (2016). Executive function in children with externalizing and comorbid internalizing behavior problems. Journal of Child Psychology and Psychiatry, 57(1), 30–38. doi:10.1111/jcpp.12428
- Doebel, S., & Zelazo, P. D. (2016). Seeing conflict and engaging control: Experience with contrastive language benefits executive function in preschoolers. Cognition, 157, 219–226. doi:10.1016/j.cognition.2016.09.010
- Meuwissen, A. S., Anderson, J. E., & Zelazo, P. D. (2017). The creation and validation of the Developmental Emotional Faces Stimulus Set. Behavior Research Methods, 49(3), 960–966. doi:10.3758/s13428-016-0756-7
- Galinsky, E., Bezos, J., McClelland, M., Carlson, S. M., & Zelazo, P. D. (2017). Civic science for public use: Mind in the Making and Vroom. Child Development, 88(5), 1409–1418. doi:10.1111/cdev.12892
- Zelazo, P. D., Blair, C. B., & Willoughby, M. T. (2017). Executive function: Implications for education (NCER 2017-2000). Washington, DC: National Center for Education Research, Institute of Education Sciences, U.S. Department of Education. This report is available on the Institute website at https://ies.ed.gov/ncer/pubs/20172000/pdf/20172000.pdf (142 pp.)
- Zelazo, P. D., Forston, J. L., Masten, A. S., & Carlson. S. M. (2018). Mindfulness plus reflection training: Effects on executive function in early childhood. Frontiers in Psychology, 9:208. doi:10.3389/fpsyg.2018.00208
- Semenov, A. D., & Zelazo, P. D. (2019). Mindful family routines and the cultivation of executive function skills in childhood. Human Development, 63, 112–131. doi:10.1159/000503822
- Zelazo, P. D. (2020). Executive function and psychopathology: A neurodevelopmental perspective. Annual Review of Clinical Psychology, 16. doi:10.1146/annurev-clinpsy-072319-024242
- Zelazo, P. D., & Carlson, S. M. (2020). The neurodevelopment of executive function skills: Implications for academic achievement gaps. Psychology and Neuroscience, 13 (3), 273–298. doi:10.1037/pne0000208
- Zelazo, P. D., Lourenco, S. F., Frank, M. C., Elison, J. T., Heaton, R. K., Wellman, H. M., Slotkin, J., Kharitonova, M., & Reznick, J. S. (2021). Measurement of cognition for the National Children's Study. Frontiers in Pediatrics, 9, 603126. doi:10.3389/fped.2021.603126 PMCID: PMC8200393, PMID 34136435
- Perone, S., Anderson, A. J., & Zelazo, P. D. (2021). The influence of parental guidance on video game performance, exploration, and cortical activity in 5-year-old children. Cognitive Development, 60, 101126. doi:10.1016/j.cogdev.2021.101126
- Dumont, E., Castellanos-Ryan, N., Parent, S., Séguin, J. R., Zelazo, P. D. (2022). Transactional longitudinal relations between accuracy and reaction time on a measure of cognitive flexibility: The transition to kindergarten. Developmental Science, e13254. doi:10.1111/desc.13254
- Calma-Birling, D., & Zelazo, P. D. (2022). Risk and resilience factors associated with psychological distress and positive adaptation during the COVID-19 pandemic. American Psychologist, 77(6), 727–742. doi:10.1037/amp0001023
- Zelazo, P. D., & Carlson, S. M. (2023): Reconciling the context-dependency and domain-generality of executive function skills from a developmental systems perspective. Journal of Cognition and Development, 24, 205–222. doi:10.1080/15248372.2022.2156515
- Zelazo, P. D., Calma-Birling, D., & Galinsky, E. (2024). Fostering executive function skills and promoting far transfer to real-world outcomes: The importance of life skills and civic science. Current Directions in Psychological Science, 33, 121–127. doi:10.1177/09637214241229664
