= Cultural Diversity and Ethnic Minority Psychology =

- Discipline: Social Psychology
- Language: English
- Edited by: Richard M. Lee (Outgoing), Su Yeong Kim (Incoming)

Publication details
- History: 1995-present
- Publisher: American Psychological Association (USA)
- Frequency: Quarterly
- Impact factor: 4.035 (2021)

Standard abbreviations
- ISO 4: Cult. Divers. Ethn. Minor. Psychol.

Indexing
- ISSN: 1099-9809 (print); 1939-0106 (web)

Links
- Journal homepage; Online access

Cultural Diversity and Ethnic Minority Psychology is the quarterly academic journal of the American Psychological Association Division 45: Society for the Psychological Study of Culture, Ethnicity, and Race. It covers the psychological science of culture, ethnicity, and race. The first issue of the journal appeared in 1995. The editor is Richard M. Lee (University of Minnesota).

== Abstracting and indexing ==
The journal is abstracted and indexed by MEDLINE/PubMed, EMBASE, PsycINFO, Sociological Abstracts, and the Social Sciences Citation Index. According to the Journal Citation Reports, the journal has a 2021 impact factor of 4.035.

== See also ==
- Cultural diversity
- List of psychology journals
