= Chris Sibley =

New Zealand academic

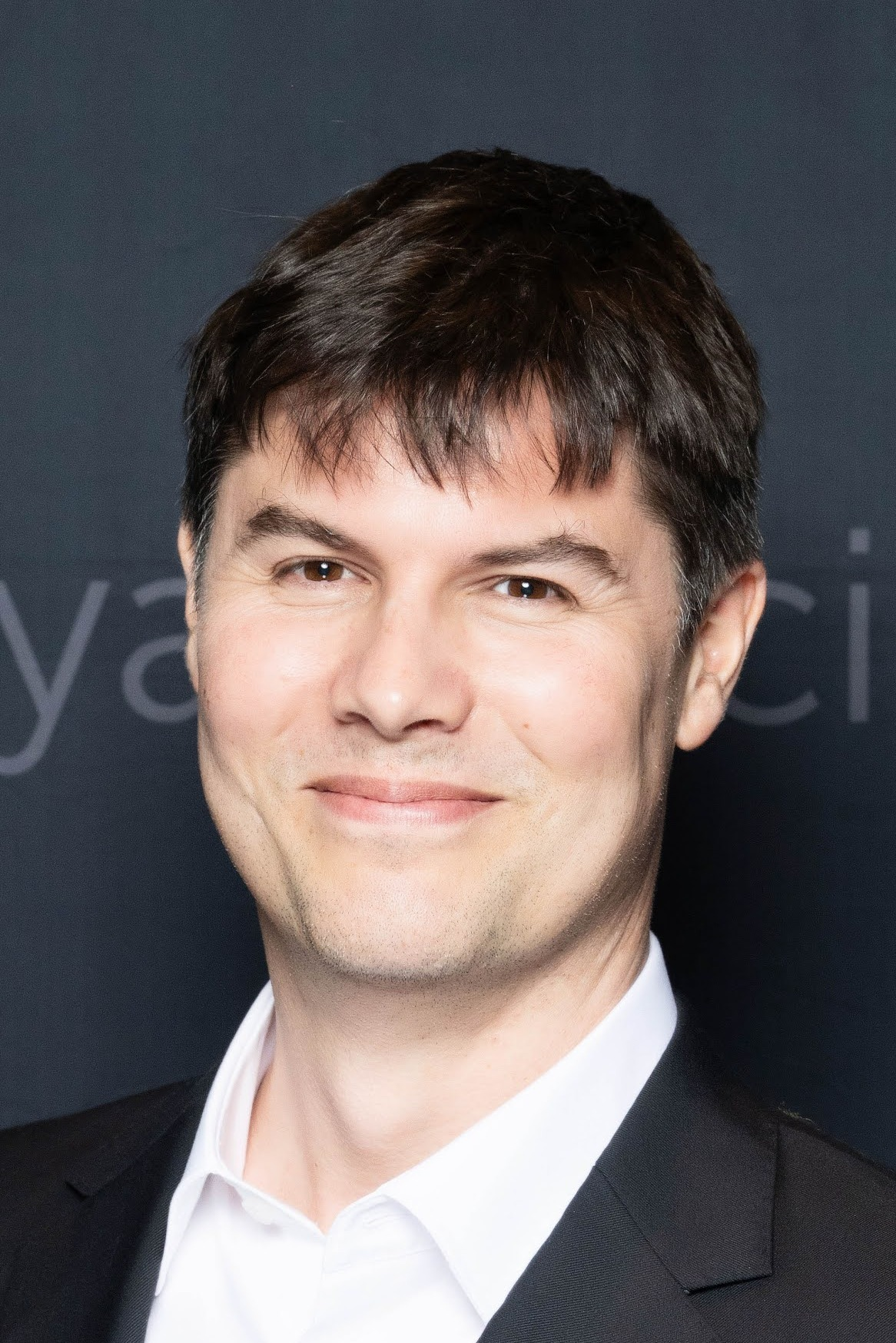
- Sibley in 2025
- Education: Victoria University of Wellington
- Known for: New Zealand Attitudes and Values Study
- Awards: Erik Erikson Award for Early Career Achievement, International Society of Political Psychology (2014)
- Scientific career
- Fields: Social attitudes, prejudice
- Workplaces: University of Auckland

Christopher Gordon Sibley is a professor in the School of Psychology at the University of Auckland and the lead investigator for the New Zealand Attitudes and Values Study. Sibley's research focuses on understanding how people's connections with others around them interact with environmental and economic factors to cause change in personality, political attitudes, social values and psychological health over time. In 2014, he was the recipient of the Erik Erikson Award for Early Career Achievement, awarded by the International Society of Political Psychology. Sibley is also the editor of the Cambridge Handbook of the Psychology of Prejudice and the Cambridge Handbook of Political Psychology, as well as one of the developers of the Multi-dimensional model of Māori identity and cultural engagement.

== Career ==
His laboratory runs a 20-year longitudinal national probability study of social attitudes, personality and health outcomes. The NZAVS has been central in answering a variety of important research questions, and has published research about religion and the Christchurch earthquakes, Māori identity and wellbeing, as well as sexism, racism and personality in New Zealand.

== Life ==
Sibley grew up in Wainuiomata and Lower Hutt, where he attended Naenae College. He began his undergraduate study at Victoria University of Wellington in 1997 and completed his PhD in 2005. He has lived in Auckland since 2006, is an avid reader of science fiction novels and a keen hiker.

== Awards ==
- 2025 Durie Medal of the Royal Society Te Apārangi
- 2017 Research Excellence Award, University of Auckland, awarded to the New Zealand Attitudes and Values Study research team
- 2014 Erik Erikson Award for Early Career Achievement, International Society of Political Psychology
- 2011 Listed as a 'Rising Star' by the Association for Psychological Science
- 2010 Early Career Research Excellence Award from the University of Auckland

== Peer-reviewed publications ==
Sibley has published more than 400 peer-reviewed publications. This section provides a list of selected publications that have received considerable academic and research attention.

- Milfont, T. L., Zubielevitch, E., Milojev, P., & Sibley, C. G.. (2021). Ten-year panel data confirm generation gap but climate beliefs increase at similar rates across ages. Nature Communications, 12(1). https://doi.org/10.1038/s41467-021-24245-y
- Sibley, C. G., Greaves, L. M., Satherley, N., Wilson, M. S., Overall, N. C., Lee, C. H. J., Milojev, P., Bulbulia, J., Osborne, D., Milfont, T. L., Houkamau, C. A., Duck, I. M., Vickers-Jones, R., & Barlow, F. K. (2020). Effects of the COVID-19 pandemic and nationwide lockdown on trust, attitudes toward government, and well-being. American Psychologist, 75(5), 618–630. https://doi.org/10.1037/amp0000662
- Sibley, C. G., & Osborne, D. (2016). Ideology and Post-Colonial Society. Political Psychology, 37, 115-161.https://doi.org/10.1111/pops.12323
- Shaver, J. H., Troughton, G., Sibley, C. G., & Bulbulia, J. A. (2016). Religion and the Unmaking of Prejudice toward Muslims: Evidence from a Large National Sample. PLoS ONE, 11 (3) https://doi.org/10.1371/journal.pone.0150209
- Dawtry, R. J., Sutton, R. M., & Sibley, C. G. (2015). Why Wealthier People Think People Are Wealthier, and Why It Matters: From Social Sampling to Attitudes to Redistribution. Psychological Science, 26 (9), 1389-1400. https://doi.org/10.1177/0956797615586560
- Houkamau, C. A., & Sibley, C. G. (2015). The Revised Multidimensional Model of Māori Identity and Cultural Engagement (MMM-ICE2). Social Indicators Research, 122 (1), 279-296. https://doi.org/10.1007/s11205-014-0686-7
- Sibley, C. G., & Bulbulia, J.. (2012). Faith after an Earthquake: A Longitudinal Study of Religion and Perceived Health before and after the 2011 Christchurch New Zealand Earthquake. PLOS ONE, 7(12), e49648. https://doi.org/10.1371/journal.pone.0049648
