= Waiariki Institute of Technology =

Waiariki Institute of Technology (Māori: Whare Takiura o Waiariki) was a tertiary institution based in the city of Rotorua, New Zealand, in the Bay of Plenty region in the central North Island. In May 2016, it merged with Bay of Plenty Polytechnic to form Toi Ohomai Institute of Technology.

Regional campuses existed in Taupō, Tokoroa and Whakatāne, and formerly Tūrangi and Kawerau. These were backed by a variety of specialist campuses and buildings, such as the Waipa Campus just south of Rotorua and the newly established offerings available from Waiariki in the Tauranga suburb of Windermere.

Waiariki was divided into three faculties, which offered masters, graduate, postgraduate and degree qualifications, as well as diplomas and certificates in several subject areas. They were the Faculty of Applied Technology and Primary Industries - Te Kura Takawāo, the Faculty of Business, Information Technology and Creative Arts - Te Kura Taki, and Te Pākaro a Ihenga: Faculty of Health, Education and Humanities.

Qualification subject areas included nursing, teaching, social work, art, sustainability, Māori, forestry, business, computing, tourism and hospitality. These were backed by an equally diverse range of trade-based qualifications, in areas such as engineering, agriculture, horticulture, fashion, carpentry and hairdressing.

== Tangatarua Marae ==
Waiariki has an on-site marae named Tangatarua, which translates as "two peoples" to reflect their bicultural nature. Tangatarua Marae was officially opened on 5 October 1996 and is named after a Te Arawa ancestor, Ihenga, who lived on the land where the Mokoia Campus is today.

== Academies ==
The Waiariki Academy of Sport offered talented athletes the opportunity to prioritise their sporting careers while gaining a tertiary education. Similarly, the Waiariki Academy of Singing and Music supported talented young singers and musicians to reach their musical goals while studying.

Waiariki also offered teenagers interested in trade areas the Bay of Plenty Trades Academy, which allowed secondary students to get a taste of trade subjects and tertiary life while still at high-school.

== History ==
Waiariki Community College was born in 1976, after the Rotorua Boys’ High School Technical Institute Division was merged with the Rotorua Girls' High School Business College to form a Senior Technical Division under the Rotorua High Schools' Board of Governors. Building on the Mokoia Drive site commenced that year, and the Waiariki Community College was opened two years later on 1 April 1978.

Tokoroa's 'outpost' opened in 1973, and subsequently became Waiariki's first regional campus in 1978.

By the time Waiariki Community College changed its name to Waiariki Polytechnic in 1987, it was the largest polytechnic outside of the main city centres. The first two degree-level qualifications in tourism management and nursing were launched in 1995, and three years later, the name finally changed to Waiariki Institute of Technology.

== See also ==
- List of forestry universities and colleges
