= International Perspectives in Psychology: Research, Practice, Consultation =

- Discipline: Psychology
- Language: English
- Edited by: Stuart Carr

Publication details
- History: 2011-present
- Publisher: American Psychological Association (USA)
- Frequency: Quarterly

Standard abbreviations
- ISO 4: Int. Perspect. Psychol.

Indexing
- ISSN: 2157-3883 (print); 2157-3891 (web)

Links
- Journal homepage; Online access

International Perspectives in Psychology: Research, Practice, Consultation is a peer-reviewed academic journal published by Division 52 of the American Psychological Association. It was established in 2011 and covers research in the psychology of "human behavior and experiences around the globe." The current editor-in-chief is Stuart Carr of Massey University.
