= Tikanga Māori =

Māori customary tradition

Tikanga is a Māori term for practices, customary law, attitudes and principles. Te Aka Māori Dictionary defines it as "customary system of values and practices that have developed over time and are deeply embedded in the social context". More broadly, tikanga has often been defined as a concept incorporating practices and values from mātauranga Māori, or Māori knowledge. Tikanga is translated into the English language with a wide range of meanings— culture, custom, ethic, etiquette, fashion, formality, lore, manner, meaning, mechanism, method, protocol, and style.

== Opinions ==
Māori scholar Hirini Moko Mead states that tikanga can be viewed from several perspectives. One view is that tikanga Māori 'controls interpersonal relationships' as it guides the interactions of meetings, and provides identity to individuals. Another view is through ethics, that tikanga Māori is a practised code of conduct. The word tikanga is derived from the Māori word tika meaning 'right' or 'correct' so it follows that it involves moral judgements about what is the right way of doing something. Speaking on the pertinence of tikanga as a legitimate legal system, scholar Carwyn Jones has argued that the Treaty of Waitangi "was signed within the context of Māori legal systems", and that tikanga is inextricably linked to the concept of mana.

Scholars of Māori legal history view tikanga as having once been the law of the land. Lawyers view contemporary tikanga Māori through the lens of customary law, which comes from an authority rather than a normative system. This is being tested in the New Zealand judicial system through a few legal cases. For an interpretation of the conflicts between Tikanga Māori and Western/Pākehā jurisprudence, see the case of the burial of James Takamore (2011). In the course of her judgement on that case, Chief Justice of New Zealand Sian Elias stated that "Māori custom according to tikanga is... part of the values of the New Zealand common law." Justice Joe Williams has written and studied tikanga and the New Zealand law. In his future vision, there is a phase "when tikanga Māori fuses with New Zealand’s common law tradition to form a hybrid law of Aotearoa that could be developed by judges, case by base."

From about the 1980s, the word tikanga began to appear in common New Zealand English. This can be attributed to the Māori renaissance as well as acts of the New Zealand government including the Treaty of Waitangi Act 1975 and the Resource Management Act (1991) that include the need for separate consultation with local iwi (tribal) representatives.

In March 2001, the New Zealand Law Commission released a report on the influence of tikanga Māori on Pākehā (English) law conventions.

On 2 July 2011, the Waitangi Tribunal released its report into the Wai 262 claim, Ko Aotearoa Tēnei ("This is Aotearoa (New Zealand)"). The report considers more than 20 Government departments and agencies and makes recommendations as to reforms of "laws, policies or practices relating to health, education, science, intellectual property, indigenous flora and fauna, resource management, conservation, the Māori language, arts and culture, heritage, and the involvement of Māori in the development of New Zealand’s positions on international instruments affecting indigenous rights." The second volume of the report contains a glossary of te reo Māori terms, including:

- tikanga: traditional rules for conducting life, custom, method, rule, law
- tikanga Māori: Māori traditional rules, culture

An example of applied tikanga is an approach by Māori weavers in the gathering of traditional materials such as harakeke. One tikanga is to never cut the inside leaves of the plant, the names of these leaves are the rito and this is metaphorically linked to growth of humans. Practically it ensures the life cycle of the plant, that the harvesting of the fibre does not kill the plant and it also connects the value of the resource to the people that use it.

== See also ==
- Taha Māori
- Māori culture
- Māoritanga
