= Tangihanga =

Māori funeral rite

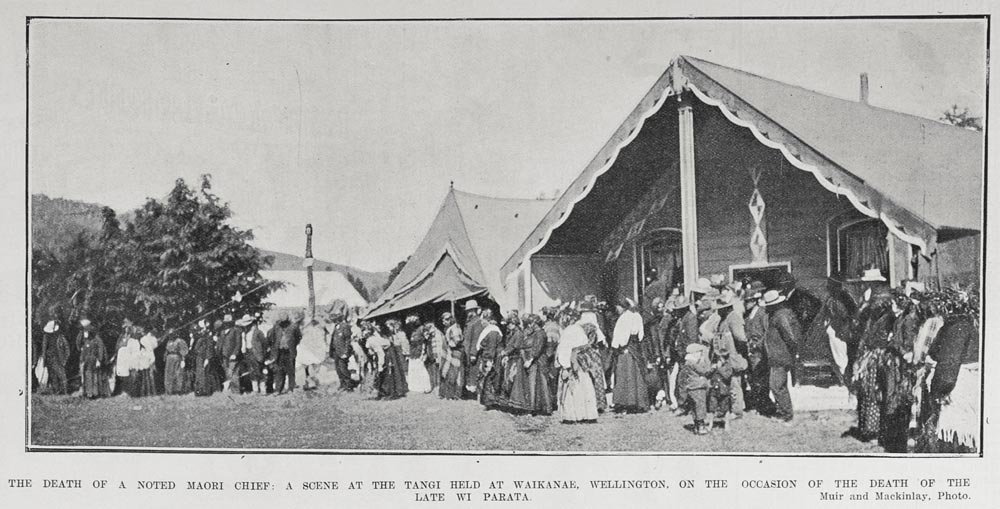
Tangihanga for Wi Parata at Waikanae, 1906

Tangihanga, or more commonly, tangi, is a traditional funeral rite practised by the Māori people of New Zealand. Tangi were traditionally held on marae, or place seen as sacred, and are still strongly associated with the tribal grounds, but are now also held at homes and funeral parlours. While still widely practised, tangi are not universally observed, and some tribes have expressed concerns about lower numbers of tangi.

== Modern practices ==
Tribes—at the level of iwi or hapū—differ in how they honour those who die. Tangihanga generally take three days, with burial on the third day. From the moment of death, the body of the deceased (tūpāpaku) is rarely alone. The tūpāpaku is transported (usually from a hospital and via a funeral home) to the marae. There they are welcomed with a ceremony called pōwhiri. They will lie in state for at least two nights, usually in an open coffin, in the wharenui, or communal building.

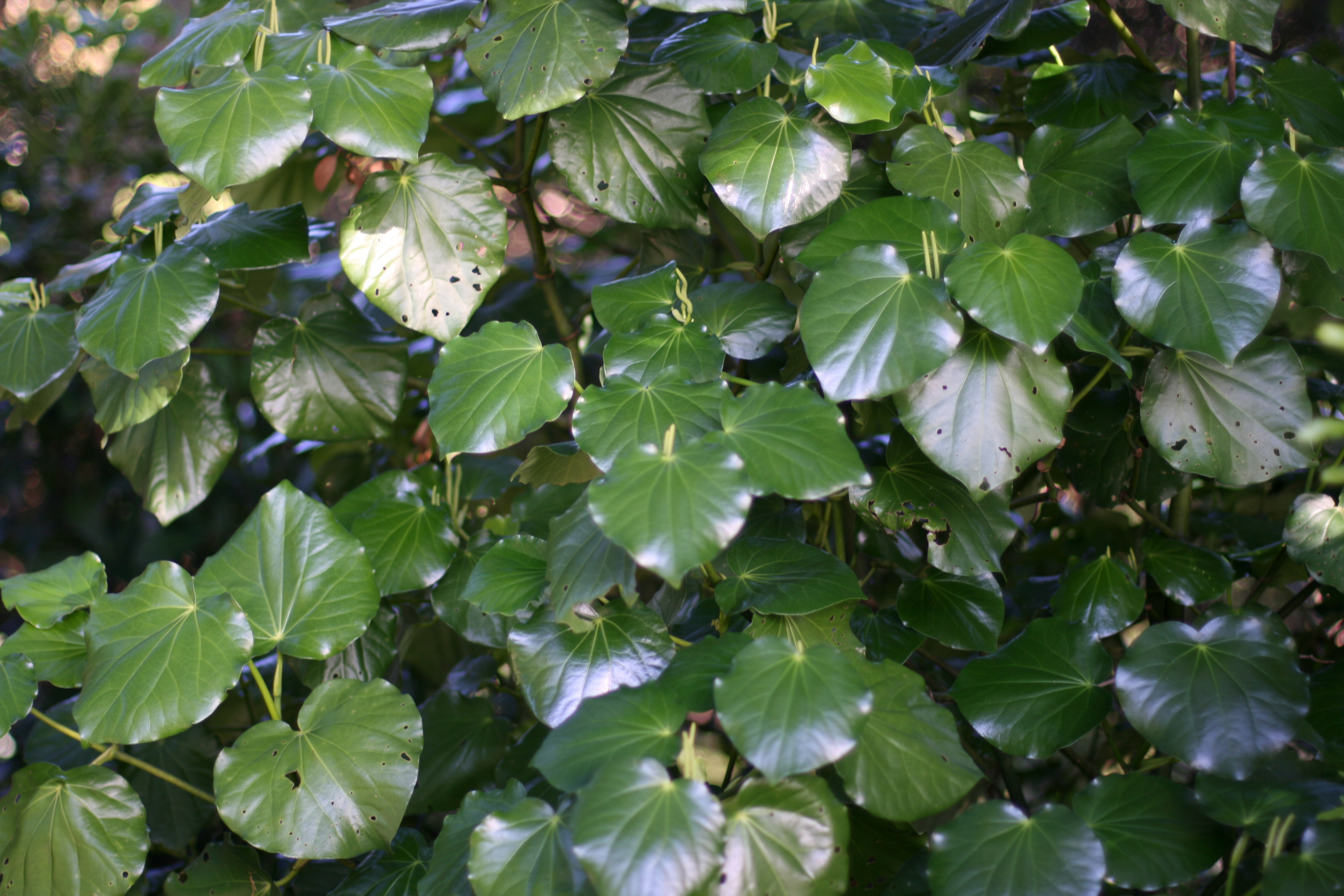
Kawakawa leaves

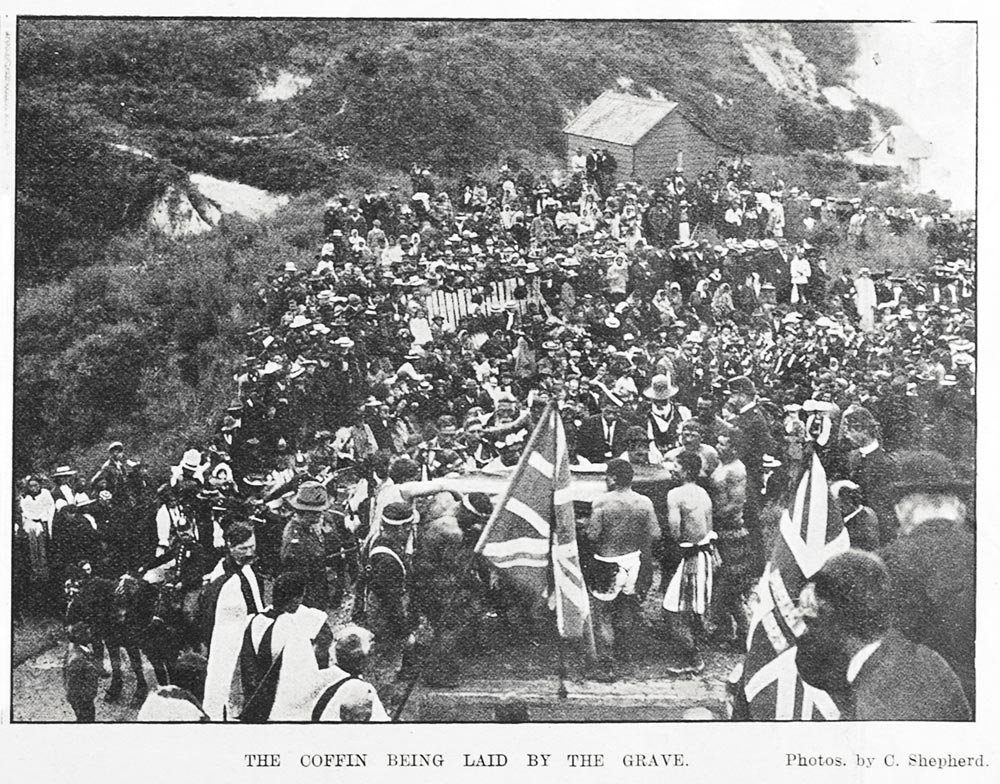
Burial of Major Te Keepa Te Rangi-pūawhe at Rotorua, 1905

Throughout the tangihanga, the tūpāpaku is flanked by the bereaved family (whānau pani; sometimes called the kirimate or mourners), who take few and short breaks, dress in black, and sometimes wreath their heads in kawakawa leaves. Around the coffin, flowers and photographs of deceased relatives are placed.

Visitors come during the day, sometimes from great distances despite only a distant relationship, to address the deceased. They may speak frankly of his or her faults as well as virtues, but singing and joking are also appropriate. Free expression of grief by both men and women is encouraged. Traditional beliefs may be invoked, and the deceased is told to return to the ancestral homeland, Hawaiki, by way of te rerenga wairua, the spirits' journey. The close kin may not speak. It is traditional for mourners to wash their hands in water and sprinkle some on their heads before leaving the area where the tūpāpaku lies in state.

Traditionally, the visitors would bring famous taonga (treasures), such as kākā and kiwi feather cloaks and pounamu mere, which would be placed alongside the tūpāpaku. These items were inherited by the heirs of the deceased, who were then expected to return them to the original owners at subsequent tangihanga. This practice was called kōpaki.

On the last night, the pō whakamutunga ('night of ending'), the mourners hold a vigil and at a time assigned by custom (sometimes midnight, sometimes sunrise) the coffin is closed, before a church or marae funeral service or graveside interment ceremony, invariably Christian in modern times. As with the area the tūpāpaku lies, it is traditional for mourners to wash their hands in water and sprinkle some on their heads before leaving the cemetery. After the burial rites are completed, a feast (hākari) is traditionally served. Mourners are expected to provide koha ('gifts', typically money) towards the meal. After the burial, the home of the deceased and the place where the deceased died are ritually cleansed with karakia (prayers or incantations) and desanctified with food and drink, in a ceremony called takahi whare, 'tramping the house'. That night, the pō whakangahau ('night of entertainment') is a night of relaxation and rest. The widow or widower is not left alone for several nights following.

Both in traditional times and modern, the tangi of high-profile individuals can be both extended and elaborate.

A 2011 court case over a disputed resting place ruled that Māori customary law could not be applied to funeral traditions under common law, as the customary law allows force to settle legal disputes.
