= Whānau =

Māori language word for extended family

Whānau (Māori pronunciation: [ˈfɐːnɐʉ̯]) is the Māori word for the basic extended family group. Within Māori society the whānau encompasses three or four generations and forms the political unit below the levels of hapū (subtribe), iwi (tribe or nation) and waka (migration canoe). These steps are emphasised in Māori genealogy as a person's whakapapa.

== Early Māori society ==
In pre-contact Māori tribal organisation, the whānau historically comprised a family spanning three to four generations, and would number around 20 to 30 people. It formed the smallest partition of the Māori society.

The kaumātua (tribal elders), senior adults (pākeke) such as parents, uncles and aunts, and the sons and daughters together with their partners and children. Large whānau lived in their own compound in the pā. Whānau also had their own gardening plots and their own fishing and hunting spots. The whānau was economically self-sufficient. In warfare, it supported and was necessarily supported by the iwi (tribe) or hapū (sub-tribe).

The whānau would look after children and grandchildren collectively, so the loss of a parent was less likely to be devastating to a child's upbringing. In the case of orphaned children, the child would be taken in by the process of whāngai adoption. This form of adoption is still practised and has some legal codification in New Zealand.

== Contemporary conceptions ==
Contemporary conceptions offer whānau in one of two ways:

1. An "object or construction based on descent, cause or a mix of the two"; or
2. "A collection of ideas".

As a descent construct, whānau has been variably described as 'extended family', 'extended family or community', or simply 'family'.

== See also ==
- Ohana (Hawaiian equivalent)
