= Joseph Bulbulia =

New Zealand professor of psychology

Joseph A. Bulbulia is a professor of psychology in the Faculty of Science at Victoria University of Wellington (2020–present). He was the Maclaurin Goodfellow Chair in the School of Humanities, Faculty of Arts at University of Auckland (2018–2020). He previously served as a professor in the School of Art History, Classics and Religious Studies at Victoria University of Wellington (2000–2017). Bulbulia is regarded as one of the founders of the contemporary evolutionary religious studies. He is a past president of the International Association for the Cognitive Science of Religion and is currently co-editor of Religion, Brain & Behavior. Bulbulia is one of four on the Senior Management Team of the New Zealand Attitudes and Values Study, a national longitudinal study started in 2009 that has repeatedly sampled over 45,000 New Zealanders. He is an associate investigator for Pulotu, a database of 116 Pacific cultures purpose-built to investigate the evolutionary dynamics of religion. In 2016 Bulbulia won a Research Excellence Award at Victoria University.

== Career ==
Bulbulia's early work explained how features of religious beliefs and emotions make people more predictably cooperative with members of their group, and uncooperative with people regarded to be social threats. Later work quantified the effects of religion on social responses to test functional theories of religion.

== Life ==
Bulbulia was born in Buffalo, New York. He received his PhD from Princeton University in 2001.

== Awards and achievements ==
- 2023 Godin Prize from International Association for the Psychology of Religion (IAPR)

-This international award is presented once every four years for outstanding contributions to the psychology of religion. The award, established by Andre Godin through the IAPR, recognises research of exceptional quality or authors who have significantly contributed to the progress of the Psychology of Religion as a scientific endeavour.

- 2016 Victoria University Research Excellence Award
- 2015 Co-editor, Religion Brain & Behavior
- 2014 President: International Association for the Cognitive Science of Religion
- 2013 Editorial Advisory Board: Zygon: Journal of Religion and Science
- 2011 Editorial Advisory Board: Journal of the Cognitive Science of Religion
- 2010–2012 Secretary General: International Association for the Cognitive Science of Religion
- 2010–2014 Editorial Advisory Board: Religion, Brain & Behavior
- 2010–2012 Advisor: The Adaptive Logic of Religious Belief and Behaviour Group
- 2006 Distinguished Fellow: Religion Cognition and Culture Group, Aarhus University
- 2006–2010 Executive Committee: International Association for the Cognitive Science of Religion
- 2006 Gæsteprofessor: Religion, Cognition, Culture Group: Aarhus University
- 2000 Faculty Fellowship, Stevenson Hall: Princeton University
- 1996–1999 Assistant Master, Stevenson Hall: Princeton University
- 1996 Melon Fellowship: Princeton University
- 1996 Bowen Merit Award: Princeton University

== Peer-reviewed publications ==
- Shaver, J. H.; Troughton, G.; Sibley, C. G.; Bulbulia, J. A. (2016). "Religion and the unmaking of prejudice toward Muslims: evidence from a large national sample". PLOS ONE. 11 (3) e0150209. Bibcode:2016PLoSO..1150209S. doi:10.1371/journal.pone.0150209. PMC 4784898. PMID 26959976.
- Watts, J.; Bulbulia, J.; Gray, R. D.; Atkinson, Q. D. (2016). "Clarity and causality needed in claims about Big Gods". Behavioral and Brain Sciences. 39: e27. doi:10.1017/s0140525x15000576. hdl:1885/112344. PMID 26948745. S2CID 1056522.
- Watts, J.; Sheehan, O.; Atkinson, Q. D.; Bulbulia, J.; Gray, R. D. (2016). "Ritual human sacrifice promoted and sustained the evolution of stratified societies". Nature. 532 (7598): 228–231. Bibcode:2016Natur.532..228W. doi:10.1038/nature17159. PMID 27042932. S2CID 4450246.
- Watts, J.; Greenhill, S. J.; Atkinson, Q. D.; Currie, T. E.; Bulbulia, J.; Gray, R. D. (2015). "Broad supernatural punishment but not moralizing high gods precede the evolution of political complexity in Austronesia. Proceedings of the Royal Society of London B". Biological Sciences. 282 (1804) 20142556. doi:10.1098/rspb.2014.2556. PMC 4375858. PMID 25740888.
- Botero, C. A.; Gardner, B.; Kirby, K. R.; Bulbulia, J.; Gavin, M. C.; Gray, R. D. (2014). "The ecology of religious beliefs". Proceedings of the National Academy of Sciences. 111 (47): 16784–16789. Bibcode:2014PNAS..11116784B. doi:10.1073/pnas.1408701111. PMC 4250141. PMID 25385605.
- Sibley, C. G.; Bulbulia, J. (2015). "Charity explains differences in life satis-faction between religious and secular New Zealanders". Religion, Brain & Be-havior. 5 (2): 91–100. doi:10.1080/2153599x.2014.899509. S2CID 144059478.
- Bulbulia, J. A., Shaver, J., Greaves, L., Sosis, R., and Sibley, C. G. (2015). Religion and parental cooperation: an empirical test of Slone's sexual signaling model. In Slone, D. and Van Slyke, J., editors, The Attraction of Religion: A Sexual Se-lectionist Account, chapter 2, pages 29–62. Bloomsbury Press. article doi:10.5040/9781472594617.ch-002
- Greaves, L.; Milojev, P.; Huang, Y.; Stronge, S.; Osborne, D.; Bulbulia, J.; Grim-shaw, M.; Sibley, C. (2015). "Regional differences in the psychological re-covery of Christchurch residents following the 2010/2011 earthquakes: A longi-tudinal study". PLOS ONE. 10 (5) e0124278. Bibcode:2015PLoSO..1024278G. doi:10.1371/journal.pone.0124278. PMC 4416916. PMID 25932919.
- Hoverd, W. J.; Bulbulia, J.; Partow, N.; Sibley, C. G. (2015). "Forecasting religious change: a Bayesian model predicting proportional Christian change in New Zealand". Religion, Brain & Behavior. 5 (1): 15–23. doi:10.1080/2153599x.2013.824497. S2CID 143223266.
- Satherley, N.; Milojev, P.; Greaves, L. M.; Huang, Y.; Osborne, D.; Bulbulia, J.; Sibley, C. G. (2015). "Demographic and psychological predictors of panel at-trition: Evidence from the New Zealand Attitudes and Values Study". PLOS ONE. 10 (3) e0121950. Bibcode:2015PLoSO..1021950S. doi:10.1371/journal.pone.0121950. PMC 4368421. PMID 25793746.
