= Whakapapa =

Genealogical concept in Māori culture

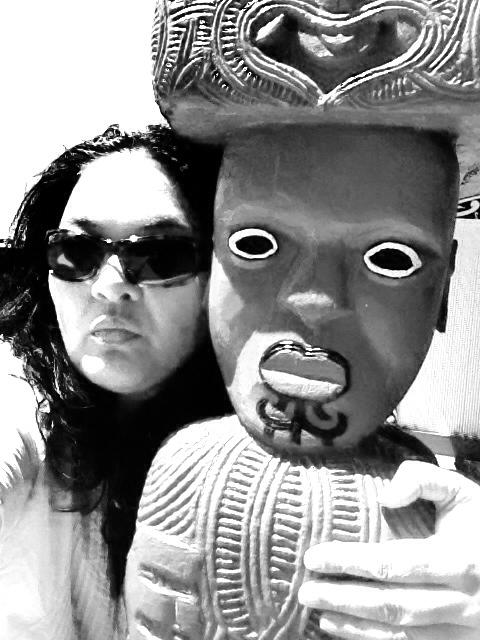
Māori woman with a representation of her ancestress Te Iringa in Waikato.

Whakapapa (Māori pronunciation: [ˈfakapapa], ['ɸa-], lit. 'layering') is a form of genealogy in Māori culture in and around New Zealand.

Reciting one's whakapapa proclaims one's identity among the Māori, places oneself in a wider context, and links oneself to land and tribal groupings and their mana.

Experts in whakapapa can trace and recite a lineage not only through the many generations in a linear sense, but also between such generations in a lateral sense.

== Link with ancestry ==
Raymond Firth, a New Zealand economist and anthropologist during the early 20th century, asserted there are four different levels of Māori kinship terminology:

Te reo Māori term	Literal Translation	Kingroup term
whānau	to give birth	extended family
hapū	pregnancy	ramage
iwi	bones; people	clan
waka	canoe	phratry

Some scholars have attributed this type of genealogical activity as being tantamount to ancestor worship. Most Māori would probably attribute this to ancestor reverence. Tribes and sub-tribes are mostly named after an ancestor (either male or female): for example, Ngāti Kahungunu means 'descendants of Kahungunu' (a famous chief who lived mostly in what is now called the Hawke's Bay region).

According to Atholl Anderson, "[the] intensely practical value of whakapapa that guaranteed their general accuracy". Ethnographer Walter Ong said of European dismissiveness of the accuracy of oral history like whakapapa: "Oral cultures must invest great energy in saying over and over again what has been learnt arduously over the ages".

== Word associations ==
Many physiological terms are also genealogical in 'nature'. For example, the terms 'iwi', 'hapū', and 'whānau' (as noted above) can also be translated in order as 'bones', 'pregnant', and 'give birth'. The prize-winning Māori author, Keri Hulme, named her best known novel as The Bone People: a title linked directly to the dual meaning of the word 'iwi as both 'bone' and 'tribal people'.

Most formal orations (or whaikōrero) begin with the "nasal" expression - Tihei Mauriora! This is translated as the 'Sneeze of Life'. In effect, the orator (whose 'sneeze' reminds us of a newborn clearing his or her airways to take the first breath of life) is announcing that 'his' speech has now begun, and that his 'airways' are clear enough to give a suitable oration.

== Whakapapa in the mental health system ==
Whakapapa is defined as the "genealogical descent of all living things from God to the present time. "Since all living things including rocks and mountains are believed to possess whakapapa, it is further defined as "a basis for the organisation of knowledge in the respect of the creation and development of all things".

Hence, whakapapa also implies a deep connection to land and the roots of one's ancestry. In order to trace one's whakapapa it is essential to identify the location where one's ancestral heritage began; "you can’t trace it back any further". "Whakapapa links all people back to the land and sea and sky and outer universe, therefore, the obligations of whanaungatanga extend to the physical world and all being in it".

While some family and community health organisations may require details of whakapapa as part of client assessment, it is generally better if whakapapa is disclosed voluntarily by whānau, if they are comfortable with this. Usually details of a client's whakapapa are not required since sufficient information can be obtained through their iwi identification. Cases where whakapapa may be required include adoption cases or situations where whakapapa information may be of benefit to the client's health and well-being.

Whakapapa is also believed to determine an individual's intrinsic tapu. "Sharing whakapapa enables the identification of obligations...and gaining trust of participants". Additionally, since whakapapa is believed to be "inextricably linked to the physical gene", concepts of tapu would still apply. Therefore, it is essential to ensure that appropriate cultural protocols are adhered to.

Misuse of such private and privileged information is of great concern to Māori. While whakapapa information may be disclosed to a kaimātai hinengaro in confidence, this information may be stored in databases that could be accessed by others. While most health professions are embracing technological advances of data storage, this may be an area of further investigation so that confidential information pertaining to a client's whakapapa cannot be disclosed to others.

Additionally, it may be beneficial to find out if the client is comfortable with whakapapa information being stored in ways that have the potential to be disclosed to others. To combat such issues, a Māori Code of Ethics has been suggested. A Māori Code of Ethics may prevent "the mismanagement or manipulation of either the information or the informants".

== Sport ==
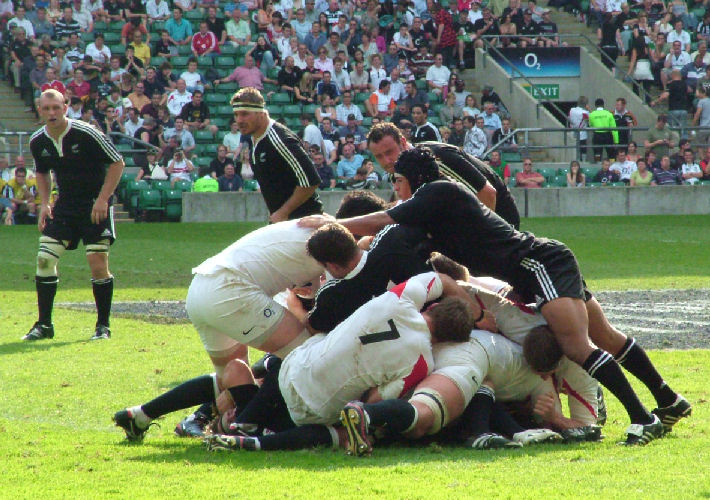
The New Zealand Māori rugby union team (in black) playing England Saxons in the 2007 Churchill Cup. Players now have to have their whakapapa verified.

Although this rule was not rigorously applied in the past, people today have to prove whakapapa to become members of the international Māori All Blacks rugby union team, New Zealand Māori rugby league team and New Zealand Māori cricket team to qualify.
