= Pākehā =

Māori term for non-Māori or White New Zealanders

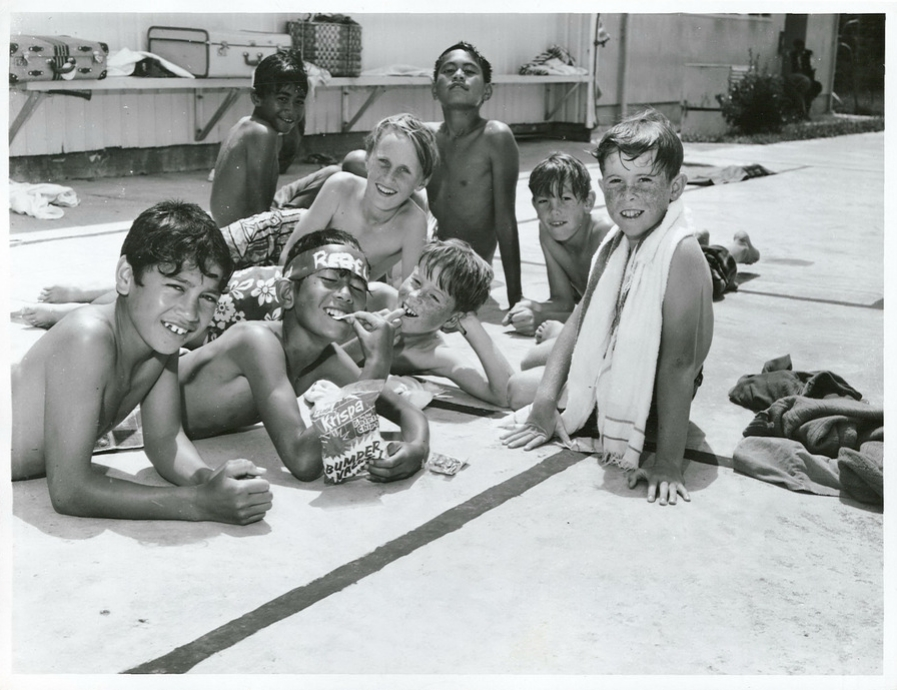
Māori and Pākehā boys at school swimming pool, Auckland, 1970

Pākehā or Pakeha (Note: /ˈpɑː.kɛ.hɑː, -.kiː.hɑː, -.kiː.ə/; Māori pronunciation: [ˈpaːkɛhaː]) is a Māori-language word used in English, particularly in New Zealand. It generally means a non-Polynesian New Zealander or more specifically a European New Zealander. It is not a legal term and has no definition under New Zealand law. Papa'a has a similar meaning in Cook Islands Māori.

== Etymology and history ==
The etymology of the Māori word Pākehā is uncertain. The most likely sources are the Māori words pākehakeha or pakepakehā, which refer to an oral tale of a "mythical, human like being, with fair skin and hair who possessed canoes made of reeds which changed magically into sailing vessels". When Europeans first arrived they rowed to shore in longboats, facing backwards:

We stayed at Whitianga and their ship arrived. Our elders saw their ship and said that it was a god and that the crew were goblins. The ship anchored and a boat started to row to shore. Our elders then said, "Indeed they are goblins as they have eyes in the backs of their heads. That is why they row with their backs to the shore."

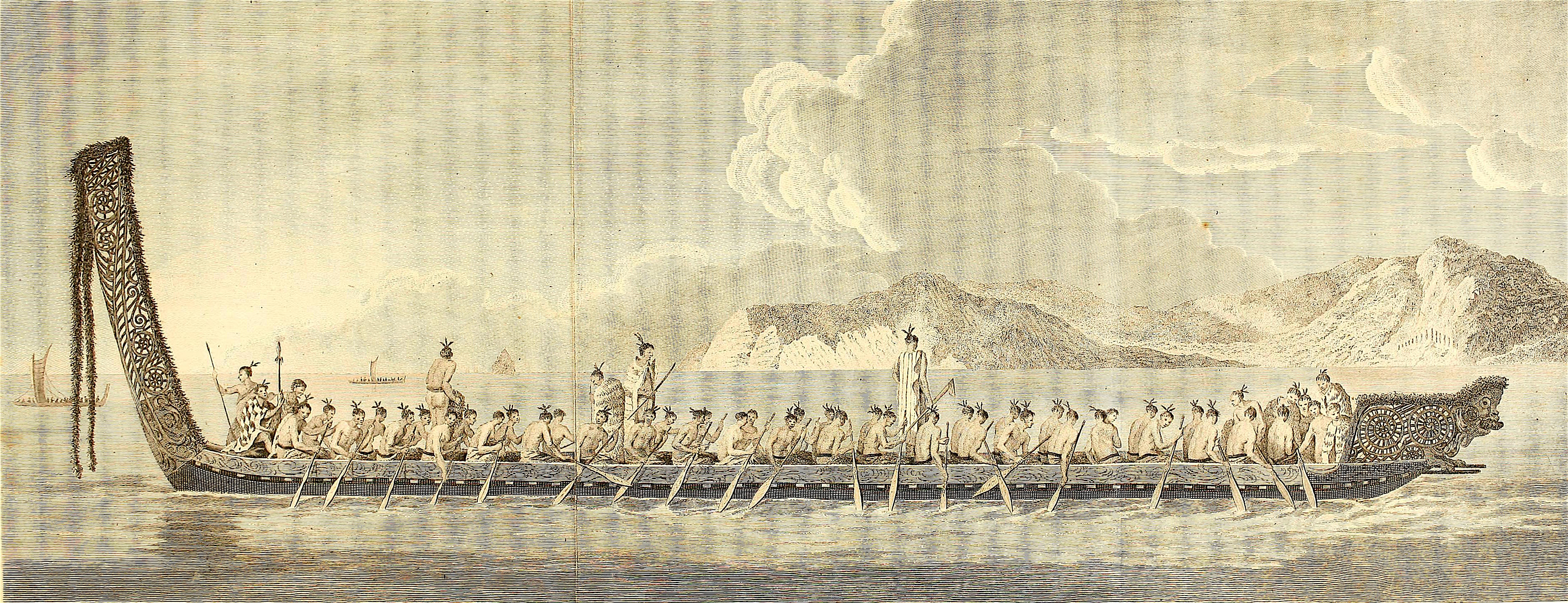
Drawing of a traditional waka showing Māori rowers facing forwards (1773)

In traditional Māori canoes or waka, paddlers face the direction of travel. This is supposed to have led to the belief by some, that the sailors were patupaiarehe (supernatural beings).

Pakepakehā is another word for patupaiarehe. It may have given rise to the term Pākehā (a New Zealander of European descent). To Māori, Europeans resembled the pakepakehā or patupaiarehe, with their fair skin and light-coloured hair.

There have been several dubious interpretations given to the word Pākehā. One claims that it derives from poaka, the Māori word for pig, and keha, one of the Māori words for flea, and therefore expresses derogatory implications. There is no etymological support for this notion—like all Polynesian languages, Māori is generally very conservative in terms of vowels; it would be extremely unusual for pā- to derive from poaka. The word poaka itself may come from the proto-Polynesian root puaka, known in every Polynesian language (puaka in Tongan, Uvean, Futunian, Rapa, Marquisian, Niuean, Rarotongan, Tokelauan, and Tuvaluan; it evolved to the later form puaʻa in Samoan, Tahitian, some Rapa dialects, and Hawaiian); or it might be borrowed or mixed with the English 'porker'. It is hard to say, since Polynesian peoples populated their islands bringing pigs with them from East Asia, but did not bring pigs to New Zealand. The more common Māori word for flea is puruhi. It is also sometimes claimed that Pākehā means 'white pig' or 'unwelcome white stranger'. However, no part of the word signifies 'pig', 'white', 'unwelcome', or 'stranger'.

The earliest known written record of the term is in a letter from William Hall on 15 June 1814, after he and Thomas Kendall had arrived at Rangihoua in the Bay of Islands on 10 June. When Hall told Māori there that he would build them large houses and fine canoes, they called him a "'Nuee nuee rungateeda pakehaa' [nui nui rangatira Pākehā] – a very great Gentleman white man". John Savage had visited the Bay of Islands in 1805 and Māori told him of a white man living there, but when Savage compiled a list of Māori words he heard during his visit, it did not include Pākehā. Historian Ormond Wilson thinks that if it had been in use at that time, Savage would have heard it. The earliest use of the term in a published work is on page 22 of Kendall's 1815 A Korao no New Zealand; or, the New Zealander's First Book, the first book written in Māori, where it is spelt Pakkahah.

== Meaning and use ==
The Oxford Dictionary of English (2011) defines 'Pakeha' as 'a white New Zealander'. The Oxford Dictionary of New Zealandisms (2010) defines the noun Pākehā as 'a light-skinned non-Polynesian New Zealander, especially one of British birth or ancestry as distinct from a Māori; a European or white person'; and the adjective as 'of or relating to Pākehā; non-Māori; European, white'.

Māori in the Bay of Islands and surrounding districts had no doubts about the meaning of the word in the 19th century. In 1831, thirteen rangatira from the Far North met at Kerikeri to compose a letter to King William IV, seeking protection from the French, "the tribe of Marion". Written in Māori, the letter used the word Pākehā to mean 'British European', and the words tau iwi to mean 'strangers (non-British)'—as shown in the translation that year of the letter from Māori to English by the missionary William Yate. To this day, the Māori term for the English language is reo Pākehā. Māori also used other terms such as tupua (supernatural, or object of fear, strange being), kēhua (ghosts), and maitai (metal or referring to persons foreign) to refer to some of the earliest visitors.

However, The Concise Māori Dictionary (Kāretu, 1990) defines the word Pākehā as 'foreign, foreigner (usually applied to white person)', while the English–Māori, Māori–English Dictionary (Biggs, 1990) defines it as 'white (person)'. Sometimes the term applies more widely to include all non-Māori. No Māori dictionary cites Pākehā as derogatory. Some early European settlers who lived among Māori and adopted aspects of Māoritanga became known as 'Pākehā Māori'.

In Māori, plural noun-phrases of the term include ngā Pākehā (the definite article) and he Pākehā (the indefinite article). When the word was first adopted into English, the usual plural was 'Pakehas'. However, speakers of New Zealand English are increasingly removing the terminal 's' and treating the term as a plural noun. There is also evidence Māori coined the term in the plural as well as in the singular on first encounter with Europeans:

When the Māori heard the soft and loud sounds of the language of Captain Cook and his sailors the Māori called them 'Pakepakehā', which was shortened to 'Pākehā'. The Māori created this name, which is still used. I tētahi whawhaitanga i muri mai, ka riro tētahi o ngā pū repo a te Pākehā i te Māori, nō muri mai ka tuomakia mai e tētahi Pākehā nō Amerika, he kaupoai (TP 7/1900:8). / In a later fight, one of the cannons of the Pākehā^{(plural)} was taken by the Māori, and later on, a Pākehā^{(singular)} from America, a cowboy, came hurrying up.

== Attitudes to the term ==
A survey of 6,507 New Zealanders in 2009 showed no support for the claim that it is associated with a negative evaluation; however, some reject it on the ground that they claim it is offensive, or they object to being named in a language other than their own. In 2013, the New Zealand Attitudes and Values Study carried out by the University of Auckland found no evidence that the word was widely considered to be derogatory; however, only 12 per cent of New Zealanders of European descent actively chose to be identified by the term, with the remainder preferring 'New Zealander' (53 per cent), 'New Zealand European' (25 per cent) or 'Kiwi' (17 per cent).

European New Zealanders vary in their attitudes toward the word when it is applied to themselves. Some embrace it while others object to the word, sometimes strongly, saying it is offensive or derogatory, carrying implications of being an outsider, although this is often based on false information about the meaning of the term. Some believe being labelled Pākehā compromises their status and their birthright links to New Zealand. In the 1986 census, over 36,000 respondents ignored the ethnicities offered, including Pākehā, writing-in their ethnicity as 'New Zealander', or ignoring the question completely. A joint response code of 'NZ European or Pakeha' was tried in the 1996 census, but was replaced by "New Zealand European" in later censuses because it drew what Statistics New Zealand described as a "significant adverse reaction from some respondents". Sociologist Paul Spoonley criticised the new version, saying that many Pākehā would not identify as European.

The term Pākehā is also sometimes used among New Zealanders of European ancestry in distinction to the Māori term tauiwi (foreigner), as an act of emphasising their claims of belonging to the space of New Zealand in contrast to more recent arrivals. Those who prefer to emphasise nationality rather than ethnicity in relating to others living in New Zealand may refer to all New Zealand citizens only as 'New Zealanders' or by the colloquial term 'Kiwis'.

Historian Judith Binney called herself a Pākehā and said, "I think it is the most simple and practical term. It is a name given to us by Māori. It has no pejorative associations like people think it does—it's a descriptive term. I think it's nice to have a name the people who live here gave you, because that's what I am." New Zealand writer and historian Michael King wrote in 1985: "To say something is Pakeha in character is not to diminish its New Zealand-ness, as some people imply. It is to emphasise it."

== See also ==
- Europeans in Oceania
- Old Stock Australians
- Old Stock Canadians
- Tangata tiriti
