= Ourauwhare River =

River in the Auckland Region, New Zealand

- Mouth of the Ourauwhare River Ourauwhare River (New Zealand)
- Route of the Ourauwhare River

Location
- Country: New Zealand
- Region: Auckland Region

Physical characteristics
- Source
  - coordinates: 36.6683°S 174.4695°E
- Mouth: Kaukapakapa River
  - coordinates: 36.6388°S 174.4613°E

Basin features
- Progression: Ourauwhare River → Kaukapakapa River → Kaipara River → Kaipara Harbour

The Ourauwhare River is a river of the Auckland Region of New Zealand's North Island. It is a tributary of the Kaukapakapa River, which it meets south of Helensville.

== See also ==
- List of rivers of New Zealand
