= Kaukapakapa =

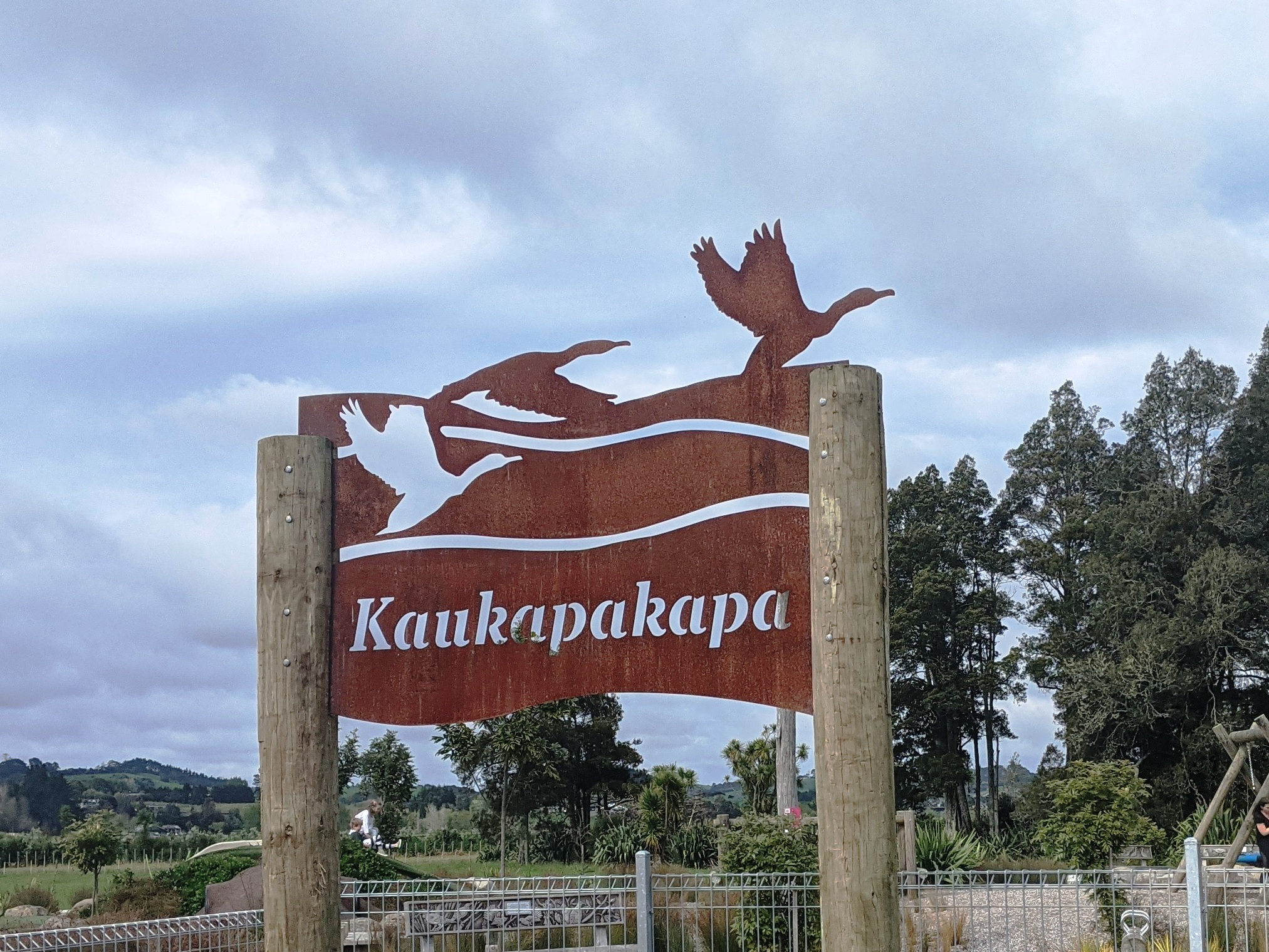
- Kaukapakapa sign
- Interactive map of Kaukapakapa
- Coordinates: 36°36′58″S 174°29′29″E
- Country: New Zealand
- Region: Auckland Region
- Ward: Rodney ward
- Community board: Rodney Local Board
- Subdivision: Kumeū subdivision
- Electorates: Kaipara ki Mahurangi; Te Tai Tokerau

Government
  - Territorial Authority: Auckland Council
  - Mayor of Auckland: Wayne Brown
  - Kaipara ki Mahurangi MP: Jessica Rowe
  - Te Tai Tokerau MP: TBD

Area
  - Total: 5.26 km^{2} (2.03 sq mi)

Population (June 2025)
  - Total: 1,140
  - Density: 217/km^{2} (561/sq mi)

Kaukapakapa is a town in the North Island of New Zealand. It is situated in the Rodney ward of the Auckland Region and is around 50 kilometres (31 mi) northwest of Auckland. State Highway 16 passes through the town, connecting it to Helensville about 12 kilometres (7.5 mi) to the south-west, and Araparera about 14 kilometres (8.7 mi) to the north. The North Auckland Line also passes through Kaukapakapa. The Kaukapakapa River flows from the town to the Kaipara Harbour to the west.

"Kaukapakapa" is a Māori name meaning "to swim with much splashing". The town is commonly known to the locals in its shortened form "Kaukap"; it is sometimes abbreviated to KKK.

== Geography ==
Kaukapakapa is located in western Rodney at the navigable headlands of the Kaukapakapa River, which flows into the Kaipara River. The town is located near Helensville and the Kaipara Harbour.

== History ==
European settlement of the area began in 1860, when the Government bought land from local Māori. A small number of settlers arrived from England and Scotland, and a Methodist church was built in 1872. A monthly boat service operated between Kaukapakapa and the northern Kaipara from 1863. The population of the area was 311 in 1881. The town developed split between the northern and southern banks of the river. Although roads connected the town to Riverhead, Tauhoa and Helensville by the early 1880s, they were of poor quality, and most access was by the river. The roads were still mostly unmetalled in 1920.

The kauri timber industry was responsible for developing the area, with logs floated down the Kaukapakapa River to the Kaipara Harbour, where they were loaded onto ships for export. Kauri gum digging (beginning in 1873-74 and continuing until at least 1914) and flax processing (in the 1880s) were also significant early industries. A shipyard operated from 1864 and into the 1880s.

The North Auckland railway line reached Kaukapakapa in 1889. A creamery was built next to the railway station to service the developing dairy industry. St Clement's Anglican Church was established at Kaukapakapa in 1919.

In 2008 Genesis Energy proposed building a gas-fired power station called Rodney Power Station near Kaukapakapa. Despite local opposition, the project was granted resource consent in 2009. The project was abandoned in 2015.

== Demographics ==
Statistics New Zealand describes Kaukapakapa as a rural settlement, which covers 5.26 km^{2} (2.03 sq mi) and had an estimated population of 1,140 as of June 2025, with a population density of 217 people per km^{2}. The settlement was part of the larger Te Kuru statistical area in the 2018 census.

Historical population for Kaukapakapa
Year	Pop.	±% p.a.
2006	540	—
2013	609	+1.73%
2018	876	+7.54%
2023	1,062	+3.93%

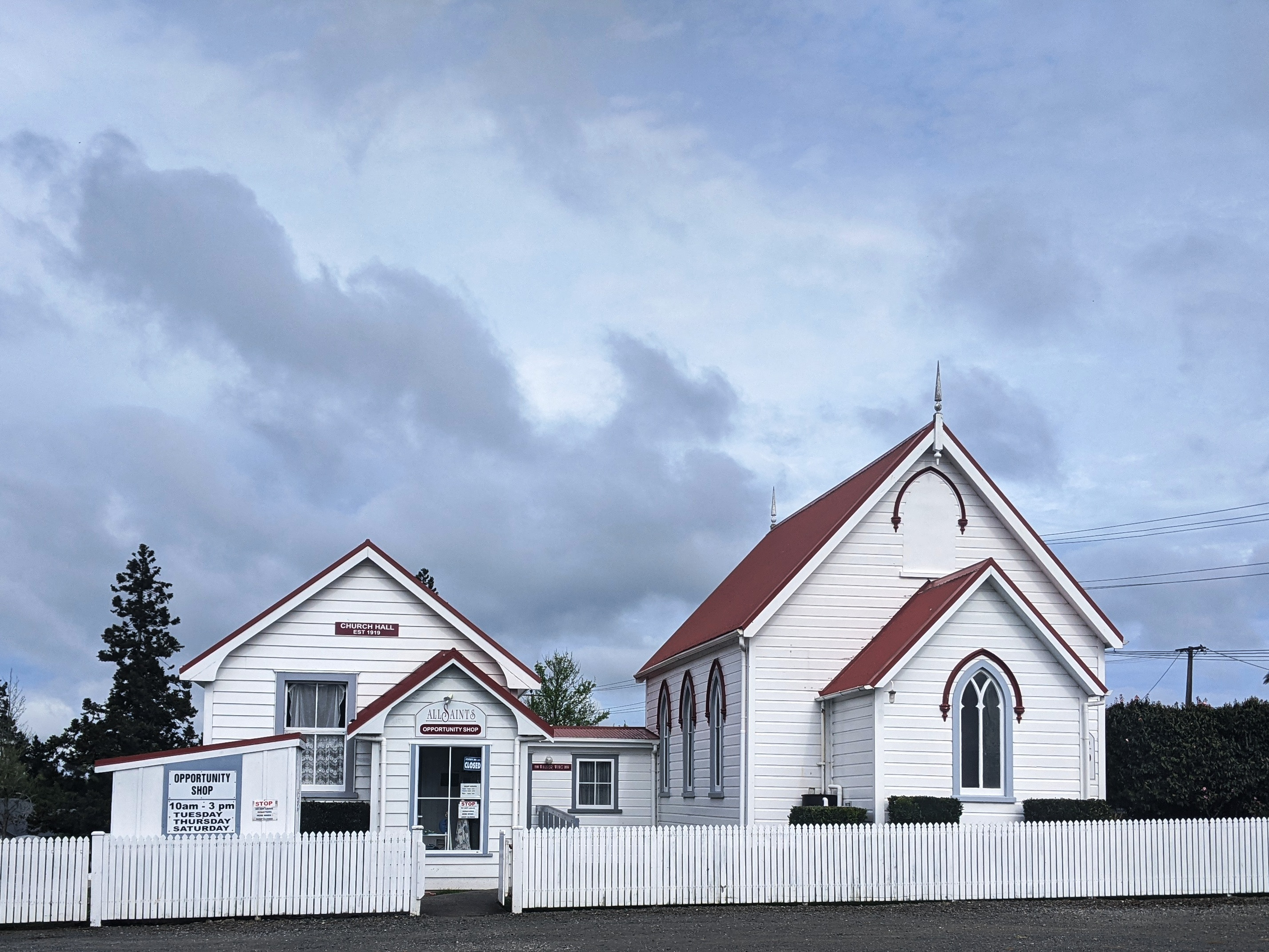
The All Saints Anglican Church in Kaukapakapa

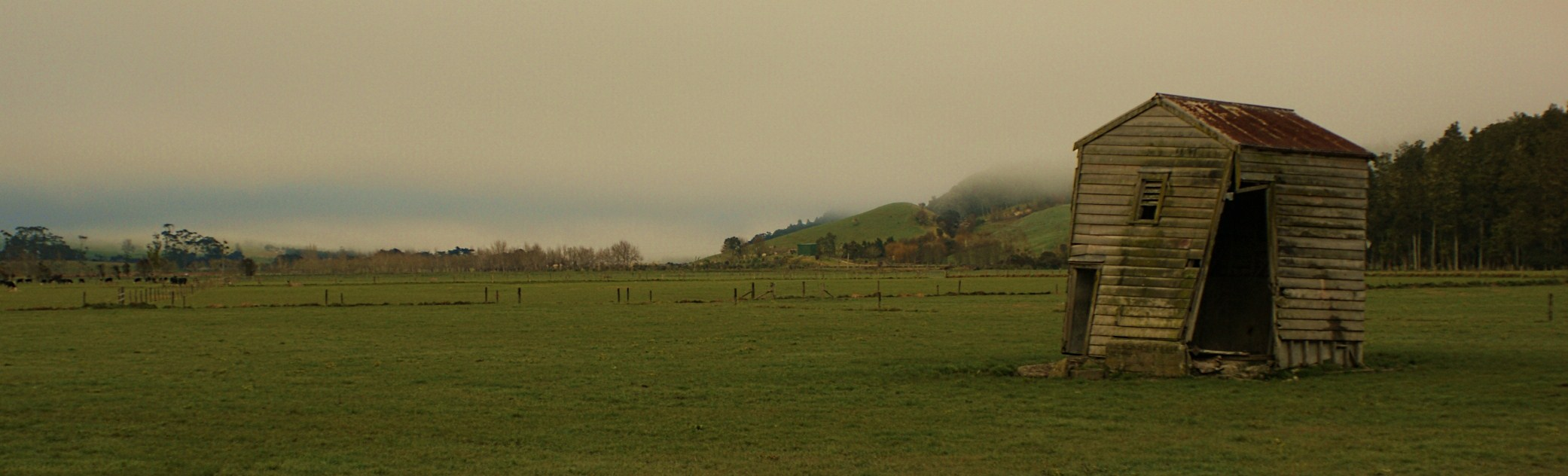
Dawn at the old slaughterhouse, Kaukapakapa

Kaukapakapa had a population of 1,062 in the 2023 New Zealand census, an increase of 186 people (21.2%) since the 2018 census, and an increase of 453 people (74.4%) since the 2013 census. There were 519 males, 540 females and 3 people of other genders in 330 dwellings. 3.1% of people identified as LGBTIQ+. The median age was 34.7 years (compared with 38.1 years nationally). There were 258 people (24.3%) aged under 15 years, 192 (18.1%) aged 15 to 29, 522 (49.2%) aged 30 to 64, and 96 (9.0%) aged 65 or older.

People could identify as more than one ethnicity. The results were 92.1% European (Pākehā); 8.8% Māori; 2.0% Pasifika; 5.1% Asian; 0.8% Middle Eastern, Latin American and African New Zealanders (MELAA); and 3.4% other, which includes people giving their ethnicity as "New Zealander". English was spoken by 96.3%, Māori language by 1.4%, Samoan by 0.3%, and other languages by 8.5%. No language could be spoken by 2.5% (e.g. too young to talk). New Zealand Sign Language was known by 0.8%. The percentage of people born overseas was 22.3, compared with 28.8% nationally.

Religious affiliations were 24.6% Christian, 0.3% Hindu, 0.3% Māori religious beliefs, 0.6% New Age, and 1.1% other religions. People who answered that they had no religion were 66.1%, and 6.2% of people did not answer the census question.

Of those at least 15 years old, 132 (16.4%) people had a bachelor's or higher degree, 492 (61.2%) had a post-high school certificate or diploma, and 138 (17.2%) people exclusively held high school qualifications. The median income was $54,200, compared with $41,500 nationally. 168 people (20.9%) earned over $100,000 compared to 12.1% nationally. The employment status of those at least 15 was that 471 (58.6%) people were employed full-time, 138 (17.2%) were part-time, and 15 (1.9%) were unemployed.

=== Kaukapakapa Rural ===
Kaukapakapa Rural statistical area covers 90.83 km^{2} (35.07 sq mi) to the west, north and east of the town. It had an estimated population of 1,870 as of June 2025, with a population density of 21 people per km^{2}.

Historical population for Kaukapakapa Rural
Year	Pop.	±% p.a.
2006	1,695	—
2013	1,464	−2.07%
2018	1,704	+3.08%
2023	1,770	+0.76%
The 2006 population is for a smaller area of 80.93 km^{2} called Te Kuru, which included Kaukapakapa town. Source:

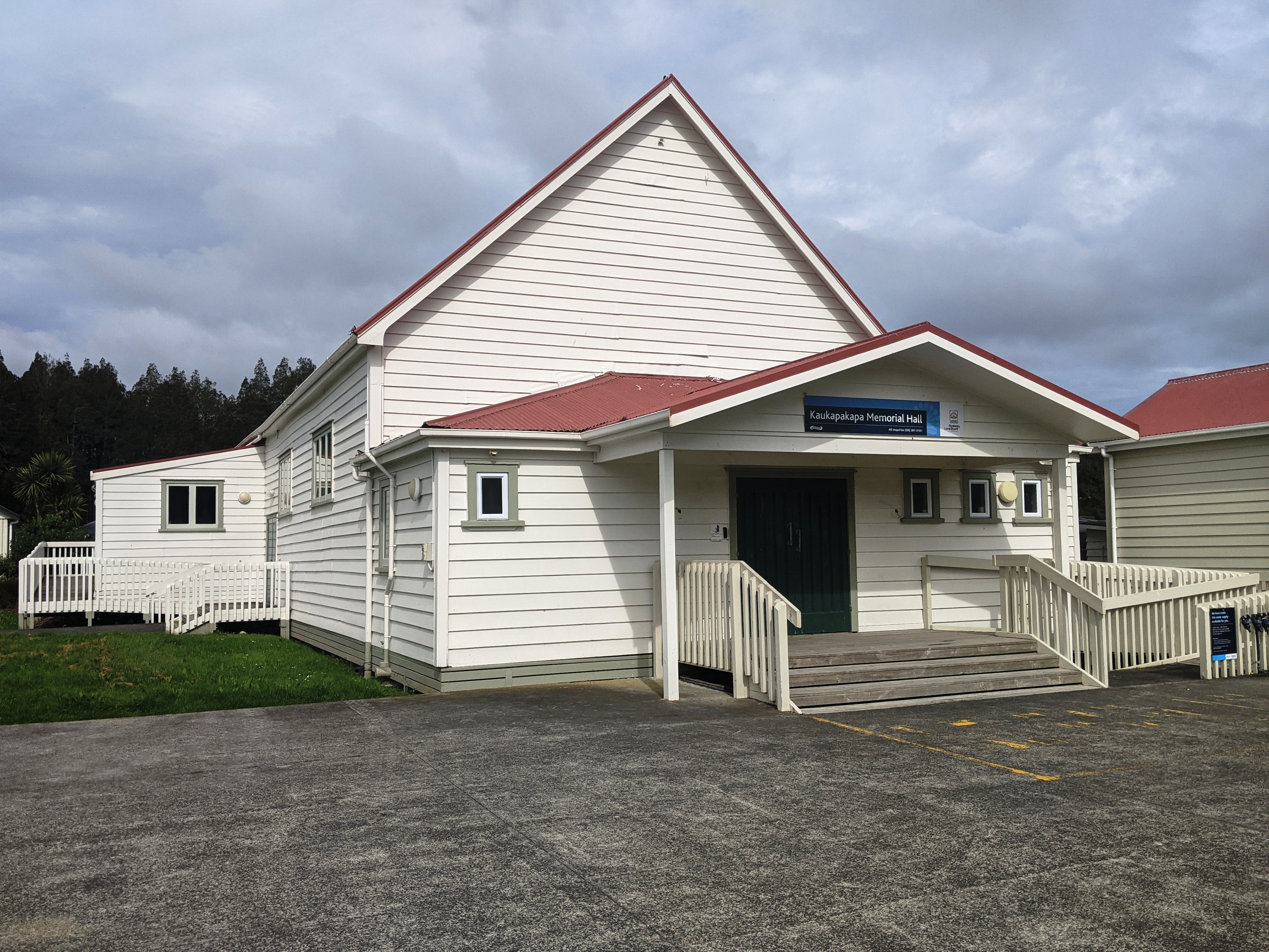
Kaukapakapa Memorial Hall

Kaukapakapa Rural had a population of 1,770 in the 2023 New Zealand census, an increase of 66 people (3.9%) since the 2018 census, and an increase of 306 people (20.9%) since the 2013 census. There were 897 males, 864 females and 6 people of other genders in 591 dwellings. 2.7% of people identified as LGBTIQ+. The median age was 42.7 years (compared with 38.1 years nationally). There were 363 people (20.5%) aged under 15 years, 264 (14.9%) aged 15 to 29, 891 (50.3%) aged 30 to 64, and 252 (14.2%) aged 65 or older.

People could identify as more than one ethnicity. The results were 93.9% European (Pākehā); 11.2% Māori; 3.6% Pasifika; 2.5% Asian; 1.0% Middle Eastern, Latin American and African New Zealanders (MELAA); and 2.7% other, which includes people giving their ethnicity as "New Zealander". English was spoken by 97.8%, Māori language by 1.9%, Samoan by 0.2%, and other languages by 6.4%. No language could be spoken by 1.9% (e.g. too young to talk). New Zealand Sign Language was known by 0.3%. The percentage of people born overseas was 21.2, compared with 28.8% nationally.

Religious affiliations were 27.8% Christian, 0.2% Hindu, 0.8% Māori religious beliefs, 0.3% Buddhist, 0.5% New Age, and 0.5% other religions. People who answered that they had no religion were 62.7%, and 7.1% of people did not answer the census question.

Of those at least 15 years old, 228 (16.2%) people had a bachelor's or higher degree, 828 (58.8%) had a post-high school certificate or diploma, and 255 (18.1%) people exclusively held high school qualifications. The median income was $48,700, compared with $41,500 nationally. 258 people (18.3%) earned over $100,000 compared to 12.1% nationally. The employment status of those at least 15 was that 789 (56.1%) people were employed full-time, 216 (15.4%) were part-time, and 21 (1.5%) were unemployed.

== Governance ==
Kaukapakapa was first governed by the Kaukapakapa Road Board, established 5 October 1868. In 1875 both Kaukapakapa North and Kaukapakapa South road districts were listed but by 1876 only the Kaukapakapa Road District was listed. In 1881 the residents voted to join Rodney County. In 1921 the road district was dissolved.

Kaukapakapa was originally part of the Kaukapakapa riding of Rodney County until the county was abolished in 1989 and it became part of the new Rodney District Council.

Kaukapakapa is part of the local government Rodney Ward of Auckland Council and is part of the Kumeu subdivision of the Rodney Local Board.

Kaukapakapa is in the Kaipara ki Mahurangi parliamentary electorate.

== Economy ==
The township is in the North West Country Inc business improvement district zone. The business association which represents businesses from Kaukapakapa to Riverhead.

== Education ==
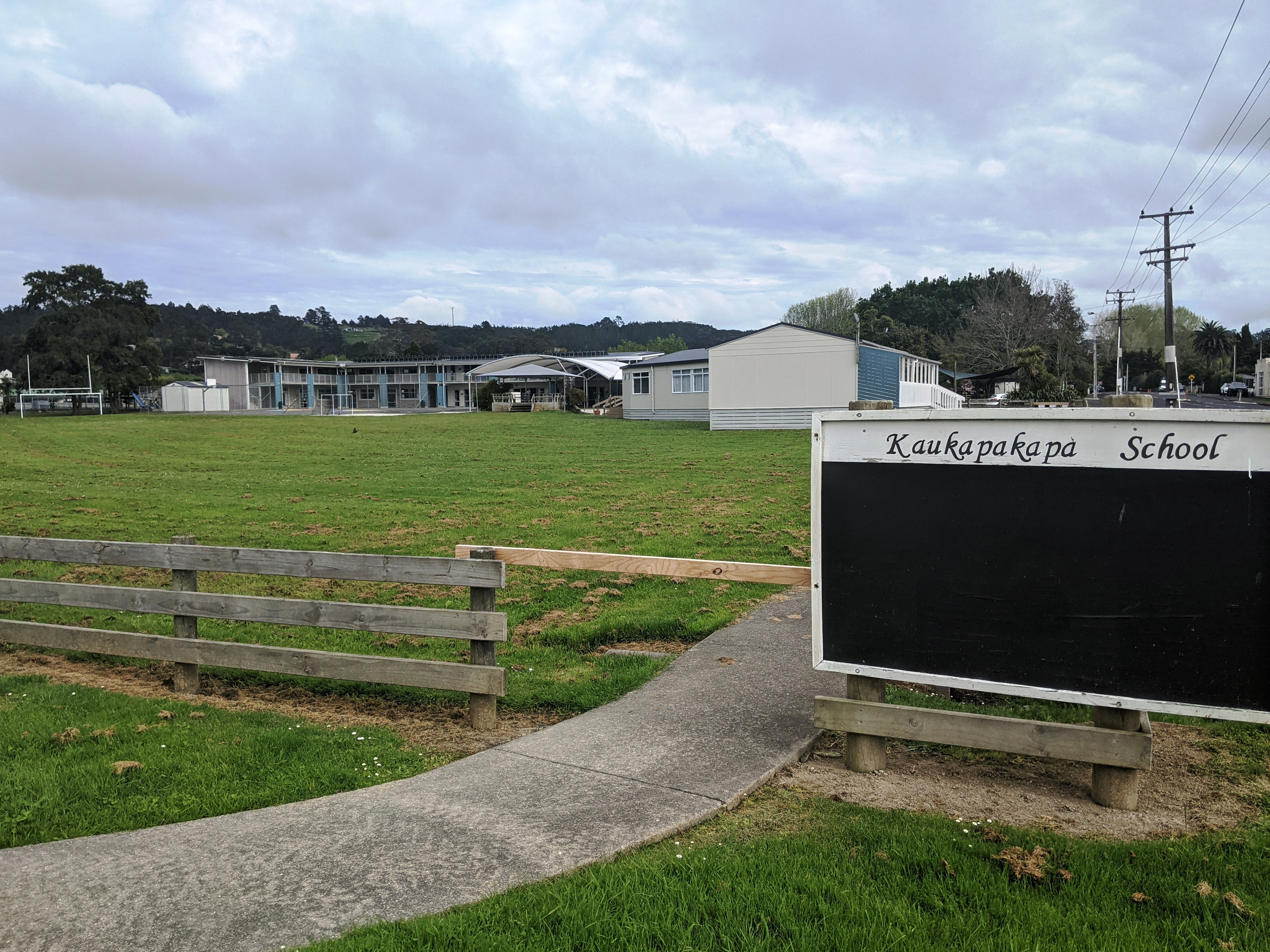
Kaukapakapa School

Kaukapakapa School is a coeducational full primary school (years 1–8), with a roll of 250 students as of July 2026. It opened in 1873.

Kaukapakapa also has two early learning institutions: The Kaukapakapa Pre-School, located near the primary school, and a Playcentre located in Macky Road. (Established in 1976)

== Publications ==
Kaukapakapa's only local publication dedicated to Kaukapakapa news and events is the Kaukapakapa Kourier, a free newsletter delivered to local residents by post and also available online in PDF format.

== Notable people ==
- Alan Gibbs - businessman and art collector.
- Tony Woodcock – former All Black rugby player

== Amenities ==
The Omeru Scenic Reserve is located north of Kaukapakapa, at the confluence of the Omeru Stream and Waitangi Stream. The reserve was gifted to Auckland by Basil Orr in 1971, and features a number of waterfalls, including the Omeru Falls and Waitangi Falls. The site of the Omeru pā can be found within the reserve.

== Bibliography ==
- Ryburn, Wayne (1999). Tall Spars, Steamers & Gum. Auckland, N.Z.: Kaipara Publications. ISBN 0-473-06176-7.
