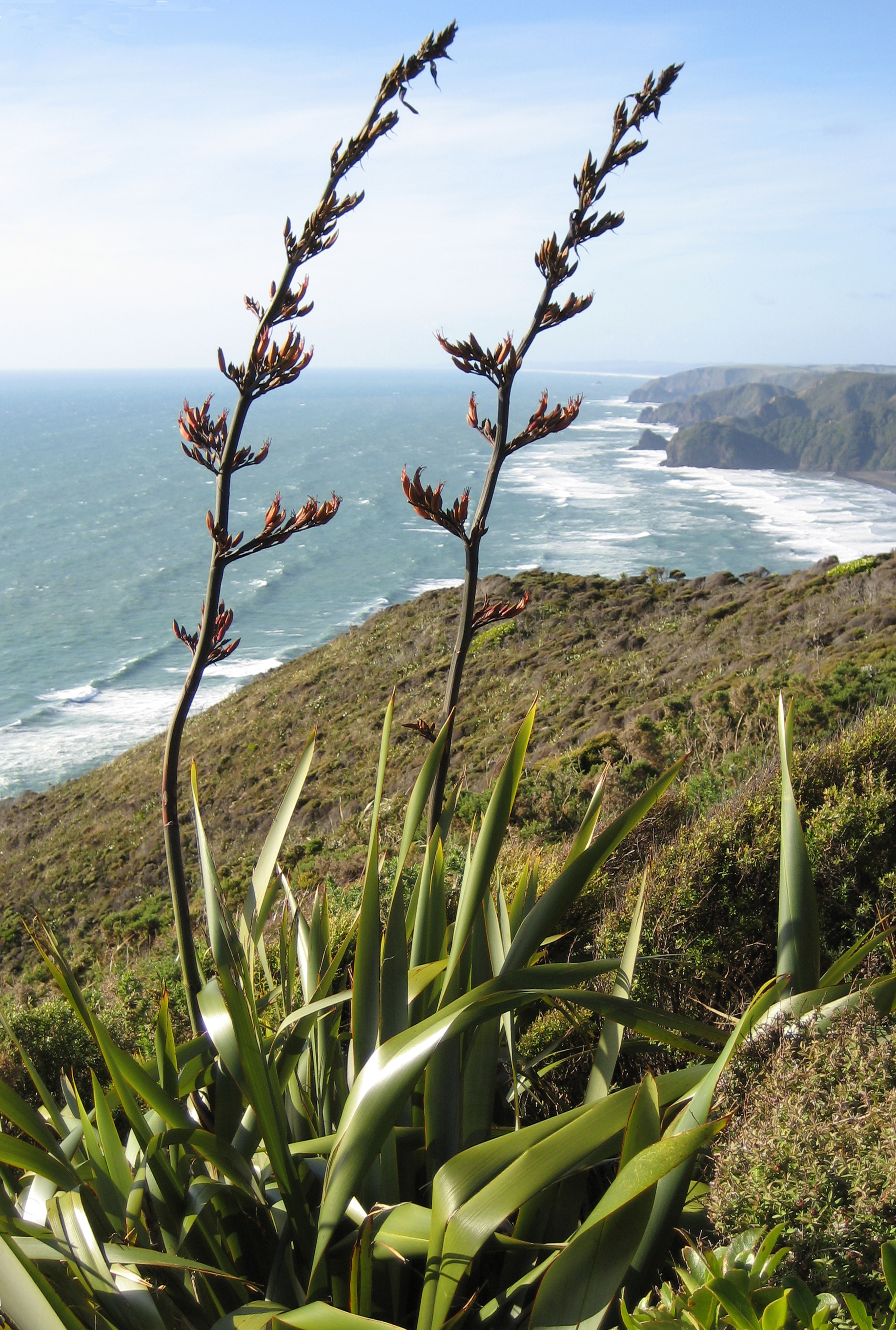
- Phormium tenax in bloom in Piha, West Auckland, New Zealand

Scientific classification
- Kingdom: Plantae
- Clade: Tracheophytes
- Clade: Angiosperms
- Clade: Monocots
- Order: Asparagales
- Family: Asphodelaceae
- Subfamily: Hemerocallidoideae
- Genus: Phormium; J.R. Forst. & G. Forst.

Type species
- Phormium tenax

Species
- Phormium colensoi; Phormium tenax

= Phormium =

New Zealand flax

Genus of flowering plants

Phormium is a genus of two plant species in the family Asphodelaceae. One species is endemic to New Zealand and the other is native to New Zealand and Norfolk Island. The two species are widely known in New Zealand as flax or their Māori names wharariki and harakeke respectively, and elsewhere as New Zealand flax or flax lily, but they are not closely related to the Northern Hemisphere's flax (Linum usitatissimum), which is native to the region extending from the eastern Mediterranean to India and has been used by humans since 30,000 B.C.

== Taxonomy ==
Monocot classification has undergone significant revision in the past decade, and recent classification systems (including the Angiosperm Phylogeny Group) have found Phormium to be closely related to daylilies (Hemerocallis), placing it in family Asphodelaceae, subfamily Hemerocallidoideae. Phormium formerly belonged to the family Agavaceae and many classification systems still place it there. It includes two species and many cultivars.

=== Species ===
Flower	Plant	Name	Distribution
		Phormium colensoi Hook.f.	New Zealand (South Island, North Island)
		Phormium tenax J.R.Forst. & G.Forst.	New Zealand and Norfolk Island.

The genus was originally established by the German naturalists Johann Reinhold Forster and his son Georg Forster in 1775 from specimens of Phormium tenax collected by both Forsters and the Swedish naturalist Anders Erikson Sparrman. All of them were part of the second expedition of Captain James Cook aboard the Resolution (1772–1775). The type specimens were taken from Queen Charlotte Sound, with additional specimens from both Norfolk Island and North Island, New Zealand. The name Phormium comes from Ancient Greek for a "basket", while tenax is a Latin adjective meaning "holding fast, tenacious".

== Description and ecology ==
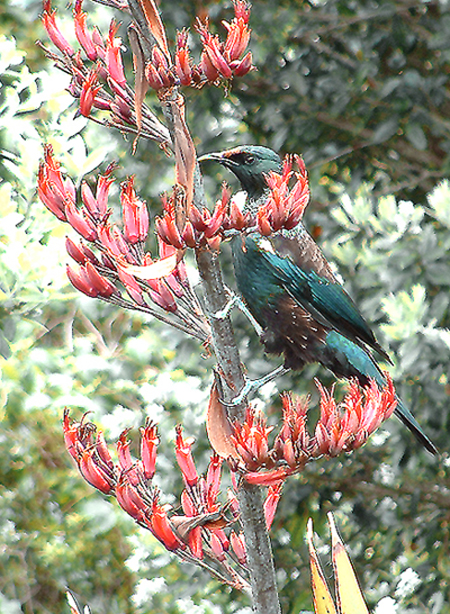
Phormium tenax flowers have the same curvature as the beak of the nectar-eating tūī seen in the photograph.

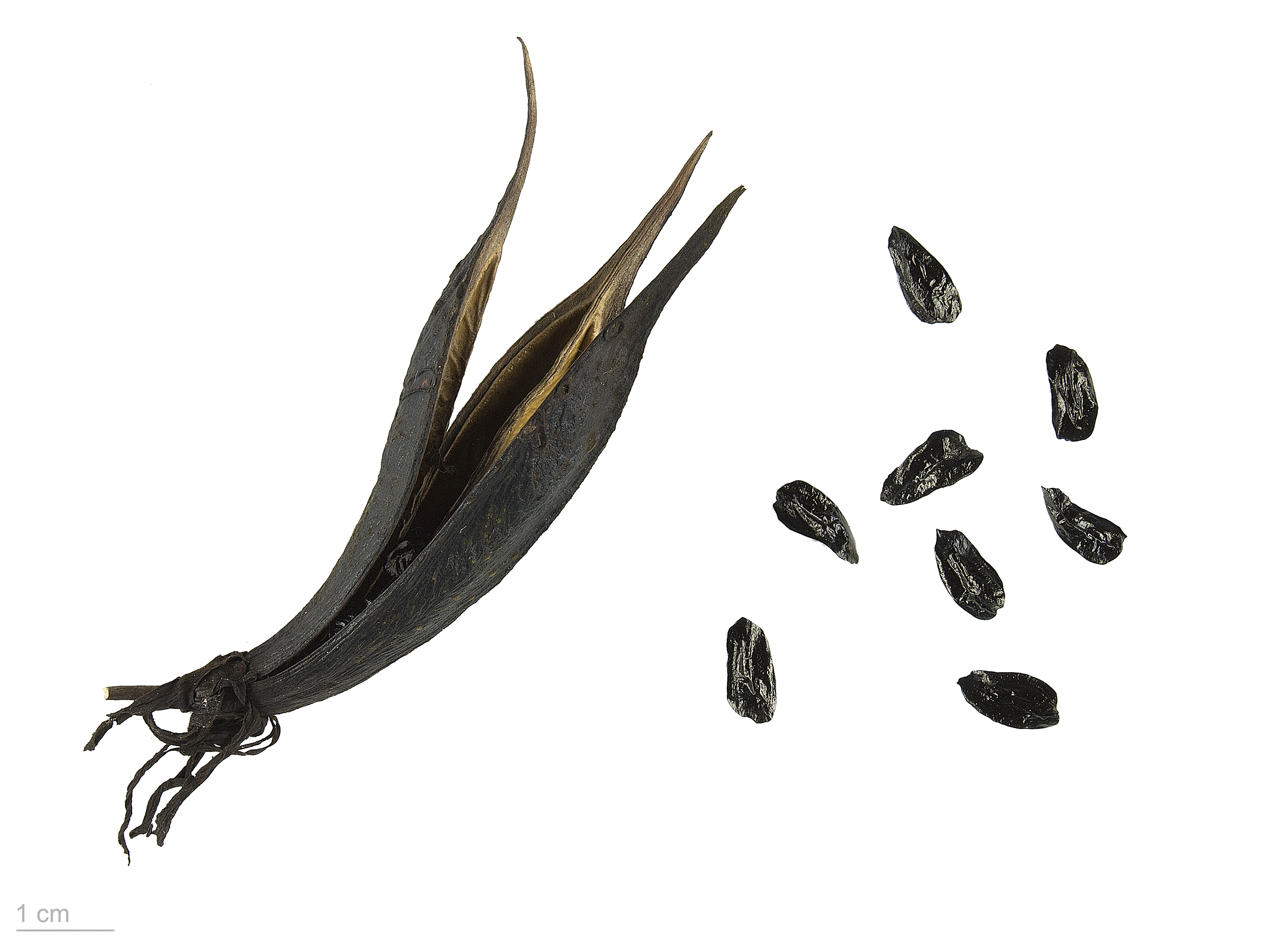
Phormium tenax - MHNT

Phormium is an herbaceous perennial monocot. The tough, sword-shaped leaves grow up to 3 metres (10 ft) long and up to 125 millimetres (5 in) wide. They are usually darkish green but sometimes have coloured edges and central ribs. Cultivated varieties range from light green through pink to deep russet bronze. There are numerous variegated cultivars with leaves marked by contrasting stripes in shades of green, red, bronze, pink and yellow.

The rigid flower stalks can be up to 5 metres (16 ft) long, projecting high above the foliage. In November (in New Zealand) they produce clumps of curving tube-like flowers which turn bright red when mature. These produce unusually large quantities of nectar to attract all nectar-feeding birds such as the tūī and insects. The seedpods that develop after pollination, each contain hundreds of seeds which are later widely dispersed by the wind.

== Distribution and habitat ==
Phormium tenax occurs naturally in New Zealand and Norfolk Island, while P. colensoi is endemic to New Zealand. Both species have been widely distributed to temperate regions of the world as economic fibre and ornamental plants.

They are found mainly in swamps or low-lying areas but will grow in a variety of habitats.

== Cultivation ==
The two species readily interbreed and there is part considerable regional variation in Phormium colensoi. Where the two species co-occur, there is local introgression.

In recent years, there has been a dramatic increase in the number of Phormium cultivars commercially available. The 2005–2006 edition of the Royal Horticultural Society Plant Finder listed 75 cultivars. As early as the 1920s it was recognised that ploidy plays a role in some cultivars due to the work of John Stuart Yeates. The highly regarded sport Ngaro was isolated from the Moutoa swamp, Foxton.

The following cultivars have gained the Royal Horticultural Society's Award of Garden Merit for growing in UK gardens:

- Phormium colensoi subsp. hookeri 'Cream Delight'
- Phormium colensoi subsp. hookeri 'Tricolor'
- Phormium 'Duet'
- Phormium 'Sundowner'
- Phormium tenax 'Variegatum'
- Phormium 'Yellow Wave'

== Uses ==
Phormium produces long leaf fibres that have played an important role in the culture, history and economy of New Zealand. Both species have been widely distributed to temperate regions of the world as economic fibre and ornamental plants.

== See also ==
- List of plants known as lily
