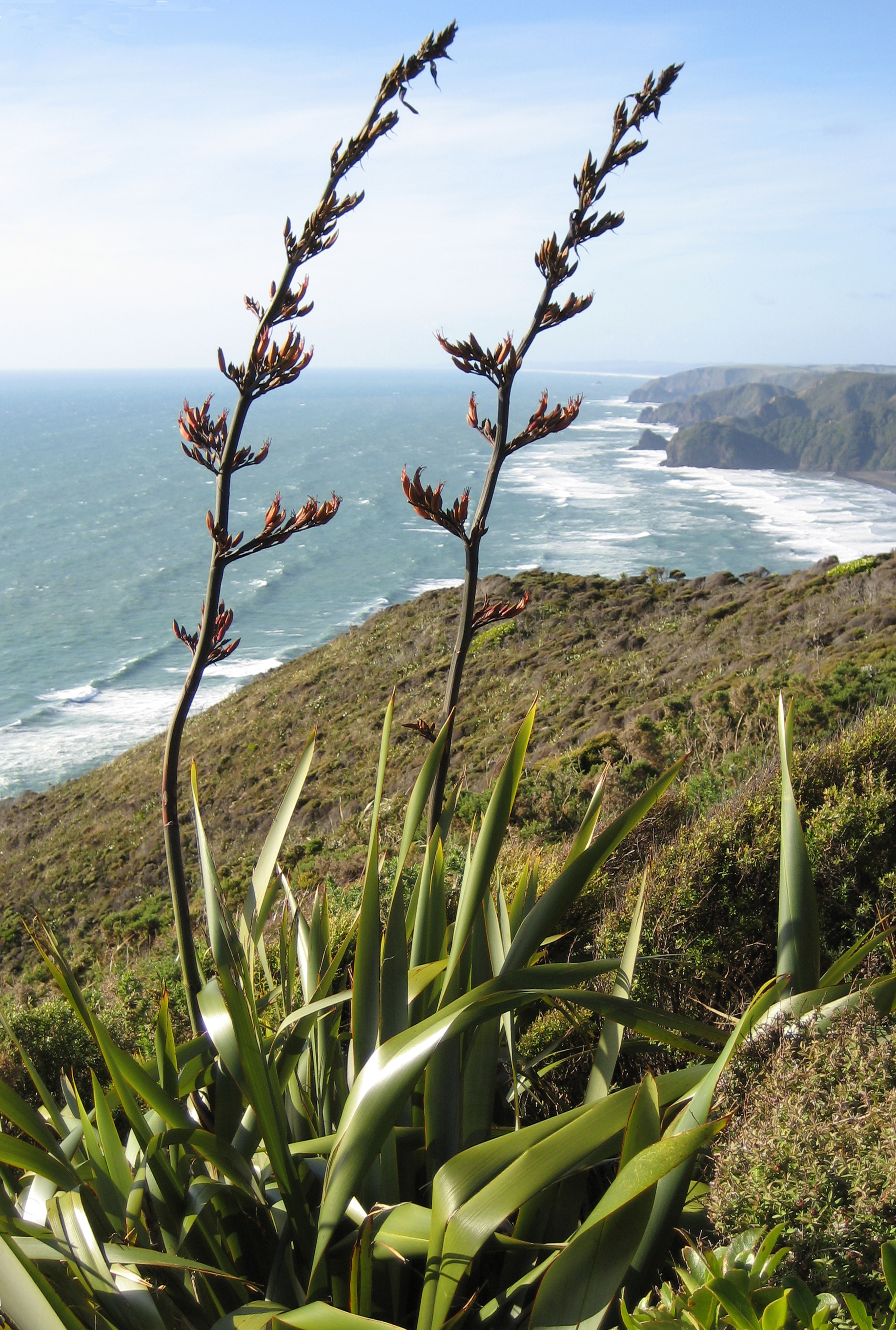
- In Piha, New Zealand

Scientific classification
- Kingdom: Plantae
- Clade: Tracheophytes
- Clade: Angiosperms
- Clade: Monocots
- Order: Asparagales
- Family: Asphodelaceae
- Subfamily: Hemerocallidoideae
- Genus: Phormium
- Species: P. tenax

Binomial name
- Phormium tenax J.R.Forst. & G.Forst.

= Phormium tenax =

Species of flowering plant

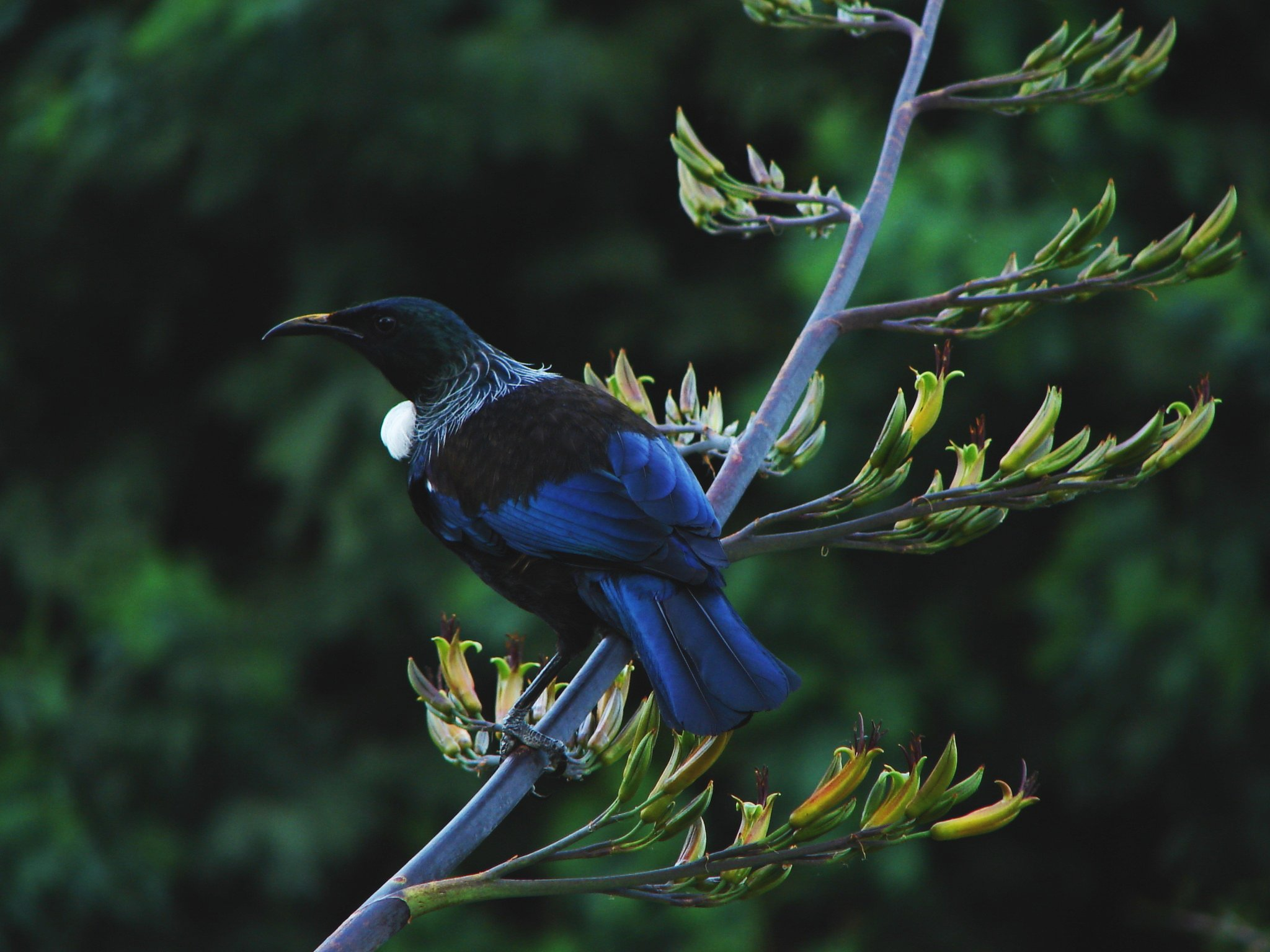
Tūī on New Zealand flax

Phormium tenax (called flax in New Zealand English; harakeke in Māori; New Zealand flax outside New Zealand; and New Zealand hemp in historical nautical contexts) is an evergreen perennial plant native to New Zealand and Norfolk Island that is an important fibre plant and a popular ornamental plant. The plant grows as a clump of long, straplike leaves, up to two metres long, from which arises a much taller flowering shoot, with dramatic yellow or red flowers.

Despite being commonly known as 'flax', harakeke is of the genus Phormium, a monocot, and is a leaf fibre, whereas flax (linen) is of the genus Linum, a rosid, and is a bast fibre (which comes from the stem of the plant). The two plants have an extremely distant evolutionary relationship with each other.

The fibre has been widely used since the arrival of Māori to New Zealand, originally in Māori traditional textiles and also in rope and sail making after the arrival of Europeans until at least WWII. It is an invasive species in some of the Pacific Islands and in Australia.

The blades of the plant contain cucurbitacins, which are poisonous to some animals, and some of them are among the bitterest tastes to humans.

== Taxonomy ==
Phormium tenax J.R.Forst & G.Forst was described in 1776 by Johann Reinhold Forster and Georg Forster, who were the father and son team of German botanists on the second voyage of James Cook.

== Etymology ==
The hara in the Māori name harakeke is a remnant of the Austronesian root *paŋudaN (via Proto-Oceanic *padran) surviving in related languages referring to pandanus plants with similar characteristics of sheathing leaves also used for weaving (like Pandanus tectorius, also known as hala in Hawaiian), as New Zealand was one of the only places where pandanus was not available.

== Ecology ==
The jumping spider Trite planiceps lives predominantly in the rolled-up leaves of this species. Phormium tenax is a coastal cover plant associated with significant habitat such as the breeding habitat for the endangered yellow-eyed penguin.

== Māori traditional uses ==
New Zealand flax was one of the most commonly used fibres for weaving prior to European contact in New Zealand, due to its wide availability and long strands. Harakeke can be woven raw to create open-weave items (where the para or the waterproof epidermis of the plant is kept intact), or processed so only the muka remains, for close-weave objects. The width and length of harakeke leaves allow weavers to create a variety of strip lengths, making the plant suitable for a range of objects and sizes.

In pre-European society, Māori had specific plantations of flax, which was their most important textile. It was prepared by cutting the green leaves close to the base before the leaves were split and woven. Various preparations of the leaves allowed the material to be used both as a hardy flat thick-woven material (as in kete and mats) and also as a fibrous twine, used for creating both rope and finely woven cloaks.

Harakeke can be boiled with hot stones to bleach strips, however dying the fibre is difficult due to the water resistant para. However, harakeke can by dyed using paru, or an iron-rich mud. Harakeke can be made more flexible with less shrinkage using the hapine technique, where a knife or shell is run across the fibre to remove moisture without breaking the surface layers.

== Cultivation ==
Phormium tenax had many uses in traditional Māori society. It was the main material used for weaving, adopted after aute (paper mulberry), the traditional tree used to create fabric in Polynesia, did not thrive in New Zealand's climate. Many of the traditional uses have largely fallen into disuse, though there is an upswing in the use of traditional materials in modern Māori art and craft. The two most common forms for flax in traditional craft are the use of stripped, dried leaves as broad bands, such as in the weaving of kete (flax baskets), and the scraping, pounding, and washing of the leaves to create a fibre — muka — which is used in tāniko (weaving) of soft, durable fabric for clothing. Flax is also used as a decorative and structural element in tukutuku, panelling found within Māori wharenui (meeting houses).

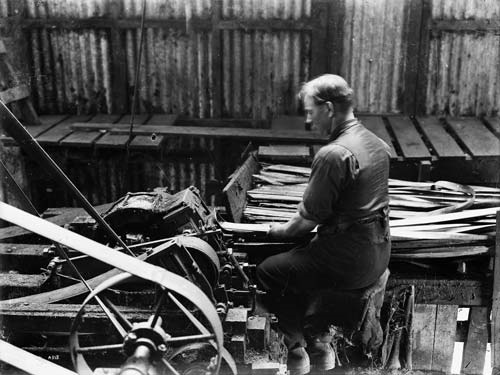
A worker feeding a flax leaf into a stripper, circa 1910.

Prior to the Great Depression of the 1930s, which decimated flax as an industry, there were two serious attempts by Europeans to breed for fibre. The first was by Wellington-based Leonard Cockayne about 1908. The second by Massey-based John Stuart Yeates in the late 1920s. More recently research led by Xiaowen Yuan at Massey University has investigated the use of novel composite materials made from flax fibre to improve supercapacitor performance.

New Zealand Flax was cultivated on Saint Helena from the late 1800s to around 1966 for the production of string and rope and for export. Today the plants remain but the industry has stopped; they are considered an ecological problem.

=== Ornamental ===
In recent times, P. tenax and its cousin P. colensoi have been widely cultivated as ornamental garden plants, their striking fans of pointed leaves providing a focal point in mixed plantings or at the edge of a lawn. They are easy to grow in a sunny spot, especially in coastal areas with some protection in winter, but require reliably moist soil. They are frequently found in garden centres amongst plants with a similar appearance, notably Yucca and Cordyline. However, these are very different plants with different requirements. P. tenax and some cultivars can grow to a substantial size - 4 m (13 ft) tall by 2 m (7 ft) broad.

=== Cultivars ===
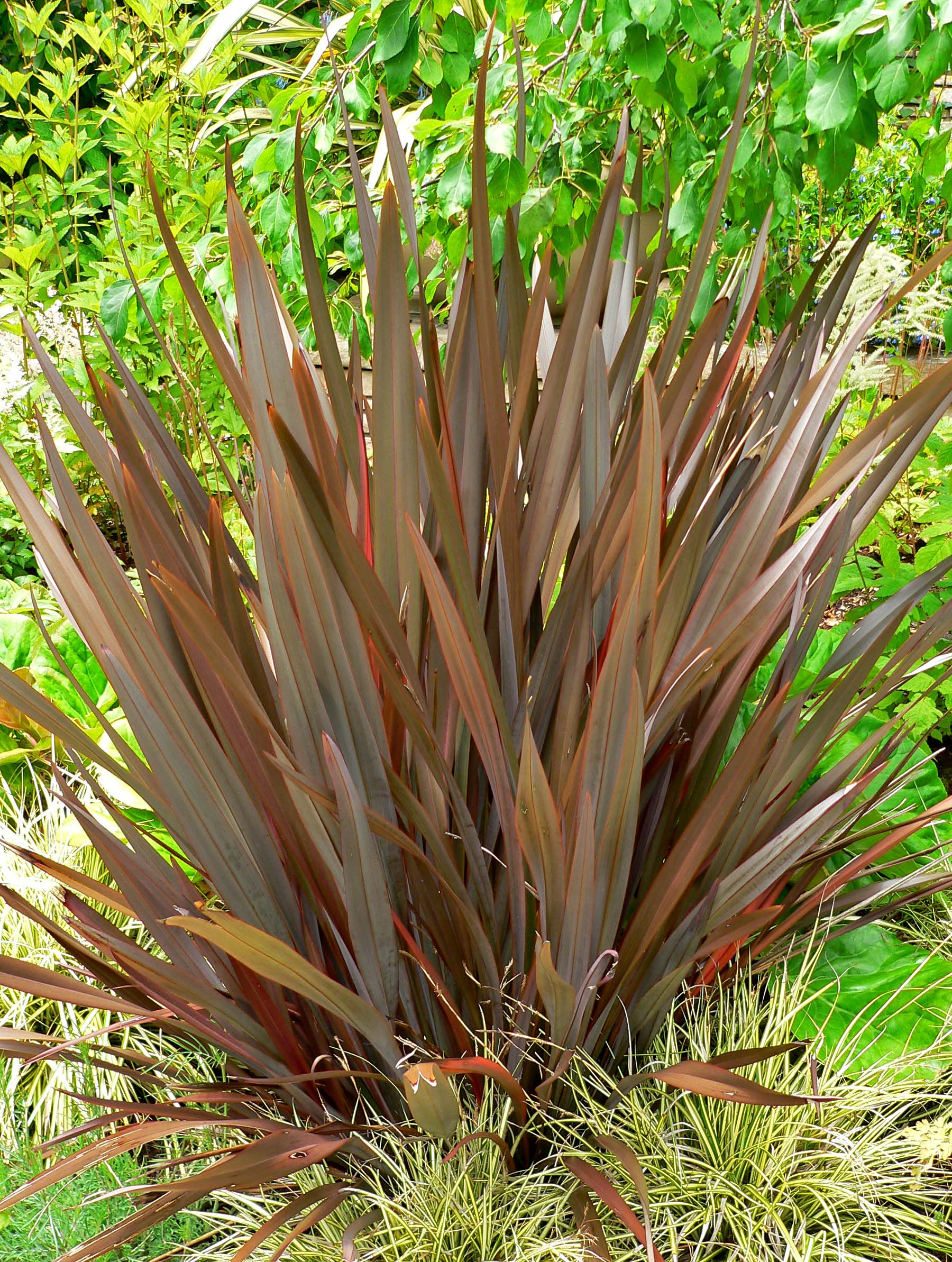
Phormium 'Amazing Red'

More recently several cultivars have been selected as decorative garden plants, including:

- 'Bronze Baby' - arching bronze leaves, 2-to-3-foot (0.61 to 0.91 m) plant.
- 'Dazzler' - arching leaves that are bronze-maroon with red and pink stripes, plant reaches 3 feet in height
- 'Duet'agm
- Purpureum Group agm
- 'Sundowner'agm - 6-foot-tall (1.8 m) plant, leaves are striped with bronze, green and rose-pink
- 'Variegatum'agm
- 'Yellow Wave'agm

Those marked agm have gained the Royal Horticultural Society's Award of Garden Merit.

== See also ==
- Phormium, covering both species
- Flax in New Zealand
