= Xiaowen Yuan =

Mechanical engineer in New Zealand

Academic background
- Education: University of Auckland
- Thesis: Plasma modification of natural fibres in polypropylene composites (2002)
- Doctoral advisor: Debes Bhattacharyya

Xiaowen Yuan is a New Zealand materials scientist, and is a full professor at the Auckland University of Technology, specialising in novel composite materials from natural materials for high performance uses, such as improving supercapacitor performance.

== Academic career ==
Yuan completed a PhD titled Plasma modification of natural fibres in polypropylene composites at the University of Auckland in 2002. Yuan worked at the Singapore Institute of Manufacturing Technology, and was an adjunct professor at the National University of Singapore. Yuan then joined the faculty of Massey University and later the Auckland University of Technology. She was promoted to full professor at AUT in 2024. Yuan leads the Future Fibres Laboratory at AUT, and is a professor in the mechanical engineering department.

Yuan's research focuses on novel composite materials, especially from natural materials such as gelatine, cellulose and collagen. In 2018 Yuan received a Smart Ideas grant from the Ministry of Business, Innovation and Employment worth just under $1 million, to research the use of harakeke (New Zealand flax) fibres to improve supercapacitor performance. Supercapacitors are more sustainable alternatives to batteries, but are limited by electrode problems. Yuan and her research team are also investigating the use of other plant and animal fibres such as industrial hemp and wool, in other high-performance uses, such as smart textiles and medical uses. They research fibre production and processing, including fibre surface modification, through to product development.

== Selected works ==
- Libo Yan; Nawawi Chouw; Xiaowen Yuan (2012). "Improving the mechanical properties of natural fibre fabric reinforced epoxy composites by alkali treatment". Journal of Reinforced Plastics and Composites. 31 (6): 425–437. doi:10.1177/0731684412439494. Wikidata Q124476272.
- Xiaowen Yuan; Krishnan Jayaraman; Debes Bhattacharyya (2004). "Effects of plasma treatment in enhancing the performance of woodfibre-polypropylene composites". Composites Part A: Applied Science and Manufacturing. 35 (12): 1363–1374. doi:10.1016/j.compositesa.2004.06.023. Wikidata Q124476282.
- John Eric Little; Xiaowen Yuan; Mark Ian Jones (2012). "Characterisation of voids in fibre reinforced composite materials". NDT and E International. 46: 122–127. doi:10.1016/j.ndteint.2011.11.011. Wikidata Q124476273.
- D. Y. Liu; Xiaowen Yuan; D. Bhattacharyya; A. J. Easteal (2010). "Characterisation of solution cast cellulose nanofibre – reinforced poly(lactic acid)". EXPRESS polymer letters. 4 (1): 26–31. doi:10.3144/expresspolymlett.2010.5. Wikidata Q124476274.
- Yitong Zhai; Xiaowen Yuan (2023). "Superhydrophobic, Magnetic Aerogels Based on Nanocellulose Fibers Derived from Harakeke for Oily Wastewater Remediation". Polymers. 15 (19): 3941. doi:10.3390/polym15193941. PMID 37835991. Wikidata Q124473915.
- Heng Wu; Wenyu Yuan; Xiaowen Yuan; Laifei Cheng (2022). "Atmosphere‐free activation methodology for holey graphene/cellulose nanofiber‐based film electrode with highly efficient capacitance performance". Carbon Energy. 5 (1). doi:10.1002/cey2.229. Wikidata Q124474230.
- Heng Wu; Yani Zhang; Wenyu Yuan; Yingxin Zhao; Shaohong Luo; Xiaowen Yuan; Lianxi Zheng; Laifei Cheng (2018). "Highly flexible, foldable and stretchable Ni–Co layered double hydroxide/polyaniline/bacterial cellulose electrodes for high-performance all-solid-state supercapacitors". Journal of Materials Chemistry A. 6 (34): 16617–16626. doi:10.1039/c8ta05673k. Wikidata Q124474238.
