= Rodney Power Station =

Proposed New Zealand natural gas power station

- Indicative render of the power station along State Highway 16
- Country: New Zealand
- Location: between Helensville and Kaukapakapa, Rodney District
- Coordinates: 36°38′36″S 174°29′6″E
- Status: Proposed
- Owner: Genesis Energy

Thermal power station
- Primary fuel: Natural gas
- Turbine technology: Gas turbine
- Combined cycle?: Yes

Power generation
- Units operational: 1 (initial); 2 (future)
- Nameplate capacity: 240 MW (initial); 480 MW (future)

The Rodney Power Station was a proposal for a natural gas fired combined cycle power station developed by Genesis Energy Limited. The project was abandoned in 2015.

The power station would have been located on a 48 ha site midway between Helensville and Kaukapakapa on State Highway 16, near the Kaipara Harbour, north west of Auckland. The proposed development included substantial upgrade or replacement of the Helensville waste water treatment plant, which the local council would otherwise have to fund.

The plant was designed to use high efficiency combined cycle gas turbine technology to meet the increasing demand for electricity in the north Auckland region. The location would also have assisted to ease constraints on HV electricity transmission.

In its assessment of Transpower's proposal to upgrade HV transmission to north of Auckland, the Electricity Commission considered that the Rodney power station project provided a generation alternative to transmission.

== Consenting ==
Genesis Energy's applications for resource consents including air discharges were notified for public submissions in April 2008, a public hearing was held in September and the resource consents were granted by Auckland Regional Council in December 2008.

The project was opposed by some local residents, Greenpeace, and the Green Party.

Land use resource consents for the power station were granted by Rodney District Council in March 2009. A variation to the District Plan created a thermal energy generation rural zone between Helensville and Kaukapakapa.

Although resource consents and the District Plan provisions are in place, Genesis does not intend to proceed with construction in the near future. The resource consents allowed Genesis a period of 15 years in which to build the plant. In July 2015, Genesis officially abandoned the project, and put the site up for sale.

== See also ==
- Electricity sector in New Zealand
- List of power stations in New Zealand
