= Tāniko =

Traditional Māori weaving technique

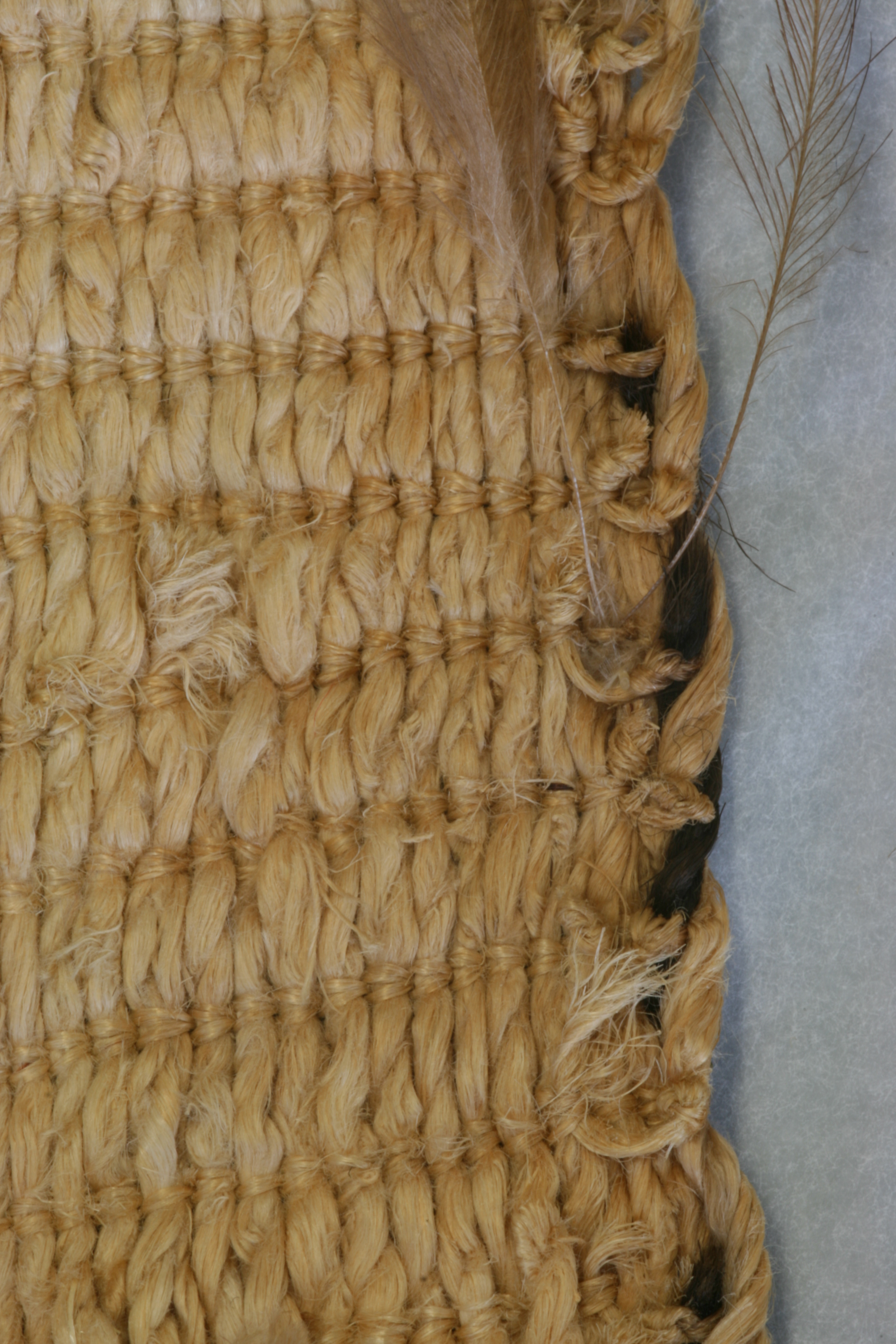
Detail of border of a kahu kiwi made using tāniko

Tāniko (or taaniko) is a traditional weaving technique of the Māori of New Zealand related to "twining". It may also refer to the resulting bands of weaving, or to the traditional designs featuring geometric, patterned boarders.

The tāniko technique does not require a loom, although one can be used. Traditionally free hanging warps were suspended between two weaving pegs and the process involved twining downward. The traditional weaving material is muka, fibre prepared from harakeke (Phormium tenax) by scraping, pounding and washing. The muka fibre was dyed using natural dyes.

There has been a resurgence of tāniko and other Māori cultural practices starting in the 1950s and as part of the broader Māori Renaissance. This has led to tāniko practitioners Diggeress Te Kanawa and her mother Dame Rangimārie Hetet receiving honorary doctorates from the University of Waikato.

The award-winning designer, Adrienne Whitewood (Rongowhaakata), demonstrates a new wave of Māori designers connecting customary designs and techniques with modern designs. Her work Tāniko was the Supreme Award Winner of the Cult Couture Fashion Awards in 2012.

== Bibliography ==
- "Te Whatu Taaniko: Taaniko Weaving", Sidney M. Mead, 1968, ISBN 0-474-00260-8, ISBN 978-0-474-00260-1
- "Weaving a Kakahu", Diggeress Te Kanawa, 1992, Bridget Williams Books Ltd, ISBN 0-908912-08-0
- "The Art of Maori Weaving: The Eternal Thread Te Aho Mutunga Kore", Miriama Evans and Ranui Ngarimu, 2005, Huia Publishers, ISBN 1-86969-161-X
