= Flax in New Zealand =

Flax fibre (Phormium) in New Zealand

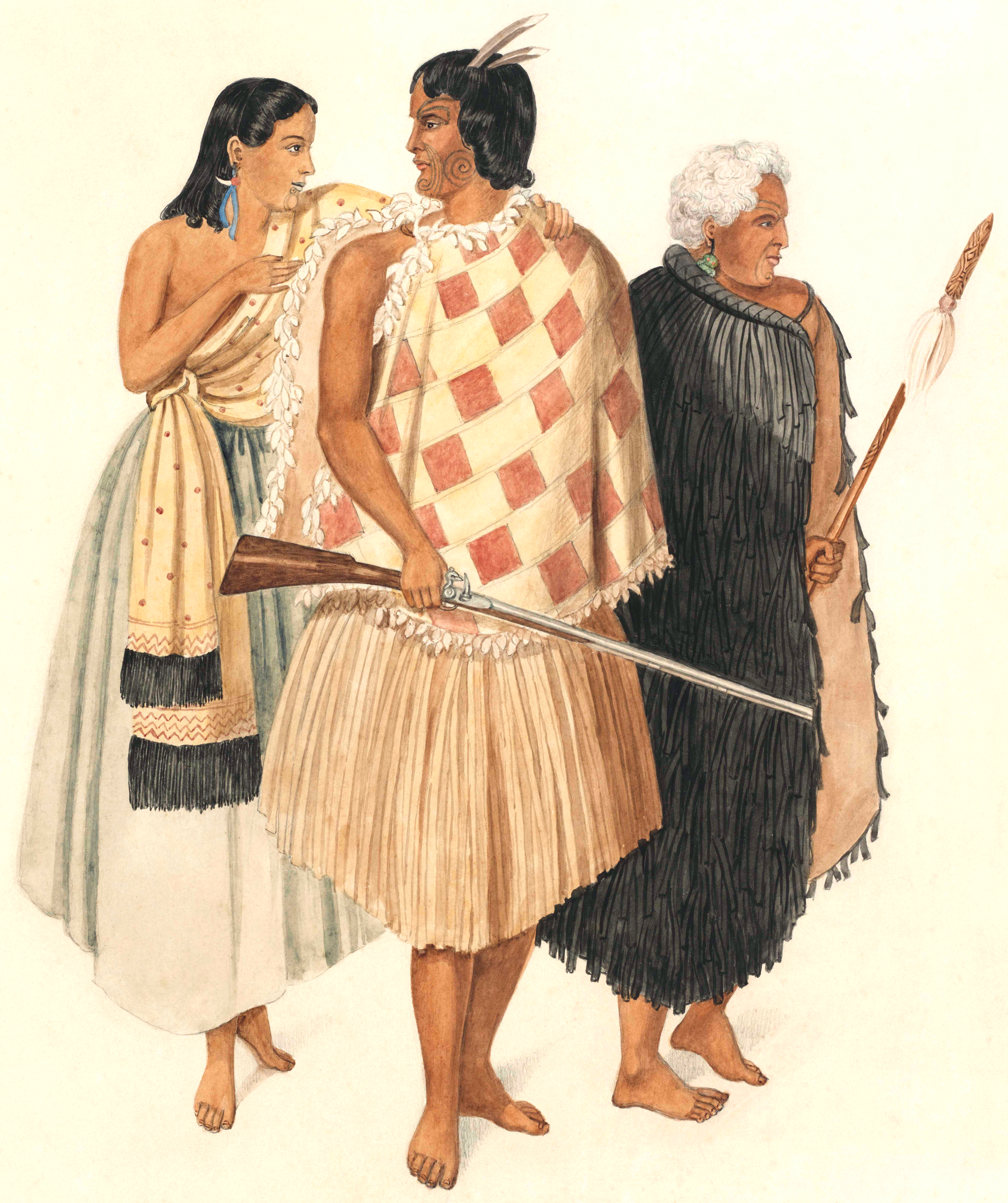
Hōne Heke (centre) wearing a short checked flax and feather cloak and flax skirt. His uncle Kawiti is on the right in a flax cloak.

In New Zealand English, the term flax describes the common New Zealand perennial plants Phormium tenax and Phormium colensoi, known by the Māori names harakeke and wharariki respectively, quite distinct from the Northern Hemisphere plant Linum usitatissimum known as "flax".

P. tenax occurs naturally in New Zealand and Norfolk Island, while P. colensoi is endemic to New Zealand. They have played an important part in the cultural and economic history of New Zealand for both the Māori people (who adapted earlier Polynesian traditions of pandanus weaving otherwise unproductive in a colder climate) and the later European settlers.

Both species and their cultivars have now been widely distributed to temperate regions of the world as ornamental garden plants – and to lesser extent for fibre production.

== Traditional Māori uses ==
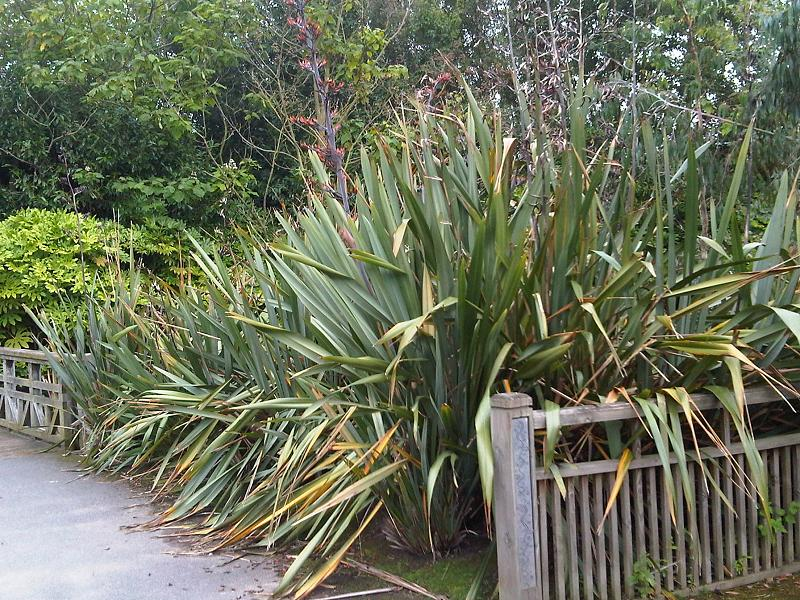
New Zealand flax (harakeke in Māori)

=== Textiles ===
Although the Māori made textiles from a number of other plants, including tī kōuka, tōī, pingao, kiekie, toetoe and the paper mulberry, the use of harakeke and wharariki was predominant, due to its wide availability, long strands and the ability to create a range of strip widths from the plants. Captain Cook wrote: “Of the leaves of these plants, with very little preparation, they (the Māori) make all their common apparel; and of these they make also their strings, lines and cordage …”. They also made baskets, mats and fishing nets from undressed flax. Māori practised advanced weft twining in phormium fibre cloaks.

Plaiting and weaving (raranga) the flax fibres into baskets were but only two of the great variety of uses made of flax by Māori who recognised nearly 60 varieties, and who carefully propagated their own flax nurseries and plantations throughout the land. Leaves were cut near the base of the plant using a sharp mussel shell or specially shaped rocks, more often than not greenstone (jade, or pounamu). The green fleshy substance of the leaf was stripped off (the waterproof para), again using a mussel shell, right through to the fibre which went through several processes of washing, bleaching, fixing, softening, dyeing and drying. The flax fibre, called muka, is laboriously washed, pounded and hand wrung to make soft for the skin. It is difficult to dye fibres made from harakeke, however paru (an iron-rich mud) can be used to dye the fabric black. The cords (muka whenu) form the base cloth for intricate cloaks or garments (kākahu) such as the highly prized traditional feather cloak (kahu huruhuru). Different type of cloaks, such as kahu kiwi and kahu kākā, were produced by adorning them with colourful feathers from different native birds, such as kiwi, kākā (parrot), tūī, huia and kererū (woodpigeon).

Fibres of various strengths were used to fashion eel traps (hinaki), massive fishing nets (kupenga) and lines, bird snares, cordage for ropes, baskets (kete), bags, mats, clothing, sandals (paraerae), buckets, food baskets (rourou), and cooking utensils etc. The handmade flax cording and ropes had such great tensile strength that they were used to successfully bind together sections of hollowed out logs to create huge ocean-going canoes (waka). With the help of wakas, pre-European Māori deployed seine nets which could be over one thousand metres long. The nets were woven from green flax, with stone weights and light wood or gourd floats, and could require hundreds of men to haul. It was also used to make rigging, sails and lengthy anchor warps, and roofs for housing. Frayed ends of flax leaves were fashioned into torches and lights for use at night. The dried flower stalks, which are extremely light, were bound together with flax twine to make river rafts called mokihi.

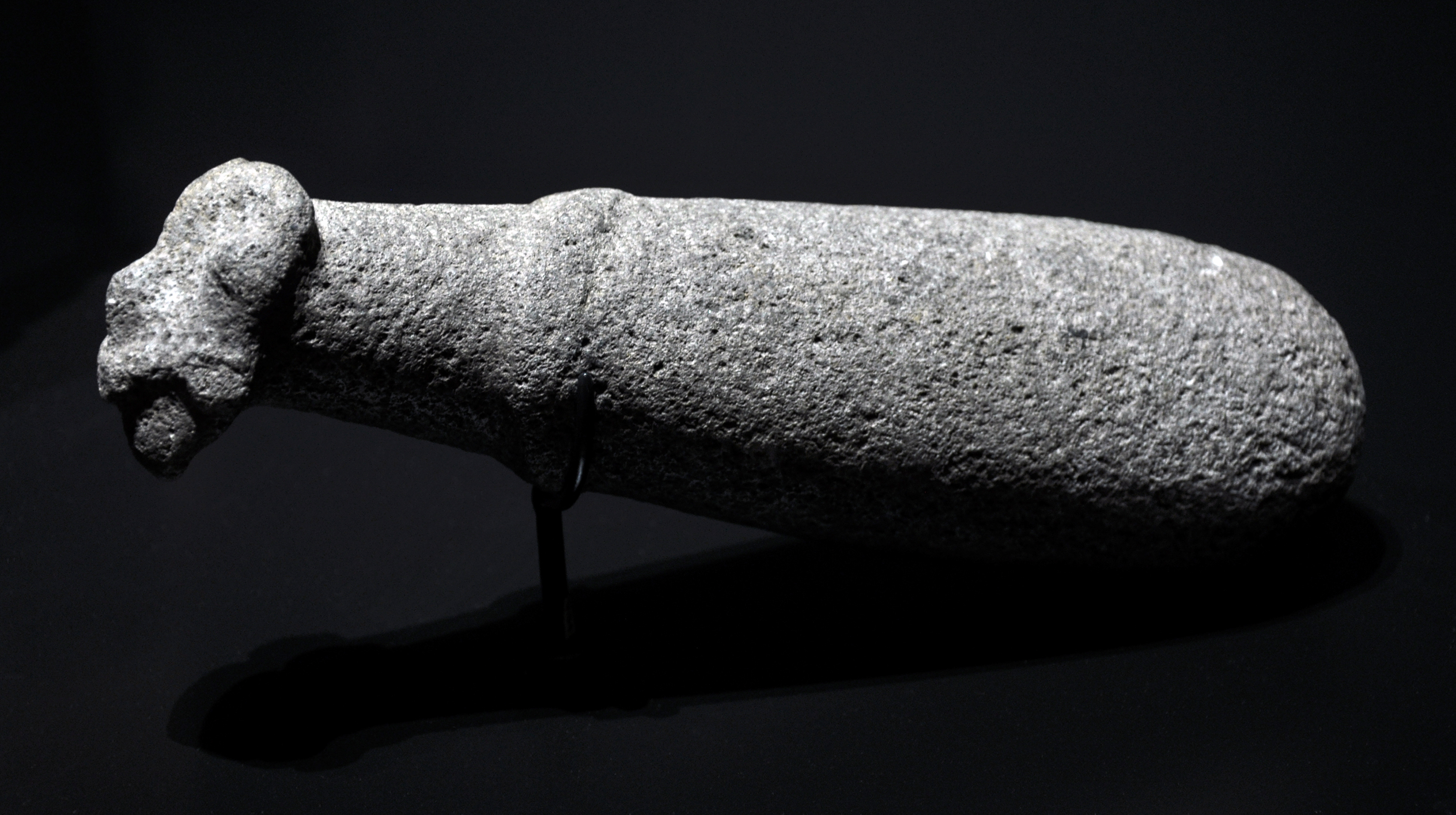
Māori stone pestle for flax fibres

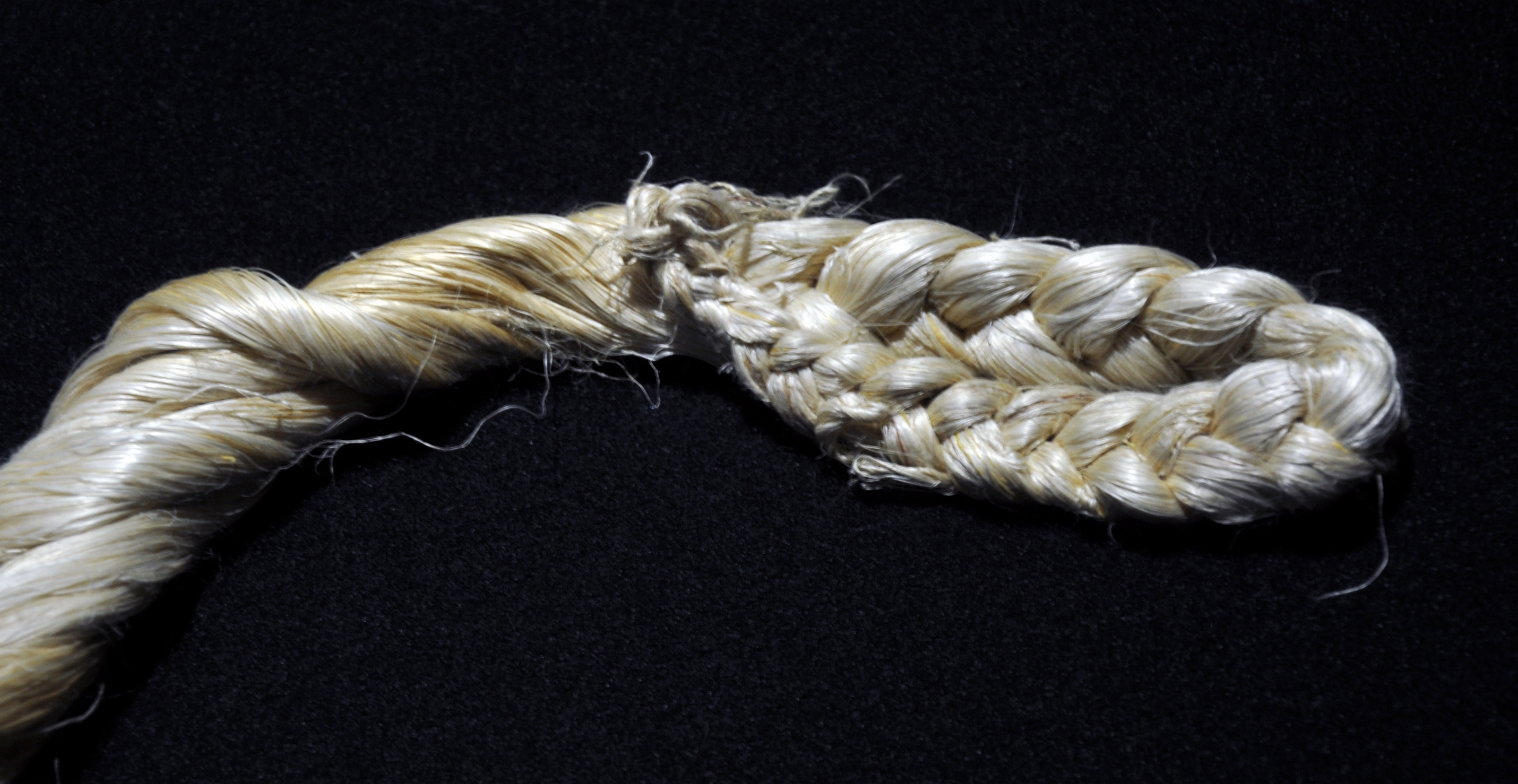
Flax fibres (muka)

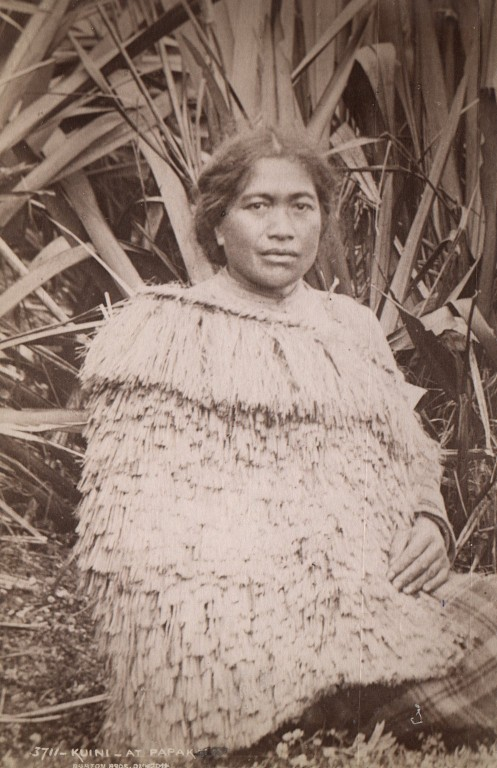
Māori woman wearing the traditional costume made of flax fibre, c. 1880

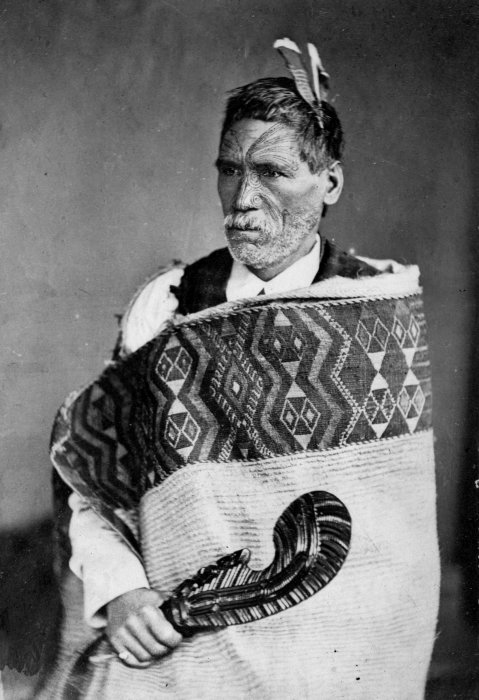
Photo of Rewi Manga Maniapoto in a flax cloak, 1879

=== Medical ===
For centuries, Māori have used nectar from the flowers for medicinal purposes and as a general sweetener. Boiled and crushed harakeke roots were applied externally as a poultice for boils, tumours and abscesses, as well as to varicose ulcers. Juice from pounded roots was used as a disinfectant, and taken internally to relieve constipation or expel worms. The pulp of pounded leaves was applied as dressings to bullet, bayonet or other wounds. The gum-like sap produced by harakeke contains enzymes that give it blood clotting and antiseptic qualities to help healing processes. It is a mild anaesthetic, and Māori traditionally applied the sap to boils and various wounds, to aching teeth, to rheumatic and associated pains, ringworm and various skin irritations, and scalds and burns. Splints were fashioned from korari (flower stalks) and leaves, and fine cords of muka fibre utilise the styptic properties of the gel before being used to stitch wounds. Harakeke is used as bandages and can secure broken bones much as plaster is used today.

Chemical analysis shows the antifungal, anti-inflammatory drug, musizin, and laxative anthraquinones are in common and mountain flaxes.

=== Defence ===
During the early Musket Wars and later New Zealand Wars, Māori used large, thickly woven flax mats to cover entrances and lookout holes in their "gunfighter's pā" fortifications. Some warriors wore coats of heavily plaited Phormium tenax, which gave defense characteristics similar to a medieval gambeson, slowing musket balls to be wounding rather than deadly.

== Colonial uses ==
In winter 1823 Captain John Rodolphus Kent went to Foveaux Strait, filled 14 large casks with flax, bought 1,100 lb (500 kg) of dressed flax, and took 25 flax plants. That trip was an experiment to confirm the value of flax. He continued trading until 1836 and several other traders followed his example.

Thus, by the early 19th century, the quality of rope materials made from New Zealand flax was known internationally, as was the quality of New Zealand trees which were used for spars and masts. The Royal Navy was one of the largest customers. The flax trade burgeoned, especially after male Māori recognised the advantages of trade and adapted to helping in the harvesting and dressing of flax which had previously been done exclusively by females. Driven by the desperate need for muskets and ammunition, many Māori moved to unhealthy swamplands where flax could be grown, and there devoted insufficient labour to the production of food, until any survivors were fully equipped, first with musket and ammunition, and then with iron tools. "The taking of slaves increased – slaves who could be put to work dressing flax...". A burgeoning flax industry developed with the fibres being used for rope, twine, matting, carpet under felt, and wool packs. Initially wild stands of flax were harvested but plantations were established with three in existence by 1851.

A Parliamentary Commission in 1870 reported on all aspects of the flax industry. It listed up to 24 varieties, with many regional variations in names.

Several times the possibility of commercial papermaking from the fibre from Phormium tenax has been investigated, but currently it is used only by artists and craftsmen producing handmade papers.

=== Flax mills ===
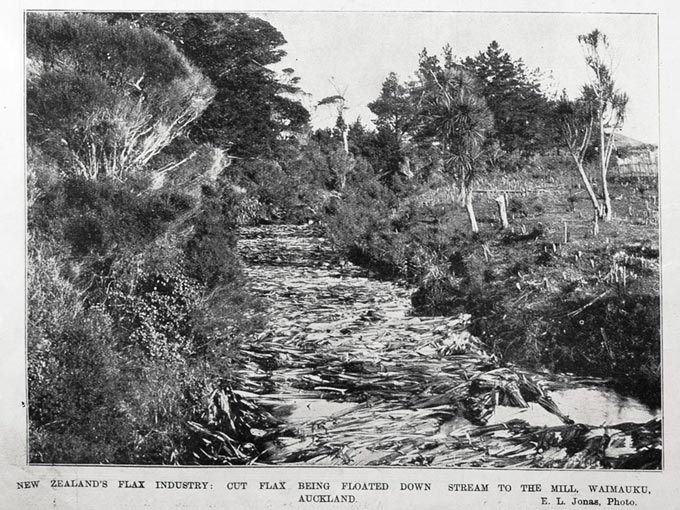
1902 cut flax being floated downstream to the mill at Waimauku AWNS-19021009-2-4

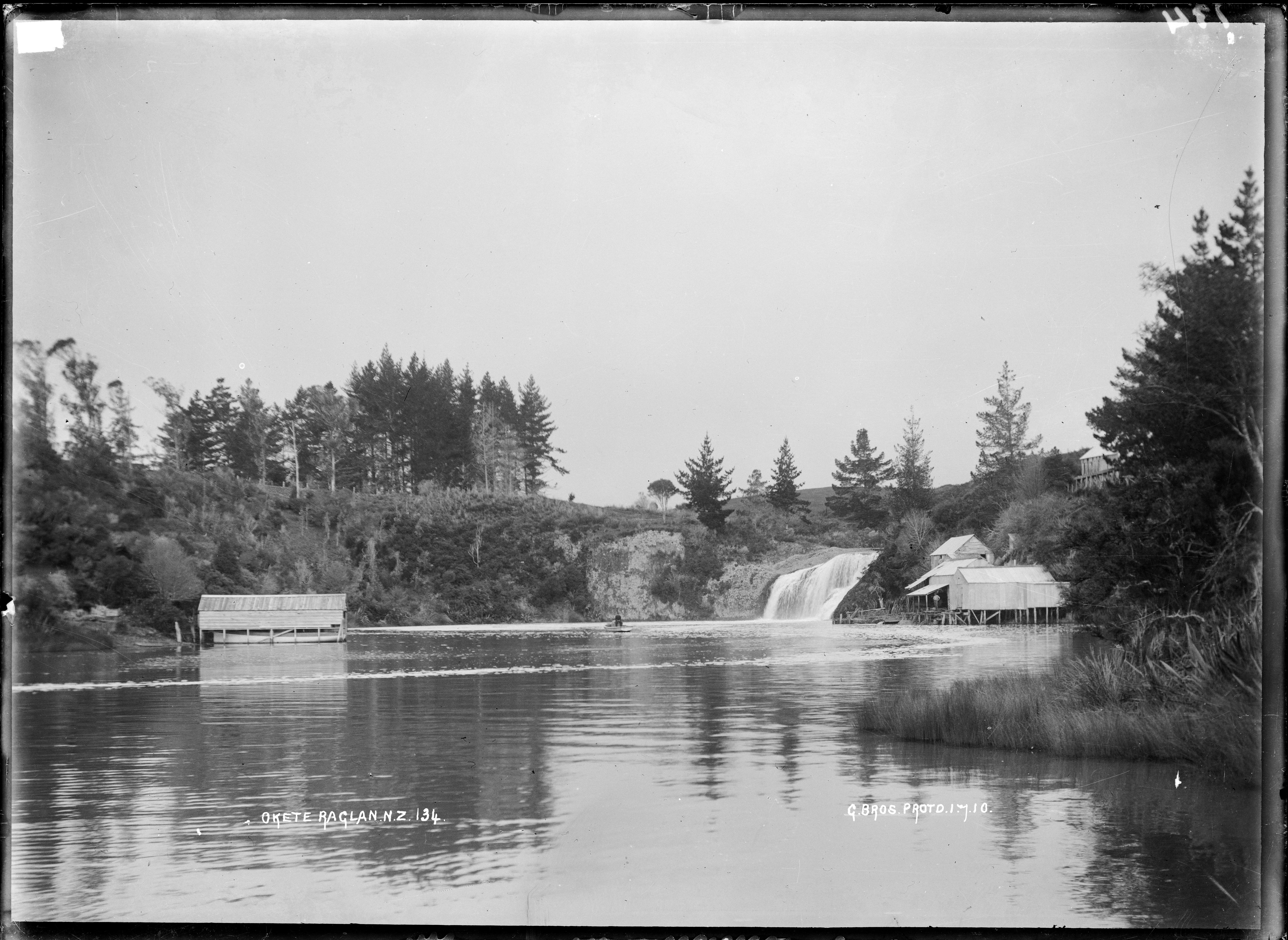
Water-powered Okete flax mill, near Raglan in 1910 (1868–1925) – Photograph taken by Gilmour Brothers G. Alexander Turnbull Library, Wellington

From about the 1860s there was an active industry harvesting and processing flax for export, peaking at 32,000 tons in 1916, but the general depression of the 1930s brought the virtual collapse of this trade. In 1963 there were still 14 flax mills producing a total of almost 5,000 tons of fibre per year, but the last of them closed in 1985.

In 1860 Purchas and Ninnis got the country's first patent for a flax machine. It took a ton of leaves a day and produced about 0.2 long tons (200 kg) of fibre. A large mill at Halswell had six of their patent strippers by 1868. Johnstone Dougall (1822–1892), a carpenter, also invented a flax-stripper about 1868, which he put in his first mill at Waiuku. Dougall was an exception in declining to patent his stripper. Many others patented variations, but the basic design was that leaves were fed between rollers, then hit by iron beaters, revolving faster than the feeder, thus stripping the epidermis from the fibre. Patents included Ritchie in 1862, Gibbons and Nelson in 1870, and Williams in 1893.

In boom times flax was profitable. An 1870 news item said an acre, with 2 crops a year, could produce 2 tons of fibre, equating to £40 a year, or a net profit of £27 0s 3d, the cost being estimated at £12 19s 9d. For 4 tons the cost was calculated as depreciation 12s, 8 men's wages @ 25s a week, £10; an engineman £1 15; 12 lads @ 12s, £7 4s; 24 tons of green flax @ 15s £18; packing, baling, etc. £4; 2 tons 8cwt. of coal, £2 8s and freight etc., £5. Machinery was estimated at £500 – 8 hp engine with Cornish boiler £200; 4 strippers @ £22, £88; scutching hooks, £15; a screw press £12; building £185.

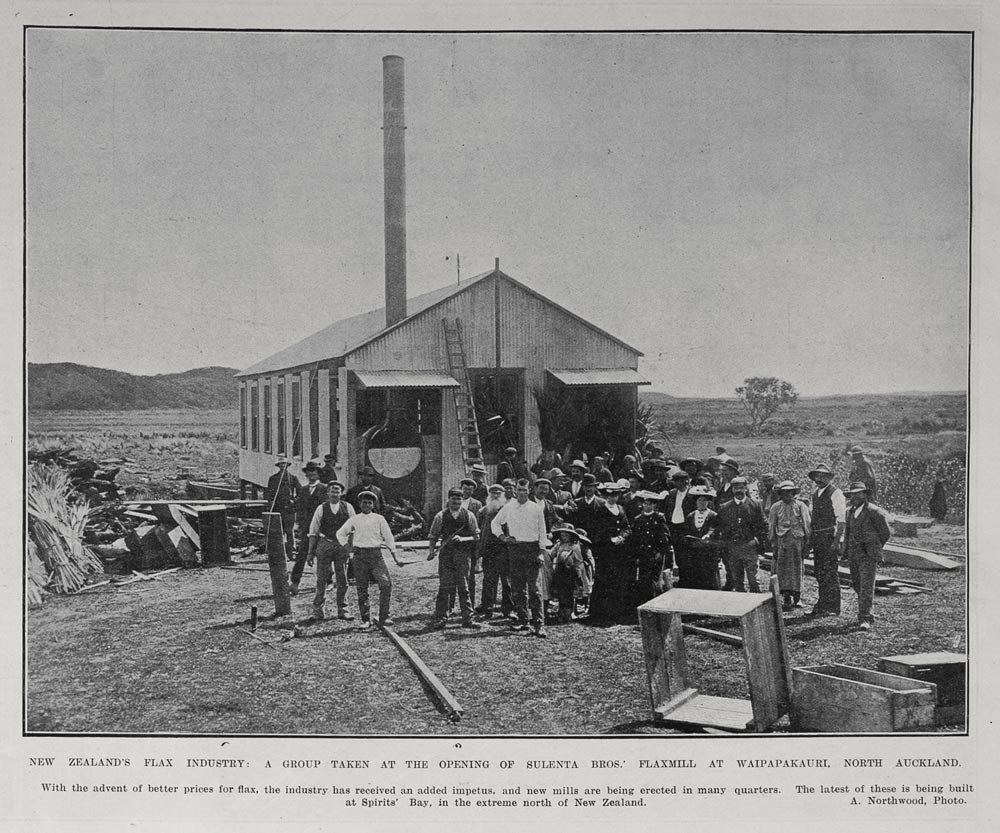
Waipapakauri steam-powered flax mill in 1906 AWNS-19061108-16-1

So the inventions were quickly taken up, flax mills increasing from 15 in 1867, to 110 in 1874, though another source says there were 161 mills by 1870, employing 1,766. A&G Price built almost 100 flax machines in 1868 and, by August 1869, had sold 166. The fibre was coarser than hand-stripped flax, but by 1868 machines could produce about 250 kg (550 lb) per day, compared to about 1 kg (2.2 lb) by hand stripping. Improvements by 1910 increased that to 1.27 tonnes a day.

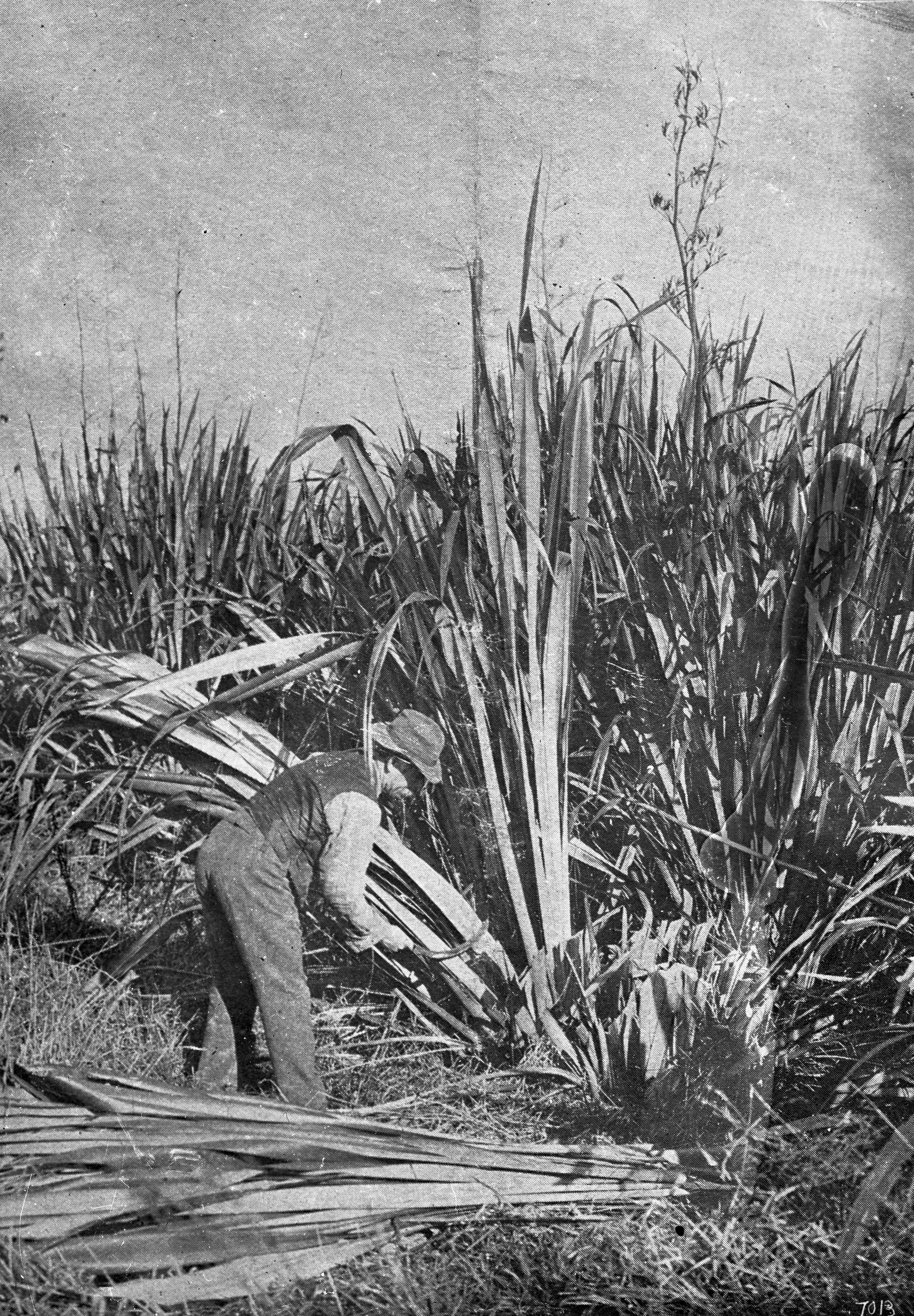
A worker harvesting green flax leaves with a sickle

Flax leaves were cut, bundled, taken to the mill and fed through a stripping machine. The slimy fibre was bunched, washed and the muka hung to dry. About ten days later the muka was scutched and baled for export, though some mills had ropewalks for local production. Production peaked between 1901 and 1918, but rust, depression and pasture replacing flax swamps, resulted in almost all mills closing by the 1930s.

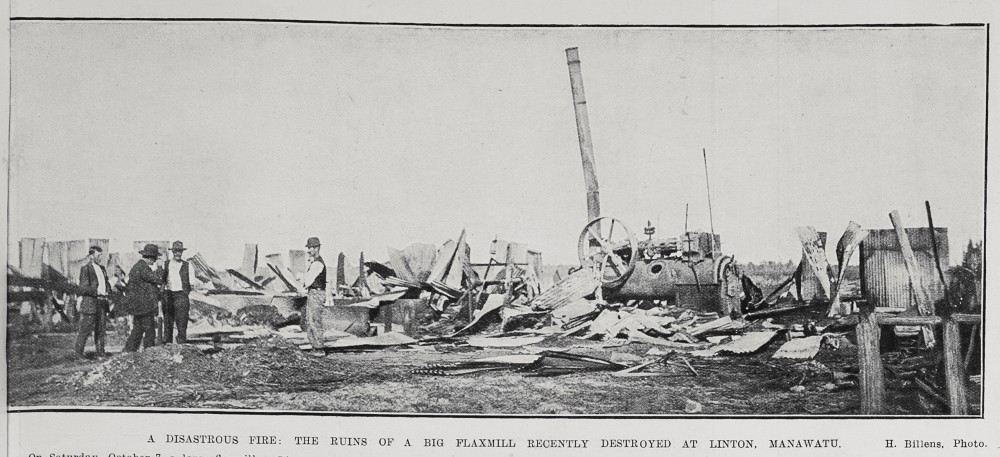
Linton steam-powered flaxmill after fire in 1911

Mills were driven by water wheels, small stationary steam engines, or portable engines.

With extensive burning of bush, few fire brigades, and little piped water, fire was a hazard for most buildings and flax was no exception. In 1890 a report on a fire in a large quantity of growing flax said, "These fires in most cases arise from gross carelessness, which might easily be avoided. Already in the past the quantity of green flax destroyed by this agency is very great." Mills were burnt too.

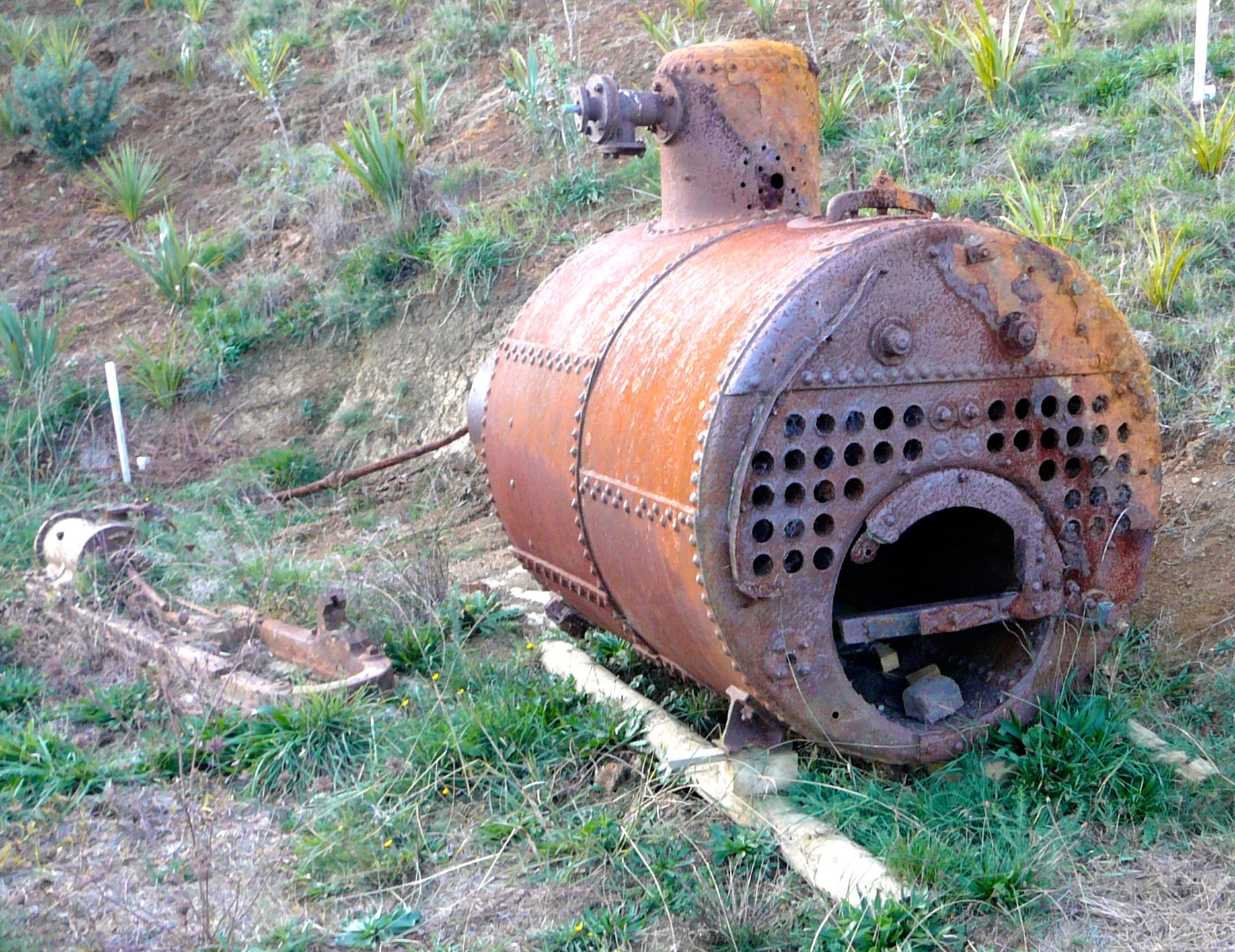
George Rutherford built a flax mill beside Kaitoke Creek, Raglan, in the early 1900s. This boiler was placed beside the boardwalk in 2008.

By 1890 3,198 people were employed, but average pay was only £73 a year, among the lowest of average wage rates at the time. There were also frequent cases of workers caught in machines. Initially unions were resisted, as in the report of an 1891 strike, which said, "Mr Hall intends to proceed to Auckland for the purpose of procuring fresh men to work the mill." The Industrial Conciliation and Arbitration Act 1894 and growth of unions improved the low pay and conditions. By 1913 a commentator wrote, "A few years ago flax milling was largely done by boys who received a few shillings per day, now in these more enlightened (?) days a boy gets a man’s wage. For instance the minimum wage paid this season at Mr Rutherford's Te Aoterei mill has been 11s 3d for a ten-hour day."

== Contemporary uses ==
In 2023 chemist Erin Leitao was awarded a Marsden Fund grant to study alternatives to PFAS (per- and polyfluoroalkyl substances, known as "forever chemicals" because of their resistance to breaking down in the environment). Under experimental conditions, short strands of harakeke proved effective at removing PFAS from water; various other cellulose-based substances had been used to filter PFAS, but harakeke fibres are very rigid and proved as effective a sorbent as activated carbon, while being simple and inexpensive to harvest and prepare.

== See also ==
- Agriculture in New Zealand
- Environment of New Zealand
