= Muka (fibre) =

Flax fibre used in textiles

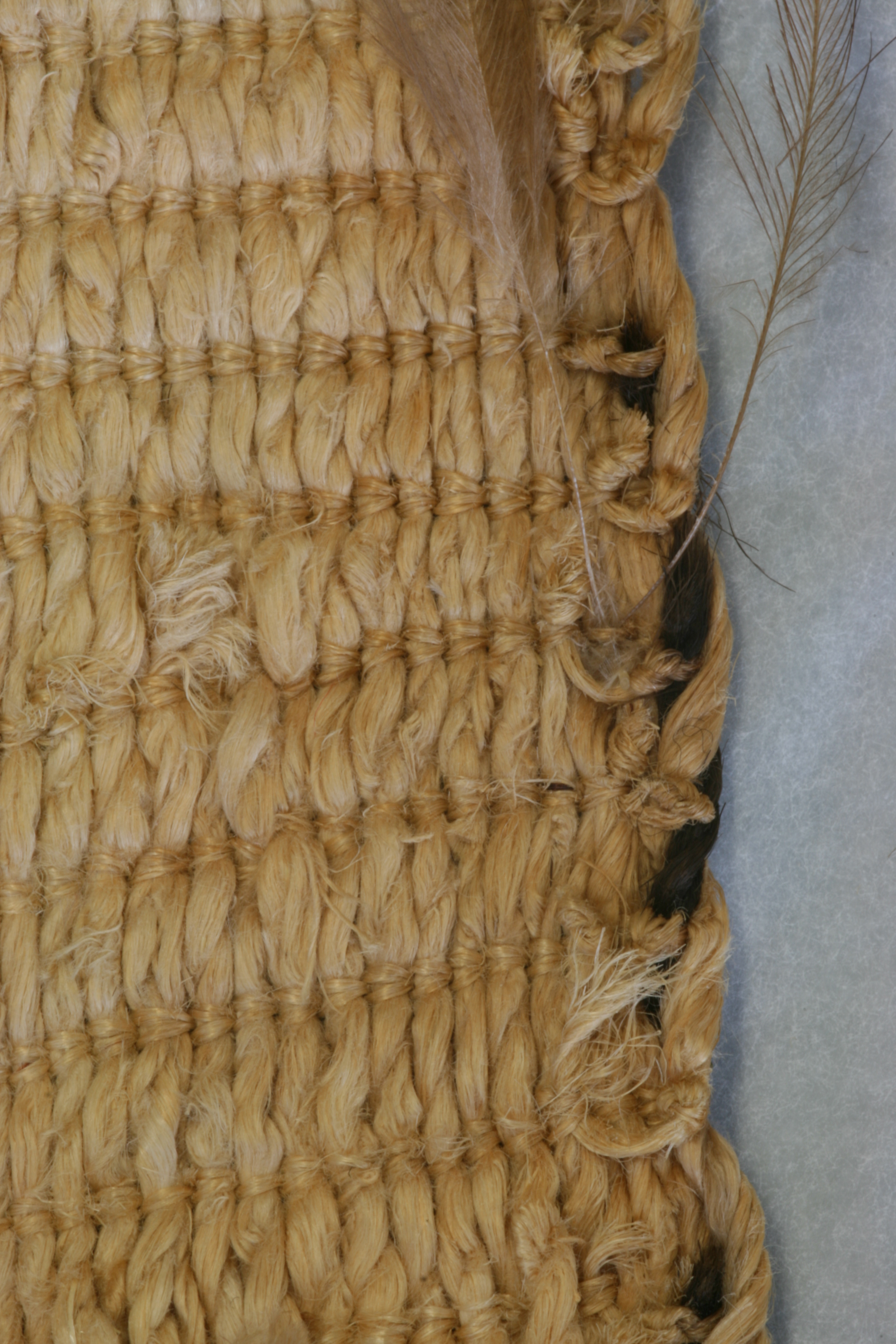
Detail of border of kahu kiwi woven using tāniko, the muka warps (vertical) are twisted pairs.

Muka is prepared fibre of New Zealand flax (Māori: harakeke). Prepared primarily by scraping, pounding and washing, it is a key material in Māori traditional textiles where it is usually used in tāniko or twined weaving. Some varieties produce different grades or quality of muka that result in characteristics such as strength, whiteness or shine.

In pre-European times, muka was widely used by the Māori and was the primary fibre used for weaving clothing. Patu muka or pounding stones were a distinct tool type.

In the early colonial period, muka was a trade staple, often being traded for muskets with devastating effects. Well into the European era it was used for paper, clothing and sacking, with large commercial workings in Foxton and elsewhere.

Since the Māori renaissance the resurgence in traditional Māori weaving has seen up-swing in the use of muka, especially for art and high-end craft items. Usually woven muka is distinguished from woven (unprepared) flax which is only suitable for coarse work such as bags (kete) and panels.

Wētā Workshop used muka to make the hair of The Wicker Husband, played by Alexander Skarsgård, in the 2026 film Wicker.
