= Kaukapakapa River =

River in the Auckland Region, New Zealand

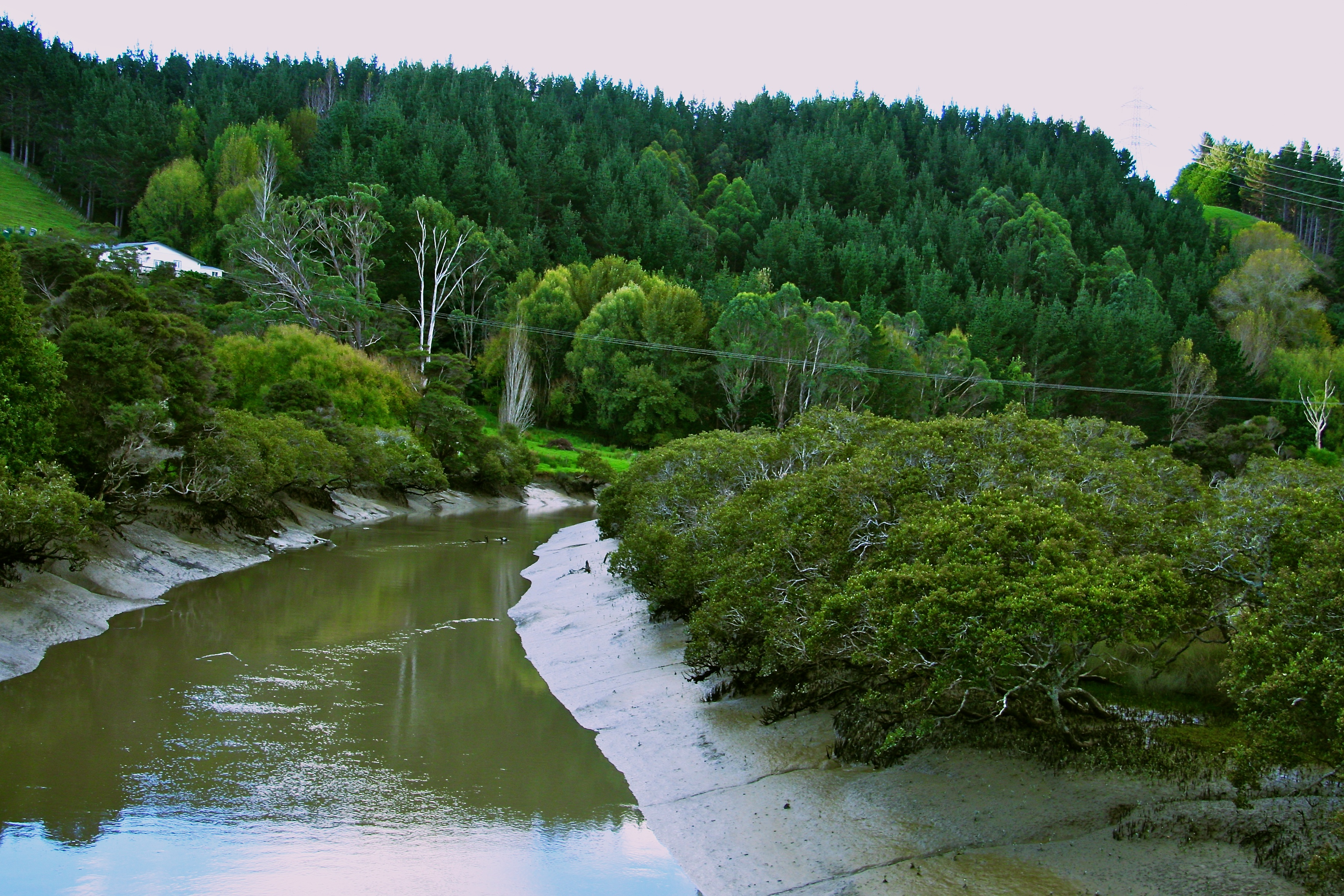

- Mouth of the Kaukapakapa River Kaukapakapa River (New Zealand)
- Route of the Kaukapakapa River

Location
- Country: New Zealand
- Region: Auckland Region

Physical characteristics
- Source: Confluence of the Waipapakara Stream and Waitoki Stream
  - coordinates: 36.6317°S 174.5491°E
- Mouth: Kaipara River
  - coordinates: 36.645278°S 174.443611°E
- Length: 18 km (11 mi)

Basin features
- Progression: Kaukapakapa River → Kaipara River → Kaipara Harbour
- Tributaries
  - left: Waikaitamure Stream, Waikahikatea Stream, Ourauwhare River
  - right: Te Kuru Stream
- Bridges: Shanks Bridge

The Kaukapakapa River is a river of New Zealand's North Island. It flows west, reaching the southernmost point of the Kaipara Harbour close to the town of Helensville. The small township of Kaukapakapa lies on the banks of the river, some 5 kilometres (3 mi) from its mouth.

== Description ==
The Kaukapakapa River flows westward through farmland and the township of Kaukapakapa, before entering the Kaipara River near the mouth of the Kaipara River.

== See also ==
- List of rivers of New Zealand
