= Journal of Reinforced Plastics and Composites =

- Discipline: Materials science
- Language: English
- Edited by: G. Springer

Publication details
- History: 1982-present
- Publisher: SAGE Publications
- Frequency: Biweekly
- Impact factor: 3.710 (2020)

Standard abbreviations
- ISO 4: J. Reinf. Plast. Compos.

Indexing
- CODEN: JRPCDW
- ISSN: 0731-6844 (print); 1530-7964 (web)
- LCCN: 82645197
- OCLC no.: 8228265

Links
- Journal homepage; Online access; Online archive

The Journal of Reinforced Plastics and Composites is a peer-reviewed scientific journal that covers research in the field of materials science, especially plastics and composites. The editor-in-chief is G. Springer (Stanford University). It was established in 1982 and is currently published by SAGE Publications.

== Abstracting and indexing ==
The Journal of Reinforced Plastics and Composites is abstracted and indexed in Scopus, and the Science Citation Index Expanded. According to Journal Citation Reports, its 2020 impact factor is 3.710.
