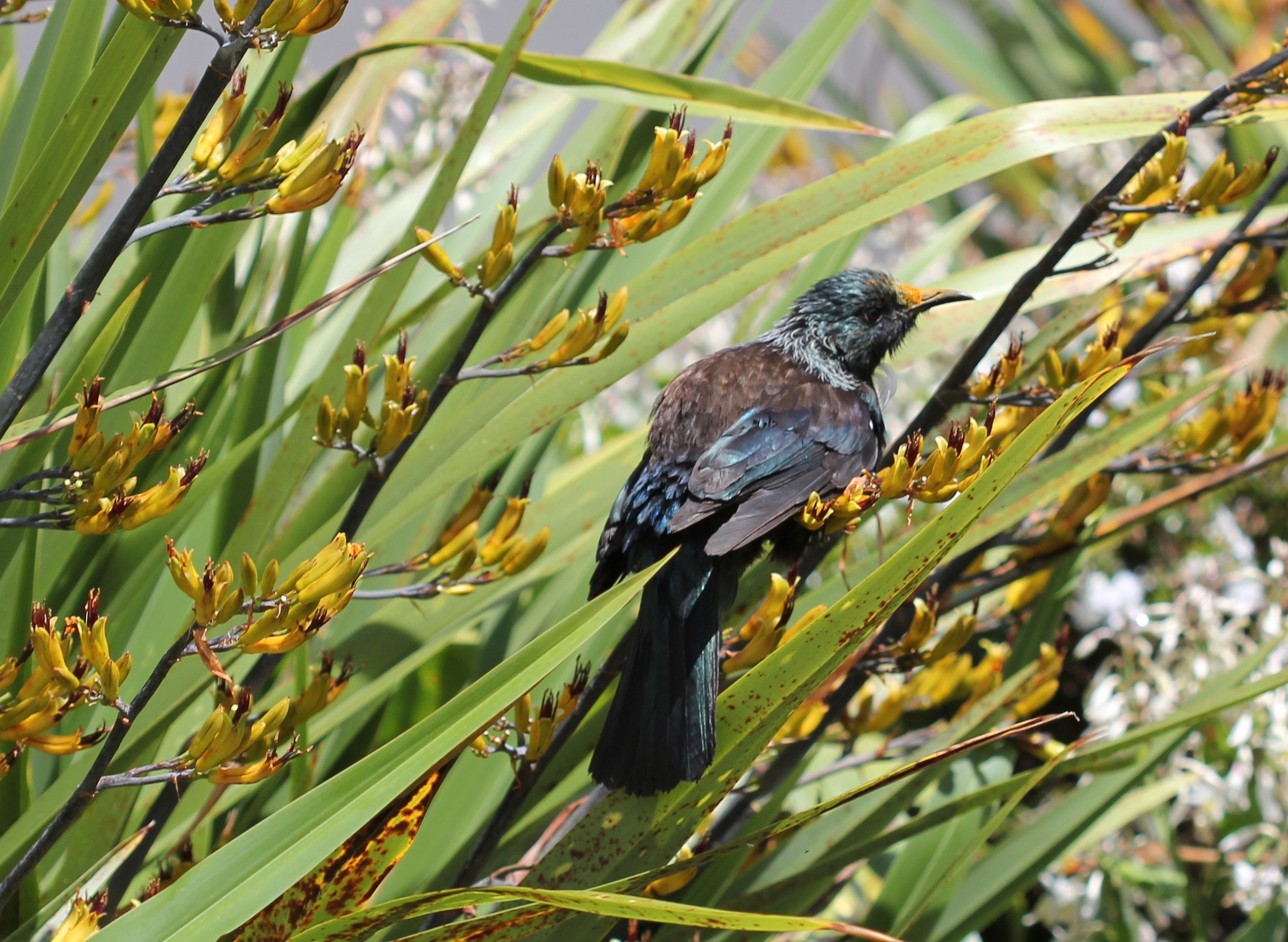
- Mountain flax being visited by a tūī

Scientific classification
- Kingdom: Plantae
- Clade: Tracheophytes
- Clade: Angiosperms
- Clade: Monocots
- Order: Asparagales
- Family: Asphodelaceae
- Subfamily: Hemerocallidoideae
- Genus: Phormium
- Species: P. colensoi

Binomial name
- Phormium colensoi Hook.f.

Synonyms
- Phormium cookianum Le Jol.; Phormium cookianum subsp. hookeri (Gunn ex Hook.f.) Wardle; Phormium forsterianum Hook. nom. nud.; Phormium hookeri Gunn ex Hook.f.

= Phormium colensoi =

Species of flowering plant

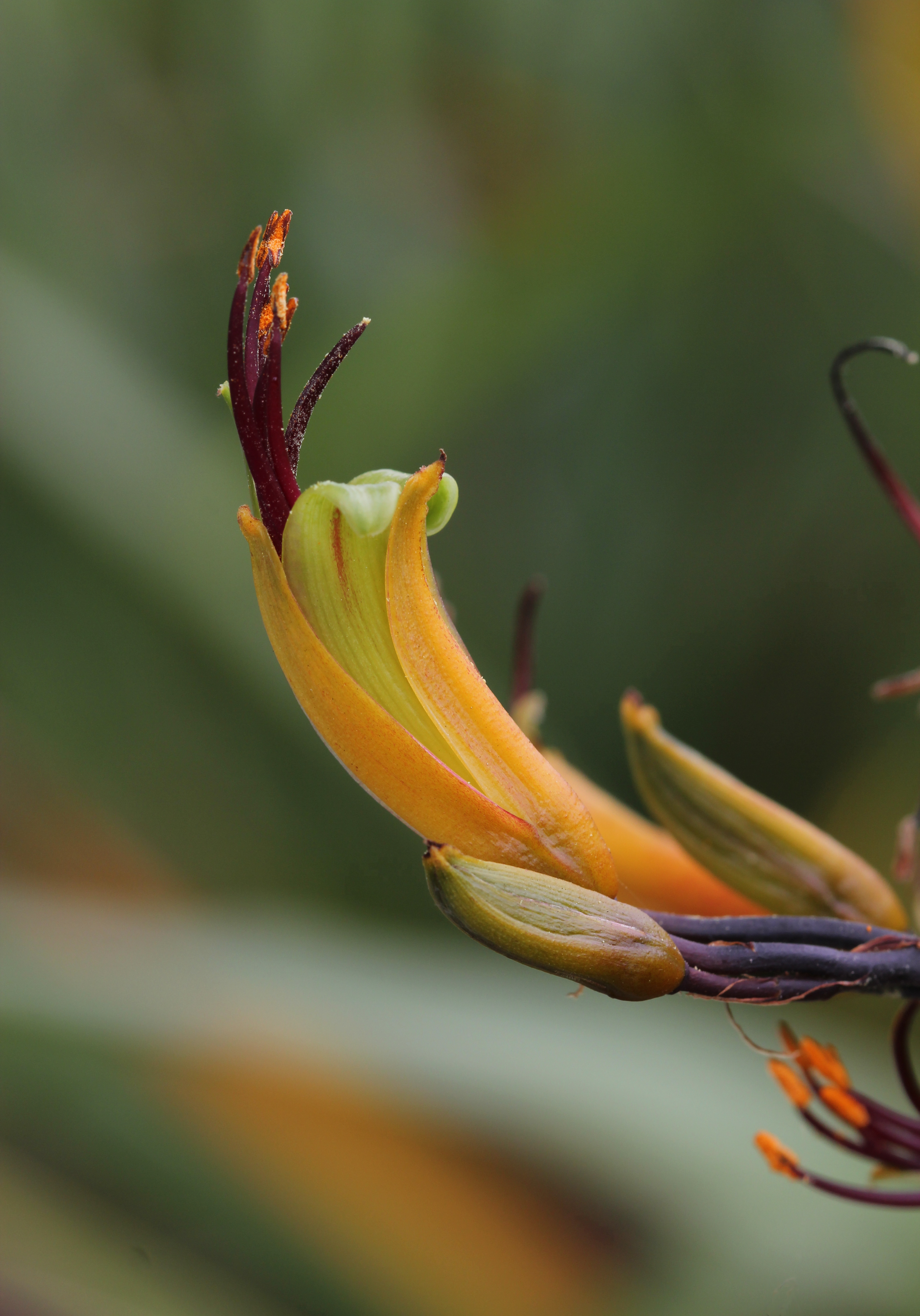
Flowers

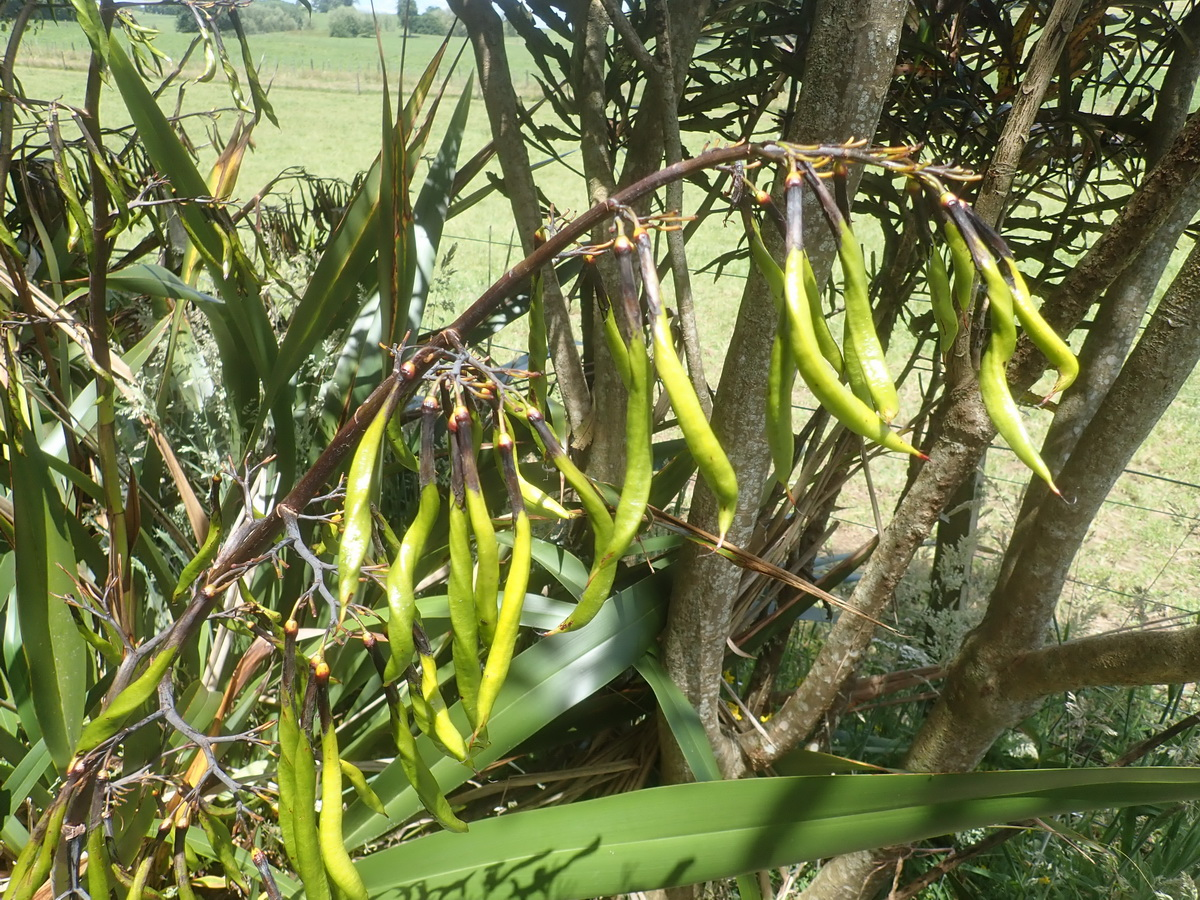
Pods

Phormium colensoi (syn. Phormium cookianum – see below), also called mountain flax, or wharariki in Māori, is a perennial plant that is endemic to New Zealand. The greenish, yellow or orange flowers are followed by twisted seed pods. It is less common than the other Phormium species, P. tenax or harakeke. Mountain flax is also known as whararipi, whatariki, mangaeka, kōrari tuauru (Williams 1971), wauraki (Bell 1890 sic.), coastal flax, hill flax and lesser New Zealand flax.

== Description ==
The leaves are under 2 metres in length while those of P. tenax range from 1 to 3 metres in length. The scape is much shorter than that of P. tenax, rising up to 2 metres in height while that of P. tenax is around 5 metres in height. The colour of the inner tepals is green while the outer tepals are yellow to red. In contrast the tepals of P. tenax are a dull red, with the tips of the inner tepals being less strongly recurved. The capsules of P. colensoi, unlike those of P. tenax are twisted and pendulous, and may be twice as long (up to 20 cm in length). The numerous seeds in each pod are glossy black, flat and elongated with a frilled margin

Phormium colensoi has two distinct geographic forms, one occurring in lowland parts of the North Island, and the other in the southern and mountainous areas of the South Island as well as ranges in the North Island. The lowland form has green or yellow tepals and the mountain form has red tepals. In the Cook Strait area, both forms and intermediates can be found.

== Taxonomy ==
The species was originally mentioned without description by William Colenso, the name being given as Phormium forsterianum. It was later known as P. colensoi, a name that was listed without description in 1846 by Joseph Dalton Hooker. The name became better known from J. D. Hooker's 1864 publication in Handbook of the New Zealand Flora. However, previously, in 1848, Auguste François Le Jolis had described the species under the name P. cookianum, and for many years this name was thought to have priority over Hooker's name P. colensoi. The latter is now regarded as the accepted name by some, based on a brief description of the species in a quotation from J.D. Hooker in an article by Auguste Le Jolis in the Revue Horticole of 1 January 1848. Another specimen, believed to be identical to a plant found by Ronald Gunn at the Whanganui River in 1864, was described from a plant growing in a garden in Torquay, England in 1888 and given the name P. hookeri (later reduced to a subspecies under the name P. cookianum subsp. hookeri). This name is also now regarded as a synonym of P. colensoi by some. Phormium cookianum, however, is still the preferred name in Aotearoa New Zealand according to Ngā Tipu Aotearoa and The Flora of New Zealand, as studies of the complex morphological and genetic variation as well as hybridization, and hence taxonomy, of the genus are still underway.

== Uses ==
Wharariki is a taonga (sacred, treasure) species to Māori and numerous traditional cultivars have been used for various purposes. Refer to Ngā Tipu Whakaoranga [Māōri Plant Use Database] and the citations within and Te Kohinga Harakeke o Aotearoa – National New Zealand Flax Collection.

- Wharariki - a variety from Urewera has a superior fibre quality that may be woven into a soft kete [traditional Māori basket]. It has a slight yellow colouration when dried.
- Whakaari - a variety with leaves suitable for weaving kete, but less suitable than other cultivars for piupiu [Māori waist-to-knees garment made of flax - has a wide waistband and is used in modern times for kapa haka performances]. The leaves have strong blades and dry naturally to a deep green colour, or to a pale greenish-fawn after being boiled for a minute.

== Cultivars ==
Numerous cultivars of this species have been selected for cultivation (those marked agm have gained the Royal Horticultural Society's Award of Garden Merit):

- 'Black Adder'
- 'Cream Delight'agm
- 'Dark Delight' has deep-red leaves up to 1.2 metres in length
- 'Duet', a dwarf cultivar up to 30 cm in height with cream and green variegated foliage
- 'Flamingo'
- 'Golden Wonder'
- 'Maori Maiden' (also known as 'Rainbow Maiden'), an erect growing cultivar with leaves to 1 metre in length with bronze stripes
- 'Sundowner', a cultivar with very long leaves which are up to 1.8 metres long. These have a purple centre and cream edges.
- 'Tricolor',agm an upright cultivar that has leaves with red, yellow and green stripes. The flowers are pale yellowish-green.

There is also a dwarf cultivar, and hybrid cultivars have been selected from crosses with Phormium tenax. P. colensoi cultivars are regarded as less hardy than other Phormium cultivars.

== See also ==
- Exocarpic acid, a rare fatty acid found in the plant.
