= Māori people =

Indigenous Polynesian people of New Zealand

Māori
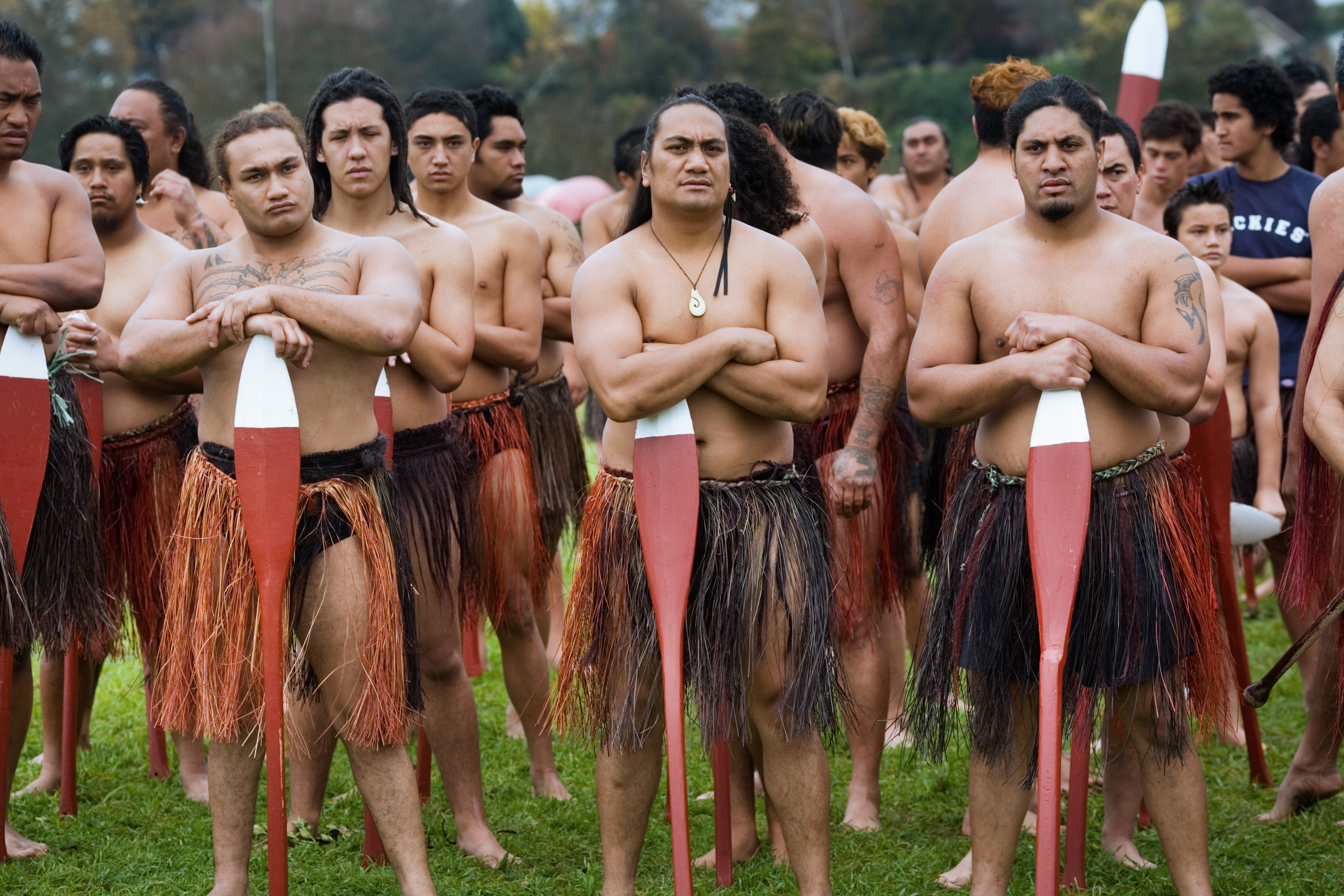

Regions with significant populations
- New Zealand: 978,246 (2023 census)
- Australia: 170,057 (2021 census)
- United Kingdom: approx. 8,000 (2000)
- United States: 3,500 (2000)
- Canada: 2,500 (2016)
- Other regions: approx. 8,000

Languages
- Māori, English, NZSL

Religion
- Mainly Christian or irreligious Rātana; Māori religions

Related ethnic groups
- Other Polynesian peoples; especially Native Hawaiians, Cook Island Māori, Moriori, Tahitians

Māori (Note: Māori: [ˈmaːɔɾi]; New Zealand English: /ˈmʌːori/ or /ˈmæʊɹiː/; UK English: /ˈmaʊri/. Also spelled Maori or, uncommonly, Maaori.) are the indigenous Polynesian people of mainland New Zealand. Māori are descended from East Polynesian settlers who arrived in New Zealand in several waves of canoe voyages between roughly 1320 and 1350. Over several centuries in isolation, these settlers developed a distinct culture, whose language, mythology, crafts, and performing arts evolved independently from those of other eastern Polynesian cultures. In the 15th century some of them moved to the Chatham Islands, where their descendants became New Zealand's other indigenous Polynesian ethnic group, the Moriori.

Early contact between Māori and Europeans, starting in the 18th century, ranged from beneficial trade to lethal violence; Māori actively adopted many technologies from the newcomers. With the signing of the Treaty of Waitangi in 1840, the two cultures coexisted for a generation. Rising tensions over disputed land sales led to conflict in the 1860s, and subsequent land confiscations, which Māori resisted fiercely. After the Treaty was declared a legal nullity in 1877, Māori were forced to assimilate into many aspects of Western culture. Social upheaval and epidemics of introduced disease took a devastating toll on the Māori population, which fell dramatically, but began to recover by the beginning of the 20th century. The March 2023 New Zealand census gives the number of people of Māori descent as 978,246 (19.6% of the total population), up from 18.5% in 2018. Of those identifying as Māori at the 2023 census, 366,015 people (41.2%) identified as of sole Māori ethnicity while 409,401 people (46.1%) identified as of both European and Māori ethnicity.

Efforts have been made, centring on the Treaty of Waitangi, to increase the standing of Māori in wider New Zealand society and achieve social justice. Traditional Māori culture has enjoyed a significant revival, which was further bolstered by a Māori protest movement that emerged in the 1960s. However, disproportionate numbers of Māori face significant economic and social obstacles, and generally have lower life expectancies and incomes than other New Zealand ethnic groups. They suffer higher levels of crime, health problems, imprisonment, poverty, and educational under-achievement. A number of socio-economic initiatives have been instigated with the aim of "closing the gaps" between Māori and other New Zealanders. Political and economic redress for historical grievances is also ongoing (see Treaty of Waitangi claims and settlements).

Māori are the second-largest ethnic group in New Zealand, after European New Zealanders (commonly known by the Māori name Pākehā). In addition, more than 170,000 Māori live in Australia. The Māori language is spoken to some extent by about a fifth of all Māori, representing three per cent of the total population. Māori are active in all spheres of New Zealand culture and society, with independent representation in areas such as media, politics, and sport.

== Naming and identification ==
In the Māori language, the word māori means 'normal', 'natural', or 'ordinary'. In legends and oral traditions, the word distinguished ordinary mortal human beings—tāngata māori—from deities and spirits (wairua). (Note: Māori has cognates in other Polynesian languages, such as Hawaiian maoli, Tahitian mā'ohi, and Cook Islands Māori māori, which all share similar meanings.) Likewise, wai māori denotes 'fresh water', as opposed to salt water. There are cognate words in most Polynesian languages, (Note: E.g. kanaka maoli, meaning native Hawaiian. (In the Hawaiian language, the Polynesian letter "T" regularly becomes a "K", and the Polynesian letter "R" regularly becomes an "L".)) all deriving from Proto-Polynesian *ma(a)qoli, which has the reconstructed meaning 'true, real, genuine'.

Early visitors from Europe to New Zealand generally referred to the indigenous inhabitants as "New Zealanders" or as "natives". Māori used the term Māori to describe themselves in a pan-tribal sense. (Note: The orthographic conventions developed by the Māori Language Commission (Te Taura Whiri i te Reo Māori) recommend the use of the macron (ā ē ī ō ū) to denote long vowels. Contemporary English-language usage in New Zealand tends to avoid the anglicised plural form of the word Māori with an "s": The Māori language generally marks plurals by changing the article rather than the noun, for example: te waka (the canoe); ngā waka (the canoes).) Māori people often use the term tangata whenua (literal meaning, "people of the land") to identify in a way that expresses their relationship with a particular area of land; a tribe may be the tangata whenua in one area, but not in another. The term can also refer to the Māori people as a whole in relation to New Zealand (Aotearoa) as a whole.

The official definition of Māori for electoral purposes has changed over time. Before 1974, the government required documented ancestry to determine the status of "a Māori person" and only those with at least 50% Māori ancestry were allowed to choose which seats they wished to vote in. The Māori Affairs Amendment Act 1974 changed this, allowing individuals to self-identify as to their cultural identity. Until 1986, the census required at least 50 per cent Māori ancestry to claim Māori affiliation. Currently, in most contexts, authorities require some documentation of ancestry or continuing cultural connection (such as acceptance by others as being of the people); however, there is no minimum ancestry requirement. (Note: In 2003, Christian Cullen became a member of the Māori rugby team despite having, according to his father, about 1/64 Māori ancestry.)

== History ==
=== Origins in Polynesia ===
The Māori settlement of New Zealand represents an end-point of a long chain of island-hopping voyages in the South Pacific.

No credible evidence exists of pre-Māori settlement of New Zealand. Compelling evidence from archaeology, linguistics, and physical anthropology indicates that the first settlers migrated from Polynesia and became the Māori. Evidence indicates that their ancestry (as part of the larger group of Austronesian peoples) stretches back 5,000 years, to the indigenous peoples of Taiwan. Polynesian people settled a large area encompassing Tonga, Samoa, Tahiti, Hawaiʻi, Easter Island (Rapa Nui) – and finally New Zealand.

The date of first arrival and settlement is a matter of debate. Radiocarbon dating of rat bones and rat-gnawed seeds and woody seed cases has indicated that Polynesian rats, and therefore humans, arrived circa 1280 AD. A 2022 study using radiocarbon technology found that settlement probably occurred in the North Island between 1250 and 1275. Confirmed archaeological evidence lags this though, as no human remains, artefacts or structures are confidently dated to earlier than an eruption of Mount Tarawera around 1314. A consideration of archaeological and genetic evidence hypothesised that, regardless of whether or not some settlers arrived earlier, the main settlement period was in the first half of the 14th century. This broadly aligns with analyses from Māori oral traditions, which describe the arrival of ancestors in large ocean-going canoes (waka) as a planned migration c. 1350.

There is definitive archaeological evidence of brief settlement as far south as Enderby Island, but there is no evidence of travel further south into Antarctic waters despite occasional speculation.

=== Early history ===
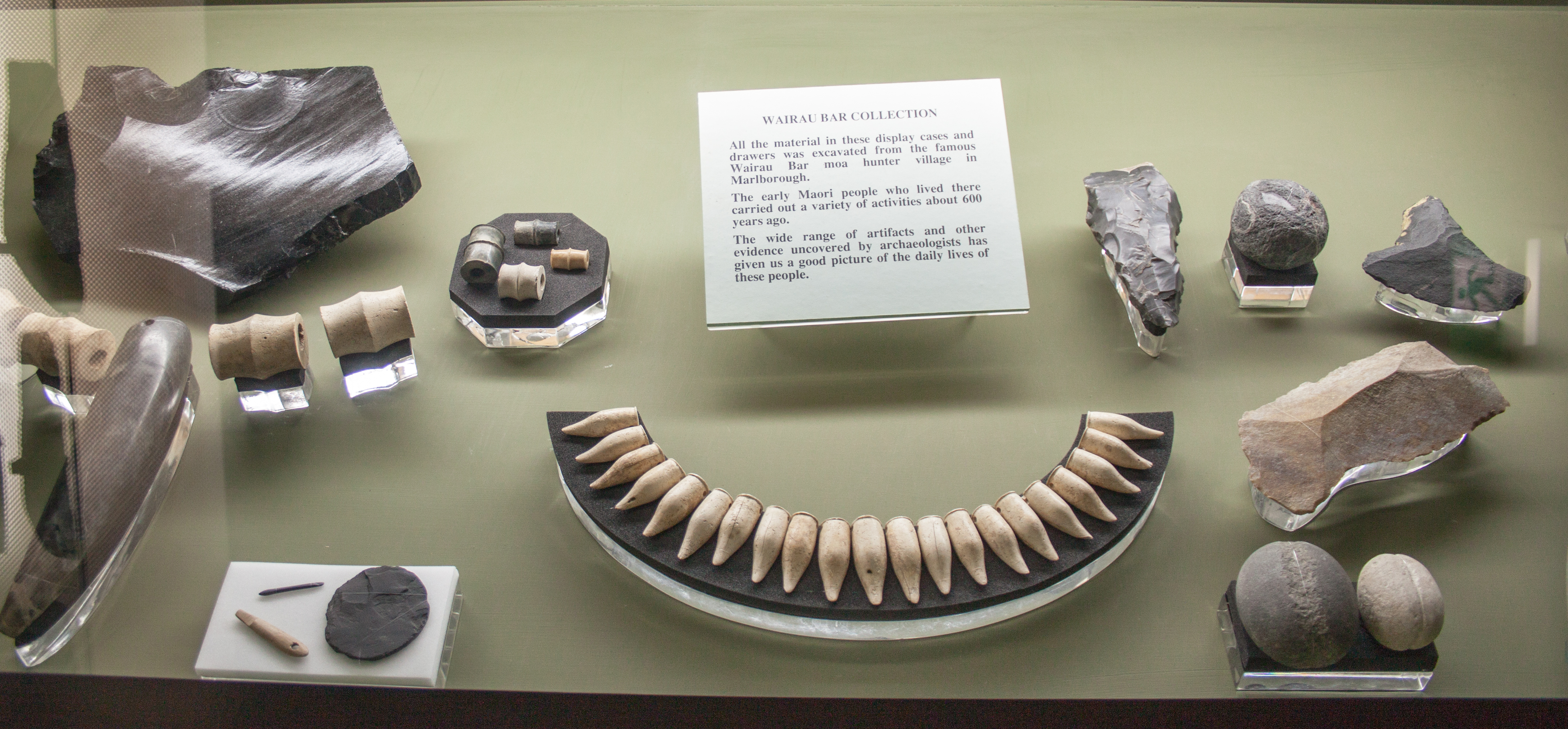
Early Archaic period artefacts from the Wairau Bar archaeological site, on display at the Canterbury Museum in Christchurch

The earliest period of Māori settlement, which has been called the "Colonisation phase", "East Polynesian" phase, the "Archaic" period, and the "Moahunter" period, dates from the time of arrival to c. 1500. The early Māori diet included an abundance of moa and other large birds and fur seals that had never been hunted before. This Archaic period is known for its distinctive "reel necklaces", and also remarkable for the lack of weapons and fortifications typical of the later "Classic" Māori. The best-known and most extensively studied Archaic site, at Wairau Bar in the South Island, shows evidence of occupation from the early 13th century to the early 15th century. It is the only known New Zealand archaeological site containing the bones of people who were born elsewhere.

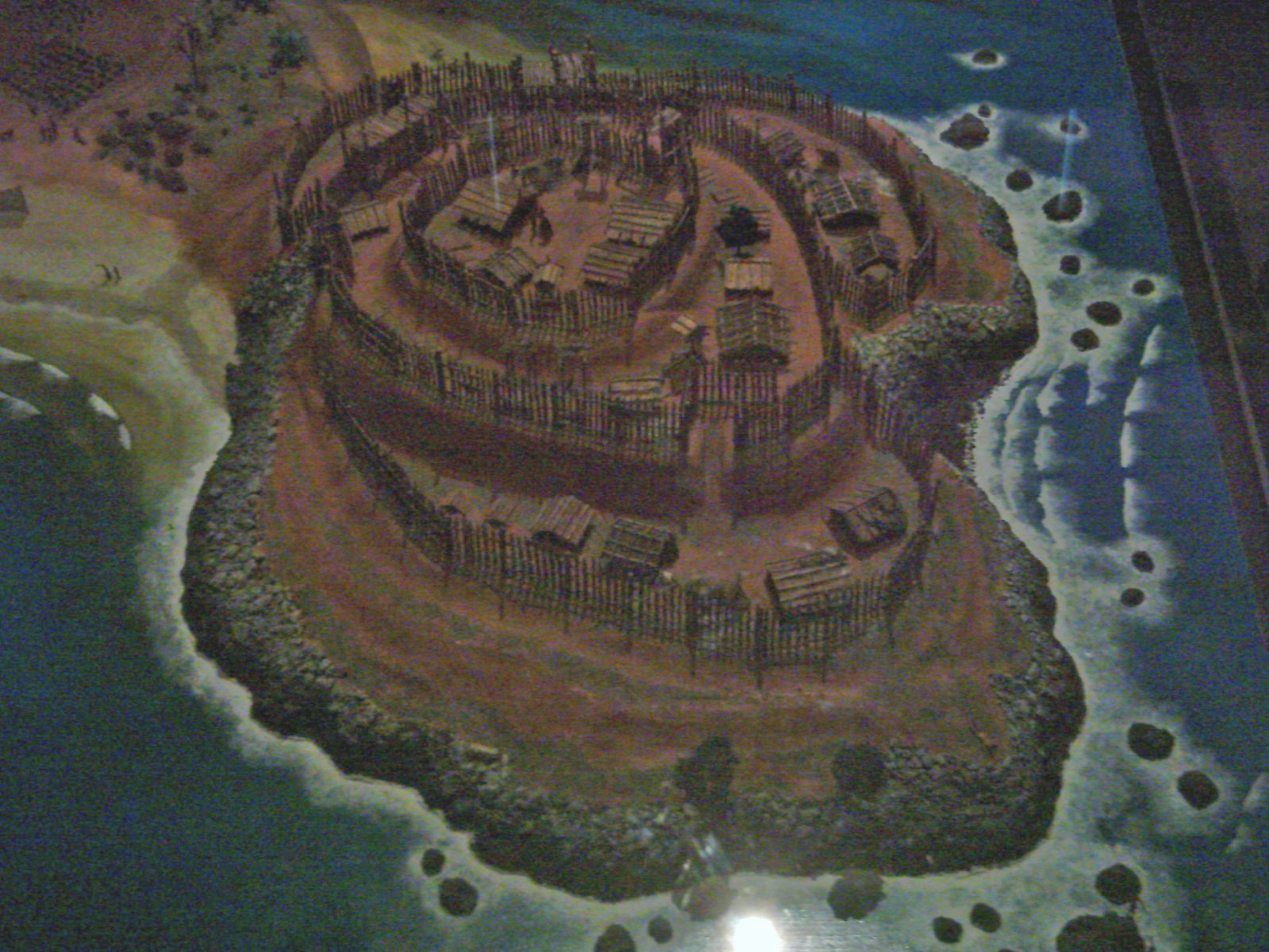
Model of a pā (hillfort) built on a headland. Pā proliferated as competition and warfare increased among a growing population.

Factors that operated in the transition to the Classic period (the culture at the time of European contact) include a significantly cooler period from 1500, and the extinction of the moa and of other food species.

The Classic period is characterised by finely made pounamu (greenstone) weapons and ornaments, elaborately carved war canoes and wharenui (meeting houses). Māori lived in autonomous settlements in extended hapū groups descended from common iwi ancestors. The settlements had farmed areas and food sources for hunting, fishing and gathering. Fortified pā were built at strategic locations due to occasional warfare over wrongdoings or resources; this practice varied over different locations throughout New Zealand, with more populations in the far north. There is a stereotype that Māori were 'natural warriors'; however, warfare and associated practices like cannibalism were not a dominant part of Māori culture.

Around the 15th century, a group of Polynesians migrated from New Zealand to the Chatham Islands and developed into a people known as the Moriori, with pacifism a key part of their culture.

=== Contact with Europeans ===
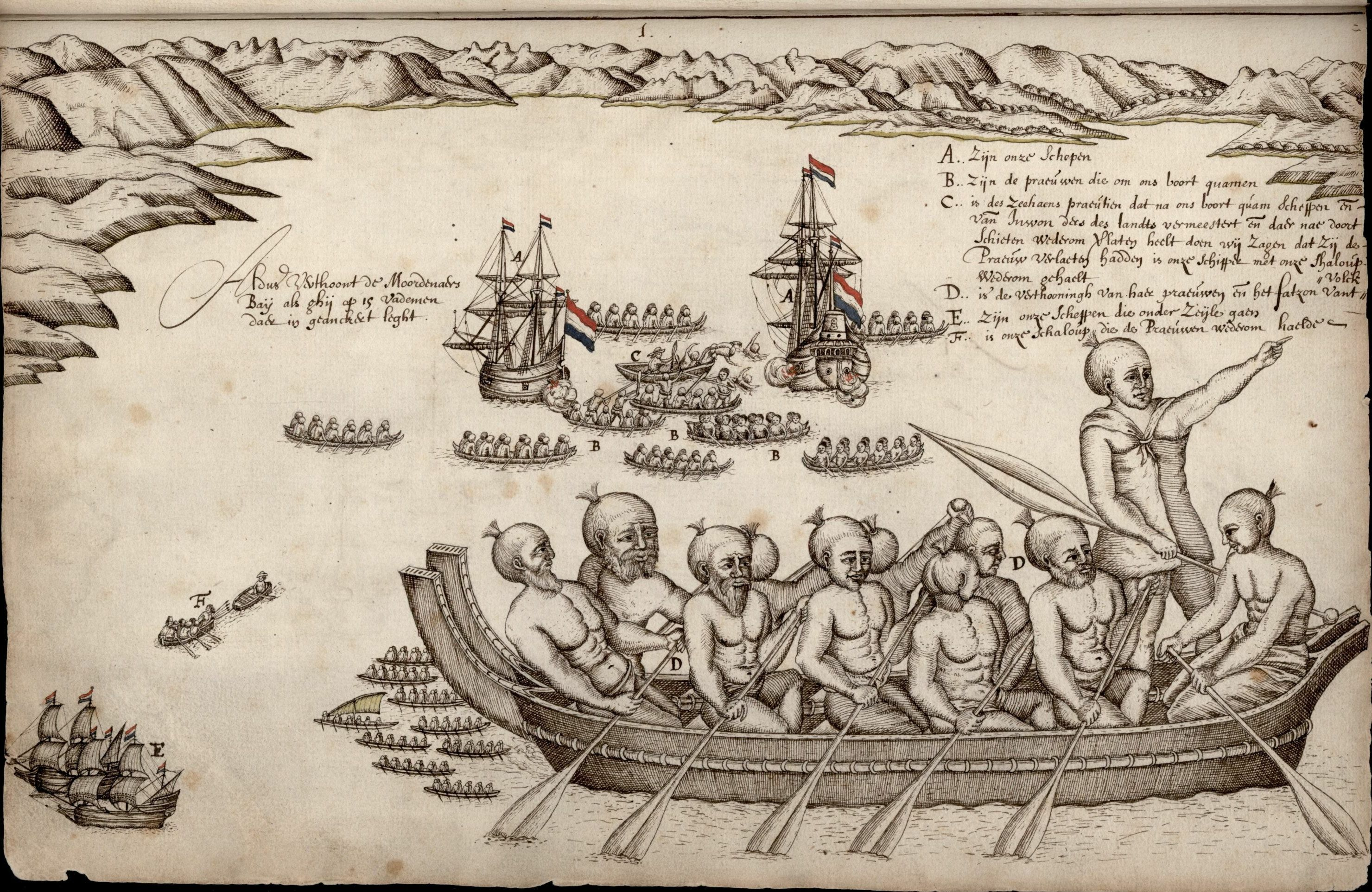
A drawing from Abel Tasman's travel journal of the first encounter between Europeans and Māori, in 1642

The first European explorers of New Zealand were Abel Tasman, who arrived in 1642, Captain James Cook, in 1769, and Marion du Fresne in 1772. Initial contact between Māori and Europeans proved problematic and sometimes fatal. Tasman left after only two days after four of his men and at least one Māori had been killed, apparently due to a misunderstanding. Cook's men shot at least eight Māori within three days of his first landing, although he later had good relations with Māori. Three years later, after a promising start, du Fresne and 26 men of his crew were killed. From the 1780s, Māori also increasingly encountered European and American sealers, whalers and Christian missionaries. Relations were mostly peaceful, although marred by several further violent incidents, the worst of which was the Boyd massacre in 1807 and subsequent revenge attacks.

European settlement in New Zealand began in the early 19th century, leading to an extensive sharing of culture and ideas. Many Māori valued Europeans, whom they called "Pākehā", as a means to acquire Western knowledge and technology. Māori quickly adopted writing as a means of sharing ideas, and many of their oral stories and poems were converted to the written form. The introduction of the potato revolutionised agriculture, and the acquisition of muskets by Māori iwi led to a period of particularly bloody intertribal warfare known as the Musket Wars, in which many groups were decimated and others driven from their traditional territory. The pacifist Moriori in the Chatham Islands similarly suffered massacre and subjugation in an invasion by some Taranaki iwi. At the same time, Māori suffered high mortality rates from Eurasian infectious diseases, such as influenza, smallpox and measles, which killed an estimated 10 to 50 per cent of Māori.

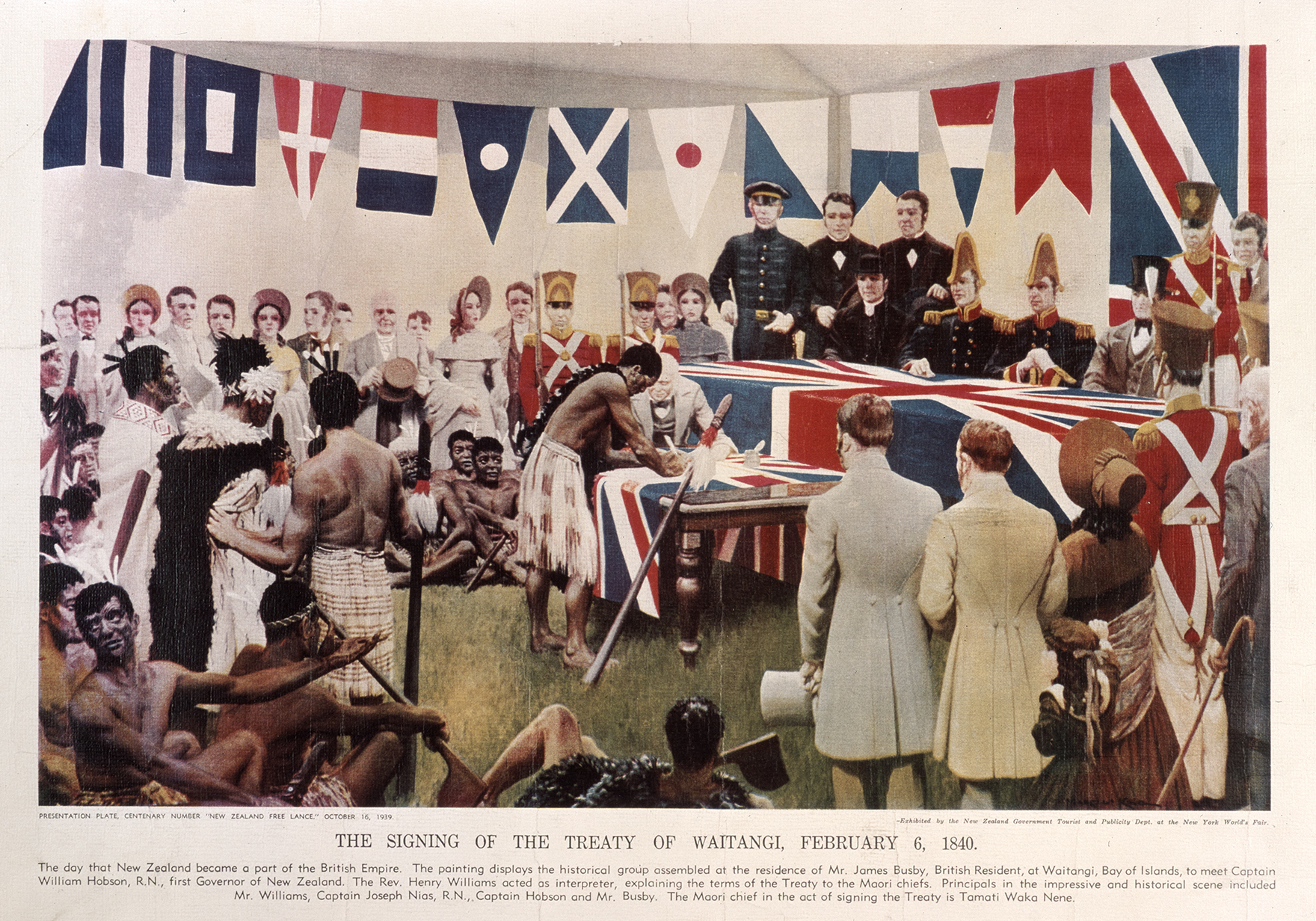
Depiction of the signing of the Treaty of Waitangi in 1840, bringing New Zealand and the Māori into the British Empire

By 1839, estimates placed the number of Europeans living in New Zealand as high as 2,000, and the British Crown acceded to repeated requests from missionaries and some Māori chiefs (rangatira) to intervene. The British government sent Royal Navy Captain William Hobson to negotiate a treaty between the British Crown and Māori, which became known as the Treaty of Waitangi. In 1840, starting on 6 February at Waitangi and by the end of the year at about 50 other events around the country, this treaty was signed by the Crown and over 500 rangatira Māori. The Treaty gave Māori the rights of British subjects and guaranteed Māori property rights and tribal autonomy, in return for accepting British sovereignty and the annexation of New Zealand as a colony in the British Empire. However, disputes continue over aspects of the Treaty of Waitangi, including wording differences in the two versions (in English and Māori), as well as misunderstandings of different cultural concepts; notably, the Māori version did not cede sovereignty to the British Crown. In an 1877 court case the Treaty was declared a "simple nullity" on the grounds that the signatories had been "primitive barbarians".

Nevertheless, relations between Māori and Pākehā (New Zealand Europeans) during the early colonial period were largely peaceful. Many Māori groups set up substantial businesses, supplying food and other products for domestic and overseas markets. When violence did break out, as in the Wairau Affray, Flagstaff War, Hutt Valley Campaign and Wanganui Campaign, it was generally limited and concluded with a peace treaty. However, by the 1860s rising settler numbers and tensions over disputed land purchases led to the later New Zealand wars, fought by the colonial government against numerous Māori iwi using local and British Imperial troops, and some allied iwi. These conflicts resulted in the colonial government confiscating tracts of Māori land as punishment for what were called "rebellions". Pākehā settlers would occupy the confiscated land. Several minor conflicts arose after the wars, including the incident at Parihaka in 1881 and the Dog Tax War from 1897 to 1898. The Native Land Court was established to transfer Māori land from communal ownership into individual title as a means to assimilation and to facilitate greater sales to European settlers.

=== Decline and revival ===
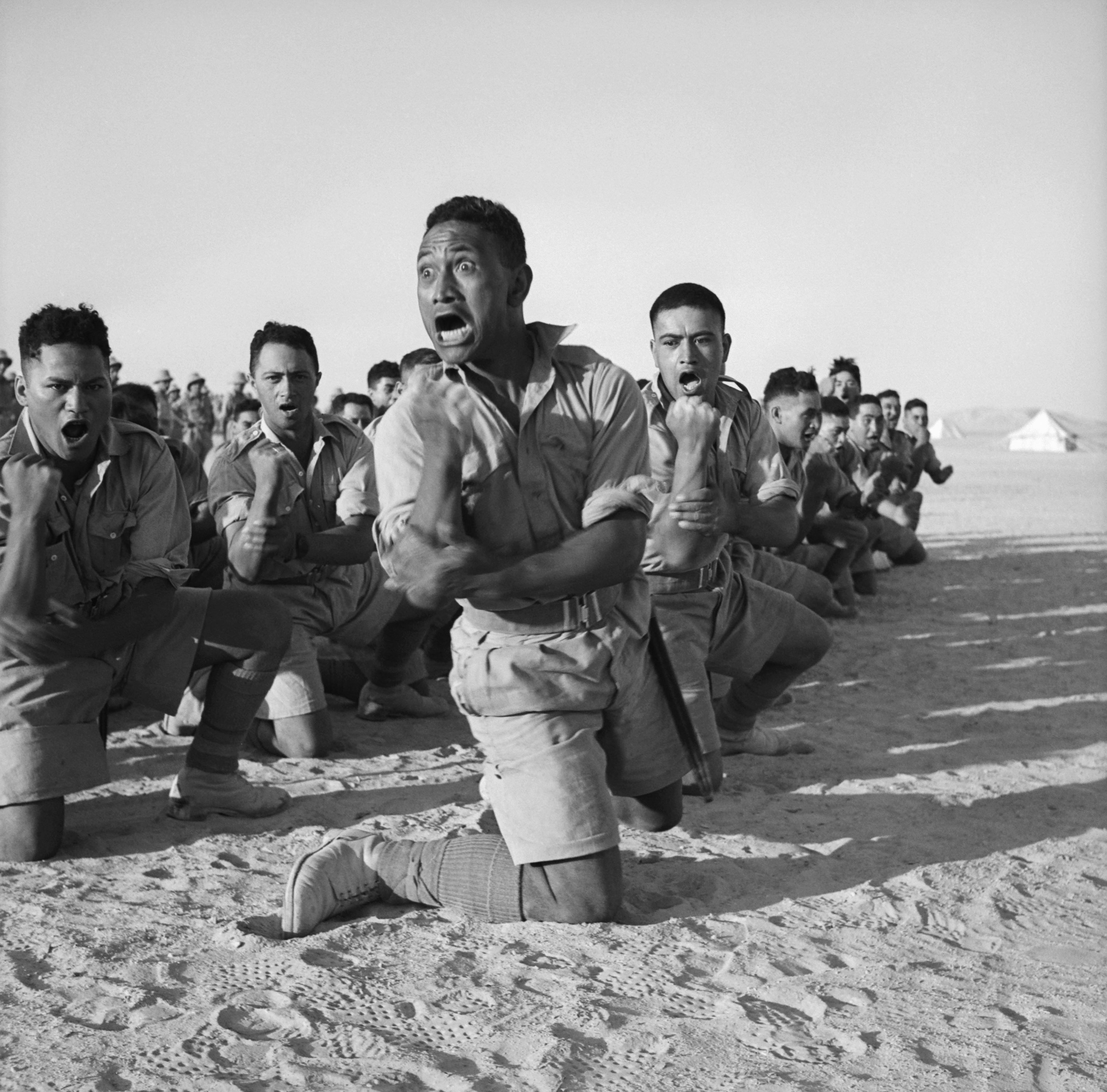
Members of the 28th Māori Battalion performing a haka (dance) in 1941

By the late 19th century, a widespread belief existed amongst both Pākehā and Māori that the Māori population would cease to exist as a separate race or culture, and become assimilated into the European population. From the late 19th to the mid-20th century various laws, policies, and practices were instituted in New Zealand society with the effect of inducing Māori to conform to Pākehā norms; notable among these are the Tohunga Suppression Act 1907 and the suppression of the Māori language by schools, often enforced with corporal punishment. In the 1896 census, New Zealand had a Māori population of 42,113, by which time Europeans numbered more than 700,000.

The rapid decline did not continue and the Māori population continued to recover in the 20th century. Influential Māori politicians such as James Carroll, Āpirana Ngata, Te Rangi Hīroa and Māui Pōmare aimed to revitalise the Māori people after the devastation of the previous century. They believed the future path called for a degree of assimilation, with Māori adopting European practices such as Western medicine, while also retaining traditional cultural practices. Māori also fought during both World Wars in specialised battalions (the Māori Pioneer Battalion in WWI and the 28th (Māori) Battalion in WWII). Māori were also badly hit by the 1918 influenza epidemic, with death rates for Māori being five to seven times higher than for Pākehā.

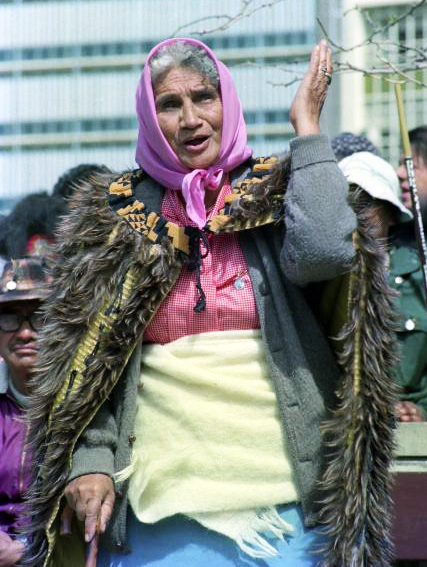
Whina Cooper leading the Māori Land March in 1975, seeking redress for historical grievances

Since the 1960s, Māoridom has undergone a cultural revival concurrent with activism for social justice and a protest movement. Kōhanga reo (Māori language pre-schools) were established in 1982 to promote Māori language use and halt the decline in its use. Two Māori language television channels broadcast content in the Māori language, while words such as "kia ora" have entered widespread use in New Zealand English.

Government recognition of the growing political power of Māori and political activism have led to limited redress for historic land confiscations. In 1975, the Crown set up the Waitangi Tribunal to investigate historical grievances, and since the 1990s the New Zealand government has negotiated and finalised treaty settlements with many iwi across New Zealand. By June 2008, the government had provided over NZ$900 million in settlements, much of it in the form of land deals. There is a growing Māori leadership who are using these settlements as an investment platform for economic development.

Despite a growing acceptance of Māori culture in wider New Zealand society, treaty settlements have generated significant controversy. Some Māori have argued that the settlements occur at a level of between one and two-and-a-half cents on the dollar of the value of the confiscated lands, and do not represent adequate redress. Conversely, some non-Māori denounce the settlements and socioeconomic initiatives as amounting to race-based preferential treatment. Both of these sentiments were expressed during the New Zealand foreshore and seabed controversy in 2004.

=== Māori King movement ===
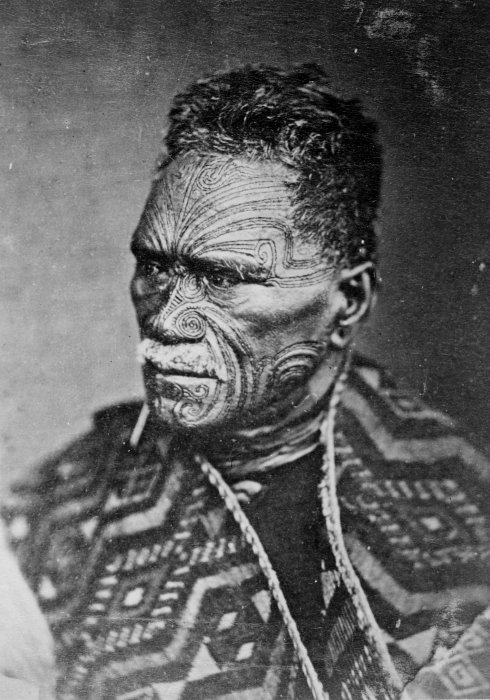
Tāwhiao, the second Māori king, reigned from 1860 to 1894.

The Māori King movement, called the Kīngitanga (Note: Also spelled Kiingitanga. The preferred orthography of the Waikato-Tainui iwi is to use doubled vowels rather than macrons to indicate long vowels.) in Māori, arose among some of the Māori iwi in the central North Island in the 1850s, to establish a role similar in status to that of the monarch of the British colonists, as a way of halting the alienation of Māori land. The Māori monarch operates in a non-constitutional capacity with no legal or judicial power within the New Zealand government. Reigning monarchs retain the position of paramount chief of several iwi and wield some power over these, especially within Tainui.

The current Māori monarch, Nga wai hono i te po, was elected in 2024. Her official residence is Tūrongo House at Tūrangawaewae marae in the town of Ngāruawāhia. She is the eighth monarch since the position was created and is the continuation of a dynasty that reaches back to the inaugural king, Pōtatau Te Wherowhero.

The movement arose among a group of central North Island iwi in the 1850s as a means of attaining Māori unity to halt the alienation of land at a time of rapid population growth by European colonists. The movement sought to establish a monarch who could claim status similar to that of Queen Victoria and thus allow Māori to deal with Pākehā (Europeans) on equal footing. It took on the appearance of an alternative government with its own flag, newspaper, bank, councillors, magistrates and law enforcement. But it was viewed by the colonial government as a challenge to the supremacy of the British monarchy, leading in turn to the 1863 invasion of Waikato, which was partly motivated by a drive to neutralise the Kīngitanga's power and influence. Following their defeat at Ōrākau in 1864, Kīngitanga forces withdrew into the Ngāti Maniapoto tribal region of the North Island that became known as the King Country. The Māori monarch's influence has not been as strong as it could be, partially due to the lack of affiliation to the Kīngitanga of key iwi, most notably Tūhoe, Ngāti Porou, and the largest iwi of all, Ngāpuhi.

== Demographics ==
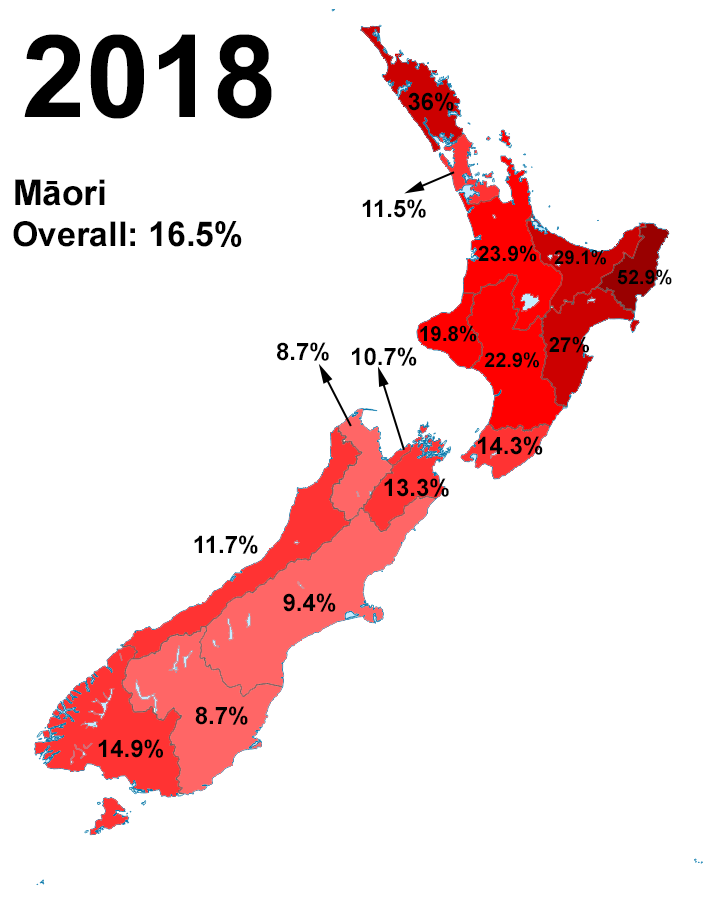
Māori in New Zealand in 2018

Māori New Zealanders population pyramid in 2018

Under the Māori Affairs Amendment Act 1974, a Māori is defined as "a person of the Māori race of New Zealand; and includes any descendant of such a person". The Māori population around the late 18th century was estimated by James Cook at 100,000. Historian Michael King suggests a slightly higher figure of 110,000 is more likely. Their numbers declined during the 19th century, to as low as 42,000; the decline has been attributed to the impact of European colonisation, including new diseases. Thereafter the population grew rapidly.

There were 887,493 people identifying as being part of the Māori ethnic group at the 2023 New Zealand census, making up 17.8% of New Zealand's population. This is an increase of 111,657 people (14.4%) since the 2018 census, and an increase of 288,891 people (48.3%) since the 2013 census. The large increase between the 2013 and 2018 census was mainly due to Statistics New Zealand starting to add ethnicity data from other sources (previous censuses, administrative data, and imputation) to the census data to reduce the number of non-responses.

The median age of Māori was 26.8 years, compared with 38.1 years for New Zealand as a whole. 262,422 people (29.6%) were aged under 15 years, 223,860 (25.2%) were 15 to 29, 336,486 (37.9%) were 30 to 64, and 64,725 (7.3%) were 65 or older.

In terms of population distribution, 753,384 (84.9%) Māori lived in the North Island at the 2023 census and 133,656 (15.1%) lived in the South Island. Five districts had a majority Māori population: Chatham Islands territory (68.6%), Wairoa district (68.5%), Ōpōtiki district (66.2%), Kawerau district (63.2%) and Gisborne district (54.8%). The Upper Harbour local board area in Auckland has the lowest concentration of Māori people at 6.1%, followed by the Devonport-Takapuna local board area (6.2%) and the Howick local board area (6.3%), The Queenstown-Lakes District had the lowest concentration of Māori outside Auckland at 6.4%.

Of those identifying as Māori at the 2023 census, 366,015 people (41.2%) identified as of sole Māori ethnicity while 409,401 people (46.1%) identified as of both European and Māori ethnicity, due to the high rate of intermarriage between the two ethnicities.

The largest iwi by population at the 2023 census was Ngāpuhi (184,470), followed by Ngāti Porou (102,480), Ngāti Kahungunu (95,751) and Waikato (94,698). However, over 110,000 people of Māori descent could not identify their iwi.

Outside of New Zealand, a large Māori population exists in Australia. There were 170,057 Australians identifying as Māori at the 2021 Australian census, with 65,031 living in Queensland, 39,714 living in New South Wales and 31,044 living in Western Australia. Smaller communities also exist in the United Kingdom (approx. 8,000), the United States (up to 3,500) and Canada (approx. 2,805).

== Culture ==
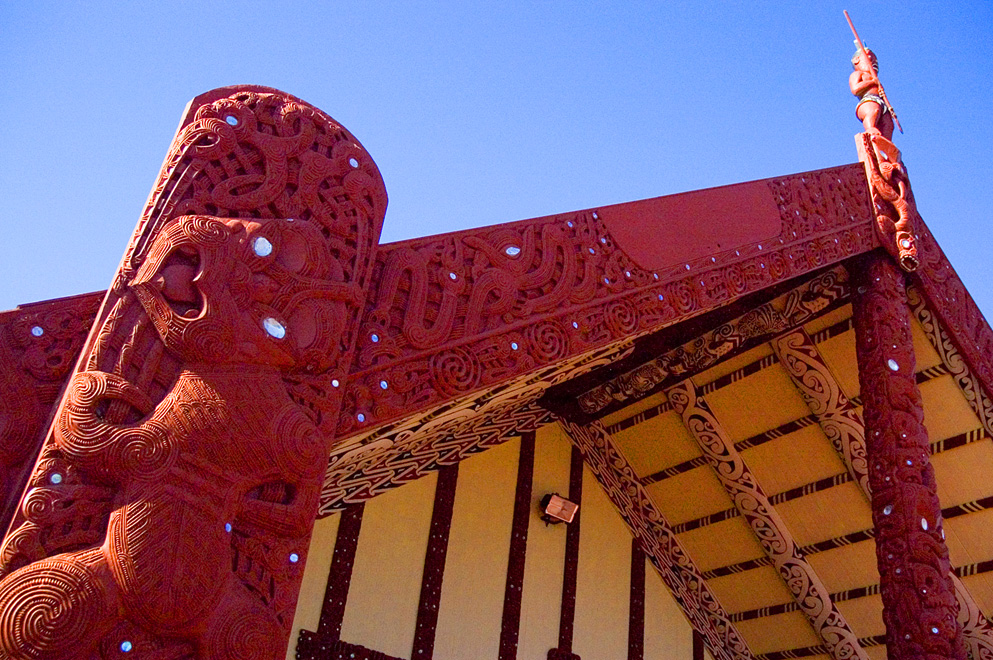
Wharenui (meeting house) at Ōhinemutu village, Rotorua (tekoteko on the top)

Māori culture forms a distinctive part of New Zealand culture and, due to a large diaspora and the incorporation of Māori motifs into popular culture, is found throughout the world. Contemporary Māori culture comprises traditional as well as 20th-century influences.

=== Traditional culture ===
Archaeological record indicates a gradual evolution of culture. In the course of a few centuries, the growing population led to competition for resources and an increase in warfare and an increased frequency of fortified pā. Various systems also arose aimed to conserve resources; most of these, such as tapu and rāhui, used religious or supernatural threats to discourage people from taking species at particular seasons or from specified areas.

Warfare between tribes was common, and Māori would sometimes eat their conquered enemies or enslave them. Performing arts such as the haka developed from their Polynesian roots, as did carving and weaving. Regional dialects arose, with differences in vocabulary and in the pronunciation of some words but the language retained enough similarities to other Eastern Polynesian languages for Tupaia, the Tahitian navigator on James Cook's first voyage in the region to act as an interpreter between Māori and the crew of the Endeavour.

=== Belief and religion ===
Religious affiliation
| No religion | 53.5% |
| Christian | 29.9% |
| Māori religions | 7.7% |
| Other religion | 1.4% |
| Buddhism | 0.2% |
| Islam | 0.1% |
| Hinduism | 0.1% |

Traditional Māori beliefs have their origins in Polynesian culture. Concepts such as tapu (sacred), noa (non-sacred), mana (authority/prestige) and wairua (spirit) governed everyday Māori living, and there are also many Māori deities. Today, some Māori follow a variety of Christian faiths such as Presbyterianism, The Church of Jesus Christ of Latter-day Saints, Māori Christian groups such as Rātana and Ringatū, and also Catholic, Anglican and Methodist denominations. At the 2018 New Zealand census, 7.7 per cent of Māori were affiliated with Māori religions, beliefs, and philosophies; 29.9 per cent with Christian denominations and 53.5 per cent of Māori claimed no religion. Proportions of Christian and irreligious Māori are comparable with European New Zealanders.

Many Māori people observe spiritual traditions such as tapu and noa. Certain objects, areas, or buildings are tapu (spiritually restricted), and must be made noa (unrestricted) by ceremonial action. It is common practice, for instance, to remove one's shoes before entering a wharenui (meeting-house), a token of respect for the ancestors who are represented and spiritually present within the wharenui. Another spiritual ritual is hurihanga takapau (purification), practised when fishing to ensure there is no tapu on the fish.

=== Performing arts ===
Cultural performance of waiata (song), haka (dance), tauparapara (chants) and mōteatea (poetry) are used by Māori to express and pass on knowledge and understanding about history, communities, and relationships. Kapa haka is a Māori performance art believed to have originated with the legendary figure Tinirau. It was performed for tourists following European contact, starting in the 1880s; this sometimes involved adaptations to make it more familiar to European audiences. It was used in the First World War to raise money for the Maori Soldiers' Fund encouraged by Āpirana Ngata. A haka is often performed in a pōwhiri (welcoming ceremony).

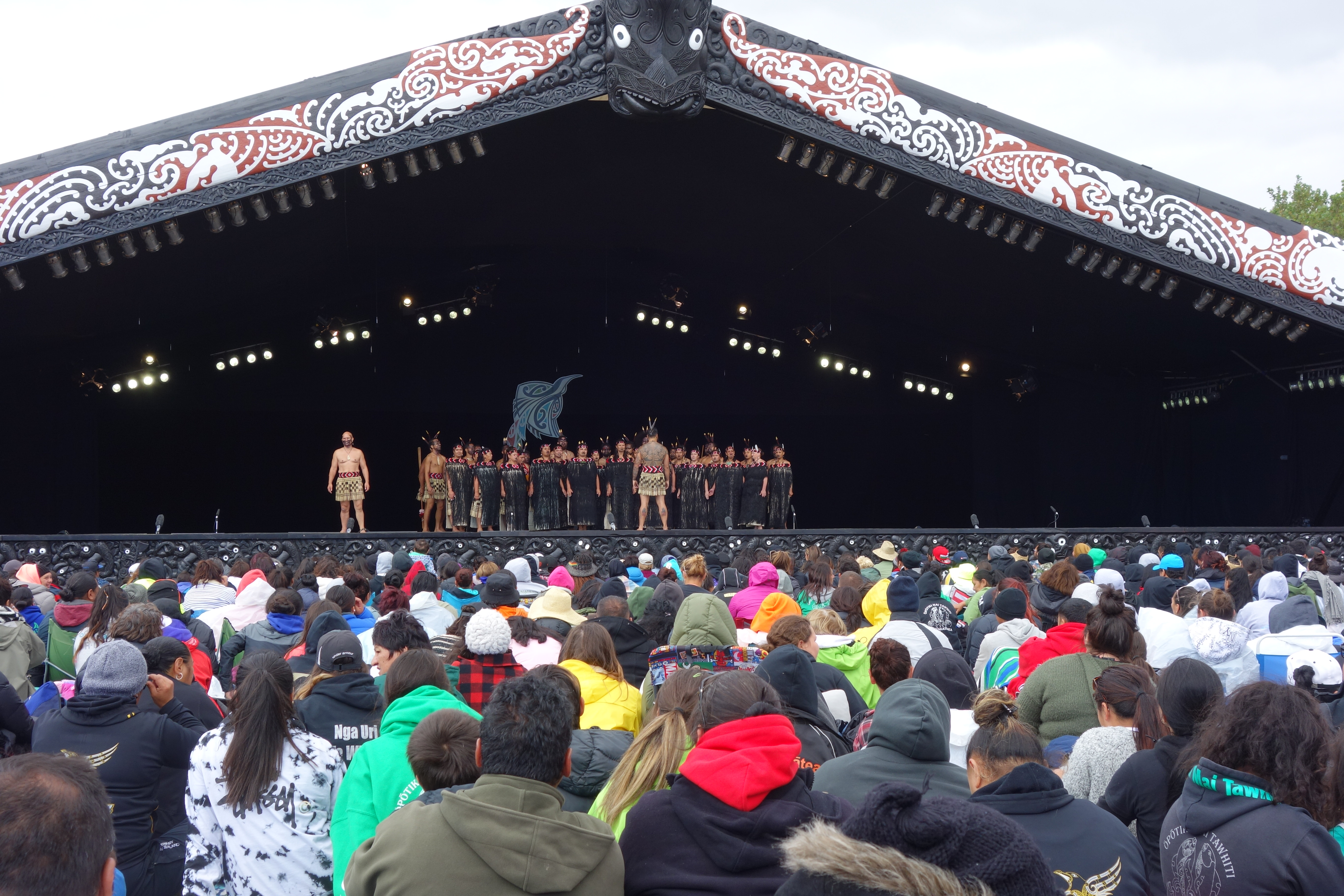
Te Matatini 2015 in Hagley Park, Christchurch

Since 1972, there has been a regular national kapa haka competition, the Te Matatini National Festival, organised by the Aotearoa Traditional Māori Performing Arts Society. There are kapa haka groups in schools, tertiary institutions, and workplaces, and it is performed at tourist venues across the country.

Whare tapere (entertainment houses) were a site of story-telling, dance, and puppetry in pre-European Māori culture. Māori theatre and contemporary dance flourished in the 1970s and 1980s with groups such as Te Ohu Whakaari, Te Ika a Maui Players and Taki Rua. Contemporary Māori stage writers, actors and directors include George Henare, Riwia Brown, Hone Kouka, Nancy Brunning, Jim Moriarty, Briar Grace-Smith, and many others. Contemporary performing arts include theatre companies Taki Rua, Tawata Productions who run an annual playwriting festival for indigenous writers called Breaking Ground, and dance companies, Atamira Dance Company and Okareka Dance Company. In Auckland there is Te Pou, a kaupapa Māori performing arts venue that develops and partners with Māori theatre makers.

Traditional Māori instruments are taonga pūoro. They fulfilled various roles including storytelling, religious traditions and also daily functions such as the beginning of a new day. Taonga pūoro fall into two areas, melodic instruments such as the flute and rhythmic instruments such as poi "balls of dried flax on string that are swung and tapped".

Prominent Māori music artists and groups include Stan Walker, Maisey Rika, Young Sid, William Singe, Teeks, Ria Hall, Rob Ruha, Pieter T, Alien Weaponry, Sons of Zion, 1814 and Maimoa.

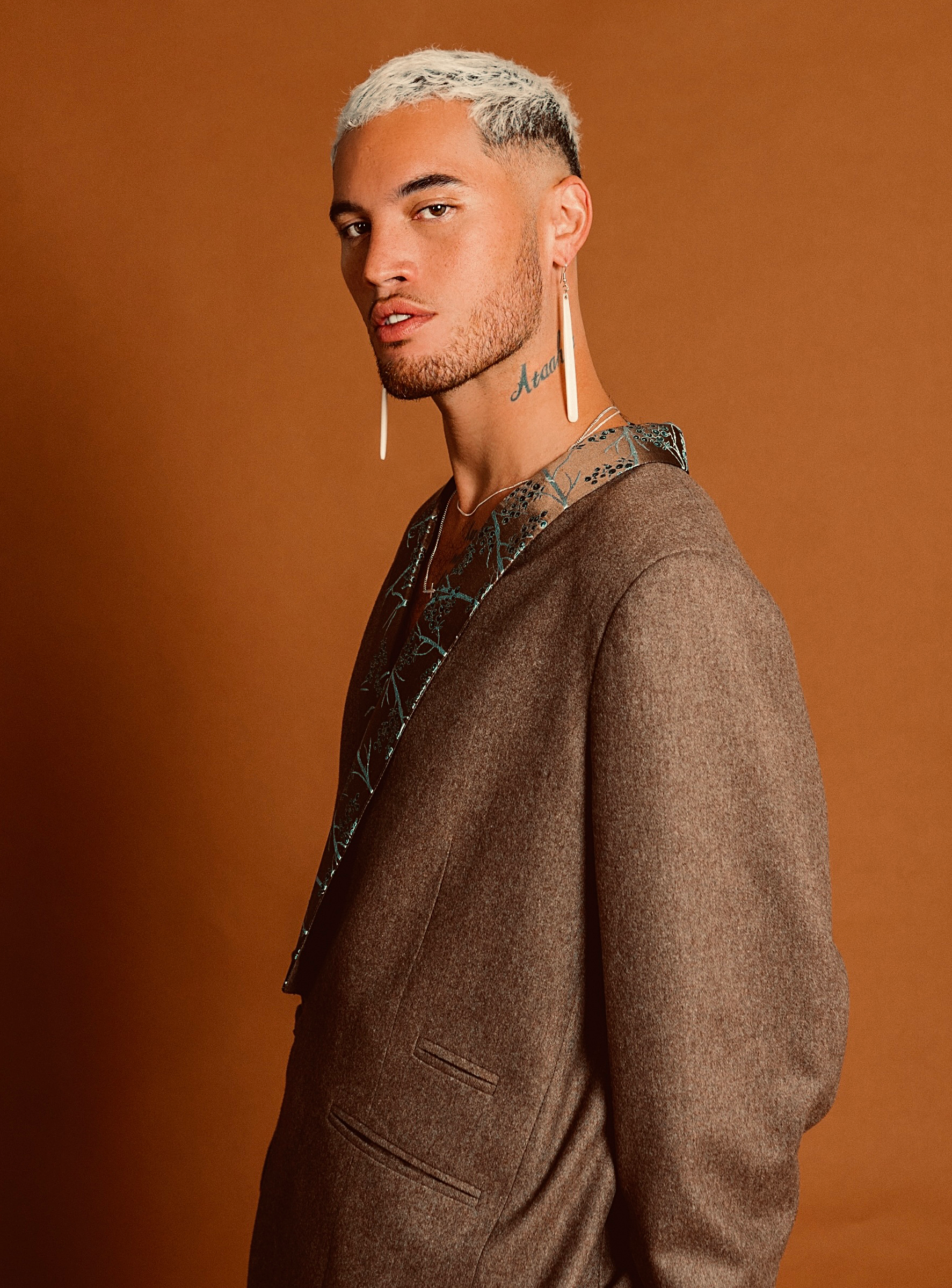
Stan Walker

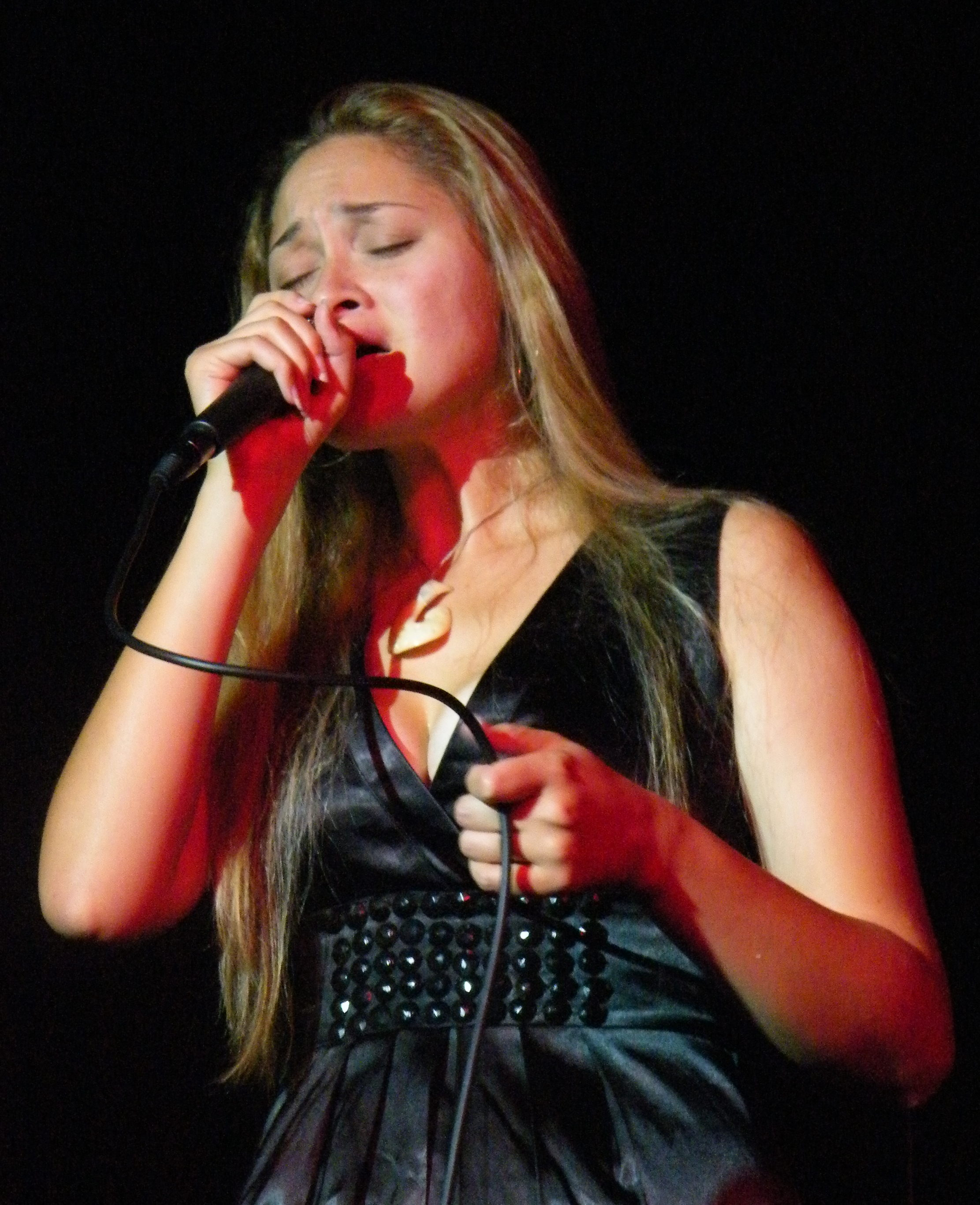
Maisey Rika

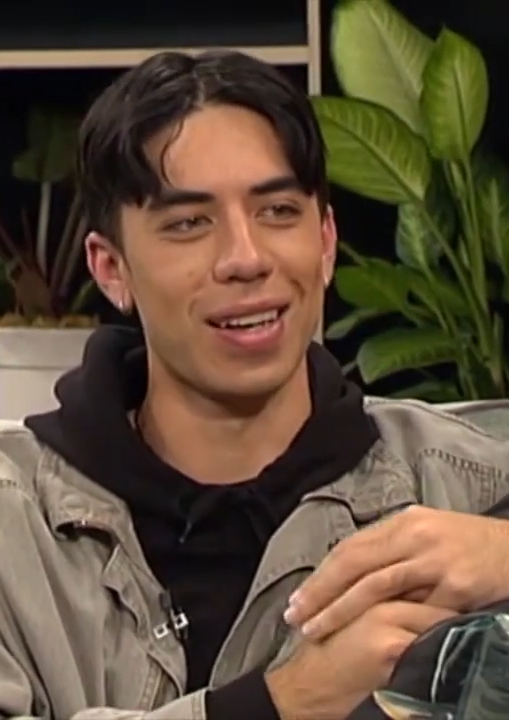
Teeks

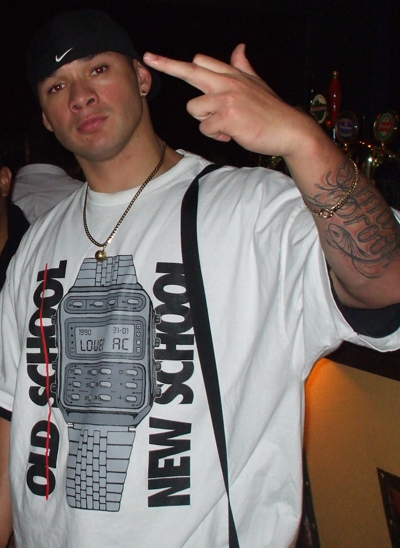
Young Sid

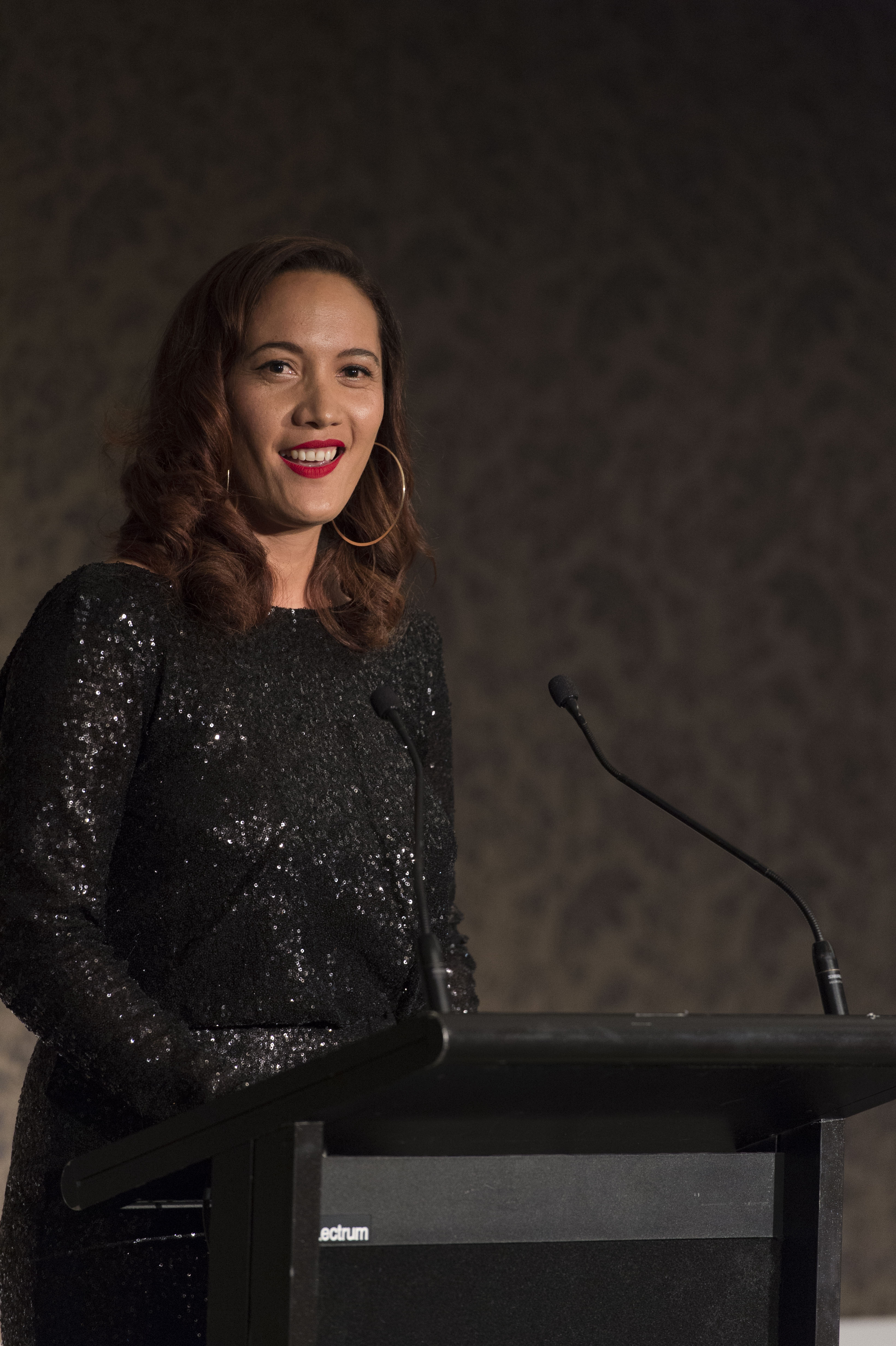
Ria Hall

=== Literature and media ===
Like other cultures, oral folklore was used by Māori to preserve their stories and beliefs through many centuries. In the 19th century, European-style literacy was brought to the Māori, which led to Māori history documentation in books, novels and later television. Māori language use began to decline in the 20th century with English as the language through which Māori literature became widespread.

Notable Māori novelists include Patricia Grace, Witi Ihimaera and Alan Duff. Once Were Warriors, a 1994 film adapted from a 1990 novel of the same name by Alan Duff, brought the plight of some urban Māori to a wide audience. It was the highest-grossing film in New Zealand until 2006, and received international acclaim, winning several international film prizes. While some Māori feared that viewers would consider the violent male characters an accurate portrayal of Māori men, most critics praised it as exposing the raw side of domestic violence.

Other major films with Māori themes or subjects include Utu (1983), The Piano (1993), Whale Rider (2002), River Queen (2005), Boy (2010), Hunt for the Wilderpeople (2016) and Muru (2022). The Maori Merchant of Venice (2002) was notable as a complete Māori language translation and performance of Shakespeare's The Merchant of Venice.

Prominent Māori actors include Temuera Morrison, Cliff Curtis, Jemaine Clement, Lawrence Makoare, Miriama Smith, Manu Bennett, Keisha Castle-Hughes, James Rolleston, Rena Owen, Shavaughn Ruakere and Julian Dennison. In most cases their roles in Hollywood productions have them portraying ethnic groups other than Māori.

In the 2010s Māori actor-director Taika Waititi rose to global fame directing the Marvel Cinematic Universe film Thor: Ragnarok (2017), and the Academy Award-winning Jojo Rabbit (2019), in which he played Adolf Hitler in a supporting role. Waititi's previous films Boy and Hunt for the Wilderpeople, both feature young Māori protagonists.

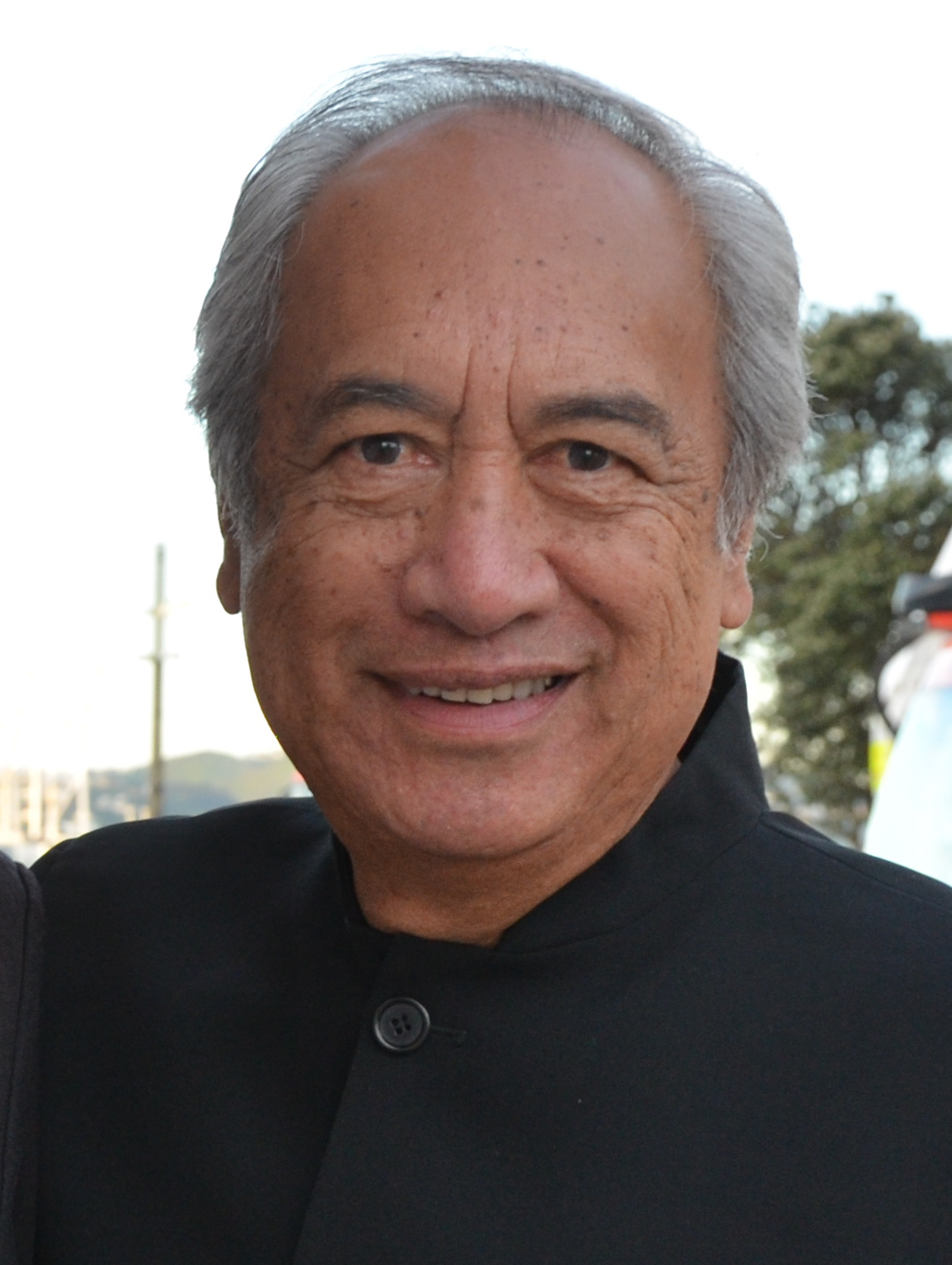
Witi Ihimaera

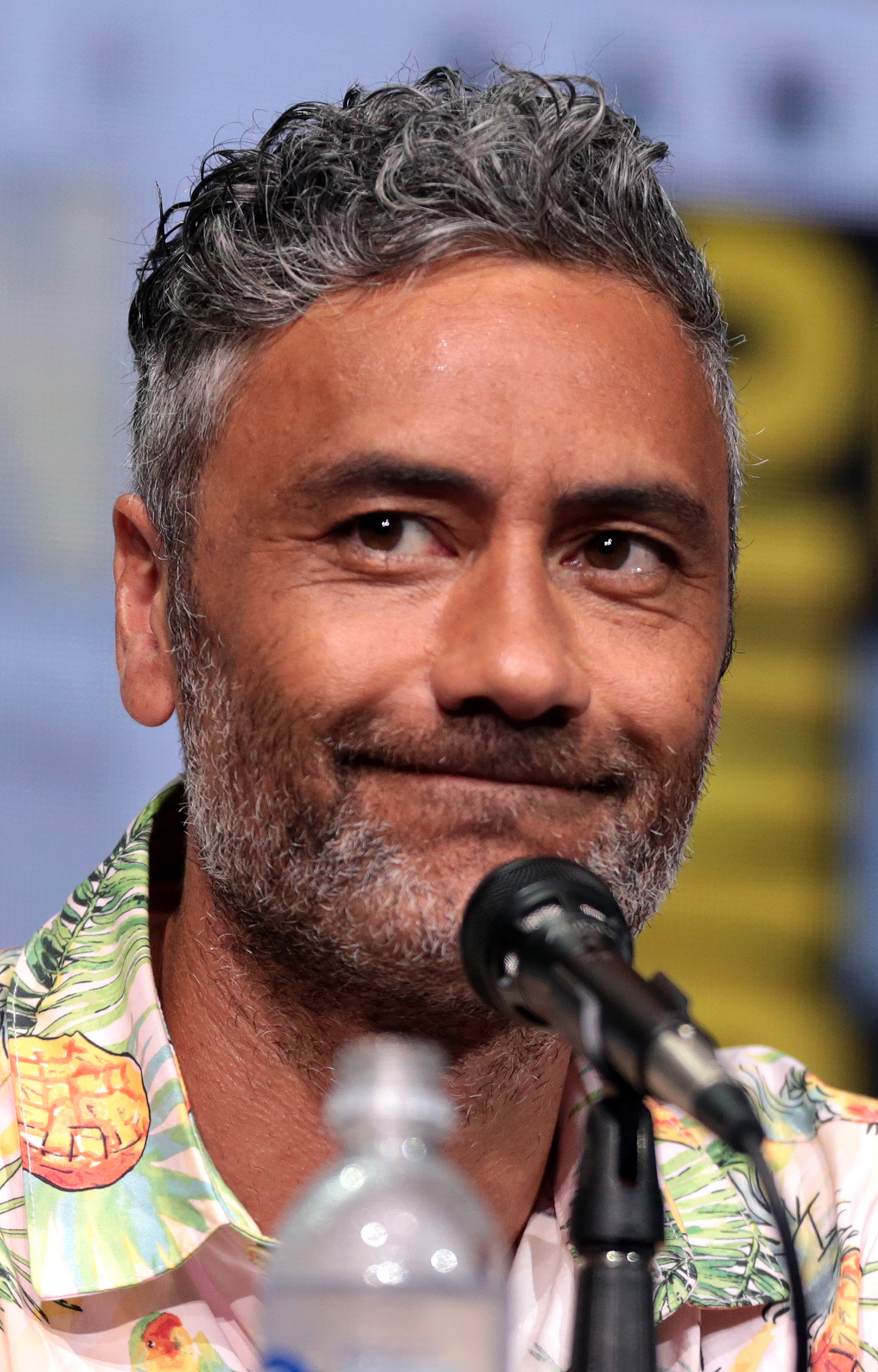
Taika Waititi

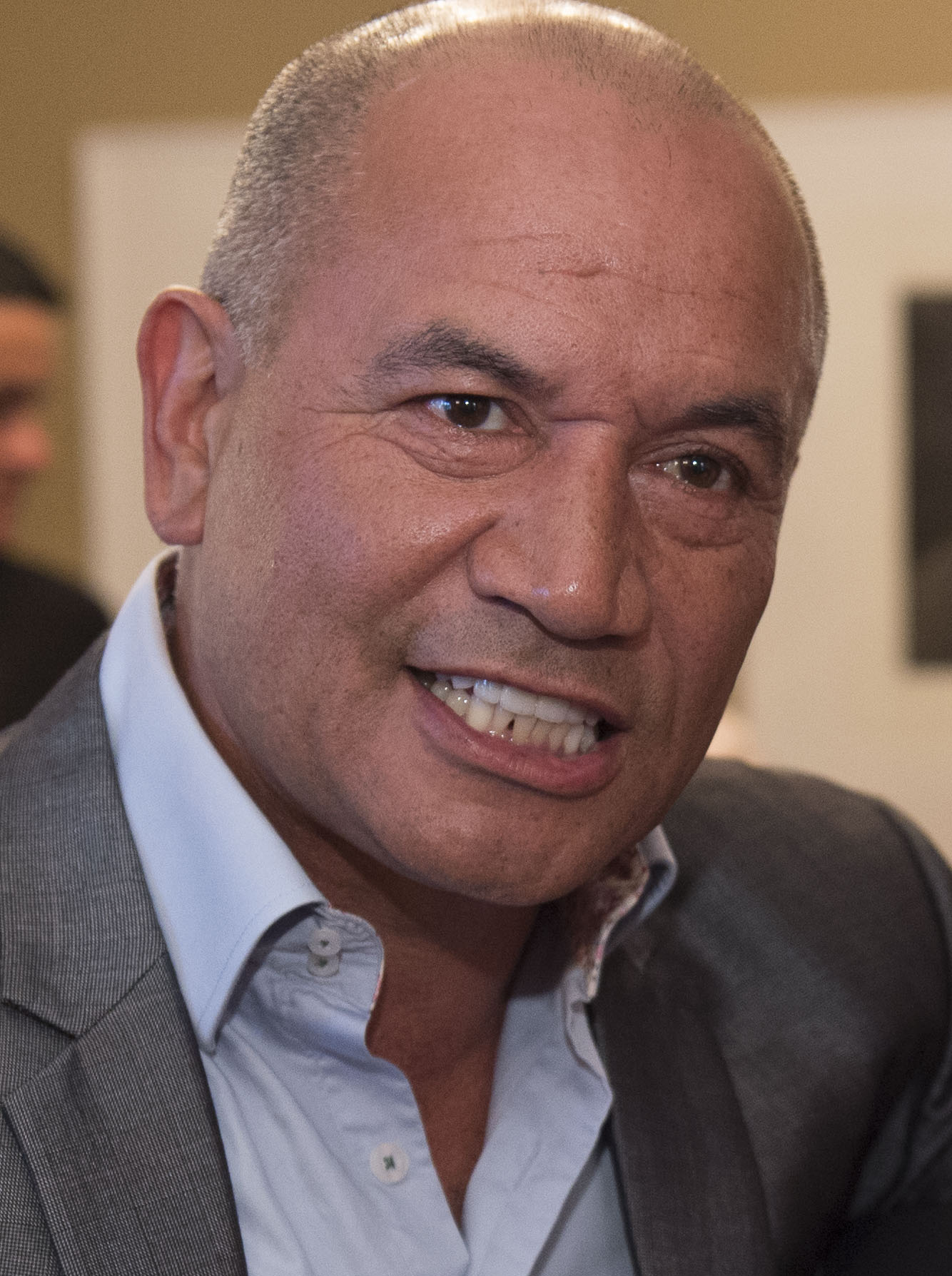
Temuera Morrison

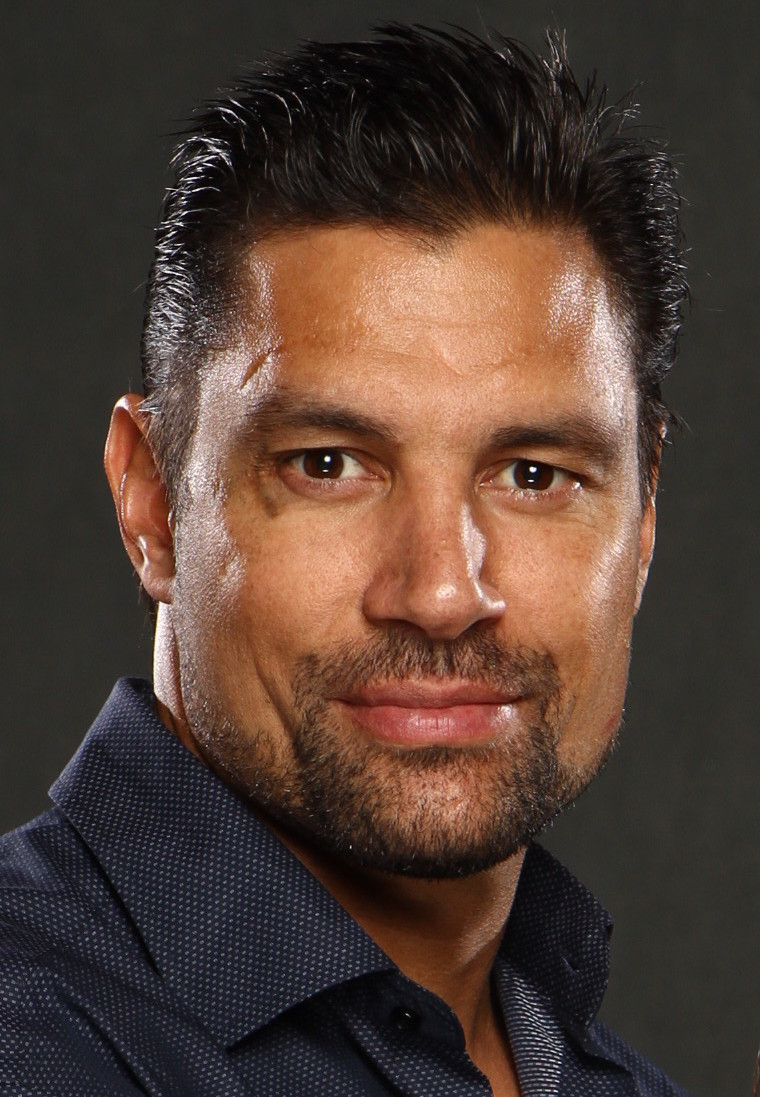
Manu Bennett

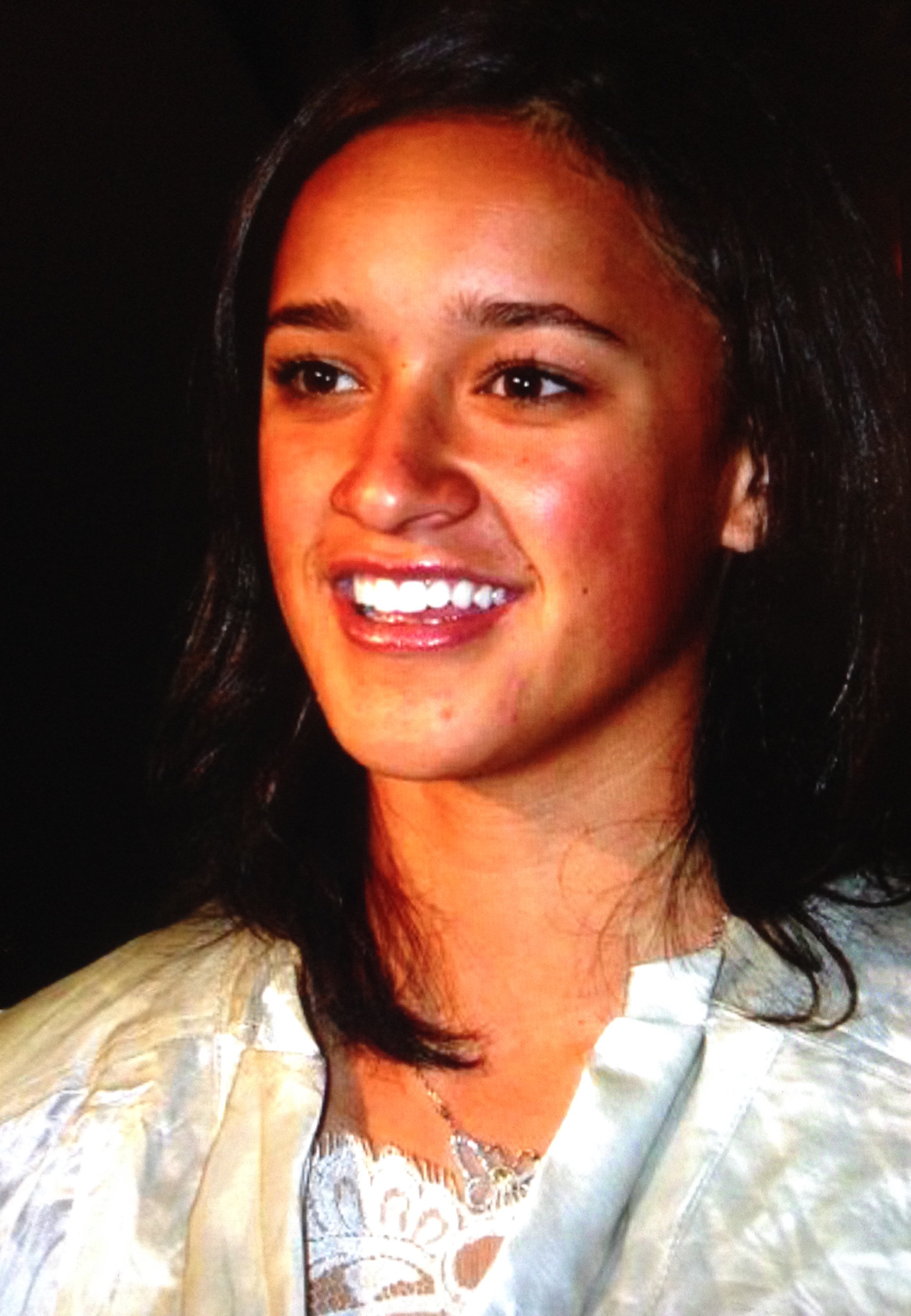
Keisha Castle-Hughes

=== Sport ===
Māori participate fully in New Zealand's sporting culture, and are well-represented in rugby union, rugby league and netball teams at all levels. Individual Māori players are members of national sports teams, and there are dedicated Māori rugby union, rugby league and cricket teams that play in international competitions.

At the 2016 Summer Olympics in Rio de Janeiro, 41 of the 199 competitors (20.5 per cent) were of Māori descent in the New Zealand delegation, with the rugby sevens squads alone having 17 Māori competitors (out of 24). There were also three competitors of Māori descent in the Australian delegation.

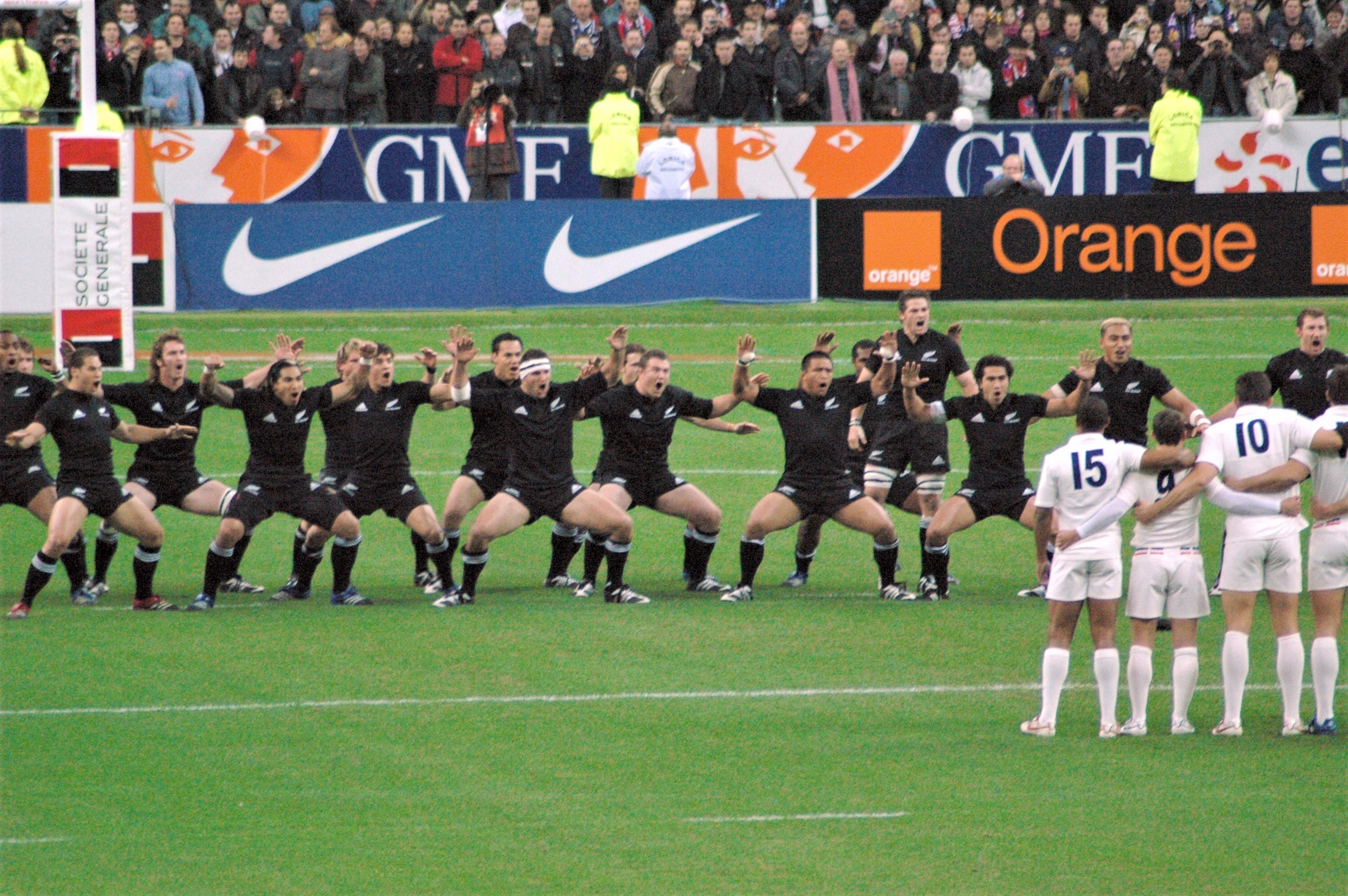
A haka performed by the national rugby union team before a game

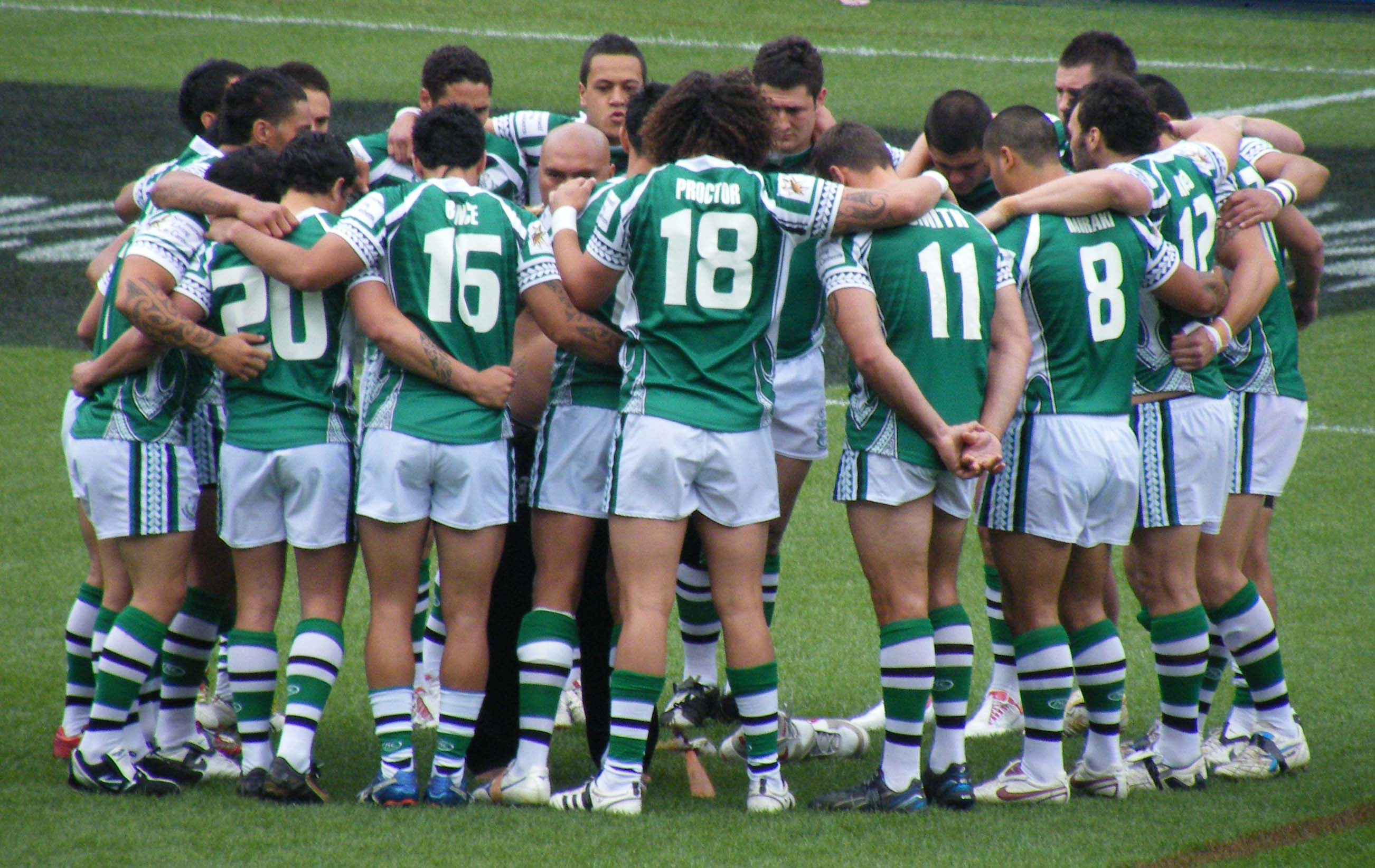
New Zealand Māori rugby league team vs Aboriginal Dreamtime match at 2008 Rugby League world cup

The New Zealand national rugby union team and many other New Zealand sports people perform a haka, a traditional Māori challenge, before events.

Kī-o-rahi and Tapawai are two ball sports of Māori origin. Kī-o-rahi received an unexpected boost when McDonald's chose it to represent New Zealand. Waka ama (outrigger canoeing) has also experienced a resurgence of interest in New Zealand since the 1980s.

== Language ==
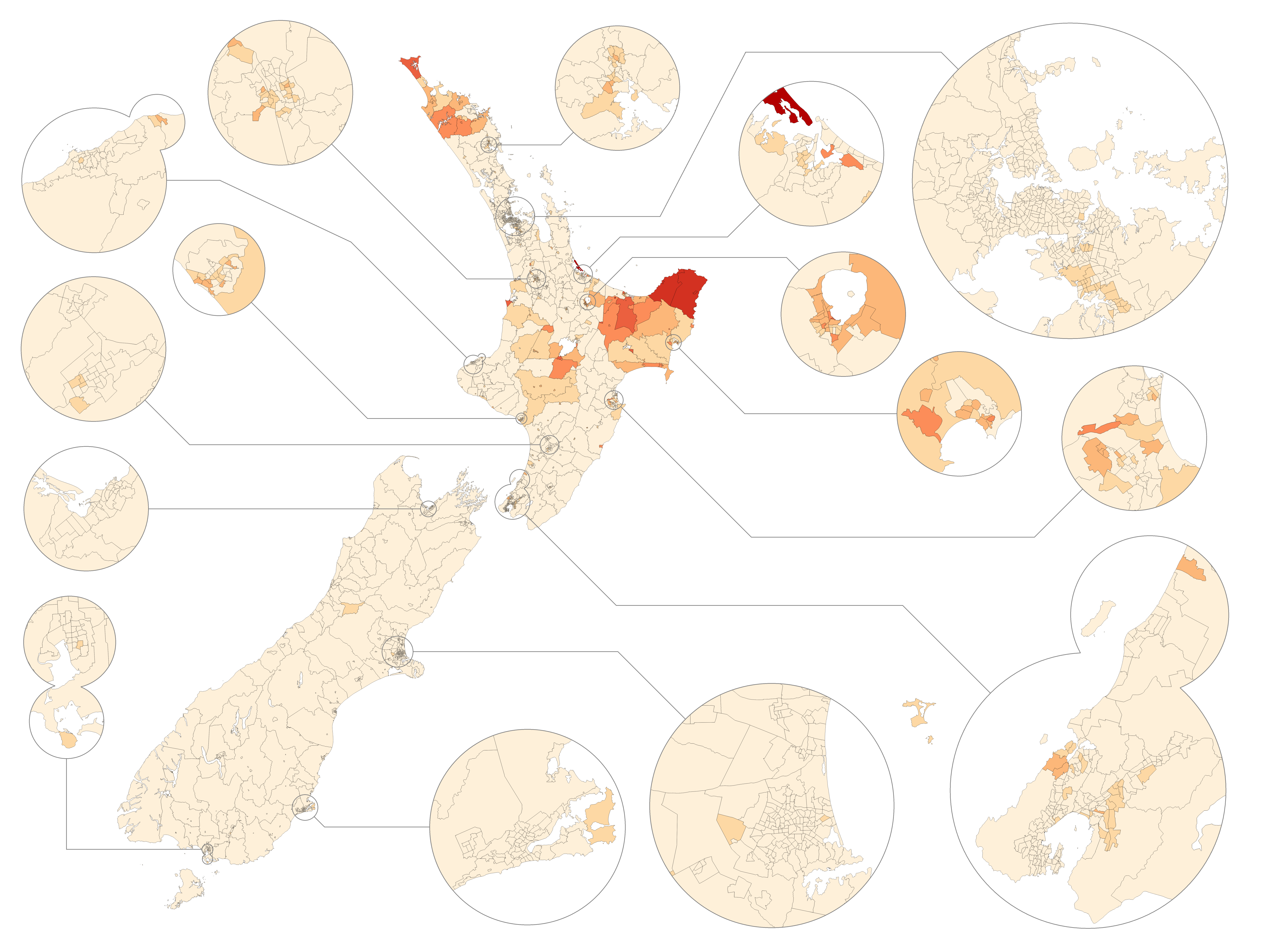
Speakers of Māori according to the 2013 census Less than 5% More than 5% More than 10% More than 20% More than 30% More than 40% More than 50%

The Māori language, also known as te reo Māori (pronounced [ˈmaːoɾi, te ˈɾeo ˈmaːoɾi]) or simply te reo ("the language"), has the status of an official language. Linguists classify it within the Eastern Polynesian languages as being closely related to Cook Islands Māori, Tuamotuan and Tahitian. Before European contact Māori did not have a written language and "important information such as whakapapa was memorised and passed down verbally through the generations". Māori were familiar with the concept of maps and when interacting with missionaries in 1815 could draw accurate maps of their rohe (iwi boundaries), onto paper, that were the equal of European maps. Missionaries surmised that Māori had traditionally drawn maps on sand or other natural materials.

From about 1890, Māori members of Parliament realised the importance of English literacy to Māori and insisted that all Māori children be taught in English. Missionaries, who still ran many Māori schools, had been teaching exclusively in Māori but the Māori MPs insisted this should stop. However attendance at school for many Māori was intermittent. In many areas of New Zealand, Māori lost its role as a living community language used by significant numbers of people in the post-war years. In tandem with calls for sovereignty and for the righting of social injustices from the 1970s onwards, New Zealand schools now teach Māori culture and language as an option, and pre-school kohanga reo ("language-nests") have started, which teach tamariki (young children) exclusively in Māori. These now extend right through secondary schools (kura tuarua). Most preschool centres teach basics such as colours, numerals and greetings in Māori songs and chants.

Māori Television, a government-funded channel committed to broadcasting primarily in te reo Māori, began in March 2004. The 1996 census reported 160,000 Māori speakers. At the time of the 2013 census 125,352 Māori (21.3 per cent) reported a conversational level of proficiency.

== Social organisation ==
=== Historical development ===
Polynesian settlers in New Zealand developed a distinct society over several hundred years. Social groups were tribal, with no unified society or single Māori identity until after the arrival of Europeans. Nevertheless, common elements could be found in all Māori groups in pre-European New Zealand, including a shared Polynesian heritage, a common basic language, familial associations, traditions of warfare, and similar mythologies and religious beliefs.

Most Māori lived in villages, which were inhabited by several whānau (extended families) who collectively formed a hapū (clan or subtribe). Members of a hapū cooperated with food production, gathering resources, raising families and defence. Māori society across New Zealand was broadly stratified into three classes of people: rangatira, chiefs and ruling families; tūtūā, commoners; and mōkai, slaves. Tohunga also held special standing in their communities as specialists of revered arts, skills and esoteric knowledge.

Shared ancestry, intermarriage and trade strengthened relationships between different groups. Many hapū with mutually recognised shared ancestry formed iwi, or tribes, which were the largest social unit in Māori society. Hapū and iwi often united for expeditions to gather food and resources, or in times of conflict. In contrast, warfare developed as an integral part of traditional life, as different groups competed for food and resources, settled personal disputes, and sought to increase their prestige and authority.

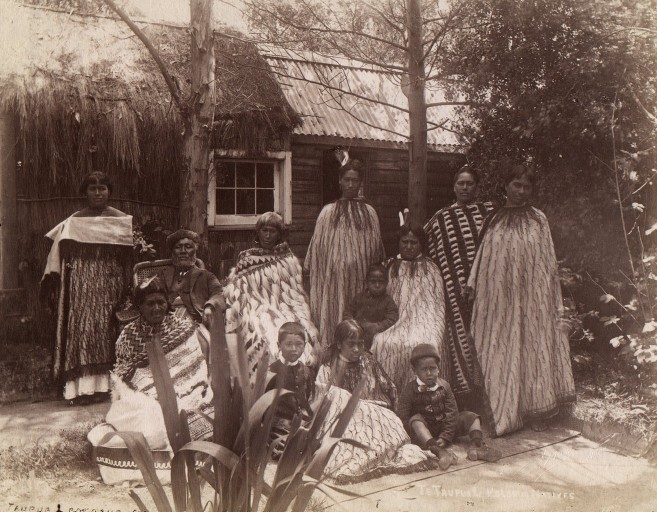
Māori whānau from Rotorua in the 1880s

Early European settlers introduced tools, weapons, clothing and foods to Māori across New Zealand, in exchange for resources, land and labour. Māori began selectively adopting elements of Western society during the 19th century, including European clothing and food, and later Western education, religion and architecture. However, as the 19th century wore on, relations between European colonial settlers and different Māori groups became increasingly strained. Tensions led to widespread conflict in the 1860s, and the confiscation of millions of acres of Māori land. Significant amounts of land were also purchased by the colonial government and later through the Native Land Court.

==== 20th century to present ====
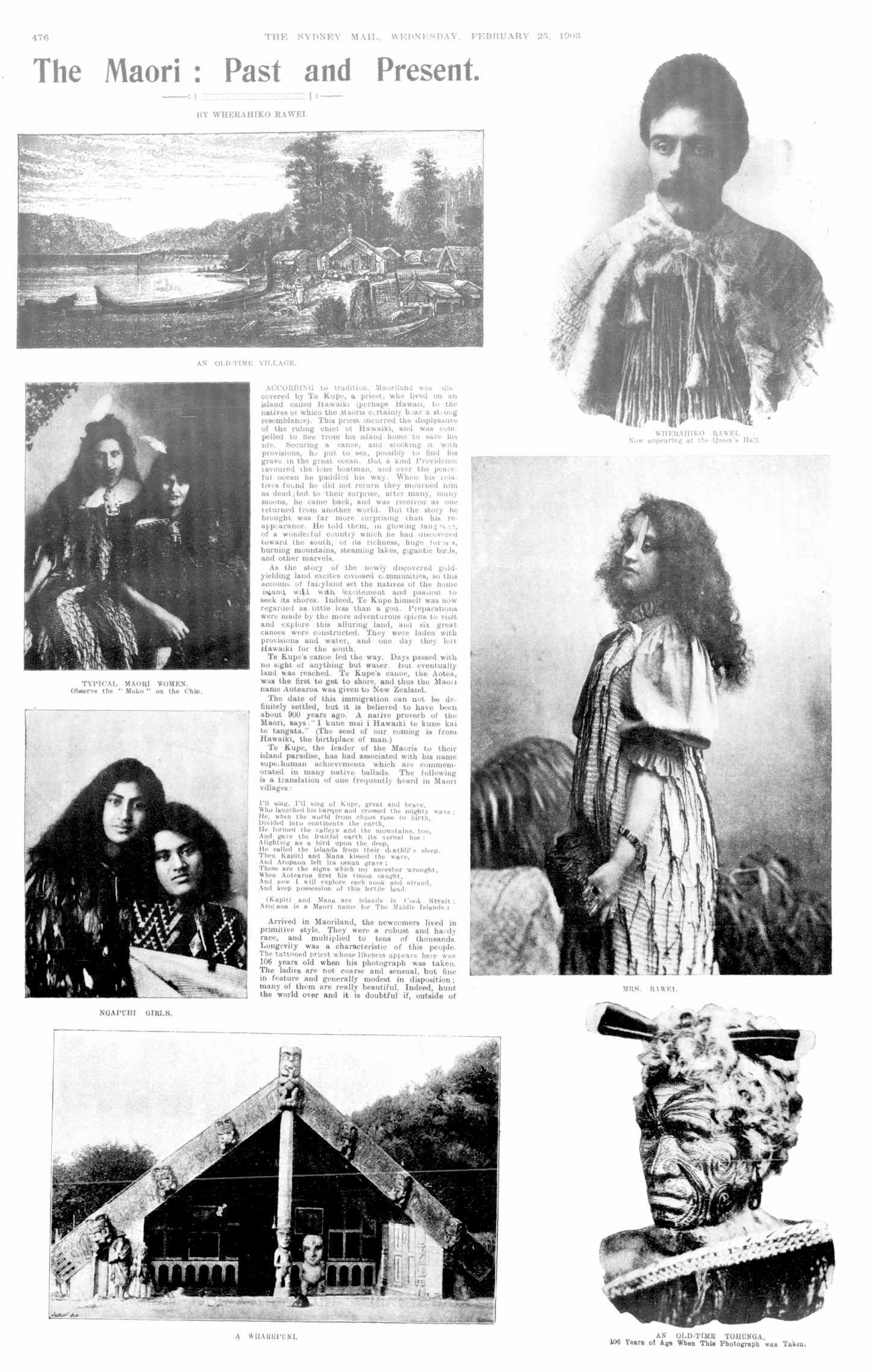
"The Māori: Past and Present", article from The Sydney Mail, 1903

By the start of the 20th century, a greater awareness had emerged of a unified Māori identity, particularly in comparison to Pākehā, who now overwhelmingly outnumbered the Māori as a whole. Māori and Pākehā societies remained largely separate—socially, culturally, economically and geographically—for much of the 19th and early 20th centuries. The key reason for this was that Māori remained almost exclusively a rural population, whereas increasingly the European population was urban especially after 1900. Nevertheless, Māori groups continued to engage with the government and in legal processes to increase their standing in (and ultimately further their incorporation into) wider New Zealand society. The main point of contact with the government were the four Māori Members of Parliament.

Many Māori migrated to larger rural towns and cities during the Depression and post-WWII periods in search of employment, leaving rural communities depleted and disconnecting many urban Māori from their traditional social controls and tribal homelands. Yet while standards of living improved among Māori, they continued to lag behind Pākehā in areas such as health, income, skilled employment and access to higher levels of education. Māori leaders and government policymakers alike struggled to deal with social issues stemming from increased urban migration, including a shortage of housing and jobs, and a rise in urban crime, poverty and health problems.

In regards to housing, a 1961 census revealed significant differences in the living conditions of Māori and Europeans. That year, out of all the (unshared) non-Māori private dwellings in New Zealand, 96.8 per cent had a bath or shower, 94.1 per cent a hot water service, 88.7 per cent a flush toilet, 81.6 per cent a refrigerator, and 78.6 per cent an electric washing machine. By contrast, for all (unshared) Māori private dwellings that same year, 76.8 per cent had a bath or shower, 68.9 per cent a hot water service, 55.8 per cent a refrigerator, 54.1 per cent a flush toilet, and 47 per cent an electric washing machine.

While the arrival of Europeans had a profound impact on the Māori way of life, many aspects of traditional society have survived into the 21st century. Māori participate fully in all spheres of New Zealand culture and society, leading largely Western lifestyles while also maintaining their own cultural and social customs. The traditional social strata of rangatira, tūtūā and mōkai have all but disappeared from Māori society, while the roles of tohunga and kaumātua are still present. Traditional kinship ties are also actively maintained, and the whānau in particular remains an integral part of Māori life.

=== Marae, hapū and iwi ===
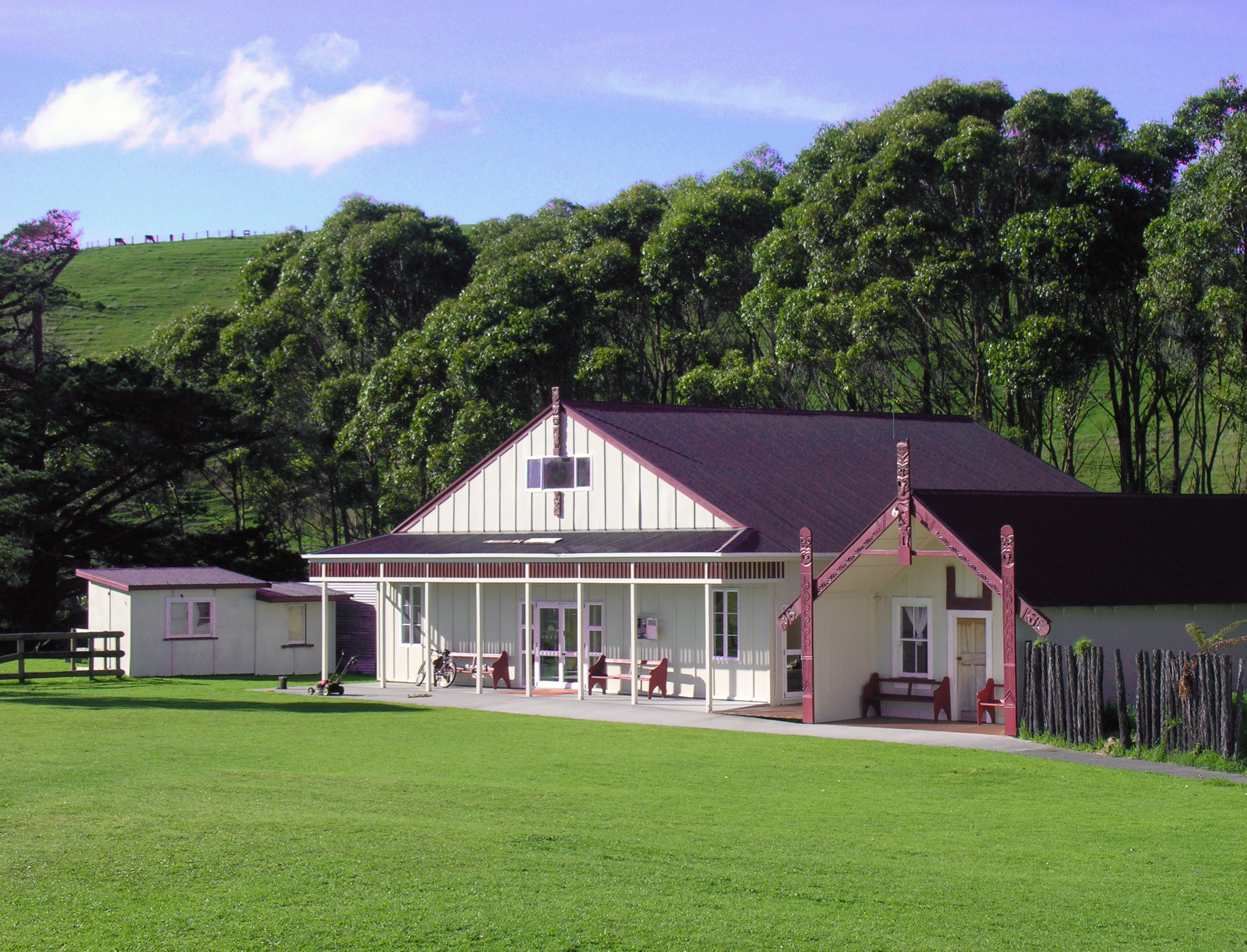
Whenuakura Marae in Taranaki

Māori society at a local level is particularly visible at the marae. Formerly the central meeting spaces in traditional villages, marae today usually comprise a group of buildings around an open space, that frequently host events such as weddings, funerals, church services and other large gatherings, with traditional protocol and etiquette usually observed. They also serve as the base of one or sometimes several hapū.

Most Māori affiliate with one or more iwi (and hapū), based on genealogical descent (whakapapa). Iwi vary in size, from a few hundred members to over 100,000 in the case of Ngāpuhi. Many people do not live in their traditional tribal regions as a result of urban migration (see Urban Māori). Iwi are usually governed by rūnanga (tribal councils or assemblies) which represent the iwi in consultations and negotiations with the New Zealand government.

=== Race relations ===
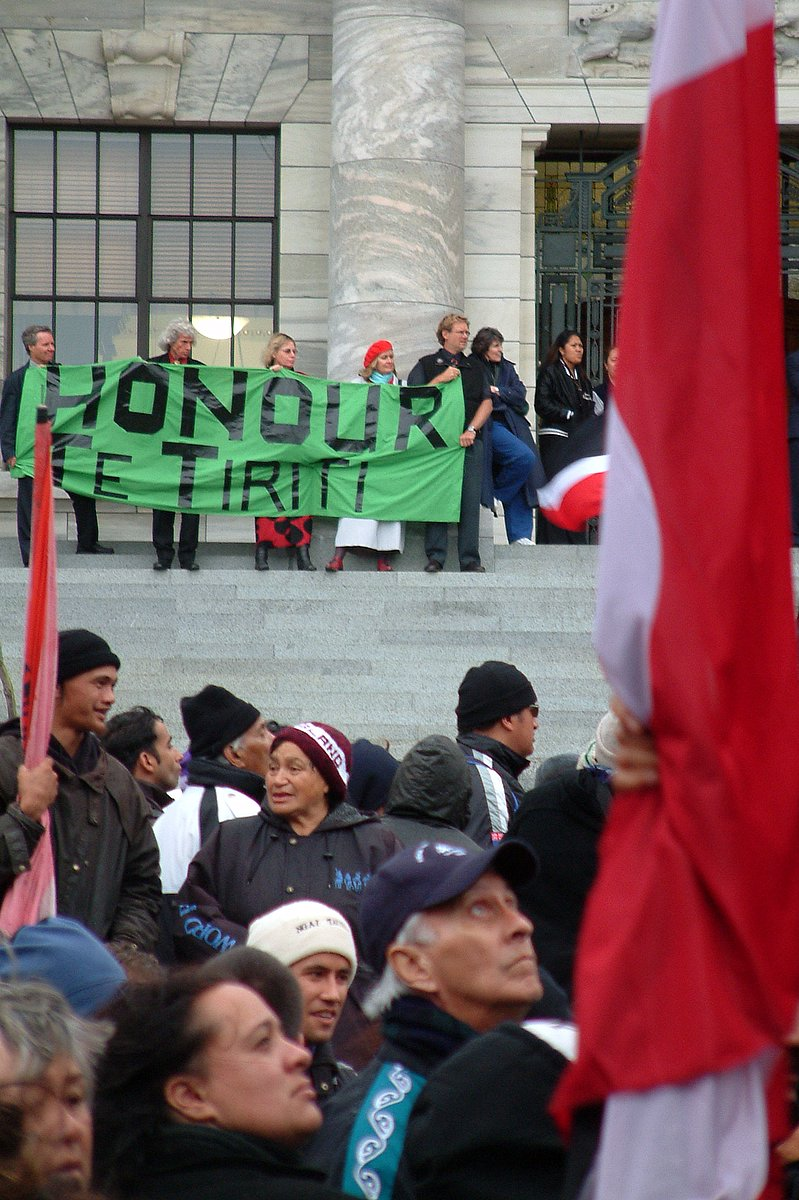
Protest hīkoi during the foreshore and seabed controversy in 2004

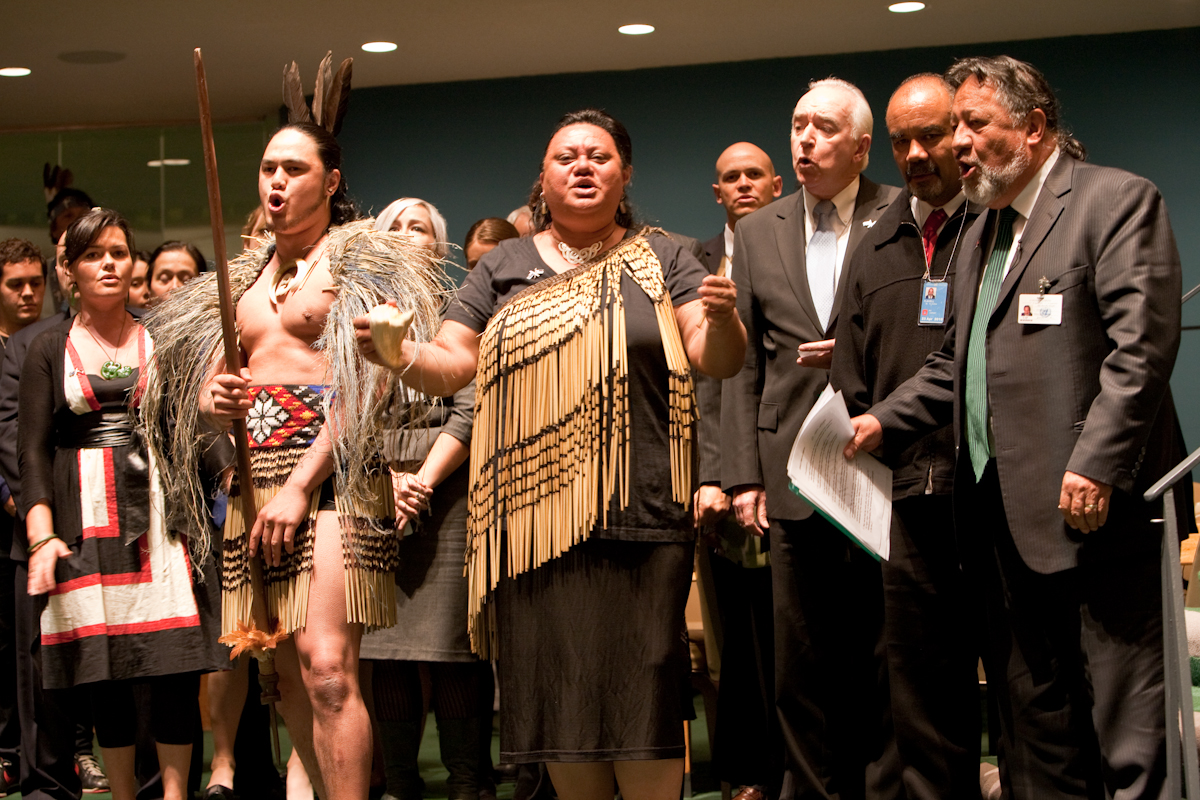
New Zealand endorsed the United Nations Declaration on the Rights of Indigenous Peoples in April 2010.

Māori issues are a prominent feature of race relations in New Zealand. Historically, many Pākehā viewed race relations in their country as being the "best in the world", a view that prevailed until Māori urban migration in the mid-20th century brought cultural and socioeconomic differences to wider attention.

Māori protest movements grew significantly in the 1960s and 1970s seeking redress for past grievances, particularly in regard to land rights. Successive governments have responded by enacting affirmative action programmes, funding cultural rejuvenation initiatives and negotiating tribal settlements for past breaches of the Treaty of Waitangi. Further efforts have focused on reducing socioeconomic disparity.

A 2007 Department of Corrections report found that Māori are disproportionately represented in the criminal justice system: "a number of studies have shown evidence of greater likelihood, associated only with ethnicity, for Māori offenders to have police contact, be charged, lack legal representation, not be granted bail, plead guilty, be convicted, be sentenced to non-monetary penalties, and be denied release to Home Detention". Conversely, critics denounce the scale of assistance given to Māori as amounting to preferential treatment for a select group of people based on race. Both sentiments were highlighted during the foreshore and seabed controversy in 2004, in which the New Zealand government claimed sole ownership of the New Zealand foreshore and seabed, over the objections of Māori groups who were seeking customary title.

== Socioeconomic issues ==
Māori on average have fewer assets than the rest of the population, and run greater risks of many negative economic and social outcomes. Over 50 per cent of Māori live in areas in the three highest deprivation deciles, compared with 24 per cent of the rest of the population.

Although Māori make up 16.5 per cent of the population, they make up 53.0 per cent of the prison population. Māori have higher unemployment rates than other ethnic groups in New Zealand, which is believed to partially account for their over-representation in the criminal justice system; many young Māori, finding themselves unemployed, are picked up for alcohol-related behaviours or small crimes such as vandalism. Underemployment is in turn attributed to persistent institutional racism in New Zealand.

"Only 47 per cent of Māori school-leavers finish school with qualifications higher than NCEA Level One; compared to 74 per cent European; 87 per cent Asian." Although New Zealand rates very well globally in the PISA rankings that compare national performance in reading, science and maths, "once you disaggregate the PISA scores, Pakeha students are second in the world and Māori are 34th." At the 2018 New Zealand census, 25.3% of Māori aged 15 and over had no formal qualifications, compared to 17.1% for non-Māori New Zealanders, and only 12.5% of Māori have a bachelor's degree or higher, compared to 26.8% of non-Māori.

A 2008 study by the New Zealand Family Violence Clearinghouse showed that Māori women and children are more likely to experience domestic violence than any other ethnic group.

=== Health ===
In 2017–2019, life expectancy for Māori in New Zealand was 73.4 years for men and 77.1 years for women, compared to 80.9 years for non-Māori men and 84.4 years for non-Māori women, a difference of 7.5 and 7.3 years respectively. However, Māori have a wide range of life expectancies across regions: Māori living in Marlborough have the highest life expectancy at 79.9 years for men and 83.4 years for women, while Māori living in the Gisborne District have the lowest life expectancy at 71.2 years for men and 75.2 years for women.

Māori suffer more health problems, including higher levels of alcohol and drug abuse, smoking and obesity. Less frequent use of healthcare services mean that late diagnosis and treatment intervention lead to higher levels of morbidity and mortality in many manageable conditions. Compared with non-Māori, Māori people experience higher rates of heart disease, strokes, most cancers, respiratory diseases, rheumatic fever, suicide and self-harm, and infant deaths.

In April 2021, the government announced the creation of the first dedicated Māori Health Authority, Te Aka Whai Ora, "with the power to directly commission health services for Māori and to partner with Health NZ in other aspects of the health system". This was disestablished in February 2024 by the National-led government.

== Commerce ==
Wider commercial exposure has increased public awareness of the Māori culture, but has also resulted in several legal disputes. Between 1998 and 2006, Ngāti Toa attempted to trademark the haka "Ka Mate" to prevent its use by commercial organisations without their permission. In 2001, Danish toymaker Lego faced legal action by several Māori tribal groups opposed to them trademarking Māori words used in the Bionicle product range.

== Political representation ==
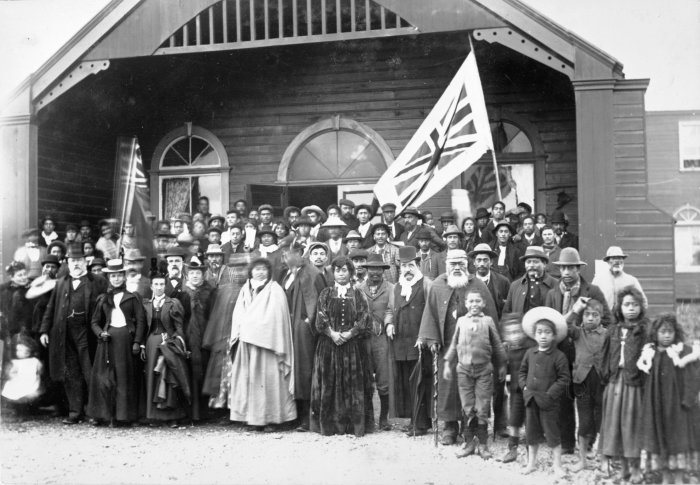
The opening of the Māori Parliament at Pāpāwai, Greytown in 1897, with Richard Seddon in attendance

The national Māori flag, also known as the Tino rangatiratanga (absolute sovereignty) flag. Designed in 1989, it is widely used by Māori groups.

Māori have been represented to the Crown in New Zealand politics since the Declaration of the Independence of New Zealand, before the Treaty of Waitangi was signed in 1840. Being a traditionally tribal people, no one organisation ostensibly speaks for all Māori nationwide. The Māori King Movement (Kīngitanga) originated in the 1860s as an attempt by several iwi to unify under one leader; in modern times, it serves a largely ceremonial role. Another attempt at political unity was the Kotahitanga Movement, which established a separate Māori Parliament that held annual sessions from 1892 until its last sitting in 1902.

Māori have had reserved seats in the New Zealand Parliament since 1868. Māori received universal suffrage with other New Zealand citizens in 1893. Currently, Māori reserved electorates account for seven of the 120 seats in New Zealand's unicameral parliament, and consideration of and consultation with Māori have become routine requirements for councils and government organisations. The contesting of these seats was the first opportunity for many Māori to participate in New Zealand elections, although the elected Māori representatives initially struggled to assert significant influence. Sir Āpirana Ngata has often been described as the foremost Māori politician to have served in Parliament in the mid-20th century.

Debate occurs frequently as to the relevance and legitimacy of the separate electoral roll and the reserved seats. The National Party announced in 2008 it would abolish the seats when all historic Treaty settlements have been resolved, which it aimed to complete by 2014. However, after the election National reached an agreement with the Māori Party not to abolish the seats until Māori give their approval.

Several Māori political parties have formed over the years to improve the position of Māori in New Zealand society. The present Māori Party, formed in 2004, secured 1.32 per cent of the party vote at the 2014 general election and held two seats in the 51st New Zealand Parliament, with two MPs serving as Ministers outside Cabinet. The party did not achieve any representatives in the 52nd New Zealand Parliament, but regained two seats in the 53rd.

Following the 2020 reelection of the New Zealand Labour Party to government, Labour Minister Nanaia Mahuta became the first female Māori Foreign Minister of New Zealand; she replaced Winston Peters, also Māori, in the role. In 2016 she became the first Member of Parliament to have moko kauae (the traditional Māori female facial tattoo). In the 2020 election more MPs with moko kauae entered Parliament, including Māori Party co-leader Debbie Ngarewa-Packer and Green Party MP Elizabeth Kerekere.

The 54th Parliament after the 2023 New Zealand general election has seen a historically high number of Māori MPs at 33. Māori are at 27% of the parliament while in the general population they are 17%.

== See also ==
- List of planetary features with Māori names
- Category:New Zealand Māori people
- List of Māori organisations

== Bibliography ==
- Hill, Richard S (2009). "Maori and State Policy". In Byrnes, Giselle (ed.). The New Oxford History of New Zealand. Oxford University Press. ISBN 978-0-19-558471-4.
- Howe, K. R. (2003). The quest for origins: who first discovered and settled the Pacific islands?. University of Hawaii Press. ISBN 978-0-14-301857-5.
- Howe, Kerry (2006). "Ideas of Māori Origins". Māori Peoples of New Zealand: Ngā Iwi o Aotearoa. Te Ara – The Encyclopedia of New Zealand. Auckland: David Bateman.
- Irwin, Geoffrey (2006). "Pacific Migrations". Māori Peoples of New Zealand: Ngā Iwi o Aotearoa. Te Ara – The Encyclopedia of New Zealand. Auckland: David Bateman.
- King, Michael (1996). Maori: A Photographic and Social History (2nd ed.). Auckland: Reed Publishing. ISBN 978-0-7900-0500-3.
- King, Michael (2003). The Penguin History of New Zealand. Penguin. ISBN 978-0-14-301867-4.
- Lashley, Marilyn E. (2006). "Remedying Racial and Ethnic Inequality in New Zealand: Reparative and Distributive Policies of Social Justice". In Myers, Samuel L.; Corrie, Bruce P. (eds.). Racial and ethnic economic inequality: an international perspective. Vol. 1996. New York: Peter Lang. ISBN 978-0-8204-5656-0.
- McIntosh, Tracey (2005). "Maori Identities: Fixed, Fluid, Forced". In Liu, James H.; McCreanor, Tim; McIntosh, Tracey; Teaiwa, Teresia (eds.). New Zealand Identities: Departures and Destinations. Wellington: Victoria University Press.
- Mead, Hirini Moko (2003). Tikanga Māori: living by Māori values. Wellington: Huia Publishers. ISBN 978-1-877283-88-8.
- Orange, Claudia (1989). The Story of a Treaty. Wellington: Allen & Unwin. ISBN 978-0-04-641053-7.
- Sorrenson, Keith (1997). "Modern Māori: The Young Maori Party to Mana Motuhake". In Sinclair, Keith (ed.). The Oxford Illustrated History of New Zealand (2nd ed.). Oxford University Press. ISBN 978-0-19-558381-6.
