= List of Māori organisations =

This is a list of New Zealand Māori organisations.

== A ==
- Ake 1179
- Atiawa Toa FM
- Awa FM

== B ==
- Bridge FM 91.7

== K ==
- Kia Ora FM

== M ==
- Maniapoto FM
- Moana Radio

== N ==
- National Iwi Chairs Forum
- Nga Iwi FM
- Ngā Taonga o Ngaitakoto Trust
- Ngāti Hine FM

== R ==
- Radio Kahungunu
- Radio Ngāti Porou
- Radio Tainui
- Radio Waatea
- Raukawa FM

== S ==
- Sun FM

== T ==
- Tahu FM
- Tautoko FM
- Te Arawa FM
- Te Hiku Media
- Te Korimako O Taranaki
- Te Reo Irirangi o Te Hiku o Te Ika
- Te Rūnanga a Iwi o Ngāpuhi
- Te Rūnanga o Ngāi Takoto
- Te Upoko O Te Ika
- The Heat 991 FM
- Tumeke FM
- Turanga FM
- Tuwharetoa FM
