= Motunau / Plate Island =

Island in New Zealand

- Location of Motunau / Plate Island in New Zealand
- Etymology: From Māori: Motu (island) and nau (Lepidium oleraceum). Plate Island has unclear origins.

Geography
- Location: Bay of Plenty
- Coordinates: 37.662°S 176.560°E
- Area: 0.038 km^{2} (0.015 sq mi)
- Length: 390 m (1280 ft)
- Width: 200 m (700 ft)

Administration
- New Zealand
- Region: Bay of Plenty

Motunau / Plate Island is a small island in the Bay of Plenty, roughly 12 kilometres (7.5 mi) off New Zealand's North Island at Okurei Point and a similar distance east-south-east from the much larger Mōtītī Island. The island is split into northern and southern portions by a small channel as narrow as 2 metres (6 ft 7 in) across, with several small sea stacks surrounding the two main parts of the island. Like many of the other islands in the Bay of Plenty, Motunau is volcanic in origin and lacks any permanent fresh water source, and as a result has not seen permanent settlement by humans.

The lack of human interaction with the island or introduced predators has led to Motunau becoming home to a range of native animal species, including a population of tuatara, as well as a breeding colony of kekeno (New Zealand fur seals) and several seabirds. As a result of this, the island was legally protected as a wildlife sanctuary in 1969, and in 2021 the surrounding ocean was designated a Marine Protection Area.

== History ==
Motunau has held significance for local Māori as a navigational marker and mahinga kai (food gathering site) since before Pākehā settlement. The island was used to collect tītī by members of Ngāti Whakahemo, an iwi local to the area, while the waters around it were a rich source of seafood such as kina. The island's name comes from the Māori words motu, meaning "island", and nau, referring to Lepidium oleraceum, a herb which was formerly common around the island and which was used by Captain Cook's crew to combat scurvy.

Māori interaction with the island was limited to temporary visits, due to the lack of a permanent freshwater source on the island. Despite this, the island has maintained its connection with local Māori throughout the history of Pākehā settlement in New Zealand, forming part of the rohe of Ngāti Whakahemo and continuing to be owned by that iwi to this day. This ownership has persisted despite the island's designation as a wildlife sanctuary in 1969, which imposed restrictions on who is able to land on the island. Representatives of Ngāti Whakahemo act as kaitiaki (guardians) for the island in partnership with the Department of Conservation, and although access to the island is controlled by DOC, members of the wider iwi are able to maintain a degree of customary access to the island. Further protections were added to the surrounding ocean in 2021, with the establishment of a Marine Protection Area around Motunau / Plate Island, Motuhaku Island, and Astrolabe Reef.

== Geography ==
Motunau / Plate Island is situated roughly 12 kilometres (7.5 mi) to the northeast of Okurei Point, on New Zealand's North Island. As with other islands in the Bay of Plenty (such as the active Whakaari / White Island, Mayor Island / Tūhua, or the nearby Mōtītī Island), Motunau / Plate Island is volcanic in origin, sitting at the northern end of the Taupō Volcanic Zone. The island is the tip of a larger mount which extends roughly 60 metres (200 ft) above the seafloor of the Bay, and is one of three similar rises in the immediate area (the other two of which are fully submerged). A narrow channel splits the island into two portions: a northern island of roughly 0.8 hectares (2.0 acres) and a larger southern island of 2.8 hectares (6.9 acres). Several sea stacks surround the island, while on Motunau itself, cliffs and course breccia cover much of the island's coastline, limiting access points to small corners of each island. The centre of the island consists of a plateau formed by the surrounding ridges, reaching a height of approximately 30 metres (98 ft) above sea level.

== Ecology ==
As a result of its limited human interaction and distance from other landmasses, Motunau / Plate Island has not had any invasive species introduced to it. Due to this, the island has become home to a range of native birds and reptiles, as well as a 200-strong colony of kekeno. Three species of reptile have been recorded on the island: the Raukawa gecko, short-tailed skink, and a large population of tuatara. The tuatara population of the island has been shown to have a high level of genetic diversity compared to populations on other offshore islands (such as Little Brother Island), suggesting a historic population bottleneck on those islands.

Several birds, particularly seabirds, are also found on the island. A large breeding colony of up to 10,000 Grey-faced petrel is found on the southern portion of the island at densities of up to 1 burrow per square metre. White-faced storm petrels, tākapu, tarāpunga, pied shags, and tauhou are also common around the island, while evidence exists for populations of fluttering and flesh-footed shearwaters, kororā, and diving petrels, typically in the form of nesting sites. A wide range of other native and introduced species have also been reported on the island, though typically in low numbers without evidence of whether there is an established population.

Motunau / Plate Island's relative isolation also has an impact on the vegetation which can be found on the island, as it limits the ability for wind-dispersed seeds to reach the island. As a result, the island's foliage is composed mostly of plants dispersed by birds, particularly those able to withstand coastal conditions and sea spray. The inland forests of the island are made up of primarily karo (Pittosporum crassifolium), coastal mahoe (Melicytus novae-zelandiae) and taupata (Coprosma repens), as well as occasional pōhutukawa (Metrosideros excelsa), while areas closer to the coast are instead populated by smaller shrubs such as glasswort (Salicornia quinqueflora), New Zealand ice plant (Disphyma australe), and smaller shrub-like taupata. Despite the island's name, a survey in the late 1980s found no examples of nau (L. oleraceum) remaining on the island at that time.

The now-protected waters surrounding Motunau provide habitats for a range of fish species found across New Zealand, including trevally, kahawai, and blue maomao, as well as seafloor-dwelling species such as kina. The channel separating the two parts of the island is also notable for containing a range of usually deep-water cup sponges, hydroids and bryozoans at depths of less than 5 metres (16 ft) below sea level. This environment was threatened in 2011 by an oil spill caused by the sinking of the MV Rena on nearby Astrolabe Reef.
