= Ngāti Whakahemo =

Māori iwi (tribe) in Aotearoa (New Zealand)

- Iwi (tribe) in Māoridom
- Rohe (region): Bay of Plenty
- Waka (canoe): Tākitimu, Te Arawa, Mātaatua
- Population: 3000 (projected)

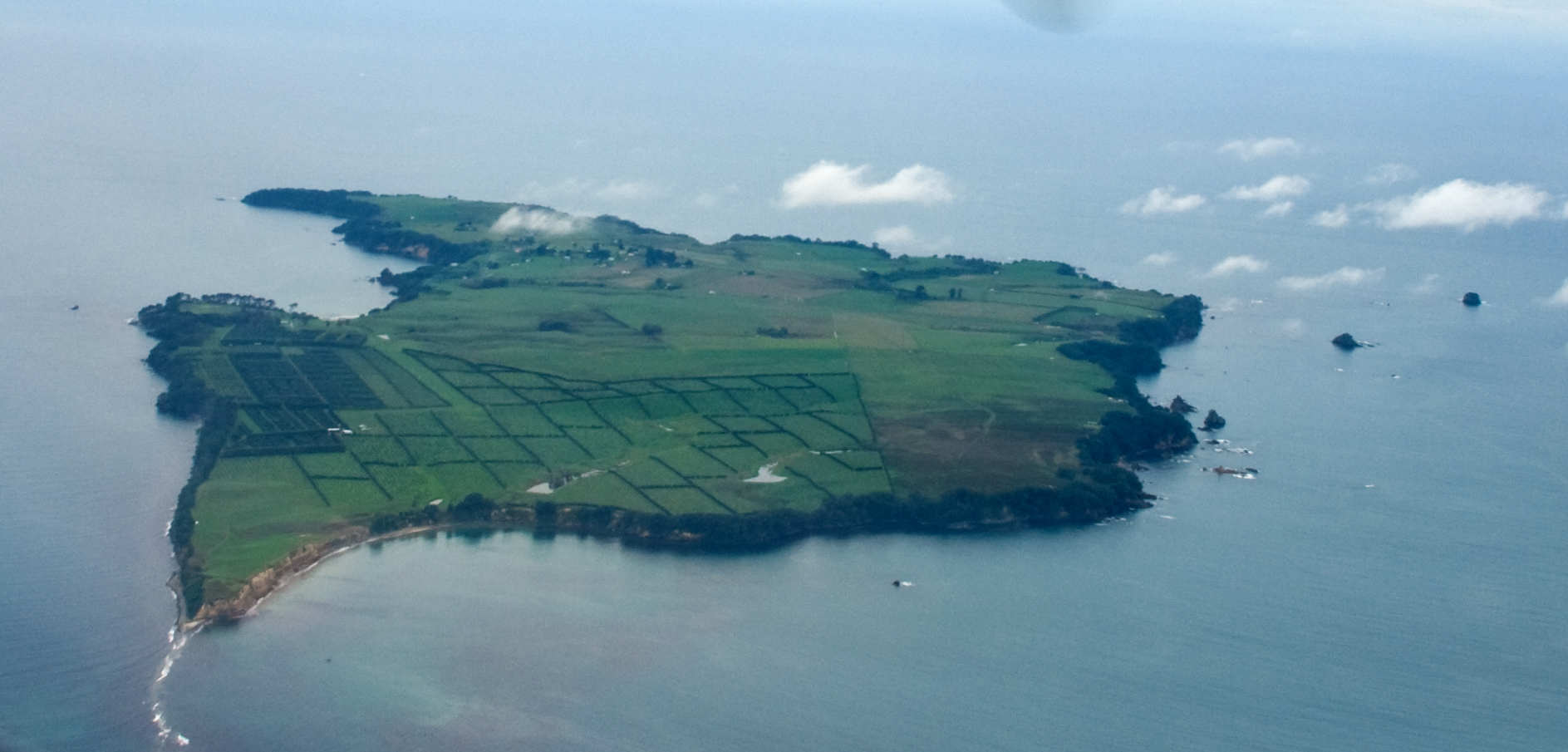
Mōtītī Island is part of the rohe (tribal area) of Ngāti Whakahemo

Ngāti Whakahemo is a Māori iwi of New Zealand. Its rohe (tribal area) covers the areas around Pongakawa and Pukehina, as well as Mōtītī Island, Motuhaku Island and Motunau / Plate Island, in the Bay of Plenty region. Since 1998, the iwi has been pursuing claims to Pongakawa and Pukehina before the Waitangi tribunal.

== History ==
The tribe traces its ancestry back to the ancestor Maruāhaira, who descended from the arrivals on the Tākitimu waka (migration canoe). Maruāhaira affiliated to Te Arawa and Mātaatua waka through marriages, and the iwi has maintained an historical association with Te Arawa. The people were originally settled at Tawhitirahi, near Opotiki, but were attacked by Ngāti Hā and fled, beginning a long period of migration for Rangihouhiri, known as Te Heke o Te Rangihouhiri. They first fled to the East Cape, where they were given refuge by Te Waho-o-te-rangi, who settled them on Te Whakaroa mountain on the Waimata River. Later, he decided to kill them all, but they found out about his plans and ambushed his attack force. Maruāhaira was one of the chiefs who led the people away to Hakuranui at Tōrere on the Bay of Plenty (northeast of their original home at Tawhitirahi). Maruāhaira's son-in-law, Te Arairehe of Waitaha, who lived at Pukehina, insulted Maruāhaira, so he and his son Maraika attacked Pukehina. They settled there and established Ngāti Whakahemo (literally 'the descendants of the one who departed').

=== Treaty claim ===
Ngāti Whakahemo decided to submit a claim for redress from the Crown to the Waitangi Tribunal in 1998, which was formally lodged in 2008 as WAI 1471 (Pukehina) and WAI 2536 (Pongakawa). The Crown responded that Ngāti Whakahemo was a hapu of Ngāti Pikiao and that its claims were therefore covered by the Te Arawa settlement, which was finalised by the Affiliate Te Arawa Iwi and Hapū Settlement Act 2008, but Ngāti Whakahemo challenged this on the grounds that it is descended from Maruahira not Pikiao. In 2013, the iwi had a disagreement with Landcorp over the sale of Wharere Farm, publicly-owned farmland it said had been confiscated by the Crown. Ngāti Whakahemo established the Ngāti Whakahemo Claims Committee to pursue the disagreement through the courts. In 2016, the Supreme Court of New Zealand ruled that the sale had been wrongful, but refused to reverse it. The Supreme Court also ruled that Ngāti Whakahemo's treaty claims, WAI 1471 (Pukehina) and WAI 2536 (Pongakawa), could proceed. In 2022, the Crown met with Ngati Whakahemo in Pukehina and agreed to enter into negotiations. In 2023, the claims committee established the Ngāti Whakahemo Claims Trust. As of 2025, this trust is seeking a mandate from Ngāti Whakahemo to pursue the negotiations on the iwi's behalf.

== Organisation ==
The Ngāti Whakahemo Iwi Authority represents the iwi for the purposes of the Resource Management Act 1991. It is an incorporated society with a board consisting of 4-5 members elected by iwi members. As of 2025, the chair is Mita Ririnui. In addition, as of 2025, the Ngāti Whakahemo Claims Trust is seeking a mandate to pursue treaty claims on behlaf of the iwi. Its chair is also Mita Ririnui.

=== Marae ===
Marae of Ngāti Whakahemo.
1 Pukehina
2 Te Awhe o te Rangi

The iwi has no hapū. It is affiliated with two marae:

Marae	Wharenui	Address
Pukehina	Tawakemoetahanga	1903 SH2, Pukehina
Te Awhe o te Rangi	Te Awhe o te Rangi	29 Te Awhe Road, Maketū

Pukehina is the main marae; Te Awhe o te Rangi is shared with several other iwi.

=== Communications ===
Te Arawa FM is the radio station of Te Arawa iwi, including Ngāti Pikiao, Tūhourangi and Ngāti Whakaue. It was established in the early 1980s and became a charitable entity in November 1990. The station underwent a major transformation in 1993, becoming Whanau FM. One of the station's frequencies was taken over by Mai FM in 1998; the other became Pumanawa FM before later reverting to Te Arawa FM. It is available on 89.0 FM in Rotorua.

== See also ==
- List of Māori iwi

== Bibliography ==
- Stafford, D.M. (1967). Te Arawa: A History of the Arawa People. Rotorua, New Zealand: A.H. & A.W. Reed.
