= Costamare =

Greek and Marshall Islands containership company

- Type: Public
- Traded as: NYSE: CMRE; Russell 2000 Component
- Industry: Shipping
- Founded: 1975; 51 years ago
- Founder: Vassilis C. Constantakopoulos
- Headquarters: Athens, Monaco
- Area served: Worldwide
- Key people: Konstantinos V. Konstantakopoulos (Charman & CEO)
- Revenue: US$793.63 million (2021)
- Operating income: US$441.35 million (2021)
- Net income: US$435.12 million (2021)
- Total assets: US$4.407 billion (2021)
- Total equity: US$1.725 billion (2021)
- Owner: Konstantinos V. Konstantakopoulos (25.9%); Achilleas V. Konstantakopoulos (18.0%); Christos V. Konstantakopoulos (16.9%)
- Number of employees: 2,750 (2021)
- Website: www.costamare.com

Costamare Inc. (NYSE:CMRE) is a Greek and Marshall Islands corporation and one of the world's leading owners and providers of containerships for charter. Its headquarters are in Athens, Greece. Costamare Inc. has 37 years of history in the international shipping industry and a fleet of 56 containerships, with a total capacity of approximately 326,000 twenty-foot equivalent units (TEU) including 10 newbuild containerships on order.

== Mission statement ==
The company's strategy is to time-charter its containerships to a geographically diverse, financially strong and loyal group of leading liner companies. The containerships operate primarily under multi-year time charters and therefore are not subject to the effect of seasonal variations in demand.

== History ==
The name “Costamare” was first used in the shipping industry in 1975 when Captain Vasileios Constantakopoulos, the father of the company's chairman and chief executive officer, Konstantinos Constantakopoulos, founded Costamare Shipping Company S.A. (“Costamare Management”) to serve as the manager of the then existing fleet of ships directly or indirectly owned by the Constantakopoulos family

=== Historical highlights ===
- 1975 Costamare Management is established by a Greek Captain Vasileios Constantakopoulos. At the same time Captain Vasileios Constantakopoulos acquires his first ship, a cargo vessel of 2,000 tons.
- 1984 Diversification into containership ownership and management with the purchase of four containerships of 1,000 TEU capacity.
- 1987 Acquisition of more, younger and bigger, containerships including six of 965 TEU capacity and two ex-US Lines' owned containerships, of 2,500 TEU each.
- 1994 The first newbuildings are ordered – three 3,500 TEU ships from Samsung Heavy Industries Co., Ltd. to be delivered in 1996. This brings the fleet to 32 cellular ships.
- 1997 The founders and Costamare Management move to their new purpose-built headquarters in Athens, Greece.
- 1998 Five post-panamax containerships of 6,500 TEU capacity are ordered, the largest for construction in South Korea and the first post-panamaxes for an independent containership owner.
- 1998 Konstantinos Constantakopoulos takes over from his father as CEO of Costamare Management.
- 2001 CIEL Shipmanagement S.A.is launched as an independent ship management company, bringing further flexibility and benchmarking to the management of the Costamare fleet of containerships.
- 2003 Five ships of more than 8,000 TEU capacity each are ordered from Hyundai Heavy Industries Co. Ltd. to be delivered in 2006. In due course these containerships are expanded in design to 9,500 TEU capacity each.
- 2005 Shanghai Costamare Ship Management Co., Ltd is established in Shanghai, P.R. China.
- 2006 On delivery, the latest Hyundai newbuildings become five of the largest containerships afloat and commence 12-year charters to Cosco Container Lines.
- 2006 C-Man Maritime Inc. begins operations in the Philippines as an exclusive manning and training affiliate for Costamare Management and its management contractors.
- 2008 Under an agreement with German classification society Germanischer Lloyd, five of the Costamare fleet of containerships operationally pioneer a new carbon emissions indexing tool, making them the first worldwide to fully comply with new international guidelines on CO_{2} indexing.
- 2010 Delivery of the latest addition to the Costamare fleet of containerships, the 8,350 TEU capacity newbuilding containership, MSC Navarino, constructed by Hudong-Zhonghua Shipbuilding (Group) Co. Ltd., China.
- 2010 The Company successfully completes its initial public offering, issuing 13.3 million shares
- 2011 Company continues to expand counter cyclically its fleet, taking delivery of nine second hand vessels and contracting 10 newbuildings.

== Fleet ==
In 2000 it controlled 21 ships, in 2008, 53, and 43 in 2010. As of Oct 2018 it had 74 ships with 16 vessels in new or extended time charters. In 2010 it completed a US$159.6 million IPO to fund an expansion of its fleet COSCO Guangzhou is a container ship, and one of the largest currently in service. Owned by Costamare and chartered to COSCO

Vessel Class	Capacity (TEU)	Fleet
ULCS	10000+	0
VLCS	8500-10000	15
Post Panamax	5100- 8500	13
Panamax	3500- 5100	14
Sub Panamax	2000- 3500	11
Feeder	up to 2000	3
Total		56

== Accidents and incidents ==
=== MV Rena ===
In October 2011 the MV Rena, carrying 1,368 containers, as well as 1,700 tonnes of heavy fuel oil and 200 tonnes of marine diesel, ran aground on the Astrolabe Reef near Tauranga, New Zealand. The resulting oil spill was labelled New Zealand's "worst ever environmental disaster"; the ship's captain—"an experienced master" with "an exemplary record", according to Costamare—was charged for "operating a vessel in a manner causing unnecessary danger or risk". The ship was fully certified and had been inspected by the Flag State and New Zealand Port State Control (in August and September 2011 respectively). They found no problems.

On 25 May 2012, the captain and navigation officer of the Rena at the time of the incident, appeared in Tauranga District Court for sentencing. Each was sentenced to seven months imprisonment after being found guilty under the Maritime Transport Act for operating a vessel in a manner likely to cause danger, under the Resource Management Act (RMA) for discharging a contaminant and three charges under the Crimes Act for willfully attempting to alter the course of justice by altering ship's documents after the grounding. Owners Daina Shipping, a subsidiary of Costamare, was reported to have spent 235 million NZD on the salvage and cleanup operations.
