= Maruāhaira =

Places in the life of Maruāhaira
1 Tawhitirahi
2 Te Whakaroa, Waimata
3 Hakuranui, Tōrere
4 Whakatane
5 Pukehina

Maruāhaira was a Māori rangatira (chief) of Rangihouhiri and the ancestor of the Ngāti Whakahemo iwi. He accompanied his people on a great migration from Tawhitirahi, near Opotiki in New Zealand, to Te Whakaroa on the East Cape, and on to Tōrere in the eastern Bay of Plenty. As a result of an insult received from his son-in-law, he led a military expedition against the Waitaha iwi and seized Pukehina from them.

== Life ==
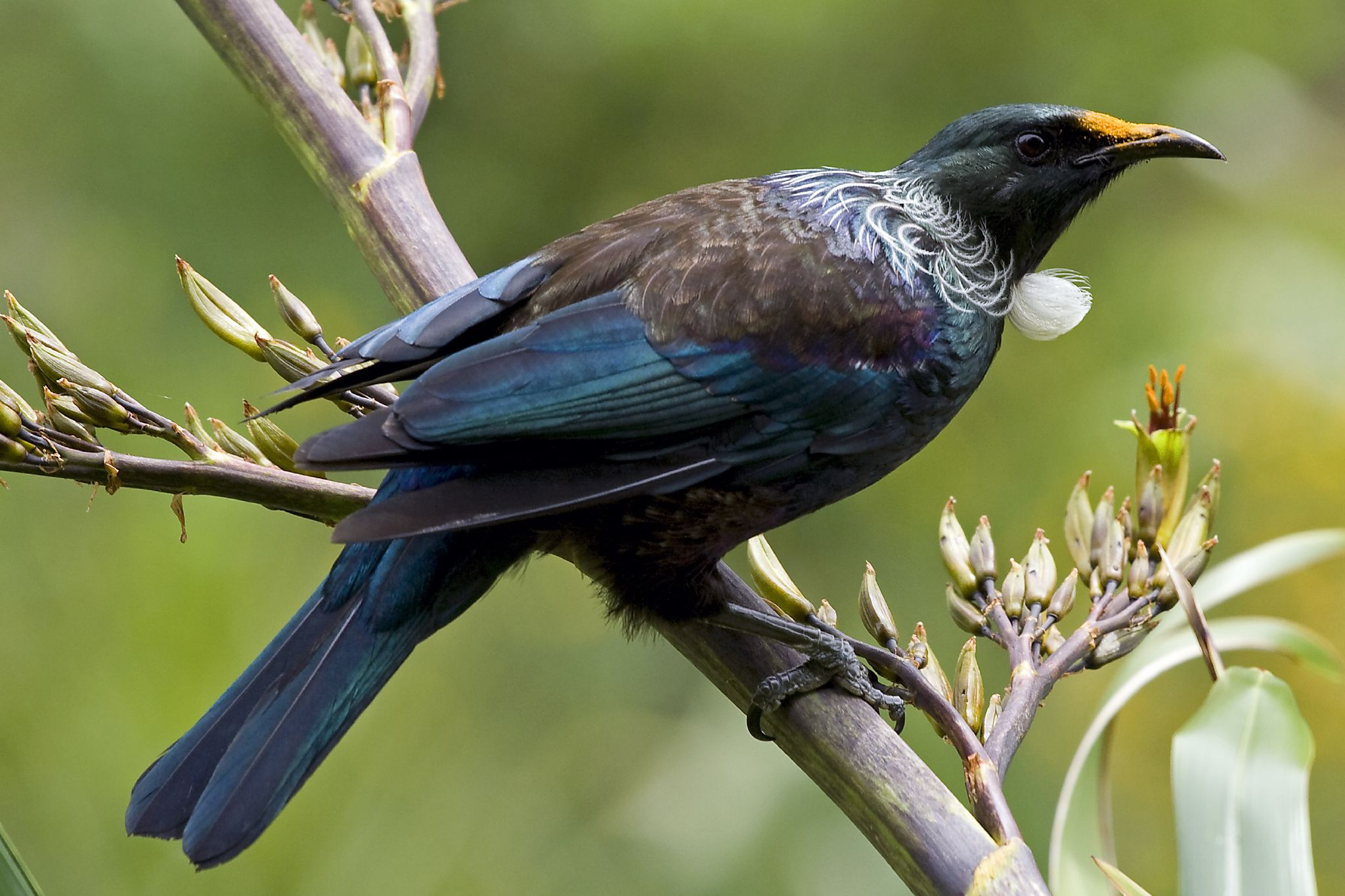
Tūī

Maruāhaira was the son of Tamatea-Tokinui, through whom he was a direct descendant of Kahungunu and Tamatea Arikinui, captain of the Tākitimu canoe. He belonged to Ngāi te Rangihouhiri, which was initially based at Tawhitirahi pā next to the Kukumoa stream, west of Opotiki.

=== Te Heke o Te Rangihouhiri ===
Kahukino, the rangatira of the pā, had a pet tūī, which could sing and talk on command. A visitor from Ngāti Hā asked for this tūī as a gift, but Kahukino refused, so Ngāti Hā attacked and drove Ngāi Te Rangihouhiri out of the region. This began a long period of migration for Rangihouhiri, known as Te Heke o Te Rangihouhiri.

They fled all the way to the East Cape, where they were given refuge by Te Waho-o-te-rangi, who settled them on Te Whakaroa mountain on the Waimata River, where they were required to hunt birds and rats for him. Later, he decided to kill all of the refugees, but they found out about his plans and ambushed the attack force. Then, Maruāhaira, along with Rangihouhiri, Rangihouhiri's son Tutenaehe, and Te Hapu, led the people away from Te Whakaroa. They settled at Hakuranui at Tōrere on the Bay of Plenty (northeast of their original home at Tawhitirahi).

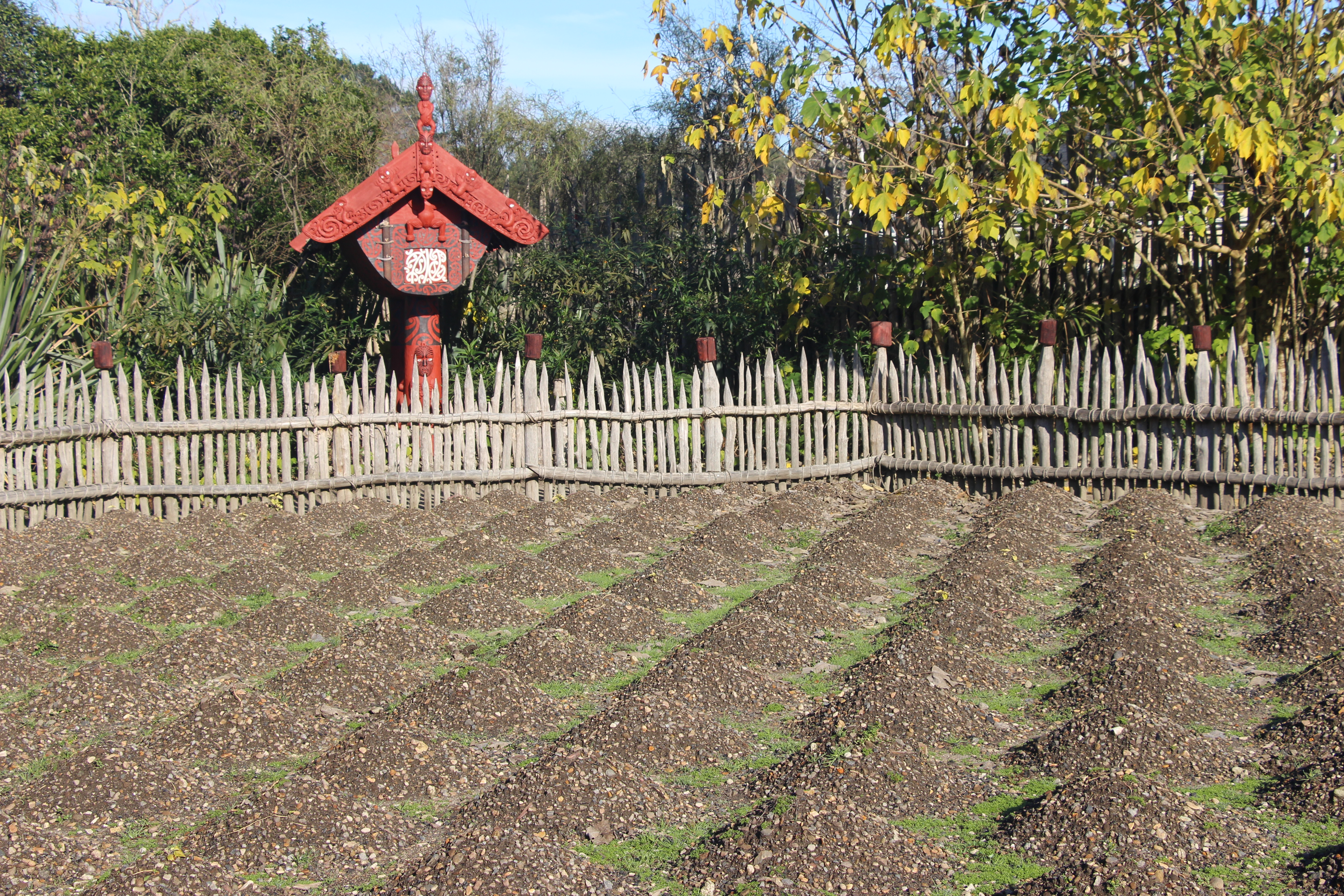
Rows of puke (earth mounds) for planting kūmara (Te Parapara in the Hamilton Gardens, Waikato)

Tōrere was already inhabited by Ngāitai, who became hostile to Ngāi Te Rangihouhiri, after a man of Ngāi Te Rangihouhiri called Tongarewa killed Te Whanaoterangi of Ngāitai. Penu of Ngāitai led a war party against Ngāi Te Rangihouhiri and killed a man called Tukoukou, while he was out sowing kūmara seeds. Two men from the Waitaha iwi of Te Arawa, called Pohu and Matauaua, happened to be travelling through Tōrere at the time and they were accused of stealing the Tukoukou's remains from a canoe where they had been being stored. They were forced to flee. Later, another man from Te Arawa, called Te Aoterangi, was shipwrecked in the area, so Maruāhaira's son-in-law, Taiwhakaea killed him in revenge for the theft of Tukoukou's remains. Tamateapaia also led a war party to attack Te Arawa at Pakotore, but was defeated.

=== Conflict with Waitaha ===
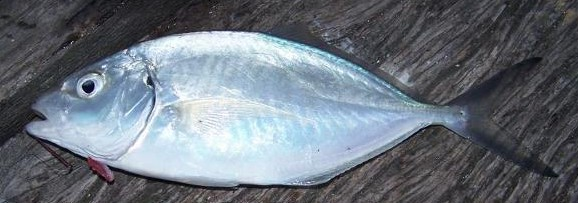
Araara (trevally)

Maruāhaira had two daughters, Tutapuaekura and Kuaotakapu. Tutapuaekura married Taiwhakaea and settled with him at Whakatane, while Kuaotakapu married Te Arairehe of Waitaha and settled with him at Pukehina. Te Arairehe asked the chief of Pukehina, Poutuia, to let Maruāhaira come and settle with them at Pukehina, but Poutia refused. Maruāhaira therefore went to Whakatane and sent his son Maraika to visit Pukehina. There he learnt that while the people of Waitaha had been fishing, one of them had caught an araara (trevally) and Te Arairehe had called it "the head of Maruāhaira." It was a grave insult to compare a distingusihed person to a food stuff and Maruāhaira was very angry when he heard about it.

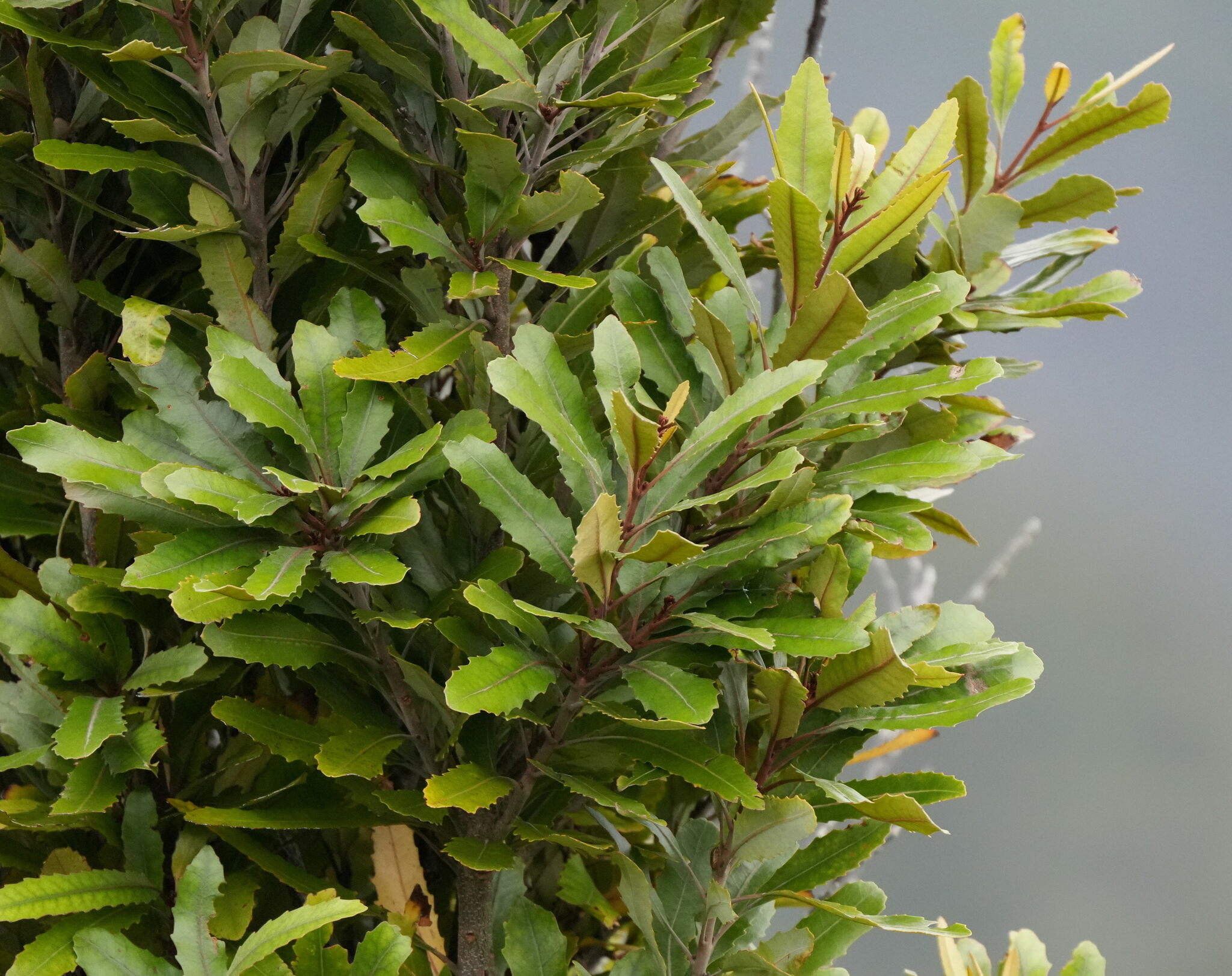
Leaves of the rewarewa

In his anger, Maruāhaira summoned warriors of Ngāi Te Rangihouhiri from Tōrere and Whakatane and led them in a successful attack on Pukehina. Te Arairehe and his friends fled towards Rotoehu and Maruāhaira and Maraika pursued them. During the pursuit, Maraika killed Poutia. When Maraika reached Punamate, he put a rewarewa leaf in his hair to indicate that he claimed all the land up to this point and would pursue the enemies no further. He made this claim while he was still leading the pursuit and before Waitaha had actually been defeated. Along with Pukehina, Maruāhaira also captured Poutuia pā and Oreiwhata. Maruāhaira settled with some of his followers at Pukehina, where they became Ngāti Whakahemo.

== Family and legacy ==
Maruāhaira married twice and had children by both wives. One wife was Hinepatutiaterangi, a daughter of Turirangi and a direct descendant of Tama-te-kapua, the captain of the Arawa canoe, which brought Te Arawa from Hawaiki to New Zealand. Their children were:

- Tutapuaekura (daughter), who married Taiwhakaea and settled with him at Whakatane
- Maraika (son)
- Kuaotakapu (daughter), who married Te Arairehe of Waitaha and settled with him at Pukehina

Maruāhaira's other wife was Uekohu, a daughter of Rongotakai according to D. N. Stafford or of Huriwairoa according to Steedman, and a direct descendant of Waitaha and Hei, who came to New Zealand on the Arawa canoe. They had one child:

- Patukarihi

== Bibliography ==
- Stafford, D.M. (1967). Te Arawa: A History of the Arawa People. Rotorua, New Zealand: A.H. & A.W. Reed.
- Steedman, J.A.W. (1984). Ngā Ohaaki o ngā Whānau o Tauranga Moana: Māori History and Genealogy of the Bay of Plenty.
- Mitchell, J. H. (2014). Takitimu: A History of Ngati Kahungunu. Libro International. ISBN 978-1-877514-72-2.
