= Penguin sweater =

Sweater knitted for penguins in oil slicks

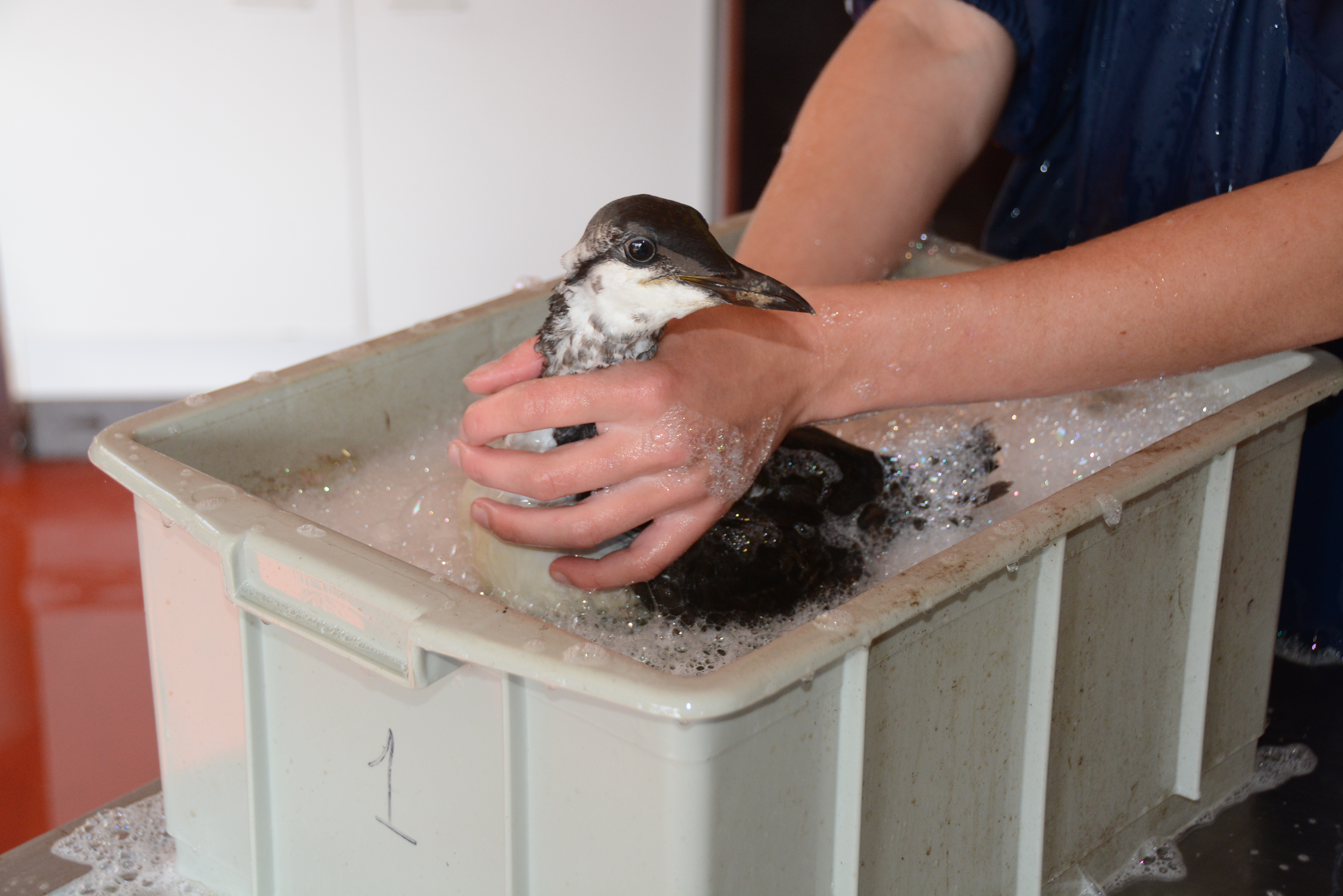
Washing a victim of oil spills

Penguin sweaters, also known as penguin jumpers, are sweaters knitted for penguins that have been caught in oil slicks. When an oil spill affects penguins they have in the past been sometimes dressed in knitted sweaters, supposedly to stop them from poisoning themselves by ingesting the oil during preening, and to keep them warm, since the spilled oil destroys their natural oils. The sweaters are removed and discarded as soon as the penguins can be washed.

== History ==
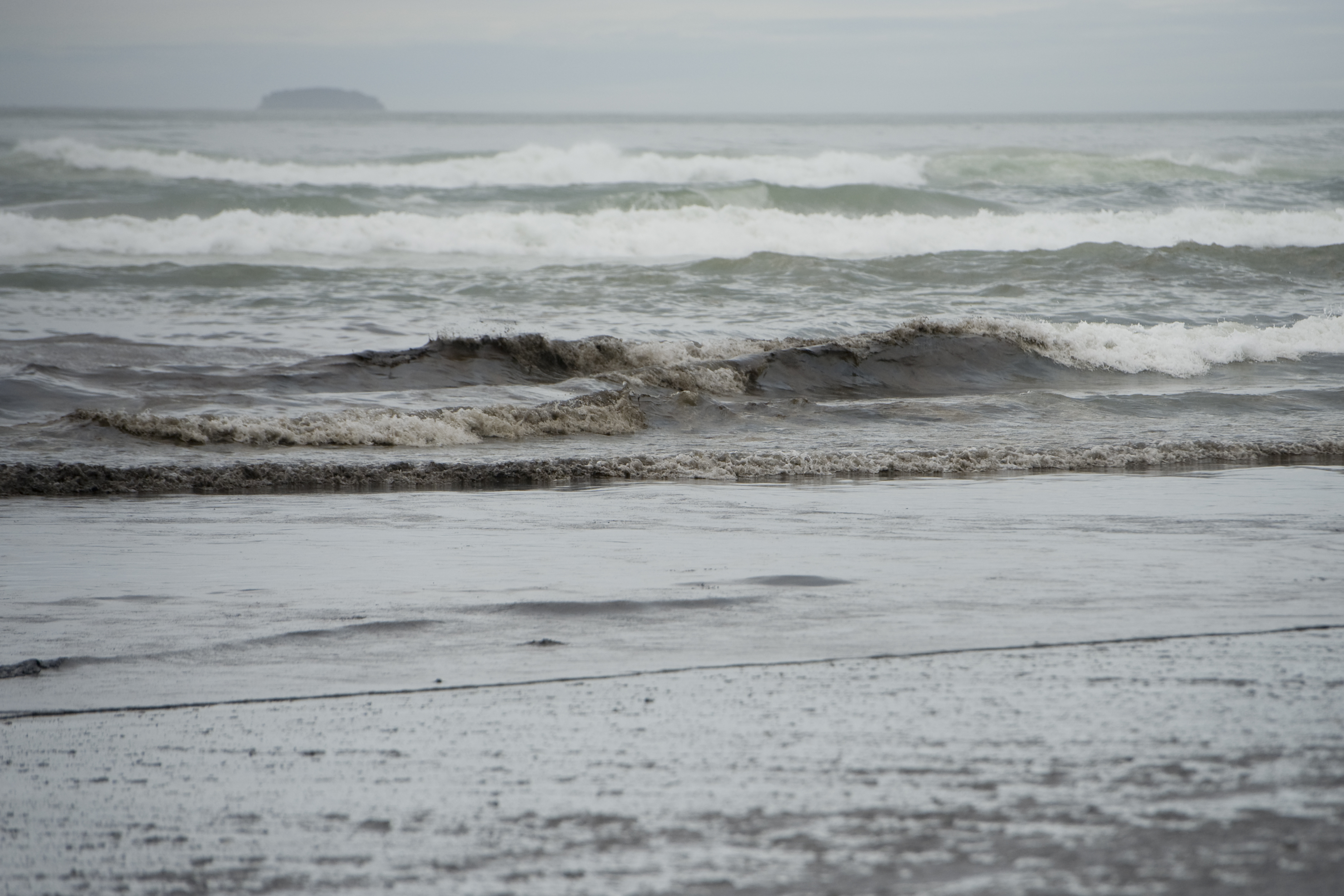
Aftermath of Rena oil spill

Penguin Jumpers were invented by Clare Davis (a founder of WildLife Victoria) and brought to life by her friend Margaret Healy and another one of Clares Friends. The project originated with the Phillip Island Nature Park oil spill of January 2000 and was successfully completed, but the knitting pattern and call for volunteers to donate remained available online. Instead of the 100 or so sweaters needed, thousands were sent. The extra sweaters were stockpiled by the Tasmanian Conservation Trust. As of 2014, the Australia-based Penguin Foundation is still accepting handmade sweaters but no longer uses these for penguin rehabilitation. Instead, these sweaters are used to dress toy penguins which are then sold to raise money for the foundation. After a 2011 oil spill in New Zealand, a local yarn shop put out the call for penguin jumpers, and supplied a pattern. Jumpers were received from all over the world. However, those cleaning and rehabilitating the penguins affected said they neither used nor requested the jumpers: heat lamps were used to keep cleaned penguins warm. Once they are cleaned, there is little danger of them ingesting oil when preening – one of the rationales given for penguin sweaters – and sweaters may in fact do more harm than good to the penguins. A penguin wetsuit has been made for a penguin who lost his feathers, and similar garments are being made for battery chicken rehabilitation.

== Controversy and potential risks ==
The use of penguin sweaters has been criticized as a potential risk to the health of the penguins, as wearing foreign garments can cause additional stress to the penguins and adversely affect their health. Instead, some wildlife rescues use heat lamps to help regulate the temperature of the birds and prevent excessive preening. The International Bird Rescue does not use penguin sweaters or any bird sweaters, because of the dangers of placing a garment on the birds that presses the oil against their skin and prevents the fumes from the oil from dissipating. Another potential risk of using penguin sweaters is that handling or wearing foreign materials can cause additional stress to the penguins.

Peter Dann, of the Philip Island Nature Park, stated that the Little Penguins dealt with by Philip Island Nature Park have different needs than the African Penguins International Bird Rescue, and that there were comparable rates of success for rehabilitating Little Penguins with sweaters and African Penguins with heat lamps.
