= Navarino Icons =

- Product type: Food products Art objects
- Current owner: TEMES S.A.
- Country: Greece
- Introduced: 2011
- Related brands: Costa Navarino
- Markets: Worldwide
- Registered as a trademark in: EU: 010038289; US: 85332767
- Ambassador: Vassilis C. Constantakopoulos
- Website: NavarinoProducts

Navarino Icons is a brand of food products and art objects introduced in 2011 by Costa Navarino, the prime, sustainable destination in the Mediterranean, located in Messinia developed by the Tourism Enterprises of Messinia S. A. (TEMES S.A.). Navarino Icons brand of food products and art objects are based on the history and culture of the Messinian region and the Peloponnese of Greece.

== History ==
The Navarino Icons brand was launched in 2011 by Costa Navarino with the aim to promote the history and culture of the Messinian region and the Peloponnese of Greece worldwide through their traditional food and art. According to Donna Paul in the Edible Manhattan, "the story begins with a mother. Maria Balafouti runs the Folklore Museum (that I visited) in a small village named Yalova. She started to make spoon sweets to treat the guests of the museum. Soon she began to make spoon sweets for Costa Navarino. They now have a small company employing five local women that make what you’ll find at Dean & Deluca."

On October 13, 2011, the Navarino Icons brand was registered as a European Union Community Trade Mark, with registration number 010038289, belonging to the Tourism Enterprises of Messinia S. A. (TEMES S.A.). An application for a United States federal trademark was filed by the Tourism Enterprises of Messinia S. A. (TEMES S.A.) on May 27, 2011; its serial number is 85332767, and the status is Notice of Allowance - Issued.

Costa Navarino, which manages the Navarino Icons brand, is the prime, sustainable destination in the Mediterranean, located in Messinia. It was developed by the Tourism Enterprises of Messinia S. A. (TEMES S.A.), a development company founded by Vassilis C. Constantakopoulos.

== Products ==
Navarino Icons food products and art objects are made by local Messinian and Peloponnese Greeks based on their history and culture, using their traditional methods. Traditional Mycenaean Greece recipes are used to make the food products, and the art objects are also based on the Mycenaean traditional arts. Navarino Icons sources its raw materials locally, from the Messinian region and the Peloponnese of Greece. Vasiliki Mitrakos acknowledged—in her contribution to the Reinventing Greece Media Project—that the Navarino Icons range features hand-made crafts by local artisans and organic food products from sustainable farms.

The food products of Navarino Icons includes extra virgin olive oil, olives, Sesame seed candy (pasteli), traditional Greek sweets, fresh fruit marmalades, biscuits made from extra virgin olive oil and oranges, honey, roasted red peppers and eggplants, dips of peppers-tomatoes and pasta. The art objects includes ceramic arts of dice, doll figurine, dish, sandal and animal figures, and paper crafts of 3D animal figures and jigsaw puzzles with themes from Mycenaean frescoes.

== Distribution ==
Hellenic Duty Free Shops, Dean & Deluca and Attica Department Stores are some of the outlets that distribute the Navarino Icons range of food products and art objects. According to TravelPulse, "the Navarino Icons series is already available exclusively in Dean & Deluca stores in the United States." Costa Navarino also has a cooperation with Lufthansa to promote the Navarino Icons brand to Lufthansa passengers worldwide. The Navarino Icons range are featured at Lufthansa Business Lounges.

== Recognition ==
Navarino Icons and Dean & DeLuca were jointly nominated for the Hellenic American Leadership Council (HALC)'s Best & Worst of the Week series in March 2012 for embracing programs aimed at promoting Greek products. In April 2012, the products of Navarino Icons were showcased at the Greek Orthodox Easter Traditions Regimen and Products event organized by the Embassy of Greece in Washington, D.C., where Navarino Icons and Dean & DeLuca jointly showcased Greek gastronomy.
