= International Bird Rescue =

US-based nonprofit organization

- Founded: 1971; 55 years ago Berkeley, California, US
- Founders: Alice Berkner, Raymond Balter, James Harris, Ralph Steiner, Joshua Lichterman
- Type: Non-governmental environmental organization
- Purpose: Environmentalism, Conservation biology, Wildlife rehabilitation
- Locations: Cordelia, California, US; San Pedro, Los Angeles, US
- Region served: Worldwide
- Key people: JD Bergeron, CEO
- Website: www.birdrescue.org
- Formerly called: International Bird Rescue Research Center

International Bird Rescue is a nonprofit organization that rehabilitates injured aquatic birds, most notably seabirds affected by oil spills. Founded by Alice Berkner and members of the Ecology Action, including veterinarian James Michael Harris, D.V.M. in 1971 and based in Cordelia, California, the group has developed scientifically based bird rehabilitation techniques and has led oiled wildlife rescue efforts in more than 200 oil spills worldwide, including the 1989 Exxon Valdez oil spill in Prince William Sound, Alaska, and the 2010 Deepwater Horizon oil spill in the Gulf of Mexico, where International Bird Rescue co-managed oiled bird rehabilitation efforts in four states with Tri-State Bird Rescue and Research.

Formerly known as International Bird Rescue Research Center, the organization cares for an estimated 5,000 birds annually at two rehabilitation centers, the Los Angeles Oiled Bird Care and Education Center and the San Francisco Bay Oiled Wildlife Care and Education Center, that also serve as primary care facilities for oiled birds in the event of a spill in California. Common bird species treated include brown pelicans, common murres, western grebes, Pacific loons, and a variety of gulls, herons, and other waterfowl.

International Bird Rescue is a member of the Oiled Wildlife Care Network (OWCN), which is managed by the UC Davis School of Veterinary Medicine on behalf of the State of California.

== History ==
=== 1970s ===
On January 19, 1971, two Standard Oil tankers, the Arizona Standard and the Oregon Standard, collided near San Francisco's Golden Gate Bridge, resulting in a spill that covered 50 miles of coastline with 2,700 cubic tons of crude oil. About 7,000 birds were oiled by the spill. Volunteers collected nearly 4,300 of them, mainly western grebes and scoters, and brought them to makeshift rehabilitation centers. Only about 300 were released—in part given the lack of established oiled bird rehabilitation practices at the time. "There were dying birds everywhere and no one knew what to do. It was as horrible as you can imagine," Jay Holcomb, International Bird Rescue's former executive director, told the San Francisco Chronicle in 2012.

While documented rehabilitation efforts of oiled seabirds in California dates back to the 1940s, the 1971 San Francisco Bay Arizona & Oregon Standard spill, and the 1969 Santa Barbara/Union Platform A spill that preceded it, spurred new efforts to create permanent rehabilitation facilities and programs, as well as to monitor seabird mortality resulting from spills. Alice Berkner, a retired nurse and animal lover who assisted in oiled bird rehabilitation following the Standard Oil accident, became the first Executive Director of International Bird Rescue—originally called International Bird Rescue Research Center—in May 1971. The fledgling organization was housed in a small space above the Berkeley Humane Society, and in 1975 moved to Berkeley's Aquatic Park on a $5-per-year lease from the city.

=== 1980s and 1990s ===
The organization co-published Rehabilitating Oiled Seabirds: A Field Manual (1986). Advancements made included best practices for washing oiled birds, warm water pool therapy, and net bottom cages to help prevent sternum and hock lesions in diving birds, auks, and other aquatic species. In 1986, Jay Holcomb became executive director of the organization.

Throughout the 1980s and 1990s, the organization's oiled wildlife response efforts extended well beyond California. International Bird Rescue staff spent six months managing three bird centers and two search-and-collection programs in the 1989 Exxon Valdez disaster, where 11 million gallons of crude oil spilled into Alaska's Prince William Sound, killing between 100,000 and 250,000 seabirds. Exxon Valdez was the first major spill where field stabilization and transport were utilized extensively in oiled wildlife care.

Following the Exxon Valdez incident, Congress passed and President George H. W. Bush signed into law the U.S. Oil Pollution Act (OPA) of 1990. Among other requirements, the law mandates more stringent oil spill contingency planning by industry that included oiled wildlife emergency response.

Several bills passed in California in the mid-1990s led to the creation of the Oiled Wildlife Care Network (OWCN), formed as part of the Office of Spill Prevention and Response and administered by the University of California, Davis, School of Veterinary Medicine. New rehabilitation facilities, such as those currently managed by International Bird Rescue, were designed to prevent disease transmission among avian patients and to minimize historic challenges associated with animal husbandry.

=== 2000 onwards ===
During the 2000 Treasure Spill near Cape Town, South Africa, International Bird Rescue was mobilized by its partner in international oil spill response, the International Fund for Animal Welfare (IFAW), to assist the Southern African Foundation for the Conservation of Coastal Birds (SANCCOB) in a massive effort to wash and rehabilitate more than 20,000 oiled African penguins. More than 90% of the oiled birds captured were released. In addition to the rehabilitation program, CapeNature initiated a large-scale capture program on nearby islands and successfully relocated more than 19,500 non-oiled penguins.

International Bird Rescue saw perhaps the most extensive international attention of its near-40-year existence in 2010 following the explosion of Deepwater Horizon, a semi-submersible mobile offshore drilling unit owned and operated by Transocean and leased by BP on the Macondo Prospect oil field in the Gulf of Mexico. The explosion and resulting fire on April 20, 2010, killed 11 workers and caused a sea-floor oil gusher that spewed 4.9 million barrels of crude oil before the wellhead was capped on July 15, 2010. The disaster remains the largest accidental marine oil spill in petroleum industry history. International Bird Rescue teamed up with Tri-State Bird Rescue and Research, the lead oiled wildlife organization on the ground, to co-manage oiled bird rehabilitation centers in Louisiana, Alabama, Mississippi, and Florida as part of a large-scale response to the incident that involved federal and state agencies, industry, and non-governmental organizations. More than 8,000 oiled birds were captured and collected both dead and alive, according to government figures, with 1,246 birds released back into the wild.

International Bird Rescue's efforts to save oiled birds during the spill were prominently featured in the Emmy Award-winning HBO documentary [ Saving Pelican 895, which chronicled the step-by-step rehabilitation efforts of a single juvenile brown pelican.

Post-Deepwater Horizon oil spills that International Bird Rescue has responded to include the Rena spill in New Zealand (at the request of Massey University's Wildlife Health Centre) and the Yellowstone River Silvertip Pipeline Spill Incident, both occurring in 2011.

A bitumen release in the Alberta Tar Sands in the summer of 2013 also led to a wildlife response by International Bird Rescue in partnership with two Canadian wildlife organizations.

Jay Holcomb, International Bird Rescue's executive director, director emeritus and an internationally known wildlife advocate, died on June 10, 2014, of kidney cancer. During his tenure he was a recipient of Oceana's Ocean Heroes Award, the John Muir Conservationist of the Year Award and the National Wildlife Rehabilitators Association's Lifetime Achievement Award. Following his death, Barbara Callahan, a longtime senior staff member of International Bird Rescue who trained under Holcomb and serves as global response director, was appointed interim executive director of the organization by the board of directors. In 2015 JD Bergeron was appointed Executive Director. Later the board changed his title to Chief Executive Director.

== Major oiled wildlife response efforts ==
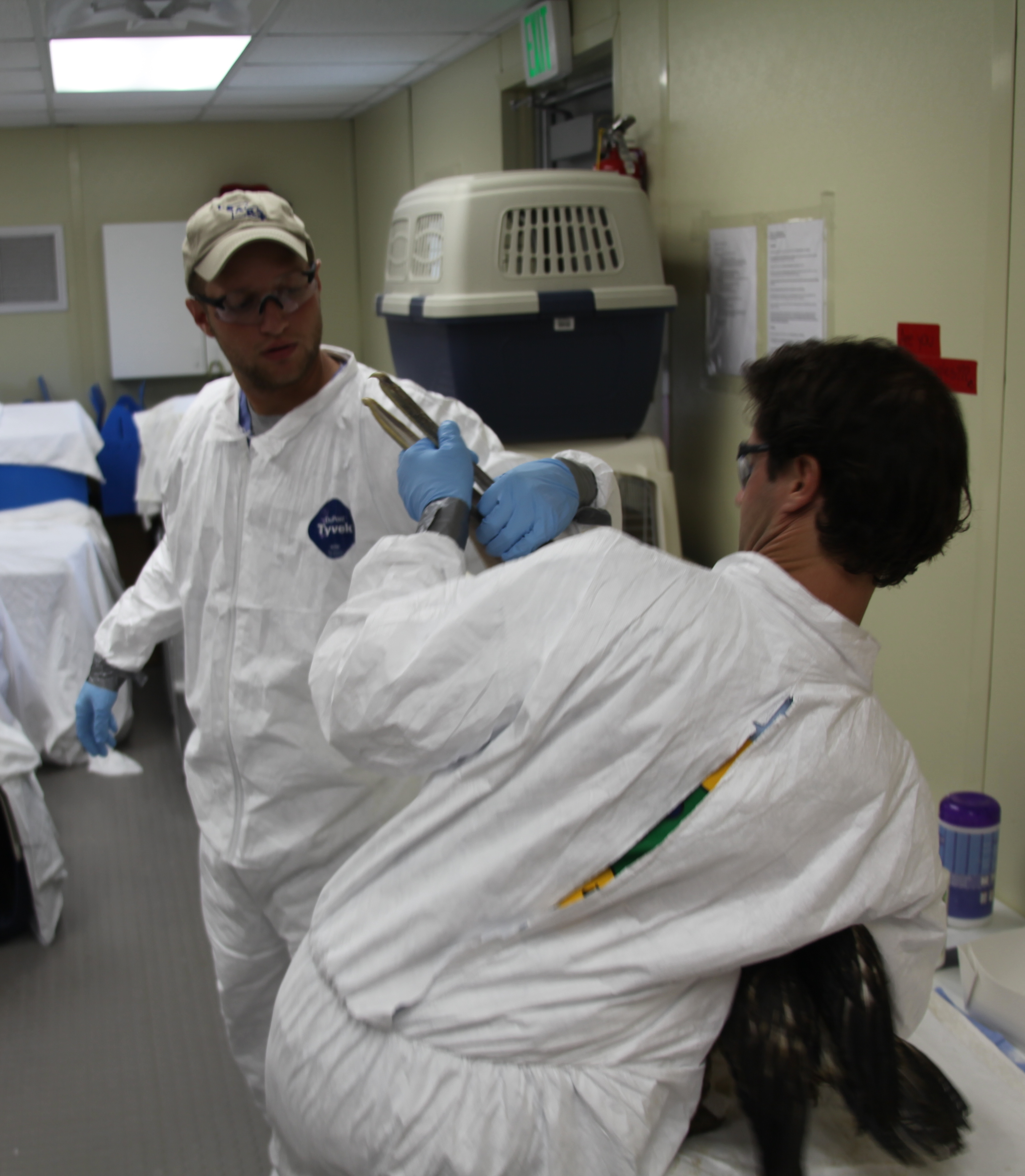
International Bird Rescue Research Center responders check out an oiled brown pelican at the stabilization site at the Grand Isle, Louisiana marine lab, during the 2010 Deepwater Horizon spill.

International Bird Rescue has responded to oil spills in countries such as the United States, France, Norway, Spain, South Africa, Australia, Ecuador, Argentina, and New Zealand. Among the most high-profile oiled wildlife response efforts include the 2011 Rena spill in New Zealand, the 2010 Deepwater Horizon spill in the Gulf of Mexico, the 2007 Cosco Busan spill in San Francisco Bay, the 2002 Prestige spill in Galicia, Spain; the 1999 MV Erika spill in Brittany, France; and the 1989 Exxon Valdez spill in Prince William Sound, Alaska.

== Oiled bird care protocol ==
After collection, each oiled bird is stabilized, which includes nutrition, hydration, and medical treatment before it is considered for a wash, as unstable birds may die from the resulting stress of the procedure. Once stable, an oiled bird goes through a series of tub washes with a low concentration of Dawn dishwashing liquid in clean water. Scientific studies dating back to the 1970s had identified Dawn, a brand owned by Procter & Gamble as the most effective detergent for removing petrochemicals from bird feathers, replacing earlier methods using solvents and products such as mascara remover, powdered chalk, and mineral oil. Additional research in 1995 confirmed that Dawn was the best available cleaning detergent for oiled wildlife because it easily removed oil without damaging a bird's plumage, irritating its skin, or posing additional health problems to the animals or the people involved in rehabilitation efforts.

== Aquatic bird rehabilitation ==
In addition to its oiled wildlife response efforts, International Bird Rescue cares for sick, injured, abused, and orphaned aquatic birds at its two year-round wildlife care centers in California.

Common human-caused injuries to aquatic birds include habitat destruction, plastic pollution, fishing hook lacerations, and fishing line entanglements. Some of these injuries are deliberate (and often illegal), such as gunshot wounds, beak cutting, pelican pouch slashings, and clipped wings.

While International Bird Rescue specializes in treating seabirds and other aquatic birds, the organization is also capable of working with non-aquatic birds, including owls, hawks, doves, finches, hummingbirds, pigeons, sparrows, and wild turkeys.

In January 2015, birds found along the eastern shore of the San Francisco Bay were found coated in a sticky substance, not crude oil, and were sent to IBR for cleanup efforts. Upwards of 200 birds were potentially affected. The source of this "mystery goo" has not yet been identified.

== Gallery ==
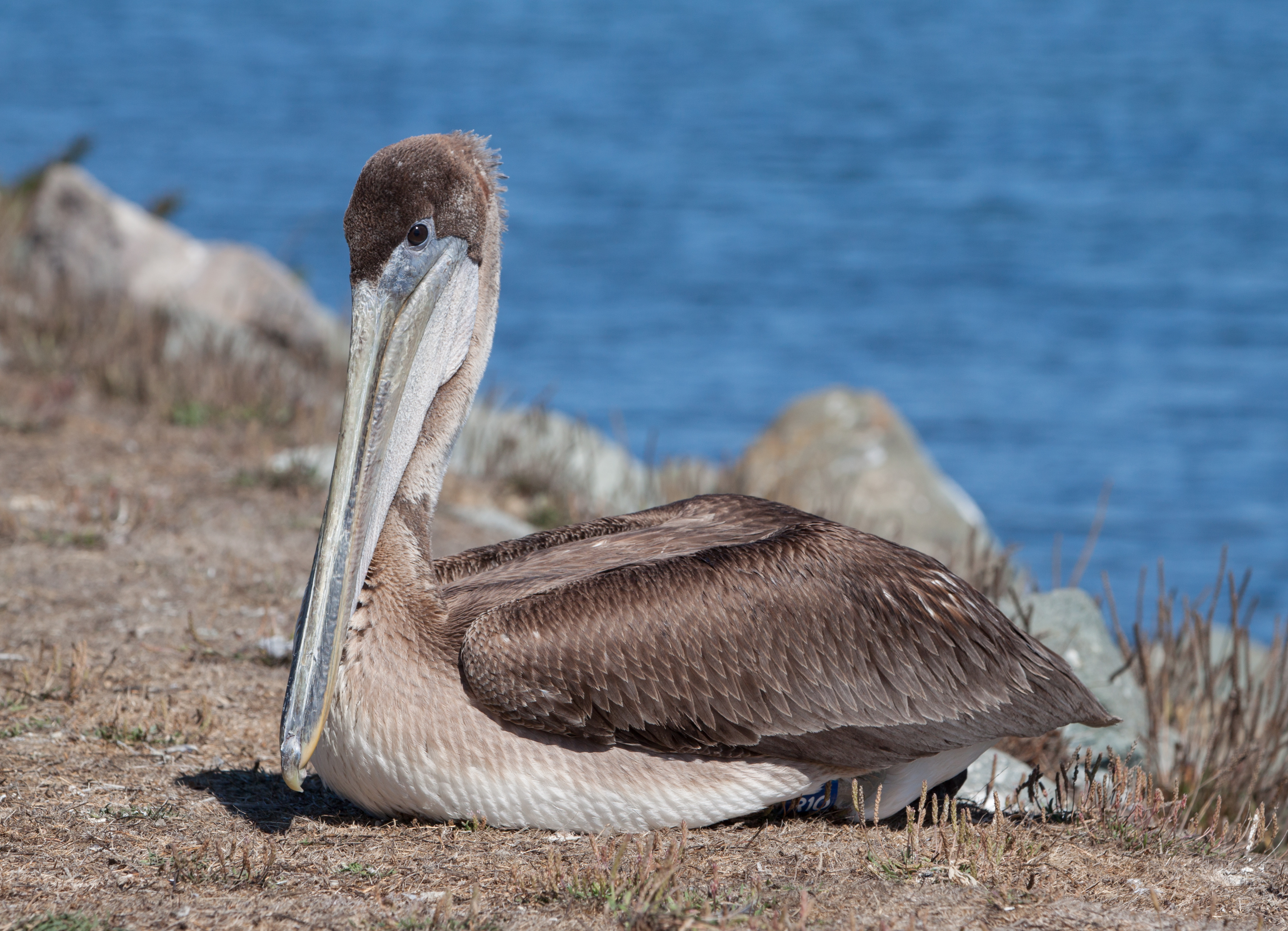
Brown pelican recovered and released by International Bird Rescue Center San Francisco in 2012

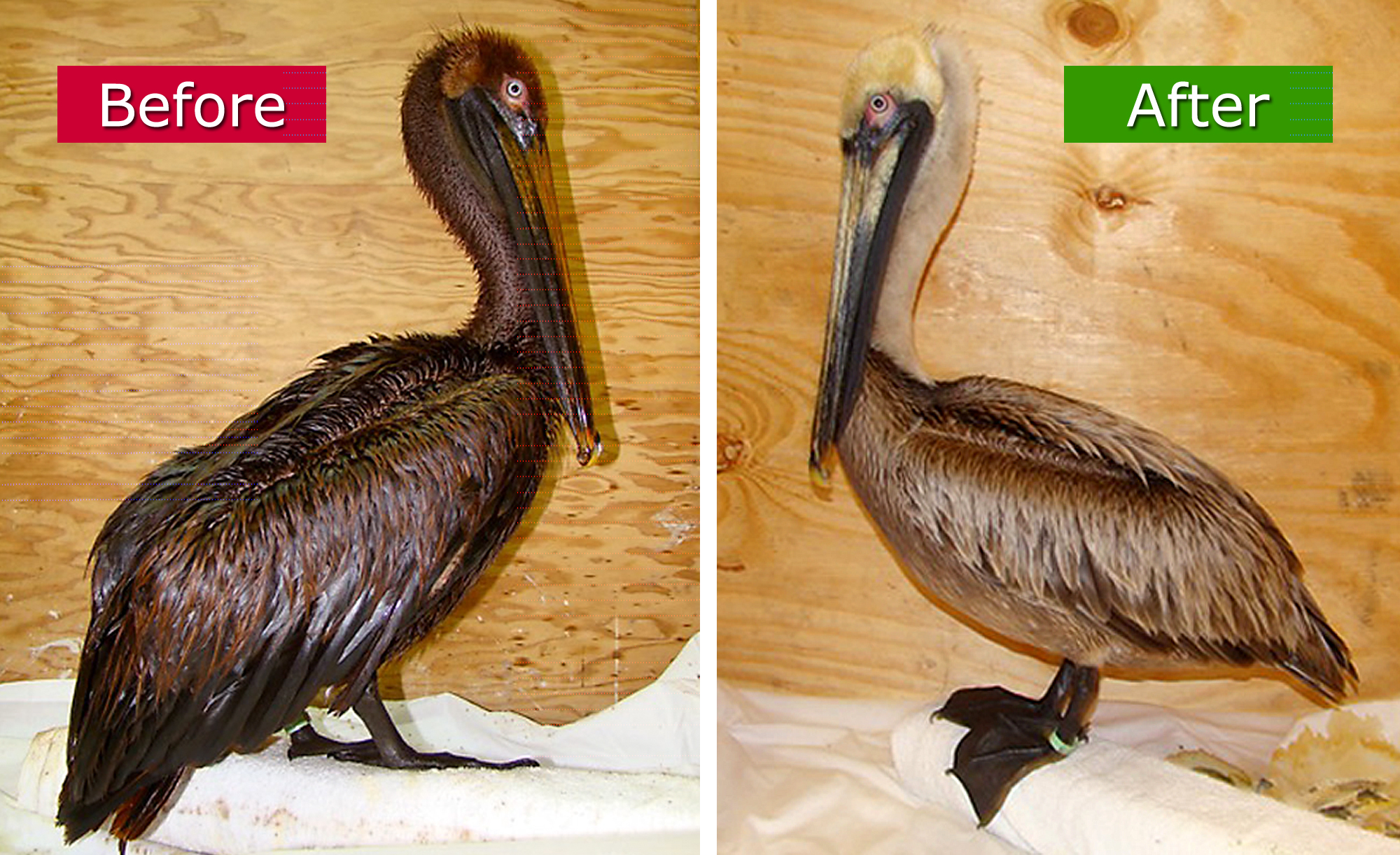
Before and after; oiled brown pelican washed at the Fort Jackson, Louisiana Oiled Wildlife Center, supported by the International Bird Rescue Research Center, May 2010

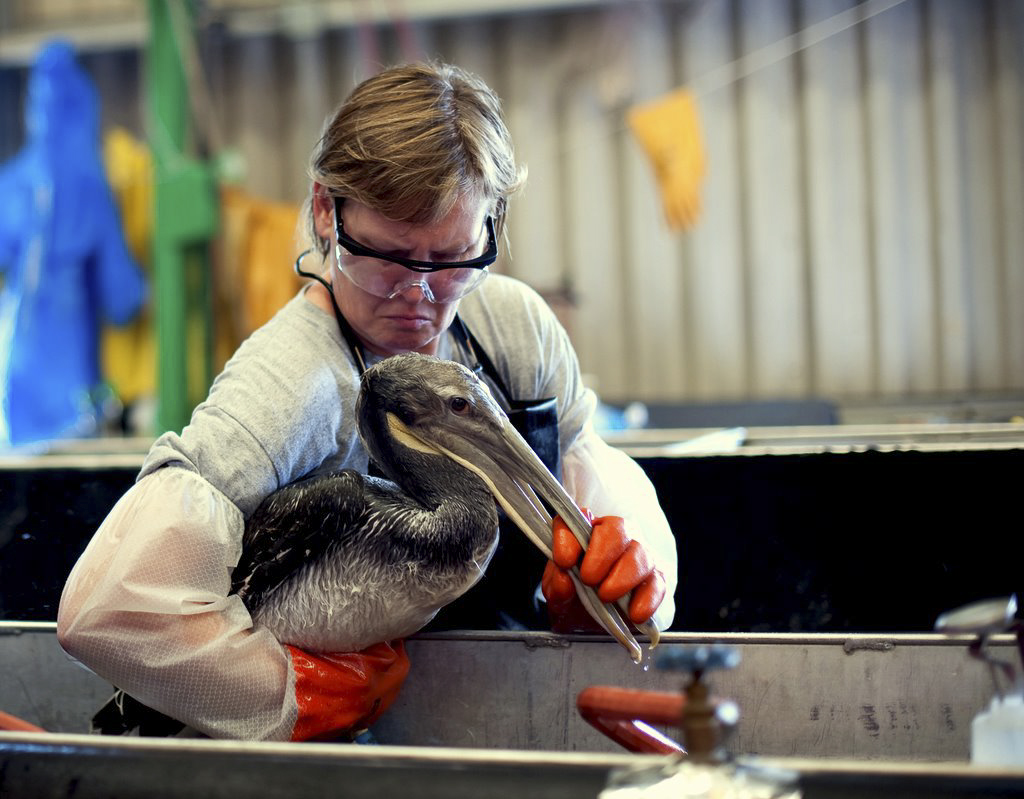
Images from Gulf Oil Spill Bird Treatment in Louisiana provided by IBRRC, June 2010

== Awards ==
- 2010 John Muir Conservationist of the Year Award, Jay Holcomb, International Bird Rescue
- 2000 Legacy Award, The Pacific States/British Columbia Oil Spill Task Force
- 1978 Feinstone Environmental Award, Alice Berkner, International Bird Rescue Research Center

== See also ==
- IFAW
- SANCCOB
