= Vassilis Constantakopoulos =

Greek entrepreneur (1935–2011)

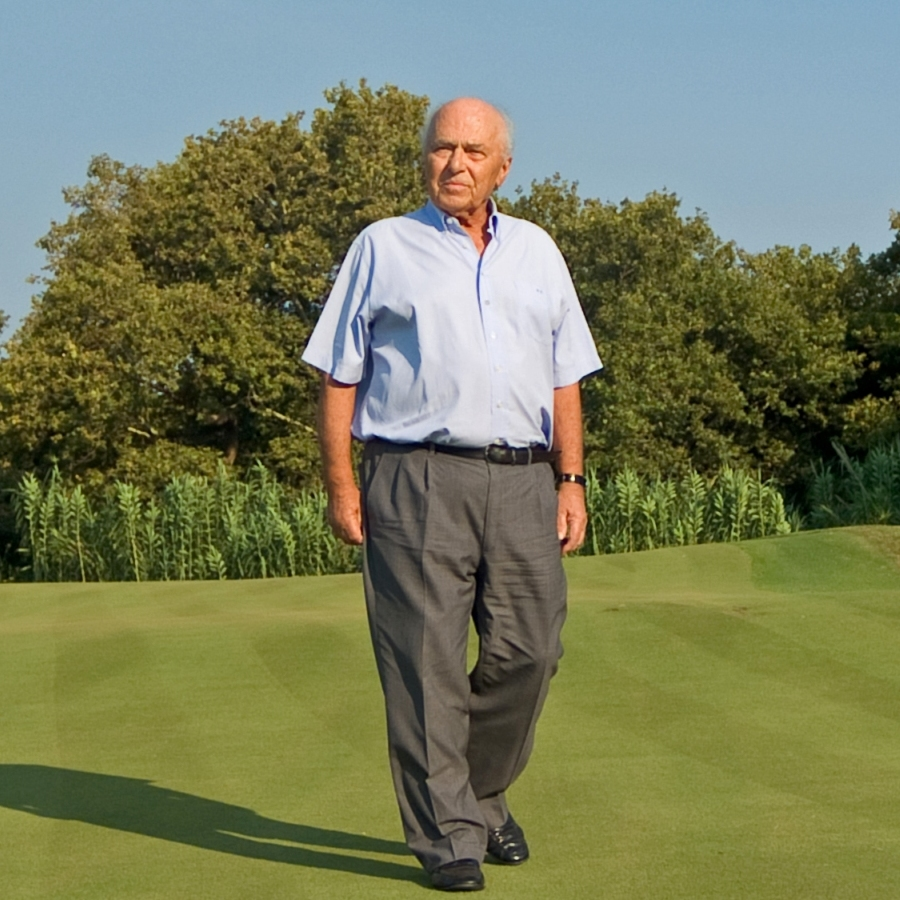
- Constantakopoulos in 2010
- Born: Vassilis C. Constantakopoulos; 29 June 1935; Diavolitsi, Messinia, Greece
- Died: 25 January 2011 (aged 75); Athens, Greece
- Occupations: Captain, Shipowner, entepreneur
- Spouse: Carmen Kiritsi
- Children: Achilleas,Costis,Christos

Vassilis C. Constantakopoulos (Greek: Βασίλειος Κωνσταντακόπουλος Vassilis Constantakopoulos; 29 June 1935 – 25 January 2011) was, a Greek captain, shipowner and entrepreneur.

== Personal life ==
Vassilis Constantakopoulos widely known as “Captain Vassilis” was born in 1935 into a low-income family in Diavolitsi, Messinia. After growing up in Messinia, he began a career on ships, gradually working his way up to master. . In 1948, he moved to Athens, where he worked in various jobs until 1953, when he first went to sea. He subsequently progressed through all ranks of the maritime hierarchy.|url=https://www.kathimerini.gr/society/430231/foros-timis-kai-mnimis-ston-kapetan-vasili/ |website=kathimerini |access-date=9 July 2025}}</ref>

Constantakopoulos was married to Carmen Kiritsi in 1964. They had three sons: : Konstantinos, known as Costis, Achilleas and Christos Constantakopoulos. .

== Career ==
At the age of 27, Vassilis Constantakopoulos purchased a small cargo vessel with the support of a bank loan. In 1974, he founded Costamare Shipping S.A. During the shipping crisis of 1982–1984, he acquired eight vessels at very low prices. Following the bankruptcy of Grigoris Callimanopulos’ liner shipping company Hellenic Lines, he recruited members of its experienced workforce and entered the liner shipping market by chartering vessels to companies already operating established routes.

Over the following 20 years, the company grew significantly and regularly renewed its fleet. In 2000, Costamare managed 35 vessels with a total carrying capacity of 1,560,000 dwt. By July 2026, it had developed into an international shipping company with a fleet of 93 containerships and a total capacity of approximately 673,000 TEU, including vessels under construction, acquisition or sale.

In the mid-1980s, he developed a vision of placing Messinia on the global tourism map, with the aim of promoting the region and strengthening local employment. He created Costa Navarino, an internationally recognised destination distinguished by its approach to environmental protection and its relationship with local communities. Captain Vassilis received numerous awards in Greece and abroad for his business and social contribution and was a founding member of several organisations and institutions.

== Environment & Social Contribution ==
From the early 1980s, Captain Vassilis played an active role in environmental protection initiatives. He served as Chairman of the Hellenic Marine Environment Protection Association HELMEPA and was a founding member and key supporter of HELMEPA Junior, the Association’s environmental education programme for children. HELMEPA Junior trains young people to act as the courier of environmental messages whilst also bringing the children closer to shipping and to show them potential future career options. Since 1993, more than 45,000 children aged 6 to 13 years old, and 1,800 teachers, have participated all over Greece. In 1998 HELMEPA Junior was awarded the UNEP (United Nations Environment Programme) Global 500 prize.

In 2009, TEMES, in collaboration with Stockholm University and the Academy of Athens, established the .Navarino Environmental Observatory (NEO) The initiative represented an innovative partnership between academia and the private sector, connecting scientific research with the practical application of environmental knowledge. The Observatory focuses on research and education concerning climate change and its effects on the natural environment and human activity in the Mediterranean region.

His business and social activities were closely connected with his birthplace, Messinia, where he supported initiatives promoting local development, employment and local production. His vision was for Messinia to become a model sustainable destination, creating employment and business opportunities for its residents, particularly younger generations. He also emphasised the connection between tourism development, environmental protection, the promotion of cultural heritage and support for local businesses and producers.

In 2011, the Captain Vassilis and Carmen Constantakopoulos Foundation was established. Its mission is to contribute to the creation of a sustainable development model in Messinia that could serve as an example for Greece and beyond, through the development of innovative initiatives in cooperation with local communities. <https://www.newmoney.gr/roh/palmos-oikonomias/nautilia/timithike-gia-tin-kinoniki-tou-prosfora-to-idrima-kapetan-vasili-ke-karmen-konstantakopoulou/>

Constantakopoulos served on the Boards of Directors of numerous Greek and international organizations in the maritime and other fields and received awards from the Academy of Athens, the European Union and several cities and chambers for his activities.

== Distinctions and Recognition ==
Constantakopoulos died on 25 January 2011, at the age of 76. In a 2004 feature, Lloyd’s List referred to Vassilis Constantakopoulos as the “Greek King of Containers”. By June 2007, Costamare’s fleet comprised 51 container vessels. In 2009, at an event held at the Athens Chamber of Commerce and Industry, seven Chambers of Commerce from the Peloponnese honoured Vassilis Constantakopoulos for his contribution to the development of Messinia and the wider Peloponnese. In 2012, Kalamata State Airport was renamed Kalamata State Airport “Captain Vassilis Constantakopoulos”, in recognition of his contribution to the development of Messinia and the enhancement of the region’s international connectivity.
