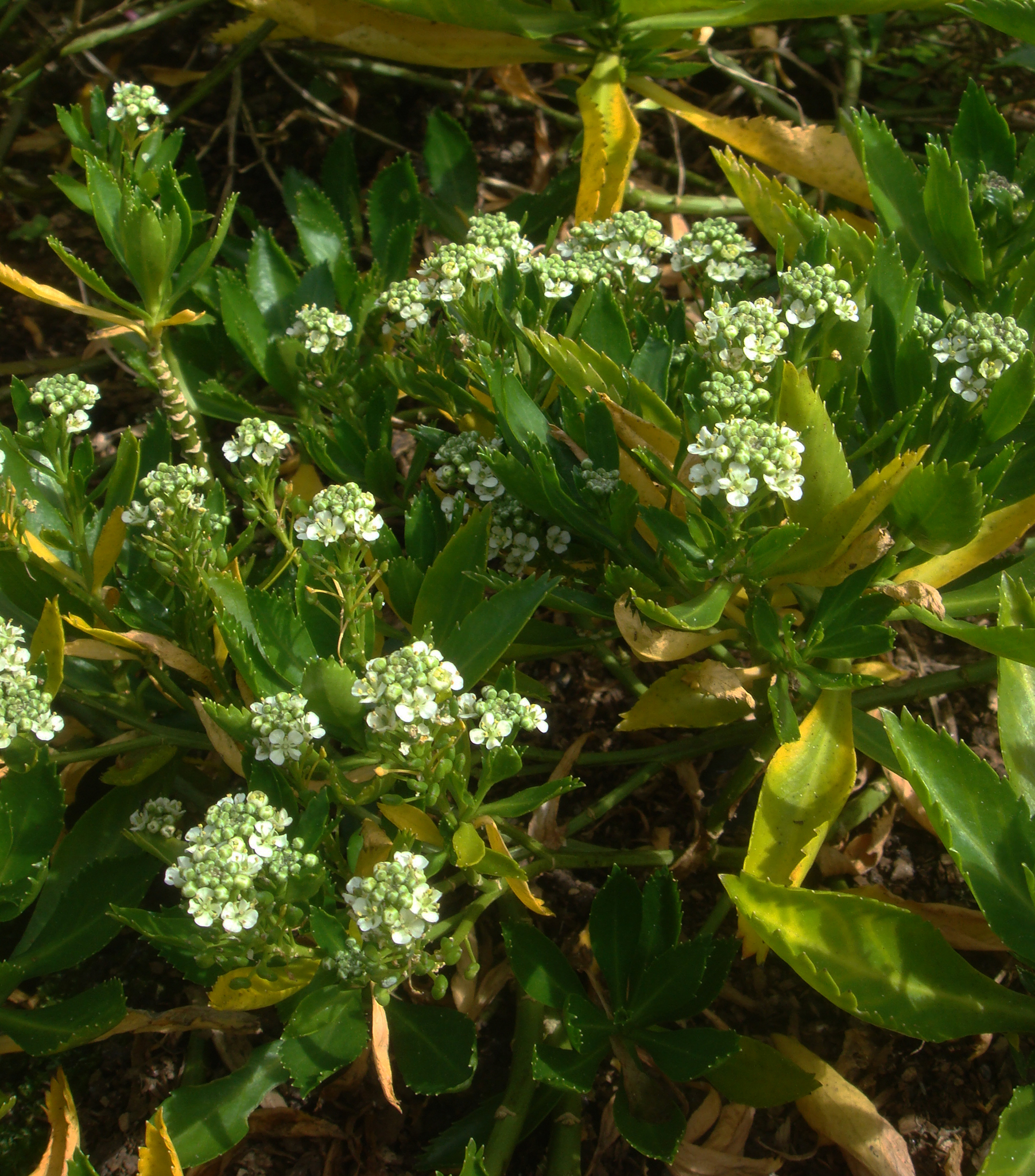

Conservation status
- Nationally Vulnerable (NZ TCS)

Scientific classification
- Kingdom: Plantae
- Clade: Tracheophytes
- Clade: Angiosperms
- Clade: Eudicots
- Clade: Rosids
- Order: Brassicales
- Family: Brassicaceae
- Genus: Lepidium
- Species: L. oleraceum

Binomial name
- Lepidium oleraceum G.Forst. ex Sparrm.

Synonyms
- Thlaspi oleraceum Poir.; Nasturtium oleraceum (Poir.) Kuntze

= Lepidium oleraceum =

Species of flowering plant

Lepidium oleraceum is a herb in the family Brassicaceae, endemic to New Zealand. Its English common name is Cook's scurvy grass; Māori names include nau, ngau, naunau and heketara.

Its specific epithet oleraceum means "vegetable/herbal" in Latin and is a form of holeraceus (oleraceus).

== Taxonomy ==
There are three recognised varieties:

- var. frondosum Kirk
- var. acutidentatum Kirk
- var. serrulatum Thell.

== Distribution ==
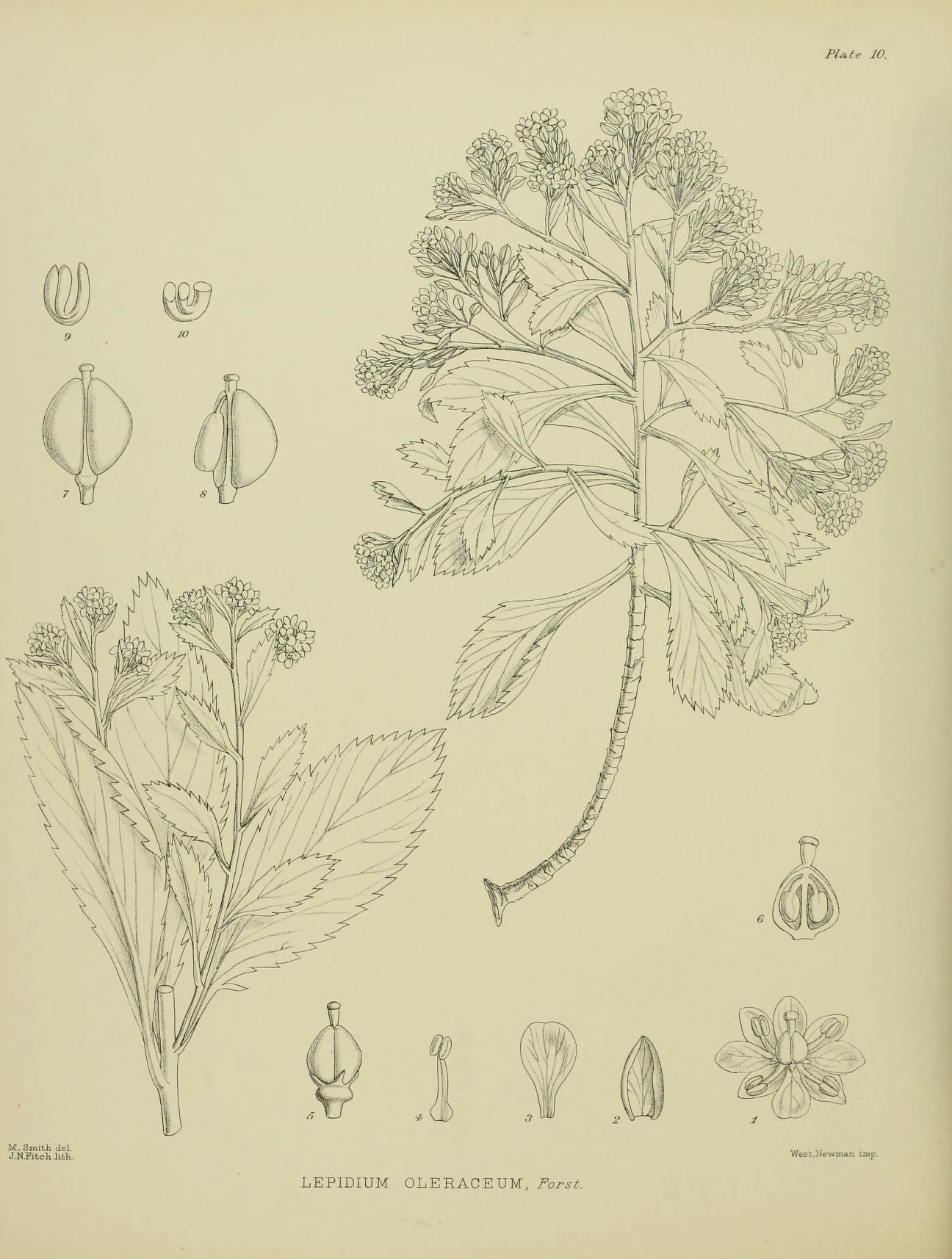
Illustration of L. oleraceum by Matilda Smith.

In New Zealand it is native to coastal areas of the North and South Islands, Stewart Island, the Three Kings Islands, the Snares Islands, the Chatham Islands, the Auckland Islands, the Antipodes Islands and the Bounty Islands. Although this species was once widespread, it is now mostly restricted to off-shore rock stacks and islets, such as Mana Island.

== Conservation status ==
The small populations are highly threatened, one of the reasons being reduced populations of seabirds which they are dependent on to provide highly fertile and disturbed soils associated with nesting grounds. Additionally the species is susceptible to browsing by livestock, rodents, snails, and insect herbivores such as aphids, leaf miners, the diamondback moth (Plutella xylostella), and the small cabbage white butterfly (Pieris rapae). It is also affected by white rust, a fungus-like disease caused by the oomycete Albugo candida.

== Connection with James Cook ==
During his voyages of exploration James Cook collected a number of plant species at various locations which were used to help ward off scurvy amongst his crew. While visiting Tolaga Bay in New Zealand on his first voyage, Cook noted in his journal on 27 October 1769: "the other place I landed at was the north point of the Bay where I got as much Sellery and Scurvy grass as loaded the Boat". Historian John Cawte Beaglehole believed that "scurvy grass" in this case referred to Lepidium oleraceum. Specimens of the plant were collected by botanists Johann and Georg Forster on Cook's second voyage.

== Uses ==
Young leaves may be eaten raw or cooked. They have a hot cress-like taste and are a rich source of vitamin C.
