= Mōtītī Island =

Island in the Bay of Plenty, New Zealand

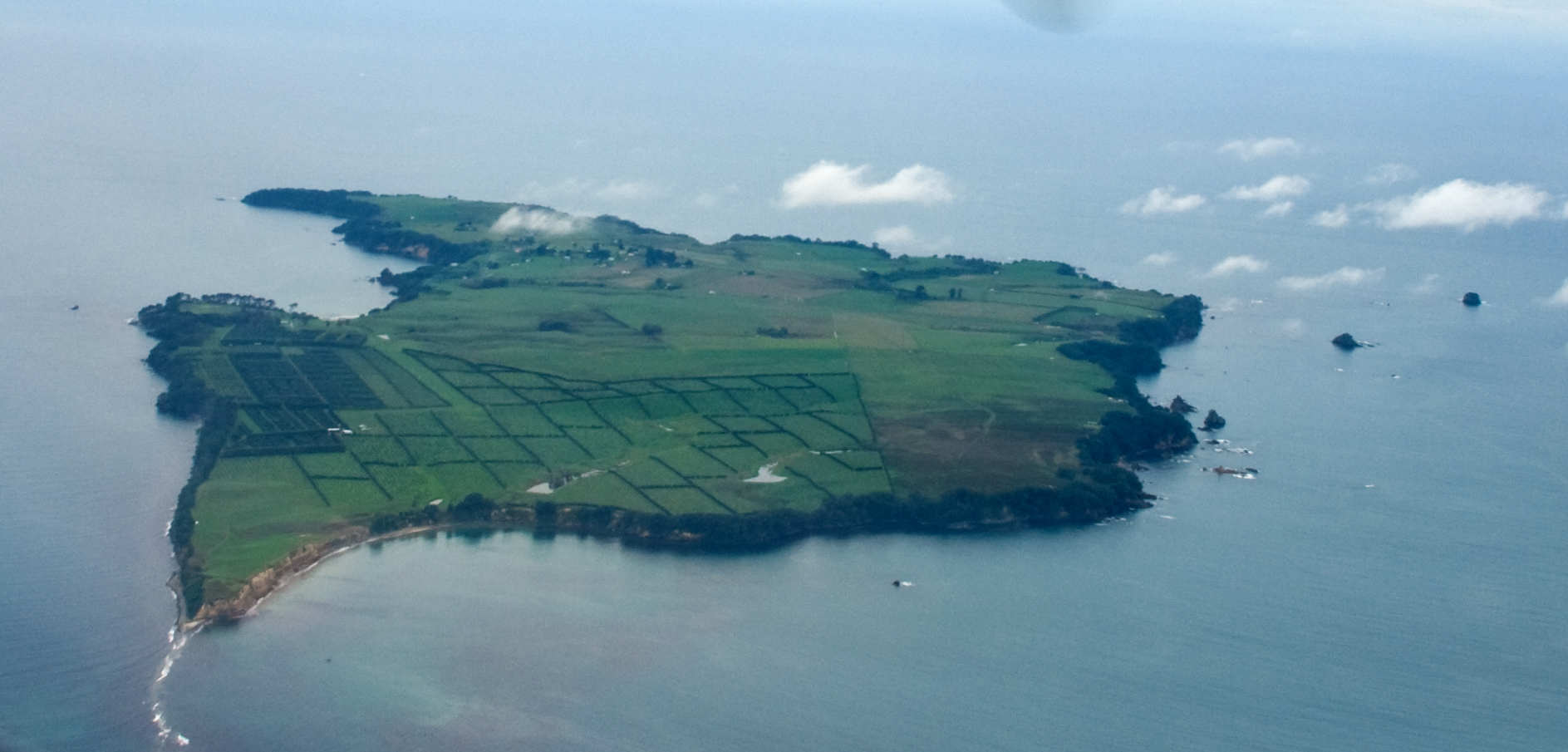
- Aerial view of Mōtītī Island

- Location within New Zealand

Geography
- Location: Bay of Plenty
- Coordinates: 37.6257°S 176.4221°E
- Total islands: 1
- Major islands: 1
- Area: 10 km^{2} (3.9 sq mi)
- Highest elevation: 57 m (187 ft)

Administration
- New Zealand

Demographics
- Population: 27 (2006)
- Pop. density: 2.7/km^{2} (7/sq mi)
- Ethnic groups: Māori

Mōtītī Island is an island in the Bay of Plenty, off the coast of New Zealand's North Island. It is 11 kilometres (6.8 mi) north-east of Papamoa Beach on the mainland and 22 kilometres (14 mi) north-east of Tauranga. There were 18 homes occupied by 27 people on the island in the 2006 census.

== Geography ==
Mōtītī Island surface volcanics map with the predominant basaltic andesite coloured orange-red. Clicking on the map enlarges it, and enables panning and mouseover of nearby volcanic feature name/wikilink and ages before present. The key to the other volcanics that are shown with panning is basalt - brown, monogenic basalts - dark brown, undifferentiated basalts of the Tangihua Complex in Northland Allochthon - light brown, arc basalts - deep orange brown, arc ring basalts -orange brown, andesite - red, dacite - purple, rhyolite - violet, ignimbrite (lighter shades of violet), and plutonic - gray.

A relatively flat island covering some 10 km^{2} (3.9 sq mi), Mōtītī Island is composed mainly of Miocene andesitic basalt volcanic rocks, overlaid with more recent sediments in the south. The principal activity on the island is agriculture, with a developing avocado plantation. Most residents and visitors travel to the island by air.

There is no public infrastructure (e.g. no public wharf) and the whole island is in private ownership. Access is difficult and expensive. Bay of Plenty Regional Council has regional council responsibility for Mōtītī Island. No territorial authority council is responsible for it – therefore residents pay no rates and there are no council services. Day-to-day administration is by the Department of Internal Affairs.

== History and culture ==
=== Pre-colonial history ===
On 2 November 1769, during his first voyage, Captain Cook sailed close inshore to Mōtītī Island, where he reported the most extensive complex of fortified villages he had yet seen. In his journal he refers to it as the "Flat Island".

=== Recent history ===
On 5 October 2011 the container ship MV Rena ran aground on Astrolabe Reef, seven kilometers north of Mōtītī Island. Oil from the resulting spill, as well as shipping containers and their contents, reached the shore of the island. In October 2013, Mōtītī Island residents rejected an offer by the MV Rena's owners to start a development project for the island, in return for being able to leave the Rena wreckage where it lay. The plan included:

- Building a landing point for barges
- Creating a one-lane, all-weather road to the airstrip
- Installing a new mobile phone tower to improve communications
- Running an underground cable from the mainland to improve power supply
- Putting a permanent beacon on Astrolabe Reef
- Building a Rena memorial from the ship's anchor

On 9 October 2011, the 45-foot launch M/V Excalibur ran aground on Mōtītī Island in bad weather. The crew of six was rescued, but the boat was considered a total loss.

=== Marae ===
The island has two marae, belonging to the Ngāti Awa hapū of Te Patuwai and Ngāti Maumoana: Te Hinga o te Ra or Te Karioi Marae and Te Hinga o te Ra meeting house; and Te Rua Kopiha Marae and Tamatea ki te Huatahi meeting house.

In October 2020, the Government committed $4,871,246 from the Provincial Growth Fund to upgrade a group of 12 marae, including Te Rua Kopiha Marae. The funding was expected to create 23 jobs.

== Aerodrome ==
Island Air Charters operates to Mōtītī Island from Tauranga and back with 1 Cessna 206 and 2 Cessna 172 aircraft. In addition, Sunair operates to Mōtītī Island from Tauranga and back with 3 Cessna 172 aircraft, and the Tauranga Aero Club operates to Mōtītī Island from Tauranga and back with 3 Cessna 172 aircraft.

== See also ==
- List of islands of New Zealand
