= Pukehina =

Town in the Bay of Plenty, New Zealand

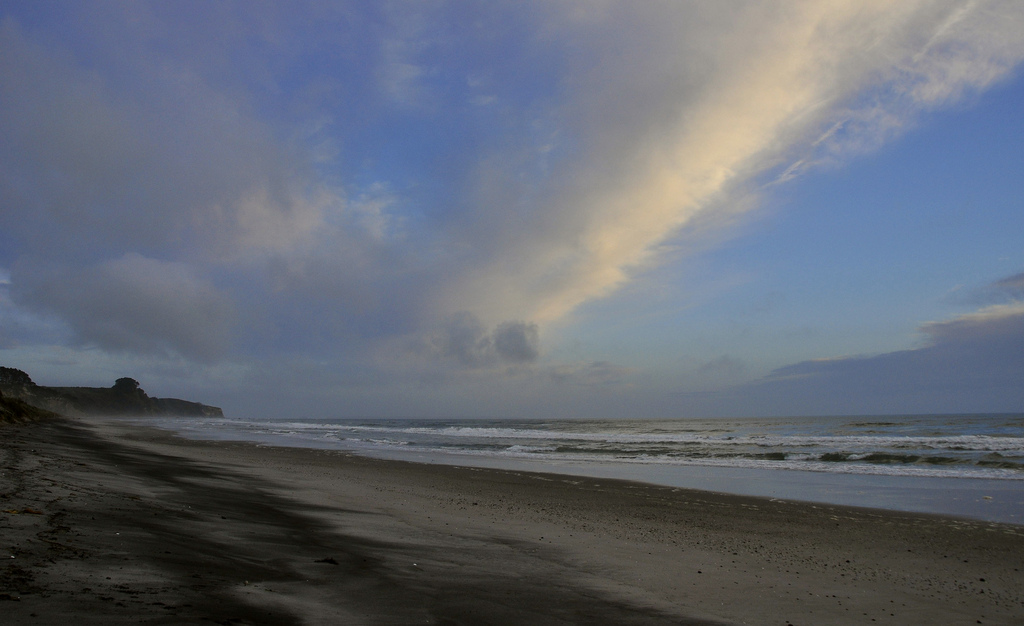
- Pukehina Beach
- Interactive map of Pukehina
- Coordinates: 37°48′S 176°31′E
- Country: New Zealand
- Region: Bay of Plenty
- Territorial authority: Western Bay of Plenty
- Ward: Maketu-Te Puke
- Community: Maketu Community
- Electorates: East Cape; Waiariki (Māori)

Government
  - Territorial authority: Western Bay of Plenty District Council
  - Regional council: Bay of Plenty Regional Council
  - Mayor of Western Bay of Plenty: James Denyer
  - East Cape MP: Dana Kirkpatrick
  - Waiariki MP: Rawiri Waititi

Area
  - Total: 1.57 km^{2} (0.61 sq mi)

Population (June 2025)
  - Total: 940
  - Density: 600/km^{2} (1,600/sq mi)
- Postcode(s): 3189

Pukehina is a beach and township located in the Western Bay of Plenty District and Bay of Plenty Region of New Zealand's North Island. It consists of a white sandy beach, an estuary, farms and several homes. The area is popular with surfing, windsurfing and kite surfing. There is a campground located at the south-eastern end of the beach, and a boat ramp at the estuary.

The beach is dangerous for inexperienced surfers and swimmers due to the strong currents that are often present and steep banks at many places along the six kilometre beach. Offshore winds blow from the south-west, which are quite common since the prevailing wind in New Zealand is westerly. The area also enjoys more sunshine hours than other places in the country.

Both sharks and seals have been sighted at the beach. Several dead seals washed up on the beach in August 2019.

== Demographics ==
Pukehina Beach statistical area, which corresponds to Pukehina, covers 1.57 km^{2} (0.61 sq mi) and had an estimated population of 940 as of June 2025, with a population density of 599 people per km^{2}.

Historical population
Year	Pop.	±% p.a.
2006	960	—
2013	615	−6.16%
2018	804	+5.51%
2023	885	+1.94%

Pukehina Beach had a population of 885 in the 2023 New Zealand census, an increase of 81 people (10.1%) since the 2018 census, and an increase of 270 people (43.9%) since the 2013 census. There were 471 males, 414 females, and 3 people of other genders in 339 dwellings. 1.7% of people identified as LGBTIQ+. The median age was 50.1 years (compared with 38.1 years nationally). There were 144 people (16.3%) aged under 15 years, 90 (10.2%) aged 15 to 29, 459 (51.9%) aged 30 to 64, and 195 (22.0%) aged 65 or older.

People could identify as more than one ethnicity. The results were 83.1% European (Pākehā); 23.1% Māori; 2.0% Pasifika; 3.7% Asian; 1.7% Middle Eastern, Latin American and African New Zealanders (MELAA); and 2.7% other, which includes people giving their ethnicity as "New Zealander". English was spoken by 96.6%, Māori by 5.4%, Samoan by 0.3%, and other languages by 7.5%. No language could be spoken by 2.0% (e.g. too young to talk). The percentage of people born overseas was 16.6, compared with 28.8% nationally.

Religious affiliations were 27.8% Christian, 0.3% Hindu, 0.7% Islam, 1.4% Māori religious beliefs, 0.3% Buddhist, 1.7% New Age, 0.3% Jewish, and 0.7% other religions. People who answered that they had no religion were 59.7%, and 7.8% of people did not answer the census question.

Of those at least 15 years old, 150 (20.2%) people had a bachelor's or higher degree, 414 (55.9%) had a post-high school certificate or diploma, and 177 (23.9%) people exclusively held high school qualifications. The median income was $40,900, compared with $41,500 nationally. 93 people (12.6%) earned over $100,000 compared to 12.1% nationally. The employment status of those at least 15 was 378 (51.0%) full-time, 117 (15.8%) part-time, and 15 (2.0%) unemployed.

== Geography ==
Pukehina Beach is located twenty minutes drive away from Te Puke, the Kiwifruit capital of New Zealand. On the other side of the estuary is Little Waihi and it is a short drive from there to Maketu.

To the north-west, across the estuary entrance and around the point is Newdicks Beach. To the east-north-east, out to sea, lies Whakaari / White Island, an active volcano and peak of a 1,600m submarine mountain, which is visible during fine weather.

To the south-east there is an extensive area of Māori land anchored by the Otamarakau marae.

== History ==
In 2017, Pukekina experienced exponential house price growth, due to demand for holiday homes from New Zealand, Australia, China and the United States.

A suspected drink driver crashed into a beachside home in Pukekina in November 2018, but no one was killed or injured in the crash.

The Pukehina Volunteer Fire Brigade was sued in early 2018 by a former volunteer fireman who claimed the brigade had a culture of bullying.

In 2018, developers applied for planning approval to convert a 165-hectare dairy farm into a sustainable eco-friendly lifestyle village, and a restored wetland for birds like the critically endangered Matuku.

In August 2018, State Highway 2 was blocked at Pukehina by a roaming herd of up to 80 cows.

Pukehina Surf Club received planning approval in late 2018 to replace its ageing club house and shipping container with a new $2.4 million purpose-built building.

== Education ==
Pukehina School is a co-educational state primary school for Year 1 to 8 students, with a roll of 13 as of July 2026. The school opened in 1914.
