= Astrolabe Reef =

Reef off the Bay of Plenty coast in New Zealand

Coordinates: 37.56039°S 176.396466°E

Location of Astrolabe Reef

Astrolabe Reef is near Mōtītī Island, 20 kilometres NE of Tauranga, off the Bay of Plenty coast in New Zealand. The reef, which breaks the water surface at low tide, is a renowned scuba diving spot that drops off to 37 metres (121 ft) in different parts. The reef was named by Jules Dumont d'Urville after his ship Astrolabe, when it nearly ran aground there on 16 February 1827.

== Grounding of Rena ==
On Wednesday, 5 October 2011, the container ship MV Rena ran aground on the reef. By Sunday, 9 October, a 5-kilometre (3.1 mi) oil-slick threatened wildlife and the area's rich fishing waters. By 13 October the ship had started to list and rock in the waves. Over 88 containers, some containing dangerous chemicals, fell into the sea and some washed ashore. The wreck broke in two during stormy weather on 7 January 2012.

An exclusion zone was placed around the wreck during salvage and recovery operations, and this lasted until April 2016, when the reef was re-opened to vessels under 500 tonnes (550 short tons). The reef and the unsalvaged remains of the Rena have now become a popular dive site.

== See also ==
- Lists of shipwrecks
