= Rena oil spill =

Oil spill in New Zealand in October 2011

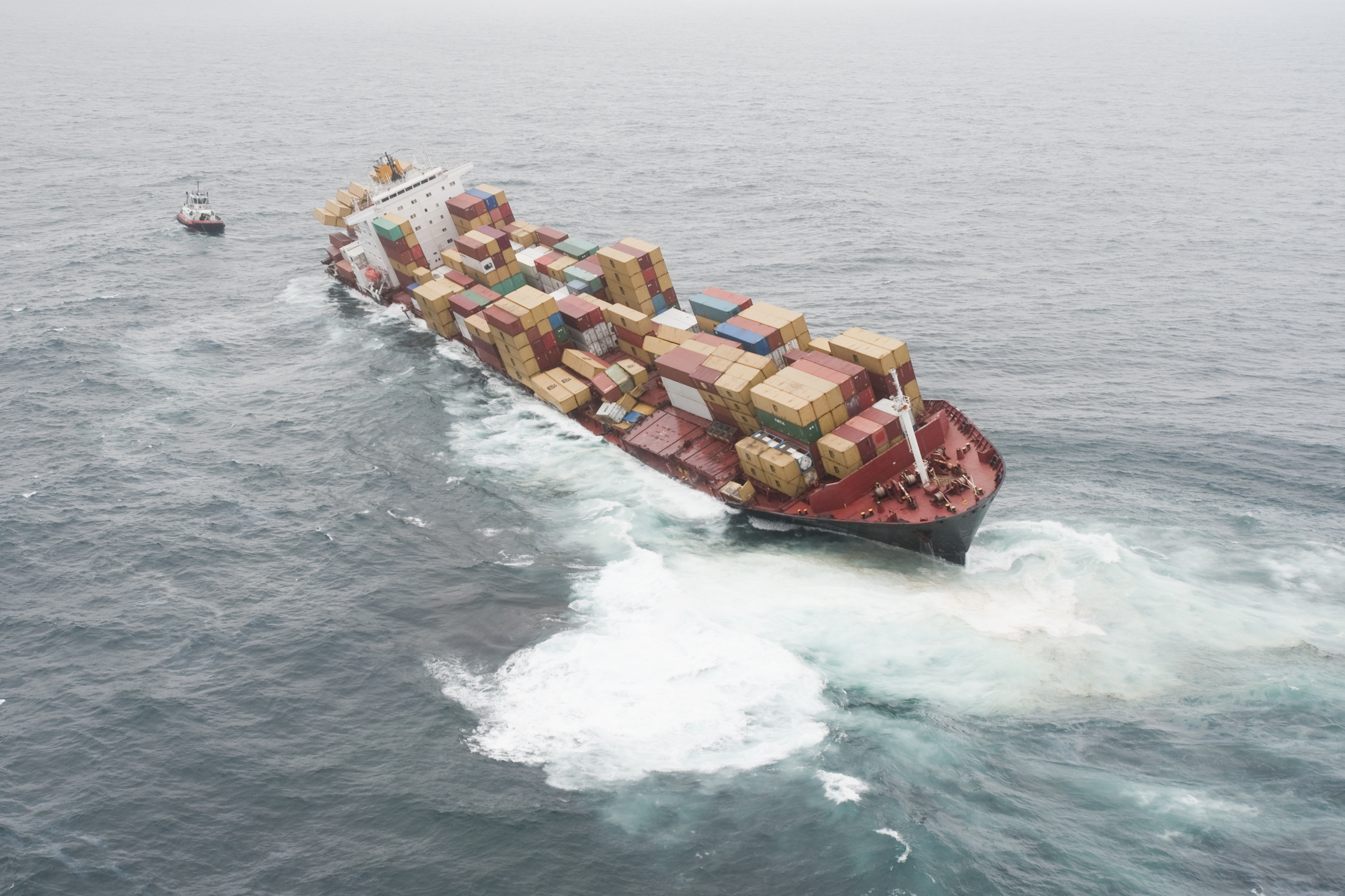
- Rena aground on Astrolabe Reef
- Interactive map of Rena oil spill
- Location: Tauranga, New Zealand
- Coordinates: 37.56039°S 176.396466°E
- Date: 5 October 2011

Cause
- Cause: Ship grounding

Spill characteristics
- Volume: Up to 2,500 barrels (400 m^{3})

Location of Astrolabe Reef in New Zealand

The Rena oil spill occurred off the coast of Tauranga, New Zealand in October 2011. The spill was caused by the grounding of MV Rena on the Astrolabe Reef. The Rena was a container ship and cargo vessel owned by the Greek shipping company Costamare Inc., through one of its subsidiary companies Daina Shipping. The spill has been described as New Zealand's worst maritime environmental disaster.

== Sequence of events ==
On Wednesday, 5 October 2011, at 2:20 AM (Tuesday, 4 October 13:20 UTC) while sailing in clear weather from Napier to Tauranga, at a speed of 17 knots (31 km/h; 20 mph), Rena ran aground on Astrolabe Reef. The ship was carrying 1,368 containers, eight of which contained hazardous materials, as well as 1,700 tonnes of heavy fuel oil and 200 tonnes of marine diesel oil. Initially the ship listed 11 degrees to port, with the front stuck on the reef.

By 9 October, an oil slick 5 kilometres (3.1 mi) long threatened wildlife and the area's rich fishing waters. Oil from Rena began washing ashore at Mount Maunganui beach on 10 October. Bad weather that night had caused the ship to shift further onto the reef, and the crew was evacuated. The shifting of the ship caused further damage, resulting in a further 130–350 tonnes of oil leaking.

Strong winds and bad weather on the night of 11 October caused the ship to list over to starboard 19 degrees; this resulted in between 30 and 70 containers being washed overboard. None of these containers contained hazardous cargo. Containers subsequently began washing ashore on Mōtītī Island. On the afternoon of 12 October, aerial footage showed a large crack in the hull, increasing fears that the ship could break in two and sink. It also showed a container floating in the water surrounded by smoke, suggesting that a chemical reaction was occurring.

On 13 October, Maritime New Zealand ordered beaches from Mount Maunganui to Maketu Point, including the Maketu Estuary, to be closed to the public. Volunteers were warned that contact with spilled oil could lead to vomiting, nausea and rashes, and local residents were urged to close their windows to limit fumes.

Costamare Shipping, the owners of Rena, apologised to the people of Tauranga, saying they were "deeply sorry" for the "disastrous event." Although not legally obligated to do so, the charterer, Mediterranean Shipping Company, promised to help with the cleanup costs.

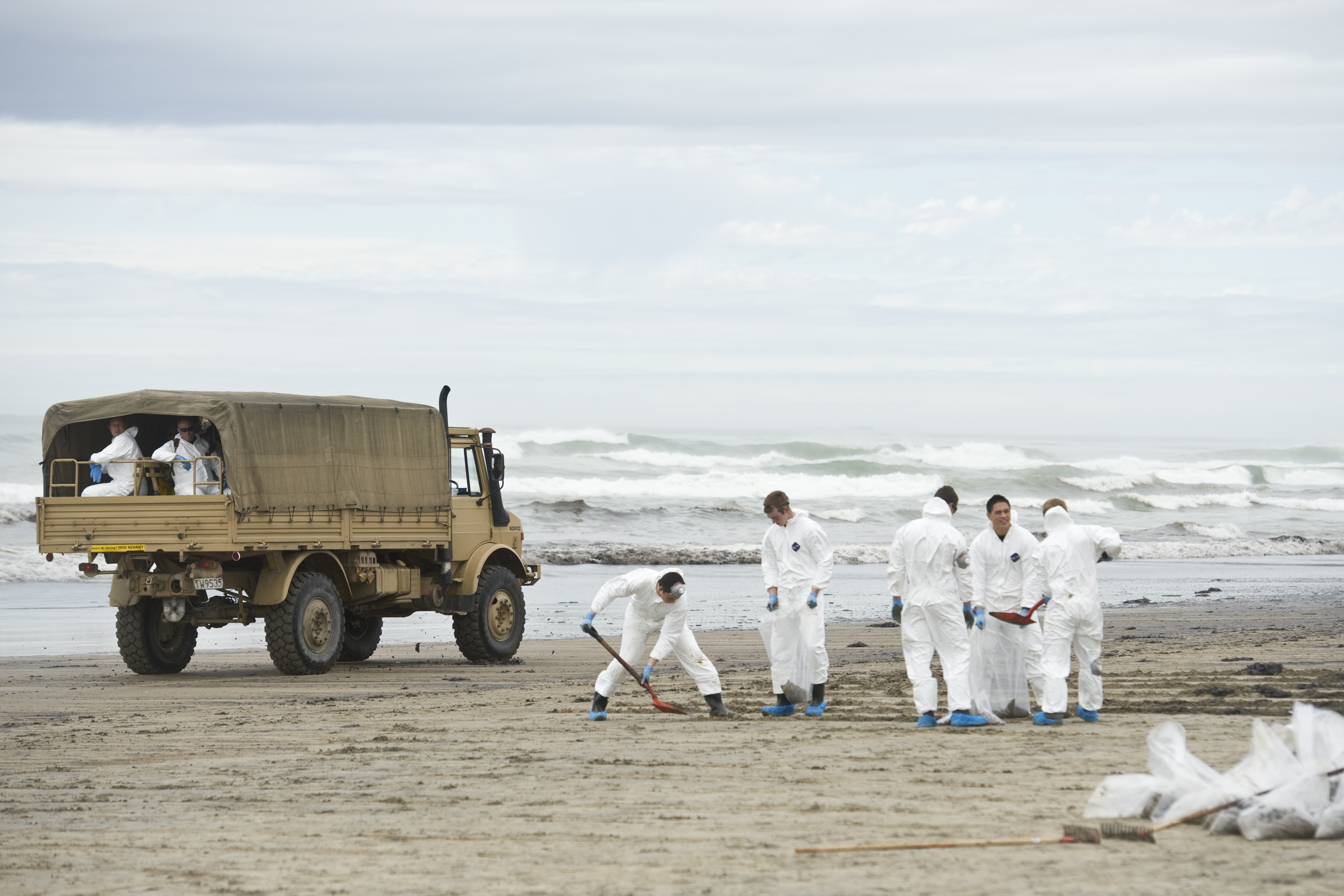
New Zealand Army personnel cleaning oil from Papamoa Beach on 11 October

On 14 October, it was reported that the ship's hull had cracked in half, and the bow and stern sections were held together only by internal structures and the reef. Calmer weather meant that preparations could be made to pump out the remainder of the ship's oil, but a change in the wind direction meant that oil was likely to spread as far east as Whakatāne and Ōpōtiki. The same day the Filipino crew of the Rena left New Zealand "for their safety" after a racist backlash against Filipinos in Tauranga.

Calm weather on 15 October allowed salvage experts to board the vessel and begin preparations to pump the remaining oil to a barge. Platforms were attached to the side of the ship, and pumping began on 16 October. By 17 October only twenty tons of oil had been removed. On 16 October a mine-countermeasures team aboard HMNZS Manawanui began hunting for spilled containers.

After October, salvage efforts were focused on removing the ship's cargo before it completely broke apart. In January 2012, the Rena completely broke in half and the stern section slipped off of the reef and eventually sank. A small amount of oil and containers escaped the ship as it broke in half. By 23 March 2012, 649 containers of cargo had been recovered and it was thought that only a few tens of tonnes of oil still remained in the ship.

== Media coverage and public reactions ==
The incident was not immediately brought to the public eye since it took place on the same day that well-known American businessman Steve Jobs died. In addition, media outlets had their hands full with the Occupy Wall Street Movement that was taking place. Information about the oil spill did not surface on major news websites until four days later when CBC News published an article on 9 October 2011. British newspaper The Guardian then released a piece on the incident on 10 October 2011, followed by the BBC on 11 October 2011.

Residents of Motiti Island voiced their concerns over the effects the oil spill was having on their lives, since they relied on water filled in tanks and seafood from the affected waters for survival. It cost islanders approximately $100 to leave the island for food or water; this expense along with the toxic water and seafood raised concern among the citizens of Motiti Island that their lives might never be the same.

New Zealand environmental minister, Nick Smith, said that the impact of this spill was the most significant in New Zealand history. Reporter Karen Barlow of Lateline said that it may not be the biggest ever oil spill, but it could be catastrophic for the pristine waters of the Bay of Plenty. World Wildlife Fund spokesperson, Bob Zuur, confirmed a major loss of wildlife.

== Cleanup ==
"The cleanup for the Rena Oil spill will take time," said New Zealand scientist Dr. Norm Duke. "Petroleum oil will naturally break down - but this takes time and oxygenation. So, the longer the oil remains floating at sea - the safer it becomes. And, the rougher the weather - the better also."

Maritime New Zealand used the oil dispersant Corexit 9500 to help in the cleanup process. Corexit is known to increase the toxicity of oil. The dispersant was applied for only a week, after results proved inconclusive.

Rena ship owners Daina Shipping, a subsidiary of Costamare, was reported to have spent NZD235 million on the salvage and cleanup operations. Lloyds reported that the insurance costs for removal of the wreck were US$240 million.

In December 2020, divers discovered that nature is in the process of recovering and the wreck is becoming a thriving kelp forest. Divers keep monitoring for any pieces of steel that might become dislodged and float in the tide to damage the reef, as well as the status of 5 to 10 tonnes of granulated copper trapped underneath the wreck’s hull. The team will keep monitoring the MV Rena for the next 20 years to check it causes no further damage to the reef and any issues are identified early.

== Salvage teams ==
- In 2011, there were approximately 400 trained responders to oil spills in the country. Marine Pollution Response Service advised that most of the responders had received low level training, estimating that only 60 of the 400 trained have achieved high level training. The Marine Pollution Response Service suggested that a higher level of training was required in various levels of response training. Also, there was a report of insufficient development in the information and training given to this team.
- A salvage company named Svitzer was hired to assess the safety of contracted salvage teams on the ship and to continue to carry out salvage procedures. Matthew Watson, a spokesman for Svitzer, described the key tasks carried out by the salvage teams to be removal of oil off of the ship (specifically through a transferring process) and the collection of released containers and other waste. Salvage teams were helicoptered onto the ship, as that was advised as the safest way.

== Environmental impact ==
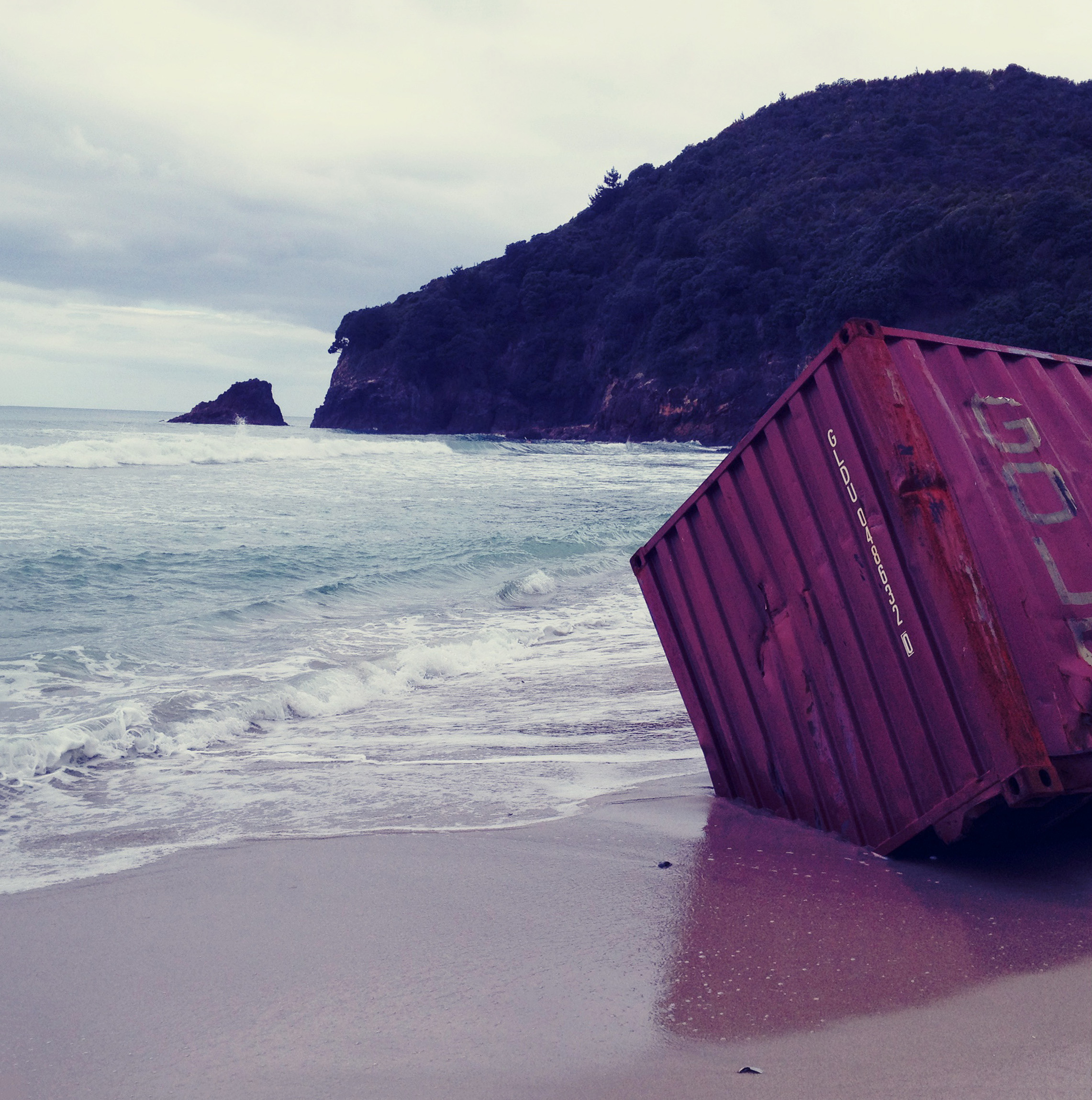
A shipping container from the Rena beached at Orokawa Bay in January 2012

- The fuel on board the Rena consisted of 1,700 tonnes of heavy oil and 200 tonnes of diesel fuel. It was thought that in the Bay of Plenty over a thousand tonnes of sand would need to be removed in order to get the oil out.
- Within the range of where the oil spilled the rare New Zealand spotted dotterel bird and 25 other native birds species inhabit. Attempts by local people and 36 wildlife teams/centres to help save or decontaminate the avian species were established. Conayne from the Wildlife Rescue Center explains that a handful of fur seals had been captured to keep them out of the oil from the Rena. In another attempt to save the animals, people knitted jumpers and sweaters for little blue penguins to wear. These were designed to prevent the penguins from becoming cold and prevent them ingesting oil while preening. One group of 49 little penguins was successfully released back into the wild in late November 2011.
- Over the duration of the event, 383 oiled little blue penguins were admitted to the oiled wildlife facility. 95% of these (365 penguins) were released back to the wild with 18 admitted birds dying (thirteen required euthanasia and another five died in care). 89 dead oiled penguins were recovered through the response. Just over one quarter of these birds suffered 90-100% oiling. The rehabilitation of penguins was determined to be a successful and worthwhile exercise.
- The tragedy caused about 2,000 seabirds deaths. An estimate of 20,000 birds are thought to be victims of the oil spill through their ecosystem and food sources being contaminated. One outcome that is not yet determined is the effect on the ocean's ecosystems in the area of where the Rena spilled the oil. WWF Rob Zuur explains "it would take years to know the full impact of the oil spill on the Bay of Plenty’s ecosystem, which also contains huge marine kelp forests and is home to a large fishing industry". "Filter-feeding whales are at risk from sticky oil clinging to their baleen plates as they feed" said Al Fleming, Tauranga-based Central North Island field officer of New Zealand. According to Fleming, the oil's effect on finfish, shellfish, crustaceans and other marine life could be disastrous. In addition, the oil will affect birds and marine mammals by ingestion, and bio-accumulation whereby the toxicity of the oil can be responsible for long or short term effects.
- Blobs of heavy oil washed up on the beach shores of Mount Maunganui and Papamoa, and were expected to continue to wash up in other parts of New Zealand. The beaches affected were closed until cleanup crews arrived, and locals were instructed to keep a distance from the shore and the oil clusters.

== Political consequences ==
The disaster occurred only seven weeks prior to the 2011 general election (which took place on 26 November 2011) and partially affected the campaign. On 14 October it was reported that the disaster had caused a 4% drop in the governing National Party's polling on the iPredict prediction market.

On 13 October 2011, the New Zealand Labour Party announced that it would impose a moratorium on deep sea drilling for oil if elected to power.

In 2012 the government announced a twelve-month environmental recovery plan for the area with an expected cost of NZ$2–3 million (US$1.6M–2.5M as of January 2012).

== Criminal charges ==
On 12 October 2011, the captain of Rena appeared in the Tauranga District Court charged with operating a vessel causing unnecessary danger or risk to a person or property. He was granted name suppression and remanded on bail. If convicted he faced a fine of up to $10,000 or up to 12 months imprisonment. The ship's second officer, who was responsible for navigation at the time of the accident, was subsequently charged and appeared in court on 13 October.

The two men, both Filipino, pleaded guilty to 11 charges between them, including attempting to pervert the course of justice (based on alleged alteration of navigational documents after the collision). The sentencing for both men was scheduled for 25 May 2012.

The (New Zealand) Transport Accident Investigation Commission released an interim report into the grounding on 8 March 2012. The report states only what happened but not why, and does not apportion blame. It states that Rena arrived at the port of Napier and began unloading cargo, but was forced to stand off in the harbour when a ship with priority booking arrived. Rena was therefore delayed 13 hours in leaving Napier. On making the run toward Tauranga, the captain was under pressure to make up time and to arrive at the port's pilot station by 3:00 am, and the ship's charts showed that a more direct course than usual had been set that took Rena toward Astrolabe Reef. An intermittent radar echo first noticed at 2:05 am was ignored when nothing was seen through binoculars, and at 2:14 Rena struck the reef.

On 25 May 2012, the captain and navigation officer appeared in Tauranga District Court for sentencing. Each was sentenced to 7 months imprisonment after being found guilty under the Maritime Transport Act for operating a vessel in a manner likely to cause danger, under the Resource Management Act (RMA) for discharging a contaminant and three charges under the Crimes Act for willfully attempting to alter the course of justice by altering ship's documents after the grounding. They also had their name suppression lifted and were revealed as Captain Mauro Balomaga and Navigation Officer Leonil Relon.

The Rena had no chartplotter, a very commonplace device on all vessels in 2011; costing as little as $2,000 it would have immediately shown the crew of their disastrous course and the imminent danger.

The reef was not marked with a light, only Motiti Island over 7 km away. In the final report the Transport Accident Investigation Commission established that a light on the reef would probably have prevented the disaster but Maritime New Zealand were unsure of the cost/benefit of a light, stating that lights cost money to maintain, and were looking into AIS warnings instead. Nevertheless, marine charts show that a buoy and light have now been installed on the reef now to mark the 2 nautical mile exclusion zone for vessels over 500 tonnage.

Part of the cargo on the ship was a shipment of 4,000 cases of wine from Marlborough winery Astrolabe Wines, also named after the same explorer's ship that gave its name to the reef.

== Treaty of Waitangi case ==
Three Bay of Plenty iwi groups have launched a breach of the Treaty of Waitangi case against the Crown. Their key concern is that they were not adequately consulted in regard to the Crown agreeing to receive $10 million as compensation for the remains of the wreck not being removed. The government agreed to the compensation payment when a storm caused the remains of the wreck to fall off the reef onto the seabed and marine demolition experts said it was too dangerous to remove it.

== Past spills ==
The second most extreme oil spill New Zealand has experienced since 1990 was the Jody F. Millennium log ship incident. The ship broke free from several of her moorings in Gisborne Harbour due to huge swells on Wednesday 6 February 2002. Tugboats attempted to bring the ship alongside the wharf, but it was then decided to take the ship to sea. A big swell hit the ship which then grounded on the beach. An estimated 25 tonnes of fuel oil leaked out of the ship.

== See also ==
- List of oil spills
- Environment of New Zealand
- Automated Data Inquiry for Oil Spills
- Environmental issues with petroleum
- Environmental issues with shipping
- National Oil and Hazardous Substances Pollution Contingency Plan
- Ohmsett (Oil and Hazardous Materials Simulated Environmental Test Tank)
