= MV Rena =

Ship built in 1990

Coordinates: 37°32′25″S 176°25′45″E

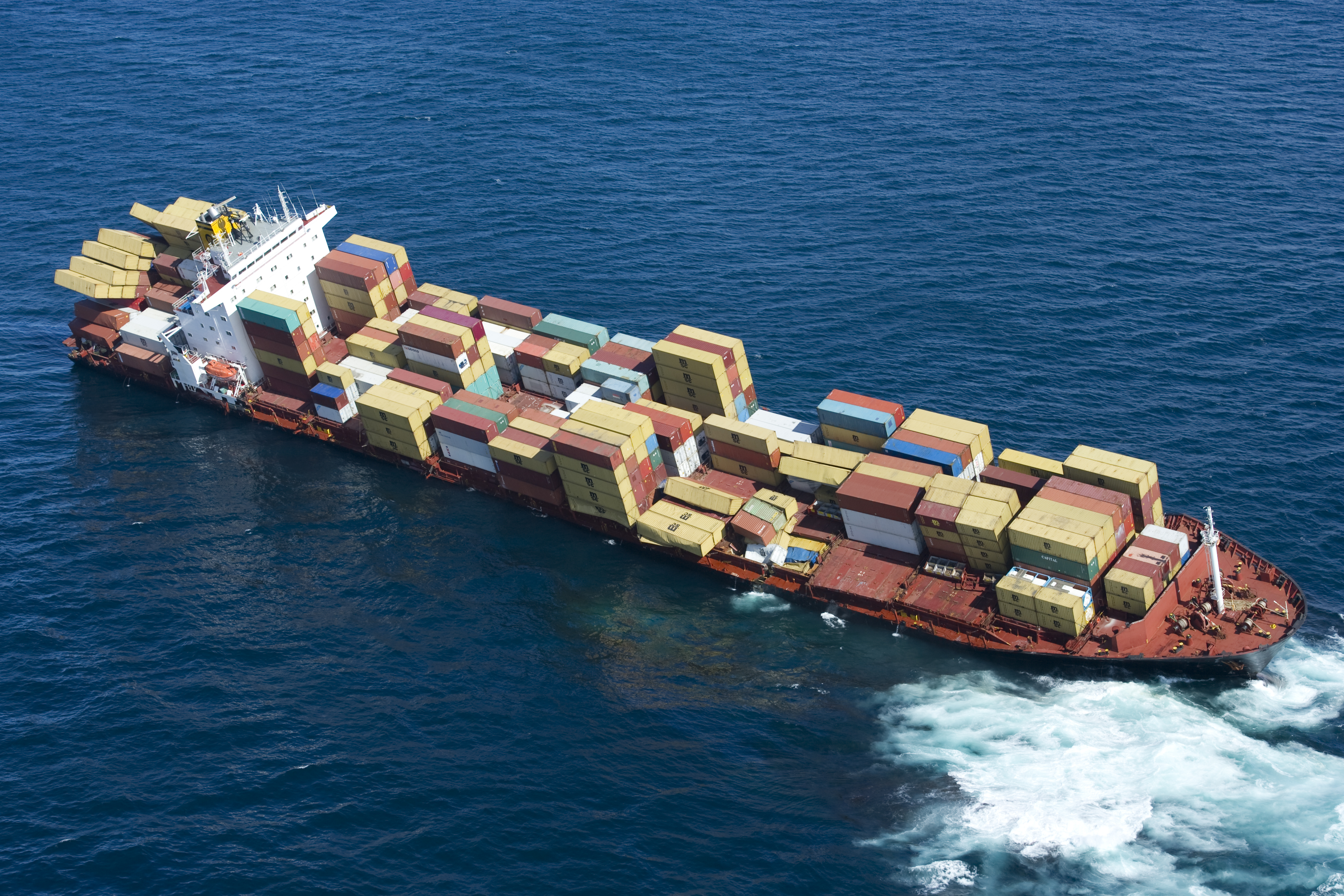
- MV Rena aground on the Astrolabe reef

History
- Name: ZIM America (1990–2007); Andaman Sea (2007–2010); Rena (2010–2011)
- Owner: Zim (1989–2010); Daina Shipping Co. (since 2010)
- Operator: Zim (1989–2010); Daina Shipping Co. (Costamare) (since 2010)
- Port of registry: Haifa, Israel (1990–2004); Valletta, Malta (2004–10); Monrovia, Liberia (since 2010)
- Builder: Howaldtswerke-Deutsche Werft AG, Kiel, Germany
- Yard number: 247
- Laid down: 4 October 1989
- Launched: 22 January 1990
- Completed: 1 April 1990
- Maiden voyage: 1990
- In service: 1990
- Out of service: 5 October 2011
- Identification: ABS class no: 9001562; Call sign: A8XJ7; IMO number: 8806802; MMSI no.: 636014911
- Fate: Broke in two after grounding on Astrolabe Reef, New Zealand, on 5 October 2011

General characteristics
- Type: Container ship
- Tonnage: 38,788 GT; 16,454 NT; 47,231 DWT
- Length: 236 m (774 ft)
- Beam: 32.2 m (106 ft)
- Draught: 12 m (39 ft) (max)
- Depth: 18.8 m (62 ft)
- Installed power: Cegielski-Sulzer 8RTA76 (21,996 kW)
- Propulsion: Fixed pitch propeller; Bow thruster
- Speed: 21 knots (39 km/h; 24 mph)
- Capacity: 3,351 TEU
- Crew: 20

MV Rena was a 3,351 TEU container ship owned by the Greek shipping company Costamare Inc. through one of its subsidiaries, Daina Shipping Co. The ship was built in 1990 as ZIM America for the Israeli shipping company Zim by Howaldtswerke-Deutsche Werft AG in Kiel, Germany. She was renamed Andaman Sea in 2007 and had sailed under her current name and owner since 2010.

On 5 October 2011, due to navigation errors near the Astrolabe Reef, the Rena ran aground near Tauranga, New Zealand, resulting in an oil spill. Over the span of several months, she had been battered by consistent heavy winds and rough seas and on 8 January 2012 the Rena broke in two after a particularly harsh night of bad weather. By 10 January the stern section had slipped off of the reef bank and sunk almost completely.

== Description ==
The Rena was a 236-metre (774 ft) Panamax container ship with a container capacity of 3,351 twenty-foot equivalent units (TEU) in seven holds. Her breadth was 32.2 metres (106 ft), and fully laden she had a draught of 12 metres (39 ft). Her gross tonnage was 38,788, net tonnage 16,454 and deadweight tonnage 47,231 tonnes. The Rena was served by a crew of 20.

The ship was propelled by a single eight-cylinder Cegielski-Sulzer 8RTA76 two-stroke low-speed diesel engine directly coupled to a fixed-pitch propeller. The main engine, which had a maximum output of 21,996 kW (29,497 hp) at 98 rpm, burned 90 tons of heavy fuel oil per day while giving the ship a service speed of 21 knots (39 km/h; 24 mph). For maneuvering at ports the ship was also equipped with a bow thruster. Shipboard power was generated by two 1,240-kilowatt (1,660 hp) auxiliary generating sets.

== History ==
=== Career ===
In the late 1980s the Israeli shipping company Zim launched a major renovation and fleet expansion project, which included ordering 15 new ships. One of the new ships was ZIM America, which was laid down on 4 October 1989 at the Howaldtswerke-Deutsche Werft AG shipyard in Kiel, Germany. Delivered on 1 April 1990 and registered in Haifa, the new 3351 TEU container ship enabled Zim to offer a weekly fixed-day sailing schedule for its customers. The ZIM America was later re-registered under the Maltese flag of convenience in 2004 with Valletta as her home port, and in 2007 she was renamed Andaman Sea.

In 2010 the Andaman Sea was sold to Daina Shipping Co., a subsidiary of the Greek shipping company Costamare Inc. She was renamed Rena and registered in the port of Monrovia in Liberia.

=== 2011 grounding and oil spill ===
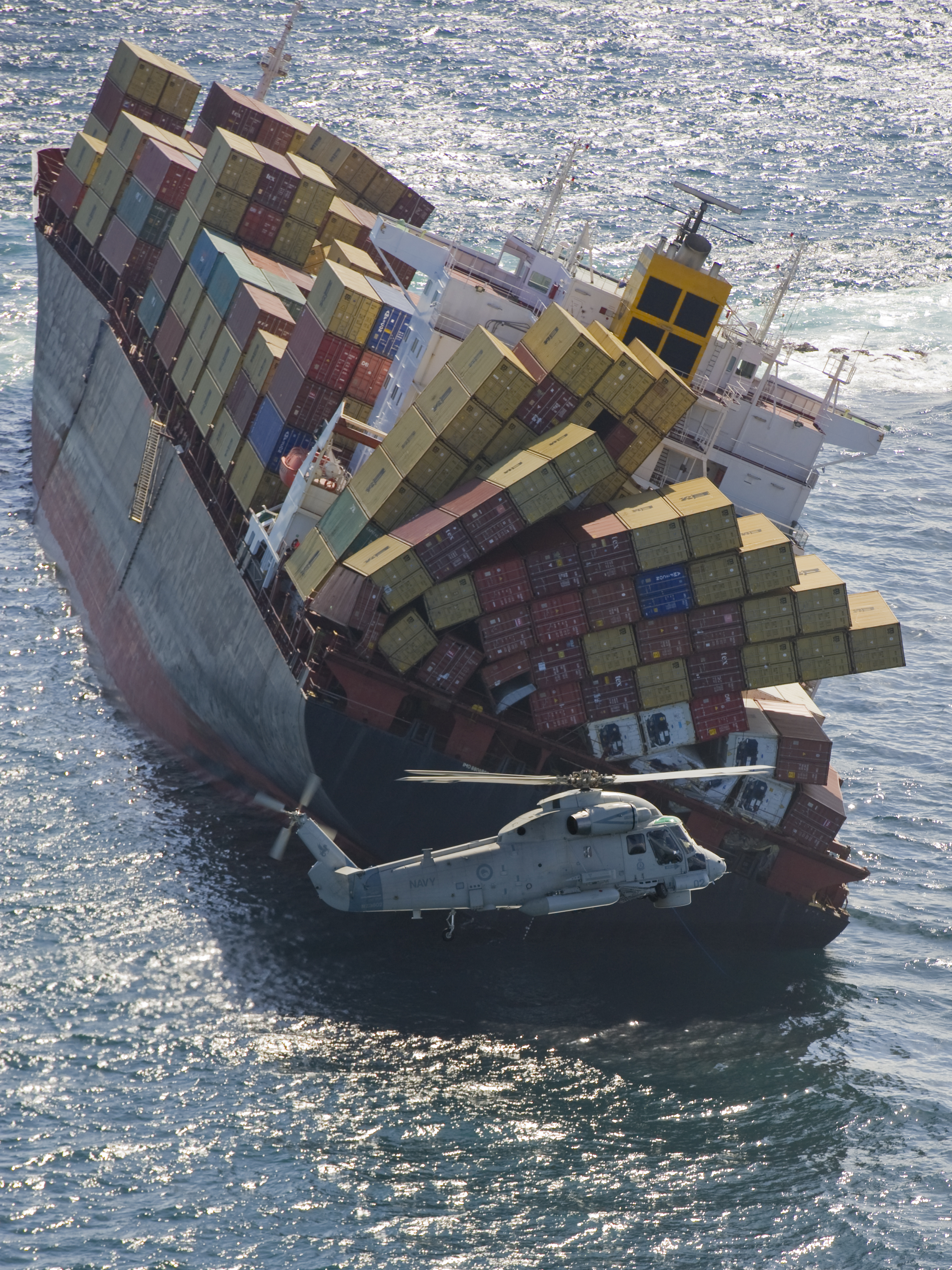
Rena aground

On Wednesday, 5 October 2011, at 2:20 AM while sailing from Napier to Tauranga, the Rena ran aground on the Astrolabe Reef off the Bay of Plenty, New Zealand. The ship was carrying 1,368 containers, eight of which contained hazardous materials, as well as 1,700 tonnes of heavy fuel oil and 200 tonnes of marine diesel.

By Sunday, 9 October, a 5-kilometre (3.1 mi) oil slick threatened wildlife and the area's rich fishing waters. Oil from the Rena began washing ashore at Mount Maunganui beach on 10 October. Bad weather that night caused the ship to shift on the reef, and the crew were evacuated. The shifting of the ship caused further damage, resulting in a further 130–350 tonnes of oil leaking.

On 11 October the spill was declared New Zealand's worst ever maritime environmental disaster by Environment Minister Nick Smith.

By 13 October the ship was listing by 20°, and 88 of her 1368 containers had fallen into the sea.

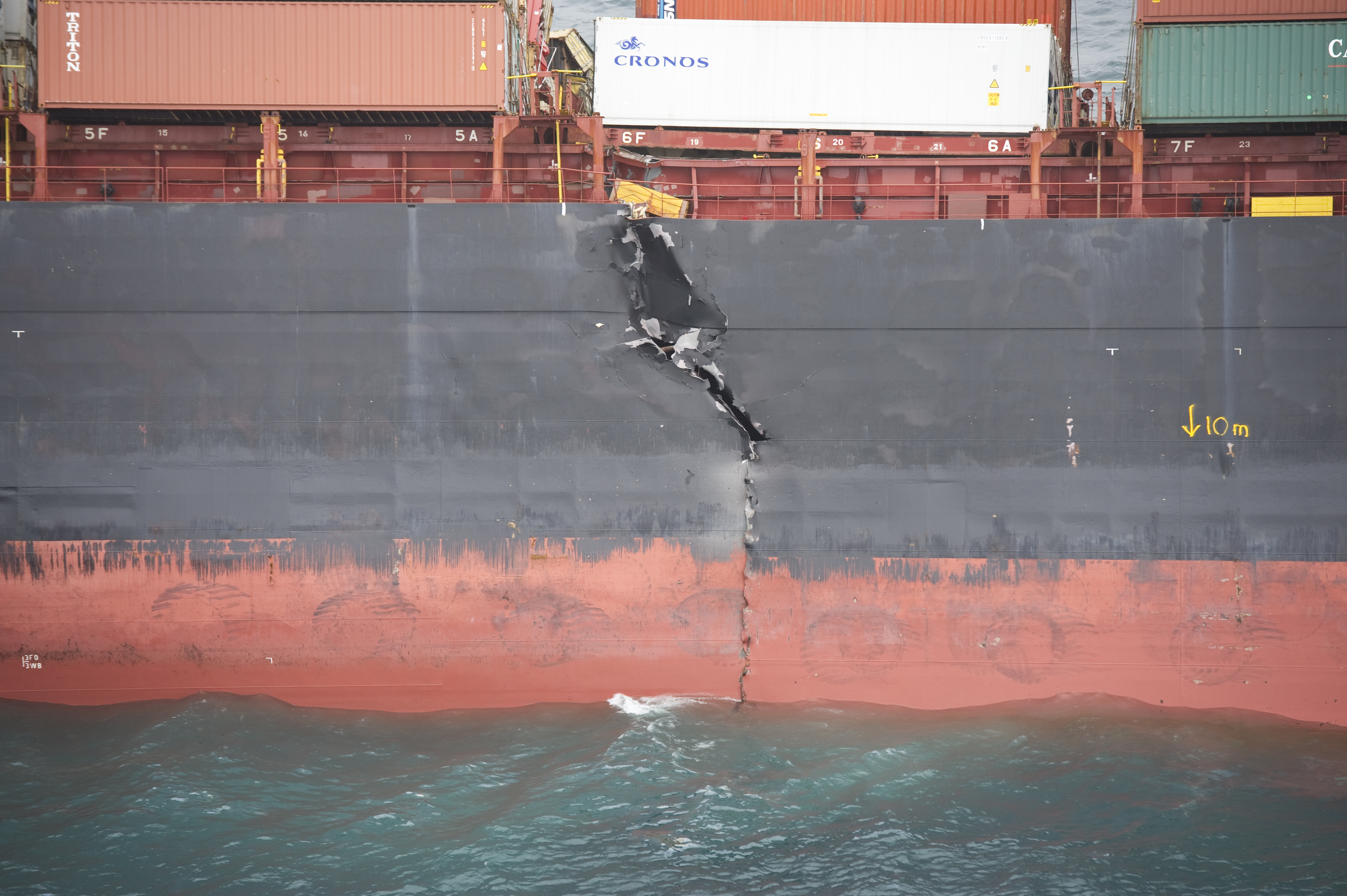
Rena splitting

Due to increased pressure to her hull, Rena was expected at any point to split in two, furthering the environmental impact of the disaster. It was reported on 14 October 2011, that Rena had cracked in two, held together only by her internal structure and the reef itself.

On 8 January 2012, it was reported that the Rena had broken in two, and while the bow section remained firmly grounded on the reef, the split had caused both sections to slew away from each other and settle lower in the water. This caused further debris and oil to be released into the sea. By 10 January the stern section had been submerged almost completely, and on 4 April it slipped further down the reef and disappeared completely from the surface.

== Current status ==
By June 2014, the wreck had been salvaged of approximately 77% of the initial containers. Major pieces of the wreck have been removed, including the entire bow section being leveled one metre below the low tide mark, removal of the 350-tonne accommodation block (down to D deck), and a major piece of the port side. All fuel and oils were removed, except for about 1 tonne of clingage. There was an ongoing search for the last container of plastic beads. Under the salvage operation, more than 850 tonnes of debris were removed from the area.

In a report by the ship's owner, it was noted that the anti-fouling paint on the wreck contains zinc, diuron, copper, and tributyltin (TBT). The same report noted that there is "localised contamination of TBT in on-reef sediments at Astrolabe." The Sediment Quality Report submitted by the ship's owners as part of their resource consent application to leave the wreck on Astrolabe noted, "Sediment contaminant concentrations on Astrolabe Reef adjacent to the wreck indicates adverse effects on organisms are likely to be occurring due to elevated concentrations of copper, zinc, TBT, and PAHs."

In February 2016, Daina Shipping was granted consent to leave the unrecovered portions of MV Rena in place on the reef. Salvage and recovery works were completed on 4 April 2016 and the former exclusion zone around the site was lifted. As part of the official access plan, two dive sites for advanced divers were unveiled on a website providing fishing, snorkeling, diving, and safety information. Between them, these two sites cover the bulk of the remaining bow wreckage, while diving to the much deeper stern wreckage is not officially recommended.

In December 2020, divers discovered that nature is in the process of recovery and the wreck is becoming a thriving kelp forest. Divers are monitoring for any pieces of steel that might become dislodged and float in the tide to damage the reef, as well as the status of 5 to 10 tonnes of granulated copper trapped underneath the wreck's hull. The team will keep monitoring the MV Rena for the next 20 years to check it causes no further damage to the reef and any issues are identified early.

== See also ==
- List of oil spills
