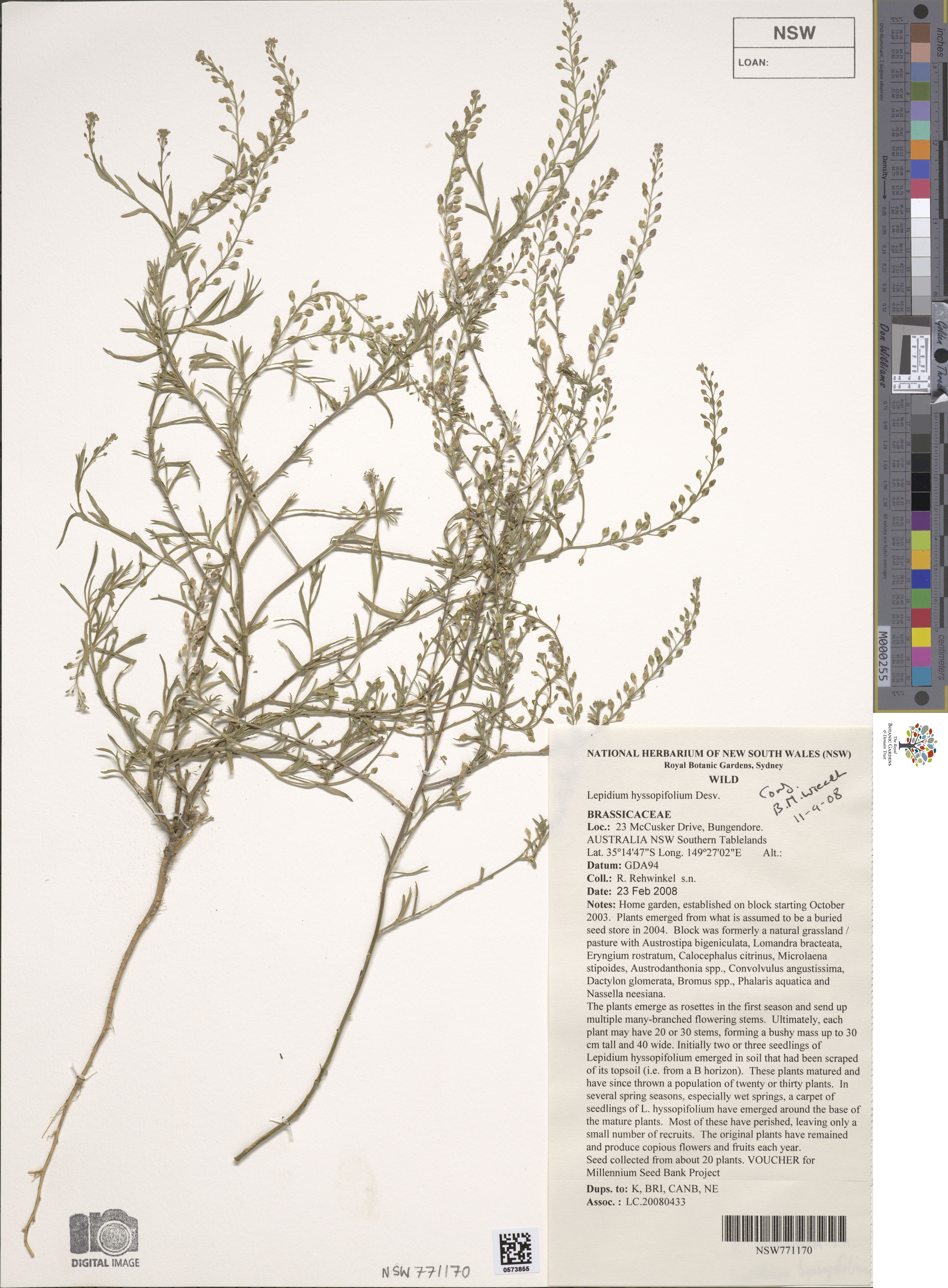

Conservation status
- Endangered (TSPA)

Scientific classification
- Kingdom: Plantae
- Clade: Tracheophytes
- Clade: Angiosperms
- Clade: Eudicots
- Clade: Rosids
- Order: Brassicales
- Family: Brassicaceae
- Genus: Lepidium
- Species: L. hyssopifolium

Binomial name
- Lepidium hyssopifolium Desv. 1815
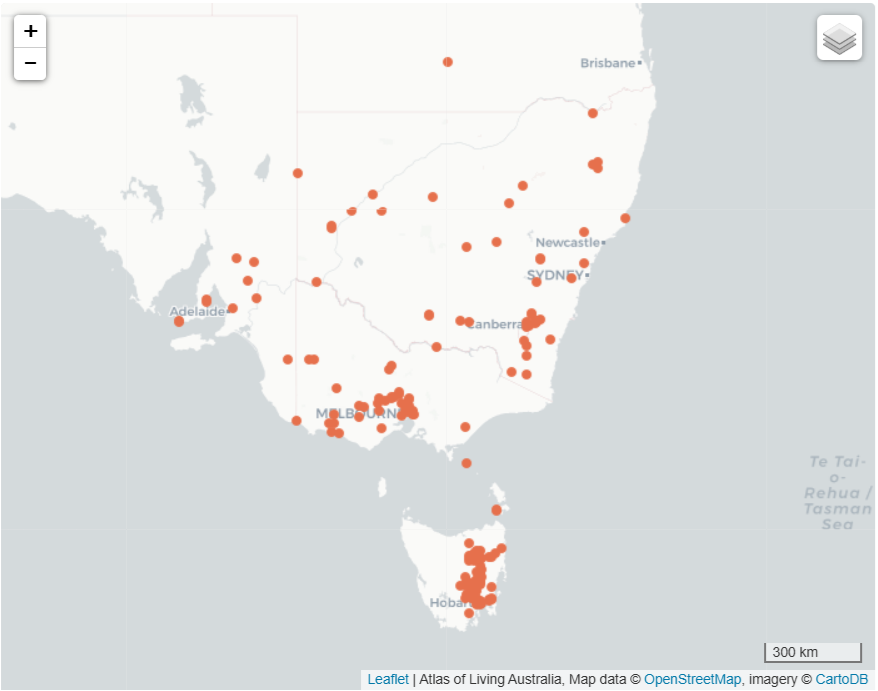
- Distribution map of Lepidium hyssopifolium in Australia

= Lepidium hyssopifolium =

Species of flowering plant endemic to Australia

Lepidium hyssopifolium, commonly known as the aromatic peppercress (Note: other common names include basalt peppercress, soft peppercress, and pepperwort) is an endemic angiosperm of Australia. It is widespread in grassland areas of Tasmania, Victoria and New South Wales in scattered populations. The species became naturalised to New Zealand in 1979. Its common name is derived from it having a strong, noticeable spicy scent when the leaves are crushed.

== Description ==
Lepidium hyssopifolium is a small herb that is perennial or biennial and can grow up to 0.5 m (1 ft 8 in) tall. The plant may be covered in fine, soft bristles or tiny needle-like hairs, although some individuals appear almost smooth.

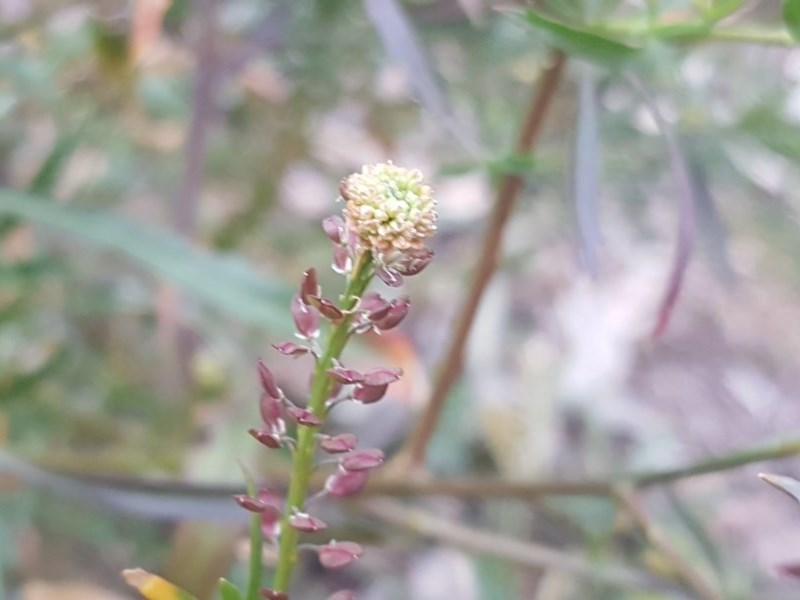
Flowers

The leaves grow both at the base of the plant and along the stems. The lower leaves can be up to 10 centimetres (3.9 in) long and are often deeply divided into narrow segments, giving them a slightly fern-like appearance.

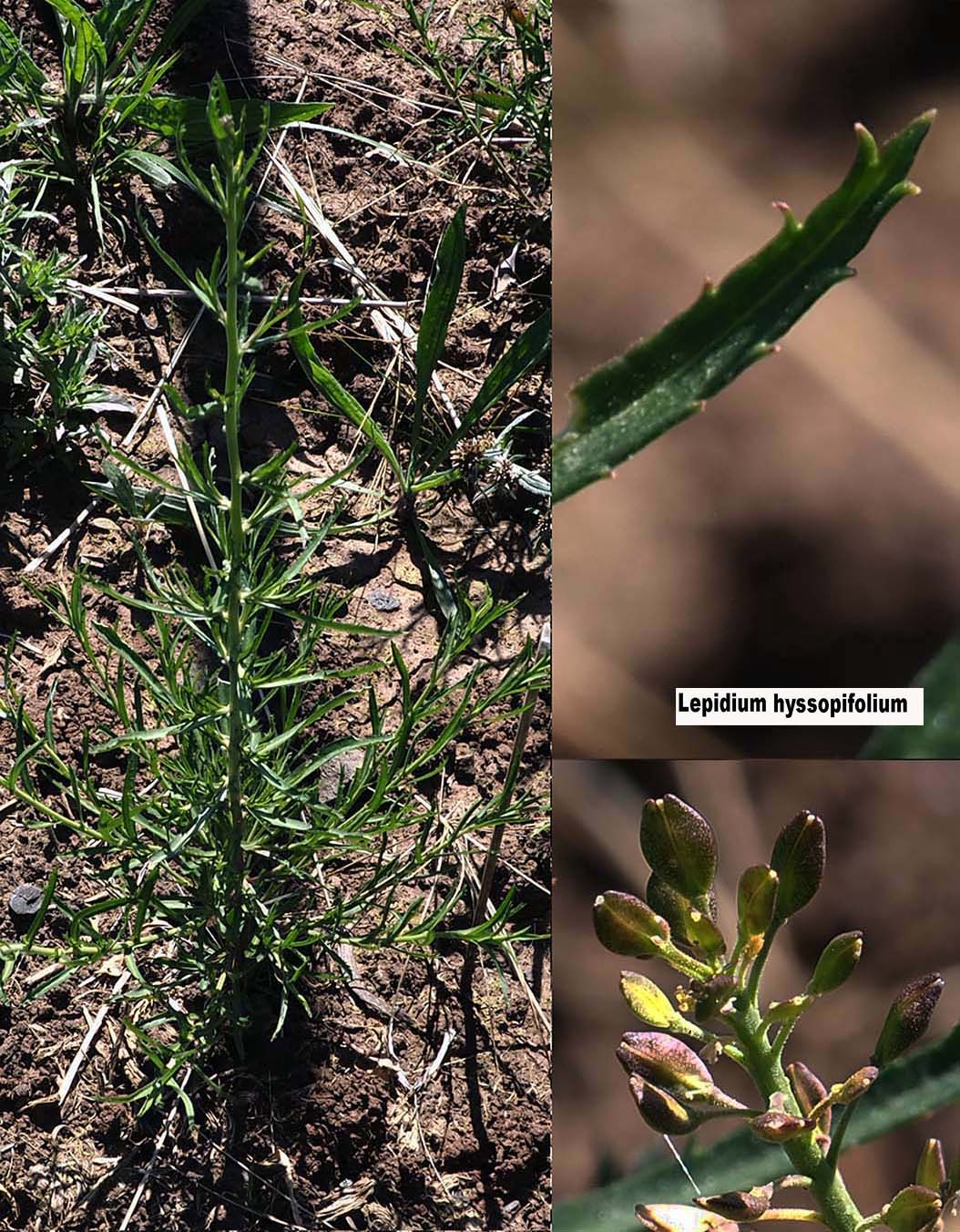
Leaves

Leaves along the stem are much smaller and narrower, becoming progressively smaller higher up the plant. Their edges may be smooth or slightly toothed. The flowers are tiny and greenish, arranged along a simple, upright cluster. Each flower usually has four tiny sepals and may have four tiny petals, though petals are sometimes absent. Flowering mainly occurs from summer through autumn. After flowering, the plant produces small, oval to narrow seed pods that are only a few millimetres long (2–5mm). These pods may be slightly hairy and have a small notch at the tip. The fine details of the flowers and seed pods are quite small and are usually best seen with a magnifying lens. L. hyssopifolium can sometimes be confused with the introduced Lepidium africanum, as both are small peppercresses that grow in disturbed habitats. However, several features distinguish them. A key difference lies in their life cycle. The former is perennial or biennial, whereas the latter is typically annual and completes its life cycle within a single season.

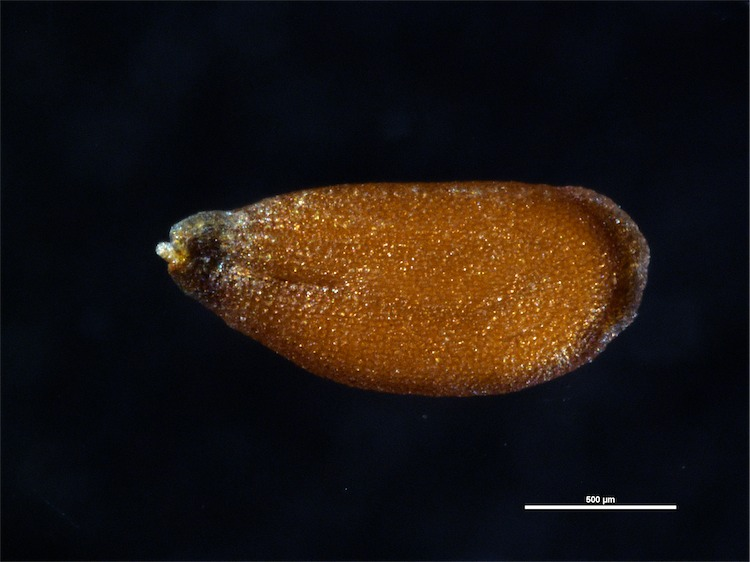
Seed

They also differ in appearance: the native species is often covered in fine, soft hairs, giving it a slightly greyish-green appearance, while the introduced species is generally less hairy and may appear smoother. The lower leaves of the former are usually more deeply divided into narrow segments, whereas those of the latter are typically less finely dissected. The most reliable way to separate the two is by examining the fruit. In the native species, the small seed pods are oval to narrow in shape and only slightly notched at the tip. In the introduced species, the seed pods are usually more distinctly notched and may appear broader.

== Habitat and distribution ==
The species is typically associated with open and disturbed environments.

In Tasmania, it has been recorded in grasslands, roadside verges, pasture margins, coastal flats, and areas with seasonally damp clay soils. It appears to favour heavy or clay-based substrates and sites where competition from taller vegetation is limited. Although the species tolerates disturbance, it does not compete well in densely vegetated habitats.Its persistence depends upon periodic disturbances that maintain open ground conditions.

In Tasmania, Lepidium hyssopifolium has a restricted and fragmented distribution. Confirmed populations are generally small and isolated, occurring primarily in lowland regions. Records indicate that the species is scattered across modified landscapes rather than within intact native ecosystems. The limited number of known sites increases its vulnerability to local extinction.

== Ecology ==
Ecologically, Lepidium hyssopifolium is likely pollinated by small insects attracted to its tiny flowers. Reproduction occurs via seed, and soil seed banks that play an important role in maintaining populations between favourable seasons. As an early successional or disturbance-associated species, it occupies ecological niches that are often transitional and vulnerable to land-use changes.

== Threats and conservation ==
The primary threats to Lepidium hyssopifolium in Tasmania include agricultural intensification, urban development, weed invasion, grazing pressure, and habitat fragmentation. The conversion of lowland grasslands and damp clay soils into more intensively managed land uses has reduced suitable habitat. Additionally, invasive plant species can outcompete this relatively small and non-dominant herb.

Because populations are small and isolated, stochastic events such as drought, land clearing, or changes in management practices may have disproportionate impacts. Consequently, the species is listed as endangered under Tasmanian legislation. Conservation strategies generally focus on protecting known sites, managing invasive weeds, controlling grazing pressure, and conducting regular monitoring to track population trends.
