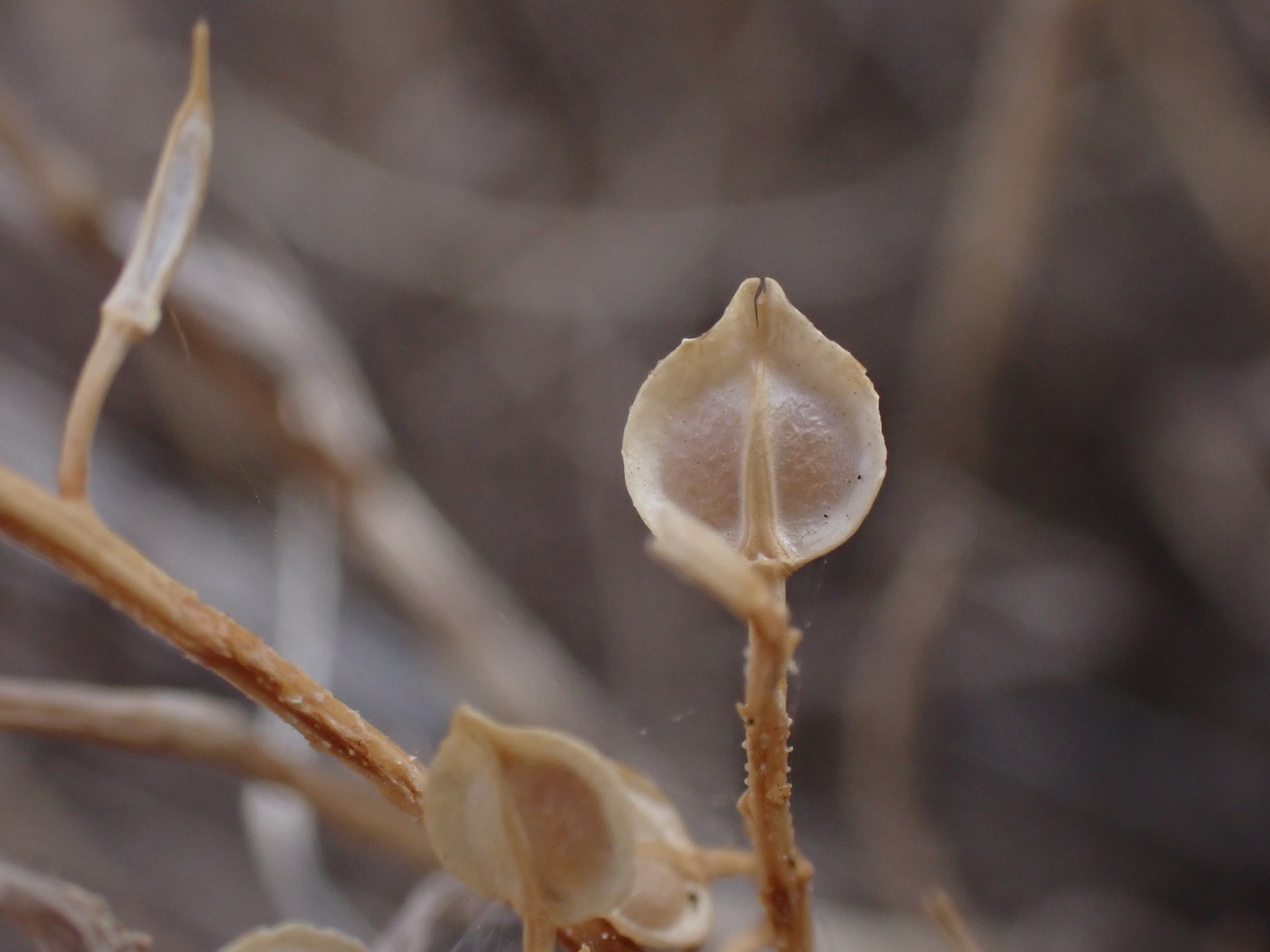

Scientific classification
- Kingdom: Plantae
- Clade: Tracheophytes
- Clade: Angiosperms
- Clade: Eudicots
- Clade: Rosids
- Order: Brassicales
- Family: Brassicaceae
- Genus: Lepidium
- Species: L. monoplocoides

Binomial name
- Lepidium monoplocoides F.Muell

= Lepidium monoplocoides =

Species of flowering plant

Lepidium monoplocoides, the winged peppercress, is a nationally endangered plant species endemic to inland south-eastern Australia. The winged peppercress can grow from 15 up to 20 centimetres tall. This plant has long, slender leaves. Because of destruction of habitat, this plant is endangered. The winged peppercress has green-brown flowers which grow at the end of stems.

The winged peppercress also grows fruit. The fruit grows along the length of stems. The fruit is what defines the winged peppercress as a different species than other peppercress plants. Population locations include grasslands, wetlands, floodplain woodlands, and chenopod scrublands.

Lepidium monoplocoides is listed as endangered in Victoria under the DELWP Advisory List of Rare or Threatened Plants in Victoria, listed as threatened in Victoria under the Flora and Fauna Guarantee Act 1988, and listed as endangered in Australia under the Environment Protection and Biodiversity Conservation Act 1999.
