= Lepidium nesophilum =

Scientific classification
- Kingdom: Plantae
- Clade: Tracheophytes
- Clade: Angiosperms
- Clade: Eudicots
- Clade: Rosids
- Order: Brassicales
- Family: Brassicaceae
- Genus: Lepidium
- Species: L. nesophilum

Binomial name
- Lepidium nesophilum Hewson (1990)

Species of flowering plant

Lepidium nesophilum is a species of flowering plant in the mustard and cabbage family that is endemic to the subtropical Lord Howe Island in the Tasman Sea between Australia and New Zealand.

It is a perennial herb or subshrub found on basalt ledges at low elevations. It is erect or decumbent, hairless, with a stem trailing to 1.5 m. The leaves are narrowly oblanceolate to lanceolate or elliptic, 3–12 cm long, 0.5–2 cm wide. The small white flowers have petals 1.5–2.5 mm long. The seeds are ellipsoidal and about 2 mm long.

The specific epithet nesophilim is derived from the Greek word nesos 'island' and the common suffix -philus 'loving', alluding to its island home.
