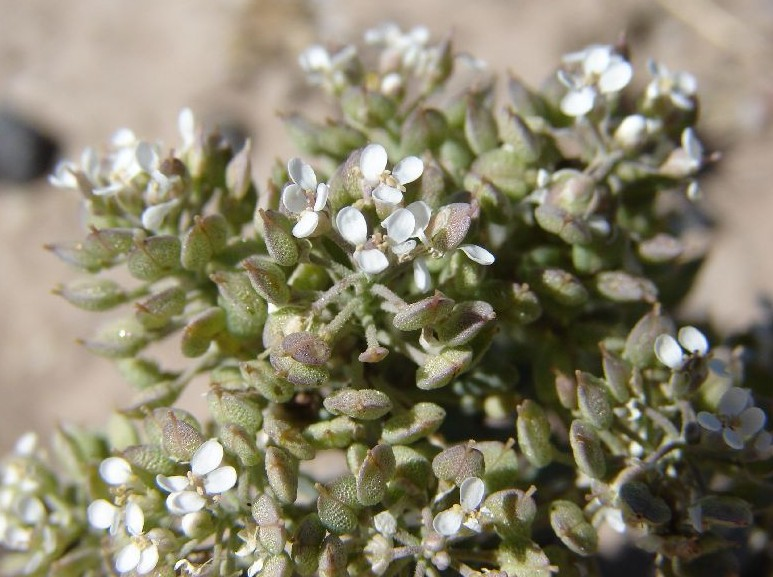

Conservation status
- Imperiled (NatureServe)

Scientific classification
- Kingdom: Plantae
- Clade: Tracheophytes
- Clade: Angiosperms
- Clade: Eudicots
- Clade: Rosids
- Order: Brassicales
- Family: Brassicaceae
- Genus: Lepidium
- Species: L. papilliferum

Binomial name
- Lepidium papilliferum Reveal

= Lepidium papilliferum =

Species of flowering plant

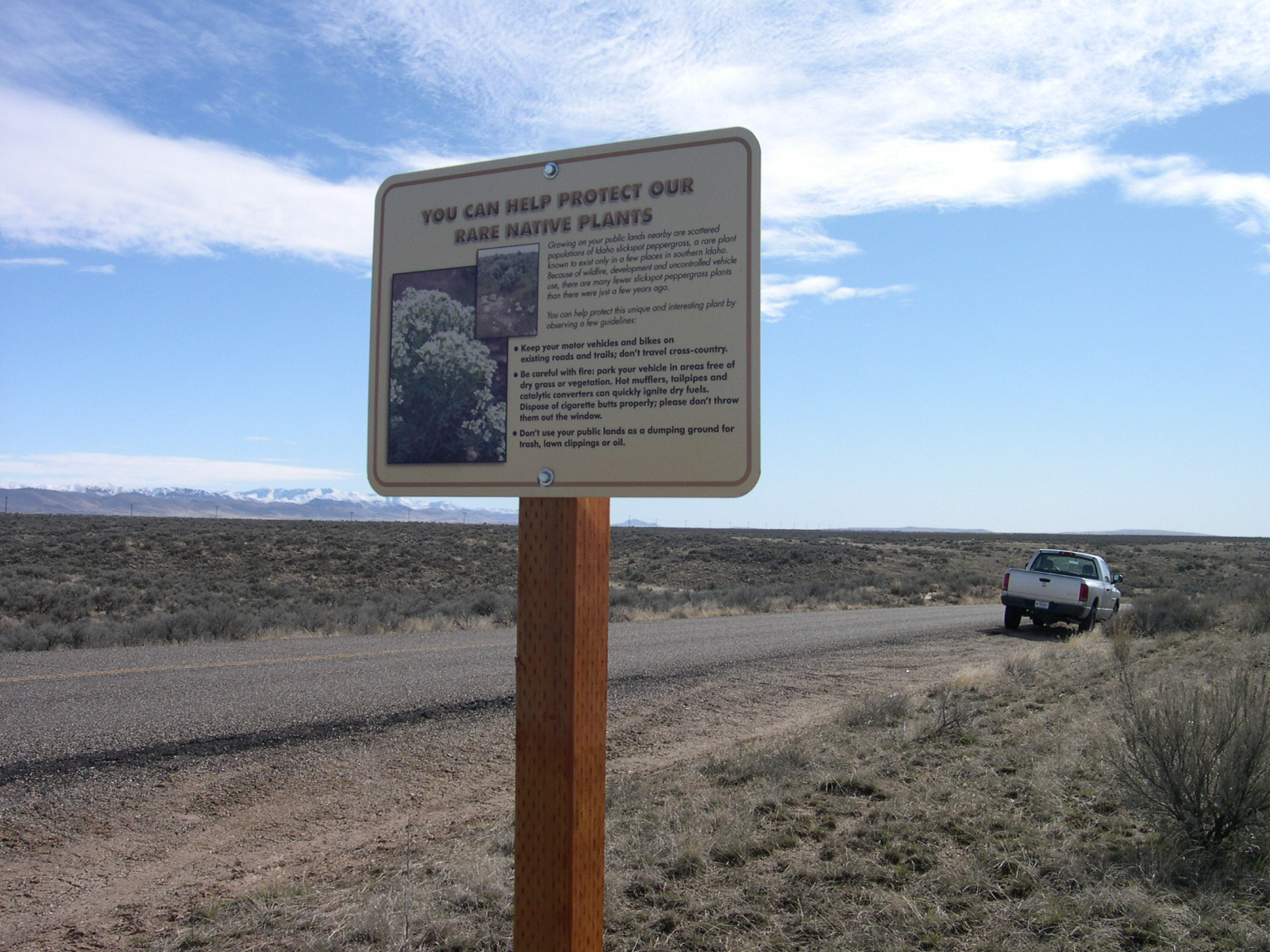
Lepidium papilliferum (slickspot peppergrass) sign on Snake River Plains

Lepidium papilliferum is a rare species of flowering plant in the mustard family known by the common names Idaho pepperweed and slickspot peppergrass. It is endemic to Idaho in the United States, where it is mostly limited to a specific habitat type in the southwestern part of the state. It was federally listed as a threatened species in 2009.

This is an herb growing just a few centimeters to over 20 centimeters tall, and known to approach 40 centimeters. The leaves are divided into many subdivided lobes, the largest blades measuring 4 centimeters in length. The inflorescence is a raceme of many white flowers. The fruit is a rounded, flattened, winged silique up to 3 or 4 millimeters long by 3 to 4 wide. There is an annual form and a biennial form of the plant, the annual form completing its life cycle in one year and the biennial not producing flowers or seed until its second year.

This plant grows in the sagebrush steppe ecosystem, where it can be found in microsites called slick spots, patches of soil covered in a cryptogamic crust of cyanobacteria and algae. Occurrences outside of slick spots are rare. Slick spot soil is generally relatively high in sodium and clay, and the spots are mostly bare of vegetation and very slightly indented so that water accumulates. The soil is lighter in color than surrounding soils. In the dry season the water evaporates and the area becomes very dry. Slick spots take a long time to form; those existing now were likely formed during the Pleistocene, and then altered early in the Holocene when salt deposits were layered over them by wind. It is thought that slick spots are no longer being formed in today's climate, so when they are destroyed they are permanently lost.

The slickspot peppergrass population in the slick spots varies with annual moisture levels; more spring precipitation allows the growth of more plants. In general, the population is thought to have declined over time. Slick spot habitat in its limited area has been degraded by agriculture, grazing of cattle, urban development, and wildfire. The frequency of wildfire is increasing as the habitat is invaded by introduced plants such as cheatgrass (Bromus tectorum).
