= Lepidium arbuscula =

Conservation status
- Critically Imperiled (NatureServe)

Scientific classification
- Kingdom: Plantae
- Clade: Tracheophytes
- Clade: Angiosperms
- Clade: Eudicots
- Clade: Rosids
- Order: Brassicales
- Family: Brassicaceae
- Genus: Lepidium
- Species: L. arbuscula

Binomial name
- Lepidium arbuscula Hillebr.

Species of flowering plant

Lepidium arbuscula is a rare species of flowering plant in the mustard family known by the common names `anaunau and Waianae Range pepperwort. It is endemic to Hawaii, where it is known only from the Waianae Mountains on the island of Oahu. In 2003 there were ten populations remaining with fewer than 1000 individuals in total. It is a federally listed endangered species of the US.

This is a shrub growing to a maximum height near 1.2 meters. The leaves are clustered around the ends of the gnarled branches. Little is known about the biology of the species.

It is threatened by the loss and degradation of its habitat, which is mainly due to the presence of feral ungulates such as goats and pigs, and introduced plant species such as fire tree (Morella faya).
