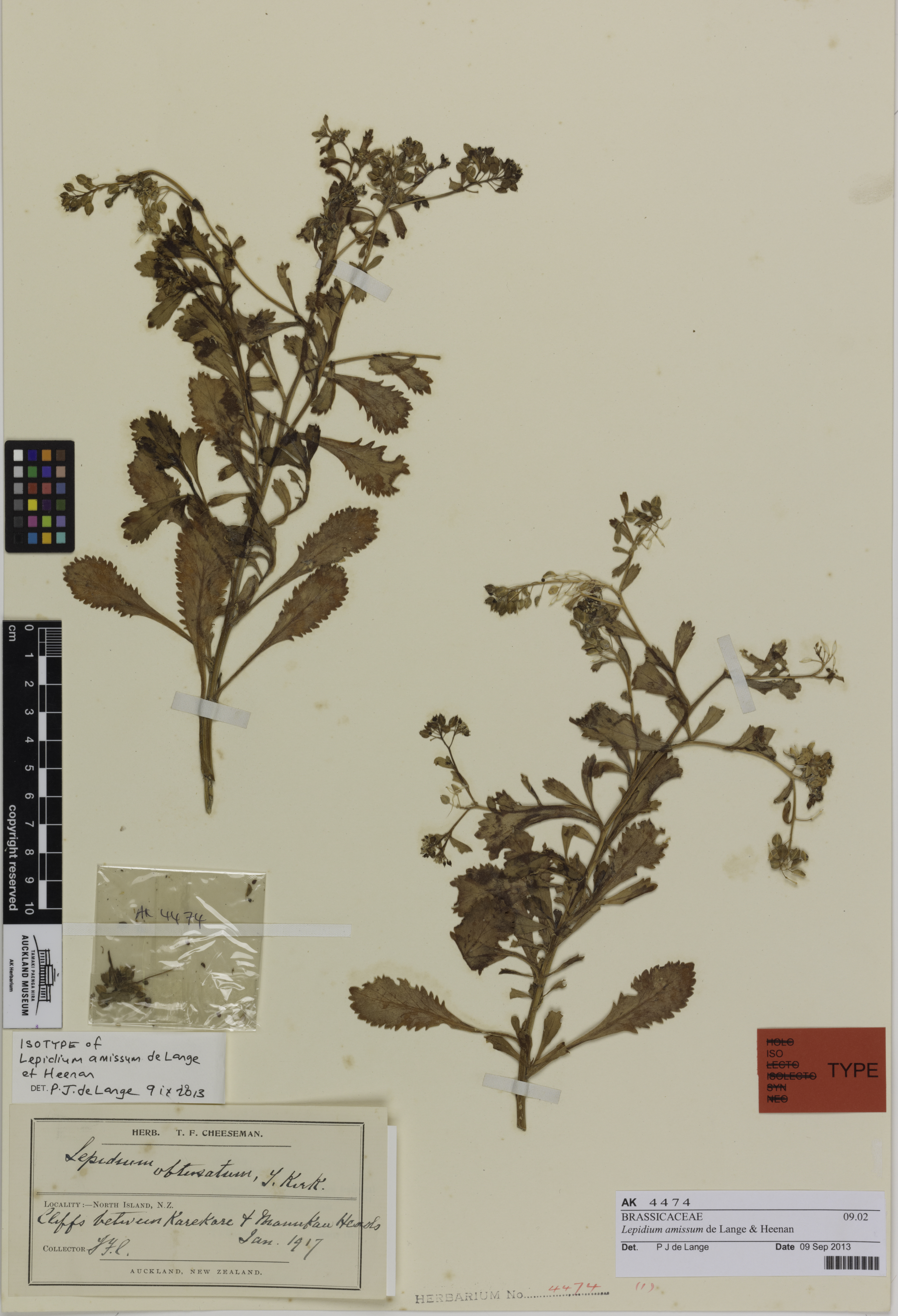
- Holotype from the herbarium of the Auckland War Memorial Museum

Conservation status
- Extinct (NZ TCS)

- Extinct (IUCN 3.1)

Scientific classification
- Kingdom: Plantae
- Clade: Tracheophytes
- Clade: Angiosperms
- Clade: Eudicots
- Clade: Rosids
- Order: Brassicales
- Family: Brassicaceae
- Genus: Lepidium
- Species: †L. amissum

Binomial name
- †Lepidium amissum de Lange & Heenan
- Known original native range

= Lepidium amissum =

Species of plant

Lepidium amissum, also known as Waitakere scurvy grass, is an extinct species of plant in the family Brassicaceae. The plant was first described by Peter de Lange and Peter Brian Heenan in 2013, and was formerly endemic to the sea cliffs of the Waitākere Ranges of West Auckland, New Zealand.

== Taxonomy ==
The species was formally described in 2013 by Peter de Lange and Peter Brian Heenan, based on specimens collected from cliff faces of the coastal Waitākere Ranges by Thomas Cheeseman, with the first known specimen collected in December 1870. Prior to identification as a species in 2013, the specimens had been identified as Lepidium obtusatum. Cheeseman briefly mentions the species in the 1906 edition of the Manual of the New Zealand flora, stating that L. obtusatum can be found on "sea-cliffs to the north of the Manukau Harbour, rare." The species epithet amissum is derived from the Latin word amissus, meaning lost, referring to its extinction.

Due to the degradation of herbarium specimens, a genetic analysis of the plant was not able to be undertaken for the species when it was discovered.

== Description ==
Lepidium amissum was a perennial herb with sparingly leafy stems, and lacked a rhizome. The plant had untidy leafy branches, with deeply toothed dark green leaves. The flowers of the species were white with four stamens.

== Extinction ==
The last known specimen was collected in 1917. The plant's extinction may have been caused by the coastline modifying effects of the kauri logging industry of the 19th century, or due to the effects of its discovery by Cheeseman.

== Distribution and habitat ==
The species was endemic to New Zealand, thought to grow exclusively along sea cliffs of the coastline of the Waitākere Ranges of West Auckland, New Zealand.
