= Lepidium puberulum =

Scientific classification
- Kingdom: Plantae
- Clade: Tracheophytes
- Clade: Angiosperms
- Clade: Eudicots
- Clade: Rosids
- Order: Brassicales
- Family: Brassicaceae
- Genus: Lepidium
- Species: L. puberulum

Binomial name
- Lepidium puberulum Bunge

Species of flowering plant

Lepidium puberulum is an annual herb in the family Brassicaceae, endemic to the west coast of Western Australia. The species has white or green flowers that appear from July to November (mid winter to late spring) in its native range.
