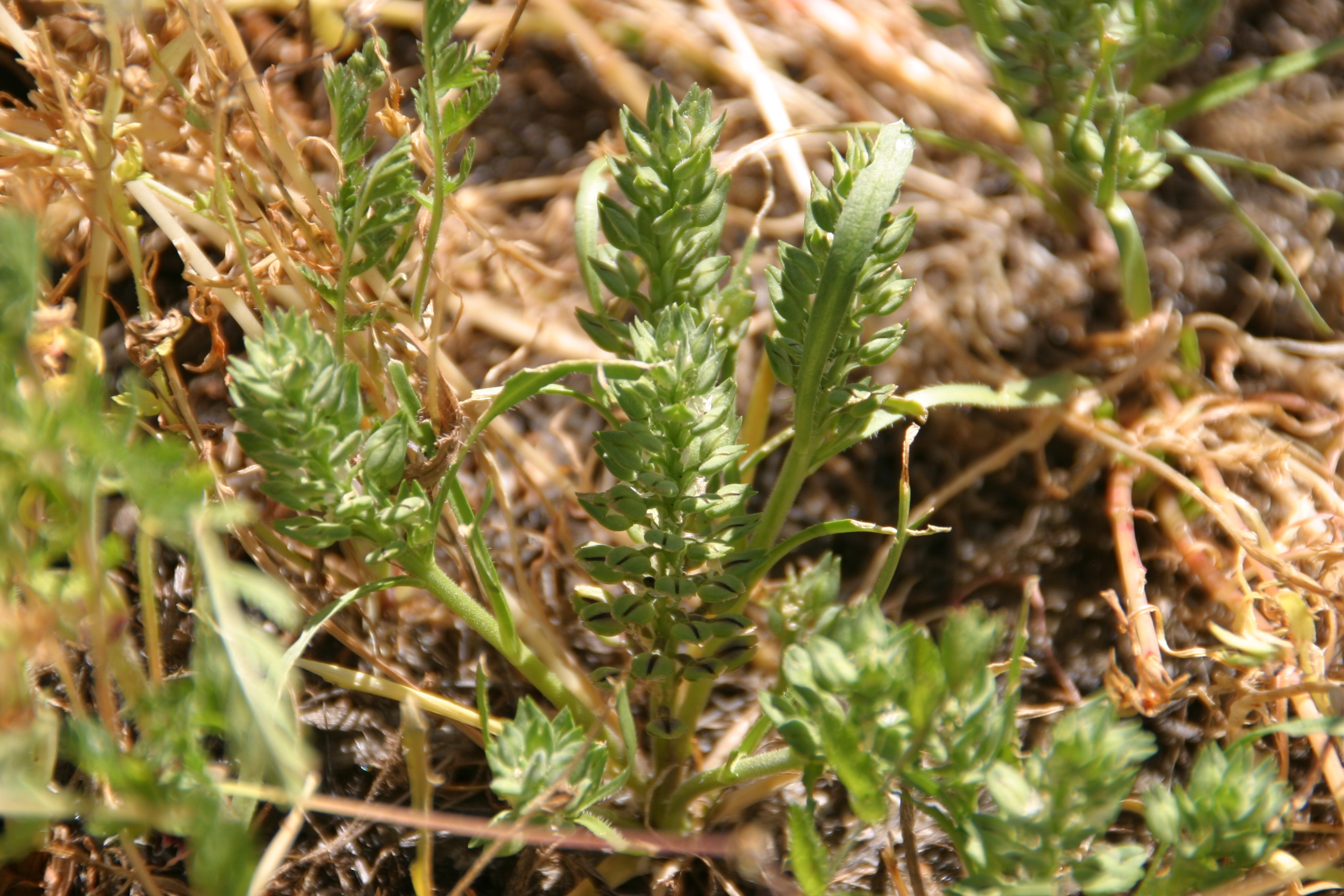

Scientific classification
- Kingdom: Plantae
- Clade: Tracheophytes
- Clade: Angiosperms
- Clade: Eudicots
- Clade: Rosids
- Order: Brassicales
- Family: Brassicaceae
- Genus: Lepidium
- Species: L. latipes

Binomial name
- Lepidium latipes Hook.

= Lepidium latipes =

Species of flowering plant

Lepidium latipes is a species of flowering plant in the mustard family known by the common name San Diego pepperweed. It is native to California and Baja California, where it grows in alkaline soils in a number of habitat types.

== Description ==
Lepidium latipes is an annual herb producing a short, thick, hairy stem generally under 10 centimeters (3.9 in) tall but sometimes taller. Leaves are linear in shape and several centimeters (inches) long.

The plant produces a dense inflorescence of many tiny, hairy flowers with green petals, their sepals packed between them.

The fruit is a cylindrical, oblong capsule about one-half centimeter (0.20 in) long.
