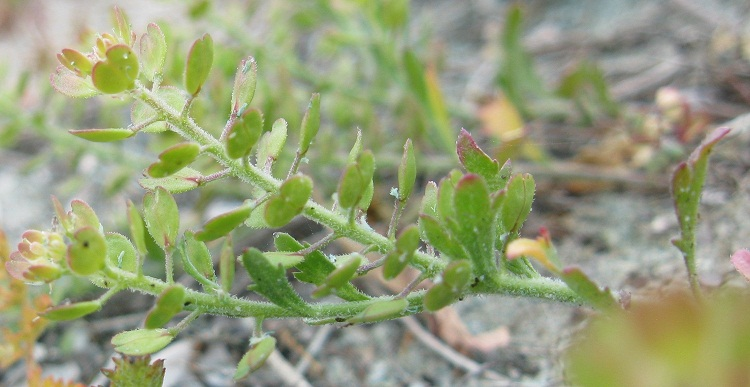

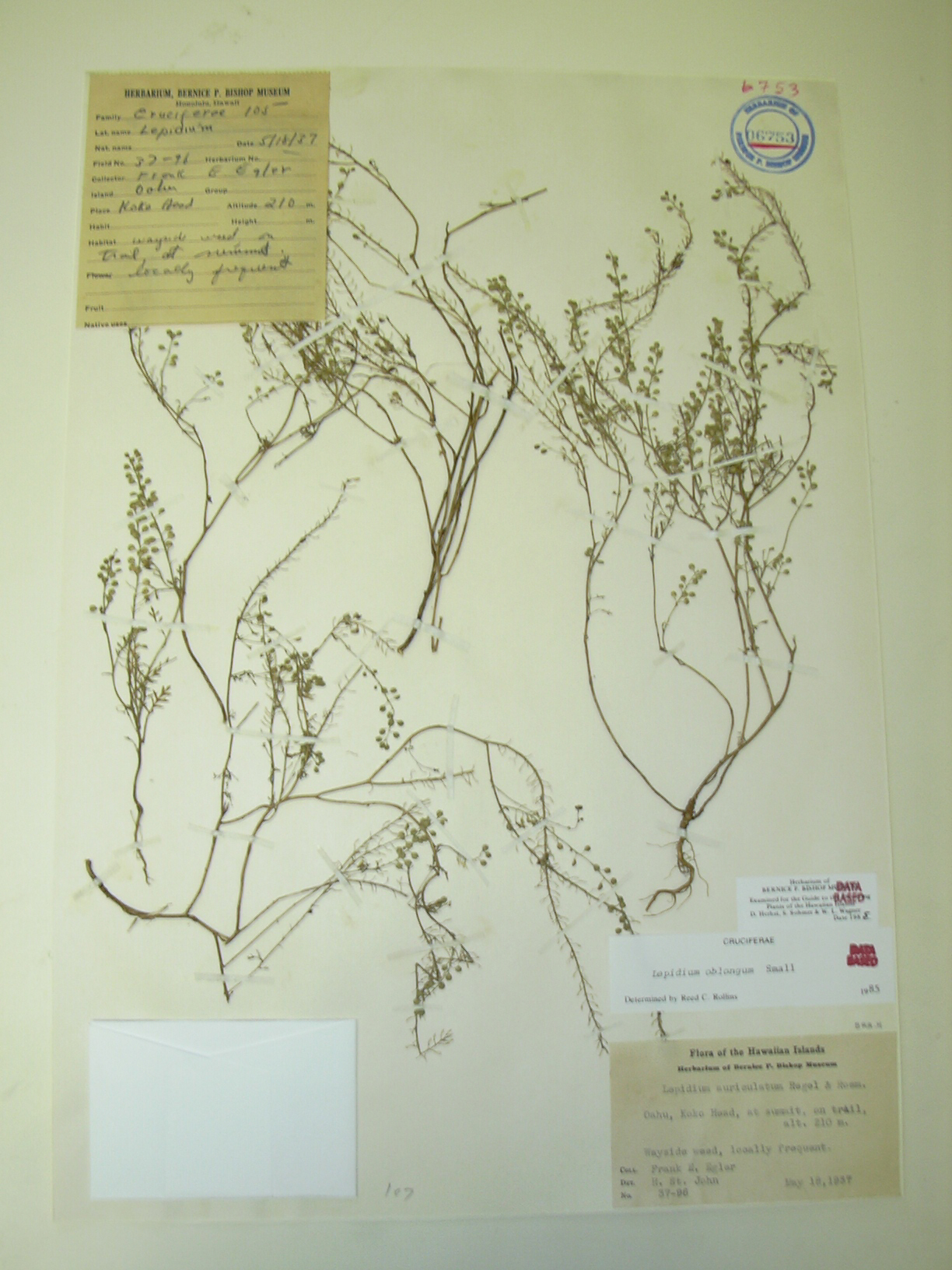
- Specimen collected in Hawai'i

Scientific classification
- Kingdom: Plantae
- Clade: Tracheophytes
- Clade: Angiosperms
- Clade: Eudicots
- Clade: Rosids
- Order: Brassicales
- Family: Brassicaceae
- Genus: Lepidium
- Species: L. oblongum

Binomial name
- Lepidium oblongum Small 1903

Synonyms
- Lepidium greenei Thell.; Lepidium oblongum var. insulare C.L. Hitchc.

= Lepidium oblongum =

Species of flowering plant

Lepidium oblongum is a widespread North American species of flowering plant in the mustard family known by the common name veiny pepperweed. It is native to Mexico, Guatemala, El Salvador, and the western and south-central United States (from California and Oregon east as far as Mississippi). It is present as an introduced species in Hawaii. It can grow in many types of habitats.

== Description ==
Lepidium oblongum is an annual herb with a small, branching stem up to 20 or 30 centimeters (8-12 inches) long and coated with hairs. The well-spaced leaves are divided into narrow lobes. The inflorescence is a raceme of tiny flowers made up just of sepals; there is occasionally a vestigial petal mixed in. The flowers yield fruits which are notched capsules 2 or 3 millimeters long. Flowers bloom March to August. There are two varieties of this plant; one, var. insulare, is known only from coastal California and Baja California. It grows in pastures, prairies, floodplains, roadsides, and alluvial terraces.
