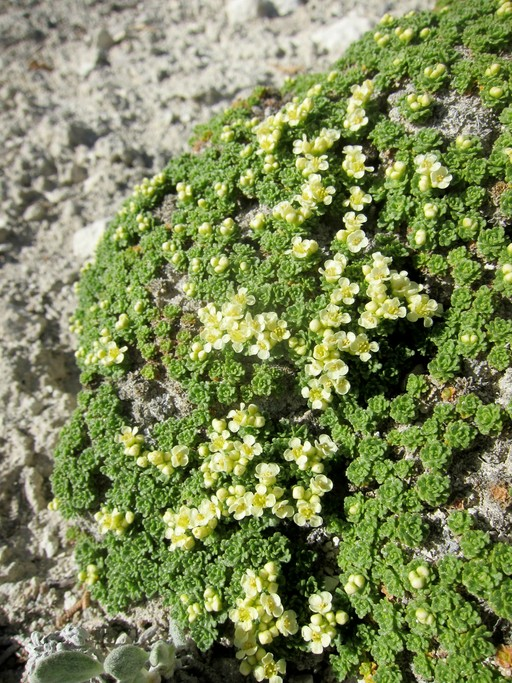

Scientific classification
- Kingdom: Plantae
- Clade: Tracheophytes
- Clade: Angiosperms
- Clade: Eudicots
- Clade: Rosids
- Order: Brassicales
- Family: Brassicaceae
- Genus: Lepidium
- Species: L. nanum

Binomial name
- Lepidium nanum S.Wats.

Synonyms
- Nasturtium nanum (S. Watson) Kuntze

= Lepidium nanum =

Species of flowering plant

Lepidium nanum, the dwarf pepperweed, is a plant species native to the US states of Nevada and Utah. It is known from four counties in Nevada (Nye, Elko, White Pine and Eureka) but only one in Utah (Tooele County). It occurs in open, sunlit areas in the desert, often with gypsum, limestone, quartzite or chalky soils.

Lepidium nanum is a perennial herb with a woody caudex, forming mound-shaped mats on the surface of the ground. Basal leaves are obovate, up to 2.0 inches (5 cm) long. There are no leaves on the stems above ground level. Flowers are yellow to creamy white, born on a raceme of up to 7 flowers. Fruits are egg-shaped, often with wings at the tips.
