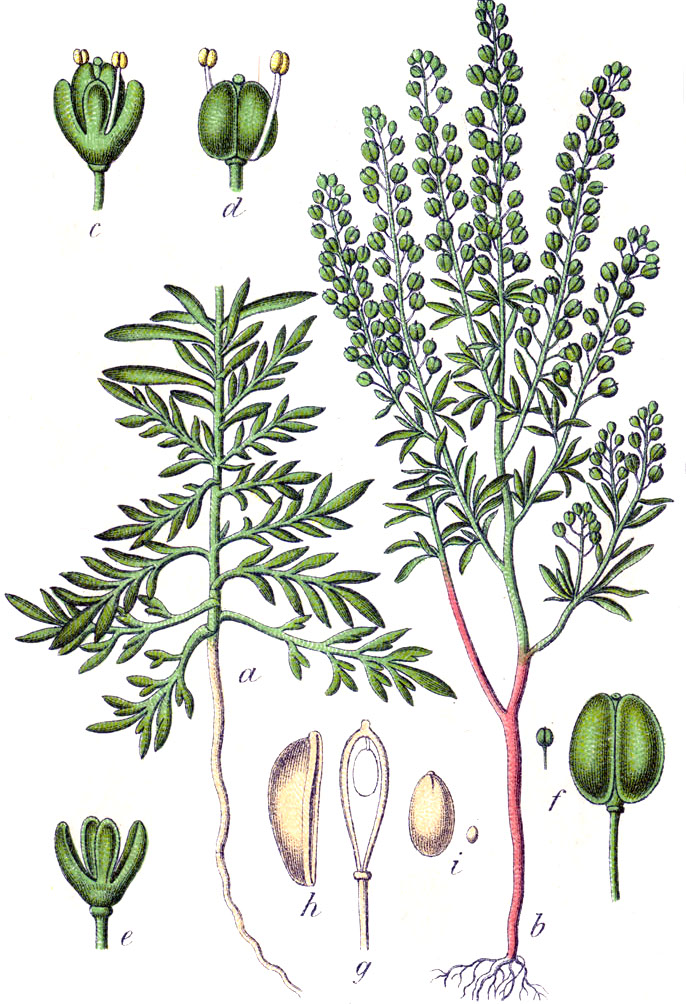

Scientific classification
- Kingdom: Plantae
- Clade: Embryophytes
- Clade: Tracheophytes
- Clade: Angiosperms
- Clade: Eudicots
- Clade: Rosids
- Order: Brassicales
- Family: Brassicaceae
- Genus: Lepidium
- Species: L. ruderale

Binomial name
- Lepidium ruderale L.

= Lepidium ruderale =

Species of flowering plant in the cabbage family

Lepidium ruderale is species of flowering plants in the mustard or cabbage family, Brassicaceae. It is native to temperate Asia and northern and eastern Europe. It has also naturalized in southwestern Europe and North America. Its common names include roadside pepperweed, narrow-leaved pepperwort, narrow-leaf pepperwort, and peppergrass.
