= Lepidium howei-insulae =

- Herbarium specimen

Scientific classification
- Kingdom: Plantae
- Clade: Tracheophytes
- Clade: Angiosperms
- Clade: Eudicots
- Clade: Rosids
- Order: Brassicales
- Family: Brassicaceae
- Genus: Lepidium
- Species: L. howei-insulae

Binomial name
- Lepidium howei-insulae Thell. (1906)

Species of flowering plant

Lepidium howei-insulae , commonly known as mustard & cress, is a flowering plant in the mustard and cabbage family. The specific epithet alludes to Lord Howe Island, where it is found.

== Description ==
It is a perennial subshrub, sometimes with creeping stems, growing to about 1 m in height. The acute to subapiculate, fleshy, glabrous leaves are usually 2–6 cm long, 2–4 mm wide. The small white flowers have petals 1.5 mm long. The ellipsoidal seeds are 1.5 mm long.

== Distribution and habitat ==
The plant is endemic to Australia’s subtropical Lord Howe Island group in the Tasman Sea. As well as having a scattered distribution on the main island, where it occupies rocky ledges and sandy pockets near the sea, it has been recorded from the nearby stack of Balls Pyramid.
