= Lepidium quitense =

Conservation status
- Vulnerable (IUCN 3.1)

Scientific classification
- Kingdom: Plantae
- Clade: Tracheophytes
- Clade: Angiosperms
- Clade: Eudicots
- Clade: Rosids
- Order: Brassicales
- Family: Brassicaceae
- Genus: Lepidium
- Species: L. quitense

Binomial name
- Lepidium quitense Turcz.

Species of flowering plant

Lepidium quitense is a species of flowering plant in the family Brassicaceae. It occurs only in Ecuador. Its natural habitat is subtropical or tropical dry shrubland. It is threatened by habitat loss.
