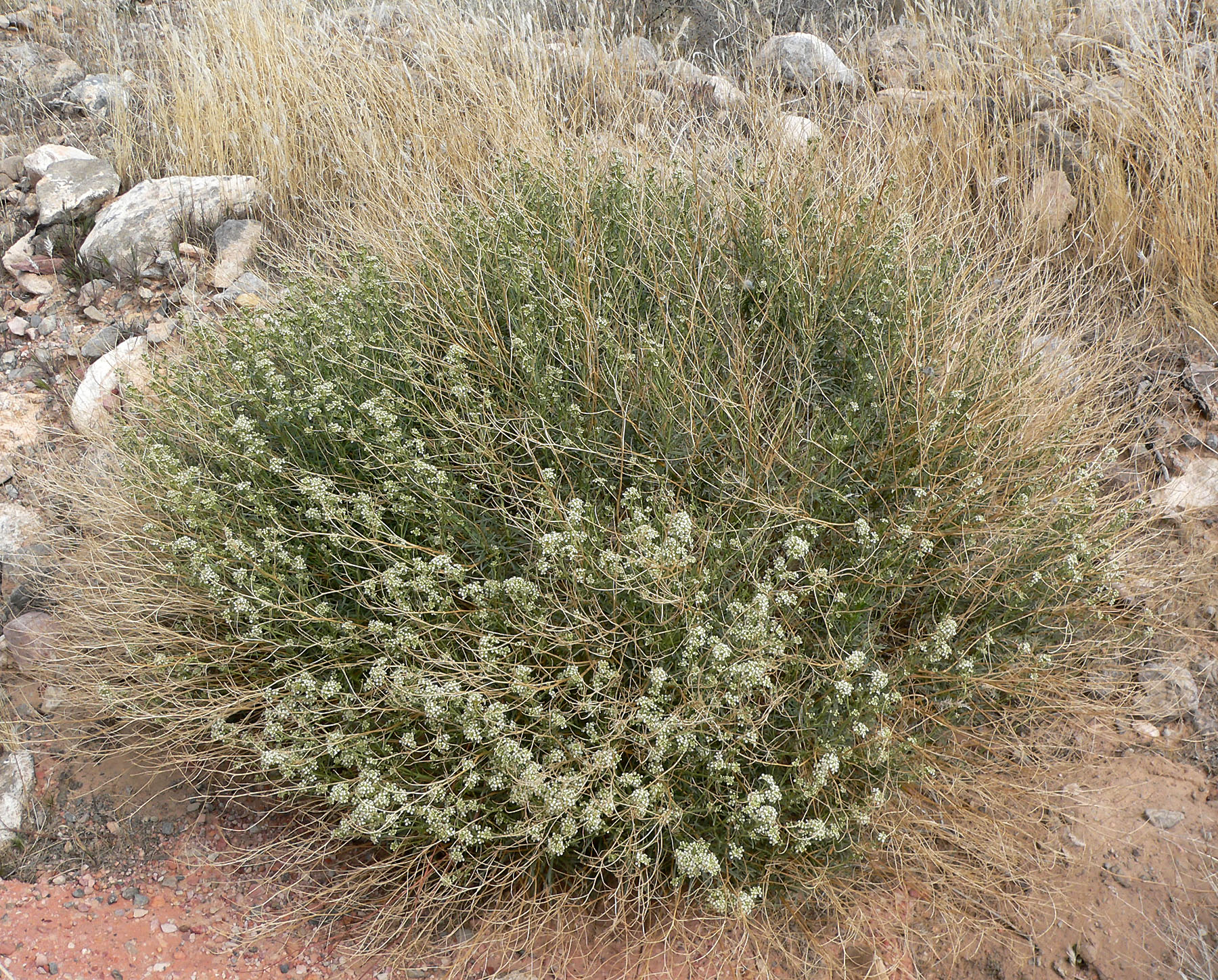

Scientific classification
- Kingdom: Plantae
- Clade: Tracheophytes
- Clade: Angiosperms
- Clade: Eudicots
- Clade: Rosids
- Order: Brassicales
- Family: Brassicaceae
- Genus: Lepidium
- Species: L. fremontii

Binomial name
- Lepidium fremontii S.Wats.

= Lepidium fremontii =

Species of flowering plant

Lepidium fremontii, the desert pepperweed, is a species of flowering plant in the mustard family which is native to the southwestern United States, where it grows on sandy desert flats and the rocky slopes of nearby hills and mountains. It takes its scientific name from John C. Frémont.

== Description ==
Lepidium fremontii is a robust perennial herb producing a branching, tangled gray stem to about a meter in height. The many sprawling stems are foliated in linear leaves up to about 10 centimeters long which may have several fingerlike lobes. The plant produces thick racemes of many small flowers. Each flower has spoon-shaped white petals just a few millimeters long. The fruit is a mostly flattened oblong to rounded capsule under a centimeter long.
