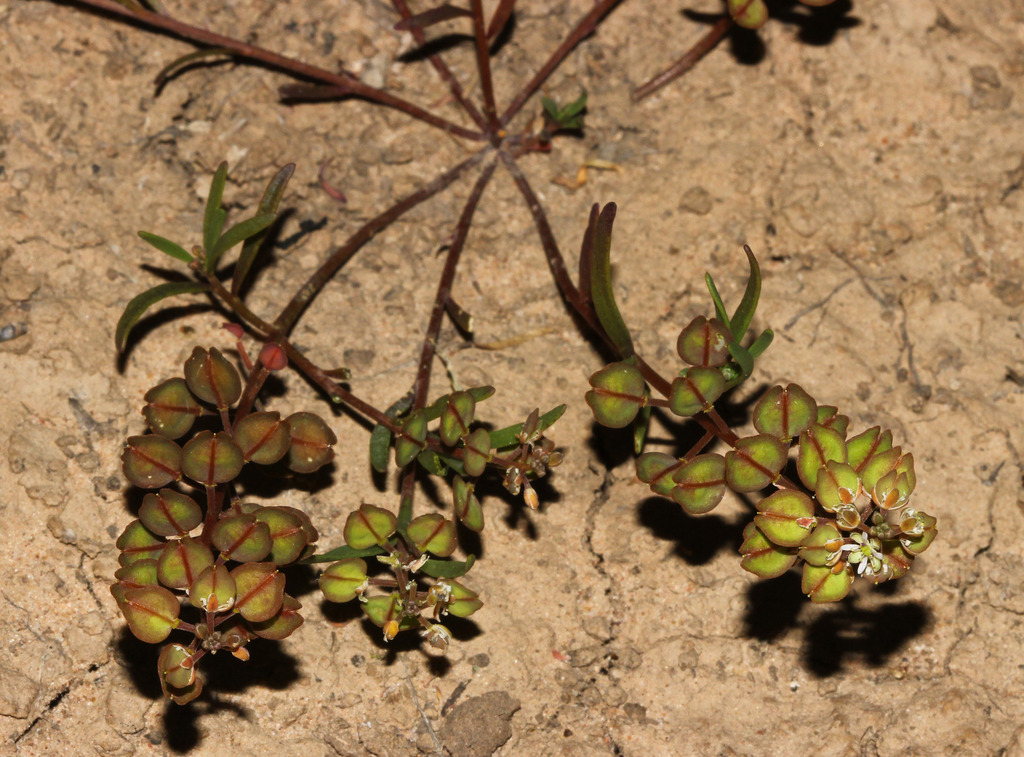

Scientific classification
- Kingdom: Plantae
- Clade: Tracheophytes
- Clade: Angiosperms
- Clade: Eudicots
- Clade: Rosids
- Order: Brassicales
- Family: Brassicaceae
- Genus: Lepidium
- Species: L. hypenantion

Binomial name
- Lepidium hypenantion Hewson

= Lepidium hypenantion =

Species of flowering plant

Lepidium hypenantion is a species of flowering plant in the mustard family which is native to Australia.

It was first described in 1982 by Helen Joan Hewson.

It is found eastern edge of the central western plains of New South Wales.
