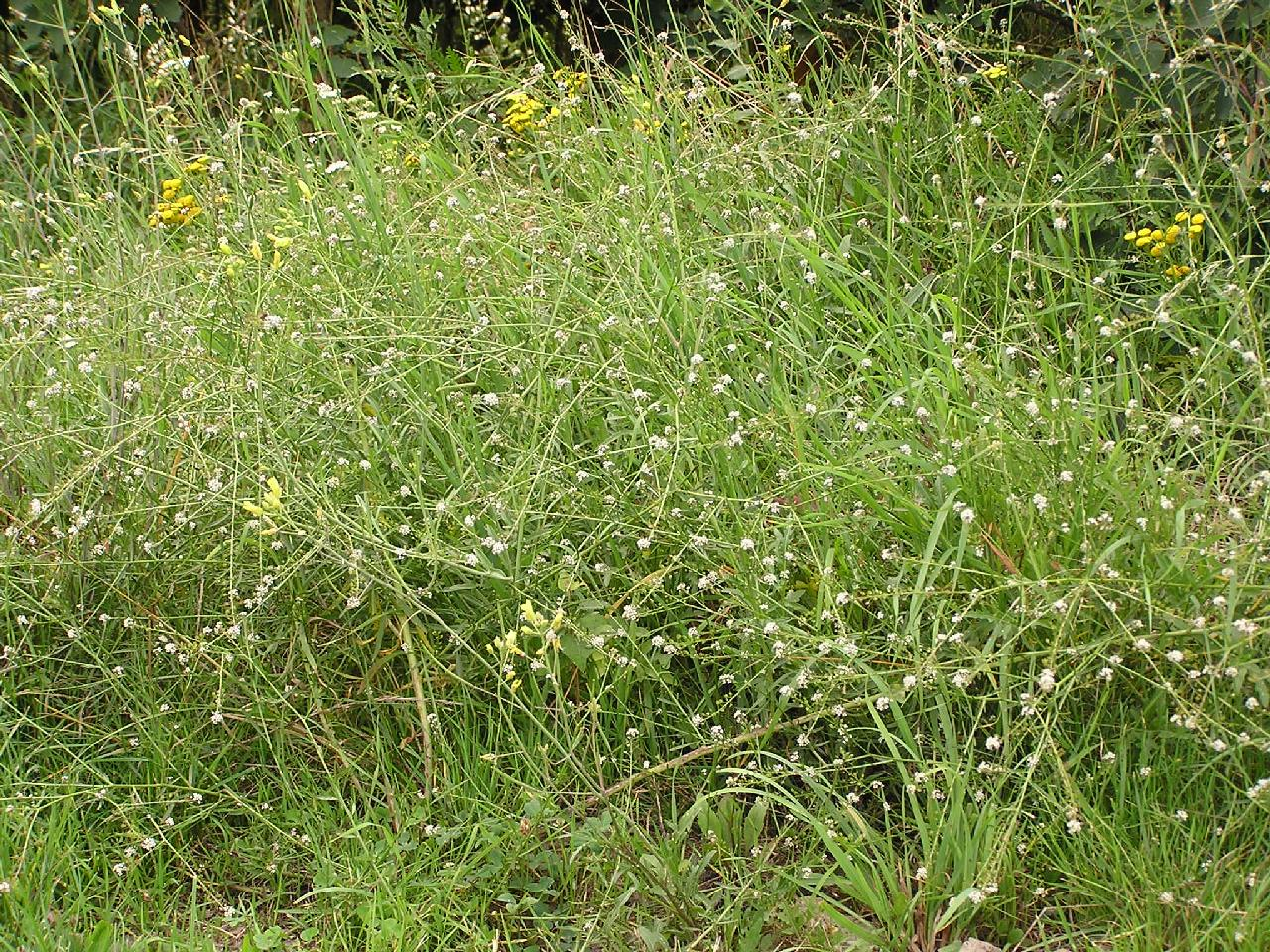

Scientific classification
- Kingdom: Plantae
- Clade: Tracheophytes
- Clade: Angiosperms
- Clade: Eudicots
- Clade: Rosids
- Order: Brassicales
- Family: Brassicaceae
- Genus: Lepidium
- Species: L. graminifolium

Binomial name
- Lepidium graminifolium L.

= Lepidium graminifolium =

Species of plant

Lepidium graminifolium, the grassleaf pepperweed or tall pepperwort, is a species of annual herb in the family Brassicaceae. They have a self-supporting growth form and simple, broad leaves. Flowers are visited by Ruiziella luctuosa. Individuals can grow to 51 cm tall.

== Sources ==
This article incorporates text from a free content work. Licensed under CC0 (license statement/permission). Text taken from Lepidium graminifolium. Encyclopedia of Life.
