= Lepidium medocinense =

Scientific classification
- Kingdom: Plantae
- Clade: Tracheophytes
- Clade: Angiosperms
- Clade: Eudicots
- Clade: Rosids
- Order: Brassicales
- Family: Brassicaceae
- Genus: Lepidium
- Species: L. medocinense

Binomial name
- Lepidium medocinense (Hauman) Al-Shehbaz (2021)

Synonyms
- Lithodraba mendocinensis (Hauman) Boelcke (1951); Xerodraba mendocinensis Hauman (1918)

Species of flowering plant

Lepidium medocinense is a species of flowering plant belonging to the family Brassicaceae. It is a subshrub native to Mendoza and Neuquén provinces of northern Argentina.
