= Lepidium ecuadoriense =

Conservation status
- Vulnerable (IUCN 3.1)

Scientific classification
- Kingdom: Plantae
- Clade: Tracheophytes
- Clade: Angiosperms
- Clade: Eudicots
- Clade: Rosids
- Order: Brassicales
- Family: Brassicaceae
- Genus: Lepidium
- Species: L. ecuadoriense

Binomial name
- Lepidium ecuadoriense Thell.

Species of flowering plant

Lepidium ecuadoriense is a species of flowering plant in the family Brassicaceae, found only in Ecuador. Its natural habitat is a subtropical or tropical high-altitude grassland and is threatened by habitat loss.
