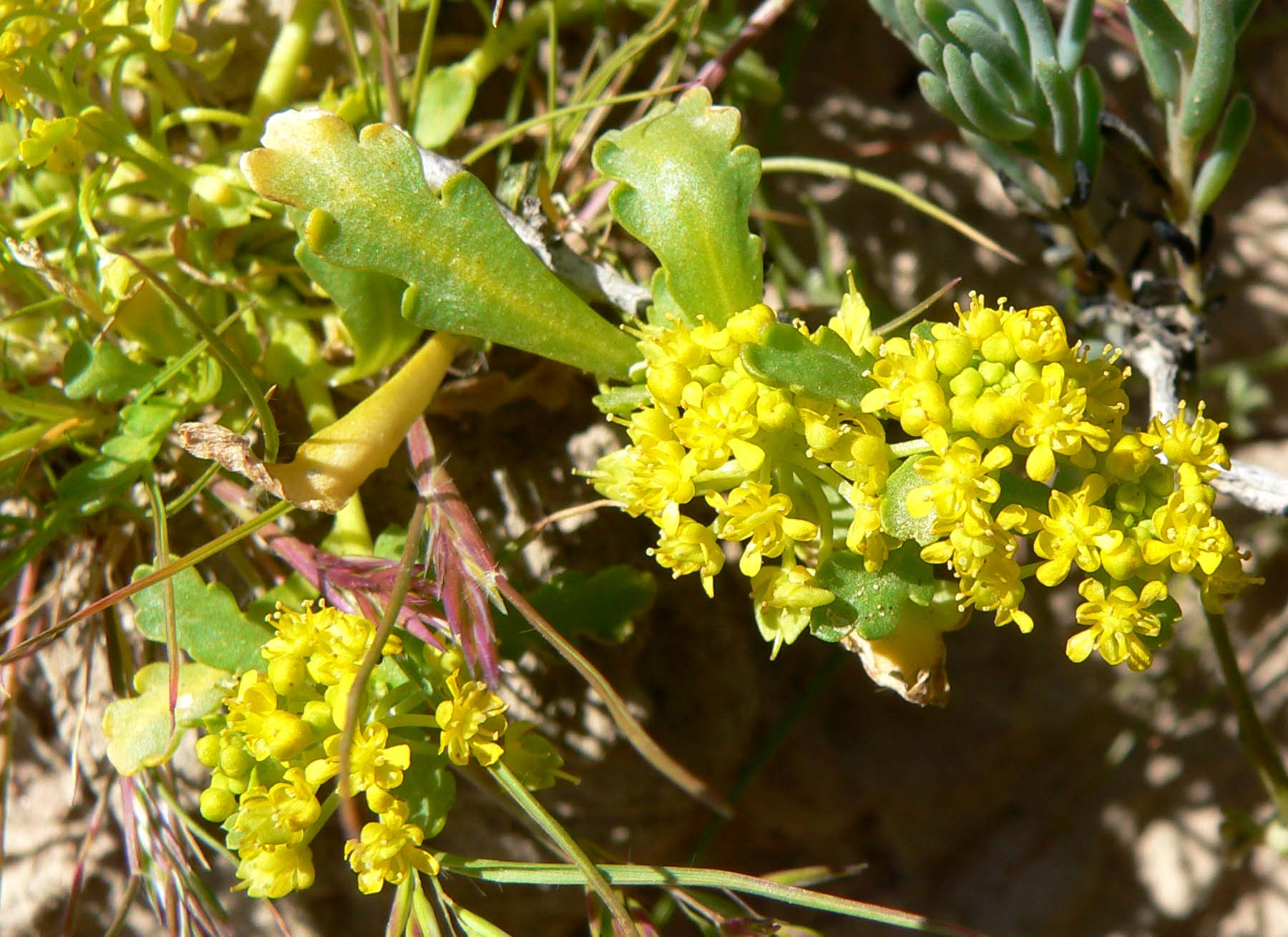

Scientific classification
- Kingdom: Plantae
- Clade: Tracheophytes
- Clade: Angiosperms
- Clade: Eudicots
- Clade: Rosids
- Order: Brassicales
- Family: Brassicaceae
- Genus: Lepidium
- Species: L. flavum

Binomial name
- Lepidium flavum Torr.

= Lepidium flavum =

Species of flowering plant

Lepidium flavum is a species of flowering plant in the mustard family known by the common name yellow pepperweed. It is native to California, Nevada, and Baja California, where it grows in the Sonoran and Mojave Deserts. The species epithet flavum is Latin for yellow and indicates its flower colour.

== Description ==
Lepidium flavum is a short, mostly prostrate annual herb producing a branching stem up to about 40 centimeters tall when growing upright. The fleshy lobed or toothed leaves grow in a basal rosette at ground level and along the stem, the lowest and longest reaching a few centimeters long. The plant blooms in inflorescences of many small flowers, each with yellow petals just a few millimeters long and six stamens at the center. The fruit is a rounded, winged, flattened capsule containing tiny seeds.
