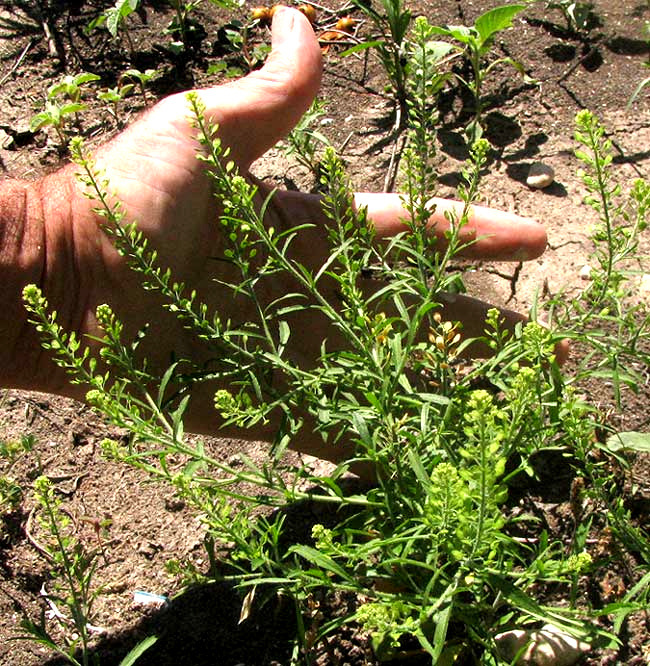
- Plant in habitat
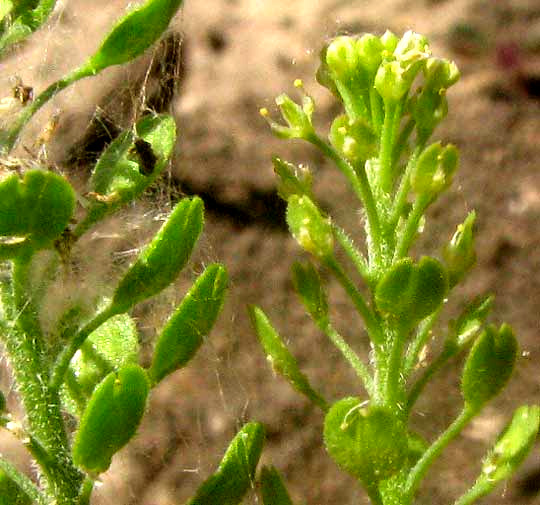
- Flowers & fruits

Scientific classification
- Kingdom: Plantae
- Clade: Tracheophytes
- Clade: Angiosperms
- Clade: Eudicots
- Clade: Rosids
- Order: Brassicales
- Family: Brassicaceae
- Genus: Lepidium
- Species: L. austrinum

Binomial name
- Lepidium austrinum Small

Synonyms
- Lepidium austrinum var. conspicuiflorum Thell. (1912); Lepidium austrinum var. orbiculare Thell. (1906); Lepidium lasiocarpum var. orbiculare (Thell) C.L. Hitchc. (1945)

= Lepidium austrinum =

Species of flowering plant

Lepidium austrinum, the southern pepperweed or southern pepperwort, is a species of flowering plant in the family Brassicaceae.

== Description ==
Lepidium austrinum is an herbaceous plant whose leaves early in life form a rosette, but later the stem branches from the base. Under ideal conditions it may reach up to 94 cm (37 inches) in height, and it can behave either as an annual or a biennial. Its stem leaves may be much longer than wide, with the widest portion near the tip, to very narrow. Leaf margins may be smooth to toothed, with leaves at the base deeply lobed. Its very small flowers are white, or sometimes the flowers bear no petals. The fruits are flattened, somewhat rounded in shape, and each bears a conspicuous notch at its tip. One feature distinguishing this species from many other Lepidium species is that its green parts are covered with stiff, moderately long hairs.

== Range ==
The native area of distribution for Lepidium austrinum is from the central to east-central USA south through the northeastern quarter of Mexico.

== Habitat ==
Lepidium austrinum occurs in open and disturbed areas with sandy to loamy soils.

== Ecology ==
A study of the effects of plant secondary compounds, or secondary metabolites, on the food supply of white-tailed deer in the Tamaulipan thorn scrub of northern Mexico (also known as the "Tamaulipan Mezquital" and "Brush Country") found Lepidium austrinum to be consumed by deer in the spring. The plant's "dry matter digestibility" was found to be 65.6% -- about average among the forbs consumed. Its total nitrogen – an indicator for protein content – was 2.4g per 100g^{−1} dry matter.

Several species of birds feed on the fruit pods.

== Uses ==
The round seedpods of Lepidium austrinum can add a peppery flavor to salads.

== Etymology ==
Possibly the genus name Lepidium by Linnaeus originates from the similar plant named Lepidium latifolium by Pliny the Elder (AD 23/24 – 79, long before Linnaeus), which he based on the Greek lepis, for "scale" -- in reference to the vaguely scale-like fruits. However, one wonders about the Latin lepidus, describing something that's pleasant, fine, elegant or neat, which could describe the fruits'peppery taste.

The species name austrinum is from Latin meaning "southern, south."
