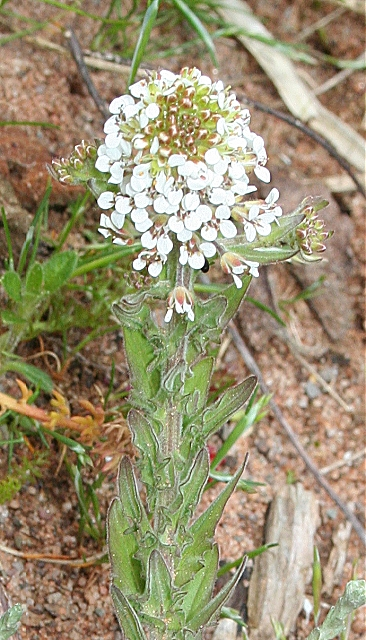

Conservation status
- Least Concern (IUCN 3.1)

Scientific classification
- Kingdom: Plantae
- Clade: Tracheophytes
- Clade: Angiosperms
- Clade: Eudicots
- Clade: Rosids
- Order: Brassicales
- Family: Brassicaceae
- Genus: Lepidium
- Species: L. heterophyllum

Binomial name
- Lepidium heterophyllum Benth.

Synonyms
- Crucifera lepidioides E.H.L.Krause; Lepidium corrigioliforme Pau; Lepidium smithii Hook.; Thlaspi heterophyllum DC.

= Lepidium heterophyllum =

Species of plant

Lepidium heterophyllum (Smith's cress or Smith's pepperwort) is a species of flowering plant in the mustard family which is native to parts of western Europe, growing in shingle banks, wasteland or cultivated fields.

== Description ==
Lepidium heterophyllum is similar in form to native Lepidium campestre and especially at the early seedling stage, both have been misidentified in Belgium.

It is a perennial, which can grow between 10–90 cm (3.9–35.4 in) tall. The hirsute (or hairy) stems, are often branched from the base, It has grey-green foliage, that has narrowly triangular, variably toothed, stem leaves which cling to the stem with long pointed auricles. The stem leaves can grow up to 50 mm long. The basal leaves are different, they have long stalks and are strap-shape, or oblong-elliptic. They can often have 1-3 pairs of small but broad sided lobes, they quickly fade at blooming time but can re-grow as the plant goes to seed. It blooms between May and August, or between May and September, in the UK, and between May and July in the US. The very small flowers (2–3.6 mm (0.079–0.142 in) long,) are on short stalks at right angles to the stem, the plant can have several crowded, parallel-sided flower spikes. The white spatulate (spoon-shaped) petals, are as long as the oblong sepals. and 6 styles, which have a notch. The flower also has stamens with violet anthers. After it has flowered, it produces a fruit capsule, which is oval and smooth, with a distinctive beak at the top. They are (4.5–8.6 mm (0.18–0.34 in) long, and inside are ovoid dark brown seeds.

== Phytochemistry ==
It was found after a phylogenetic analysis of the DNA of many species of 'Lepidium', that Lepidium heterophyllum, Lepidium hirtum, Lepidium campestre, and Lepidium perfoliatum formed a monophyletic group.

It has been used in experiments growing in soils high in copper content, to determine if the plant could be used to help clean contaminated soils.

== Taxonomy ==
It was published and described by George Bentham in 'Cat. Pl. Pyrénées' on page 95 in 1826.

It has one known subspecies; Lepidium heterophyllum subsp. rifanum (Emb. & Maire) J.M.Monts.

The specific epithet heterophyllum, refers to the Greek for 'different leaves'.

It has a few common names including 'Smith's cress' and 'Smith's pepperwort', this is due to the plant once being named Lepidium smithii, by Sir William Hooker, in honour of the botanist, Sir James Edward Smith. This name is now regarded as a synonym. It is also known in the US, as 'purple antherfield pepperwort' The pepperwort name came from plant looking like a 'pepperwort' (Lepidium campestre or other Lepidium species).

== Distribution and habitat ==
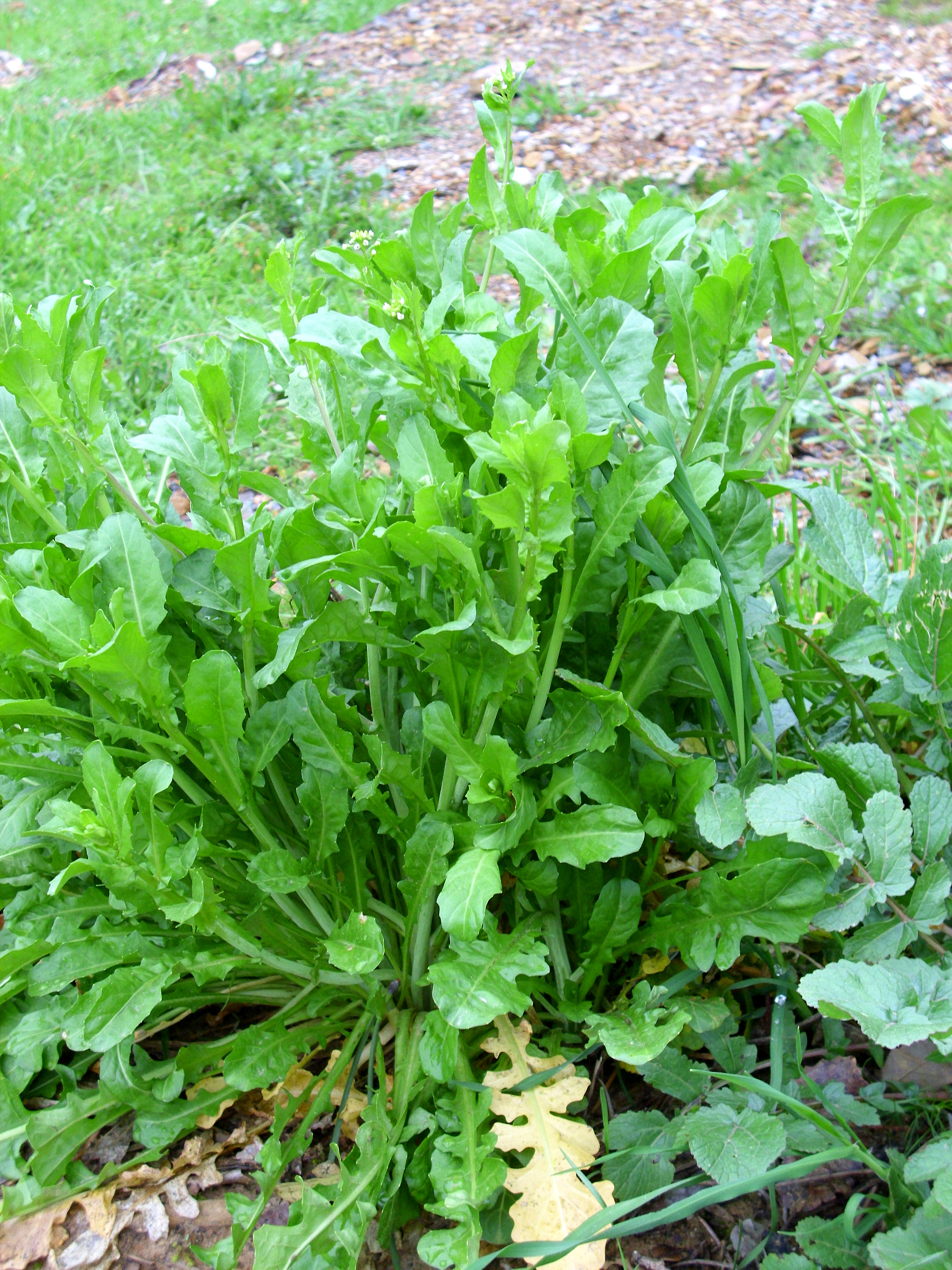
Plant seen in Sierra Madrona, Spain

Lepidium heterophyllum is native to temperate areas of western Europe.

=== Range ===
It is found in Europe within Denmark, France, Germany, Ireland, the Netherlands, Portugal, Spain and the United Kingdom.

It is also widely naturalised in other parts of Europe such as Belgium, the Czech Republic, Finland, Norway and Sweden. As well as Canada, Chile and the United States. It has been recorded as found in British Columbia, Newfoundland and Labrador, California, Colorado, Maine, Massachusetts, New York (state), Oregon, Pennsylvania and Washington (state). The records from Maine and Massachusetts are based on old plant collections, and it is not fully known if the plant has become established as part of the weedy flora of those states. In Belgium, it was first recorded in fallow fields between 1881 and 1884 in Egenhoven, and then in 1886 near Bouillon. Later, it was observed in Stokt (in the province of Limburg, Netherlands), in the 19th century. Recently, in 2004 and 2005, it was recorded on gravelly riverbanks of River Maas (which rises in France and flowing through Belgium and the Netherlands to the North Sea).

=== Habitat ===
It is found growing in acidic soils, on hillsides, in shingle, railway ballast and embankments, and, occasionally, in arable fields.

It is normally found at altitudes of 0–425 m (0–1,394 ft) above sea level.

== Conservation ==
Populations of Lepidium heterophyllum currently are stable, but it seems to be decreasing in S.E. England.

== Other sources ==
- Al-Shehbaz, I. A. 2010. A synopsis of the South American Lepidium (Brassicaceae) (Darwiniana) 48:141-167.
- Botanical Society of the British Isles BSBI taxon database (on-line resource). (BSBI)
- FNA Editorial Committee Flora of North America. 1993- (F NAmer)
- Greuter, W. et al., eds. Med-Checklist. 1984- (L Medit)
- Jalas, J. & J. Suominen Atlas florae europaeae. 1972- (Atlas Eur)
- Tutin, T. G. et al., eds. Flora europaea. 1964-1980 (F Eur)
