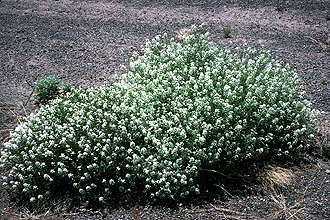

Conservation status
- Secure (NatureServe)

Scientific classification
- Kingdom: Plantae
- Clade: Tracheophytes
- Clade: Angiosperms
- Clade: Eudicots
- Clade: Rosids
- Order: Brassicales
- Family: Brassicaceae
- Genus: Lepidium
- Species: L. montanum

Binomial name
- Lepidium montanum Nutt.

Synonyms
- List: Lepidium albiflorum; Lepidium alyssoides var. jonesii; Lepidium alyssoides var. stenocarpum; Lepidium brachybotryum; Lepidium corymbosum; Lepidium crandallii; Lepidium heterophyllum; Lepidium integrifolium var. heterophyllum; Lepidium jonesii; Lepidium montanum subsp. alpinum; Lepidium montanum var. alpinum; Lepidium montanum subsp. canescens; Lepidium montanum var. canescens; Lepidium montanum subsp. cinereum; Lepidium montanum var. cinereum; Lepidium montanum f. cinereum; Lepidium montanum var. claronensis; Lepidium montanum var. coloradense; Lepidium montanum var. diffusum; Lepidium montanum subsp. glabrum; Lepidium montanum var. glabrum; Lepidium montanum subsp. heterophyllum; Lepidium montanum var. heterophyllum; Lepidium montanum subsp. jonesii; Lepidium montanum var. jonesii; Lepidium montanum var. neeseae; Lepidium montanum var. nevadense; Lepidium montanum var. owyheense; Lepidium montanum var. soliarborense; Lepidium montanum var. stellae; Lepidium montanum var. stenocarpum; Lepidium montanum subsp. tenellum; Lepidium montanum var. tenellum; Lepidium montanum var. todiltoense; Lepidium montanum subsp. typicum; Lepidium montanum var. typicum; Lepidium montanum var. wyomingense; Lepidium montanum f. wyomingense; Lepidium philonitrum; Lepidium scopulorum; Lepidium scopulorum f. canescens; Lepidium scopulorum f. nanum; Lepidium tenellum; Lepidium utahense; Lepidium utaviense; Nasturtium montanum

= Lepidium montanum =

Plant species in the cabbage family

Lepidium montanum is a species of flowering plant in the mustard family known by the common names mountain pepperweed, mountain peppergrass, mountain pepperwort, and mountain pepperplant. It is native to western North America from Oregon to Montana to northern Mexico, where it can be found in a number of habitats, often on salty or gravelly soils. There are several varieties, many of which are difficult to distinguish.

== Description ==
This is a short, spreading, shrublike biennial herb producing a rounded form up to about 40 centimeters tall and greater in width. The leaves near the base of the plant are up to 15 centimeters long and are divided into several toothed lobes; those further up on the stem are shorter and often undivided. The plant flowers abundantly in rounded to cylindrical inflorescences a few centimeters wide. Each small flower has white to cream-colored petals about 2 millimeters long and two to six stamens. The fruit is an oval-shaped capsule a few millimeters long.

== Taxonomy ==
Lepidium montanum was scientifically described and named in 1838 by Thomas Nuttall. It is part of the genus Lepidium which is classified in the Brassicaceae family. According to both Plants of the World Online (POWO) and the Flora of North America it has no accepted varieties, however the Natural Resource Conservation Service (NRCS) lists twelve varieties of the species.

- Lepidium montanum var. alpinum – Endemic to Utah
- Lepidium montanum var. canescens – Southwestern US and Oregon
- Lepidium montanum var. cinereum – Southwestern US
- Lepidium montanum var. claronense – Endemic to Utah
- Lepidium montanum var. coloradense – Endemic to Colorado
- Lepidium montanum var. glabrum – Endemic to Arizona
- Lepidium montanum var. jonesii – Intermountain West
- Lepidium montanum var. montanum – Western US
- Lepidium montanum var. neeseae – Endemic to Utah
- Lepidium montanum var. nevadense – Nevada and Utah
- Lepidium montanum var. tenellum – Endemic to Colorado
- Lepidium montanum var. wyomingense – Colorado and Wyoming

According to POWO Lepidium montanum has 46 synonyms including all the varieties accepted by the NRCS and 12 species names.

Table of Synonyms
Name	Year	Notes
Lepidium albiflorum A.Nelson & P.B.Kenn.	1908	= het.
Lepidium brachybotryum Rydb.	1907	= het.
Lepidium corymbosum Hook. & Arn.	1838	= het.
Lepidium crandallii Rydb.	1907	= het.
Lepidium heterophyllum (S.Watson) M.E.Jones	1893	= het., nom. illeg. homonym. post.
Lepidium jonesii Rydb.	1902	= het.
Lepidium philonitrum A.Nelson & J.F.Macbr.	1913	= het.
Lepidium scopulorum M.E.Jones	1895	= het.
Lepidium tenellum L.O.Williams	1934	= het.
Lepidium utahense M.E.Jones	1893	= het.
Lepidium utaviense Regel	1871	= het.
Nasturtium montanum (Nutt.) Kuntze	1891	≡ hom., nom. illeg. homonym. post.
Notes: ≡ homotypic synonym; = heterotypic synonym
