= Lepidium pinnatifidum =

Scientific classification
- Kingdom: Plantae
- Clade: Tracheophytes
- Clade: Angiosperms
- Clade: Eudicots
- Clade: Rosids
- Order: Brassicales
- Family: Brassicaceae
- Genus: Lepidium
- Species: L. pinnatifidum

Binomial name
- Lepidium pinnatifidum Ledeb.

Species of flowering plant

Lepidium pinnatifidum is a species of flowering plant in the mustard family known in English by the common name featherleaf pepperweed.

== Distribution ==
The plant is native to Europe, Central Asia, and the Middle East.

It is known elsewhere as an introduced species, particularly as an invasive species in California.

== Description ==
Lepidium pinnatifidum is an annual or perennial herb growing a single erect stem up to 0.5 metres (1.6 ft) tall. The inflorescence is a raceme of tiny flowers made up mostly of millimeter-long sepals. There are usually no petals, but there occasionally appears a vestigial white petal. The fruit is a rounded, notched capsule only about 2 millimetres (0.08 in) long.
