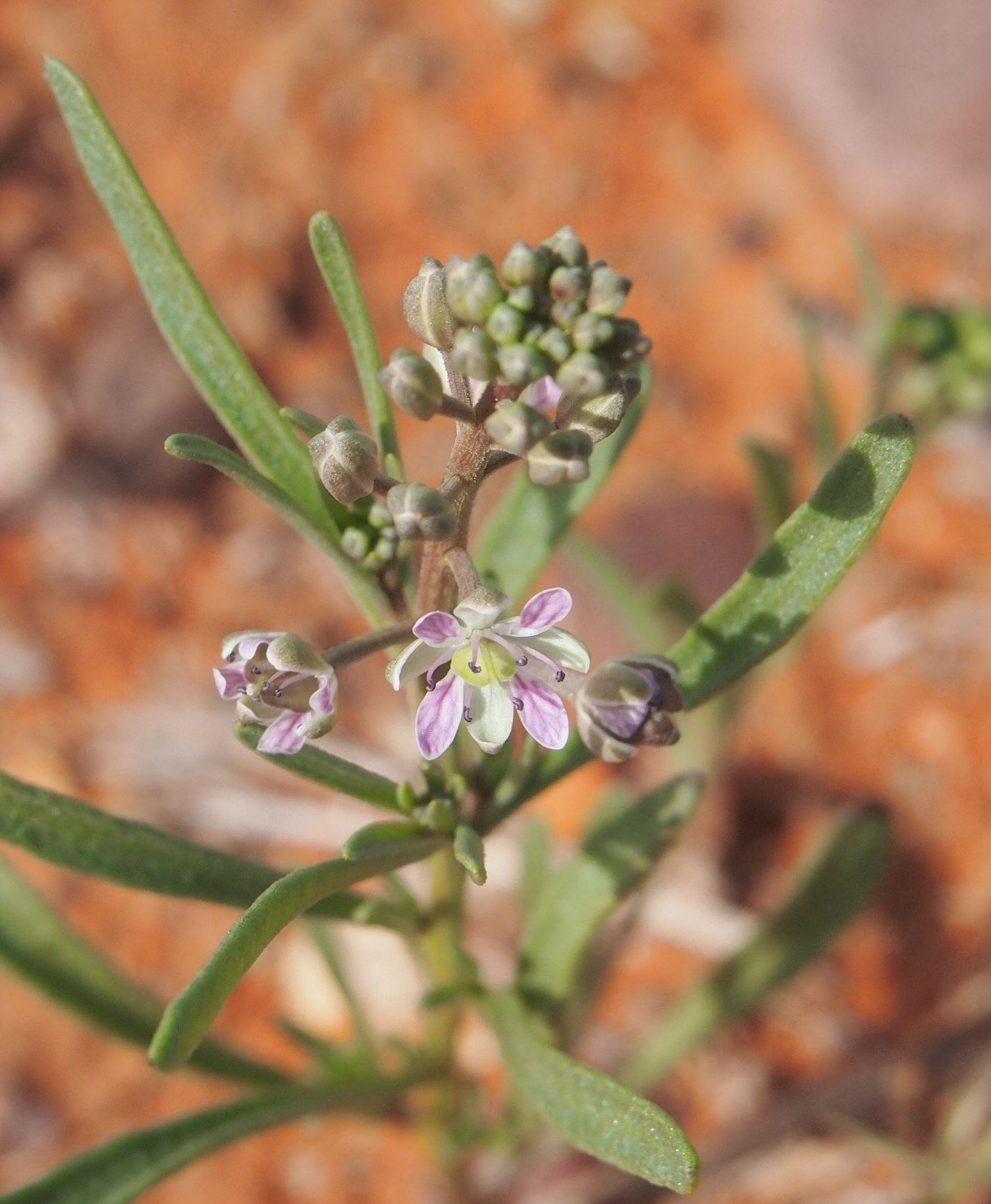

Scientific classification
- Kingdom: Plantae
- Clade: Tracheophytes
- Clade: Angiosperms
- Clade: Eudicots
- Clade: Rosids
- Order: Brassicales
- Family: Brassicaceae
- Genus: Lepidium
- Species: L. phlebopetalum

Binomial name
- Lepidium phlebopetalum F. Muell, 1960 (L.) phlebopetalum – plant

= Lepidium phlebopetalum =

Veined peppercress

Species of plant

Lepidium phlebopetalum, commonly known as veined peppercress, is a plant of the Brassicaceae family that is endemic to parts of Australia.

== Description ==
The annual or perennial herbaceous plants are 10–30 cm (3.9–11.8 in) tall or have a sprawling habitat. The leaves are leathery to succulent, lanceolate to linear, obtuse, up to 5 cm (2.0 in) long, 1–3 mm (0.039–0.118 in) wide, and alternating up the stems. At times, leaves are absent due to dry conditions.

The flowers (inflorescences) contain four petals that are white with purple veins and four sepals that are slightly shorter, in racemes, which lengthen as the fruiting bodies mature.

The fruit produced by the plant is dehiscent, meaning that it is non-fleshy. The plant has scale-like seed pods.

== Etymology ==
In the binomial name; Lepidium phlebopetalum, the genus – Lepidium, comes from the Latin word lepidium, derived from Greek lepidion, meaning 'a little scale'. This refers to the scale-shaped seed pods present on the plant. The species name, phlebopetalum, derives from the Greek words phléps, meaning "vein" (phlebo-), and pétalon, meaning "leaf", referring to its petals.

== Habitat and range ==
Lepidium phlebopetalum are often located in arid and semi-arid regions, in relatively bare sites with crusting red clay loam soils. They are found mainly in Western Australia, Northern Territory, South Australia, Queensland and New South Wales. Listed as Endangered in Victoria, there have only been some recorded sightings in the far northwest region. It becomes abundant after rain and the flowers are present most of the year depending on the region, with an influx of blooming in spring.

== History ==
Lepidium phlebopetalum was first mentioned by German-Australian botanist, Ferdinand von Mueller, in 1860.

There are 150 species of Lepidium globally. In Australia, there are 43 species, 35 of which are endemic and 8 species of which have become naturalized. Lepidium species are found in all Australian states.
