= Lepidium aretioides =

Scientific classification
- Kingdom: Plantae
- Clade: Embryophytes
- Clade: Tracheophytes
- Clade: Angiosperms
- Clade: Eudicots
- Clade: Rosids
- Order: Brassicales
- Family: Brassicaceae
- Genus: Lepidium
- Species: L. aretioides

Binomial name
- Lepidium aretioides (Hedge) Al-Shehbaz (2021)

Synonyms
- Cyphocardamum aretioides Hedge (1968)

Species of flowering plant

Lepidium aretioides is a species of flowering plant belonging to the family Brassicaceae. It is a subshrub native to eastern Afghanistan.
