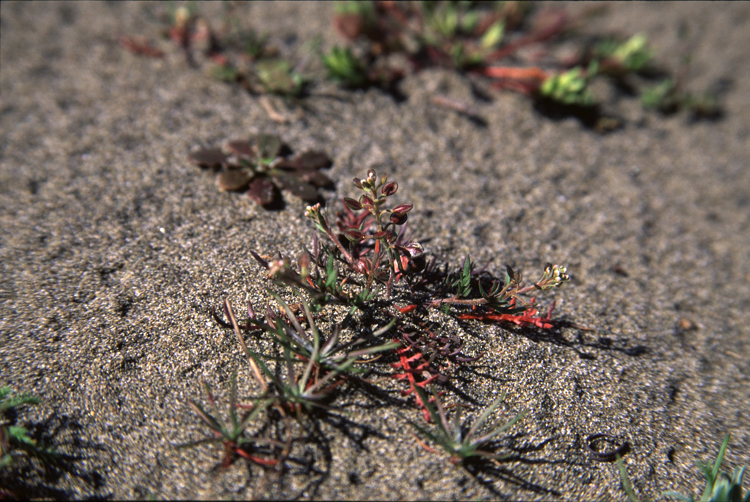

Scientific classification
- Kingdom: Plantae
- Clade: Tracheophytes
- Clade: Angiosperms
- Clade: Eudicots
- Clade: Rosids
- Order: Brassicales
- Family: Brassicaceae
- Genus: Lepidium
- Species: L. nitidum

Binomial name
- Lepidium nitidum Nutt.

= Lepidium nitidum =

Species of flowering plant

Lepidium nitidum, known by the common name shining pepperweed, is a species of flowering plant in the mustard family.

It is native to far western North America from Washington, through Nevada and California, into Baja California. It thrives in diverse habitat types.

It may be found elsewhere as an introduced species.

== Description ==
Lepidium nitidum is a mainly erect annual herb producing a slender stem up to about 40 centimeters tall. There are small leaves along the stem and larger ones at the base growing up to 10 centimeters long and divided into many narrow lobes.

At the top of the stem appear tiny flowers with spoon-shaped white petals only about a millimeter long.

The flowers give way to flattened, rounded to oval-shaped disclike fruits up to about half a centimeter long. Each green to pink shiny fruit is divided down the center into two chambers containing seeds.
