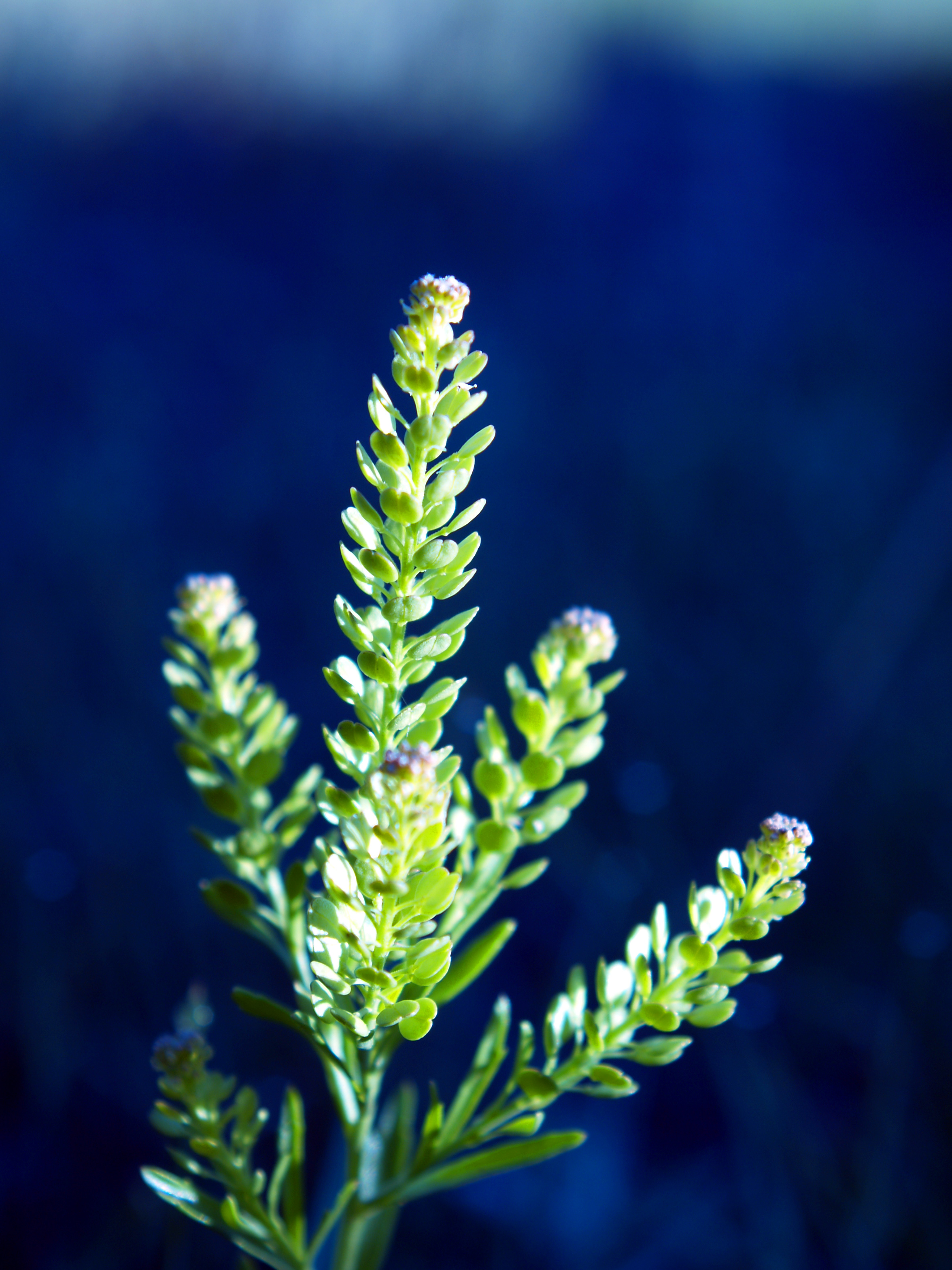

Conservation status
- Secure (NatureServe)

Scientific classification
- Kingdom: Plantae
- Clade: Tracheophytes
- Clade: Angiosperms
- Clade: Eudicots
- Clade: Rosids
- Order: Brassicales
- Family: Brassicaceae
- Genus: Lepidium
- Species: L. densiflorum

Binomial name
- Lepidium densiflorum Schrad.

= Lepidium densiflorum =

Species of flowering plant

Lepidium densiflorum is a species of flowering plant in the mustard family known by the common names common pepperweed, prairie peppergrass, elongate peppergrass, hairy-fruited peppergrass, and large-fruited peppergrass.

It is a common and widespread plant in North America, where it grows in many habitats across Canada and the United States.

== Family ==
Mustard Family – Brassicaceae (Cruciferae)

== Description ==
Lepidium densiflorum is an annual or biennial herb producing a short, erect, branching stem up to about 30 centimeters in height. Leaves grow in a basal rosette at the base of the stem and reach up to about 10 centimeters long; leaves higher up on the stem are smaller and less prominently lobed.

The plant produces raceme inflorescences of tiny flowers with sepals each only about a millimeter long. There are usually no petals, though sometimes vestigial petals appear near the sepals.

The fruit is a few millimeters long.

== History ==
The origin of Lepidium densiflorum is not entirely clear: some believe it was introduced in Europe or Eurasia, some believe it originated in western North America and east of the Mississippi River, and others believe it originated in the east. It is more likely that the species is native to North America and it was first discovered in a rubbish dump in Turku, Finland, in the early 20th century, but its distribution has expanded and it was considered a noxious and invasive herb in many states.

== Morphology ==
=== Leaves and stem ===
Basal rosette leaves, alternate, apex acute, base serrate, long stalked, with margin irregularly pinnately lobed; lower and middle cauline leaves have short stiped, margin sharply serrated, leaf blade 1-3 inches long, maximum 0.5 inches wide; upper leaves with narrow base are more linear, lobeless, sparsely serrated or subentire. Leaf hairs and erected stem are columnar pubescent.

=== Flower ===
Racemes, flowers are very small (less than 1/8 inches) but numerous and dense, elongating in fruiting stage; sepals ovate, about 1 mm long. Petals absent or reduced to filamentous, only 1/2 the length of sepals; style are very short.

=== Fruit ===
Flattened pod, fruit is obovate or broadly obovate, 2–3.5 mm long, with a shallowly notch at the tips and tip narrowly winged.

== Habitat ==
Lepidium densiflorum prefers sunny, moderate dry conditions, and fertile loamy soil, but it also can adapt to rocky or sandy soil easily. It is distributed throughout Ontario, Canada and is a very common weed growing in the cultivated land, the farms, the gardens, the sandy land, the roadsides and the waste areas.

== Growth form ==
Annual or biennial herbs. Usually, the seeds germinate in summer and form a low basal rosette leaves to winter. Flowering in the next year May to July.

== Uses ==
The seeds of Lepidium densiflorum can be used to biologically control the mosquito larvae. Additionally, the 4-HBITC and SNB extracted from Lepidium densiflorum seeds have capacity to anti the oxidicability of DPPH and -OH. Moreover, the benzylic glucosinolates system was found in Lepidium densiflorum, which is related to both plant–pathogen interactions and human health.

== Similar species ==
Shepherd’s purse and Thlaspi arvense L. (Field Pennycress or Stinkweed)

=== Distinguish Lepidium densiflorum and Thlaspi arvense L. ===
1. Stem: Field Pennycress’s stems have edges and corners; common peppergrass has no edge.

2. Flowers: The small flowers of Field Pennycress have 4 green sepals and 4 longer white petals is oblong-obovate, 2-4mm long; the 4 white petals of common peppergrass are always shorter than sepals or absent, sometimes reduced to filamentous or petalless.

3. Fruit: The fruits of Field Pennycress is nearly round or inversely ovate, 8-16mm long, flat, with broadly wings around and deep notch at the tips; the fruit of common peppergrass is obovate or broadly obovate, 2–3.5 mm long, with a small notch at the tips and tip narrowly winged.

4. Seeds: Both the seeds of Field Pennycress and common peppergrass are divided into 2 Chambers. There are 2-8 seeds in each chamber in Field Pennycress while only one seed in each chamber in common peppergrass, so this is the best way to identify two species.
