= Lepidium aschersonii =

Conservation status
- Vulnerable (EPBC Act)

Scientific classification
- Kingdom: Plantae
- Clade: Tracheophytes
- Clade: Angiosperms
- Clade: Eudicots
- Clade: Rosids
- Order: Brassicales
- Family: Brassicaceae
- Genus: Lepidium
- Species: L. aschersonii

Binomial name
- Lepidium aschersonii Thell.

Species of plant

Lepidium aschersonii, also known as spiny peppercress, is a species of plant in the cabbage family. It is native to mainland southern Australia.

== Description ==
The species grows as a perennial herb up to about 30 cm in height. It has intricately branched stems; the smaller branches are spiny, and the whole plant becomes spinier with increasing age and aridity. The leaves may be up to 12 cm long at the base of the plant, but smaller higher up the stem. The inflorescence is an inconspicuous greenish raceme terminating in a spine. The flowers are less than a millimetre long. The fruits are oval pods 3.5–4.5 cm long by 2.5–3 cm wide.

== Distribution and habitat ==
The species is found in New South Wales and Victoria, with an isolated population in Western Australia. It occurs around swamps and saltmarshes on heavy soils which are regularly waterlogged or flooded.

== Conservation ==
The species has declined in range and abundance since European settlement in Australia. It is threatened by invasive plants, grazing by rabbits and livestock, and altered hydrology. It has been declared Vulnerable under Australia’s EPBC Act.
