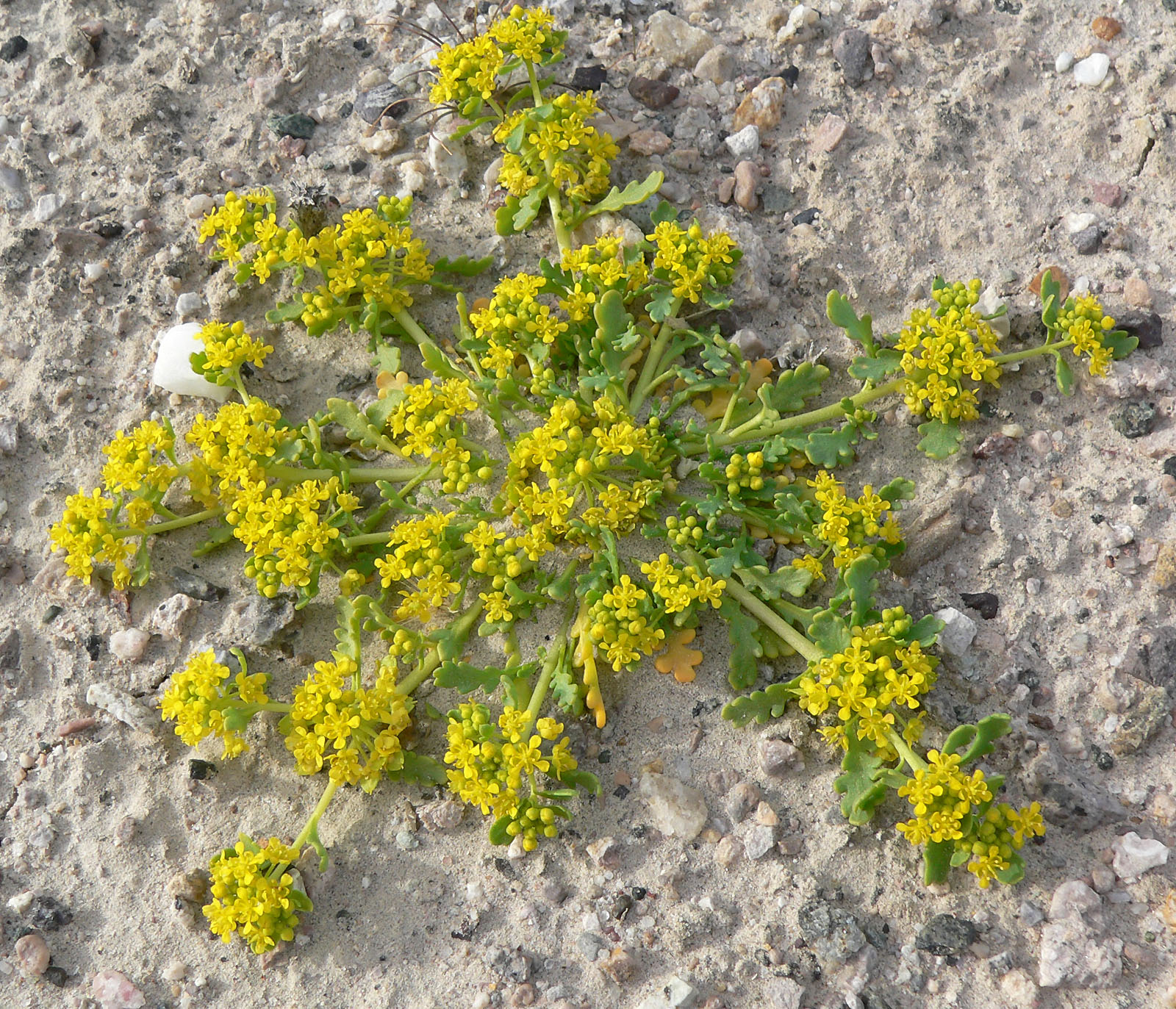
- Lepidium flavum

Scientific classification
- Kingdom: Plantae
- Clade: Embryophytes
- Clade: Tracheophytes
- Clade: Angiosperms
- Clade: Eudicots
- Clade: Rosids
- Order: Brassicales
- Family: Brassicaceae
- Genus: Lepidium; L. (1753)

Species
- 265, see text

Synonyms
- Synonymy: Carara Medik. (1792); Cardamon Fourr. (1868); Cardaria Desv. (1815); Cardiolepis Wallr. (1822); Coronopus Zinn (1757); Cotyliscus Desv. (1815); Cynocardamum Webb & Berthel. (1836); Cyphocardamum Hedge (1968); Dileptium Raf. (1817); Eudistemon Raf. (1830); Hymenophysa C.A.Mey. (1831); Iberis Hill (1756), nom. illeg.; Jundzillia Andrz. ex DC. (1821), not validly publ.; Lasioptera Andrz. ex DC. (1821); Lepia Desv. (1815); Lepicochlea Rojas (1918); Lepidiberis Fourr. (1868); Lepidion St.-Lag. (1880), orth. var.; Lithodraba Boelcke (1951); Monoploca Bunge (1845); Nasturtiastrum Gillet & Magne (1863); Nasturtioides Medik. (1792); Nasturtiolum Medik. (1792); Nasturtium Mill. (1754), nom. rej.; Neolepia W.A.Weber (1989); Papuzilla Ridl. (1916); Physolepidion Schrenk ex Fisch. & C.A.Mey. (1841); Semetum Raf. (1840); Senckenbergia G.Gaertn., B.Mey. & Scherb. (1800); Senebiera DC. (1799); Sennebiera Willd. (1809); Sprengeria Greene (1906); Stroganowia Kar. & Kir. (1841); Stubendorffia Schrenk ex Fisch. (1844); Uranodactylus Gilli (1959); Winklera Regel (1886)

= Lepidium =

Genus of flowering plants in the cabbage family

Lepidium is a genus of plants in the mustard/cabbage family, Brassicaceae. The genus is widely distributed in the Americas, Africa, Asia, Europe, and Australia. It includes familiar species such as garden cress, maca, and dittander. General common names include peppercress, peppergrass, pepperweed, and pepperwort. Some species form tumbleweeds. The genus name Lepidium is from Greek meaning 'small scale', which is thought to be derived from a folk medicine usage of the plant to treat leprosy, which cause small scales on the skin. Another meaning is related to the small scale-like fruit.

== Species ==
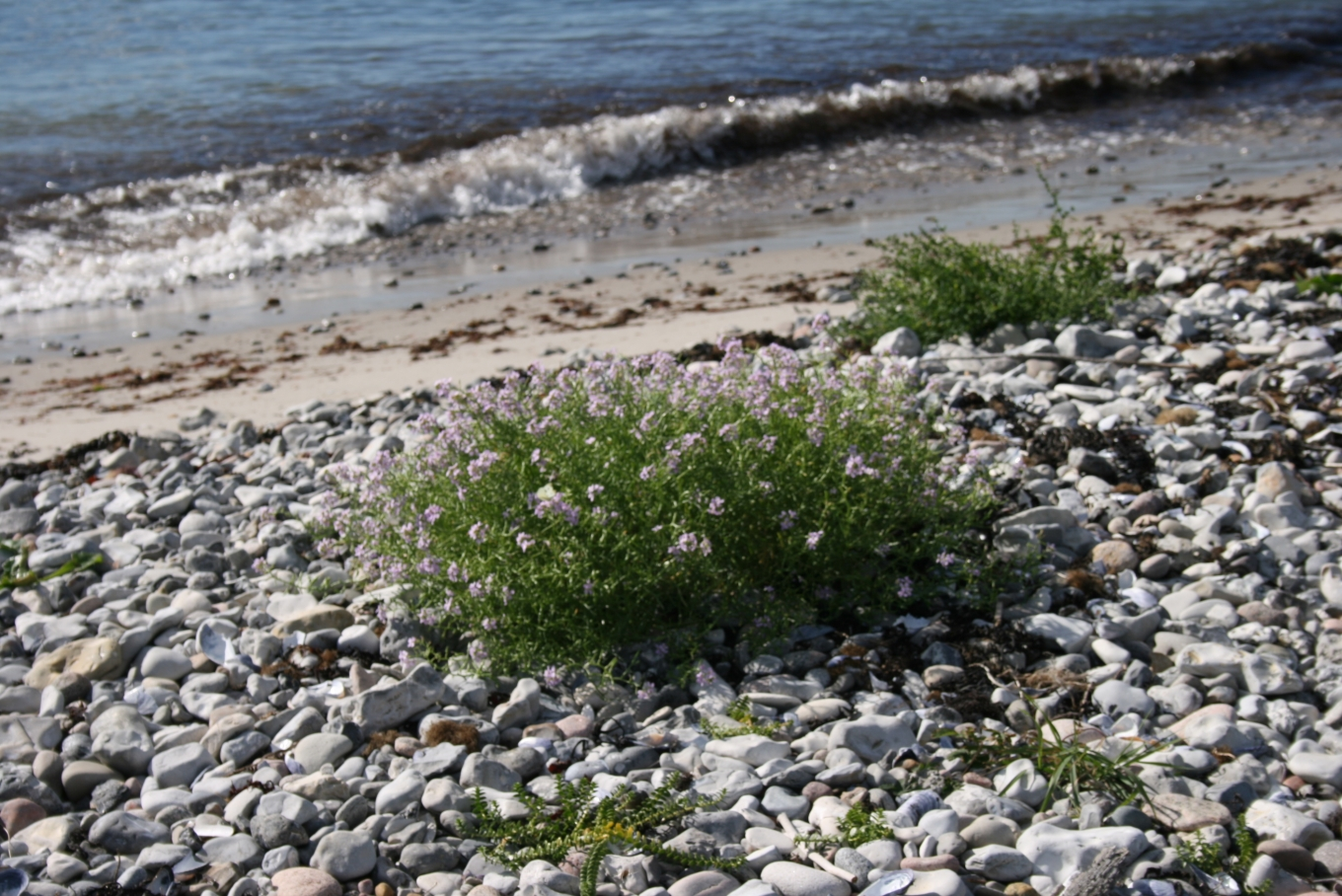
Lepidium latifolium on the Kattegat

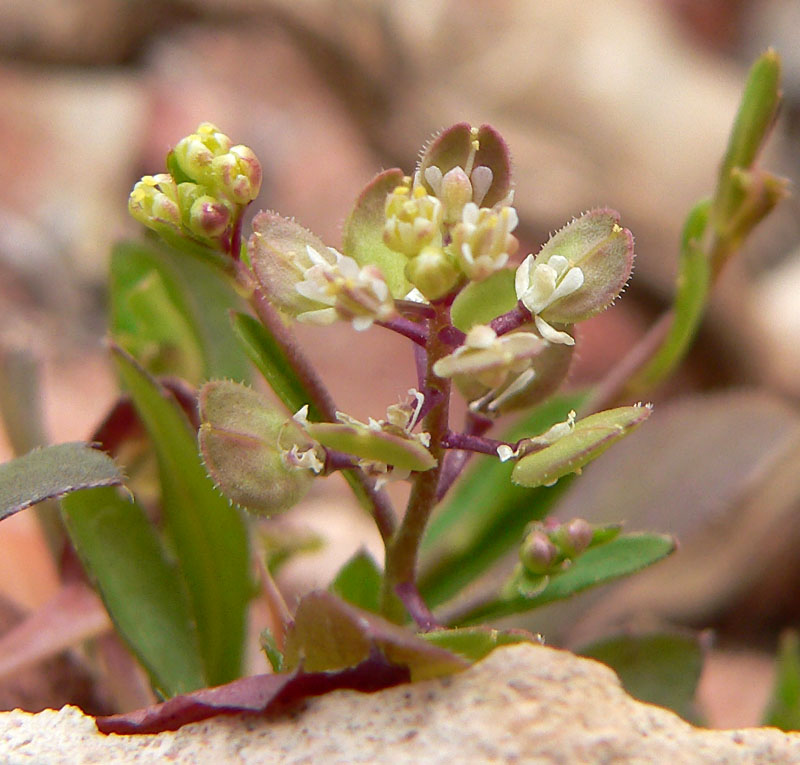
Lepidium lasiocarpum var. lasiocarpum

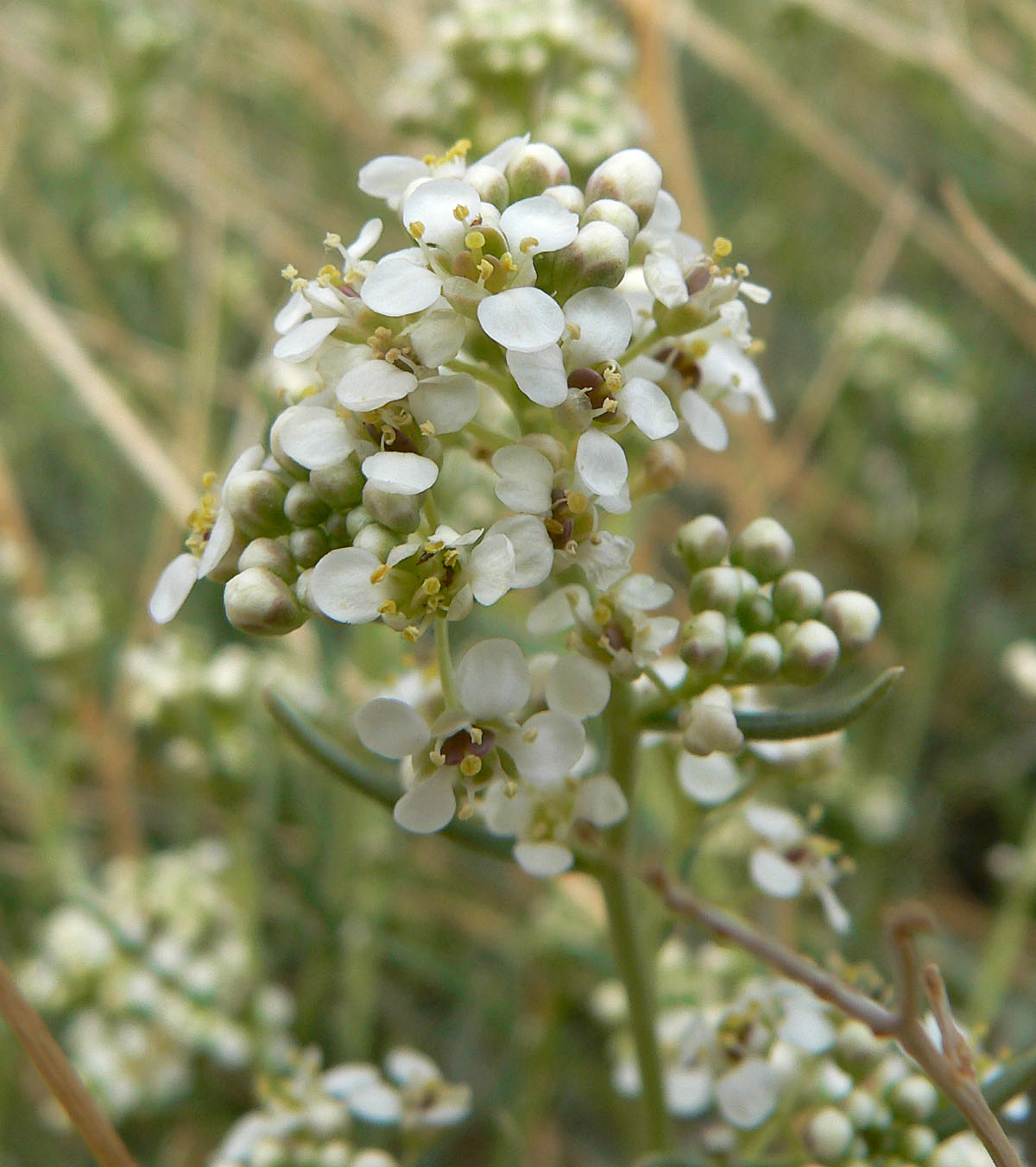
Lepidium fremontii

Plants of the World Online accepts 265 species in the genus. 10 species are found in California.

Species include:

- Lepidium africanum
- Lepidium amelum
- Lepidium amissum de Lange & Heenan – Waitakere scurvy grass (New Zealand); extinct
- Lepidium aretioides (Hedge) Al-Shehbaz
- Lepidium armoracia Fisch. & C.A. Mey. 1843
- Lepidium apetalum Willd. – du xing cai (Pinyin, China)
- Lepidium arbuscula
- Lepidium aschersonii Thell. – spiny peppercress
- Lepidium austrinum Small – Southern Pepperweed
- Lepidium banksii
- Lepidium barnebyanum
- Lepidium biplicatum
- Lepidium bonariense – peppercress
- Lepidium campestre – field pepperwort, field cress
- Lepidium catapycnon
- Lepidium coronopus – swine cress
- Lepidium davisii – Davis' peppergrass
- Lepidium densiflorum – common pepperweed
- Lepidium desvauxii – bushy peppercress
- Lepidium dictyotum
- Lepidium didymum
- Lepidium draba – hoary cress
- Lepidium drummondii
- Lepidium echinatum
- Lepidium ecuadoriense
- Lepidium englerianum
- Lepidium fasciculatum – bundled peppercress
- Lepidium flavum
- Lepidium flexicaule
- Lepidium foliosum – leafy peppercress
- Lepidium fremontii – desert pepperweed
- Lepidium genistoides
- Lepidium ginninderrense
- Lepidium graminifolium
- Lepidium howei-insulae – mustard & cress
- Lepidium hypenantion
- Lepidium hyssopifolium
- Lepidium heterophyllum – Smith's pepperwort, Smith's cress
- Lepidium jaredii – Jared's pepperweed
- Lepidium lasiocarpum
- Lepidium latifolium – pepperweed, dittander
- Lepidium latipes
- Lepidium lyratogynum
- Lepidium merrallii
- Lepidium medocinense (Hauman) Al-Shehbaz
- Lepidium meyenii (syn. L. peruvianum) – maca
- Lepidium monoplocoides – winged peppercress
- Lepidium montanum – western pepperweed, mountain pepperweed
- Lepidium nanum – dwarf pepperweed
- Lepidium nesophilum
- Lepidium nitidum – shining pepperweed
- Lepidium oblongum
- Lepidium oleraceum – Cook's scurvy grass (near extinct)
- Lepidium oxycarpum – forked pepperweed
- Lepidium oxytrichum
- Lepidium papilliferum – slickspot peppergrass
- Lepidium papillosum – warty peppercress
- Lepidium pedicellosum
- Lepidium peregrinum
- Lepidium perfoliatum
- Lepidium peruvianum
- Lepidium phlebopetalum
- Lepidium pholidogynum
- Lepidium pinnatifidum
- Lepidium platypetalum – slender peppercress
- Lepidium pseudohyssopifolium
- Lepidium pseudoruderale
- Lepidium pseudotasmanicum
- Lepidium puberulum
- Lepidium quitense
- Lepidium rotundum – veined peppercress
- Lepidium ruderale – narrow-leaved pepperwort
- Lepidium sagittulatum
- Lepidium sativum – garden cress
- Lepidium scandens
- Lepidium squamatum
- Lepidium strictum
- Lepidium thurberi – Thurber's peppergrass, Thurber's pepperweed
- Lepidium virginicum – Virginia peppercress
- Lepidium xylodes

== See also ==
- Everitt, J.H.; Lonard, R.L.; Little, C.R. (2007). Weeds in South Texas and Northern Mexico. Lubbock: Texas Tech University Press. ISBN 0-89672-614-2
- "Lepidium". Australian Plant Name Index (APNI). Centre for Plant Biodiversity Research, Australian Government.
