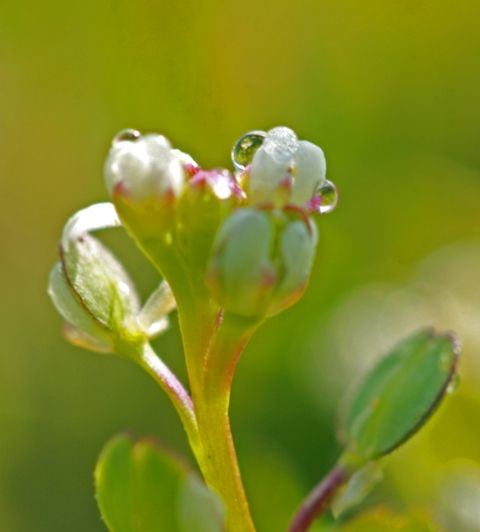

Scientific classification
- Kingdom: Plantae
- Clade: Tracheophytes
- Clade: Angiosperms
- Clade: Eudicots
- Clade: Rosids
- Order: Brassicales
- Family: Brassicaceae
- Genus: Lepidium
- Species: L. dictyotum

Binomial name
- Lepidium dictyotum A.Gray

= Lepidium dictyotum =

Species of flowering plant

Lepidium dictyotum is a species of flowering plant in the mustard family known by the common names alkali pepperweed and alkali pepperwort.

It is native to the far western United States. It grows in dry saline and alkaline soils, such as dry lakebeds.

== Description ==
Lepidium dictyotum is a hairy annual herb producing decumbent or spreading stems up to about 20 centimeters long. They are lined sparsely with small leaves divided into fingerlike lobes.

The inflorescence is a mostly erect raceme of tiny flowers. Each flower is made up of millimeter long sepals and occasionally a white petal, although the petals are usually absent.

The fruit is a dehiscent silique 3 or 4 millimeters long divided into two valves, each containing a seed.
