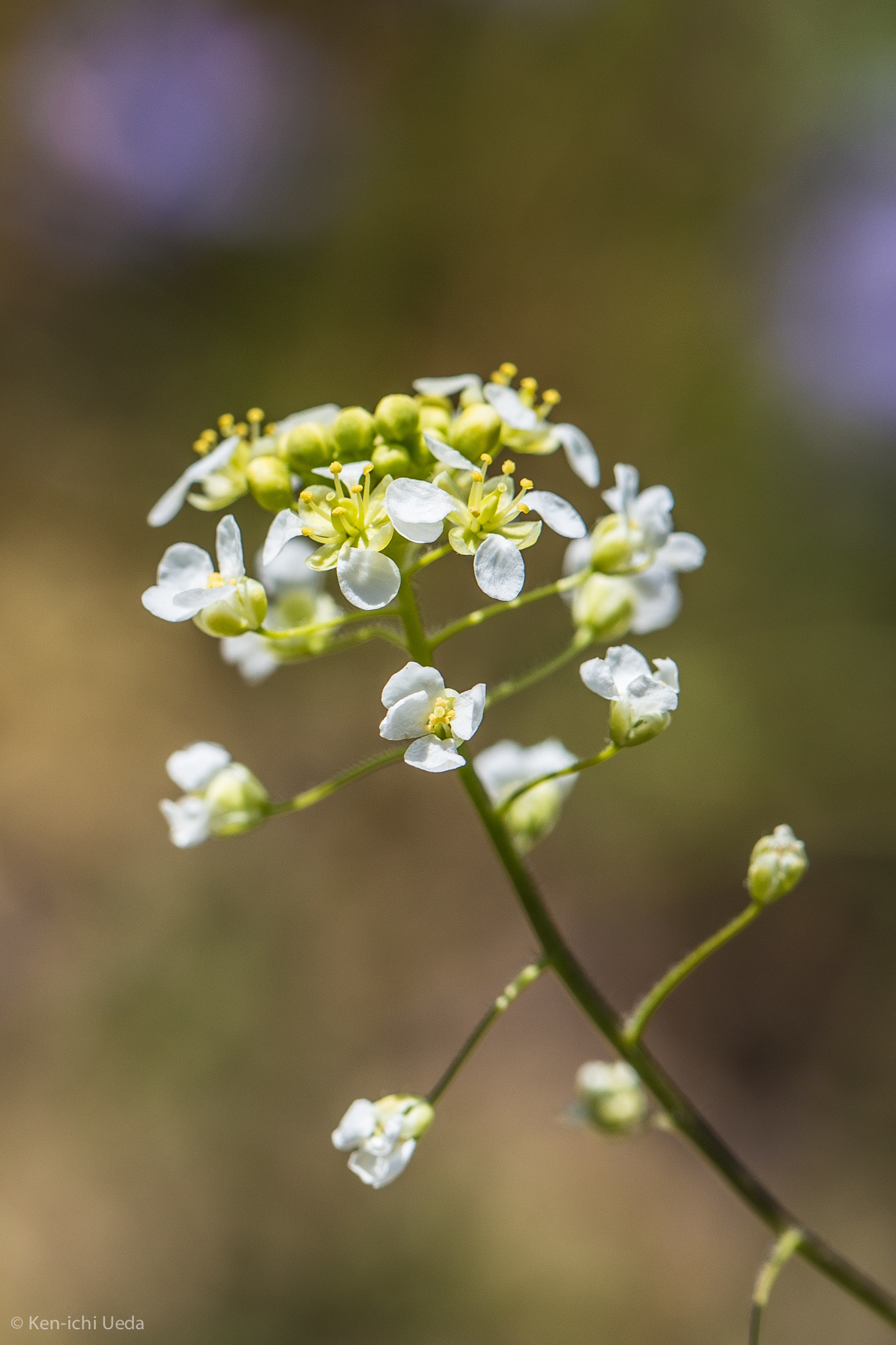
- Lepidium jaredii in the Griswold Hills

Conservation status
- Imperiled (NatureServe)

Scientific classification
- Kingdom: Plantae
- Clade: Tracheophytes
- Clade: Angiosperms
- Clade: Eudicots
- Clade: Rosids
- Order: Brassicales
- Family: Brassicaceae
- Genus: Lepidium
- Species: L. jaredii

Binomial name
- Lepidium jaredii Brandeg.

= Lepidium jaredii =

Species of flowering plant

Lepidium jaredii is a species of flowering plant in the mustard family known by the common name Jared's pepperweed. It is endemic to California, where it is known from the San Joaquin Valley to just within the central Coast Ranges.

== Description ==
Lepidium jaredii is a mustardlike annual herb growing slender, erect stems up to about 70 centimeters in maximum height. The leaves are lance-shaped and up to 10 centimeters long. There are two subspecies of the plant; ssp. jaredii, Jared's or Carrizo pepperweed, has yellow petals, whereas ssp. album, Panoche pepperweed, has white petals. Subspecies album is validly published, but not currently recognized in Jepson Manual 2.

The species appears to have a strict edaphic affinity for clay soils and particularly those with substantial gypsum and salt accumulation in the lower soil profile. For soils of ssp. album, the parent material is typically a marine shale, especially the Moreno shale formation. This soil is an extreme substrate type in which Lepidium jaredii typically dominates, relatively free of competition with other plant species. The soil is typically 3 to 5 inches of high shrink-swell clay topsoil (smectite clay; hard, cloddy when dry) over several inches of subsoil enriched in precipitated gypsum and salts (powdery when dry). The pH of the soils is typically very acidic (as low as 4.5).

Lepidium jaredii is of conservation concern as both ssp. jaredii and ssp. album have limited ranges. Subspecies jaredii is primarily restricted to Carrizo Plain and primarily at the south end of Soda Lake (Panorama Road) where there is a single very large population varying between several thousand to more than a million plants per year. The habitat is nearly level alkali sink (clay flat). The population is on land owned and protected by the Bureau of Land Management Bakersfield Field Office as Carrizo Plain National Monument. Other smaller populations occur farther north on private land near Kecks Corner in western Kern County. The habitat there is on hill slopes. Numerous widely distributed populations of ssp. album occur on hill slopes in western Fresno County and eastern San Benito County at Panoche Hills, Tumey Hills, Griswold Hills, Ciervo Hills, and Big Blue Hills. Much of its habitat is located on land owned and protected by the Bureau of Land Management Central Coast Field Office.

The southernmost known population of ssp. album is located at Oil Canyon north of the city of Coalinga, while the northernmost population of ssp. jaredii is located near Kecks Corner. There is a separation in the known range of the two subspecies of about 40 air miles.
