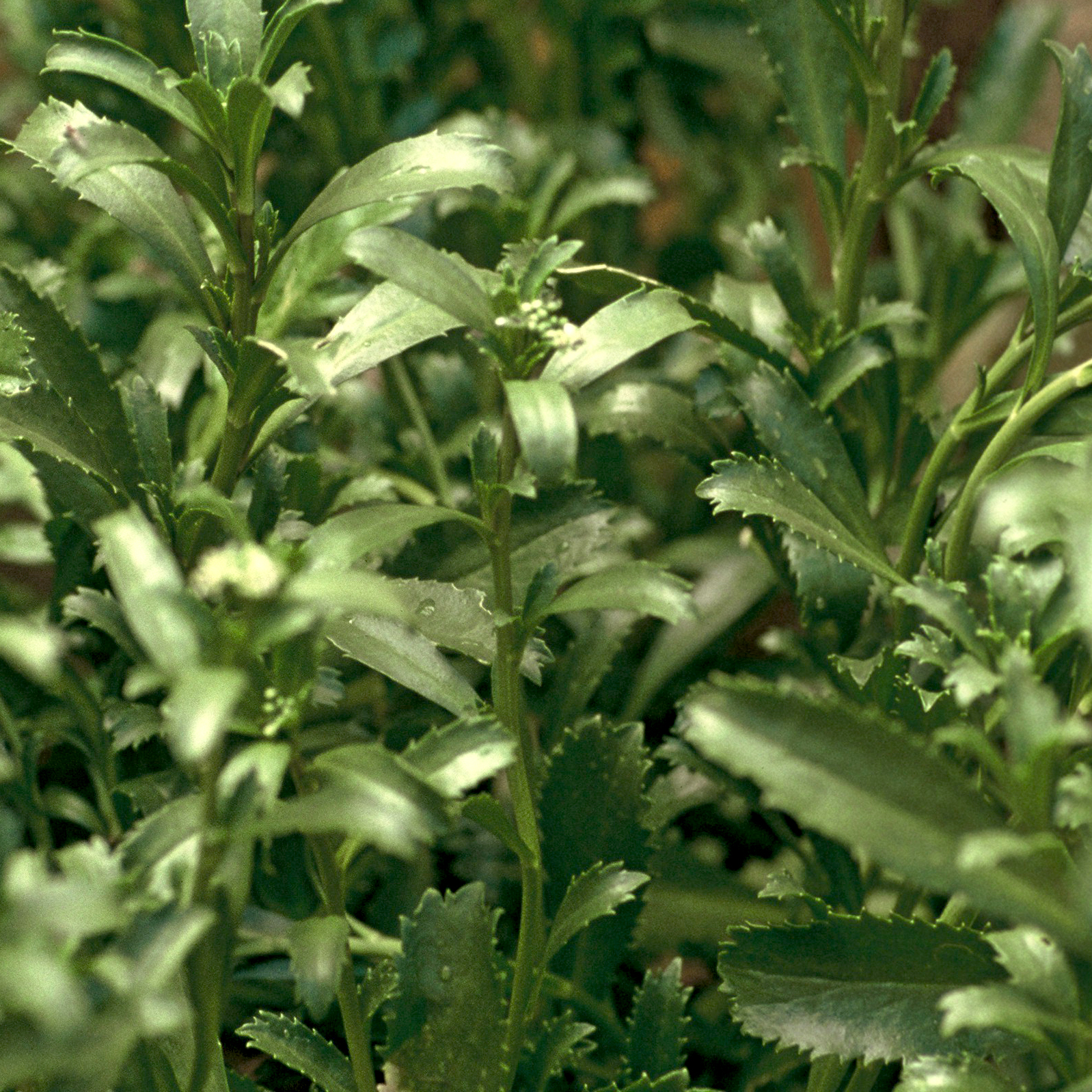
- Coastal peppercress

Conservation status
- Nationally Critical (NZ TCS)

Scientific classification
- Kingdom: Plantae
- Clade: Tracheophytes
- Clade: Angiosperms
- Clade: Eudicots
- Clade: Rosids
- Order: Brassicales
- Family: Brassicaceae
- Genus: Lepidium
- Species: L. banksii

Binomial name
- Lepidium banksii Kirk, 1899

Synonyms
- Lepidium forsteri

= Lepidium banksii =

Species of flowering plant

Lepidium banksii, known as coastal peppercress, is a rare species of flowering plant from the family Brassicaceae. It is endemic to New Zealand, formerly found around the coast of the northern South Island but now critically endangered.

== Discovery ==
Coastal peppercress was first collected for culinary purposes: by Cook, in 1770 in the Marlborough Sounds, along with its relative Lepidium oleraceum, as a treatment for scurvy. Both species are members of the Brassicaceae or cabbage family and contain vitamin C. It was collected again in 1827 by Dumont d'Urville in Queen Charlotte Sound and Astrolabe Harbour (now in Abel Tasman National Park), and from those specimens was described by Thomas Kirk in 1899 and named after Sir Joseph Banks, the naturalist on Cook's first voyage.

== Description ==
Coastal peppercress is a low rambling fleshy-leaved coastal herb. It resembles the closely related Cook's scurvy grass or nau (L. oleraceum), but is darker in colour and with more deeply toothed leaves. Its seed pods are much larger and deeply notched, and it each winter it dies back to its rootstock.

== Distribution ==
Lepidium banksii is strictly coastal, growing in boulder banks and on shell banks in estuaries. Formerly it was found in the northern South Island, from Karamea on the West Coast to Tasman and Golden Bays and the Marlborough Sounds, but by the 1950s had grown so scarce that Allan writing the Flora of New Zealand series was unable to refer to a recent specimen.

In 1988, Phil Garnock-Jones was revising the New Zealand Lepidium species, and realised that L. oleraceum specimens collected in 1961 near Tōtaranui in Abel Tasman National Park were actually L. banksii. Field surveys revealed the plant was still there. It was also discovered in the Waimea Estuary near Nelson during a survey by DOC botanist Shannel Courtney.

== Conservation ==
Lepidium banksii is the rarest of New Zealand's 11 Lepidium species. By 1991 only 22 plants were known in the wild. In 1994, a new population of about 450 was discovered in a remote cove in Abel Tasman National Park, but soon after these were all destroyed by feral pigs. The species is very vulnerable to pests and diseases, and proved to be extremely difficult to cultivate and successfully replant in the wild. A new strategy of sowing seed directly in guano-rich soils where seabirds congregated proved more fruitful, and by the mid 2000s hundreds of plants were successfully established and self-seeding. L. banksii was functionally extinct in the wild, and its entire population continues to rely on ongoing artificial propagation efforts.
