= Lepidium oxycarpum =

Scientific classification
- Kingdom: Plantae
- Clade: Tracheophytes
- Clade: Angiosperms
- Clade: Eudicots
- Clade: Rosids
- Order: Brassicales
- Family: Brassicaceae
- Genus: Lepidium
- Species: L. oxycarpum

Binomial name
- Lepidium oxycarpum Torr. & A.Gray

Species of flowering plant

Lepidium oxycarpum is a species of flowering plant in the mustard family known by the common names forked pepperweed and sharp-fruited pepperweed.

== Distribution ==
It is native to California, and it has been reported in British Columbia and one area in Washington. It grows in alkaline and saline soils and moist areas such as vernal pools and coastline.

== Description ==
Lepidium oxycarpum is a short-lived annual herb producing several erect stem branches to heights rarely exceeding 15 centimeters. The leaves are linear in shape, with those at the base up to 6 centimeters long and sometimes with narrow lobes.

The plant blooms in tiny flowers with sepals often less than a millimeter long. The flowers may or may not have white petals also up to a millimeter long.

The fruit is a two-chambered silique capsule, a few millimeters long which is oval or oblong. It has a notch at the tip forming a fork shape.
