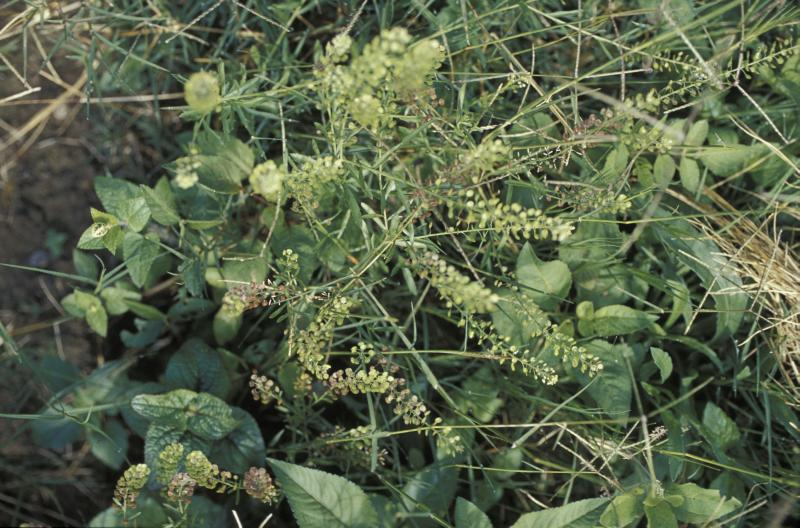

Scientific classification
- Kingdom: Plantae
- Clade: Tracheophytes
- Clade: Angiosperms
- Clade: Eudicots
- Clade: Rosids
- Order: Brassicales
- Family: Brassicaceae
- Genus: Lepidium
- Species: L. africanum

Binomial name
- Lepidium africanum (Burm.f.) DC. (1821)

Synonyms
- Lepidium africanum var. aethiopicum (Hiern) Thell. (1906); Lepidium africanum subsp. divaricatum (Aiton) Jonsell (1975); Lepidium ambiguum F.Muell. (1855); Lepidium capense Eckl. & Zeyh. (1835), nom. illeg.; Lepidium divaricatum Aiton (1789); Lepidium divaricatum subsp. linoides (Thunb.) Thell. (1906); Lepidium divaricatum var. subdentatum (Burch. ex DC.) Sond. (1859); Lepidium dubium Thell. (1906); Lepidium hyssopifolium var. tasmanicum (Thell.) Domin (1926); Lepidium iberioides Desv. (1815); Lepidium linoides Thunb. (1800); Lepidium linoides var. subdentatum (Burch. ex DC.) Sond. (1860); Lepidium ruderale var. aethiopicum Hiern (1896); Lepidium subdentatum Eckl. & Zeyh. (1835), sensu auct.; Lepidium subdentatum Burch. ex DC. (1821); Lepidium tasmanicum Thell. (1906); Nasturtium divaricatum (Aiton) Kuntze (1891); Thlaspi africanum Burm.f. (1768) (basionym); Thlaspi divaricatum (Aiton) Poir. (1806)

= Lepidium africanum =

Species of flowering plant

Lepidium africanum is a species of flowering plant belonging to the family Brassicaceae. It is an annual or perennial which ranges from Saudi Arabia and Sudan to southern Africa.
