= List of Lepidium species =

The following species in the flowering plant genus Lepidium are accepted by Plants of the World Online. Speciation in this genus is marked by allopolyploidization.

- Lepidium abrotanifolium Turcz.
- Lepidium acutidens Howell
- Lepidium aegrum Heenan & de Lange
- Lepidium affghanum Boiss.
- Lepidium affine Ledeb.
- Lepidium afghanicum (Rech.f. & Köie) Al-Shehbaz & Mumm.
- Lepidium africanum (Burm.f.) DC.
- Lepidium alashanicum H.L.Yang
- Lepidium alluaudii Maire
- Lepidium altissimum Rech.f.
- Lepidium alyssoides A.Gray
- Lepidium amelum Lepschi
- Lepidium amissum de Lange & Heenan
- Lepidium amplexicaule Willd.
- Lepidium angolense Jonsell
- Lepidium angustissimum Phil.
- Lepidium apetalum Willd.
- Lepidium appelianum Al-Shehbaz
- Lepidium apterum (Lipsky) Al-Shehbaz & Mumm.
- Lepidium arbuscula Hillebr.
- Lepidium arequipa Al-Shehbaz
- Lepidium aretioides (Hedge) Al-Shehbaz
- Lepidium argentinum Thell.
- Lepidium armoracium Fisch. & C.A.Mey.
- Lepidium aschersonii Thell.
- Lepidium aucheri Boiss.
- Lepidium auriculatum Regel & Körn.
- Lepidium austrinum Small
- Lepidium banksii Kirk
- Lepidium barnebyanum Reveal
- Lepidium basuticum Marais
- Lepidium beamanii Rollins
- Lepidium beckii Al-Shehbaz
- Lepidium bidentatum Montin
- Lepidium bipinnatifidum Desv.
- Lepidium bipinnatum Thunb.
- Lepidium biplicatum Hewson
- Lepidium boelckeanum Prina
- Lepidium boelckei Al-Shehbaz
- Lepidium bonariense L.
- Lepidium botschantsevianum Al-Shehbaz
- Lepidium botschantzevii (R.M.Vinogr.) Al-Shehbaz & Mumm.
- Lepidium brachyotum (Kar. & Kir.) Al-Shehbaz
- Lepidium bupleuroides Rech.f.
- Lepidium burkartii Boelcke
- Lepidium buschianum Al-Shehbaz
- Lepidium caespitosum Desv.
- Lepidium campestre (L.) W.T.Aiton
- Lepidium capense Thunb.
- Lepidium capitatum Hook.f. & Thomson
- Lepidium cardamine L.
- Lepidium cardiophyllum (Pavlov) Al-Shehbaz
- Lepidium cartilagineum (J.Mayer) Thell.
- Lepidium castellanum de Lange & Heenan
- Lepidium catapycnon Hewson
- Lepidium chalepense L.
- Lepidium chichicara Desv.
- Lepidium cordatum Willd. ex Steven
- Lepidium coronopifolium Fisch.
- Lepidium coronopus (L.) Al-Shehbaz
- Lepidium costaricense Thell.
- Lepidium crassius (C.L.Hitchc.) Al-Shehbaz
- Lepidium crassum Heenan & de Lange
- Lepidium crenatum (Greene) Rydb.
- Lepidium culminicola Mouterde
- Lepidium cumingianum Fisch. & C.A.Mey.
- Lepidium cuneiforme C.Y.Wu
- Lepidium curvinervium (Botsch. & Vved.) Al-Shehbaz & Mumm.
- Lepidium cuzcoensis Al-Shehbaz
- Lepidium cyclocarpum Thell.
- Lepidium davisii Rollins
- Lepidium densiflorum Schrad.
- Lepidium densipuberulum Al-Shehbaz
- Lepidium depressum Thell.
- Lepidium desertorum Eckl. & Zeyh.
- Lepidium desvauxii Thell.
- Lepidium dictyotum A.Gray
- Lepidium didymum L.
- Lepidium draba L.
- Lepidium drummondii Thell.
- Lepidium eastwoodiae Wooton
- Lepidium echinatum Hewson
- Lepidium ecklonii Schrad. ex Regel
- Lepidium ecuadorense Thell.
- Lepidium englerianum (Muschl.) Al-Shehbaz
- Lepidium fasciculatum Thell.
- Lepidium fenestratum (Boiss.) D.A.German
- Lepidium ferganense Korsh.
- Lepidium filicaule C.L.Hitchc.
- Lepidium filisegmentum C.L.Hitchc.
- Lepidium flavum Torr.
- Lepidium flexicaule Kirk
- Lepidium flexuosum Thunb.
- Lepidium foliosum Desv.
- Lepidium fraseri Thell.
- Lepidium fremontii S.Watson
- Lepidium galapagoensis Al-Shehbaz
- Lepidium genistoides Hewson
- Lepidium ginninderrense Scarlett
- Lepidium glastifolium Desf.
- Lepidium gracile (Chodat & Hassl.) Boelcke
- Lepidium graminifolium L.
- Lepidium grandifructum C.L.Hitchc.
- Lepidium heterophyllum Benth.
- Lepidium hickenii Al-Shehbaz
- Lepidium hirtum (L.) Sm.
- Lepidium howei-insulae Thell.
- Lepidium huberi S.L.Welsh & Goodrich
- Lepidium hypenantion Hewson
- Lepidium hyssopifolium Desv.
- Lepidium integrifolium Nutt.
- Lepidium inyangense Jonsell
- Lepidium jaredii Brandegee
- Lepidium jarmolenkoi V.M.Vinogr.
- Lepidium johnstonii C.L.Hitchc.
- Lepidium jujuyanum Al-Shehbaz
- Lepidium juvencum Heenan & de Lange
- Lepidium karataviense Regel & Schmalh.
- Lepidium karelinianum Al-Shehbaz
- Lepidium kawarau Petrie
- Lepidium keniense Jonsell
- Lepidium kirkii Petrie
- Lepidium lacerum C.A.Mey.
- Lepidium laeteviride (P.Royen) Hewson
- Lepidium lapazianum Al-Shehbaz & S.Beck
- Lepidium lasiocarpum Nutt.
- Lepidium latifolium L.
- Lepidium latipes Hook.
- Lepidium lepidioides (Coss. & Durieu) Al-Shehbaz
- Lepidium leptopetalum F.Muell.
- Lepidium leventii (V.I.Dorof.) D.A.German
- Lepidium limenophylax de Lange, Rance & D.A.Norton
- Lepidium linearilobum Al-Shehbaz
- Lepidium linifolium (Desv.) Steud.
- Lepidium lipskyi (N.Busch) Al-Shehbaz & Mumm.
- Lepidium litwinowii (Lipsky) Al-Shehbaz
- Lepidium longifolium (Boiss.) Al-Shehbaz
- Lepidium lyratogynum Hewson
- Lepidium lyratum L.
- Lepidium maccowagei Hewson
- Lepidium macrocarpum (Hedge) D.A.German
- Lepidium makateanum Sykes
- Lepidium matau Petrie
- Lepidium medocinense (Hauman) Al-Shehbaz
- Lepidium merrallii F.Muell.
- Lepidium meyenii Walp.
- Lepidium meyeri Claus
- Lepidium minor (Botsch. & Vved.) Al-Shehbaz
- Lepidium minutiflorum (Ridl.) Hewson
- Lepidium monoplocoides F.Muell.
- Lepidium montanum Nutt.
- Lepidium mossii Thell.
- Lepidium muelleriferdinandii Thell.
- Lepidium mummenhoffianum Al-Shehbaz
- Lepidium myrianthum Phil.
- Lepidium myriocarpum Sond.
- Lepidium nanum S.Watson
- Lepidium naufragorum Garn.-Jones & D.A.Norton
- Lepidium navasii (Pau) Al-Shehbaz
- Lepidium nesophilum Hewson ex P.S.Green
- Lepidium niloticum (Delile) Sieber
- Lepidium nitidum Nutt.
- Lepidium oblitum Houliston, Heenan & de Lange
- Lepidium oblongum Small
- Lepidium obtusatum Kirk
- Lepidium obtusum Basiner
- Lepidium oleraceum G.Forst. ex Sparrm.
- Lepidium olgae (R.M.Vinogr.) Al-Shehbaz & Mumm.
- Lepidium oligodontum de Lange & Heenan
- Lepidium orientale (Schrenk) Al-Shehbaz & Mumm.
- Lepidium ostleri S.L.Welsh & Goodrich
- Lepidium oxycarpum Nutt.
- Lepidium oxytrichum Sprague
- Lepidium paniculatum (Regel & Schmalh.) Al-Shehbaz
- Lepidium panniforme de Lange & Heenan
- Lepidium papilliferum (L.F.Hend.) A.Nelson & J.F.Macbr.
- Lepidium papillosum F.Muell.
- Lepidium parodii Thell.
- Lepidium patrinioides (Regel) Al-Shehbaz & Mumm.
- Lepidium pavlovii Al-Shehbaz & Mumm.
- Lepidium paysonii Rollins
- Lepidium pedersenii Al-Shehbaz
- Lepidium pedicellosum F.Muell.
- Lepidium peregrinum Thell.
- Lepidium perfoliatum L.
- Lepidium persicum Boiss.
- Lepidium philippianum (Kuntze) Thell.
- Lepidium phlebopetalum F.Muell.
- Lepidium pholidogynum F.Muell.
- Lepidium pinnatifidum Ledeb.
- Lepidium pinnatisectum (O.E.Schulz) C.L.Hitchc.
- Lepidium pinnatum Thunb.
- Lepidium platypetalum Hewson
- Lepidium propinquum Fisch. & C.A.Mey.
- Lepidium pseudodidymum Thell.
- Lepidium pseudohyssopifolium Hewson
- Lepidium pseudopapillosum Thell.
- Lepidium pseudoruderale Thell.
- Lepidium pseudotasmanicum Thell.
- Lepidium pterocarpum (Botsch. & Vved.) Al-Shehbaz & Mumm.
- Lepidium puberulum Bunge
- Lepidium pubescens Desv.
- Lepidium pumilum Boiss. & Balansa
- Lepidium quitense Turcz.
- Lepidium rahmeri Phil.
- Lepidium ramosissimum A.Nelson
- Lepidium reichei Phil. ex Reiche
- Lepidium rekohuense de Lange & Heenan
- Lepidium rhytidocarpum (Hook.) Al-Shehbaz
- Lepidium rigidum Pomel
- Lepidium robustum (Pavlov) Al-Shehbaz
- Lepidium rotundum DC.
- Lepidium ruderale L.
- Lepidium sagittatum (Kar. & Kir.) Al-Shehbaz
- Lepidium sagittulatum Thell.
- Lepidium santacruzensis Al-Shehbaz
- Lepidium sativum L.
- Lepidium scandens Hewson
- Lepidium schaffneri Thell.
- Lepidium schinzii Thell.
- Lepidium schlechteri Thell.
- Lepidium seditiosum de Lange, Heenan & J.R.Rolfe
- Lepidium serra H.Mann
- Lepidium serratum (Poir.) Al-Shehbaz
- Lepidium seydelii Al-Shehbaz
- Lepidium silaifolium (Hook.f. & Thomson) Al-Shehbaz & Mumm.
- Lepidium sisymbrioides Hook.f.
- Lepidium solomonii Al-Shehbaz
- Lepidium songaricum Schrenk
- Lepidium sordidum A.Gray
- Lepidium spathulatum Phil.
- Lepidium spicatum Desv.
- Lepidium spinosum Ard.
- Lepidium steinbachii O.E.Schulz
- Lepidium stephan-beckii Al-Shehbaz
- Lepidium strictum (S.Watson) Rattan ex B.L.Rob.
- Lepidium strongylophyllum F.Muell. ex Benth.
- Lepidium stuckertianum (Thell.) Boelcke
- Lepidium subalpinum Kom.
- Lepidium subcordatum Botsch. & Vved.
- Lepidium subulatum L.
- Lepidium suluense Marais
- Lepidium tandilense Boelcke
- Lepidium tenuicaule Kirk
- Lepidium thurberi Wooton
- Lepidium tianschanicum (Botsch. & Vved.) Al-Shehbaz
- Lepidium tiehmii (Rollins) Al-Shehbaz
- Lepidium tofaceum Rech.f.
- Lepidium tolmaczovii (Junussov) Al-Shehbaz
- Lepidium transvaalense Marais
- Lepidium trautvetteri (Botsch.) Al-Shehbaz
- Lepidium trianae Thell.
- Lepidium trifurcum Sond.
- Lepidium uzbekistanicum Al-Shehbaz
- Lepidium vesicarium L.
- Lepidium villarsii Gren. & Godr.
- Lepidium violaceum (Munby) Al-Shehbaz
- Lepidium virginicum L.
- Lepidium werffii Al-Shehbaz
- Lepidium xylodes Hewson
- Lepidium zambiense (Jonsell) Al-Shehbaz
