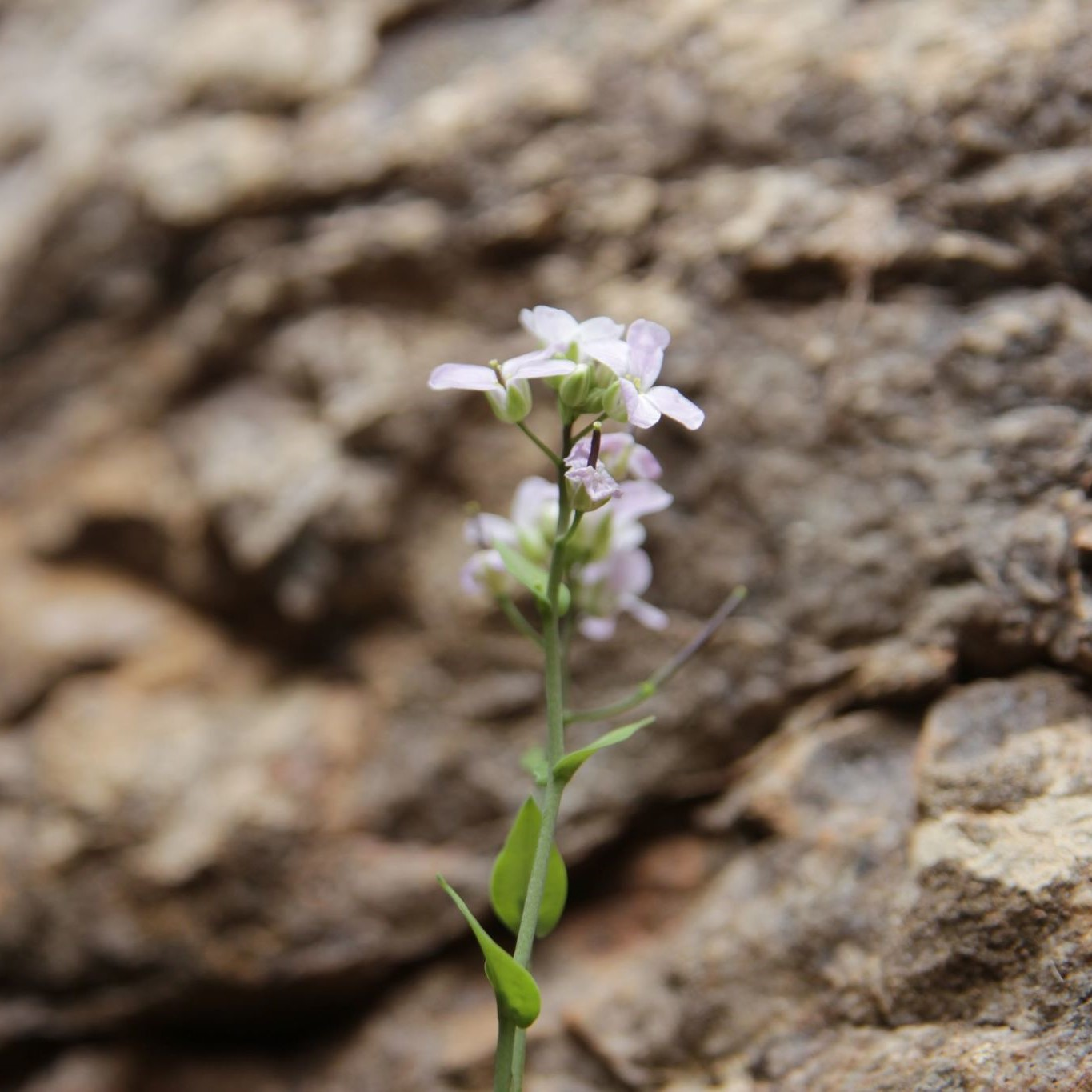
- Hurkaea conriginoides

Scientific classification
- Kingdom: Plantae
- Clade: Tracheophytes
- Clade: Angiosperms
- Clade: Eudicots
- Clade: Rosids
- Order: Brassicales
- Family: Brassicaceae
- Subfamily: Brassicoideae
- Tribe: Fourraeeae
- Genus: Hurkaea; Al-Shehbaz, M.Koch, R.Karl & D.A.German

Species
- Hurkaea conringioides (Ball) Al-Shehbaz, M.Koch, R.Karl & D.A.German; Hurkaea josiae (Jahand. & Maire) Al-Shehbaz, M.Koch, R.Karl & D.A.German

= Hurkaea =

Genus of flowering plants

Hurkaea is a genus of flowering plants in the family Brassicaceae. It includes two species endemic to Morocco.

- Hurkaea conringioides (Ball) Al-Shehbaz, M.Koch, R.Karl & D.A.German
- Hurkaea josiae (Jahand. & Maire) Al-Shehbaz, M.Koch, R.Karl & D.A.German
