= Yunkia =

Scientific classification
- Kingdom: Plantae
- Clade: Tracheophytes
- Clade: Angiosperms
- Clade: Eudicots
- Clade: Rosids
- Order: Brassicales
- Family: Brassicaceae
- Subfamily: Brassicoideae
- Tribe: Cremolobeae
- Genus: Yunkia; Salariato & Al-Shehbaz

Species
- Yunkia boliviana (Britton) Salariato & Al-Shehbaz; Yunkia subscandens (Kuntze) Salariato & Al-Shehbaz

Genus of flowering plants

Yunkia is a genus of flowering plants in the family Brassicaceae. It includes two species of perennials native to Bolivia and northwestern Argentina.

- Yunkia boliviana (Britton) Salariato & Al-Shehbaz – Bolivia
- Yunkia subscandens (Kuntze) Salariato & Al-Shehbaz – Bolivia and northwestern Argentina (Jujuy)
