= Coronopus =

Synonym for Lepidium, a genus of plants

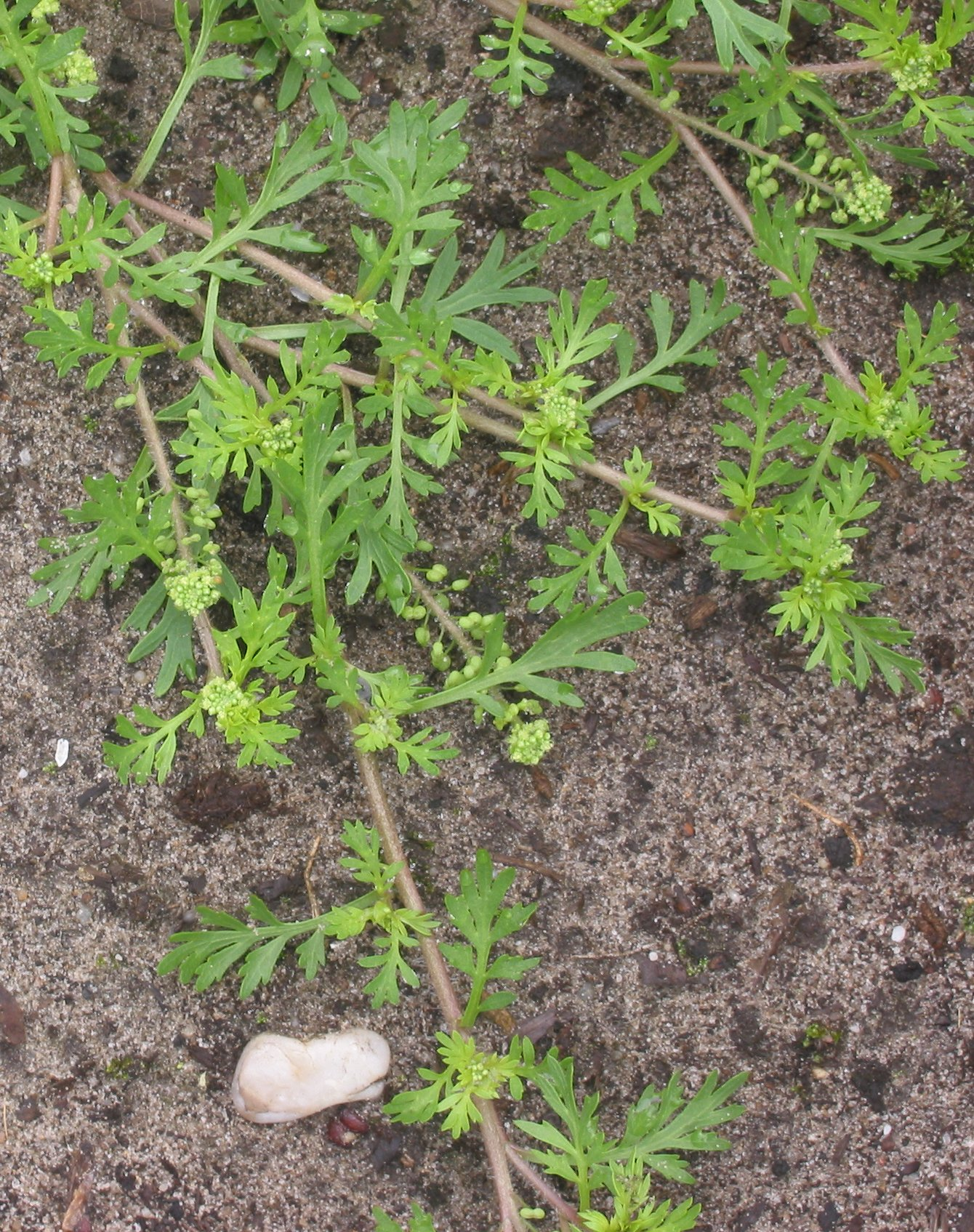
Coronopus didymus

Coronopus is a synonym for the accepted genus name Lepidium. It was applied to some species of flowering plants in the cabbage and mustard family Brassicaceae known commonly as swinecress or wartcress. These are generally low spreading annual herbaceous plants with many long stems, deeply lobed leaves and small white flowers. They have a strong scent, smelling like garden cress, Lepidium sativum, when crushed. Lepidium squamatus may be native to the Mediterranean but Lepidium didymum may be native to South America. Both species are widespread weedy introduced species in other areas.

Species include:

- Lepidium didymum - lesser swine cress
- Lepidium squamatus (since 2004, Lepidium coronopus,) - swine cress
