= Lysakia =

Scientific classification
- Kingdom: Plantae
- Clade: Tracheophytes
- Clade: Angiosperms
- Clade: Eudicots
- Clade: Rosids
- Order: Brassicales
- Family: Brassicaceae
- Subfamily: Brassicoideae
- Tribe: Thlaspideae
- Genus: Lysakia; Esmailbegi & Al-Shehbaz
- Species: L. rostrata

Binomial name
- Lysakia rostrata (Boiss. & Hohen.) Esmailbegi & Al-Shehbaz

Synonyms
- Cryptospora rostrata (Boiss. & Hohen.) Fenzl; Parlatoria rostrata Boiss. & Hohen.

Genus of flowering plants

Lysakia is a genus of flowering plants in the family Brassicaceae. It includes a single species, Lysakia rostrata, an annual endemic to Iran.

The species was first described as Parlatoria rostrata by Pierre Edmond Boissier and Rudolph Friedrich Hohenacker in 1849. In 2018 Shokouh Esmailbegi and Ihsan Ali Al-Shehbaz placed it in the new monotypic genus Lysakia as Lysakia rostrata.
