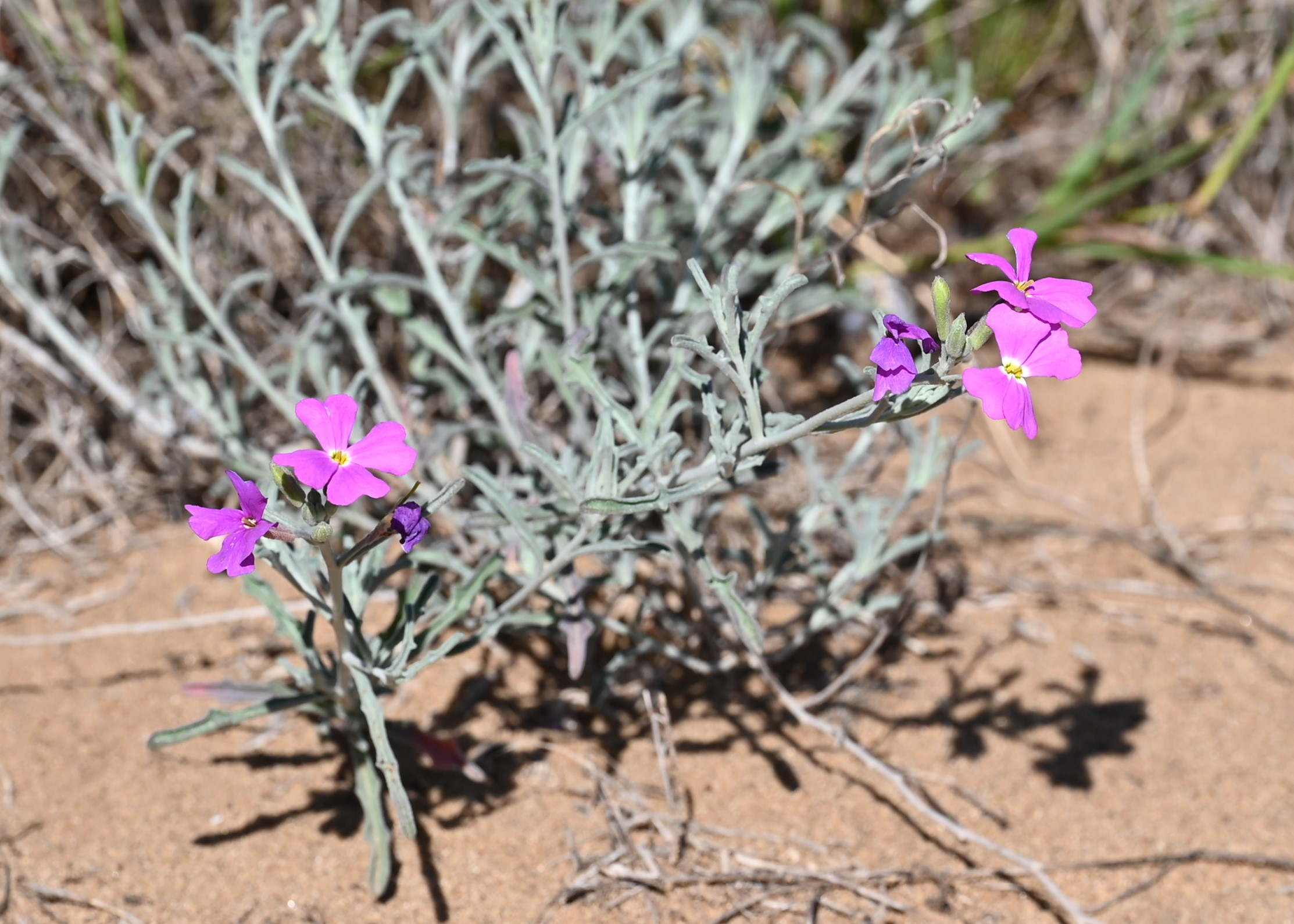
- Marcus-kochia littorea

Scientific classification
- Kingdom: Plantae
- Clade: Tracheophytes
- Clade: Angiosperms
- Clade: Eudicots
- Clade: Rosids
- Order: Brassicales
- Family: Brassicaceae
- Subfamily: Brassicoideae
- Tribe: Anastaticeae
- Genus: Marcus-kochia; Al-Shehbaz

Synonyms
- Pseudomalcolmia Fern.Prieto, Sanna, Arjona & Cires

= Marcus-kochia =

Genus of flowering plants

Marcus-kochia is a genus of flowering plants in the family Brassicaceae. It includes four species native to the western and central Mediterranean basin and the Canary Islands.

== Species ==
Four species are accepted.

- Marcus-kochia arenaria (Desf.) Al-Shehbaz – Algeria and Morocco
- Marcus-kochia littorea (L.) Al-Shehbaz – Canary Islands, Morocco, Algeria, Portugal, Spain, France, and mainland Italy
- Marcus-kochia ramosissima (Desf.) Al-Shehbaz – Morocco, Algeria, Tunisia, Portugal, Spain, Balearic Islands, France, Corsica, Sardinia, and mainland Italy
- Marcus-kochia triloba (L.) Al-Shehbaz – central and southern Iberian Peninsula and Morocco
