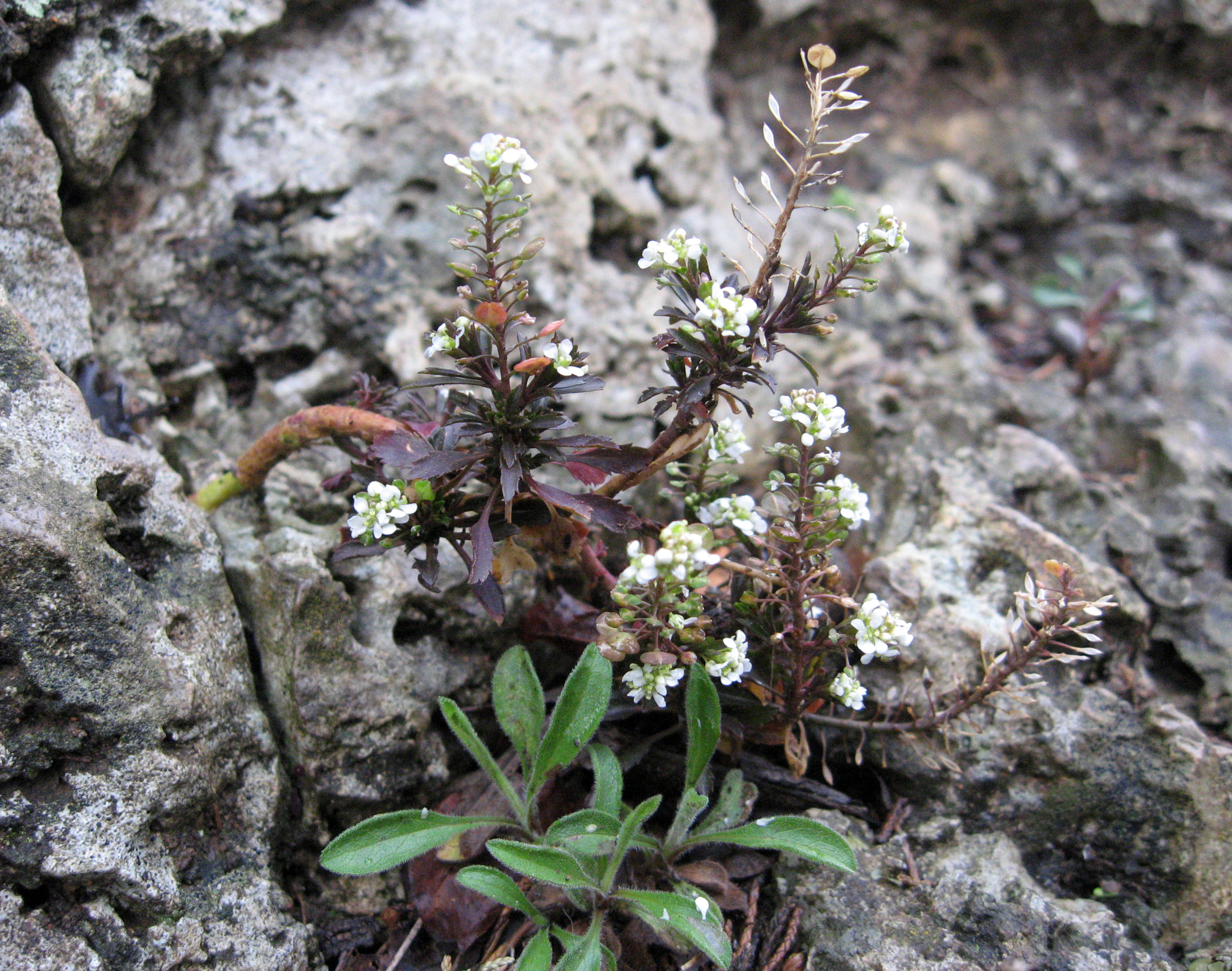
- subspecies virginicum

Conservation status
- Secure (NatureServe)

Scientific classification
- Kingdom: Plantae
- Clade: Tracheophytes
- Clade: Angiosperms
- Clade: Eudicots
- Clade: Rosids
- Order: Brassicales
- Family: Brassicaceae
- Genus: Lepidium
- Species: L. virginicum

Binomial name
- Lepidium virginicum L.

= Lepidium virginicum =

Species of flowering plant

Lepidium virginicum, also known as least pepperwort or Virginia pepperweed, is an herbaceous plant in the mustard family (Brassicaceae). It is native to much of North America, including most of the United States and Mexico and southern regions of Canada, as well as most of Central America. It can be found elsewhere as an introduced species.

Virginia pepperweed grows as a weed in most crops and is found in roadsides, landscapes and waste areas. It prefers sunny locales with dry soil.

== Description ==
Lepidium virginicum is an herbaceous annual or biennial. The entire plant is generally between 10 and 50 centimeters (3.9 and 19.7 in) tall. The leaves on the stems of Virginia pepperweed are sessile, linear to lanceolate and get larger as they approach the base.

As with Lepidium campestre, Virginia pepperweed's most identifiable characteristic is its raceme, which comes from the plant's highly branched stem. The racemes give Virginia pepperweed the appearance of a bottlebrush. On the racemes are first small white flowers, and later greenish fruits.

All parts of the plant have a peppery taste.

== Uses ==
The plant is edible. The young leaves can be used as a potherb, sautéed or used raw, such as in salads. The young seedpods can be used as a substitute for black pepper. The leaves contain protein, vitamin A and vitamin C.

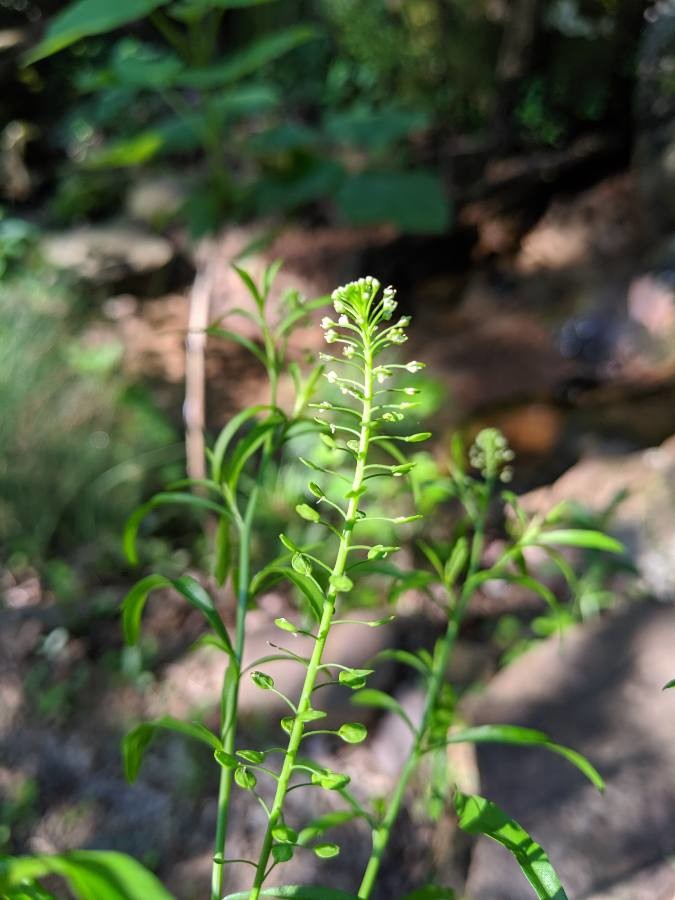
Flowers

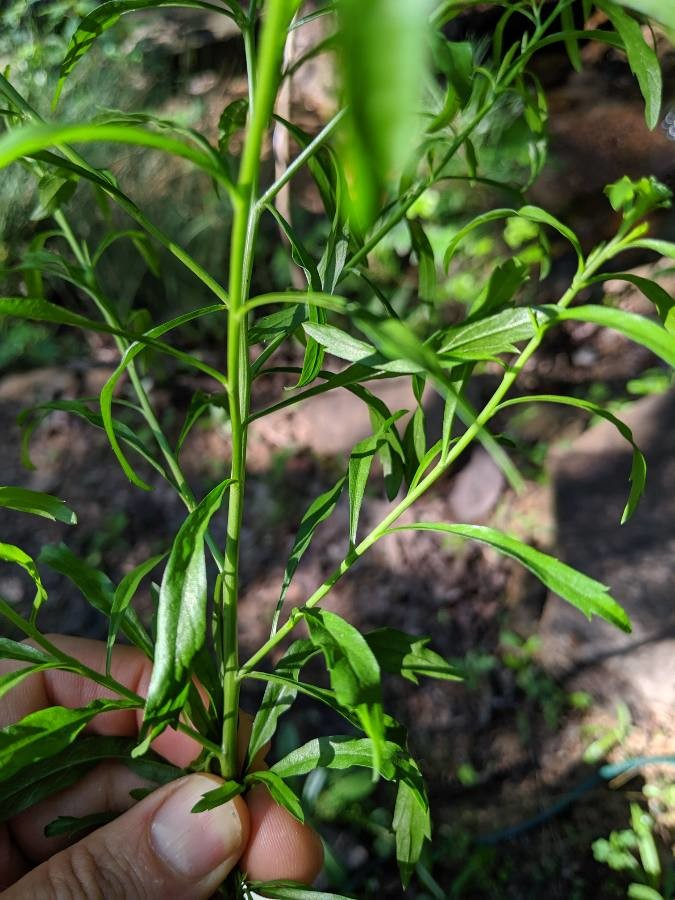
