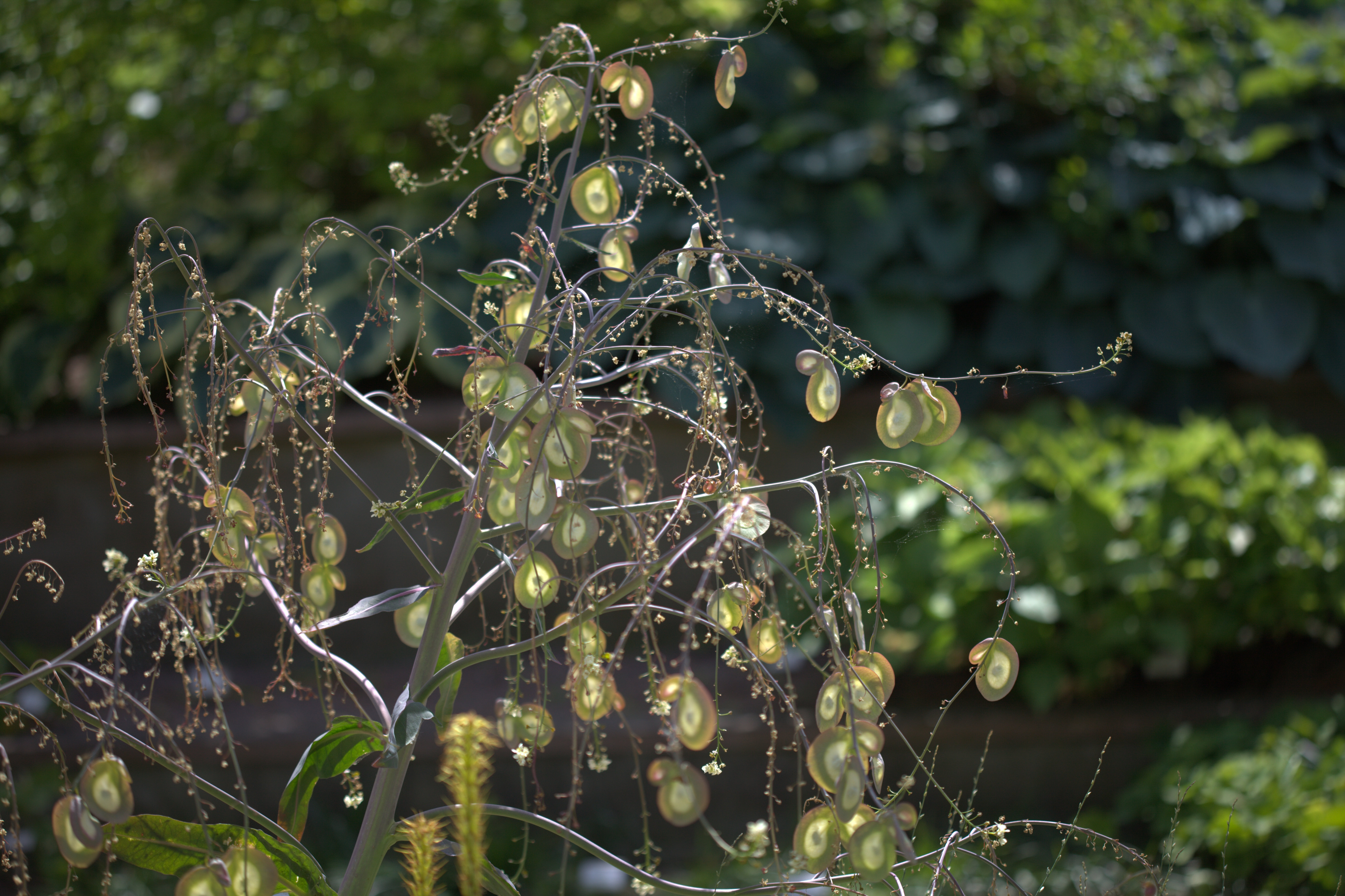
- Megacarpea gigantea, a plant in the megacarpea genus

Scientific classification
- Kingdom: Plantae
- Clade: Tracheophytes
- Clade: Angiosperms
- Clade: Eudicots
- Clade: Rosids
- Order: Brassicales
- Family: Brassicaceae
- Genus: Megacarpaea; DC.

= Megacarpaea =

Genus of plants

Megacarpaea is a genus of flowering plants belonging to the family Brassicaceae.

Its native range is Southern European Russia to Central Asia and Western and Central China. .

== Species ==
Species:

- Megacarpaea bifida Benth.
- Megacarpaea delavayi Franch.
- Megacarpaea gigantea Regel
- Megacarpaea gracilis Lipsky
- Megacarpaea iliensis Golosk. & Vassilcz.
- Megacarpaea megalocarpa (Fisch. ex DC.) Schischk. ex B.Fedtsch.
- Megacarpaea orbiculata B.Fedtsch.
- Megacarpaea polyandra Benth.
- Megacarpaea schugnanica B.Fedtsch.
