= Sphaerocardamum =

Scientific classification
- Kingdom: Plantae
- Clade: Tracheophytes
- Clade: Angiosperms
- Clade: Eudicots
- Clade: Rosids
- Order: Brassicales
- Family: Brassicaceae
- Genus: Sphaerocardamum; S.Schauer

Synonyms
- Cibotarium O.E.Schulz

Genus of plants

Sphaerocardamum is a genus of flowering plants belonging to the family Brassicaceae. Its native range is Northeastern Mexico.

Species:

- Sphaerocardamum compressum (Rollins) Rollins
- Sphaerocardamum divaricatum (Rollins) Rollins
- Sphaerocardamum macrum (Standl.) Rollins
- Sphaerocardamum nesliiforme S.Schauer
- Sphaerocardamum stellatum (S.Watson) Rollins
