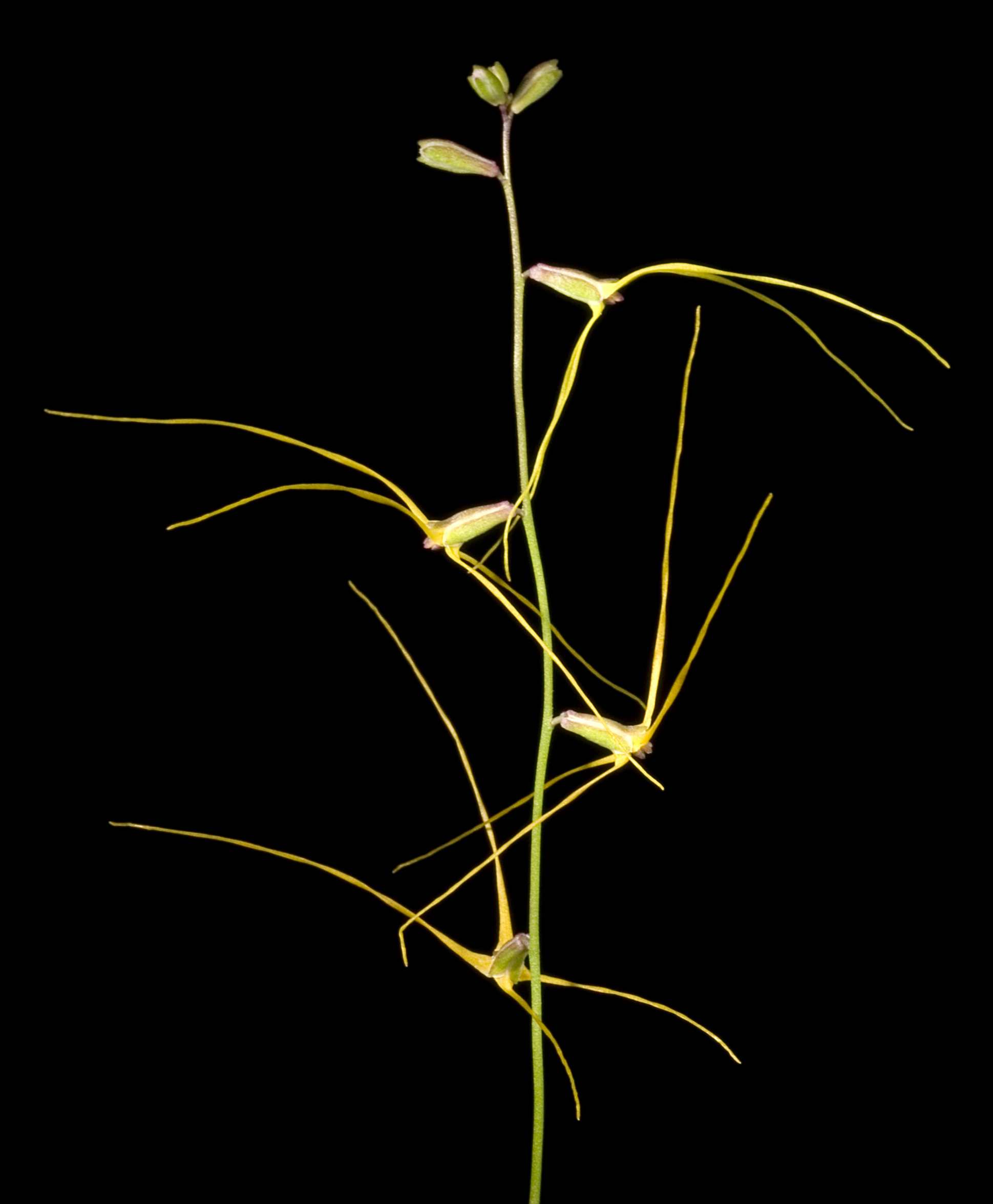
- Stenopetalum sp.

Scientific classification
- Kingdom: Plantae
- Clade: Tracheophytes
- Clade: Angiosperms
- Clade: Eudicots
- Clade: Rosids
- Order: Brassicales
- Family: Brassicaceae
- Genus: Stenopetalum; R.Br. ex DC.

= Stenopetalum =

Genus of plants in the mustard family

Stenopetalum (common name thread petal) is a genus in the Brassicaceae family which is endemic to Australia. It was first described by Robert Brown in 1821.

== Species ==
There are 11 species in the genus.

- Stenopetalum anfractum E.A. Shaw
- Stenopetalum decipiens E.A. Shaw
- Stenopetalum filifolium Benth.
- Stenopetalum lineare R. Br. ex DC.
- Stenopetalum nutans F. Muell.
- Stenopetalum pedicellare F. Muell. ex Benth.
- Stenopetalum robustum Endl.
- Stenopetalum salicola Keighery
- Stenopetalum saxatile Keighery
- Stenopetalum sphaerocarpum F. Muell.
- Stenopetalum velutinum F. Muell.

== Description ==
Plants in this genus may be annuals or perennials. They are erect and may be with or without hair. The sepals are saccate (shaped like a pouch or sack) and have two forms. The petals are clawed and drawn out into a long, narrow apex. There are six stamens. The fruit opens at maturity to release the seeds. There are four to twenty mucous seeds in each locule, arranged in two rows.

== Etymology ==
The name Stenopetalum derives from the Greek, stenos, ("narrow"), and the Latin, petalum, ("petal"), and describes plants in the genus as having long, narrow petals.
