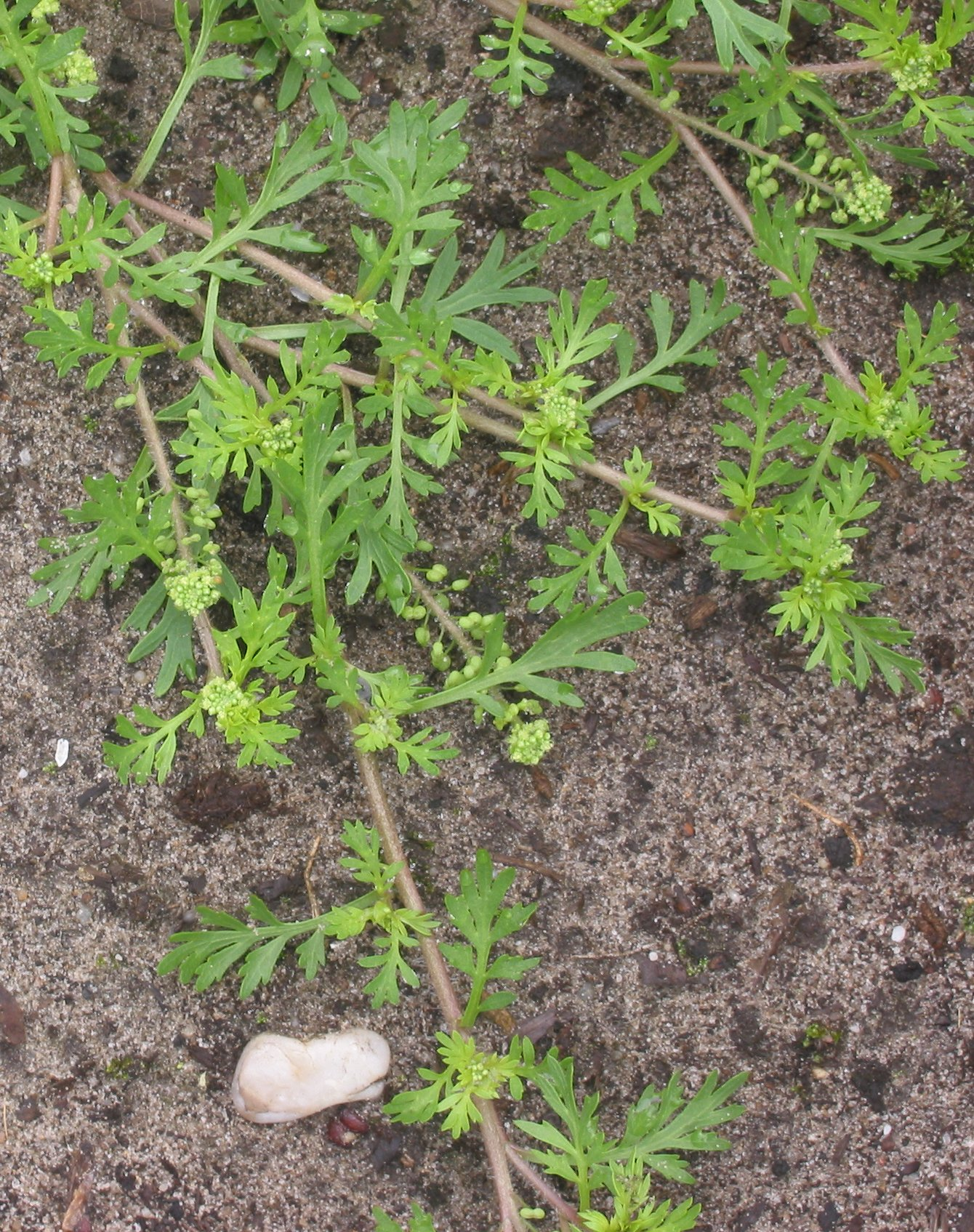

Scientific classification
- Kingdom: Plantae
- Clade: Tracheophytes
- Clade: Angiosperms
- Clade: Eudicots
- Clade: Rosids
- Order: Brassicales
- Family: Brassicaceae
- Genus: Lepidium
- Species: L. didymum

Binomial name
- Lepidium didymum L.

Synonyms
- Coronopus didymus

= Lepidium didymum =

Lesser swine-cress

Species of flowering plant

Lepidium didymum, the lesser swine-cress, is a species of flowering plant in the family Brassicaceae.

== Description ==
Lepidium didymum is an annual or biennial herb with decumbent or ascending and glabrous green stems, up to 40 centimetres (16 in) long, radiating from a central position. The leaves are pinnate and alternate and can reach a length of 5 cm (2 in). It blooms between July and September. The flowers are inconspicuous, with four very short white petals or none at all, and 2 (rarely 4), stamens. The fruits consist of two rounded valves, notched at the apex, with a very short style between them. They are wrinkled and contain orange or reddish brown seeds, that are 1–5 mm long.

== Taxonomy ==
It was first described and published by the Swedish botanist Carl Linnaeus in 'Mant. Pl.' (Mantissa Plantarum) on page 92 in 1767.

The specific epithet didymum, refers to the Greek word δίδυμα for 'twin' or 'in pairs', referring to the seed capsule.

== Distribution ==
Lepidium didymum is of uncertain origin, but is often cited as native to South America, mainly Argentina, Bolivia, Brazil, Chile, Paraguay, Peru, Uruguay and Venezuela. It has been introduced elsewhere as a weed of cultivation. It has naturalised across the globe, from Africa, Europe, Asia, Australasia, North America and South America. In Britain, it had been recorded from the wild by 1778, chiefly in England and the south of Ireland, growing on cultivated and waste ground, in gardens and lawns, by paths and roadsides.

== Uses ==
The leaves of this plant are edible, and have a salty, cress or mustard flavour.
