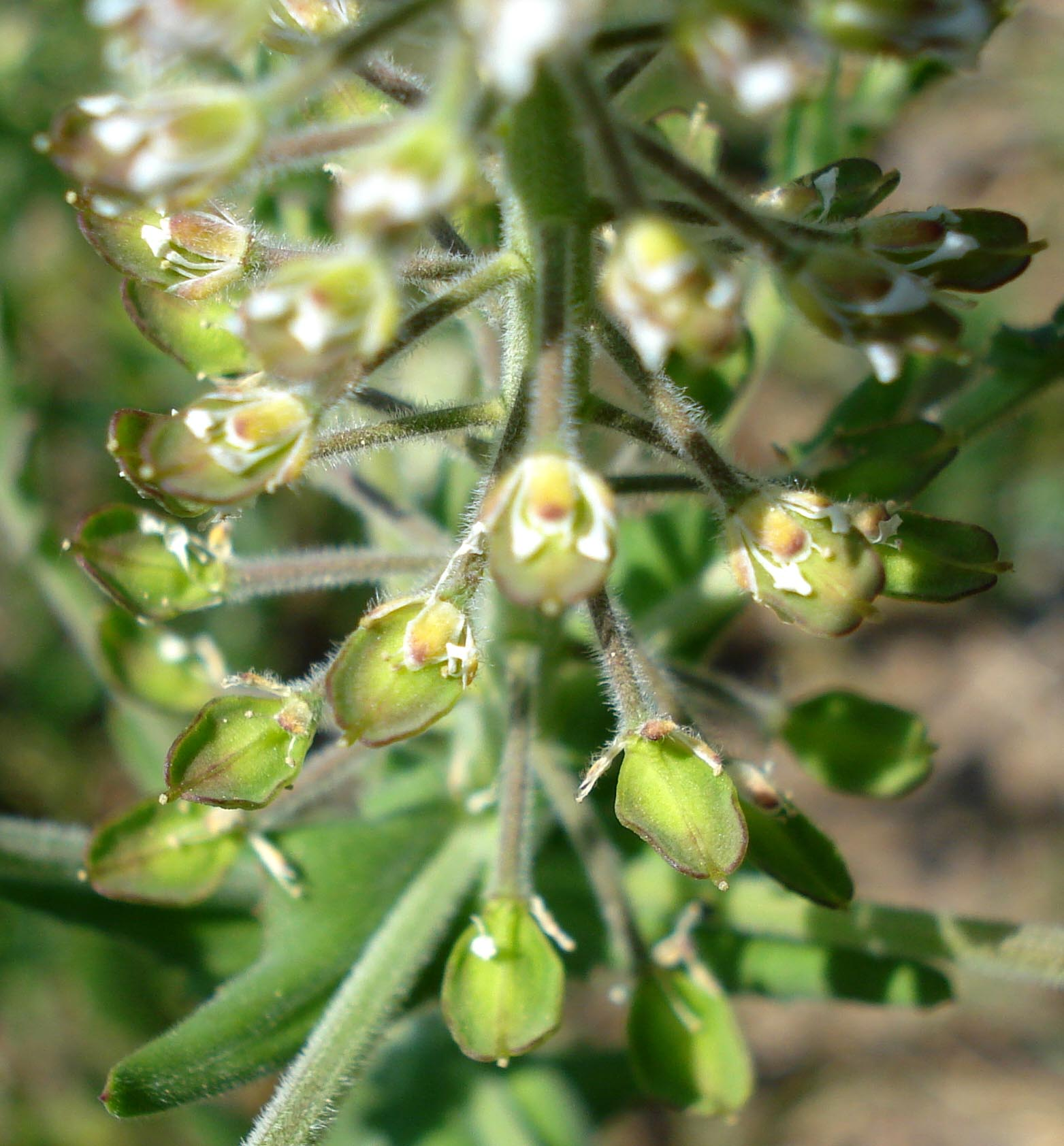

Scientific classification
- Kingdom: Plantae
- Clade: Tracheophytes
- Clade: Angiosperms
- Clade: Eudicots
- Clade: Rosids
- Order: Brassicales
- Family: Brassicaceae
- Genus: Lepidium
- Species: L. campestre

Binomial name
- Lepidium campestre (L.) W.T.Aiton

= Lepidium campestre =

Species of flowering plant

Lepidium campestre, the field pepperwort, field peppercress, field peppergrass, field pepperweed or field cress, is usually a biennial with some form of annual plant in the Brassicaceae or mustard family, native to Europe, but commonly found in North America as an invasive weed. The most notable characteristic of field pepperweed is the raceme of flowers which forks off of the stem. These racemes are made up of first small white flowers and later green, flat and oval seedpods each about 6 mm long and 4 mm wide. Each seedpod contains two brown, 2.5 mm long seeds.

The stem of field pepperweed comes out of a basal rosette of toothed leaves. The stem is covered in leaves, which are sessile, alternate and arrow-shaped. The entire plant is generally between 20 and 60 cm tall and covered in small hairs.

== Cultivation and uses ==
Field pepperweed grows in disturbed land, crops, and waste places. It can tolerate most soils.

The plant is edible. The young leaves can be eaten as greens, added raw to salads or boiled for ten minutes. The young fruits and seeds can be used as a spice, with a taste between black pepper and mustard. The leaves contain protein, vitamin A and vitamin C.

== Domestication ==
Field cress has been targeted for domestication at the Swedish University of Agricultural Sciences (SLU), because it holds high agronomic promise as a biennial/perennial oilseed crop as it has many good characteristics of a high-yielding winter-hardy crop. Unlike any other oilseed crop, field cress can be highly productive in the northern parts of temperate regions and has been successfully grown in Umeå, Sweden (40 km south of the Arctic Circle) where it can yield correspondingly 3.3 tons/ha. In addition, field cress provides important ecosystem services as it functions as a cover crop during winter and can be undersown a spring cereal. The oil of field cress is suitable for different industrial applications such as production of hydrotreated vegetable oil diesel (HVO). The researchers at SLU have identified and mapped several genes in field cress that are known to be important for domestication related traits such as flowering time, pod shattering and seed dormancy.

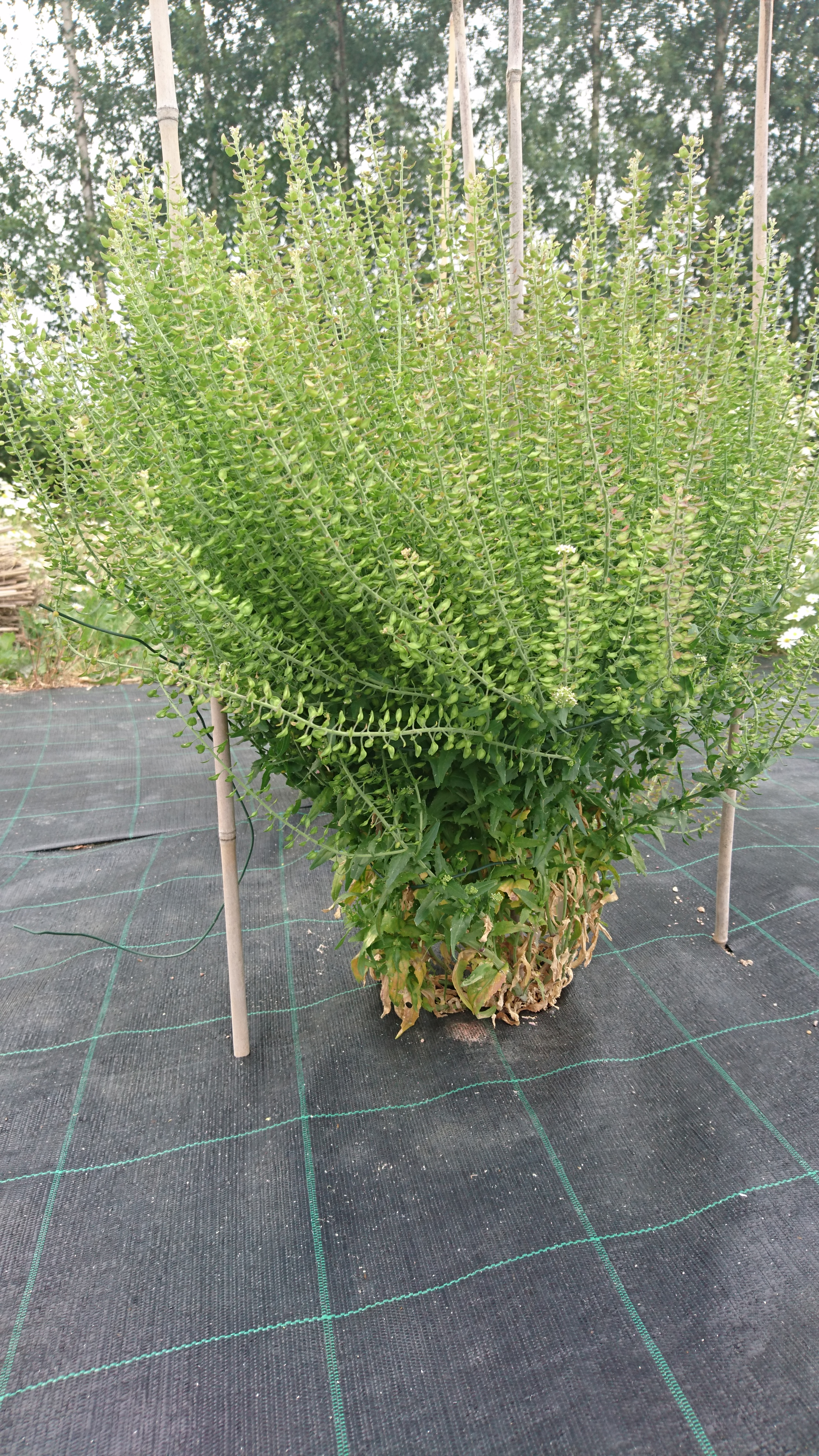
