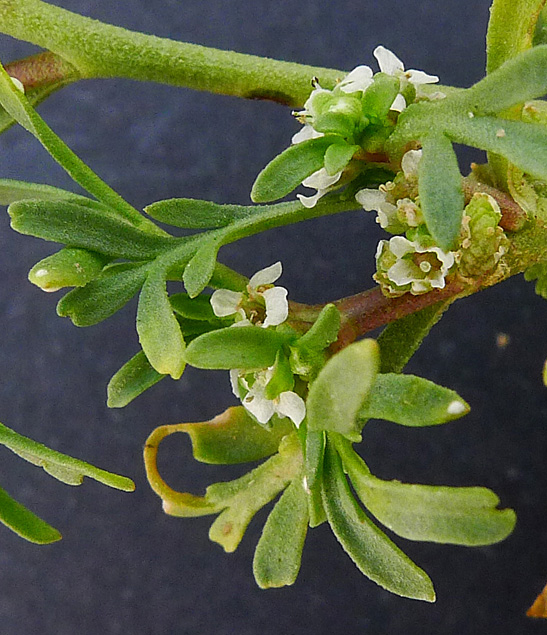

Scientific classification
- Kingdom: Plantae
- Clade: Tracheophytes
- Clade: Angiosperms
- Clade: Eudicots
- Clade: Rosids
- Order: Brassicales
- Family: Brassicaceae
- Genus: Lepidium
- Species: L. coronopus

Binomial name
- Lepidium coronopus (L.) Al-Shehbaz

Synonyms
- Synonyms: Carara coronopus (L.) Medik.; Cochlearia coronopus L.; Cochlearia repens Lam.; Cochlearia tenuifolia Salisb.; Coronopus coadunatus Stokes; Coronopus coronopus (L.) H.Karst. [Invalid]; Coronopus cristatus Clairv.; Coronopus depressus Moench; Coronopus procumbens Gilib. ex Ces., Pass. & Gibelli; Coronopus procumbens Gilib.; Coronopus ruellii All.; Coronopus squamatus (Forssk.) Asch.; Coronopus squamatus subsp. conradi Muschl.; Coronopus squamatus subsp. verrucarius Muschl.; Coronopus verrucarius Muschl. & Thell.; Coronopus verrucarius var. procumbens Muschl.; Coronopus vulgaris Desf.; Crucifera ruellii E.H.L.Krause; Lepidium squamatum Forssk.; Myagrum coronopus (L.) Crantz; Nasturtium verrucarium Garsault [Invalid]; Senebiera coronopus (L.) Cav.; Senebiera coronopus (L.) Poir.

= Lepidium coronopus =

Species of flowering plant

Lepidium coronopus, (swine cress, creeping wart cress, or greater swine cress), is a species of flowering plant in the mustard family which is native to parts of Africa, western Asia and Europe, growing in shingle banks, wasteland or cultivated fields.

== Description ==
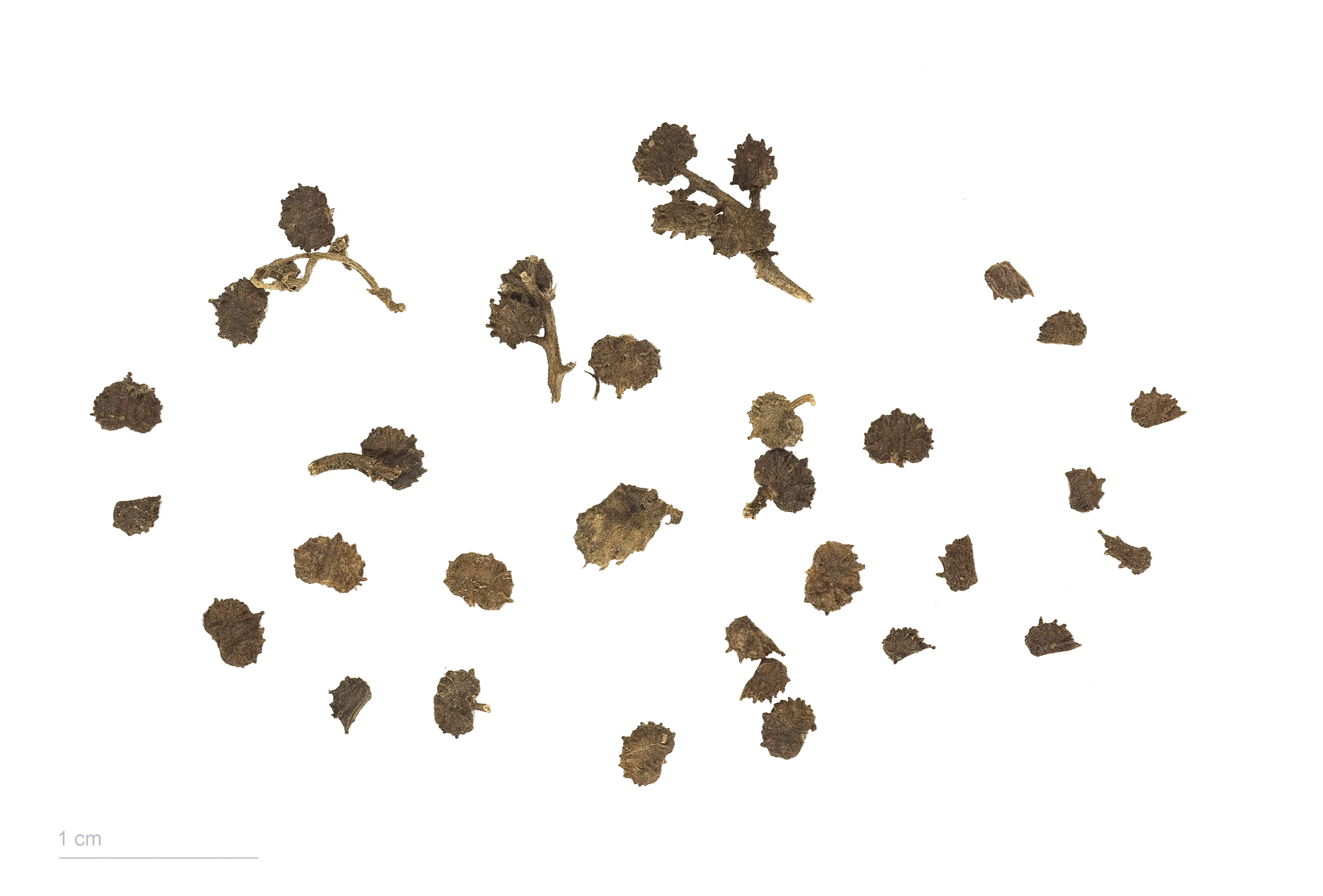
Seed specimens

Lepidium coronopus is a robust herb, grown as an annual, and rarely as a biennial. It is a low, to short prostrate plant, with often several from base, stems that sprawl, trail or spread, and very rarely ascending. It can reach between 5–12 cm (2.0 in – 4.7 in) tall, with the more or less hairless, and branched distally, stems reaching 5–30 cm (2.0 in – 11.8 in) long.

It has two types of leaves, basal and cauline (along the stem), the basal leaves are rosulate (form a rosette), with a petiole (leaf stalk) 2–5 cm (0.79 in – 1.97 in) long. They are pinnatisect (having lobes with incisions that extend almost, or up to midrib), the lobes are dark green and strap like. The cauline leaves are shortly petiolate, or stalkless, they are also pinnatisect, or more or less unlobed. The leaves are dull blue-green, or greyish green.

Although Swine Cress (Lepidium coronopus) is very similar in form to Lesser Swine Cress (Lepidium didymum) but the leaves of Lesser Swine cress are edible. Other differences between the two plants include; l. didymum has 2 stamens while L. coronopus has 6 and the fruits are very different.

Lepidium coronopus begins blooming between May and August, or between June and September. The small flowers, are about 0.2–0.4 cm (0.079 in – 0.157 in) wide. They are white, or purplish, growing in clusters opposite a leaf, on short racemes. The rachis is glabrous (hairy). The flowers have 4 petals which are obovate to oblong shaped, that are longer than the sepals, which are oblong shaped. It has 6 stamens, small anthers.

After flowering, it produces fruits (or seed capsules). They are small 0.3–0.47 cm (0.12 in – 0.19 in) across, reniform (kidney shaped), to ovate-cordate shaped. They have a wart-like surface, and irregularly wrinkled, or has pointed bumps. The fruit only contains 1 or 2 seeds, the dirty yellowish, seeds are small, 1.1-1.5 by 1.3-1.7 mm, elliptic and flattish, and pear-shaped, or ovate-oblong. They are curved but not winged.

== Phytochemistry ==
The chemotaxonomy of the plant was completed in 2008. It's chromosome count is 2n = 32.

== Taxonomy ==
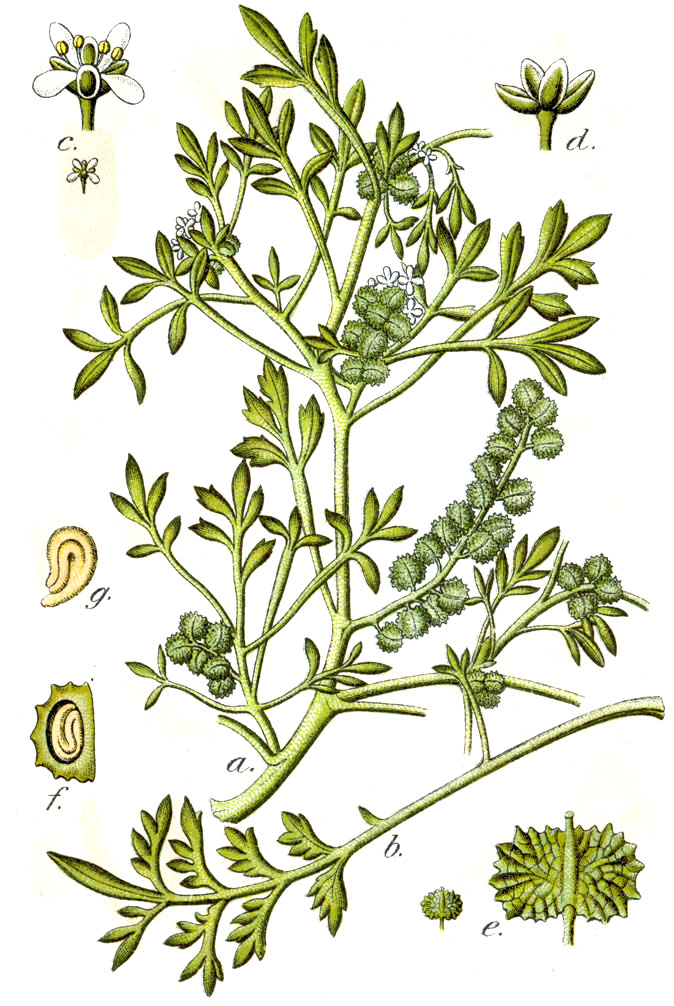
Illustration from Deutschlands Flora in Abbildungen painted by Johann Georg Sturm in 1796

It has a few common names including 'creeping wart cress', 'warty swine-cress', which is derived from the distinctive fruits, 'crowfoot' (it's leaf shape), 'greater swine cress', and 'swine cress'. The name 'swine cress' comes from its use as a poor quality salad alternative and thought only suitable for eating by pigs.

It was originally described and published as Cochlearia coronopus by the Swedish botanist Carl Linnaeus in his seminal publication 'Species Plantarum' Vol.2 in 1753, on page 648. Later as the Lepidium species was formed, Ihsan Ali Al-Shehbaz then published the plant as Lepidium coronopus in 'Novon' Vol.14 on page 152 in 2004.

The specific epithet coronopus takes its name from the Greek, as found in Theophrastus' treatise on plants (c. 371 – c. 287 BC, Greek philosopher and author). The name in Greek is κορωνοπους, meaning 'crowfoot' (or κορωνηπους ), and revolves around the leaf's shape.

== Distribution and habitat ==
Lepidium coronopus is native to temperate areas of Africa, western Asia and Europe.

=== Range ===
It is found in Africa, within Algeria, Egypt, Libya, Morocco and Tunisia. It is also found in western Asia, within Armenia, Azerbaijan, the Caucasus, Dagestan (in Russia), Georgia, Iran, Iraq, Israel, Jordan, Lebanon, Syria and Turkey. In middle Europe, it is found within Austria, Belgium, the Czech Republic, Germany, Hungary, the Netherlands, Poland, Slovakia, Switzerland and Ukraine. In northern Europe, within Denmark, Finland, Ireland, Sweden and the United Kingdom. In southern England, around the coasts of Wales and on the southern coasts in Ireland, it is common. In south-eastern Europe, within Albania, Bosnia and Herzegovina, Bulgaria, Croatia, Greece, Italy, Macedonia, Montenegro, Romania, Serbia and Slovenia. In southwestern Europe within France, Portugal and Spain.

It has also widely naturalised in other places, such as Norway in Europe. In Africa, within the Azores, the Madeira Islands, the Canary Islands and South Africa. In Australia, within the state of South Australia, Tasmania, Victoria and in New Zealand. In America, has widely naturalised in North America, from the provinces of New Brunswick, Nova Scotia, Ontario and Quebec in Canada. Also in the American states of Missouri, New Jersey, Alabama, Louisiana, Tennessee and California. Lastly in South America, within Chile.

=== Habitat ===
It is found growing in waste grounds, pathways, arable fields, abandoned fields, pastures, disturbed sites and along roadsides. It also likes well trodden places, or compacted soils, such as field gateways, or field entrances.

== Uses ==
It was previously used as an alternative to watercress (in salads), but it was deemed such poor quality and only suitable for pigs to eat. It is thought to be slightly tasting of mustard.
