= Brassicoideae =

Scientific classification
- Kingdom: Plantae
- Clade: Tracheophytes
- Clade: Angiosperms
- Clade: Eudicots
- Clade: Rosids
- Order: Brassicales
- Family: Brassicaceae
- Subfamily: Brassicoideae; Prantl & Karl

Subfamily of plants

The subfamily Brassicoideae

Brassicoideae is a subfamily contained within the family Brassicaceae of flowering plants. It is one of the two subfamilies of Brassicaceae, along with Aethionemoideae, and contains five supertribes -- Arabodae, Brassicodae, Camelinodae, Heliophilodae, and Hesperodae. Containing the vast majority of genera and 98.6% of species within the mustard family, it has the same distribution as the family in general—that is, a cosmopolitan distribution focused on temperate areas of the Northern Hemisphere.

== Taxonomy ==
Brassicoideae contains the following five supertribes:

- Arabodae
- Brassicodae
- Camelinodae
- Heliophilodae
- Hesperodae
