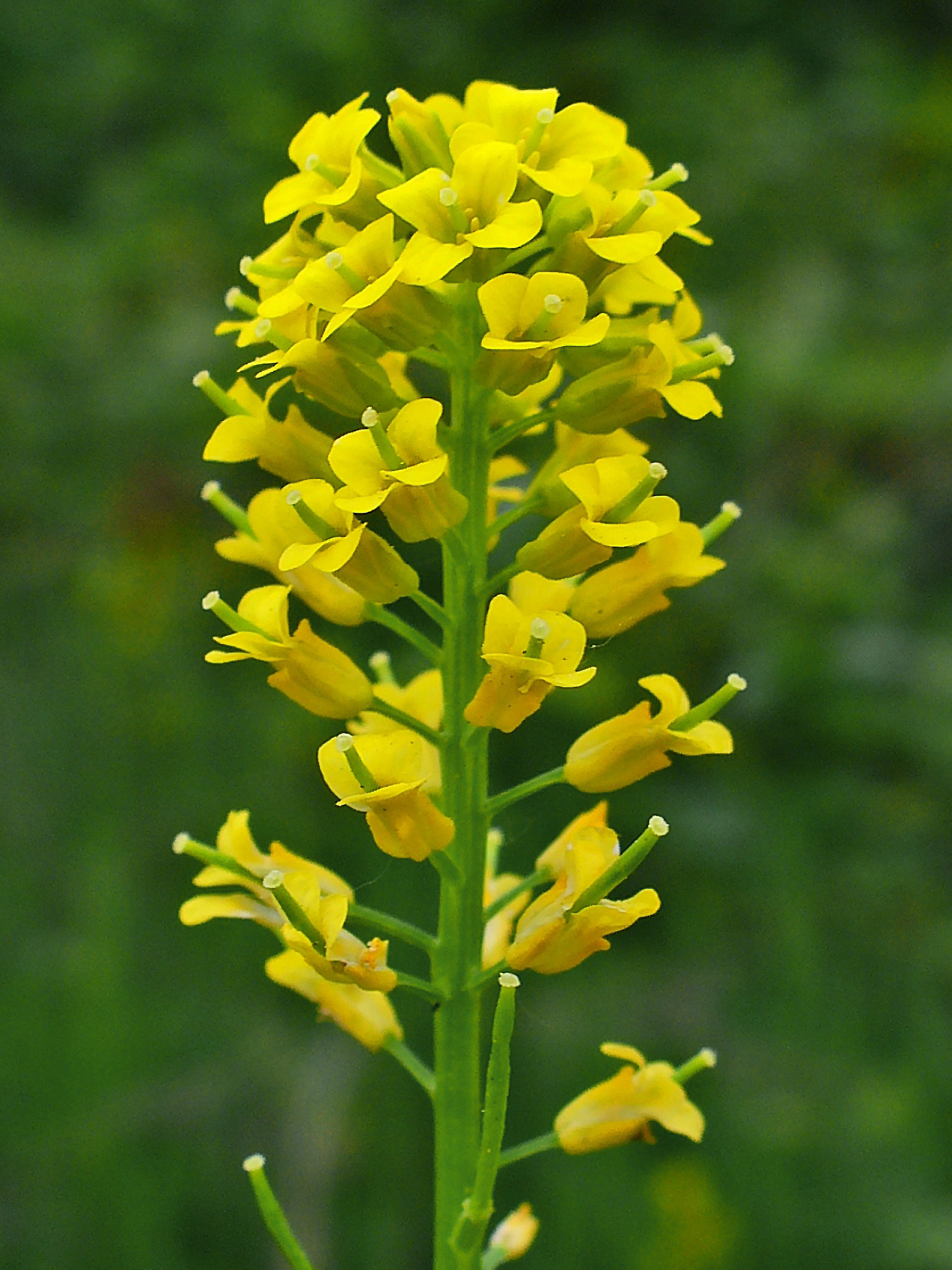
- Winter cress, Barbarea vulgaris

Scientific classification
- Kingdom: Plantae
- Clade: Tracheophytes
- Clade: Angiosperms
- Clade: Eudicots
- Clade: Rosids
- Order: Brassicales
- Family: Brassicaceae; Burnett

Genera
- See list of Brassicaceae genera

= Brassicaceae =

Family of flowering plants

Brassicaceae (/ˌbræsɪˈkeɪsiːˌiː, -siˌaɪ/) or (the older but equally valid) Cruciferae (/kruːˈsɪfəri/) is a medium-sized and economically important family of flowering plants commonly known as the mustards, the crucifers, or the cabbage family. Most are herbaceous plants, while some are shrubs. The leaves are simple (although are sometimes deeply incised), lack stipules, and appear alternately on stems or in rosettes. The inflorescences are terminal and lack bracts. The flowers have four free sepals, four free alternating petals, two shorter free stamens and four longer free stamens. The fruit has seeds in rows, divided by a thin wall (or septum). As of 2023, the family was divided into two subfamilies, Brassicoideae and Aethionemoideae, and as of September 2025, it contained over 350 accepted genera.

The family contains the cruciferous vegetables, including species such as Brassica oleracea (cultivated as cabbage, kale, cauliflower, broccoli and collards), Brassica rapa (turnip, Chinese cabbage, etc.), Brassica napus (rapeseed, etc.), Raphanus sativus (common radish), Armoracia rusticana (horseradish), the cut-flower Matthiola (stock) and the model organism Arabidopsis thaliana (thale cress).

Pieris rapae and other butterflies of the family Pieridae are some of the best-known pests of Brassicaceae species planted as commercial crops. Trichoplusia ni (cabbage looper) moth is also becoming increasingly problematic for crucifers due to its resistance to commonly used pest control methods. Some rarer Pieris butterflies, such as P. virginiensis, depend upon native mustards for their survival in their native habitats. Some non-native mustards such as Alliaria petiolata (garlic mustard), an extremely invasive species in the United States, can be toxic to their larvae.

== Description ==
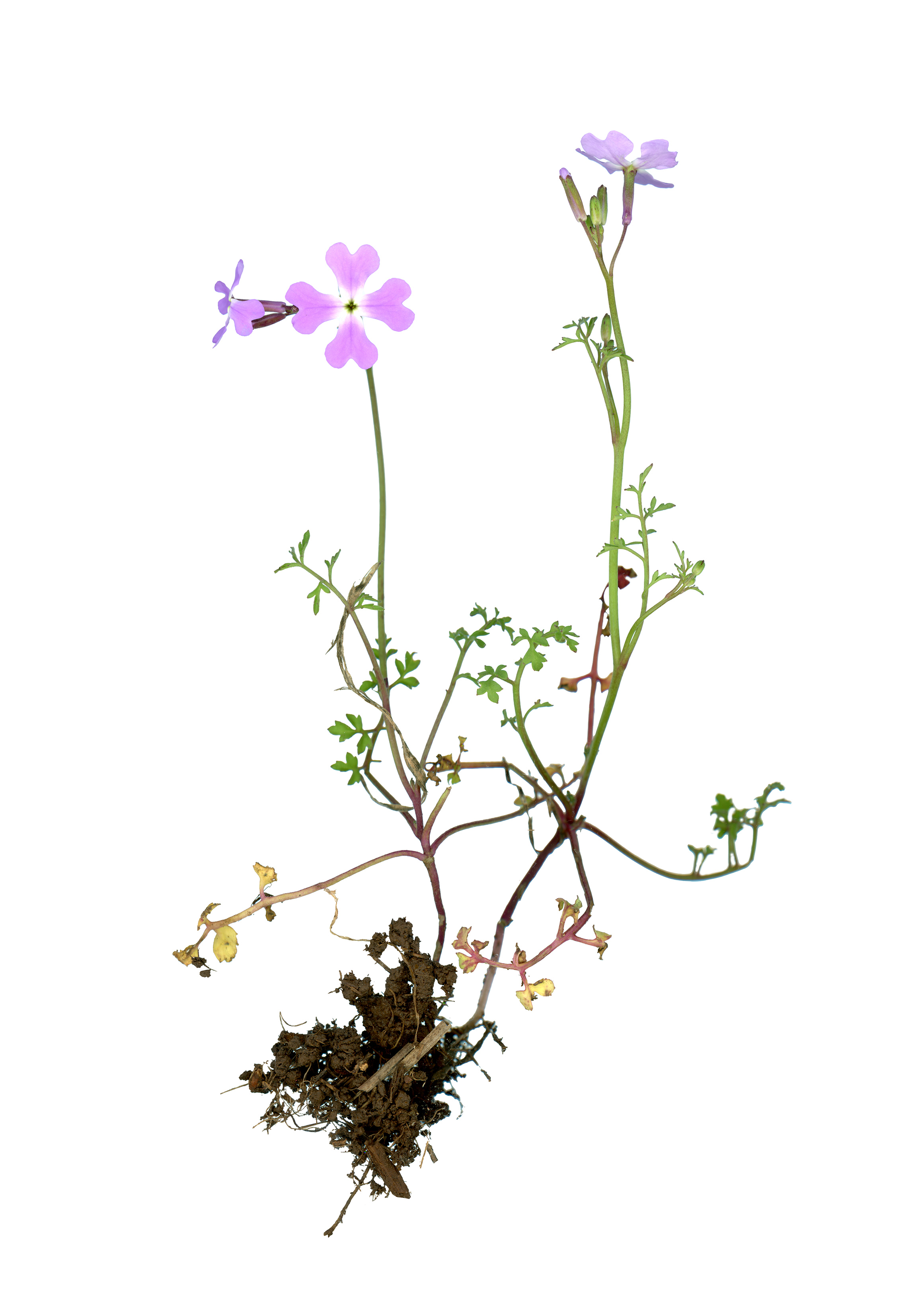
Ricotia lunaria

Species belonging to the Brassicaceae are mostly annual, biennial, or perennial herbaceous plants, some are dwarf shrubs or shrubs, and very few vines. Although generally terrestrial, a few species such as water awlwort live submerged in fresh water. They may have a taproot or a sometimes woody caudex that may have few or many branches, some have thin or tuberous rhizomes, or rarely develop runners. Few species have multi-cellular glands. Hairs consist of one cell and occur in many forms: from simple to forked, star-, tree- or T-shaped, rarely taking the form of a shield or scale. They are never topped by a gland. The stems may be upright, rise up towards the tip, or lie flat, are mostly herbaceous but sometimes woody. Stems carry leaves or the stems may be leafless (in Caulanthus), and some species lack stems altogether. The leaves do not have stipules, but there may be a pair of glands at base of leaf stalks and flower stalks. The leaf may be seated or have a leafstalk. The leaf blade is usually simple, entire or dissected, rarely trifoliolate or pinnately compound. A leaf rosette at the base may be present or absent. The leaves along the stem are almost always alternately arranged, rarely apparently opposite. The stomata are of the anisocytic type. The genome size of Brassicaceae compared to that of other Angiosperm families is very small to small (less than 3.425 million base pairs per cell), varying from 150 Mbp in Arabidopsis thaliana and Sphaerocardamum spp., to 2375 Mbp Bunias orientalis. The number of homologous chromosome sets varies from four (n=4) in some Physaria and Stenopetalum species, five (n=5) in other Physaria and Stenopetalum species, Arabidopsis thaliana and a Mathiola species, to seventeen (n=17). About 35% of the species in which chromosomes have been counted have eight sets (n=8). Due to polyploidy, some species may have up to 256 individual chromosomes, with some very high counts in the North American species of Cardamine, such as C. diphylla. Hybridisation is not unusual in Brassicaceae, especially in Arabis, Rorippa, Cardamine and Boechera. Hybridisation between species originating in Africa and California, and subsequent polyploidisation is surmised for Lepidium species native to Australia and New Zealand.

=== Inflorescence and flower ===
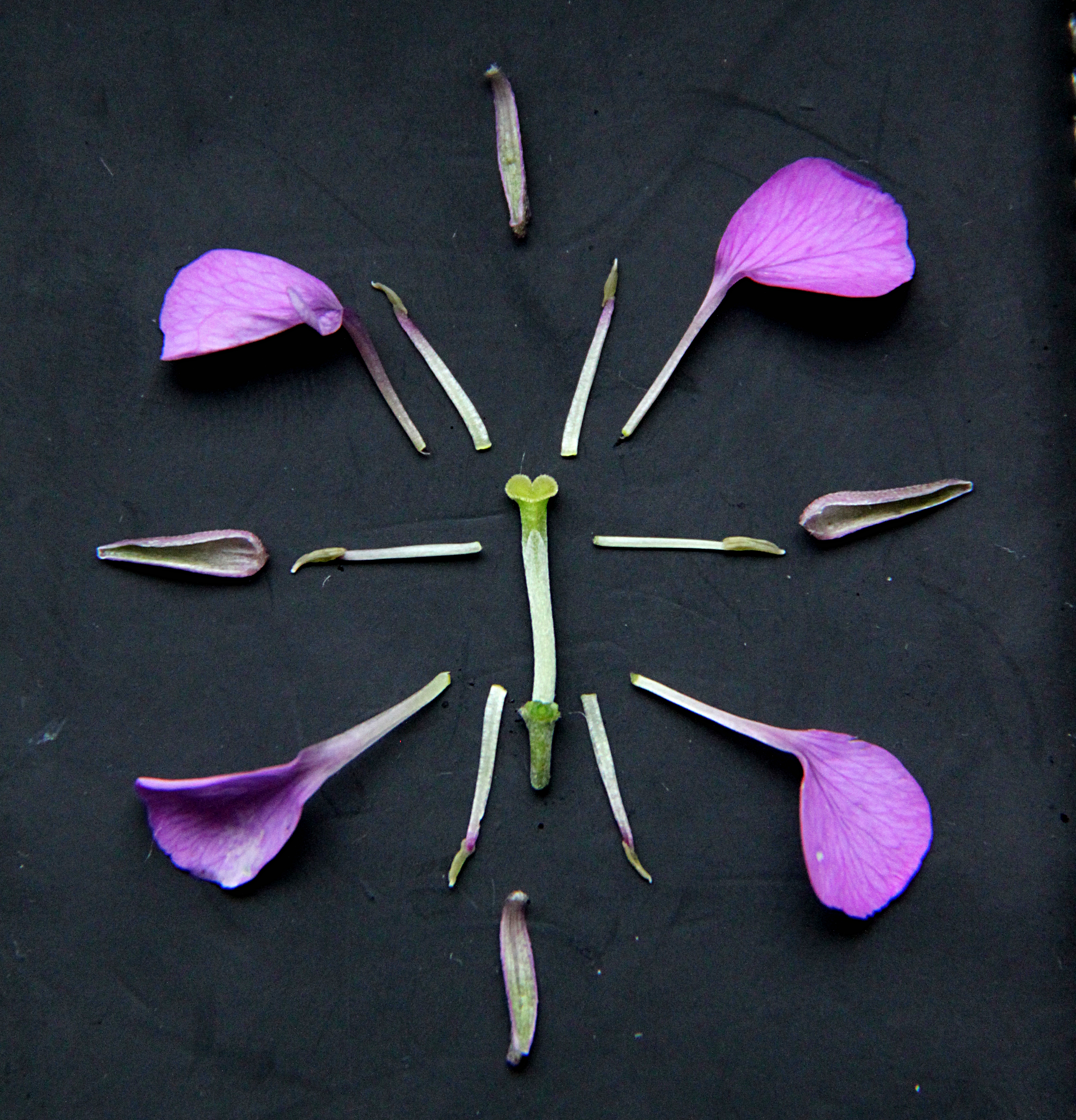
Typical floral diagram of a Brassicaceae (Erysimum "Bowles' Mauve")

Flowers may be arranged in racemes, panicles, or corymbs, with pedicels sometimes in the axil of a bract, and few species have flowers that sit individually on flower stems that spring from the axils of rosette leaves. The orientation of the pedicels when fruits are ripe varies dependent on the species. The flowers are bisexual, star symmetrical (zygomorphic in Iberis and Teesdalia) and the ovary positioned above the other floral parts. Each flower has four free or seldom merged sepals, the lateral two sometimes with a shallow spur, which are mostly shed after flowering, rarely persistent, may be reflexed, spreading, ascending, or erect, together forming a tube-, bell- or urn-shaped calyx. Each flower has four petals, set alternating with the sepals, although in some species these are rudimentary or absent. They may be differentiated into a blade and a claw or not, and consistently lack basal appendages. The blade is entire or has an indent at the tip, and may sometimes be much smaller than the claws. The mostly six stamens are set in two whorls: usually the two lateral, outer ones are shorter than the four inner stamens, but very rarely the stamens can all have the same length, and very rarely species have different numbers of stamens such as sixteen to twenty four in Megacarpaea, four in Cardamine hirsuta, and two in Coronopus. The filaments are slender and not fused, while the anthers consist of two pollen producing cavities, and open with longitudinal slits. The pollen grains are tricolpate. The receptacle carries a variable number of nectaries, but these are always present opposite the base of the lateral stamens.

=== Ovary, fruit and seed ===
There is one superior pistil that consists of two carpels that may either sit directly above the base of the stamens or on a stalk. It initially consists of only one cavity but during its further development a thin wall grows that divides the cavity, both placentas and separates the two valves (a so-called false septum). Rarely, there is only one cavity without a septum. The 2–600 ovules are usually along the side margin of the carpels, or rarely at the top. Fruits are capsules that open with two valves, usually towards the top. These are called silique if at least three times longer than wide, or silicle if the length is less than three times the width. The fruit is very variable in its other traits. There may be one persistent style that connects the ovary to the globular or conical stigma, which is undivided or has two spreading or connivent lobes. The variously shaped seeds are usually yellow or brown in color, and arranged in one or two rows in each cavity. The seed leaves are entire or have a notch at the tip. The seed does not contain endosperm.

=== Differences from similar families ===
Brassicaceae have a bisymmetrical corolla (left is mirrored by right, stem-side by out-side, but each quarter is not symmetrical), a septum dividing the fruit, lack stipules and have simple (although sometimes deeply incised) leaves. The sister family Cleomaceae has bilateral symmetrical corollas (left is mirrored by right, but stem-side is different from out-side), stipules and mostly palmately divided leaves, and mostly no septum. Capparaceae generally have a gynophore, sometimes an androgynophore, and a variable number of stamens.

=== Phytochemistry ===
Almost all Brassicaceae have C3 carbon fixation. The only exceptions are a few Moricandia species, which have a hybrid system between C3 and C4 carbon fixation, C4 fixation being more efficient in drought, high temperature and low nitrate availability. Brassicaceae contain different cocktails of dozens of glucosinolates. They also contain enzymes called myrosinases, that convert the glucosinolates into isothiocyanates, thiocyanates and nitriles, which are toxic to many organisms, and so help guard against herbivory.

== Taxonomy ==
Carl Linnaeus in 1753 regarded the Brassicaceae as a natural group, naming them "Klass" Tetradynamia. Alfred Barton Rendle placed the family in the order Rhoeadales, while George Bentham and Joseph Dalton Hooker in their system published from 1862 to 1883, assigned it to their cohort Parietales (now the class Violales). Following Bentham and Hooker, John Hutchinson in 1948 and again in 1964 thought the Brassicaceae to stem from near the Papaveraceae. In 1994, a group of scientists including Walter Stephen Judd suggested to include the Capparaceae in the Brassicaceae. Early DNA-analysis showed that the Capparaceae—as defined at that moment—were paraphyletic, and it was suggested to assign the genera closest to the Brassicaceae to the Cleomaceae. The Cleomaceae and Brassicaceae diverged approximately 41 million years ago. All three families have consistently been placed in one order (variably called Capparales or Brassicales). The APG II system merged Cleomaceae and Brassicaceae. Other classifications have continued to recognize the Capparaceae, but with a more restricted circumscription, either including Cleome and its relatives in the Brassicaceae or recognizing them in the segregate family Cleomaceae. The APG III system has recently adopted this last solution, but this may change as a consensus arises on this point. Current insights in the relationships of the Brassicaceae, based on a 2012 DNA-analysis, are summarized in the following tree.

- core Brassicales
  - - - - - family Resedaceae
        - family Gyrostemonaceae
      - family Pentadiplandraceae
    - - family Tovariaceae
      - - family Capparaceae
        - - family Cleomaceae
          - family Brassicaceae
  - family Emblingiaceae

=== Relationships within the family ===
Early classifications depended on morphological comparison only, but because of extensive convergent evolution, these do not provide a reliable phylogeny. Although a substantial effort was made through molecular phylogenetic studies, the relationships within the Brassicaceae have not always been well resolved yet. It has long been clear that the Aethionema are sister of the remainder of the family. One analysis from 2014 represented the relation between 39 tribes with the following tree.

As of 2023 the Brassicaceae have been divided into two subfamilies—the Brassicoideae and the Aethionemoideae (containing only Aethionema)—the former of which contains five supertribes, Arabodae, Brassicodae, Camelinodae, Heliophilodae, and Hesperodae.

- Brassicaceae
  - Aethionemae
  - - - - - Megacarpaeeae
          - Heliophileae
        - - Coluteocarpeae
          - Conringieae
        - - - Buniadeae
            - Kernereae
          - Schizopetaleae
        - - Thlaspideae
          - - - - Isatideae
                - Sisymbrieae
              - Brassiceae
              - Thelypodieae
            - Eutremeae
        - - Calepineae
          - - - Biscutelleae
              - Arabideae
            - - Cochlearieae
              - - Anchonieae
                - - - - Hesperideae
                      - Anastaticeae
                    - - Dontostemoneae
                      - Chorisporeae
                  - Euclidieae
        - Iberideae
      - - Erysimeae
        - - - - - Lepidieae
                - Smelowskieae
              - - Yinshanieae
                - Descurainieae
            - - Camelinieae
              - - - Boechereae
                  - - Oreophytoneae
                    - Halimolobeae
                - - Physarieae
                  - Crucihimalayeae
          - Cardamineae
    - Alysseae

=== Genera ===
As of September 2025, Plants of the World Online accepted 354 genera. The largest genera are Draba (430 species), Erysimum (270 species), Lepidium (264 species), Cardamine (264 species), and Alyssum (112 species). Over 4,300 species are accepted.

=== Etymology ===
The name Brassicaceae comes to international scientific vocabulary from Neo-Latin, from Brassica, the type genus, + -aceae, a standardized suffix for plant family names in modern taxonomy. The genus name comes from the Classical Latin word brassica, referring to cabbage and other cruciferous vegetables. The alternative older name, Cruciferae, meaning "cross-bearing", describes the four petals of mustard flowers, which resemble a cross. Cruciferae is one of eight plant family names, not derived from a genus name and without the suffix -aceae that are authorized alternative names.

== Distribution ==
Brassicaceae can be found almost on the entire land surface of the planet, but the family is absent from Antarctica, and also absent from some areas in the tropics, i.e. northeastern Brazil, the Congo Basin, Maritime Southeast Asia and tropical Australasia. The area of origin of the family is possibly the Irano-Turanian Region, where approximately 900 species occur in 150 different genera. About 530 of those 900 species are endemics. Next in abundance comes the Mediterranean region, with around 630 species (290 of which are endemic) in 113 genera. The family is less prominent in the Saharo-Arabian region—65 genera, 180 species of which 62 are endemic—and North America (comprising the North American Atlantic region and the Rocky Mountain floristic region)—99 genera, 780 species of which 600 are endemic. South America has 40 genera containing 340 native species, Southern Africa 15 genera with over 100 species, and Australia and New Zealand have 19 genera with 114 species between them.

== Ecology ==
Brassicaceae are almost exclusively pollinated by insects. A chemical mechanism in the pollen is active in many species to avoid selfing. Two notable exceptions are exclusive self-pollination in closed flowers in Cardamine chenopodifolia, and wind pollination in Pringlea antiscorbutica. Although it can be cross-pollinated, Alliaria petiolata (garlic mustard) is self-fertile. Most species reproduce sexually through seed, but Cardamine bulbifera produces gemmae and in others, such as Cardamine pentaphyllos, the coral-like roots easily break into segments, that will grow into separate plants. In some species, such as in the genus Cardamine, seed pods open with force and so catapult the seeds quite far. Many of these have sticky seed coats, assisting long-distance dispersal by organisms such as animals, and this may also explain several intercontinental dispersal events in the genus, and its near global distribution. Brassicaceae are common on serpentine and dolomite rich in magnesium. Over a hundred species in the family accumulate heavy metals, particularly zinc and nickel, which is a record percentage. Several Alyssum species can accumulate nickel up to 0.3% of their dry weight, and may be useful in soil remediation or even bio-mining.

Brassicaceae contain glucosinolates as well as myrosinases inside their cells. When the cell is damaged, the myrosinases hydrolise the glucosinolates, leading to the synthesis of isothiocyanates, which are compounds toxic to most animals, fungi and bacteria. Some insect herbivores have developed counter adaptations such as rapid absorption of the glucosinates, quick alternative breakdown into non-toxic compounds and avoiding cell damage. In the whites family (Pieridae), one counter mechanism involves glucosinolate sulphatase, which changes the glucosinolate, so that it cannot be converted to isothiocyanate. A second is that the glucosinates are quickly broken down, forming nitriles. Differences between the mixtures of glucosinolates between species and even within species is large, and individual plants may produce in excess of fifty individual substances. The energy penalty for synthesising all these glucosinolates may be as high as 15% of the total needed to produce a leaf. Barbarea vulgaris (bittercress) also produces triterpenoid saponins. These adaptations and counter adaptations probably have led to extensive diversification in both the Brassicaceae and one of its major pests, the butterfly family Pieridae. A particular cocktail of volatile glucosinates triggers egg-laying in many species. Thus a particular crop can sometimes be protected by planting bittercress as a deadly bait, for the saponins kill the caterpillars, but the butterfly is still lured by the bittercress to lay its egg on the leaves. A moth that feeds on a range of Brassicaceae is the diamondback moth (Plutella xylostella). Like the Pieridae, it is capable of converting isothiocyanates into less problematic nitriles. Managing this pest in crops became more complicated after resistance developed against a toxin produced by Bacillus thuringiensis, which is used as a wide spectrum biological plant protection against caterpillars. Parasitoid wasps that feed on such insect herbivores are attracted to the chemical compounds released by the plants, and thus are able to locate their prey. The cabbage aphid (Brevicoryne brassicae) stores glucosinolates and synthesises its own myrosinases, which may deter its potential predators.

Since its introduction in the 19th century, Alliaria petiolata has been extremely successful as an invasive species in temperate North America due, in part, to its secretion of allelopathic chemicals. These inhibit the germination of most competing plants and kill beneficial soil fungi needed by many plants, such as many tree species, to successfully see their seedlings grow to maturity. The monoculture formation of an herb layer carpet by this plant has been shown to dramatically alter forests, making them wetter, having fewer and fewer trees, and having more vines such as poison ivy (Toxicodendron radicans). The overall herb layer biodiversity is also drastically reduced, particularly in terms of sedges and forbs. Research has found that removing 80% of the garlic mustard infestation plants did not lead to a particularly significant recovery of that diversity. Instead, it required around 100% removal. Given that not one of an estimated 76 species that prey on the plant has been approved for biological control in North America and the variety of mechanisms the plant has to ensure its dominance without them (e.g. high seed production, self-fertility, allelopathy, spring growth that occurs before nearly all native plants, roots that break easily when pulling attempts are made, a complete lack of palatability for herbivores at all life stages, etc.) it is unlikely that such a high level of control can be established and maintained on the whole. It is estimated that adequate control can be achieved with the introduction of two European weevils, including one that is monophagous. The USDA's TAG group has blocked these introductions since 2004. In addition to being invasive, garlic mustard also is a threat to native North American Pieris butterflies such as P. oleracea, as they preferentially oviposit on it, although it is toxic to their larvae.

Invasive aggressive mustard species are known for being self-fertile, seeding very heavily with small seeds that have a lengthy lifespan coupled with a very high rate of viability and germination, and for being completely unpalatable to both herbivores and insects in areas to which they are not native. Garlic mustard is toxic to several rarer North American Pieris species.

== Uses ==
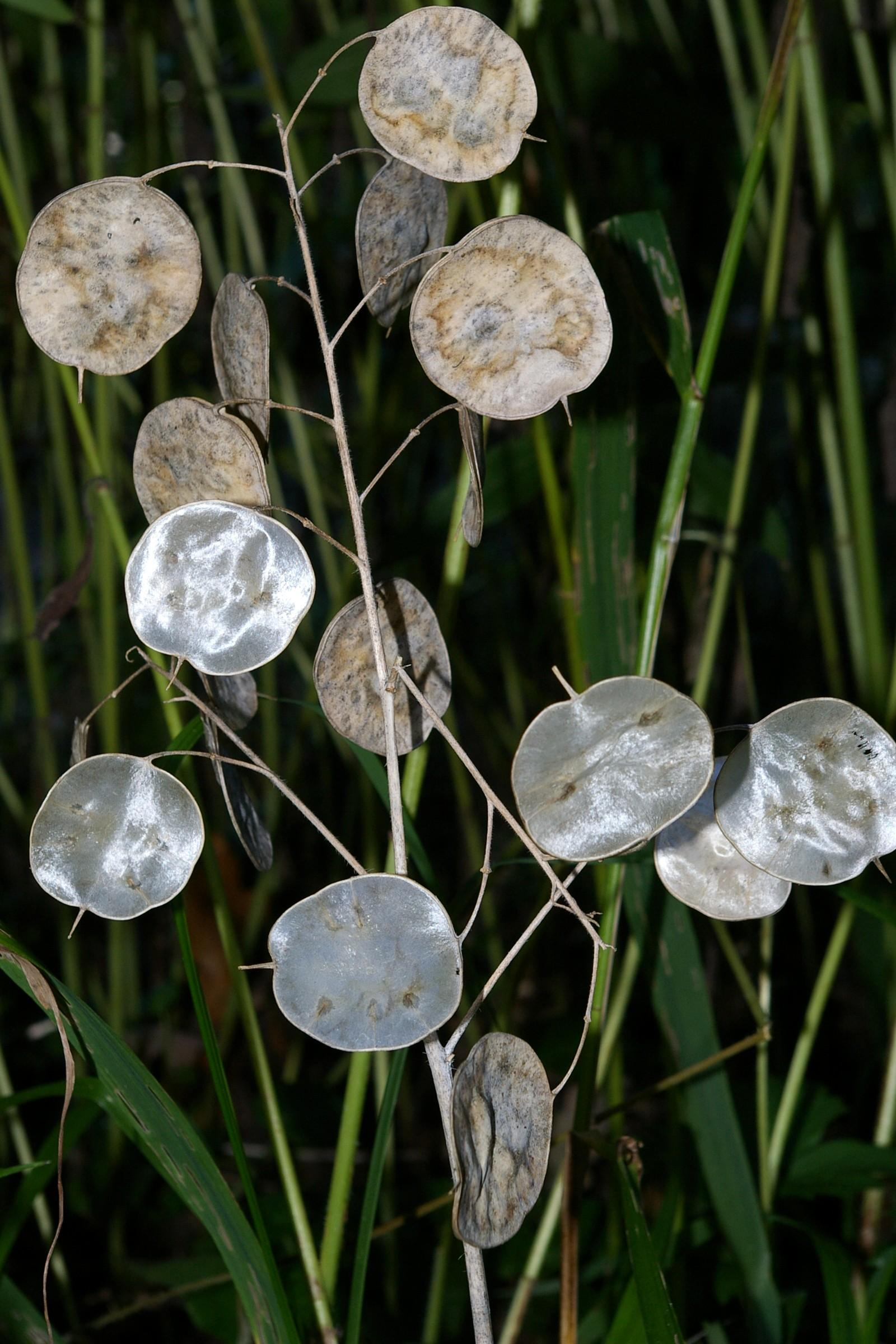
Lunaria annua with dry walls of the fruit

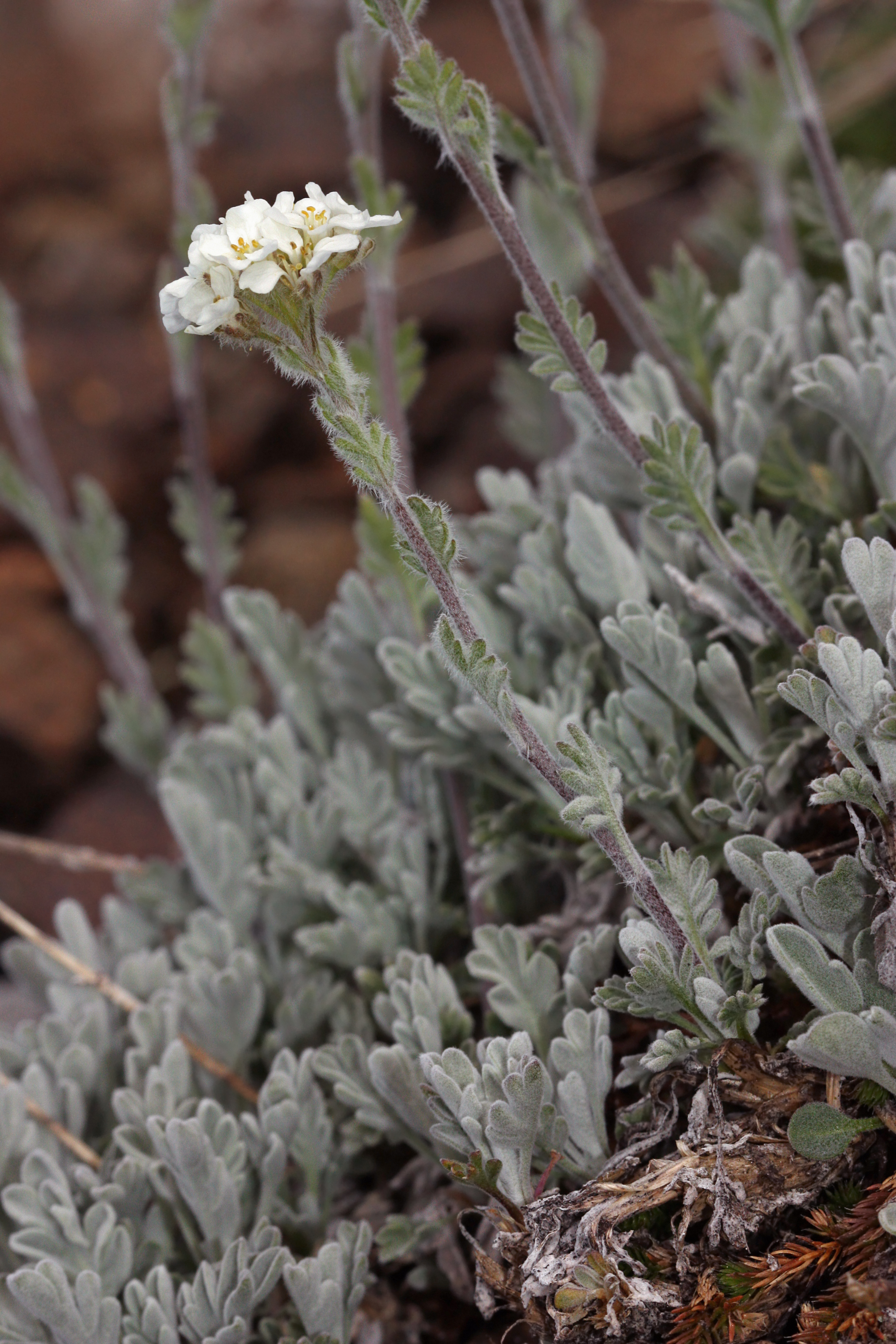
Smelowskia americana is endemic to the midlatitude mountains of western North America.

This family includes important agricultural crops, among which many vegetables such as cabbage, broccoli, cauliflower, kale, Brussels sprouts, collard greens, Savoy, kohlrabi, and gai lan (Brassica oleracea), turnip, napa cabbage, mizuna, bok choy and rapini (Brassica rapa), rocket salad/arugula (Eruca sativa), garden cress (Lepidium sativum), watercress (Nasturtium officinale) and radish (Raphanus) and a few spices like horseradish (Armoracia rusticana), wasabi (Eutrema japonicum), white, brown and black mustard (Sinapis alba, Brassica juncea and B. nigra respectively). Vegetable oil is produced from the seeds of several species such as Brassica napus (rapeseed oil), perhaps providing the largest volume of vegetable oils of any species. Woad (Isatis tinctoria) was used in the past to produce a blue textile dye (indigo), but has largely been replaced by the same substance from unrelated tropical species like Indigofera tinctoria.

Pringlea antiscorbutica, commonly known as Kerguelen cabbage, is edible, containing high levels of potassium. Its leaves contain a vitamin C-rich oil, a fact which, in the days of sailing ships, made it very attractive to sailors suffering from scurvy, hence the species name's epithet antiscorbutica, which means "against scurvy" in Low Latin. It was essential to the diets of the whalers on Kerguelen when pork, beef, or seal meat was used up.

The Brassicaceae also includes ornamentals, such as species of Aethionema, Alyssum, Arabis, Aubrieta, Aurinia, Cheiranthus, Erysimum, Hesperis, Iberis, Lobularia, Lunaria, Malcolmia, and Matthiola. Honesty (Lunaria annua) is cultivated for the decorative value of the translucent remains of the fruits after drying. It can be a pest species in areas where it is not native.

The small Eurasian weed Arabidopsis thaliana is widely used as model organism in the study of the molecular biology of flowering plants (Angiospermae).

Some species are useful as food plants for Lepidoptera, such as certain wild mustard and cress species, such as Turritis glabra and Boechera laevigata that are utilized by several North American butterflies.

== Gallery ==
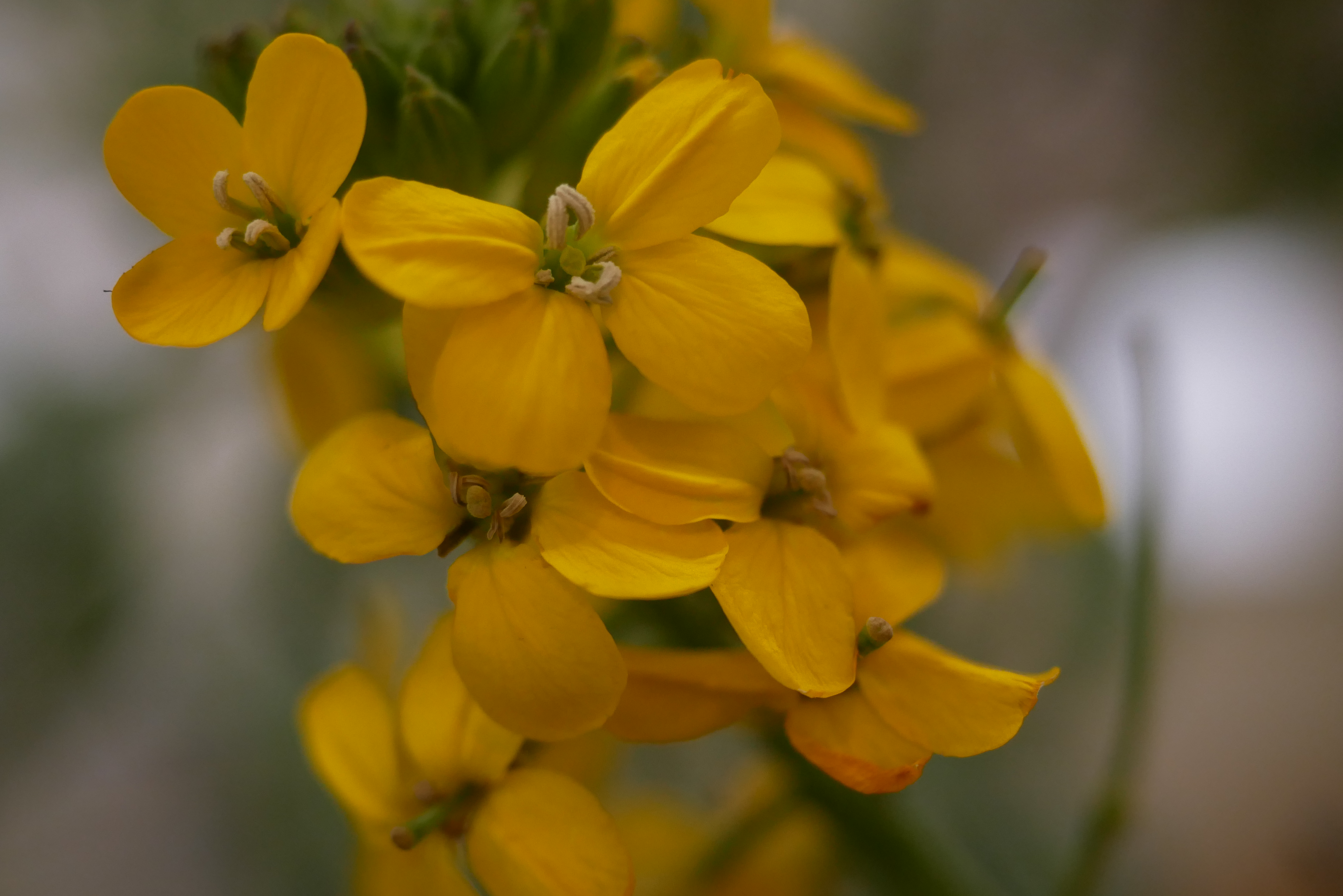
Coast/sand-loving wallflower Erysimum ammophilum

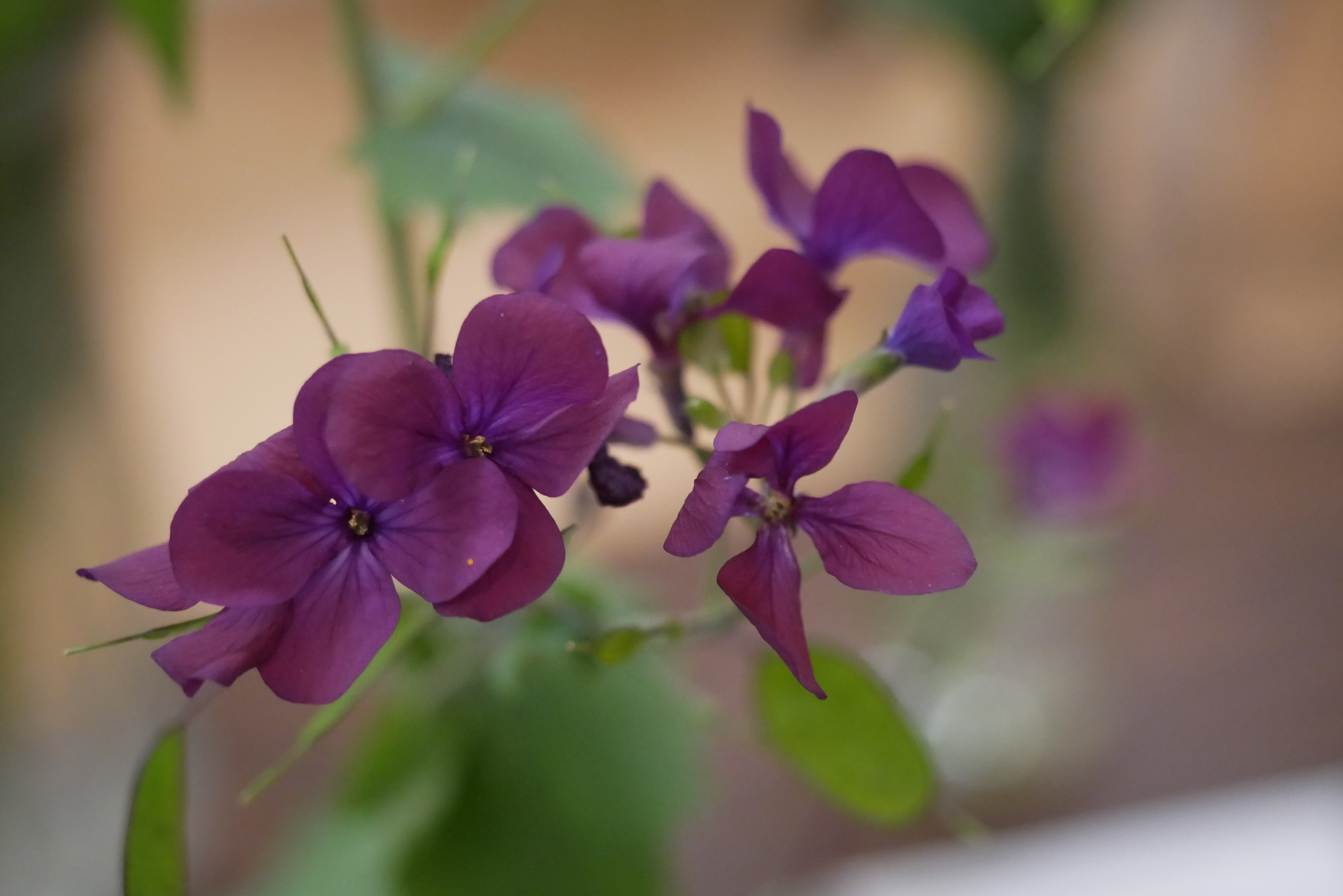
Honesty Lunaria annua

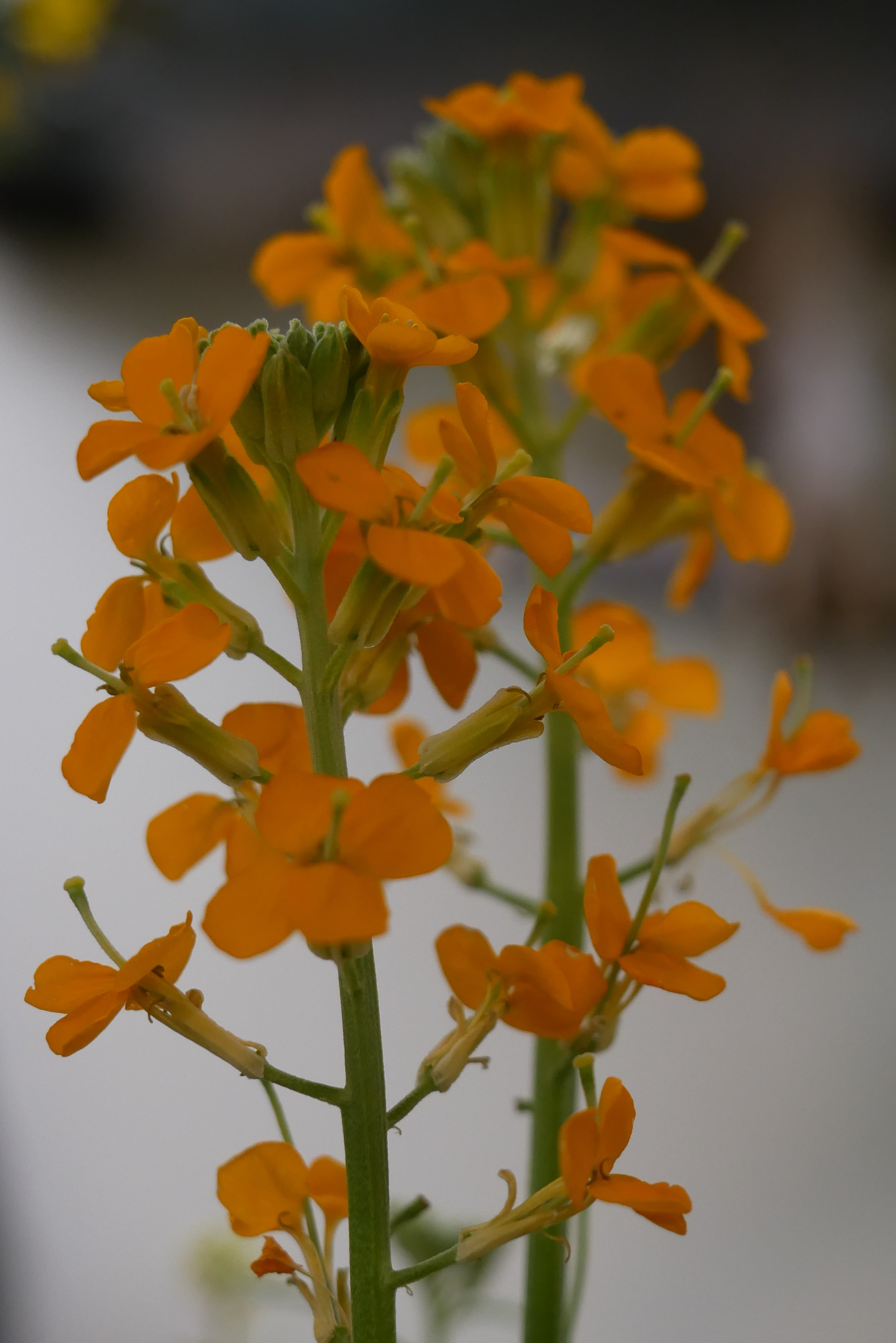
Western wallflower Erysimum capitatum var. capitatum
