= Cress =

Cress or CRESS may refer to one or more of the following:

== Plants ==
Plants cultivated for their edible leaves:

- Garden cress, Lepidium sativum
- Land cress, Barbarea verna
- Watercress, Nasturtium officinale

Other plants not usually cultivated or consumed:

- Bittercress, Cardamine species, or others
- Gladecress, Leavenworthia species
- Hoary cress, Lepidium draba
- Peppercress, Lepidium species
- Rockcress, several genera
- Swinecress or wartcress, Coronopus
- Thale cress, Arabidopsis thaliana
- Winter cress, Barbarea
- Yellowcress, several genera

== People ==
- Cress Williams (born 1968), African American film and television actor
- Curt Cress (born 1952), German drummer and composer
- Frances Cress Welsing (1935–2016), African American psychiatrist
- Fred Cress (1938–2009), Australian artist
- George Oscar Cress (1862–1954), United States military officer
- Paul H. Cress (1939–2004), Canadian computer scientist
- Roman William Cress (born 1977), Marshallese athlete

== Other uses ==
- Cress (novel), a novel by Marissa Meyer
- CRESS: Centre for Research in Social Simulation, at the Department of Sociology, University of Surrey, funded by Nigel Gilbert
- Cress, the name of the fictional Moon Kingdom in the 1997 platform game Klonoa: Door to Phantomile for the PlayStation
- Cress (Pokémon), a character from the Pokemon series

== See also ==
- Cres (disambiguation)
- Kress (disambiguation)
