= Project 8 =

Project 8 may refer to:

- Tony Hawk's Project 8, a skateboarding video game released in 2006
- Northern Super League, a Canadian women's soccer league first announced as Project 8
- Project 8, an international electron antineutrino mass experiment
- Project 8, a district in Quezon City, the Philippines, composed of the barangays Bahay Toro, Baesa, and Sangandaan
  - Project 8 Projects, a Filipino film and television production company named after the district, which co-produced films such as Alone/Together (2019)
- Jaguar XE SV Project 8, a limited-edition version of the Jaguar XE released in 2017
- Project 8 Winery, a proposed 42-acre winery in Placer County, California

== See also ==
- Lion's Gate Project 8
