= Kress =

Kress may refer to:

== Places ==
- Kress, Texas, a city in north Texas
- Kress (Columbus, Georgia), a National Register of Historic Places listing in Muscogee County, Georgia
- Kress, Virginia, an unincorporated community located in Brunswick County

== Samuel Kress and his organizations ==
- Samuel H. Kress, a businessman, founder of the organizations in this section
- S. H. Kress & Co., a former chain of "five and dime" stores in the United States
- Tiendas Kress, the former Puerto Rico subsidiary selling women's clothing
- The Samuel H. Kress Foundation, which holds and disposes of his large art collection

== People ==
- Colette Kress (born 1967), American business executive
- Daniel H. Kress (1862–1956), Canadian physician, husband of Lauretta Kress below
- Eric Kress (born 1962), Danish cinematographer
- Friedrich Freiherr Kress von Kressenstein (1870–1948), German general in World War I
- Gunther Kress (1940–2019), British academic
- Lauretta E. Kress (1863–1955), Canadian-American physician, wife of Daniel Kress above
- Nancy Kress (born 1948), American science fiction writer
- Nathan Kress (born 1992), American actor
- Stephen W. Kress, founder of Project Puffin
- Viktor Kress (born 1948), governor of Tomsk Oblast, Russia
- W. John Kress (born 1951), American botanist
- Wilhelm Kress (1836–1913), Austrian aviation pioneer

== See also ==
- List of S. H. Kress and Co. buildings
- Kress Corporation
- Kress (brand), a brand of Positec
- Kreß (disambiguation)
- Cress (disambiguation)
