= Cres (disambiguation) =

Cres is an island in the Adriatic in Croatia.

Cres or CRES may also refer to:

- Cres (town), a town on the eponymous island
- Cres (mythology), a term in Greek mythology
- Georges Crès, French editor and bookseller

== Acronyms ==
- CRES, the Center For Renewable Energy Sources, Greek agency for energy efficiency in Europe
- CRes, Center of resistance, in orthodontics
- Citizens for Responsible Energy Solutions, United States
- CRES, Corrosion-resistant steel
- CRES, the Socialized Economy Regulatory Council in 20th century Valencia, Spain

== See also ==
- Le Crès
- Kres (disambiguation)
- Cress (disambiguation)
