= Front loop =

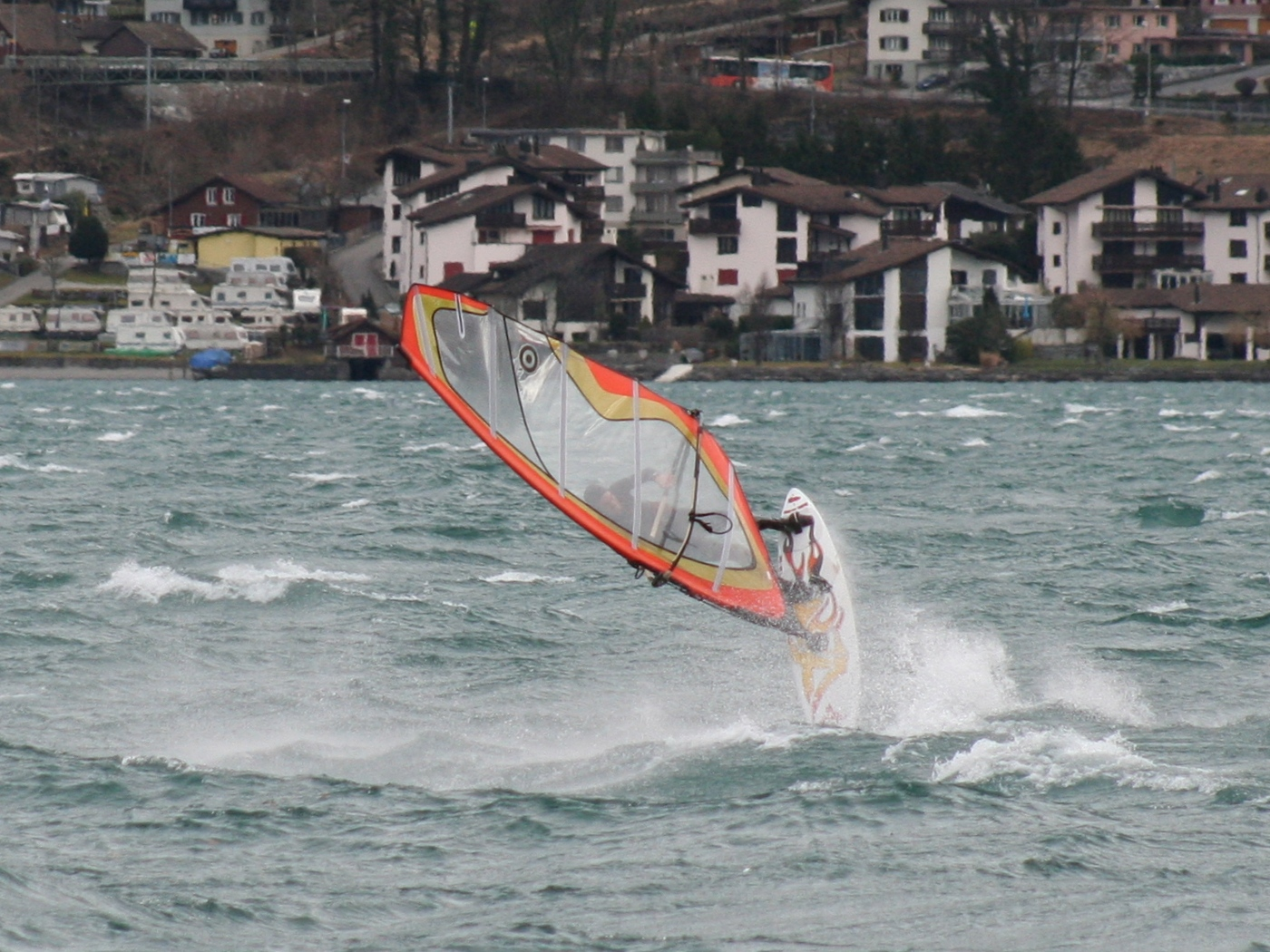
Windsurfer performing a forward loop (January 2006)

Front loop is the name given to a trick performed by a windsurfer (also known as a forward loop) whereby the rider performs a jump from a wave face and forces the sail, board and rider to perform a forward somersault in one motion. In its basic form, the rider's hands maintain their position on the boom and the rider's feet maintain their position on the board. Some consider the forward loop to be one of the harder intermediate moves to learn as it goes against most learned reactions whilst sailing.

== Physics ==
The rotational motion occurs when the center of resistance is removed by jumping the board off the water and the center of effort of the sail has been moved forward of the system's center of mass

== Execution ==
=== Initiation ===
Front loops may be initiated, unhooked, from close-hauled through broad-reach points of sail, with ease of initiation often determined by wave-face rather than wind direction.

To properly position the center of effort, the rider typically moves their body from a windward sailing position to a position toward the back and centerline of the board. The forward leg will often be straightened—the rear leg bent. To achieve this position, the sail will have been sheeted out slightly during the motion. The rider's rear hand will often move further back on the boom to assist in proper placement of center of effort and sheeting-in later.

Next, the board is jumped from the water, by straightening the rear leg, with the nose of the board commonly 45 degrees higher than the tail as it leaves the water. To assist rotation, and depending upon the desired initiation time of the rotation of the loop, the board may be carved (turned) downwind as it is jumped, and the bottom surface may be tilted about a longitudinal axis to expose it to the wind.

To prepare for maximum speed of rotation, the rider next moves the center of effort of the sail as far away from their center of mass as possible. Starting with the sail held close to the body, the sail is moved (in its current plane) to windward until the forward arm is extended. This motion is most easily accomplished prior to sheeting-in. For maximum extension, the torso may be arched toward the mast as well.

When the rider wishes to initiate center of effort rotation, the sail is sheeted in. Some feel that looking at the clew at this point assists rotation.

== Variations ==
The axis of rotation determines whether the maneuver is a forward-loop, spin-loop, or cheese-roll. Other variations depend upon the "ramp" from which the rider performs the maneuver, with large wave faces allowing double or triple-loops and accomplished "loopers" performing spin-loops off of flat water.

A double forward is an innovation of this move, it involves two full rotations of board and sail in the air.

Variations include:

- Forward loop—same as front loop
- Double loop
- Triple loop
- Spin loop
- Flat-water loop
- Cheese roll
- Wymaroo
- Front loop off the lip
- Front loop hooked in
- Front loop one footed
- Table top into forward

== Risks ==
Learning to do a front loop may have more perceived than actual risks. With the axis of rotation nearly vertical, the rider's hands remaining on the boom, and the board heading downwind at initiation, there is little danger of landing on the equipment. While learning, it is possible to tear top monofilm panels of a sail without X-Ply if the front of the mast drives hard into the water during the rotation.

Landing incorrectly from higher loops can break the board in half. Sailers who do not angle the sail enough for the rotation could lands on their side and could blow out their ear drum .

== History ==
The double forward was made famous by Robert Teriitehau and perfected by Ricardo Campello. It is now a commonly performed move in competition.
