= Farrel O'Shea =

British windsurfer (1963–2024)

O'Shea in 2010

O'Shea, 2010

Farrel O'Shea (3 August 1963 – 2 June 2024) was a British professional windsurfer. He holds the British speed sailing record for all sail powered craft, as recognised by the World Sailing Speed Record Council.

Originally from Wellington, Shropshire, O'Shea settled in the Gwynedd area of Wales. He rose to fame in the mid 1980s as a radical wave sailor; the UK's most media friendly windsurfer of the period, one of the first Europeans to perform the holy grail of windsurfing moves the front loop. Three times UK wave sailing vice champion he had successful career in speed sailing between 1986 and 1990.

O'Shea wrote three books on windsurfing, including the global best seller an Introduction to Windsurfing in 1988. Persuaded out of retirement by Dave White in 2006, he rejoined the professional ISWC Speed World Cup tour. He broke the prestigious UK 500 m speed sailing record on 5 March 2008 during the Masters of speed event at St Marie de la Mer, France, achieving 44.34 knots, beating the previous record held by Dave White.

With a trend towards GPS timing and a global speed ladder, O'Shea achieved second fastest speed in 2008, 8th in 2009 and 3rd worldwide in 2010, the highest placed UK athlete.

O'Shea lived and trained in Abersoch, North Wales. He died suddenly in La Palme, Aude, France on 2 June 2024, at the age of 60.
