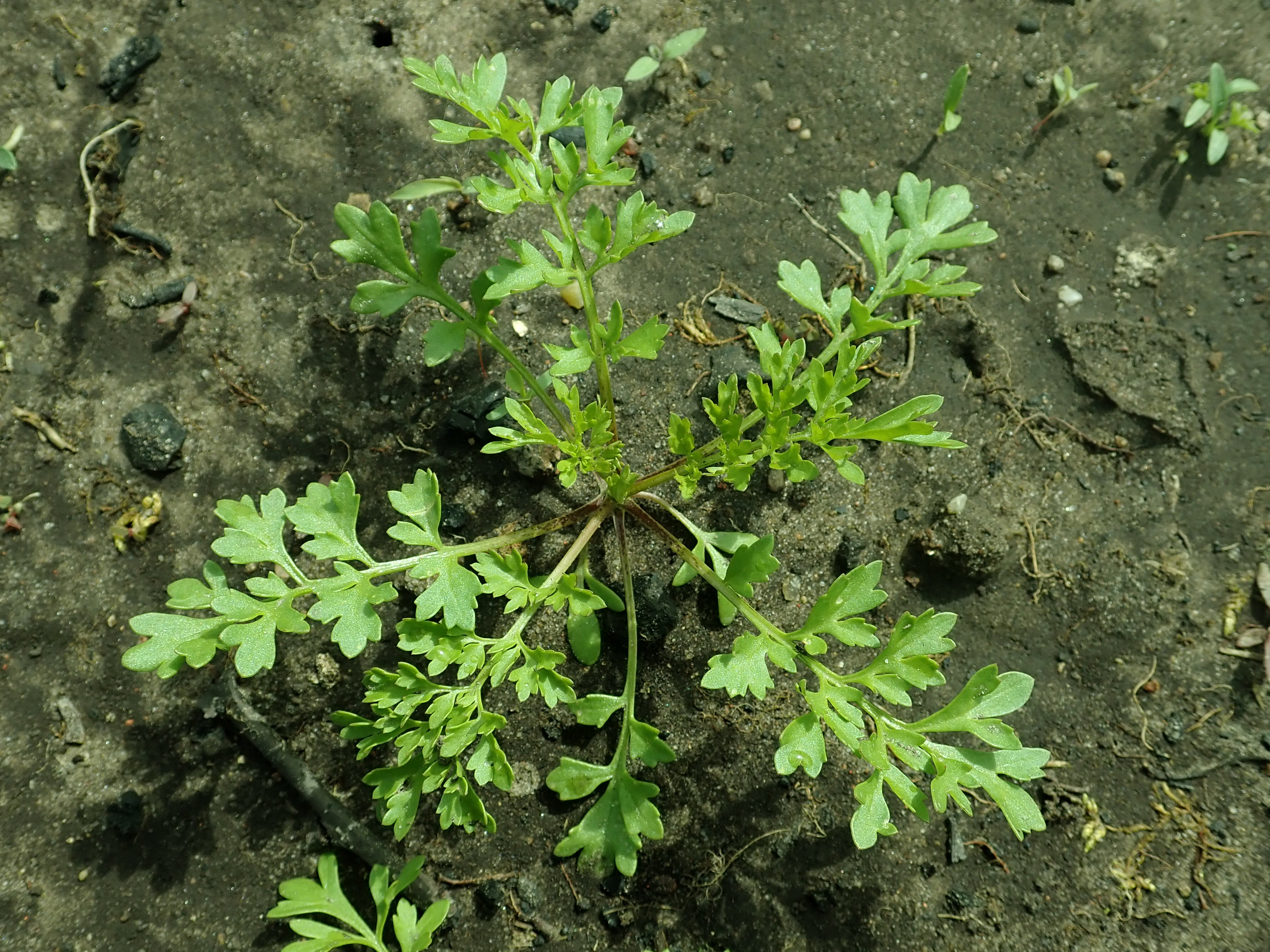
- One mature Lepidium sativum rosette

Scientific classification
- Kingdom: Plantae
- Clade: Tracheophytes
- Clade: Angiosperms
- Clade: Eudicots
- Clade: Rosids
- Order: Brassicales
- Family: Brassicaceae
- Genus: Lepidium
- Species: L. sativum

Binomial name
- Lepidium sativum L.

Synonyms
- Arabis chinensis Rottler ex Wight; Cardamon sativum (L.) Fourr.; Crucifera nasturtium E.H.L.Krause; Lepia sativa (L.) Desv.; Lepidium sativum var. spinescens (DC.) Jafri; Lepidium spinescens DC.; Nasturtium crispum Medik.; Nasturtium sativum (L.) Moench; Nasturtium spinescens (DC.) Kuntze; Thlaspi sativum (L.) Crantz; Thlaspidium sativum (L.) Spach

= Garden cress =

Species of edible herb

Cress (Lepidium sativum), sometimes referred to as garden cress (or curly cress) to distinguish it from similar plants also referred to as cress (from Old English cresse), is a fast-growing, edible herb.

Garden cress is genetically related to watercress and mustard, sharing their peppery, tangy flavour and aroma. In some regions, garden cress is known as mustard and cress, garden pepper cress, pepperwort, pepper grass, or poor man's pepper.

This annual plant can reach a height of 60 cm (24 in), with many branches on the upper part. The white to pinkish flowers are only 2 mm (1/16 in) across, clustered in small branched racemes.

Cress is a high-nutrient food containing substantial content of vitamins A, C and K and several dietary minerals.

== In agriculture ==
Cultivation of cress is practical both on mass scales and on the individual scale. Garden cress is suitable for hydroponic cultivation and thrives in slightly alkaline water. In many local markets, the demand for hydroponically grown cress can exceed available supply, partially because cress leaves are not suitable for distribution in dried form, so they can only be partially preserved. Consumers commonly acquire cress as seed or (in Europe) from markets as boxes of young live shoots.

Edible shoots are typically harvested in one to two weeks after planting, when they are 5–13 cm (2–5 in) tall.

== Culinary uses ==
Garden cress is added to soups, sandwiches and salads for its tangy flavour. It is also eaten as sprouts, and the fresh or dried seed pods can be used as a peppery seasoning (haloon). In the United Kingdom, cut cress shoots are commonly used in sandwiches with boiled eggs and mayonnaise.

Garden cress, raw
Nutritional value per 100 g (3.5 oz)
- Energy: 134 kJ (32 kcal)
- Carbohydrates: 5.5 g
- Sugars: 4.4 g
- Dietary fiber: 1.1 g
- Fat: 0.7 g
- Protein: 2.6 g
Vitamins and minerals
Vitamins	Quantity %DV^{†}
Vitamin A equiv. beta-Carotene lutein zeaxanthin	38% 346 μg 38% 4150 μg 12500 μg
Thiamine (B1)	7% 0.08 mg
Riboflavin (B2)	20% 0.26 mg
Niacin (B3)	6% 1 mg
Pantothenic acid (B5)	5% 0.247 mg
Vitamin B6	15% 0.247 mg
Folate (B9)	20% 80 μg
Vitamin C	77% 69 mg
Vitamin E	5% 0.7 mg
Vitamin K	452% 541.9 μg
Minerals	Quantity %DV^{†}
Calcium	6% 81 mg
Iron	7% 1.3 mg
Magnesium	9% 38 mg
Manganese	24% 0.553 mg
Phosphorus	6% 76 mg
Potassium	20% 606 mg
- Other constituents: Quantity
- Water: 89.4 g
- Full Link to USDA Database entry
- ^{†}Percentages estimated using US recommendations for adults, except for potassium, which is estimated based on expert recommendation from the National Academies.

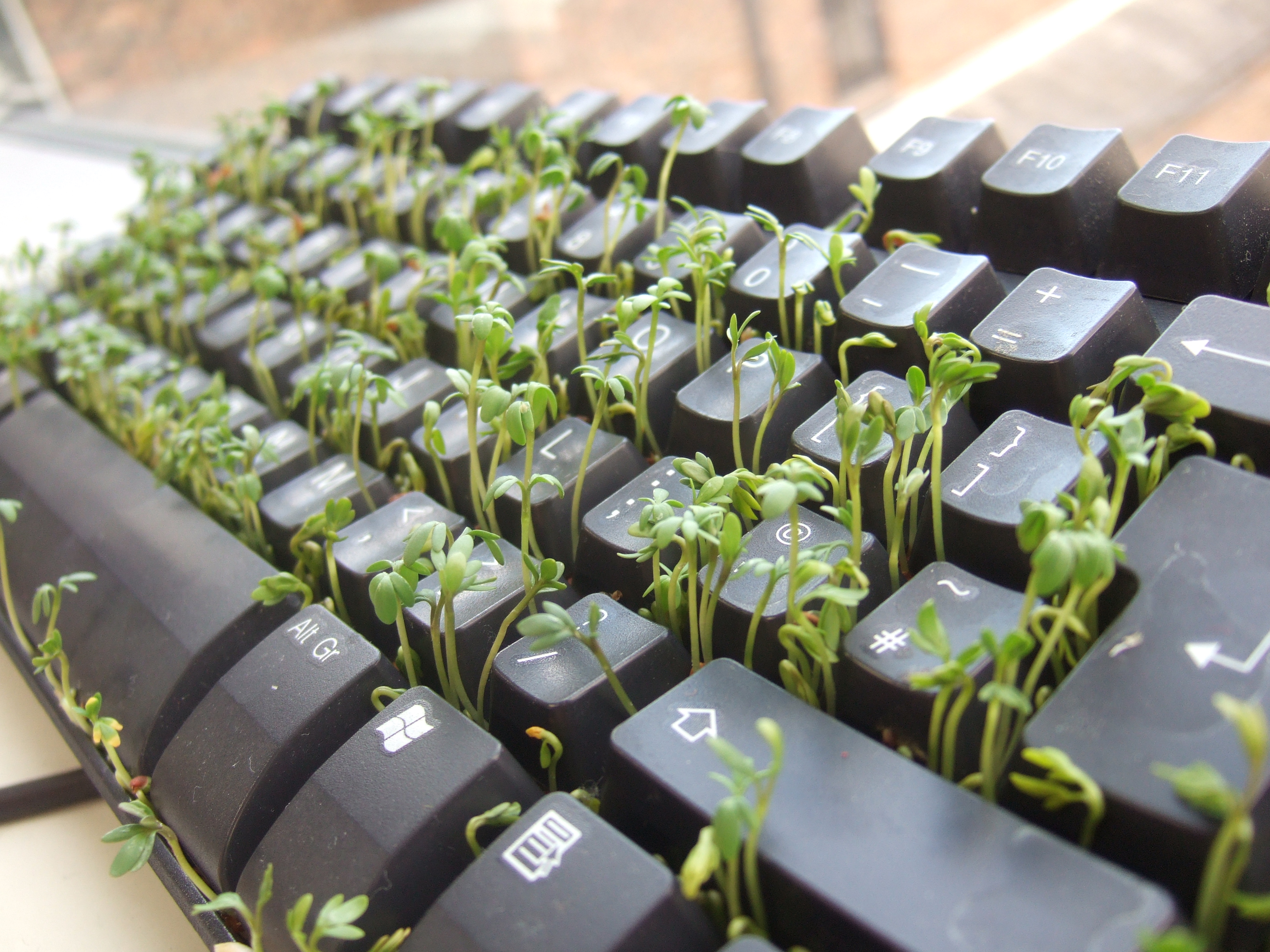
Garden cress can grow almost anywhere.

== Nutrition ==
Raw cress is 89% water, 6% carbohydrates (including 1% dietary fiber), 3% protein and less than 1% fat (table). In a 100-gram (3 1/2-ounce) reference quantity, raw cress supplies 134 kilojoules (32 kilocalories) of food energy and numerous nutrients in significant content, including vitamin K (516% of the Daily Value, DV), vitamin C (83% DV) and vitamin A (43% DV). Among dietary minerals, manganese levels are high (26% DV) while several others, including potassium and magnesium, are in moderate content (table).

== Other uses ==
Garden cress, known as chandrashoor, and the seeds, known as aaliv or aleev in Marathi, or halloon in India, are commonly used in the system of Ayurveda. It is also known as asario in India and the Middle East where it is prized as a medicinal herb, called habbat al hamra (literally red seeds) in Arabic. In the Arabian Peninsula, the seeds are traditionally mixed with custard to make a hot drink.

L. sativum is often used in experiments to teach biology to students in schools. The plant grows readily on damp paper or cotton, and its fast germination and development time make it useful in demonstrating plant growth.

== Gallery ==
Timelapse of garden cress sprouting.

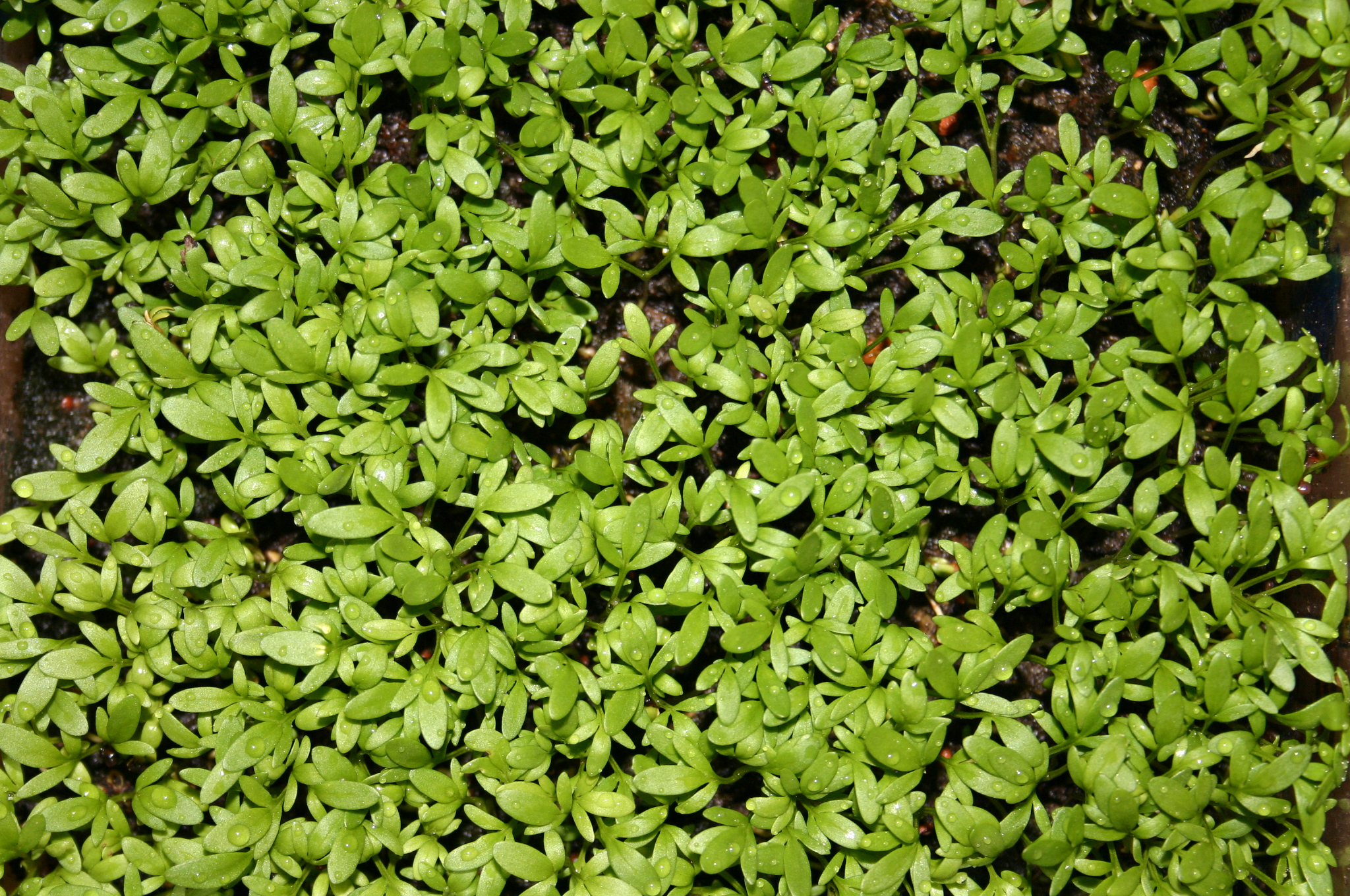
Young Lepidium sativum seedlings

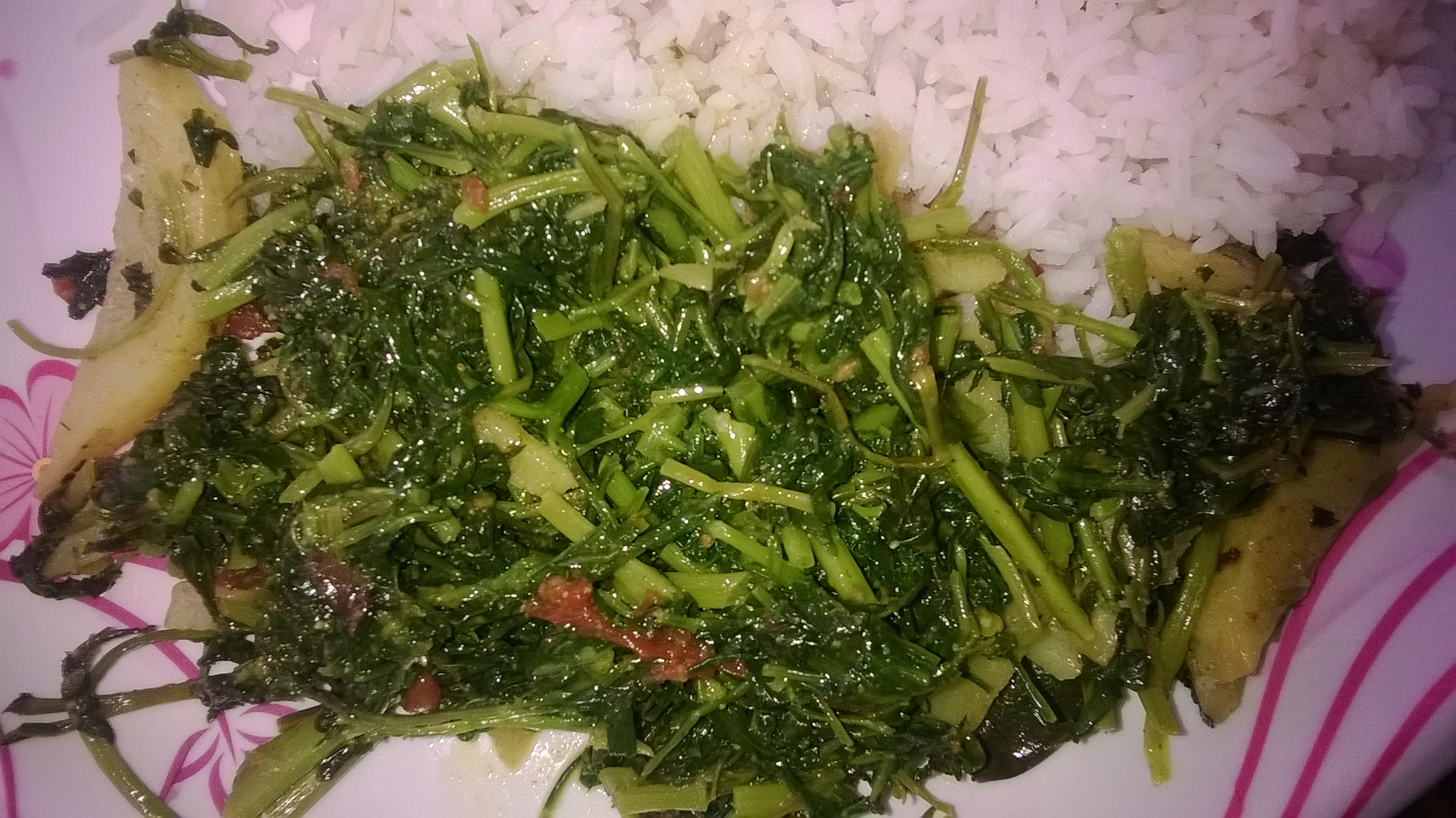
Garden cress saag (known as chamsur in Nepali) is a popular dish in Nepalese cuisine.

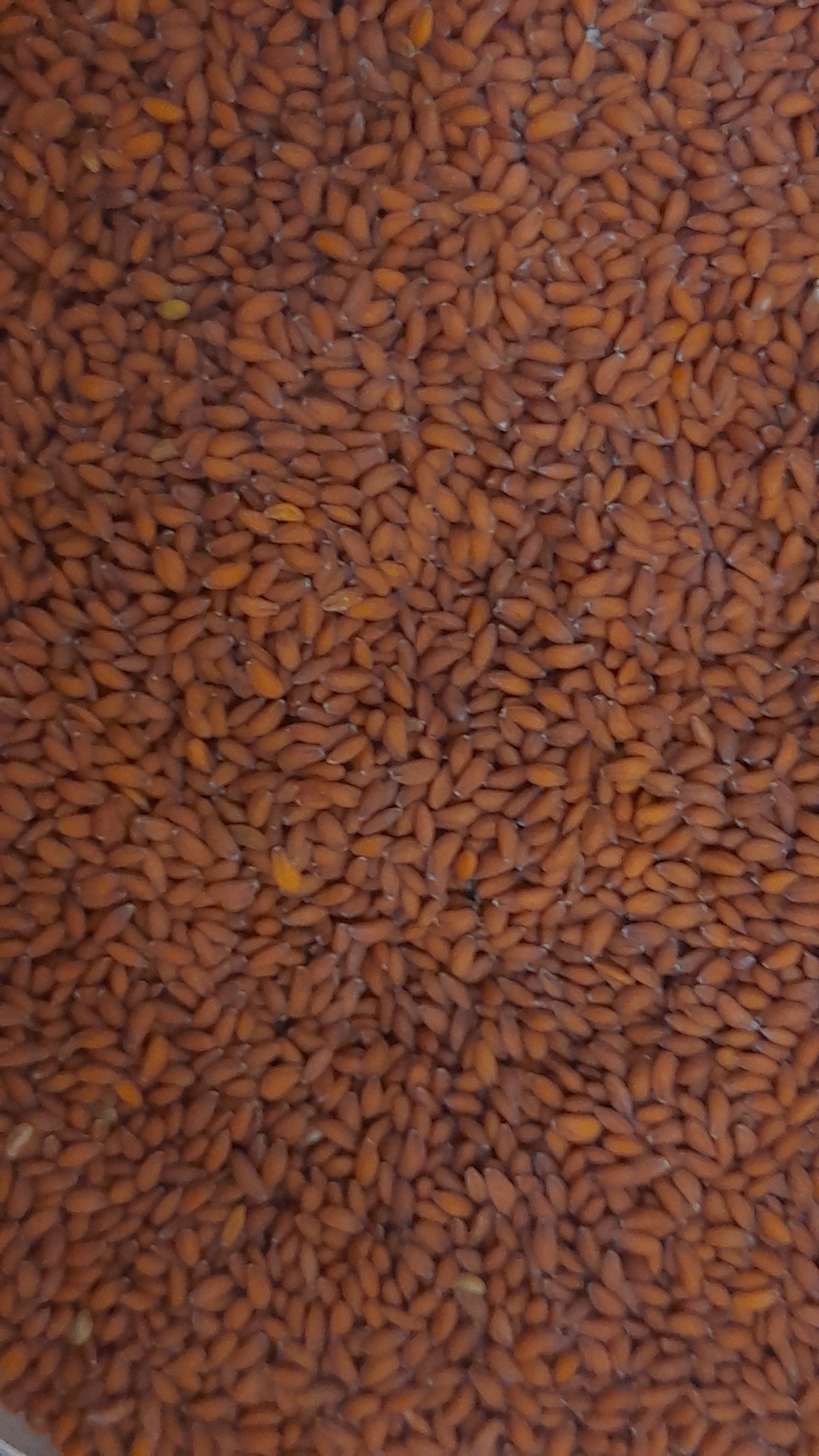
The seeds of garden cress

== See also ==
- List of vegetables
- Watercress soup
