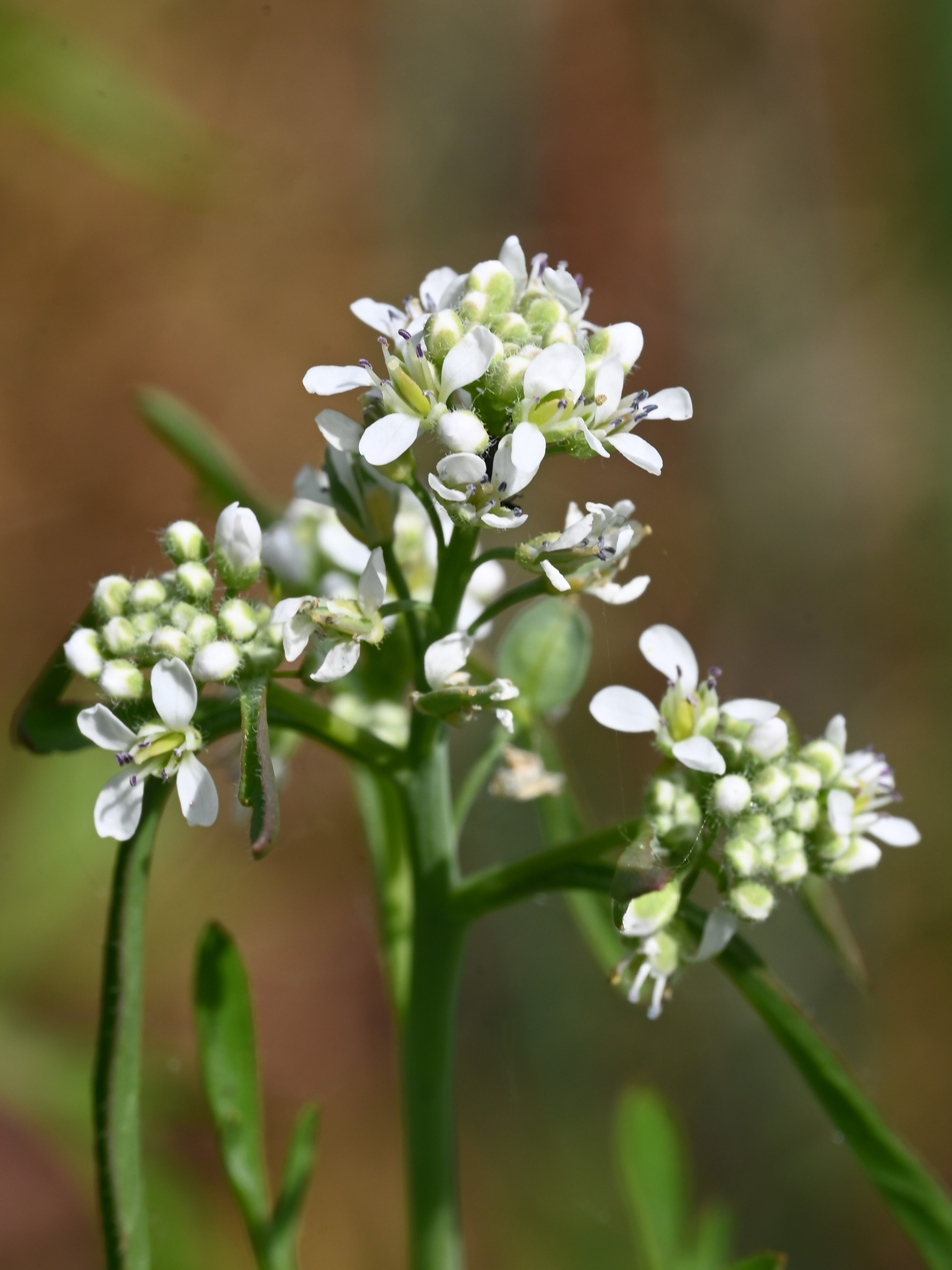

Scientific classification
- Kingdom: Plantae
- Clade: Tracheophytes
- Clade: Angiosperms
- Clade: Eudicots
- Clade: Rosids
- Order: Brassicales
- Family: Brassicaceae
- Genus: Lepidium
- Species: L. draba

Binomial name
- Lepidium draba L.

Subspecies
- Lepidium draba subsp. draba (= Cardaria draba); Lepidium draba subsp. chalepense (L.) P.Fourn. (=Cardaria chalepensis)

Synonyms
- Cardaria draba (L.) Desv.

= Lepidium draba =

Whitetop

Species of flowering plant

Lepidium draba, commonly known as hoary cress, whitetop, whiteweed, or peppergrass, is a perennial plant species in the mustard family, Brassicaceae. It is native to Eurasia, specifically regions of Europe and western to central Asia, but has become widely distributed across the globe, including most of the United States, as well as in Canada and parts of Mexico.

== Description ==
Whitetop is a perennial herb that reproduces by seeds and by horizontal creeping roots. The stem is stoutish, erect or spreading, 10 to 80 centimetres (4 to 31 1/2 inches) tall, branched, covered sparsely with grayish, soft hairs. The leaves are alternate, simple, and mostly toothed. The basal leaves measure 4–10 centimetres (1 1/2–4 inches) in length, have short petioles, and are lanceolate to ovate in shape. The upper stem leaves are sessile, 2–6.5 cm (3/4–2 1/2 in) long, and oblong to tapering, with broad bases that clasp the stem.

=== Flowering ===
Flowering usually occurs in the spring to early summer. The plant produces slightly domed, corymb-like clusters of white flowers, in which the individual flower stalks grow upward from various points off the branch to approximately the same height. Each flower typically has four white petals measuring 3–5 millimetres (1/8–1/4 in) in length, approximately twice as long as the sepals. After flowering, the plant forms heart-shaped seed pods called silicles, each containing two seeds.

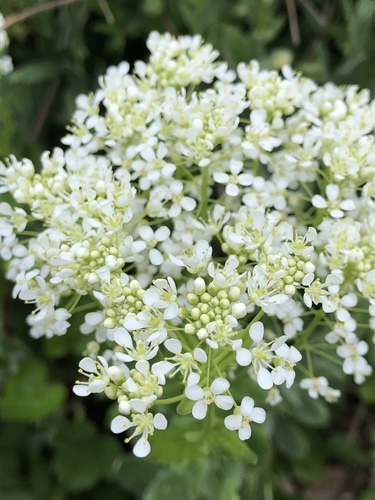
The four-petaled flowers

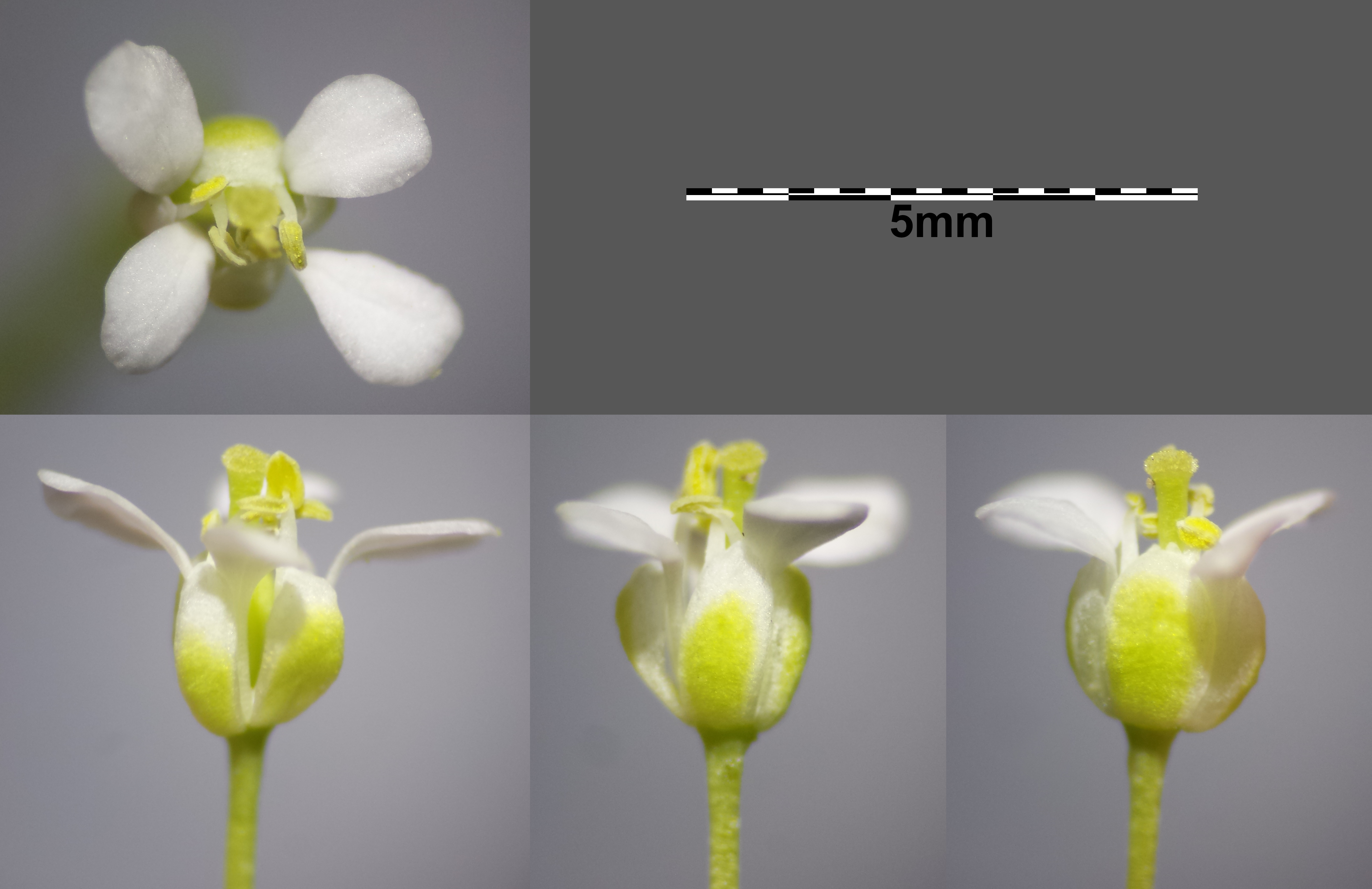
Flower with 5 mm scale

=== Reproduction ===
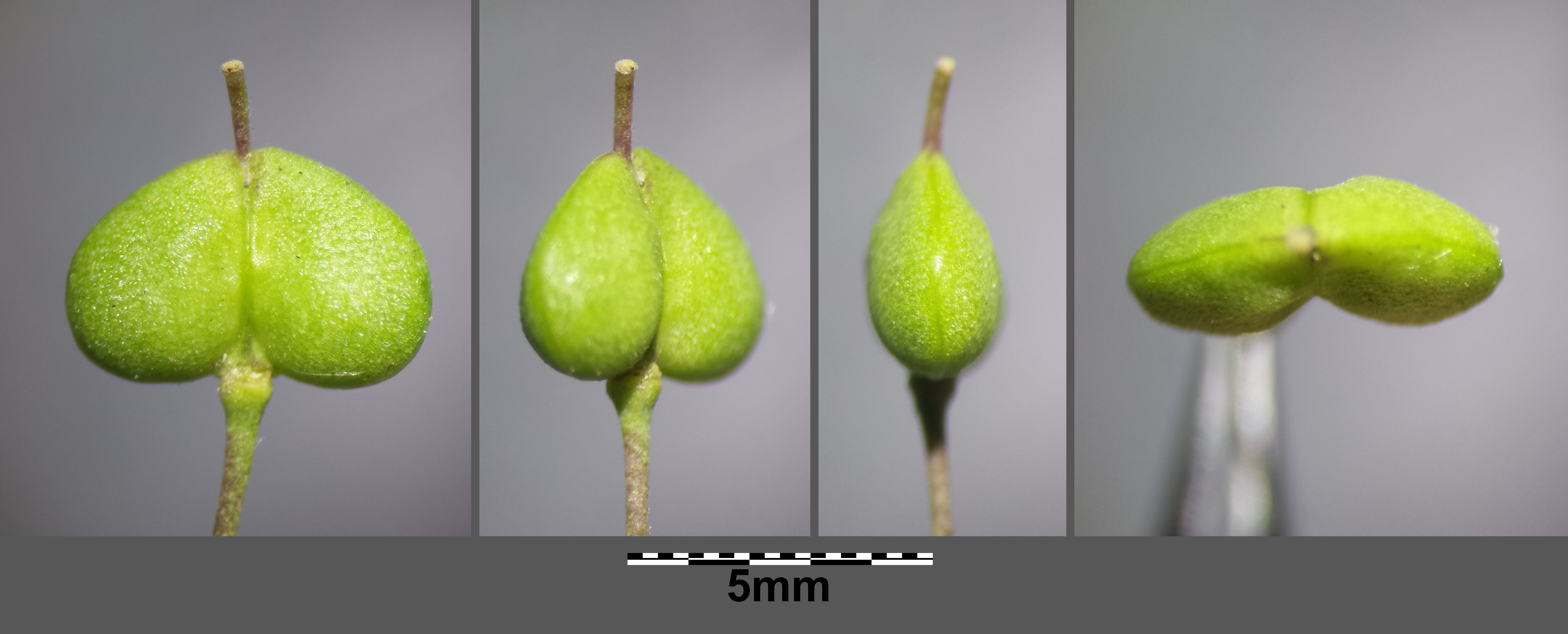
Seed pod with 5 mm scale

Lepidium draba reproduces through both clonal (vegetative) and sexual (seed-based) methods, with clonal reproduction being the dominant method. The plant spreads via lateral rhizomes, allowing it to expand rapidly and form dense, interconnected patches. Individual plants can produce hundreds of new shoots each year, contributing to the formation of large, long-lived colonies. This clonal growth allows the plant to persist even under abnormal conditions, as it can regenerate easily from root fragments, especially after disturbance.

In addition, L. draba produces seeds in large quantities through sexual reproduction. A single shoot can produce hundreds of seed pods, each containing two seeds. These seeds can remain viable in the soil for several years and germinate in the spring and fall. While seed production plays a smaller role in local population expansion, it is important for long-distance dispersal and the establishment of new populations. As a result, these reproductive methods make L. draba highly resilient and difficult to control.

== Distribution and habitat ==
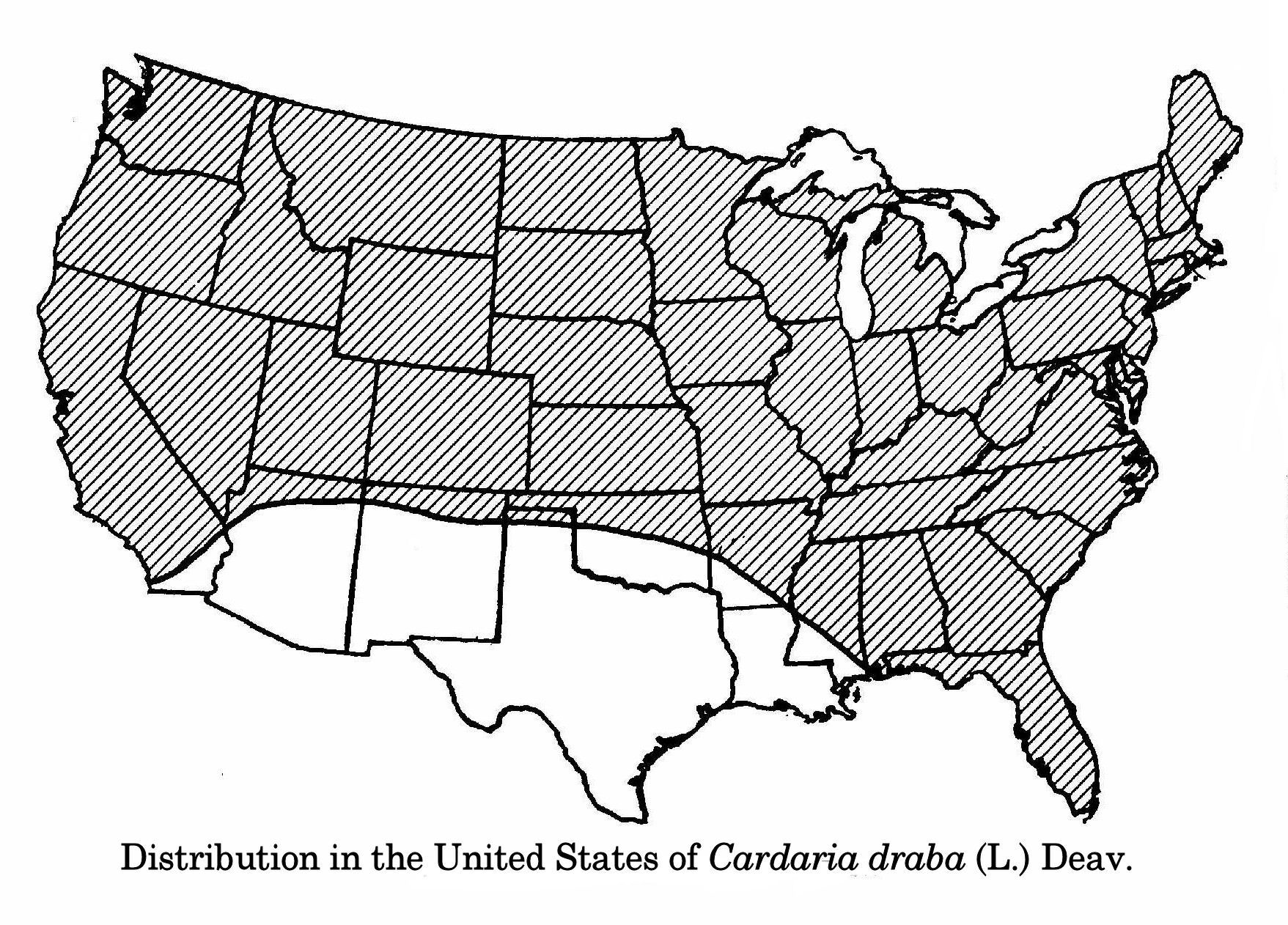
United States distribution map

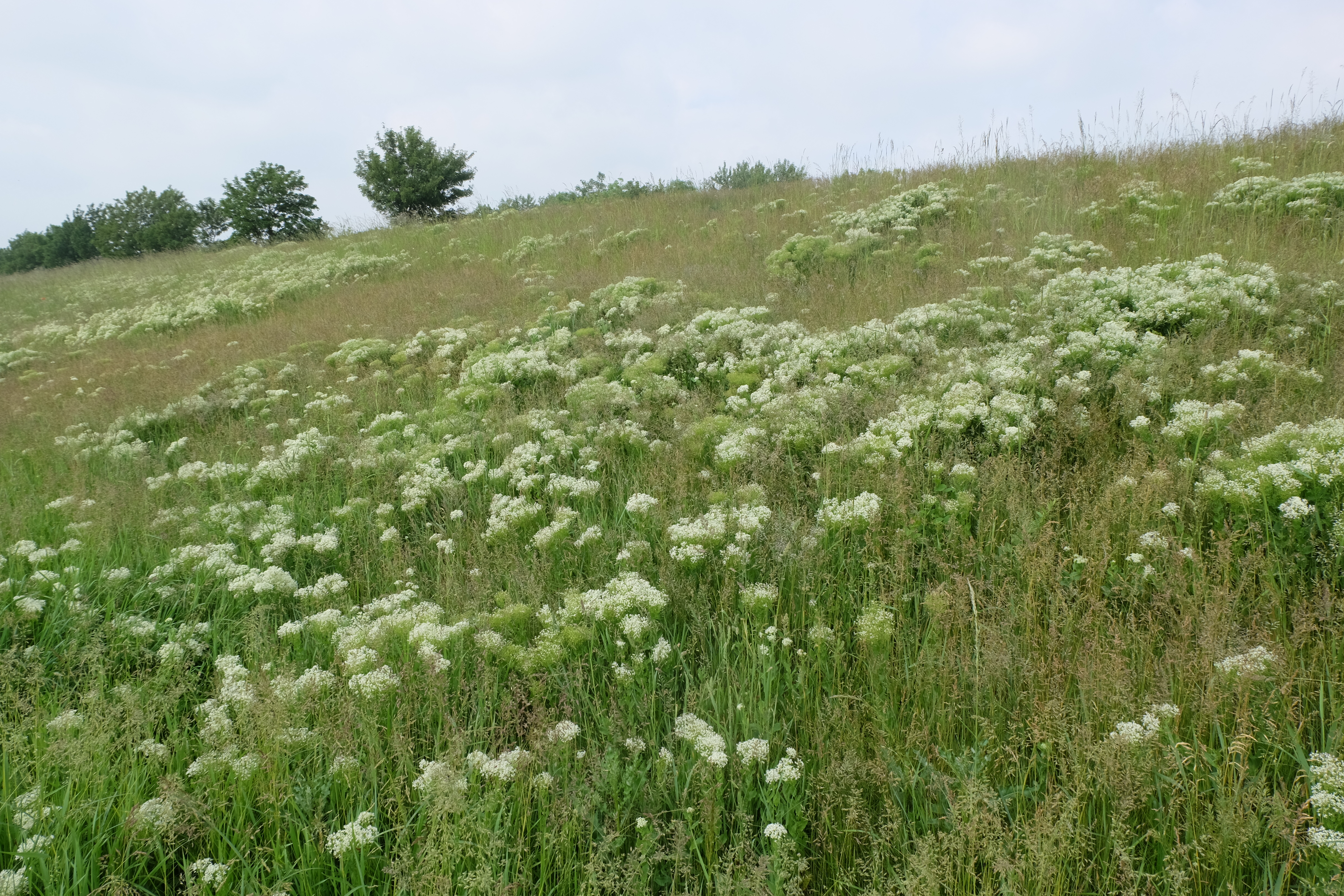
Blooming in a field

Lepidium draba is native to Eurasia, specifically regions of Europe and western to central Asia, but has become widely distributed across the globe. In North America, it is now found throughout most of the United States, particularly in the central and western regions, as well as in Canada and parts of Mexico. It has been suggested that native Poa grasses may be able to outcompete whitetop in North America.

The species was first recorded in the US around 1862, believed to have been unintentionally introduced through contaminated agricultural seed or ship ballast.

== Ecology ==
Lepidium draba is a highly competitive, disturbance‑adapted perennial whose success is driven by vigorous clonal growth, deep root reserves, and potent chemical defenses that suppress neighboring vegetation. Its ability to rapidly colonize disturbed soils allows it to dominate plant communities and outcompete both native and agricultural species. Genetic analyses from both native Eurasian populations and introduced North American populations reveal unexpectedly high genetic diversity, indicating that the species experienced multiple introduction events rather than a single founder effect or genetic bottleneck. This broad genetic base likely enhances its ecological flexibility and contributes to its strong competitiveness.

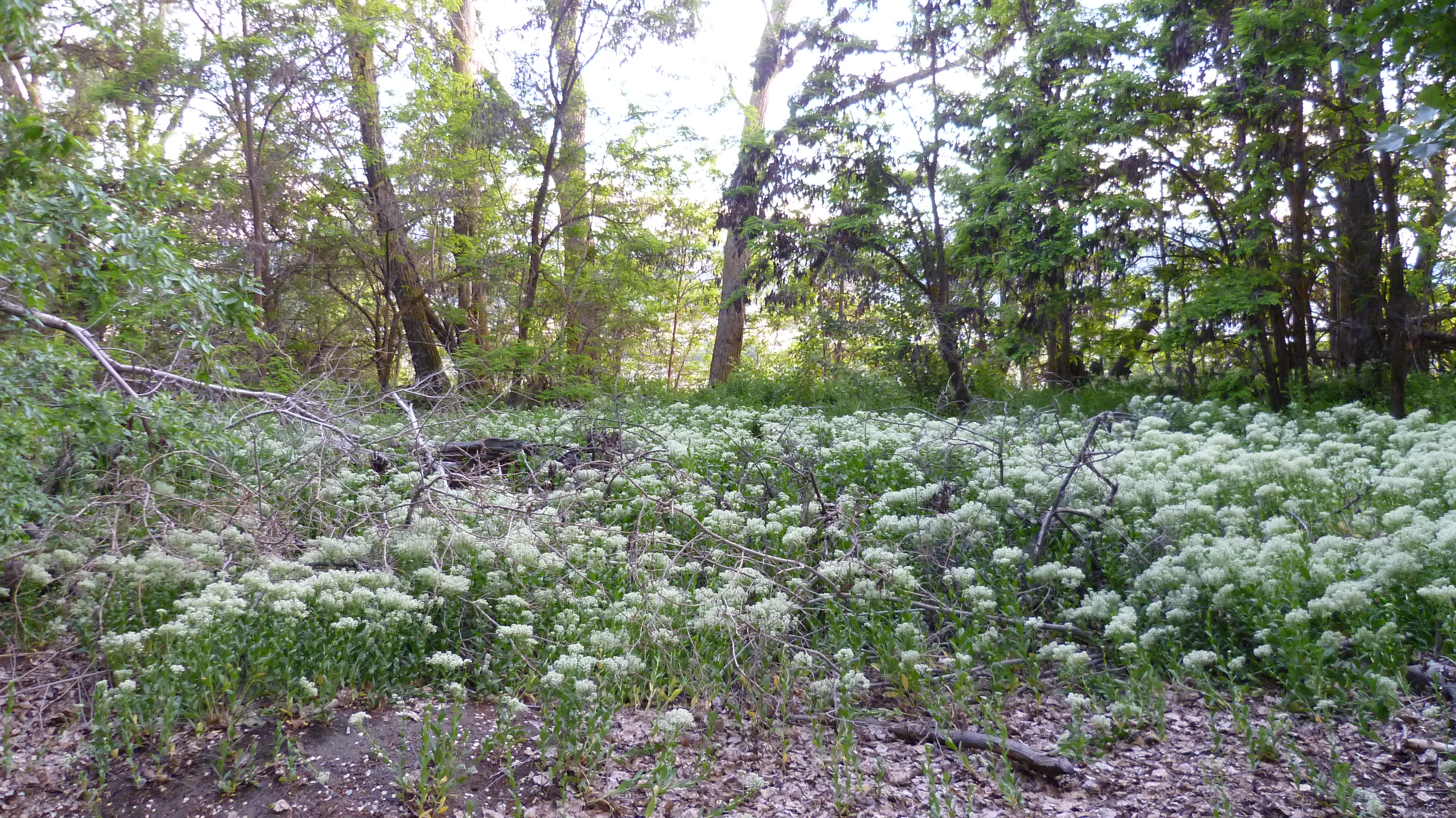
L. draba forming a dense monoculture in a disturbed field

Generally, the plant thrives in disturbed, nutrient‑rich, and open habitats such as agricultural fields, roadsides, and abandoned lands, where reduced competition enables rapid establishment and spread. Its high seed production and efficient dispersal mechanisms allow it to colonize new sites quickly, reinforcing its invasive expansion across landscapes. In competitive settings, L. draba exerts strong dominance over native grasses and forbs, significantly reducing their biomass and recruitment when grown together. European plant species tend to show greater tolerance to the chemical and physical interference exerted by L. draba, suggesting that coevolution in its native range moderates its competitive impact. Overall, the species’ ecological success is driven by its ability to exploit disturbance, suppress neighbors, and rapidly occupy available space. Research indicates that its seeds have strong drought tolerance and chemical dormancy, helping the plant spread in dry environments.

In reference to its primary characteristics, its ability to spread aggressively through underground rhizomes allows it to dominate disturbed and semi-natural habitats where competition is reduced. This vegetative growth strategy allows the plant to rapidly occupy space and suppress neighboring vegetation, contributing to its ecological success. Interestingly, comparative studies show no significant difference in competitive ability between invasive North American populations and native European populations, suggesting that its dominance is not solely a product of novel environmental conditions but rather an inherent trait of the species across its range.

=== Invasiveness ===
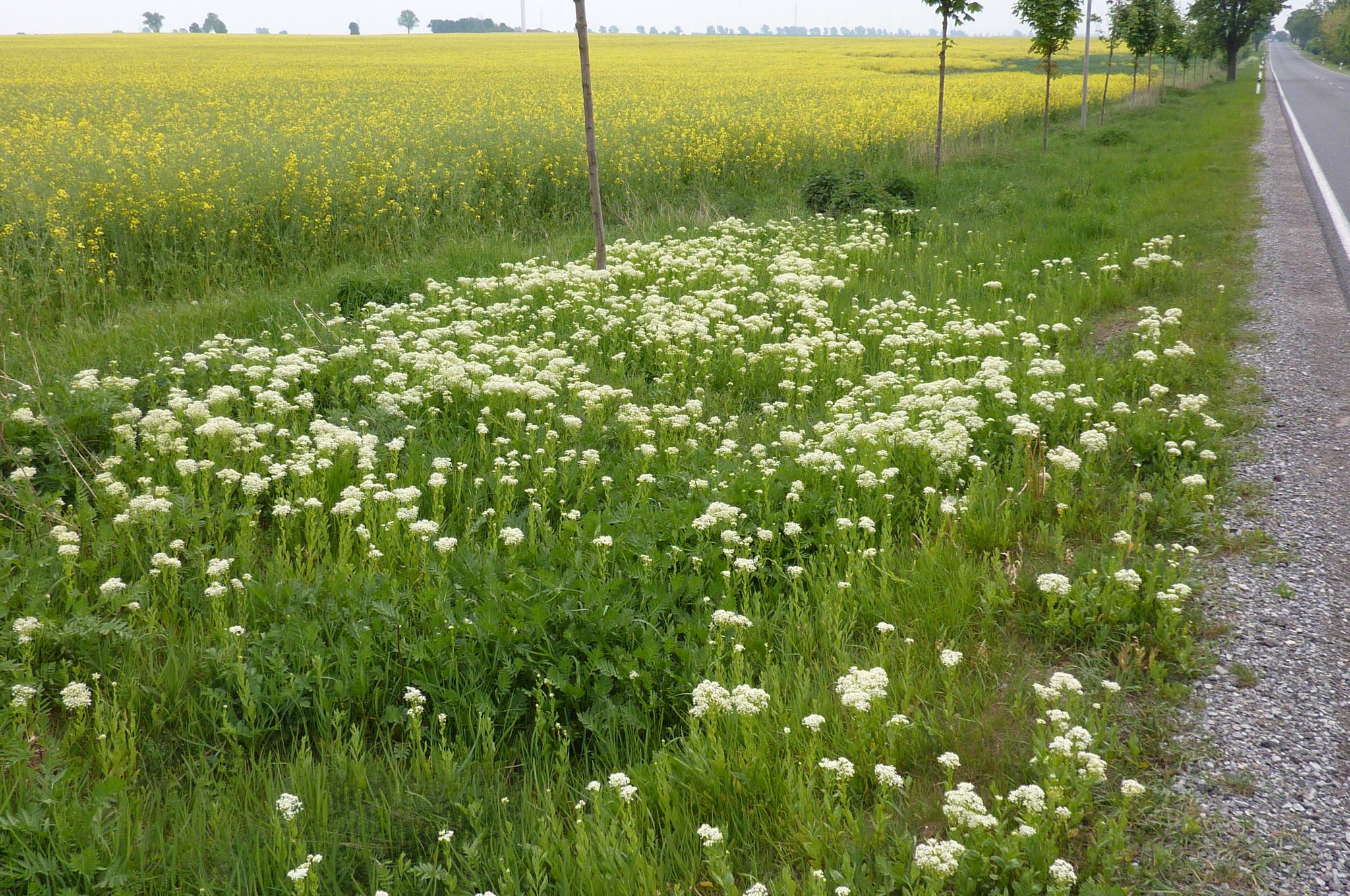
Monocultures of L. draba on a roadside

Today, L. draba is recognized as a noxious weed and as an invasive species in many areas due to its ability to thrive in disturbed areas such as agricultural fields, roadsides, and rangelands, where it spreads rapidly and dominates native plant species. Its invasiveness is also due to its extensive rhizomatous root system, which allows the plant to spread rapidly through clonal expansion and form dense, persistent patches and expand several meters per year without relying on seed production. Additionally, the plant can regenerate from small root fragments and is highly resistant to mechanical and chemical control methods.

Although clonal reproduction is dominant, human activities have played a significant role in its spread, particularly through the movement of contaminated agricultural seeds such as alfalfa. Once established, the plant continues to spread unintentionally through agricultural practices and in disturbed environments, including agricultural systems and riparian zones, where it outcompetes native plants. Its high environmental tolerance further supports its persistence and success as an invasive species across a wide range of conditions.

In addition, the plant may show allelopathic effects by releasing chemical compounds that prevent the growth of surrounding plant species and reduce competition. Its persistence, rapid spread, and adaptability allow it to outcompete those that are native to the environment and dominate invaded ecosystems, making it a significant ecological concern.

The ecological impacts L. draba has in the regions it invades are significant. It reduces biodiversity by outcompeting native plant species, which leads to simplified plant communities and disrupted ecosystems. This can affect organisms that depend on those plants for food and habitat. Additionally, it negatively impacts agricultural systems. It can reduce crop yields and forage quality in pastures, making it problematic for farmers and land managers. The plant also serves as a host for various agricultural pests, specifically for those that affect crops within the Brassicaceae, which can potentially increase pest pressure in nearby cultivated fields.

==== Control ====
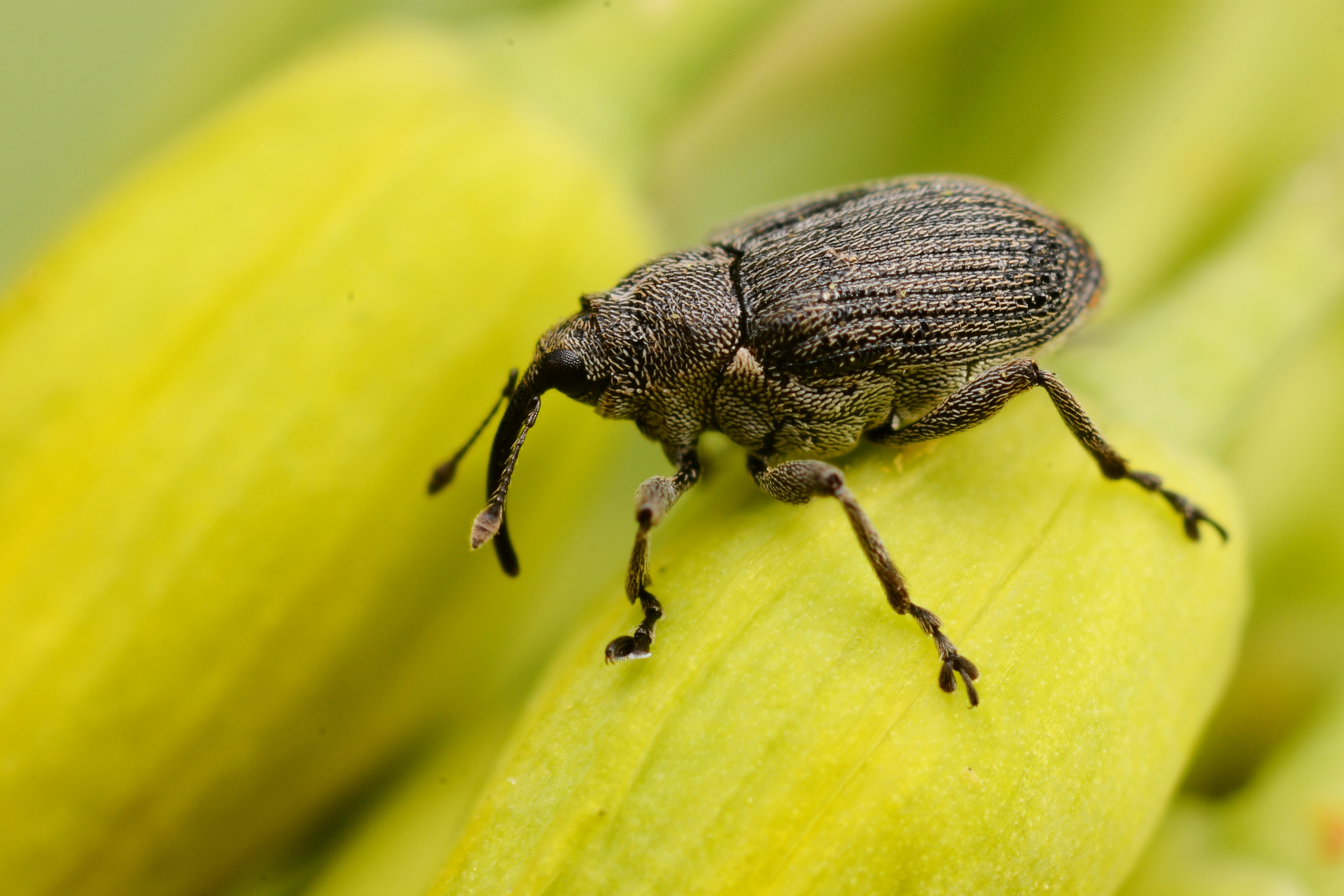
The cabbage weevil (Ceutorhynchus assimilis) is a potential biological agent against L. draba.

Lepidium draba presents significant challenges for control and eradication due to its clonal growth and regenerative capacity. Its underground rhizomes make physical removal difficult, and even small root fragments can regenerate into new plants, allowing populations to persist and reestablish after disturbance. The species is notably resistant to herbicides, grazing, and manual removal, further complicating management efforts. To prevent its spread, it is essential to clean equipment, vehicles, and personal gear after working in infested areas to avoid unintentionally transporting plant material. Long-term suppression strategies include the use of host-specific biological control agents, such as root-feeding and stem-mining weevils, which gradually weaken the plant. Additionally, systemic herbicides applied in early spring or fall can reduce root reserves, though repeated treatments over multiple years are necessary for a meaningful impact.

== Toxicity ==
L. draba contains chemical compounds known as glucosinolates, which can be toxic to livestock if consumed in large quantities.

== Potential uses ==
L. draba has been researched for its medicinal potential. Researchers have reported that L. draba extracts can protect the liver, kidneys, and intestines.

In biotechnology, researchers have improved the stability and efficiency of L. draba peroxidase enzymes by attaching them to magnetic nanoparticles.
