= Project 8 (physics experiment) =

Experiment measuring neutrino mass

Project 8 Physics Experiment And Collaboration
- Active years: 2009 – present

Phases
- Phase I: Completed
- Phase II: Completed
- Phase III: In progress
- Phase IV: Planned

Sponsors
- U.S. Department of Energy (Office of Science, Office of Nuclear Physics), National Science Foundation, University of Mainz PRISMA+ Cluster of Excellence

Involved countries
- United States, Germany, Belgium, United Kingdom

Involved institutes
- Yale University, University of Washington, University of Texas at Arlington, University of Pittsburgh, Pennsylvania State University, Pacific Northwest National Laboratory, Massachusetts Institute of Technology, Lawrence Livermore National Laboratory, Lawrence Berkeley National Laboratory, Karlsruhe Institute of Technology, Johannes Gutenberg University Mainz, Indiana University, University of Illinois Urbana-Champaign, Case Western Reserve University, Carnegie Mellon University, Ghent University, Colorado School of Mines, University of Manchester

The Project 8 experiment is an ongoing neutrino mass physics experiment. Project 8 also refers to the international collaboration carrying out the experiment.

In 2009, Benjamin Monreal and Joseph A. Formaggio proposed that single electrons moving in a magnetic field could be detected via their emission of cyclotron radiation. The frequency of this radiation depends on the relativistic mass of the electron, the sum of the rest mass and the kinetic energy divided by $c^2$. This approach would therefore allow a frequency-based determination of an electron's kinetic energy, a new method in spectroscopy called Cyclotron Radiation Emission Spectroscopy (CRES). The Project 8 collaboration formed to test this concept experimentally and achieved success in an experiment at the University of Washington in 2015.

The main motivation for this initiative was the measurement of the neutrino masses, specifically the absolute rest mass of the electron antineutrino using Cyclotron Radiation Emission Spectroscopy (CRES). Electrons emitted in beta decay are accompanied by neutrinos (strictly, antineutrinos, which still remain an open question whether or not they are the same as neutrinos). The neutrino emitted, a flavor state called the electron neutrino, is a linear superposition of three particles with tiny, slightly different, masses. The differences between the squares of those masses are known from neutrino oscillation experiments, but the absolute mass values are not yet known. The effective mass of the linear superposition is, for convenience, termed the mass of the electron neutrino.

The most sensitive experiments so far all use the beta decay of tritium and search for a modification of the continuous beta spectrum near the endpoint (maximum electron energy). Neutrino rest mass reduces the maximum electron kinetic energy, causing a change in the shape of the spectrum compared to the case with massless neutrinos. The KATRIN experiment has achieved the most sensitive upper limit on the mass to date, $0.45\,\text{eV}/c^2$.

Project 8 intends to use CRES for a sensitive measurement, ultimately in Phase IV to a limit of $0.04\,\text{eV}/c^2$, if not a mass determination. Neutrino oscillations do not determine the mass but do set a lower limit on the mass of $0.0085\,\text{eV}/c^2$ or $0.048\,\text{eV}/c^2$, depending on the unknown ordering of the 3 masses.

The collaboration has reported peer-reviewed experimental results in Phases I and II and is currently pursuing Phase III research and development. A future Phase IV is planned with the goal of improving sensitivity to $\lesssim 40$ meV.

== Scientific motivation ==
Neutrino oscillation experiments have established that neutrinos have non-zero mass, providing clear evidence for physics beyond the original formulation of the Standard Model. However, oscillation measurements are sensitive only to mass-squared differences and do not determine the absolute neutrino mass scale. On the other hand, cosmological measurements of the absolute neutrino mass are constrained by model-dependent parameters. Direct kinematic measurements of the beta-decay spectrum therefore provide a unique, model-independent laboratory approach to determining absolute neutrino rest mass.

Oscillation data imply lower bounds on the effective electron-neutrino mass measurable in beta decay of $m_\beta \gtrsim 0.0085$ eV for the normal mass ordering and $m_\beta \gtrsim 0.048$ eV for the inverted mass ordering.

These bounds motivate the sensitivity goal of Project 8, which targets a sensitivity of $0.04$ eV, right below the inverted-ordering lower bound. If an effective neutrino mass is not measured above Project 8's experimental limit, the result would strongly disfavor the inverted ordering.

Achieving a $0.04$ eV sensitivity is experimentally challenging. The current leading experiment, KATRIN, uses a large electrostatic spectrometer to study tritium beta decay and has reported an upper limit on the effective electron-neutrino mass of $m_\beta < 0.45$ eV (90% confidence level). Further sensitivity improvements using this technique would require spectrometers of significantly larger scale, which has motivated alternative approaches.

Project 8 uses an alternative approach based on frequency-domain spectroscopy to improve the sensitivity to the tritium beta-decay endpoint spectrum. Precision is achieved through frequency measurement, statistical scalability through operation as a differential spectrometer in extended source volumes, and long-term control of systematic effects by transitioning from molecular to atomic tritium.

=== Contribution to searches for sterile neutrinos ===
In addition to its primary goal of measuring the absolute neutrino mass scale, Project 8 is sensitive to hypothetical sterile neutrinos that mix with the active neutrinos. Such states would modify the tritium beta-decay spectrum by producing small distortions or kinks at energies below the endpoint, corresponding to the sterile-neutrino mass, as cyclotron radiation emission spectroscopy provides differential access to the beta spectrum over a broad energy range.

== Cyclotron radiation emission spectroscopy (CRES) ==
Project 8 measures the energy of electrons emitted in beta decay by detecting the cyclotron radiation produced as the electrons spiral in a magnetic field. The cyclotron frequency depends on the magnetic field strength and the electron's relativistic energy, allowing the kinetic energy to be inferred from a frequency measurement. Relevant background concepts include the charged-particle gyroradius and the classical Larmor formula.

In CRES, the emitted microwave radiation is detected and analyzed in the time–frequency domain. Individual electrons appear as characteristic frequency-increasing tracks ("chirps") due to gradual energy loss from radiation emission.

== Phase I: CRES Demonstrator ==
The goal of Phase I was to demonstrate cyclotron radiation emission spectroscopy (CRES) at the single-electron level and establish it as a viable technique for electron energy spectroscopy. Monoenergetic conversion electrons from $\ce{^{83m}Kr}$ decay were used as a well-defined test source, producing electron lines near 17.8 keV and 30 keV. Electrons were confined in a uniform magnetic field of approximately 1 T produced by a superconducting solenoid, causing them to emit cyclotron radiation in the microwave K band. This radiation was detected using a WR42 rectangular waveguide, which guided the signal—primarily coupled to its fundamental $TE_{10}$ mode—to low-noise receiver electronics. Magnetic trapping was employed to increase the observation time of individual electrons, allowing their cyclotron frequency to be tracked as it slowly increased due to radiative energy loss. Phase I achieved the first direct observation of cyclotron radiation from a single electron and demonstrated frequency-based reconstruction of electron kinetic energy, validating CRES as a new spectroscopic method for future neutrino-mass experiments.

== Phase II: Molecular tritium beta spectroscopy and first CRES neutrino-mass limit ==
In Phase II, Project 8 extended the CRES technique to the continuous beta spectrum of molecular tritium, producing the first frequency-domain measurement of a tritium endpoint spectrum and the first direct neutrino-mass limit obtained using cyclotron radiation spectroscopy.

Phase II employed a cryogenic gaseous CRES cell operating at 85 K, positioned inside a superconducting solenoid providing an axial magnetic field of approximately 0.96 T. Beta-decay electrons from molecular tritium ($T_2$) were magnetically trapped in near-harmonic axial potentials formed by auxiliary coils and detected via their cyclotron radiation near 26 GHz, which was coupled to the $TE_{11}$ mode of a circular waveguide with a 10.03 mm inner diameter and 132 mm length. Tritium gas was injected into the cell at a stabilized partial pressure of $10^{-6}$ mbar, chosen to balance event rate against electron–gas scattering. Cyclotron radiation was amplified by cryogenic low-noise amplifiers at 30 K and processed in real time to form time–frequency spectrograms.

Individual electron signals appeared as positively chirped tracks in frequency due to radiative energy loss. The electron kinetic energy at decay was inferred from the initial cyclotron frequency of the first detected track in each event. A shallow trap ($\approx 0.08$ mT depth) optimized for energy resolution, and a deep trap ($\approx 1.4$ mT depth) optimized for acceptance and statistics. The deep-trap configuration was used for tritium data taking, while $\ce{^{83m}Kr}$ conversion electrons at 17.8 keV provided in-situ calibration of the detector response, magnetic field, scattering effects, and detection efficiency across the relevant frequency range.

Using $\ce{^{83m}Kr}$ data in the shallow trap, Phase II achieved an instrumental energy resolution of 1.66 $\pm$ 0.19 eV (FWHM), after subtracting the intrinsic natural linewidth of the krypton conversion line. In the deep trap, the broader acceptance increased the event rate by a factor of ~40 at the cost of reduced resolution ( $\approx$54 eV FWHM) and a higher probability of initial undetected scattering. The detection efficiency, including frequency and energy-dependent effects, was measured using controlled magnetic-field shifts. The dominant background was radio-frequency noise, which was characterized sufficiently to enable a background-free tritium measurement over the analysis window.

Data were collected over 82 live days using three simultaneous frequency windows spanning the electron kinetic-energy range of 16.2–19.8 keV. In total, 3770 distinct tritium beta-decay events were recorded. The measured spectrum was modeled as the theoretical molecular-tritium beta spectrum convolved with the molecular final-state distribution and the experimentally determined detector response.

From the endpoint region, Phase II of Project 8 obtained the first direct neutrino mass limit based on cyclotron-frequency spectroscopy, finding:

1. mβ < 155 eV/c² (90 % Bayesian credible interval)
2. mβ < 152 eV/c² (90 % frequentist confidence level)

In summary, Phase II established CRES as a viable, low-background, frequency-based technique for precision beta spectroscopy and demonstrated all essential components required for future larger-volume and cavity-based CRES detectors for subsequent Project 8 phases.

While the Phase II neutrino-mass limit is not competitive with KATRIN's current limit, it demonstrated the technique on tritium with low backgrounds and provided an experimental validation of key detector-response and efficiency modeling needed for future scaling.

== Phase III: Cavity-based CRES and scaling R&D ==
Phase III combines cavity-based detection with scaling studies required for larger source volumes. In this phase, beta-decay electrons excite standing-wave microwave modes in resonant cavities rather than coupling to open waveguides. Operation at lower magnetic fields and correspondingly lower cyclotron frequencies enables substantially larger detection volumes while preserving frequency-based energy resolution.

Mode-filtered cavity designs are used to control electromagnetic mode structure and mitigate mode crowding as detector volumes increase. Phase III focuses on demonstrating the feasibility of cavity-based CRES in an effort to scale the experiment to the required sensitivity.

=== Research and development toward atomic tritium ===
In future phases, Project 8 intends to use atomic tritium as the beta-decay source. Atomic tritium eliminates rotational and vibrational excitation present in molecular tritium, reducing spectral broadening near the beta-decay endpoint and improving systematic control.

Research toward atomic tritium includes methods for producing, cooling, and confining atoms in magnetic traps, exploiting the electron magnetic moment. Both scalable spectroscopy and atomic tritium sources are necessary components of beta-decay direct neutrino-mass experiments beyond KATRIN at the sensitivity scale of Project 8.
