= Kreß =

Kreß is a German language surname. Notable people with the name include:

- Anton Kreß (1899–1957), German footballer
- Dorothea Kreß (1924–2018), German shot putter
- Hermann Kreß (1895–1943), German general
- Willibald Kreß (1906–1989), German footballer
- Members of the patrician family Kreß von Kressenstein:
  - Franz Kreß von Kressenstein (1881–1957), German general
  - Friedrich Freiherr Kress von Kressenstein (1870–1948), German military officer
  - Georg Ludwig von Kreß (1797–1877), Bavarian artist
  - Gustav Kreß von Kressenstein (1838–1898), Bavarian artist
  - Otto Kreß von Kressenstein (1850–1929), German general

== See also ==
- Kress (disambiguation)
