= Ricardo Campello =

Venezuelan Windsurfer

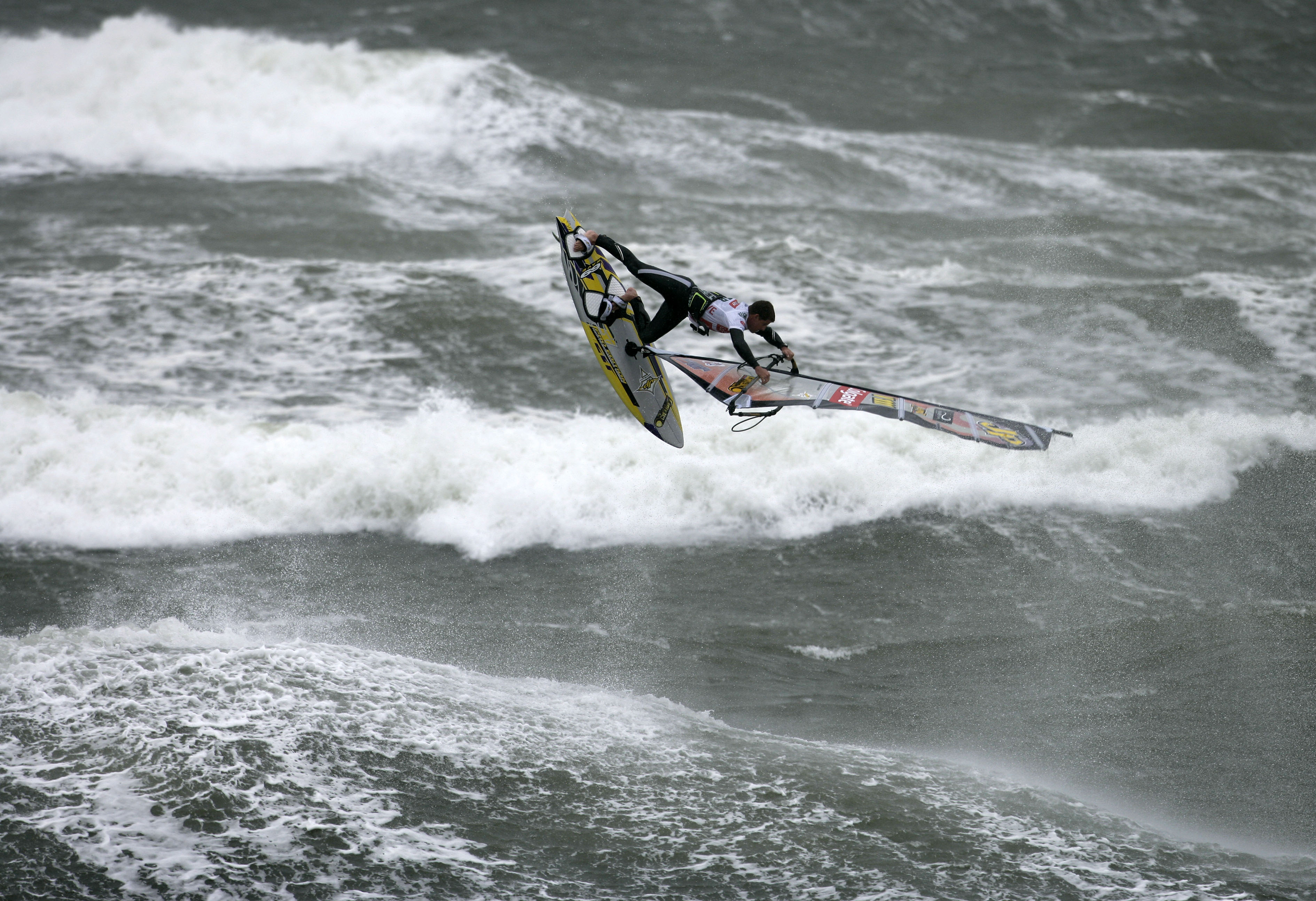
Ricardo Campello competing at Windsurf World Cup Sylt

Ricardo Campello (born July 16, 1985) is a Brazilian-born professional windsurfer. He began windsurfing after moving to Venezuela, quickly progressing to become three-time world freestyle champion in 2003, 2004 and 2005.
