= Kres =

Kres may refer to:

- KRES, a radio station
- Feliks W. Kres, Polish fantasy writer
- Kres, California
