= Kress, Virginia =

Unincorporated community in Virginia, United States

Coordinates: 36°55′50″N 77°48′37″W

Kress is an unincorporated community located in Brunswick County, in the U.S. state of Virginia.
