= Bittercress =

Bittercress or Bitter-cress may refer to:

- Barbarea vulgaris
- Any plant in the genus Cardamine, especially Cardamine bulbosa or Cardamine hirsuta
