= Yellowcress =

Yellowcress is a common name for several plants:

- Nasturtium, a genus in the family Brassicaceae
- Rorippa, a genus in the family Brassicaceae
  - Rorippa palustris
