= Magnetic nanoparticles in drug delivery =

Various aspects about the use of magnetic nanoparticle use in drug delivery

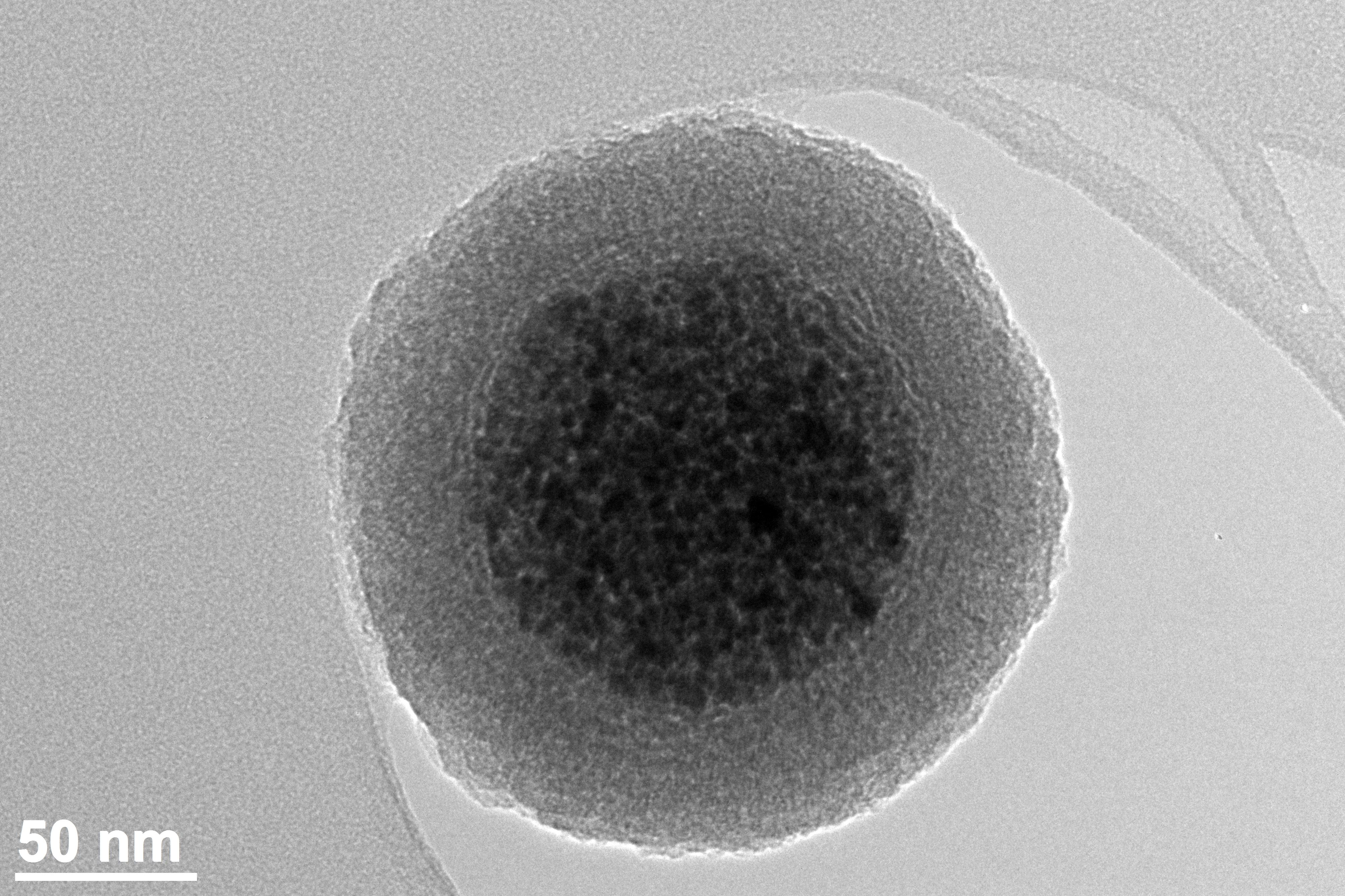
Composition of a magnetic nanoparticle

Magnetic nanoparticle drug delivery is the use of external or internal magnets to increase the accumulation of therapeutic elements contained in nanoparticles to fight pathologies in specific parts of the body. It has been applied in cancer treatments, cardiovascular diseases, and diabetes. Scientific researches revealed that magnetic drug delivery can be made increasingly useful in clinical settings.

== Background ==
The development of magnetic nanoparticle drug delivery started with Paul Ehrlich's concept of a "magic bullet". The concept was built during the 1970s with the application of the anticancer drug doxorubicin in animal models. The first successful clinical trial of the process occurred in 1996.

The use of magnetic nanoparticles for drug delivery results in the accumulation of therapeutic elements at a disease site to increase their therapeutic effects as well as limit side-effects at non-target loci. There are many factors that act as variables to accumulation including blood circulation, adherence of therapeutic elements, diffusion of therapeutic elements, bodily response to increased concentrations of these particles, etc. Tumor hypoxia is one of the largest challenges regarding cancer drug delivery as tumors grow faster than vasculature, making initial targeting increasingly important in treatment. This tumor environment drives considerable attention towards magnetic nanoparticles as treatment modalities allowing faster and efficient delivery of drugs and treatment.

Fundamentally, pulsatile artificial capillaries made to mimic blood flow show that the flow force of the capillaries inhibits accumulation of nanoparticles on a magnet downstream, but the magnetic force of the upstream magnet overcomes the force of flow to result in larger accumulation. As a result, for near-surface disease states, magnets should be placed downstream of the disease locus, and for intra-surface disease states, magnets should be placed upstream of the disease locus to maximize accumulation.

== Properties ==
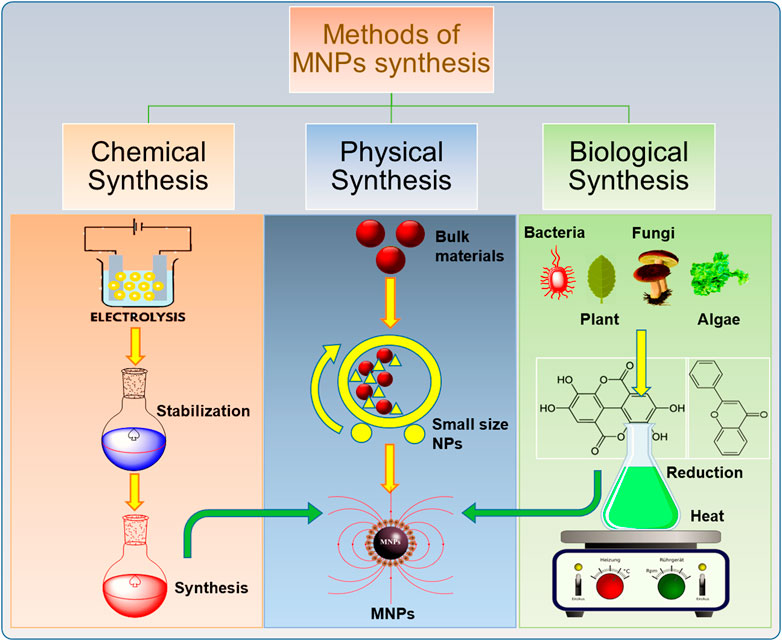
Synthesis of magnetic nanoparticles

Magnetic nanoparticles for therapeutic applications are selected based on their properties determined by the nanoparticle composition which can be divided into three main groups - metal only, metal alloy, or metal oxide nanoparticles. Some key properties of magnetic nanoparticles include a large specific surface area, desirable biocompatibility, presence without causing disease or eliciting immune response, and superparamagnetism. Magnetic nanoparticles are influenced by an external magnetic field due to the magnetic moment found within the network unit. The external magnetic field is necessary for transport and activation of these nanoparticles. Therefore, when a drug is attached/encased in magnetic nanoparticles, these particles will be targeted using an external magnetic field to guide and concentrate the drug at desired disease locus.

Design of magnetic nanoparticles for clinical application requires careful evaluation of the effects of surface modification, size, and shape on its magnetic properties. Ferromagnetic properties of nanoparticles have been used in magnetic drug delivery systems. This is important, as ferromagnetism is described as the coercivity of particles to form macro-materials on permanent magnets. The macro-materials include iron, cobalt, and nickel; these elements retain their magnetic properties when a magnet is removed, which is why they accumulate on the permanent magnets. Iron oxides, such as Fe_{2}O_{4} and Fe_{3}O_{4} in particular, play a key role in magnetic nanoparticle drug delivery. The particle sizes typically range from 3 nm to 30 nm. Overall, these iron oxides display good magnetic properties, lower toxicity, and high stability against degradation.

For example, a Fe3-δO4 core-shell is used as a carrier for drug delivery. The designed magnetic nanoparticle-based structure displayed biocompatibility, the formation of a covalent bond between the carrier and drug, and glutathione-responsive drug release which prevents early drug release and increases bioavailability. Furthermore, the presence of magnetic nanoparticles in this drug delivery method allows for its response to external magnetic fields for functionalization. The combination of superparamagnetic iron oxide (SPIO) and polyethylene glycol (PEG) used as drug carriers for doxorubicin are influenced by external magnetism. In vivo SPIO-PEG-D under a magnetic field leads to greater tumor accumulation of therapeutic elements, shows lower tumor size, and reduces cardiotoxicity and hepatotoxicity in the magnetic field. Doxorubicin is known for being extremely toxic, and SPIO-PEG shows potential for use as a nanoparticle carrier for reduced toxicity in the periphery.

== Magnetic nanoparticle coating ==
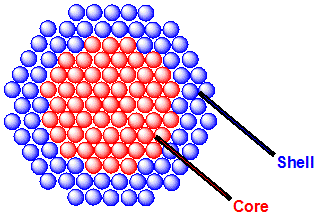
Core-shell structure

Coating defines the biocompatibility of the therapeutic agent and its ability to travel in the body. When the agent is not biocompatible, it will quickly be excreted from the body, and there will be magnetic accumulation or off-target therapeutic effects. The use of organic or inorganic coating molecules increases the half-life of the nanocarrier by delaying its clearance by the reticuloendothelial system (RES). This delay occurs because the coating overcomes the pH, hydrophobicity, and surface charge of the magnetic nanoparticles. Additionally, coating allows molecules to covalently bind to specific molecules, such as ligands, proteins, or antibodies, which provides binding specificity to target tissues.

A common structure of coating includes the core-shell structure. In this structure, metal oxide cores are coated with biocompatible materials which allows for increased control and biocompatibility. The most common coatings used for optimum response involve the use of polysaccharides like dextran and polymers like polyethylene glycol. Furthermore, carbon coatings have proved to be biocompatible and have high capacity for absorption into cells. Even polyaniline with anti-cancer agent epirubicin can be used for tumor exploration of the brain. Polyethyleneimine has displayed high cellular accumulation and low toxicity. This coating was found to have poor pharmacokinetic properties when used alone, but with magnetic field induction, it was found to accumulate on tumors at clinically significant rates. Silica coatings increase the external surface area to assist in binding and are heat resistant. There are various coatings used to prevent leaching of the magnetic core of the nanoparticles; these coatings have a significant salt concentration with a slightly alkaline (basic) pH.

Polyethylene glycol (PEG) is an example of a hydrophilic coating that has been used as a biocompatible targeting modality. Hydrophilic PEG interacts beneficially with the physiological environment to improve biocompatibility by preventing opsonization on the surface of the particles, thus increasing circulation time from minutes to hours, or even days, for magnetic nanoparticles. MRI shows prolonged PEG circulation and increased SPIO-PEG-D particle accumulation within the tumor with magnetic guidance.

Coating not only provides hydrophilic and hydrophobic properties but can also contribute to temperature- and pH-dependent properties. Particular substances, such as PNG, provide these two properties, allowing unique and efficient delivery of drugs. This also enables greater control of release, as body temperature allows a greater amount of drug released, while physiological pH allows a lower amount of drug released. Other coating options for similar pH-dependent properties include the hydrogel chitosan that is crosslinked to a polymer coating. These coating choices have displayed positive results in delivery of anticancer drugs.

== Impact ==
The small sizes of magnetic nanoparticles allow them to target a variety of targets of different sizes for different purposes. These sizes range from targeting a small cell (10-100 μm), a virus (20-45 nm), a protein (5-50 nm), or a gene (2 nm wide and 10-100 nm long). If these magnetic nanoparticles are coated correctly, they can interact with and enter body structures, allowing adequate delivery of a drug. Additionally, using magnetic nanoparticles in drug delivery has remote control capability. This occurs through the external magnetic field gradient that is associated with the magnetic field's permeability within human tissue. With the application of this remote control, accumulation and transfer of the magnetic nanoparticles is promoted, which has been especially useful in the delivery of anticancer drugs to specific tumor tissues.

Another advantage of drug delivery using magnetic nanoparticles is the personability of magnet placement depending on disease state location. While this may also be a limitation, it can be effective if the resources can be used for personally tailored medicine reception. Additionally, a major advantage of magnetic nanoparticles is that they can be visualized with ultrasound and/or MRI imaging. Increase in cellular uptake of SPIO-PEG-D was linked to distinguishable darker differences in MRI and increased tumor visibility.

== Limitations ==
Limitations of magnetic drug delivery can range from their inherent magnetic properties to interactions with bodily barriers. When magnetic nanoparticles are in the bloodstream, they have high solubility and ionic strength, allowing them to interact with plasma proteins, stimulating the immune system to further inhibit their function. Additionally, the proportion of the nanoparticle size to the target tissue has shown limitations in effective drug delivery, especially in the kidneys and the brain. Intracellular barriers include the removal of the magnetic nanoparticles from the target membrane by ligand-dependent endocytosis followed by separation via acidification in the endosome chamber. Other barriers to consider are the depth of the target tissue, vascular sources, body weight, the speed and amount of blood flow to the target tissue, distance from the field source, injection route, and tumor volume. However, the use of magnetic nanoparticles is more effective when used in near-surface tissues that have slower blood flow, allowing for diffusion and/or endocytosis of nanoparticles into the tissue.

Another limitation involves the accumulation of nanoparticles only 5 mm away from an external magnet. An accumulation distance of 5 mm may not be sufficient in larger applications of magnetic drug delivery. This may be effective enough for sites in closer proximity to the surface of the body, but when the site of interest is deeper within tissue, then the advantage of using magnetic nanoparticles for delivery decreases exponentially. It has been proposed to implant magnets within the body to overcome this limitation. Magnet location placement can be upstream or downstream of the location of the disease for maximum accumulation.

Another question arises from the subject of cellular uptake. While the use of a magnetic field may guide particles to therapeutic sites, it is not an indicator of cellular uptake of particles. This raises questions regarding the effect, if any, of the therapeutic element on the effector area. Generally, nanoparticles efficiently cross cell barriers; however, this can change in the presence of other processes. Promise has been shown with the use of PEG coating. Hydrophilic coatings have shown enhanced cellular uptake at tumor cells with the use of a magnetic field.

Another concern arises regarding the biotoxicity of magnetic nanoparticles. It is difficult to say for certain that all magnetic nanoparticles are toxic due the large variety of magnetic particles that can be used. The nanoparticles size, biodegradability, composition, and dosage are a few of the properties impacting this concern. However, it has been shown that magnetic nanoparticles that are either inhaled to enter the lungs or are swallowed and enter the gastrointestinal tract have unsatisfactory impacts on the body. PEG, linear neutral polyether coatings have a tendency to lose their targeting capabilities in response to their "immune stealthing" function.

== Applications ==
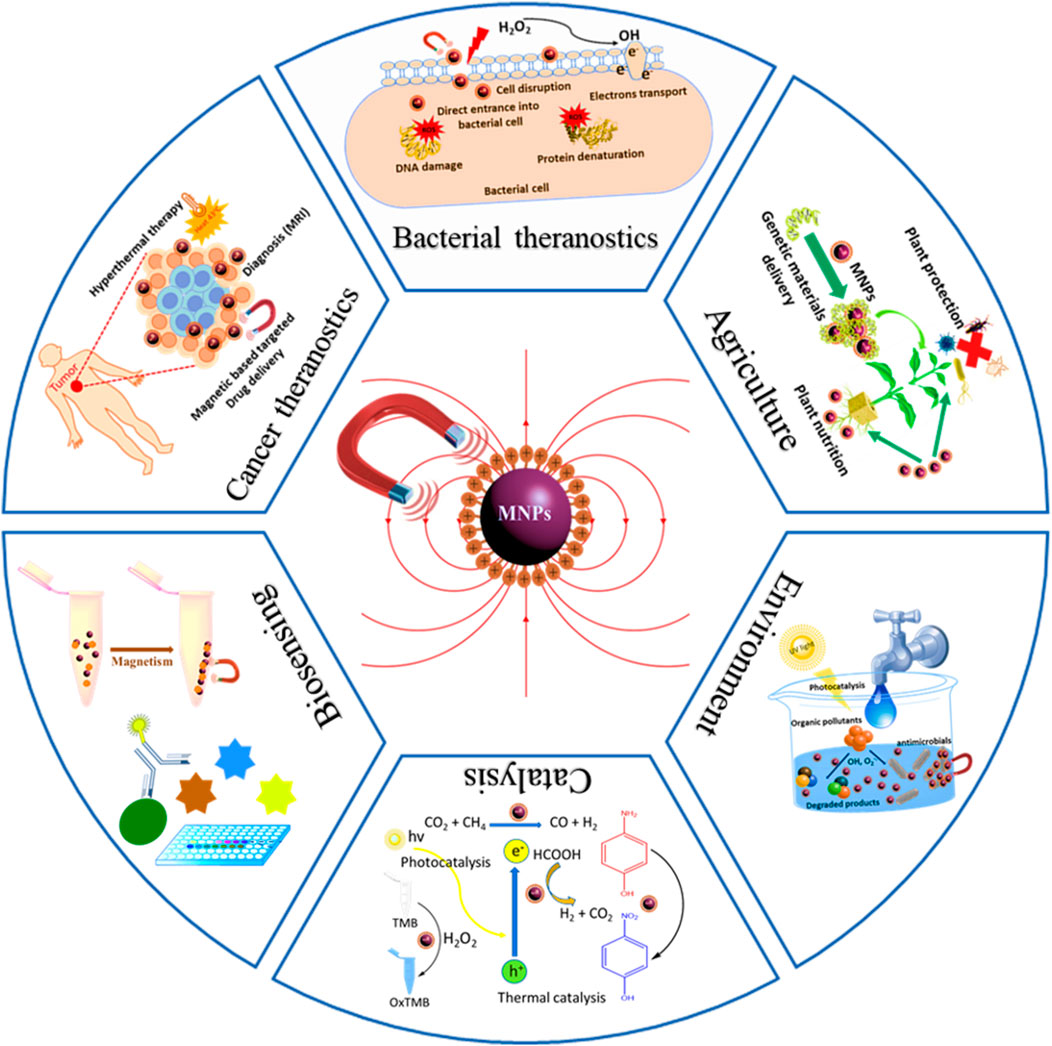
Various applications of magnetic nanoparticles

Most magnetic nanoparticle applications in clinical settings are used for cancer therapies. Magnetic nanoparticles have the ability to target the specific locus of the tumor, use a decreased amount of drug to treat the tumor, and result in decreased off-target effects of the drug. The most common method of introducing magnetic nanoparticles into the body is through intravenous injection; from the site of injection, the nanoparticles travel through the bloodstream. They eventually migrate to the target site with the use of external or implanted magnetic forces.

A pH/magnetic field dual responsive drug loaded nanomicell was developed for targeted magnetothermal synergistic chemotherapy of cancer. In this drug delivery system, after the drug reaches the target site and tumor cell uptake is complete, an external magnetic field is applied causing a magnetothermal effect, raising the tumor cells' temperature and further promoting drug uptake. This nanocarrier system aims to improve drug stability, control drug release, and improve tumor targeting efficacy. This approach has shown increased treatment efficacy over traditional chemotherapy and has not demonstrated any noticeable biotoxicity.

Cardiovascular disease treatment presents as another application of magnetic nanoparticle drug delivery. Atherosclerosis cardiovascular disease is a buildup of plaque in the inner lining of the arteries, and there are models on how magnetic nanoparticle drug delivery could be used as a treatment. However there have not been any in vivo or in vitro studies of magnetic nanoparticles being used to deliver drugs to the arteries to effectively reduce inflammation.

Other potential applications of magnetic nanoparticles are brain imaging and drug delivery past the blood-brain barrier (BBB) using biodegradable magnetic iron oxide nanoparticles. The scope of this application is the treatment of central nervous system (CNS) disorders by functioning as contrast agents and drug carriers. To cross the BBB, these nanoparticles are designed by creating specificity to the BBB; this is achieved by designing the surface of the nanoparticles to be engrafted to ligands, antibodies, small molecules, cell-penetrating peptides, or conjugated RNA to target specific receptors situated along the BBB in order to facilitate entry. As opposed to methods of drug delivery that result in drugs being removed from the cerebrospinal fluid (CSF) or being degraded, magnetic nanoparticle delivery presents an opportunity to protect therapeutics as well as encourage more efficient delivery following the introduction of the nanoparticles. Magnetic nanoparticles can also be used in conjunction with imaging modalities like ultrasound to improve imaging.

The use of nanoparticles in ophthalmic drug delivery is also being explored in clinical research. Magnetic nanoparticles inserted into rats' corneas or administered in an eye drop solution showed high adhesion to the target site. However, the exact mechanism by which the adhesion occurred is still being researched. When the rats were exposed to a bacterial substance that should induce keratitis of the cornea, the amount of inflammation in the treatment group of rats (received the eye drops after exposure) was inhibited. Magnetic nanoparticles have also been used in hyperthermic therapy of cancer, cell purification, biosensing, and immunocytochemical tests.
