= Center of resistance =

Orthodontic terminology

The center of resistance (CRes) is a physical term in orthodontics, referring to a point within the root corresponding to the center of mass of a free body, enabling the analysis of tooth movements and the vectors acting upon them. Unlike a free body, a tooth is naturally restrained by the alveolar bone and periodontal ligament (PDL), whose turnover, significantly during orthodontic treatment, changes its physical properties, making the exact CRes location elusive, preventing a single force vector applied to the tooth from developing translation movement. Therefore, when a force vector or a couple is applied to a tooth, the only movement that can be developed is rotation around the tooth's CRes.

The first to define this point and locate it in the root was Dr. Gilbert D. Fish in 1917. Since then, the CRes, for unknown reasons, have remained in all appliances, fixed or removable, for tooth movement physical-related analyses at the same position in the root.

Bonding fixed orthodontic appliances on the teeth significantly increases tooth restraint from the crown's side, altering the teeth' physical properties by shifting the CRes toward the crown. This artificial restraint affects the ways forces influence tooth movement; for example, a tipping vector or a couple applied when the CRes is at the crown will cause the apex to move much more than the crown tip, resulting in what is defined as orthodontic torque movement. If similar forces are applied when the CRes is at the root, the apex and the crown tip will move almost evenly in opposite directions, resulting in orthodontic tipping. The combination of movements, first around the natural root's CRes and then around the bracket's center, enables orthodontic translational movement, often referred to as Walking. This movement can only be achieved with fixed appliances; removable appliances, including clear aligners, cannot produce such movement since its only restraint is natural.

The concepts related to natural biological restraint and artificial restraint, as well as information about their properties concerning orthodontic treatment, such as the ability to move the CRes of a tooth from the root to the crown and vice versa, controlling the CRes location, enables the movement of teeth, alone or in combination with others, in all directions, were 'developed' by Dr. Naphtali Brezniak and Dr. Noam Portter in 2024.
