= Te Puna West =

Rural settlement in the Bay of Plenty, New Zealand

- Rural settlement
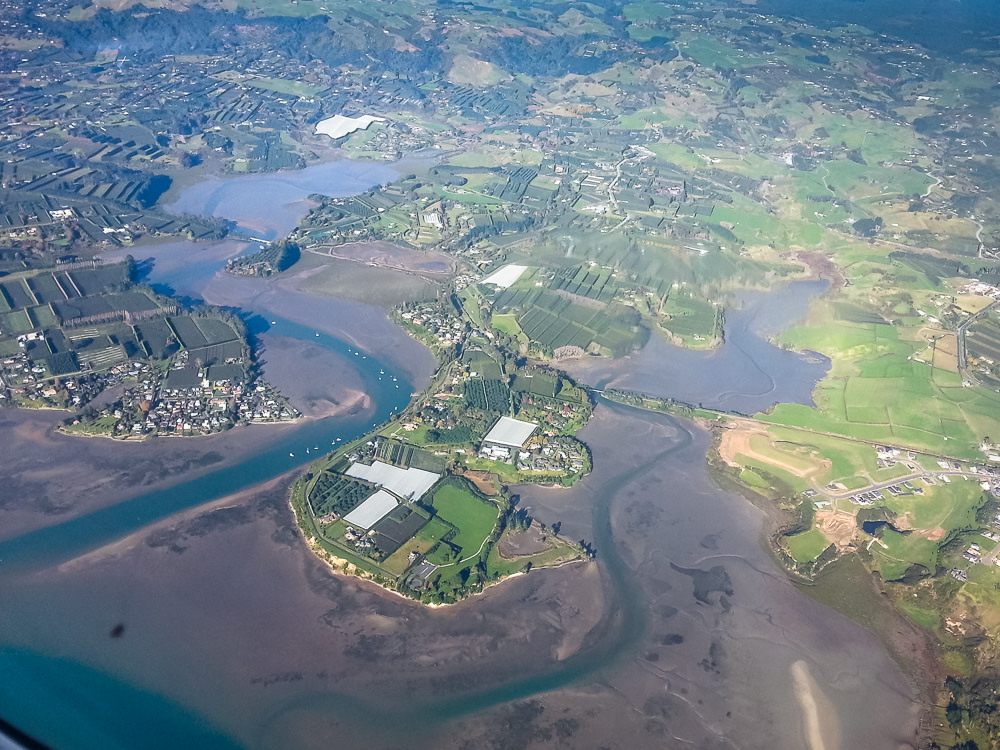
- Te Puna West (middle left)
- Etymology: -
- Interactive map of Te Puna West
- Coordinates: 37.661°S 176.053°E
- Country: New Zealand
- Region: Bay of Plenty
- Territorial authority: Western Bay of Plenty District
- Ward: Kaimai Ward
- Electorates: Tauranga; Waiariki (Māori)

Government
  - Territorial authority: Western Bay of Plenty District Council
  - Regional council: Bay of Plenty Regional Council
  - Mayor of Western Bay of Plenty: James Denyer
  - Tauranga MP: Sam Uffindell
  - Waiariki MP: Rawiri Waititi

Area
  - Total: 0.28 km^{2} (0.11 sq mi)

Population (June 2025)
  - Total: 300
  - Density: 1,100/km^{2} (2,800/sq mi)
- Postcode(s): 3174

Te Puna West is a rural settlement in the Western Bay of Plenty District and Bay of Plenty Region of New Zealand's North Island. It is on a headland on the southern side of Tauranga Harbour, opposite Motuhoa Island, and on the eastern side of Te Puna Estuary, across from Plummers Point. The East Coast Main Trunk forms its southern boundary.

Waitui Reserve is a grassy area with a boat ramp at the point of the headland.

== Demographics ==
Te Puna West is described by Statistics New Zealand as a rural settlement, which covers 0.28 km^{2} (0.11 sq mi). It had an estimated population of 300 as of June 2025, with a population density of 1,071 people per km^{2}. It is part of the larger Te Puna statistical area.

Historical population
Year	Pop.	±% p.a.
2006	381	—
2013	336	−1.78%
2018	315	−1.28%
2023	294	−1.37%
The 2006 population is for a larger area of 1.17 km^{2}. Source:

Te Puna West had a population of 294 in the 2023 New Zealand census, a decrease of 21 people (−6.7%) since the 2018 census, and a decrease of 42 people (−12.5%) since the 2013 census. There were 144 males, 147 females, and 3 people of other genders in 123 dwellings. 4.1% of people identified as LGBTIQ+. The median age was 53.7 years (compared with 38.1 years nationally). There were 42 people (14.3%) aged under 15 years, 30 (10.2%) aged 15 to 29, 135 (45.9%) aged 30 to 64, and 87 (29.6%) aged 65 or older.

People could identify as more than one ethnicity. The results were 93.9% European (Pākehā); 14.3% Māori; 4.1% Pasifika; 2.0% Asian; 1.0% Middle Eastern, Latin American and African New Zealanders (MELAA); and 2.0% other, which includes people giving their ethnicity as "New Zealander". English was spoken by 98.0%, Māori by 2.0%, and other languages by 8.2%. No language could be spoken by 1.0% (e.g. too young to talk). The percentage of people born overseas was 20.4, compared with 28.8% nationally.

Religious affiliations were 32.7% Christian, 1.0% Buddhist, 1.0% New Age, and 1.0% other religions. People who answered that they had no religion were 57.1%, and 7.1% of people did not answer the census question.

Of those at least 15 years old, 69 (27.4%) people had a bachelor's or higher degree, 150 (59.5%) had a post-high school certificate or diploma, and 30 (11.9%) people exclusively held high school qualifications. The median income was $46,300, compared with $41,500 nationally. 57 people (22.6%) earned over $100,000 compared to 12.1% nationally. The employment status of those at least 15 was 117 (46.4%) full-time, 39 (15.5%) part-time, and 3 (1.2%) unemployed.
