= Te Puna =

Settlement in the Bay of Plenty, New Zealand

- Town
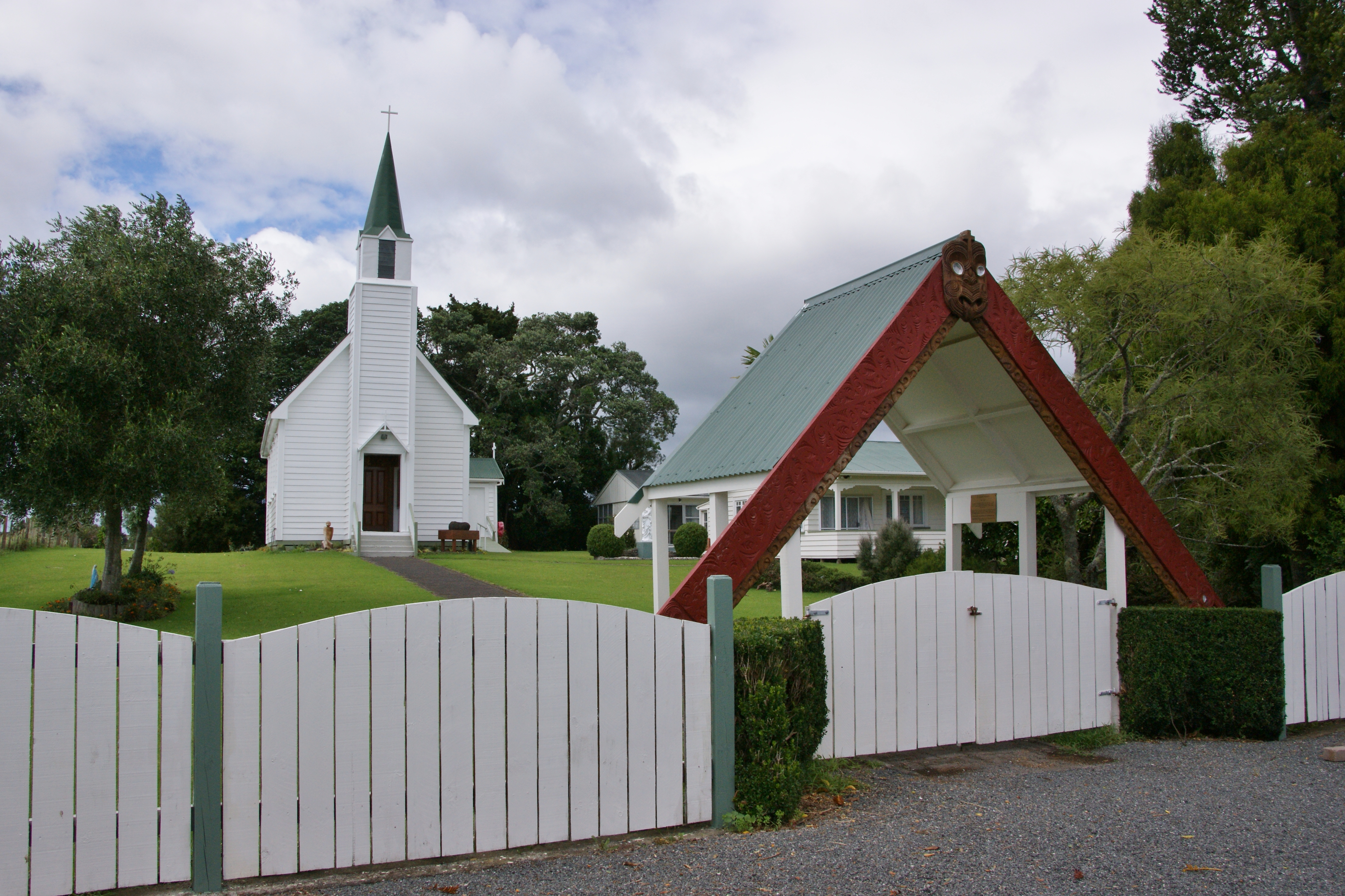
- St Joseph's Church
- Interactive map of Te Puna
- Coordinates: 37.695823°S 176.072806°E
- Country: New Zealand
- Region: Bay of Plenty
- Territorial authority: Western Bay of Plenty District
- Ward: Kaimai
- Electorates: Tauranga; Waiariki (Māori)

Government
  - Territorial authority: Western Bay of Plenty District Council
  - Regional council: Bay of Plenty Regional Council
  - Mayor of Western Bay of Plenty: James Denyer
  - Tauranga MP: Sam Uffindell
  - Waiariki MP: Rawiri Waititi

Area
  - Total: 24.71 km^{2} (9.54 sq mi)

Population (June 2025)
  - Total: 3,090
  - Density: 125/km^{2} (324/sq mi)

Te Puna is a rural community near Tauranga in the Bay of Plenty region of New Zealand's North Island. It is located on State Highway 2, north of Bethlehem and south of Katikati.

The local Te Puna Quarry has been redeveloped by volunteers into a park.

Former National Party leader Todd Muller was raised in Te Puna in the 1970s, where his parents started a kiwifruit orchard. He attended Te Puna Primary School. He entered parliament at the 2014 general election as the MP for Bay of Plenty, and was National Party leader and the Leader of the Opposition from 22 May to 14 July 2020.

== Demographics ==
Te Puna statistical area, which includes Motuhoa Island, Plummers Point and Te Puna West, covers 24.71 km^{2} (9.54 sq mi) and had an estimated population of 3,090 as of June 2025, with a population density of 125 people per km^{2}.

Historical population
| Year | Pop. | ±% p.a. |
|---|---|---|
| 2006 | 2,004 | — |
| 2013 | 2,583 | +3.69% |
| 2018 | 2,931 | +2.56% |
| 2023 | 3,024 | +0.63% |
The 2006 population is for a smaller area of 18.16 km^{2}, excluding Plummers Point. Source:

Te Puna had a population of 3,024 in the 2023 New Zealand census, an increase of 93 people (3.2%) since the 2018 census, and an increase of 441 people (17.1%) since the 2013 census. There were 1,521 males, 1,497 females, and 6 people of other genders in 1,059 dwellings. 1.9% of people identified as LGBTIQ+. The median age was 48.1 years (compared with 38.1 years nationally). There were 525 people (17.4%) aged under 15 years, 444 (14.7%) aged 15 to 29, 1,431 (47.3%) aged 30 to 64, and 624 (20.6%) aged 65 or older.

People could identify as more than one ethnicity. The results were 76.7% European (Pākehā); 30.3% Māori; 3.7% Pasifika; 2.9% Asian; 0.6% Middle Eastern, Latin American and African New Zealanders (MELAA); and 1.8% other, which includes people giving their ethnicity as "New Zealander". English was spoken by 97.5%, Māori by 12.1%, Samoan by 0.1%, and other languages by 5.9%. No language could be spoken by 1.4% (e.g. too young to talk). New Zealand Sign Language was known by 0.5%. The percentage of people born overseas was 16.1, compared with 28.8% nationally.

Religious affiliations were 36.9% Christian, 0.5% Hindu, 4.0% Māori religious beliefs, 0.3% Buddhist, 0.5% New Age, 0.1% Jewish, and 1.1% other religions. People who answered that they had no religion were 49.2%, and 7.5% of people did not answer the census question. Affluent community with many commuters to Tauranga.

Of those at least 15 years old, 579 (23.2%) people had a bachelor's or higher degree, 1,425 (57.0%) had a post-high school certificate or diploma, and 492 (19.7%) people exclusively held high school qualifications. The median income was $42,500, compared with $41,500 nationally. 369 people (14.8%) earned over $100,000 compared to 12.1% nationally. The employment status of those at least 15 was 1,206 (48.3%) full-time, 453 (18.1%) part-time, and 45 (1.8%) unemployed. Effluent ponds emptied from farm sources at point.

== Marae ==
Te Puna has four marae belonging to the Ngāti Ranginui hapū of Pirirākau:

- Paparoa Marae and Werahiko meeting house
- Poutūterangi Marae and Takurua meeting house
- Tutereinga Marae and meeting house
- Tawhitinui and Maka meeting house

== Education ==
Te Puna School is a co-educational state primary school for Year 1 to 8 students, with a roll of 248 as of July 2026. The school opened in 1896 and moved to its current site in 1904.

== Railway stations ==
=== Te Puna railway station ===
Te Puna had a flag station on the East Coast Main Trunk (ECMT) from 16 October 1913 to 21 December 1959, though a special train ran on 29 February 1928 and goods were carried from 5 March. New Zealand Railways (NZR) took over from the Public Works Department (PWD) on 18 June 1928. The station had a shelter shed, cart approach, a 30 ft (9.1 m) by 20 ft (6.1 m) goods shed, cattle and sheep yards, a loading bank and a passing loop for 48 wagons, which remains.

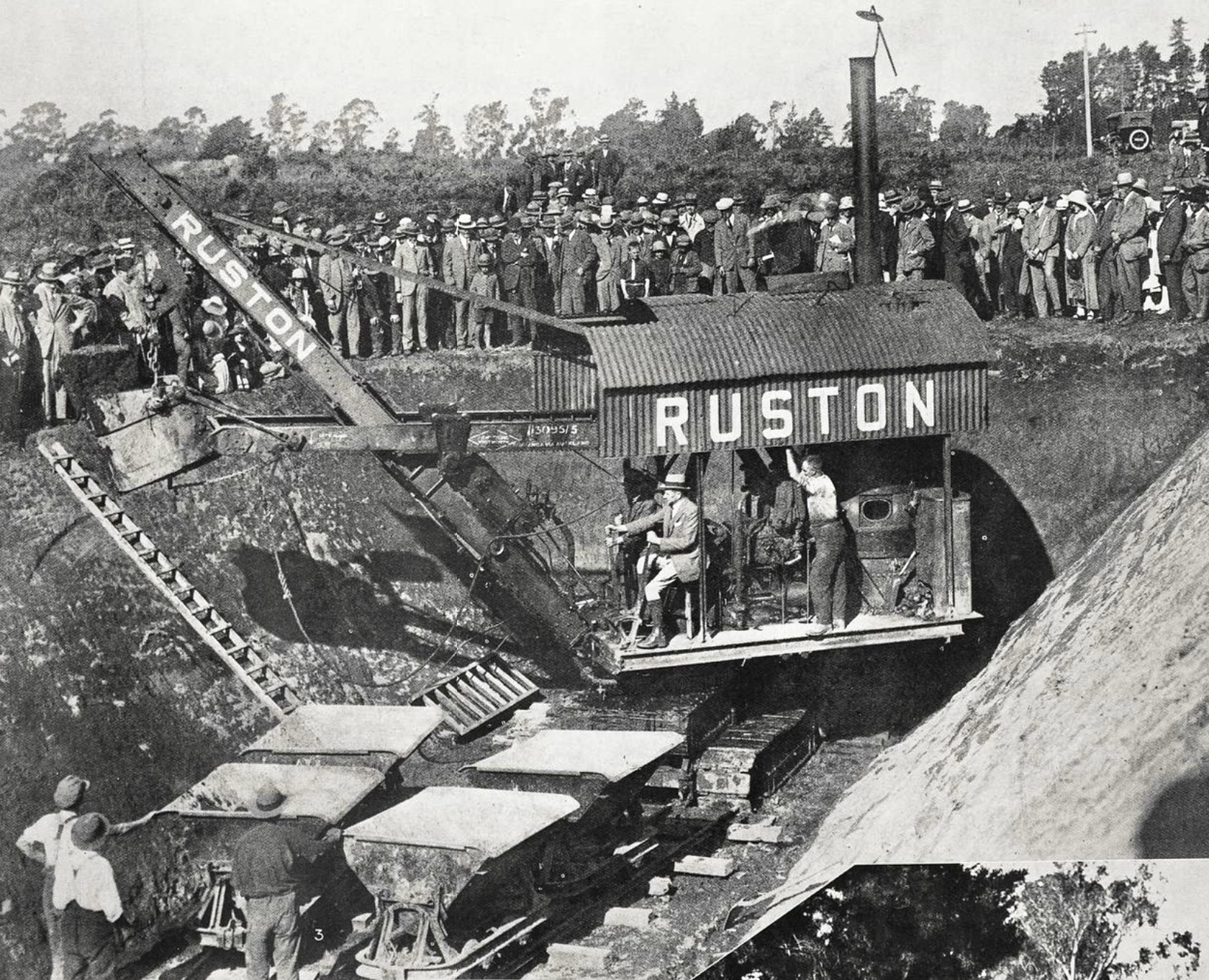
First sod turned for Katikati-Te Puna railway on 8 November 1924

The 6 mi (9.7 km) Tauranga-Te Puna section was built by PWD. The 8 mi (13 km) to Te Maunga was included in the 1911 Railways Authorisation Act. By 1913 it could be used by jiggers, was used to carry sleepers in 1926, but saw little use until formally opened with the whole ECMT on 2 September 1928. At a public meeting in 1924, opinion was divided on the location of the station.

To the north, the first sod was turned for the 18.5 mi (29.8 km) Katikati-Te Puna section by the Minister of Works, Gordon Coates, using a Ruston steam shovel, at Te Puna on 8 November 1924. The section was built by Sir W. G. Armstrong, Whitworth & Co for about £500,000. Due to difficulties in establishing firm foundations for the line and its bridges, it was the last section of the Auckland-Tāneatua line to be completed. It was unusual at the time for contracts to be given to private companies, rather than to PWD, or worker cooperatives. The contractors built a wharf and stacking yard at Mount Maunganui, and landing-stages at several estuaries along the Harbour. They built 100 x 2-man, 13 x 4-man, 66 x 6-man huts, 46 married quarters, 3 cookhouses, 4 bathhouses, 2 recreation-rooms, quarters for field engineers and had two steam-locomotives, six steam-navvies, six petrol-locomotives, two steam pile-drivers, concrete-mixers, launches, punts, motor-lorries and ballast-trucks. Earthworks amounted to 1,229,000 yd^{3} (940,000 m^{3}).

Bridge 62 over the Wairoa River is 257.46m long.

| Preceding station | Historical railways | Following station |
|---|---|---|
| Ōmokoroa; Line open, station closed 5.42 km (3.37 mi); Towards Hamilton | East Coast Main Trunk; New Zealand Railways Department | Otūmoetai; Line open, station closed 5.61 km (3.49 mi); Towards Tāneatua |

=== Borell Road railway station ===
Borell Road replaced Te Puna as a stopping place for railcars from 21 December 1959 to 11 September 1967. It closed for goods on 8 April 1969. It was 1.28 km (0.80 mi) from Te Puna and 4.14 km (2.57 mi) from Ōmokoroa.
