= Waiau, Bay of Plenty =

Locality in the Bay of Plenty, New Zealand

Waiau
- Rural locality
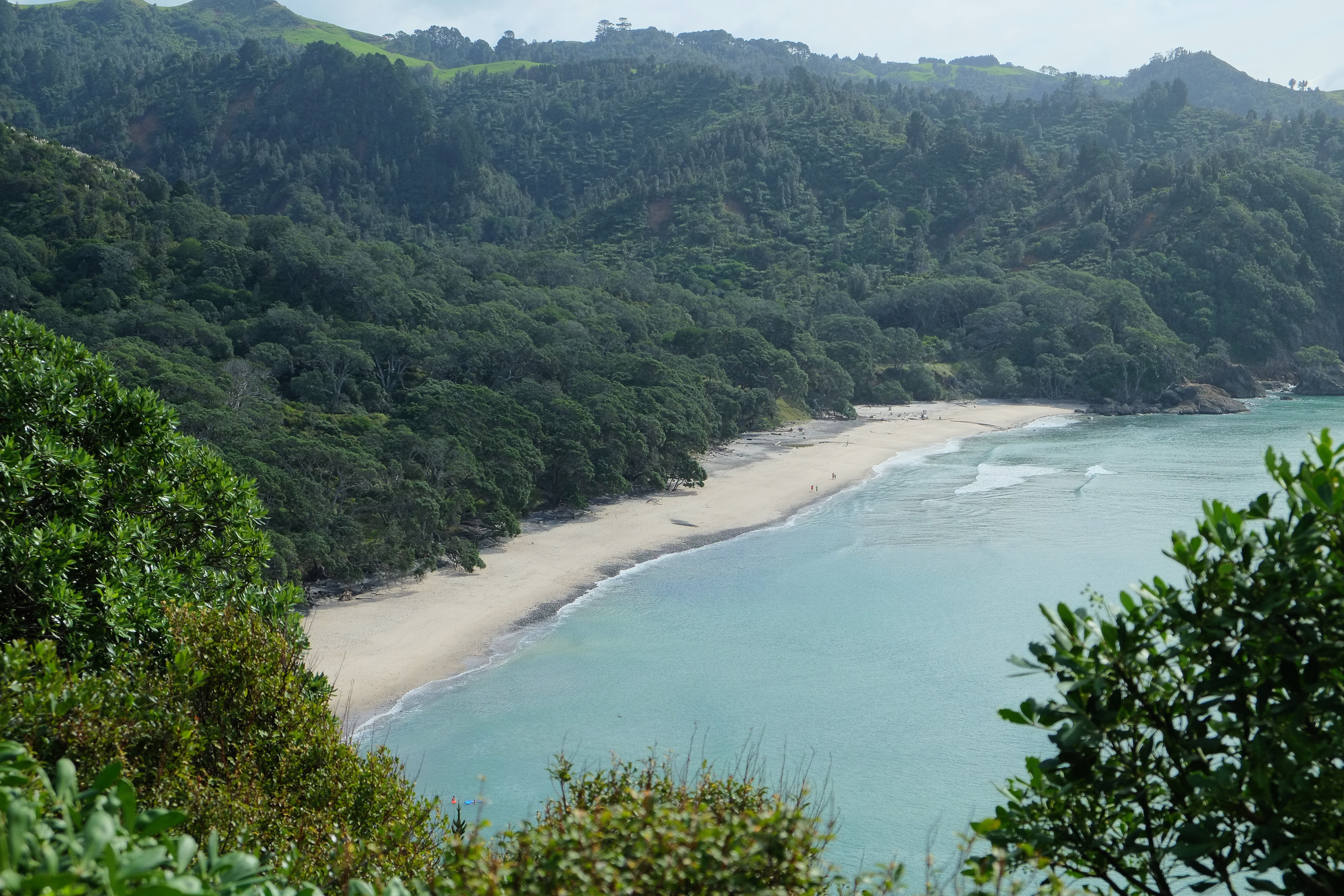
- Orokawa Bay
- Interactive map of Waiau
- Coordinates: 37.455°S 175.902°E
- Country: New Zealand
- Region: Bay of Plenty
- Territorial authority: Western Bay of Plenty District
- Ward: Katikati-Waihi Beach Ward
- Community: Waihi Beach Community
- Electorates: Coromandel; Waiariki and Hauraki-Waikato (Māori)

Government
  - Territorial Authority: Western Bay of Plenty District Council
  - Regional council: Bay of Plenty Regional Council
  - Mayor of Western Bay of Plenty: James Denyer
  - Coromandel MP: Scott Simpson
  - Waiariki and Hauraki-Waikato MPs: Rawiri Waititi and Hana-Rawhiti Maipi-Clarke

Area
  - Total: 36.09 km^{2} (13.93 sq mi)

Population (June 2025)
  - Total: 330
  - Density: 9.1/km^{2} (24/sq mi)

Waiau is a rural locality in the Western Bay of Plenty District of New Zealand. It is on the northern side of Tauranga Harbour, and is east and north from Waihi Beach and east of Athenree. Waiau River and State Highway 2 run through it.

William Wright Falls is a 28m waterfall on Orokawa Stream, in the northern part of the area, accessible by a walking track from Waihi Beach. The track passes through Orokawa Bay.

== Demographics ==
Waiau covers 36.09 km^{2} (13.93 sq mi) and had an estimated population of 330 as of June 2025, with a population density of 9.1 people per km^{2}.

Historical population
Year	Pop.	±% p.a.
2006	276	—
2013	327	+2.45%
2018	333	+0.36%
2023	330	−0.18%

Waiau had a population of 330 in the 2023 New Zealand census, a decrease of 3 people (−0.9%) since the 2018 census, and an increase of 3 people (0.9%) since the 2013 census. There were 174 males and 153 females in 108 dwellings. 1.8% of people identified as LGBTIQ+. The median age was 52.2 years (compared with 38.1 years nationally). There were 45 people (13.6%) aged under 15 years, 51 (15.5%) aged 15 to 29, 150 (45.5%) aged 30 to 64, and 84 (25.5%) aged 65 or older.

People could identify as more than one ethnicity. The results were 79.1% European (Pākehā), 31.8% Māori, 6.4% Pasifika, 0.9% Asian, and 0.9% other, which includes people giving their ethnicity as "New Zealander". English was spoken by 99.1%, Māori by 8.2%, and other languages by 5.5%. No language could be spoken by 0.9% (e.g. too young to talk). The percentage of people born overseas was 14.5, compared with 28.8% nationally.

Religious affiliations were 24.5% Christian, 3.6% Māori religious beliefs, 0.9% New Age, and 0.9% other religions. People who answered that they had no religion were 60.9%, and 10.0% of people did not answer the census question.

Of those at least 15 years old, 36 (12.6%) people had a bachelor's or higher degree, 159 (55.8%) had a post-high school certificate or diploma, and 84 (29.5%) people exclusively held high school qualifications. The median income was $29,800, compared with $41,500 nationally. 21 people (7.4%) earned over $100,000 compared to 12.1% nationally. The employment status of those at least 15 was 129 (45.3%) full-time, 42 (14.7%) part-time, and 15 (5.3%) unemployed.
