= Athenree =

Settlement in the Bay of Plenty, New Zealand

- Rural settlement
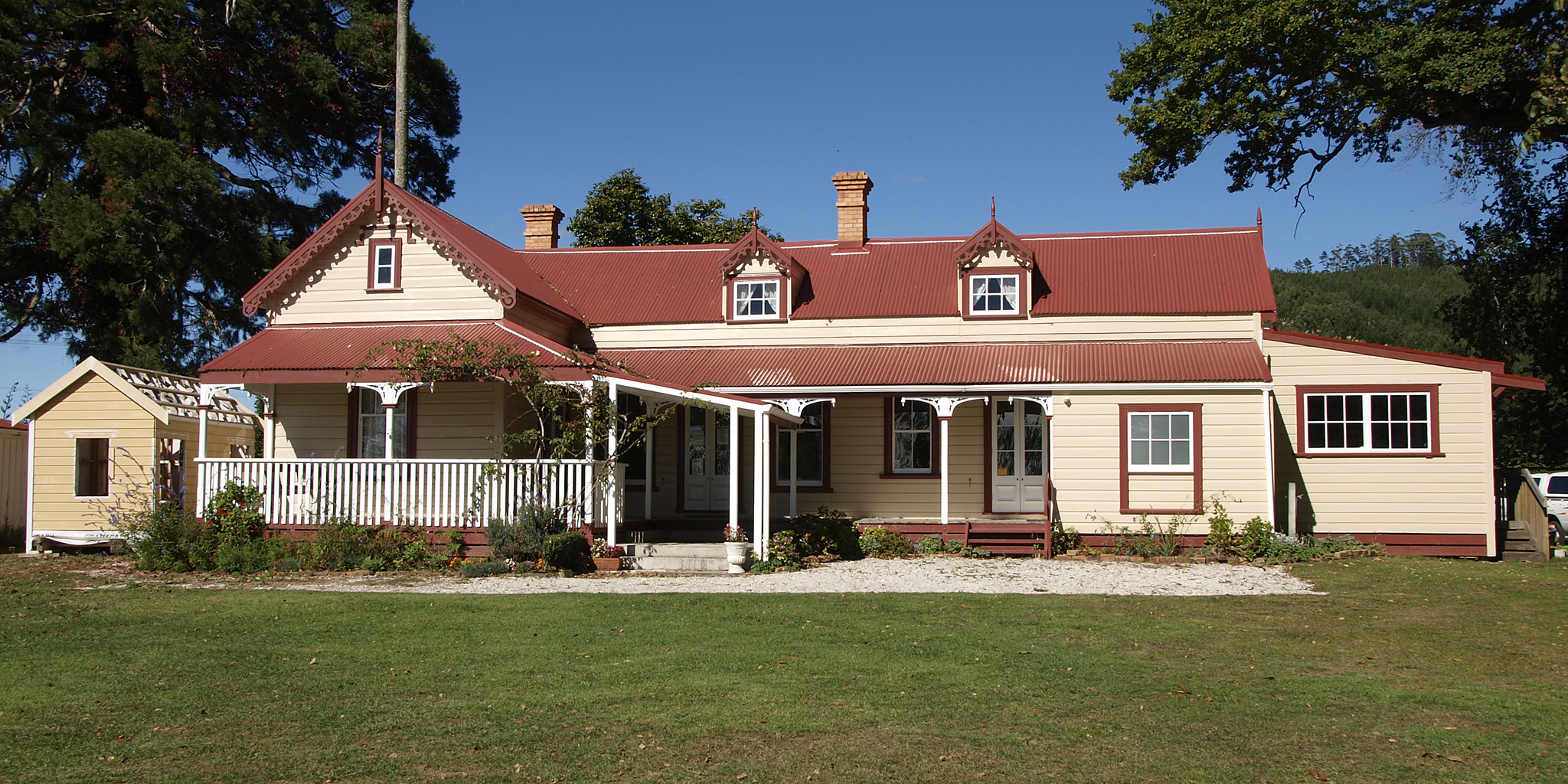
- Athenree Homestead
- Interactive map of Athenree
- Coordinates: 37.444°S 175.963°E
- Country: New Zealand
- Region: Bay of Plenty
- Territorial authority: Western Bay of Plenty District
- Ward: Katikati-Waihi Beach Ward
- Community: Waihi Beach Community
- Established: 1878
- Electorates: Coromandel; Waiariki (Māori)

Government
  - Territorial Authority: Western Bay of Plenty District Council
  - Regional council: Bay of Plenty Regional Council
  - Mayor of Western Bay of Plenty: James Denyer
  - Coromandel MP: Scott Simpson
  - Waiariki MP: Rawiri Waititi

Area
  - Total: 1.26 km^{2} (0.49 sq mi)

Population (June 2025)
  - Total: 900
  - Density: 710/km^{2} (1,800/sq mi)

Athenree is a coastal town in the Western Bay of Plenty District of New Zealand. It is on the northern side of Tauranga Harbour, and separated from Waihi Beach by the Waiau River on its north and east side.

The area includes a holiday park with hot springs and Athenree Wetland, which includes a walking track.

The settlement was named for Athenry in Country Galway, Ireland by settlers arriving in 1878, including Captain Hugh Stewart (a brother of George Vesey Stewart) and his wife, Adela Blanche Stewart, who wrote a book about her experiences called My Simple Life in New Zealand. The settlement was initially successful due to the 1878 opening of the Martha gold mine in Waihi, and later because of dairy farming.

== Demographics ==
Stats NZ describes Athenree as a rural settlement, which covers 1.26 km^{2} (0.49 sq mi). It had an estimated population of 900 as of June 2025, with a population density of 714 people per km^{2}.

Historical population
Year	Pop.	±% p.a.
2006	612	—
2013	675	+1.41%
2018	804	+3.56%
2023	906	+2.42%

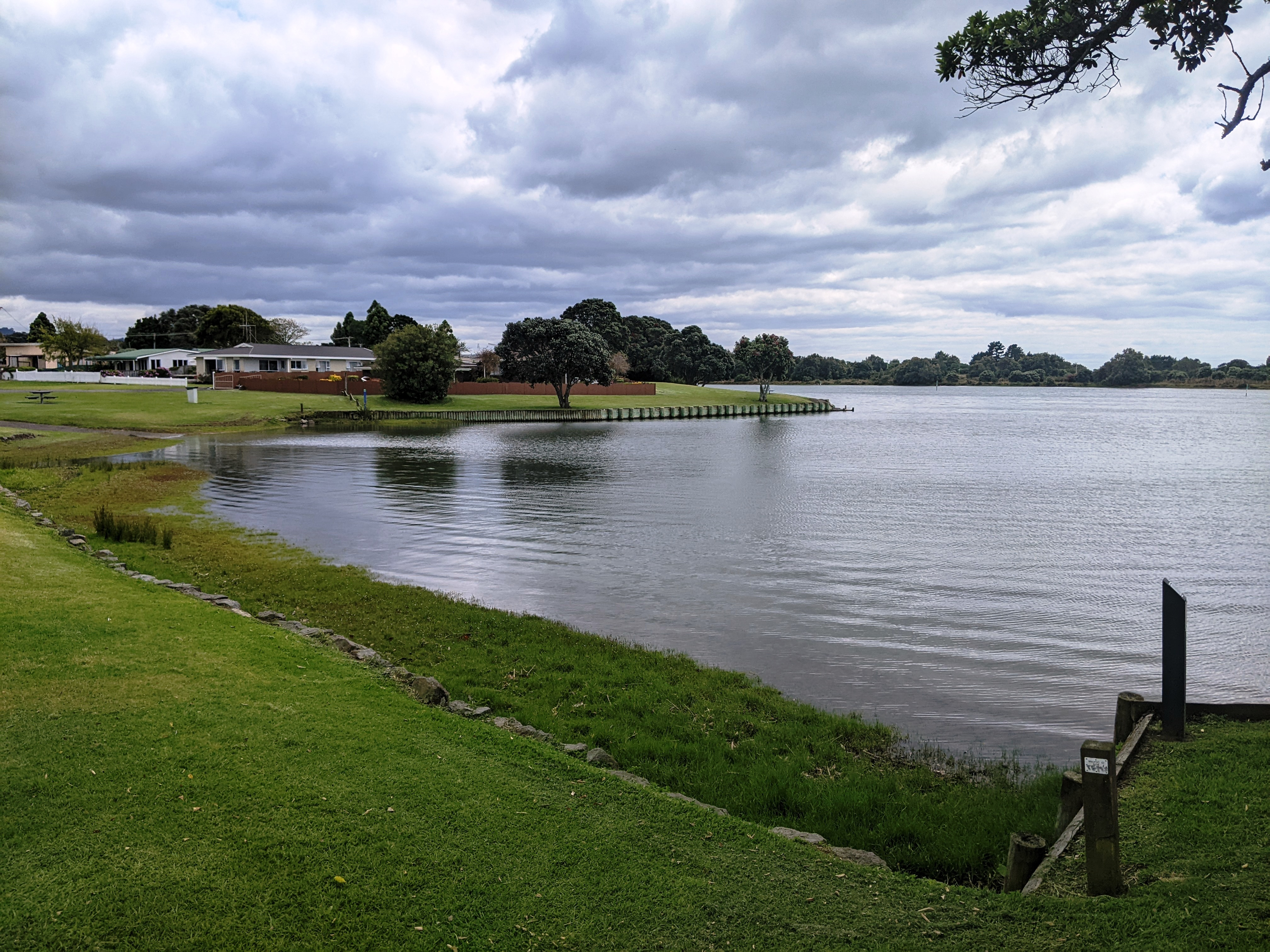
Waione Avenue Reserve on the Waiau River

Athenree had a population of 906 in the 2023 New Zealand census, an increase of 102 people (12.7%) since the 2018 census, and an increase of 231 people (34.2%) since the 2013 census. There were 444 males, 459 females, and 3 people of other genders in 345 dwellings. 1.7% of people identified as LGBTIQ+. The median age was 55.0 years (compared with 38.1 years nationally). There were 138 people (15.2%) aged under 15 years, 87 (9.6%) aged 15 to 29, 366 (40.4%) aged 30 to 64, and 315 (34.8%) aged 65 or older.

People could identify as more than one ethnicity. The results were 90.7% European (Pākehā); 18.2% Māori; 1.3% Pasifika; 2.0% Asian; 0.7% Middle Eastern, Latin American and African New Zealanders (MELAA); and 2.6% other, which includes people giving their ethnicity as "New Zealander". English was spoken by 98.0%, Māori by 3.0%, and other languages by 4.3%. No language could be spoken by 1.3% (e.g. too young to talk). New Zealand Sign Language was known by 0.3%. The percentage of people born overseas was 19.5, compared with 28.8% nationally.

Religious affiliations were 29.5% Christian, 0.3% Hindu, 0.7% Māori religious beliefs, 0.3% Buddhist, 0.3% New Age, and 0.7% other religions. People who answered that they had no religion were 59.6%, and 8.9% of people did not answer the census question.

Of those at least 15 years old, 156 (20.3%) people had a bachelor's or higher degree, 414 (53.9%) had a post-high school certificate or diploma, and 201 (26.2%) people exclusively held high school qualifications. The median income was $30,500, compared with $41,500 nationally. 69 people (9.0%) earned over $100,000 compared to 12.1% nationally. The employment status of those at least 15 was 273 (35.5%) full-time, 141 (18.4%) part-time, and 12 (1.6%) unemployed.
