= Kopurererua =

Rural community in the Bay of Plenty, New Zealand

- Rural community
- Interactive map of Kopurererua
- Coordinates: 37.777°S 176.099°E
- Country: New Zealand
- Region: Bay of Plenty
- Territorial authority: Western Bay of Plenty District
- Ward: Kaimai Ward
- Electorates: Tauranga; Rotorua; Waiariki (Māori)

Government
  - Territorial authority: Western Bay of Plenty District Council
  - Regional council: Bay of Plenty Regional Council
  - Mayor of Western Bay of Plenty: James Denyer
  - Tauranga MP/Rotorua MP: Sam Uffindell/Todd McClay
  - Waiariki MP: Rawiri Waititi

Area
  - Total: 14.10 km^{2} (5.44 sq mi)

Population (June 2025)
  - Total: 790
  - Density: 56/km^{2} (150/sq mi)
- Postcode(s): 3173

Kopurererua is a rural community in the upper valley of the Kopurererua Stream in the Western Bay of Plenty District and Bay of Plenty Region of New Zealand's North Island. The lower Kopurererua valley is in Tauranga.

== Demographics ==
Kopurererua statistical area covers 14.10 km^{2} (5.44 sq mi) and had an estimated population of 790 as of June 2025, with a population density of 56 people per km^{2}.

Historical population
Year	Pop.	±% p.a.
2006	987	—
2013	669	−5.40%
2018	756	+2.48%
2023	777	+0.55%
The 2006 population is for a larger area of 20.27 km^{2}. Source:

Kopurererua had a population of 777 in the 2023 New Zealand census, an increase of 21 people (2.8%) since the 2018 census, and an increase of 108 people (16.1%) since the 2013 census. There were 399 males, 375 females, and 3 people of other genders in 276 dwellings. 2.3% of people identified as LGBTIQ+. The median age was 48.7 years (compared with 38.1 years nationally). There were 120 people (15.4%) aged under 15 years, 114 (14.7%) aged 15 to 29, 363 (46.7%) aged 30 to 64, and 177 (22.8%) aged 65 or older.

People could identify as more than one ethnicity. The results were 93.4% European (Pākehā), 13.1% Māori, 0.4% Pasifika, 1.5% Asian, and 2.7% other, which includes people giving their ethnicity as "New Zealander". English was spoken by 98.1%, Māori by 1.2%, and other languages by 4.6%. No language could be spoken by 1.5% (e.g. too young to talk). New Zealand Sign Language was known by 0.4%. The percentage of people born overseas was 15.4, compared with 28.8% nationally.

Religious affiliations were 33.2% Christian, 0.4% Islam, 0.8% Māori religious beliefs, 0.4% Buddhist, 0.4% New Age, and 1.5% other religions. People who answered that they had no religion were 53.7%, and 9.7% of people did not answer the census question.

Of those at least 15 years old, 144 (21.9%) people had a bachelor's or higher degree, 363 (55.3%) had a post-high school certificate or diploma, and 150 (22.8%) people exclusively held high school qualifications. The median income was $45,900, compared with $41,500 nationally. 132 people (20.1%) earned over $100,000 compared to 12.1% nationally. The employment status of those at least 15 was 324 (49.3%) full-time, 105 (16.0%) part-time, and 15 (2.3%) unemployed.
