= Plummers Point =

Rural settlement in the Bay of Plenty, New Zealand

- Rural settlement
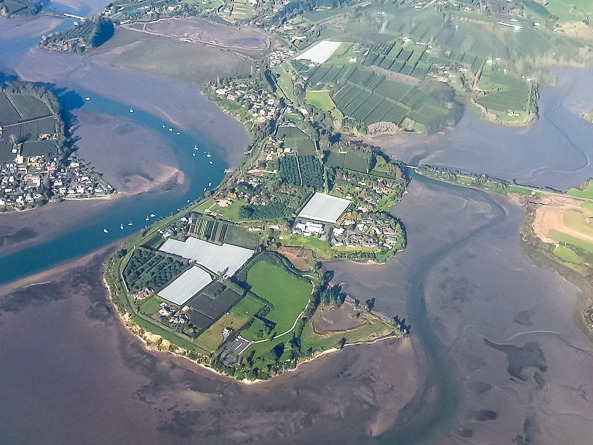
- Plummers Point
- Interactive map of Plummers Point
- Coordinates: 37.658°S 176.047°E
- Country: New Zealand
- Region: Bay of Plenty
- Territorial authority: Western Bay of Plenty District
- Ward: Kaimai Ward
- Electorates: Coromandel; Waiariki (Māori)

Government
  - Territorial Authority: Western Bay of Plenty District Council
  - Regional council: Bay of Plenty Regional Council
  - Mayor of Western Bay of Plenty: James Denyer
  - Coromandel MP: Scott Simpson
  - Waiariki MP: Rawiri Waititi

Area
  - Total: 0.62 km^{2} (0.24 sq mi)

Population (June 2025)
  - Total: 190
  - Density: 310/km^{2} (790/sq mi)
- Postcode(s): 3172

Plummers Point is a rural settlement in the Western Bay of Plenty District and Bay of Plenty Region of New Zealand's North Island. It is on a headland on the southern side of Tauranga Harbour, opposite Motuhoa Island, and between Mangawhai Bay and Te Puna Estuary. The East Coast Main Trunk forms its southern boundary.

Ongarahu Pā is on 12 to 15 metre-high cliffs at the northern end. It is well-preserved and a tourist attraction.

== Demographics ==
Plummers Point is described by Statistics New Zealand as a rural settlement, which covers 0.62 km^{2} (0.24 sq mi). It had an estimated population of 190 as of June 2025, with a population density of 306 people per km^{2}. It is part of the larger Te Puna statistical area.

Historical population
Year	Pop.	±% p.a.
2006	132	—
2013	168	+3.51%
2018	189	+2.38%
2023	189	+0.00%
The 2006 population is for a smaller area of 0.60 km^{2}. Source:

Plummers Point had a population of 189 in the 2023 New Zealand census, unchanged since the 2018 census, and an increase of 21 people (12.5%) since the 2013 census. There were 84 males, 102 females, and 3 people of other genders in 72 dwellings. 1.6% of people identified as LGBTIQ+. The median age was 54.8 years (compared with 38.1 years nationally). There were 30 people (15.9%) aged under 15 years, 18 (9.5%) aged 15 to 29, 78 (41.3%) aged 30 to 64, and 60 (31.7%) aged 65 or older.

People could identify as more than one ethnicity. The results were 95.2% European (Pākehā), 9.5% Māori, 3.2% Pasifika, 1.6% Asian, and 3.2% other, which includes people giving their ethnicity as "New Zealander". English was spoken by 98.4%, Māori by 1.6%, and other languages by 7.9%. No language could be spoken by 1.6% (e.g. too young to talk). The percentage of people born overseas was 23.8, compared with 28.8% nationally.

Religious affiliations were 31.7% Christian. People who answered that they had no religion were 63.5%, and 3.2% of people did not answer the census question.

Of those at least 15 years old, 48 (30.2%) people had a bachelor's or higher degree, 87 (54.7%) had a post-high school certificate or diploma, and 24 (15.1%) people exclusively held high school qualifications. The median income was $47,900, compared with $41,500 nationally. 27 people (17.0%) earned over $100,000 compared to 12.1% nationally. The employment status of those at least 15 was 66 (41.5%) full-time, 33 (20.8%) part-time, and 3 (1.9%) unemployed.
