= Otawa =

Rural community in the Bay of Plenty, New Zealand

- Rural community
- Interactive map of Otawa
- Coordinates: 37.800°S 176.246°E
- Country: New Zealand
- Region: Bay of Plenty
- Territorial authority: Western Bay of Plenty District
- Ward: Maketu-Te Puke
- Community: Te Puke Community
- Electorates: Rotorua; Waiariki (Māori)

Government
  - Territorial authority: Western Bay of Plenty District Council
  - Regional council: Bay of Plenty Regional Council
  - Mayor of Western Bay of Plenty: James Denyer
  - Rotorua MP: Todd McClay
  - Waiariki MP: Rawiri Waititi

Area
  - Total: 152.28 km^{2} (58.80 sq mi)

Population (June 2025)
  - Total: 2,390
  - Density: 15.7/km^{2} (40.6/sq mi)
- Postcode(s): 3183

Otawa is a rural area in the Western Bay of Plenty District and Bay of Plenty Region of New Zealand's North Island. The Otawa Scenic Reserve has several walking tracks varying between 30 minutes and four hours return. The tracks are described as advanced. The peak of Otawa is 565 metres.

== Demographics ==
Otawa statistical area covers 152.28 km^{2} (58.80 sq mi) north, west and southwest of Te Puke. It had an estimated population of 2,390 as of June 2025, with a population density of 16 people per km^{2}.

Historical population
Year	Pop.	±% p.a.
2006	1,650	—
2013	1,776	+1.06%
2018	1,983	+2.23%
2023	2,130	+1.44%
The 2006 population is for a smaller area of 151.68 km^{2}. Source:

Otawa had a population of 2,130 in the 2023 New Zealand census, an increase of 147 people (7.4%) since the 2018 census, and an increase of 354 people (19.9%) since the 2013 census. There were 1,101 males, 1,023 females, and 9 people of other genders in 693 dwellings. 3.2% of people identified as LGBTIQ+. The median age was 42.4 years (compared with 38.1 years nationally). There were 411 people (19.3%) aged under 15 years, 360 (16.9%) aged 15 to 29, 993 (46.6%) aged 30 to 64, and 366 (17.2%) aged 65 or older.

People could identify as more than one ethnicity. The results were 86.3% European (Pākehā); 18.0% Māori; 3.1% Pasifika; 6.2% Asian; 0.7% Middle Eastern, Latin American and African New Zealanders (MELAA); and 2.3% other, which includes people giving their ethnicity as "New Zealander". English was spoken by 95.9%, Māori by 3.9%, Samoan by 0.6%, and other languages by 10.0%. No language could be spoken by 2.0% (e.g. too young to talk). New Zealand Sign Language was known by 0.3%. The percentage of people born overseas was 16.1, compared with 28.8% nationally.

Religious affiliations were 26.3% Christian, 0.4% Hindu, 1.8% Māori religious beliefs, 0.8% Buddhist, 0.7% New Age, and 4.6% other religions. People who answered that they had no religion were 55.6%, and 9.9% of people did not answer the census question.

Of those at least 15 years old, 285 (16.6%) people had a bachelor's or higher degree, 1,038 (60.4%) had a post-high school certificate or diploma, and 396 (23.0%) people exclusively held high school qualifications. The median income was $45,900, compared with $41,500 nationally. 228 people (13.3%) earned over $100,000 compared to 12.1% nationally. The employment status of those at least 15 was 927 (53.9%) full-time, 285 (16.6%) part-time, and 51 (3.0%) unemployed.
