= Minden, New Zealand =

Rural community in the Bay of Plenty, New Zealand

Minden
- Rural community
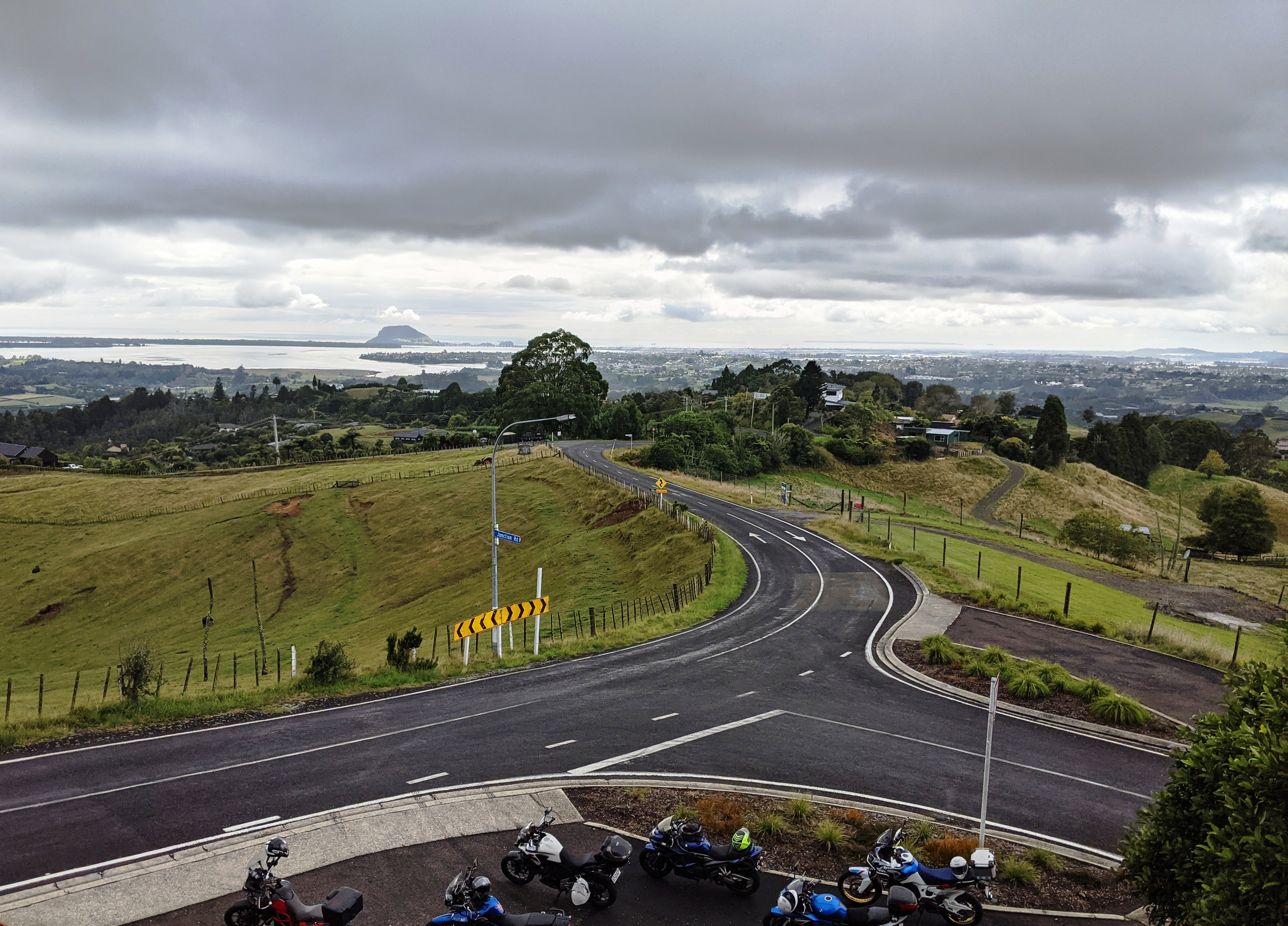
- View NW from Minden lookout
- Interactive map of Minden
- Coordinates: 37.712°S 176.056°E
- Country: New Zealand
- Region: Bay of Plenty
- Territorial authority: Western Bay of Plenty District
- Ward: Kaimai Ward
- Electorates: Tauranga; Waiariki (Māori)

Government
  - Territorial authority: Western Bay of Plenty District Council
  - Regional council: Bay of Plenty Regional Council
  - Mayor of Western Bay of Plenty: James Denyer
  - Tauranga MP: Sam Uffindell
  - Waiariki MP: Rawiri Waititi

Area
  - Total: 85.95 km^{2} (33.19 sq mi)

Population (June 2025)
  - Total: 2,530
  - Density: 29.4/km^{2} (76.2/sq mi)
- Postcode(s): 3176

Minden is a rural community in the Western Bay of Plenty District and Bay of Plenty Region of New Zealand's North Island. The peak that the area is named after was named after the 1759 Battle of Minden in Prussia by a soldier stationed in Tauranga in 1866 after the Tauranga campaign.

The Minden Lookout on the corner of Minden and Junction roads provides views over Tauranga. In March 2023 the Minden Lookout was temporarily closed due to failure to meet health and safety standards. The structure was demolished in mid-2024, and a replacement single-storey covered platform is now under construction. It is expected to be completed by January 2026.

The Minden Scenic Reserve has a 15-minute loop walk from Ainsworth Road.

Minden Peak is at 288 metres above sea level, and can be accessed via the Minden Stairs, with over 320 steps.

== Demographics ==
Minden statistical area covers 85.95 km^{2} (33.19 sq mi) and had an estimated population of 2,530 as of June 2025, with a population density of 29 people per km^{2}.

Historical population
Year	Pop.	±% p.a.
2006	1,608	—
2013	1,731	+1.06%
2018	2,133	+4.27%
2023	2,367	+2.10%

Minden had a population of 2,367 in the 2023 New Zealand census, an increase of 234 people (11.0%) since the 2018 census, and an increase of 636 people (36.7%) since the 2013 census. There were 1,182 males, 1,179 females, and 6 people of other genders in 807 dwellings. 1.8% of people identified as LGBTIQ+. The median age was 43.8 years (compared with 38.1 years nationally). There were 465 people (19.6%) aged under 15 years, 348 (14.7%) aged 15 to 29, 1,107 (46.8%) aged 30 to 64, and 441 (18.6%) aged 65 or older.

People could identify as more than one ethnicity. The results were 90.7% European (Pākehā); 13.1% Māori; 1.5% Pasifika; 3.2% Asian; 0.4% Middle Eastern, Latin American and African New Zealanders (MELAA); and 3.5% other, which includes people giving their ethnicity as "New Zealander". English was spoken by 97.7%, Māori by 3.2%, Samoan by 0.1%, and other languages by 7.7%. No language could be spoken by 1.8% (e.g. too young to talk). New Zealand Sign Language was known by 0.3%. The percentage of people born overseas was 20.3, compared with 28.8% nationally.

Religious affiliations were 33.2% Christian, 0.6% Hindu, 0.1% Islam, 1.4% Māori religious beliefs, 0.1% Buddhist, 0.5% New Age, and 1.0% other religions. People who answered that they had no religion were 55.8%, and 7.6% of people did not answer the census question.

Of those at least 15 years old, 528 (27.8%) people had a bachelor's or higher degree, 1,041 (54.7%) had a post-high school certificate or diploma, and 333 (17.5%) people exclusively held high school qualifications. The median income was $47,800, compared with $41,500 nationally. 330 people (17.4%) earned over $100,000 compared to 12.1% nationally. The employment status of those at least 15 was 939 (49.4%) full-time, 333 (17.5%) part-time, and 36 (1.9%) unemployed.
