= Waihi Beach =

Town in the Bay of Plenty, New Zealand

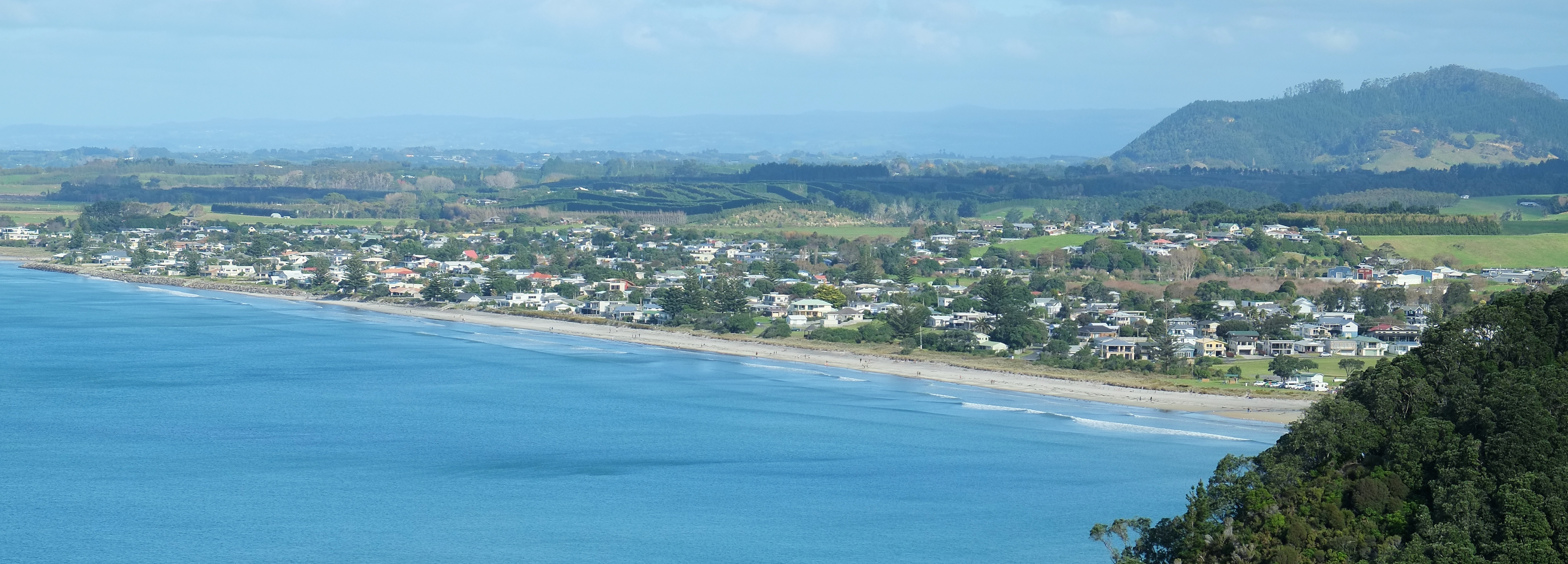
- Waihi Beach
- Interactive map of Waihi Beach
- Coordinates: 37.411°S 175.941°E
- Country: New Zealand
- Region: Bay of Plenty
- Territorial authority: Western Bay of Plenty District
- Ward: Katikati - Waihi Beach Ward
- Community: Waihi Beach Community
- Electorates: Coromandel; Waiariki and Hauraki-Waikato (Māori)

Government
  - Territorial Authority: Western Bay of Plenty District Council
  - Regional council: Bay of Plenty Regional Council
  - Mayor of Western Bay of Plenty: James Denyer
  - Coromandel MP: Scott Simpson
  - Waiariki and Hauraki-Waikato MPs: Rawiri Waititi and Hana-Rawhiti Maipi-Clarke

Area
  - Total: 6.31 km^{2} (2.44 sq mi)

Population (June 2025)
  - Total: 2,620
  - Density: 415/km^{2} (1,080/sq mi)

Waihi Beach is a coastal town at the western end of the Bay of Plenty in New Zealand's North Island. It lies 10 kilometres to the east of the town of Waihi, at the foot of the Coromandel Peninsula. The main beach is 10 kilometres long. The town had a permanent population of 2,620 as of June 2025.

At the northern end of Waihi Beach, the 145 hectares (360 acres) Orokawa Scenic Reserve offers several short walking tracks along the coast and to Orokawa Bay. While the main beach is backed by the residential area of the township of Waihi Beach, Orokawa Bay is undeveloped and surrounded by native bush including pōhutukawa, pūriri, and nīkau palms.

At the southern end of the beach is the small settlement of Bowentown and the northern side of the northern Katikati entrance to Tauranga Harbour.

== History and culture ==
=== Early history ===
Māori have lived in the region since pre-European times, with numerous pā sites within a few kilometres of Waihi Beach. There is still evidence of the old pā sites at the Bowentown end of Waihi Beach.

The name Waihi ("Rising Water") is said to be named after a stream which flows into the beach, the later town of Waihi taking its name from the name for the beach.

=== Modern history ===
The Waihi Beach Hotel was built in 1967 and the Athenree mineral hot springs are located nearby. Nearby Waihi is known for the gold and silver mining operation at Martha Mine and several underground mines.

=== Marae ===
Otāwhiwhi Marae, located in Bowentown, is a marae (tribal meeting ground) of the Ngāi Te Rangi tribe and Ngāi Tauwhao sub-tribe; it includes the Tamaoho wharenui (meeting house).

In October 2020, the Government committed $500,000 from the Provincial Growth Fund to upgrade the marae. The upgrade is expected to create 33 jobs.

== Demographics ==
Stats NZ describes Waihi Beach-Bowentown as a small urban area which covers 6.31 km^{2} (2.44 sq mi). It had an estimated population of 2,620 as of June 2025, with a population density of 415 people per km^{2}.

Historical population
Year	Pop.	±% p.a.
2006	2,058	—
2013	2,148	+0.61%
2018	2,484	+2.95%
2023	2,550	+0.53%

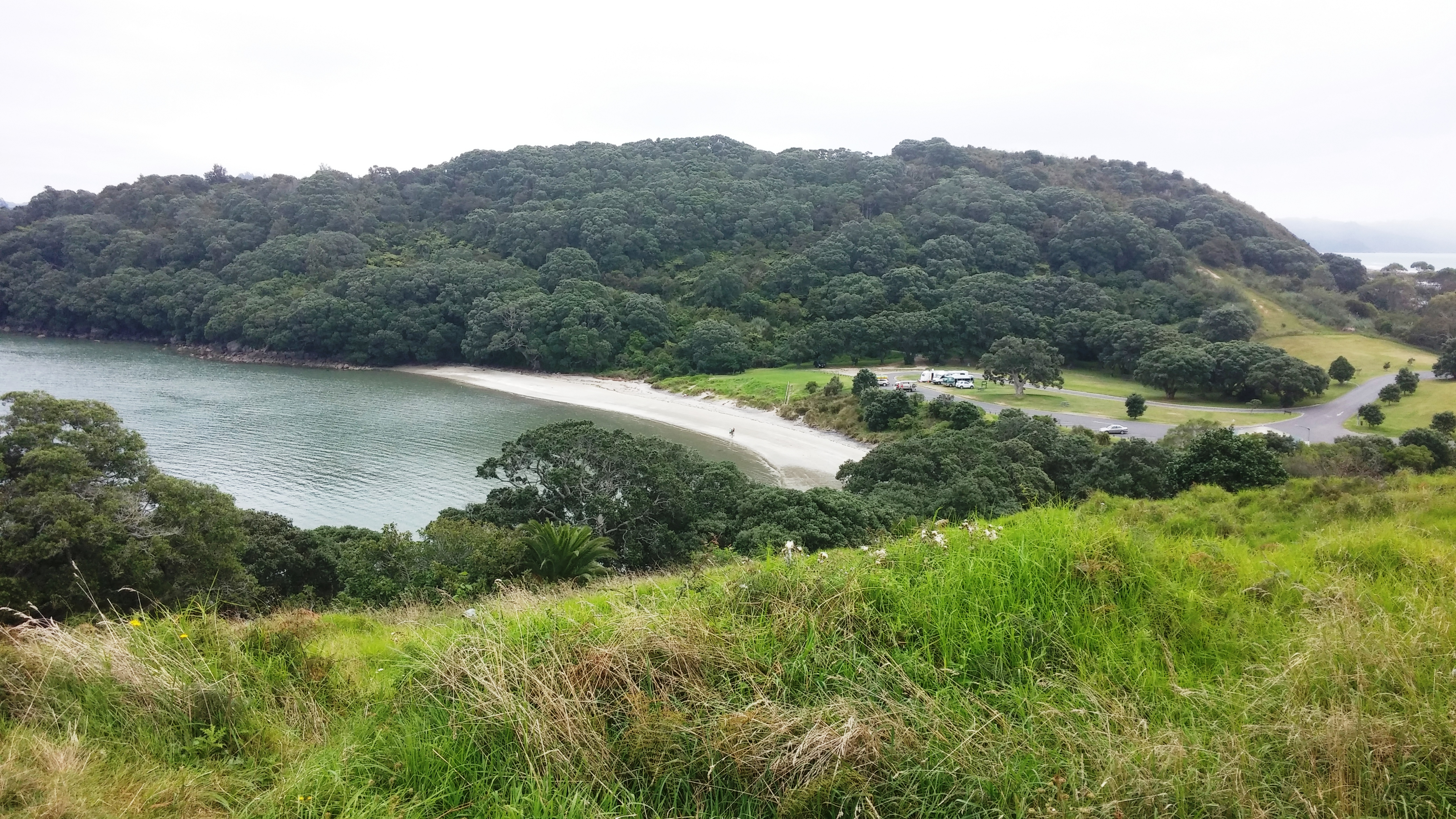
Anzac Bay from Bowentown lookout

Waihi Beach-Bowentown had a population of 2,550 in the 2023 New Zealand census, an increase of 66 people (2.7%) since the 2018 census, and an increase of 402 people (18.7%) since the 2013 census. There were 1,209 males, 1,338 females, and 3 people of other genders in 1,200 dwellings. 2.0% of people identified as LGBTIQ+. The median age was 58.8 years (compared with 38.1 years nationally). There were 306 people (12.0%) aged under 15 years, 252 (9.9%) aged 15 to 29, 1,056 (41.4%) aged 30 to 64, and 939 (36.8%) aged 65 or older.

People could identify as more than one ethnicity. The results were 91.4% European (Pākehā); 16.6% Māori; 1.3% Pasifika; 1.3% Asian; 0.2% Middle Eastern, Latin American and African New Zealanders (MELAA); and 2.6% other, which includes people giving their ethnicity as "New Zealander". English was spoken by 98.6%, Māori by 2.5%, Samoan by 0.1%, and other languages by 4.5%. No language could be spoken by 1.2% (e.g. too young to talk). New Zealand Sign Language was known by 0.5%. The percentage of people born overseas was 12.2, compared with 28.8% nationally.

Religious affiliations were 31.1% Christian, 0.4% Hindu, 0.7% Māori religious beliefs, 0.1% Buddhist, 0.6% New Age, 0.1% Jewish, and 1.2% other religions. People who answered that they had no religion were 58.6%, and 7.5% of people did not answer the census question.

Of those at least 15 years old, 471 (21.0%) people had a bachelor's or higher degree, 1,281 (57.1%) had a post-high school certificate or diploma, and 486 (21.7%) people exclusively held high school qualifications. The median income was $34,200, compared with $41,500 nationally. 276 people (12.3%) earned over $100,000 compared to 12.1% nationally. The employment status of those at least 15 was 822 (36.6%) full-time, 360 (16.0%) part-time, and 42 (1.9%) unemployed.

== Education ==
Waihi Beach Kura (Waihi Beach Primary School) is a co-educational state primary school for Year to 6 students, with a roll of 269 as of July 2026. The school opened in 1924.
