= Ōmokoroa =

Settlement in the Bay of Plenty, New Zealand

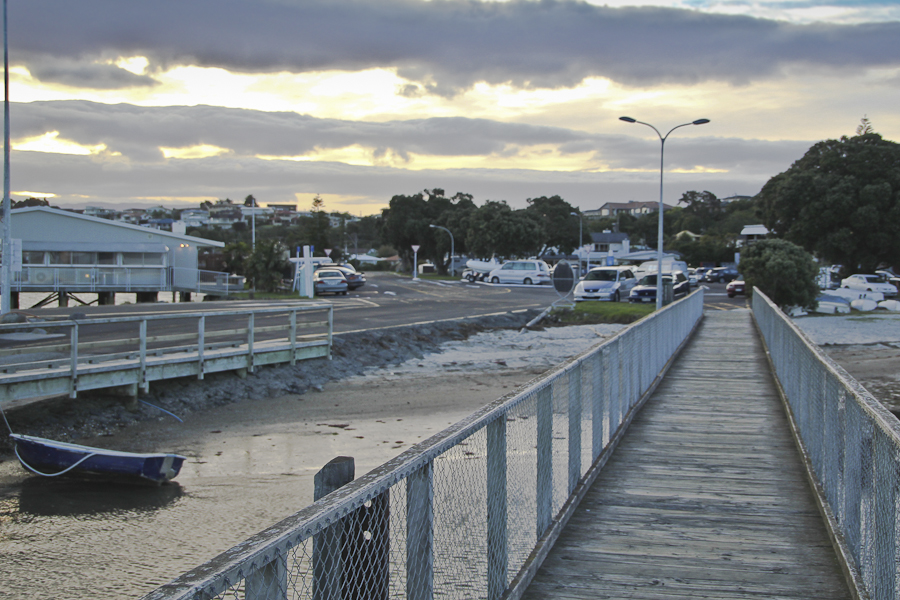
- The sun setting at the Ōmokoroa wharf
- Interactive map of Ōmokoroa
- Coordinates: 37°40′00″S 176°01′58″E
- Country: New Zealand
- Region: Bay of Plenty
- Territorial authority: Western Bay of Plenty District
- Ward: Kaimai Ward
- Community: Omokoroa Community
- Electorates: Coromandel; Waiariki (Māori)

Government
  - Territorial authority: Western Bay of Plenty District Council
  - Regional council: Bay of Plenty Regional Council
  - Mayor of Western Bay of Plenty: James Denyer
  - Coromandel MP: Scott Simpson
  - Waiariki MP: Rawiri Waititi

Area
  - Total: 5.24 km^{2} (2.02 sq mi)

Population (June 2025)
  - Total: 5,800
  - Density: 1,100/km^{2} (2,900/sq mi)

Ōmokoroa is a small urban area in the Western Bay of Plenty District of New Zealand. The suburb is considered part of Greater Tauranga (contributing towards its population of 184,000), and is within the Coromandel electorate. Ōmokoroa began as a small rural holiday village, but is expanding to be a commuter town, with a 25-minute drive to Tauranga City.

Ōmokoroa urban area had an estimated population of 5,800 as of June 2025. It is situated within the Kaimai Ward, Western Bay of Plenty. Ōmokoroa includes the urban area on the harbour side of State Highway 2, along with Youngson Road to Plummers Point Road, and parts of Old Highway Road. Part of Ōmokoroa was designated a Special Housing Area in 2016 to encourage the building of affordable homes.

The 2020 Ōmokoroa Town Centre Masterplan envisaged a population of 12,500 by 2026, although it said this might be optimistic. A 2025 estimate gives a population of 13,000 by 2050.

== Demographics ==
Stats NZ describes Ōmokoroa as a small urban area which covers 5.24 km^{2} (2.02 sq mi). It had an estimated population of 5,800 as of June 2025, with a population density of 1,107 people per km^{2}.

Historical population
Year	Pop.	±% p.a.
2006	1,968	—
2013	2,403	+2.89%
2018	3,288	+6.47%
2023	5,451	+10.64%
The 2006 population is for a smaller area of 3.77 km^{2}. Source:

Ōmokoroa had a population of 5,451 in the 2023 New Zealand census, an increase of 2,163 people (65.8%) since the 2018 census, and an increase of 3,048 people (126.8%) since the 2013 census. There were 2,583 males, 2,856 females, and 12 people of other genders in 2,154 dwellings. 2.0% of people identified as LGBTIQ+. The median age was 49.8 years (compared with 38.1 years nationally). There were 1,011 people (18.5%) aged under 15 years, 618 (11.3%) aged 15 to 29, 2,073 (38.0%) aged 30 to 64, and 1,749 (32.1%) aged 65 or older.

People could identify as more than one ethnicity. The results were 91.4% European (Pākehā); 11.6% Māori; 2.1% Pasifika; 4.9% Asian; 0.8% Middle Eastern, Latin American and African New Zealanders (MELAA); and 2.2% other, which includes people giving their ethnicity as "New Zealander". English was spoken by 97.4%, Māori by 2.0%, Samoan by 0.2%, and other languages by 10.3%. No language could be spoken by 1.9% (e.g. too young to talk). New Zealand Sign Language was known by 0.4%. The percentage of people born overseas was 28.1, compared with 28.8% nationally.

Religious affiliations were 34.2% Christian, 0.6% Hindu, 0.1% Islam, 0.3% Māori religious beliefs, 0.2% Buddhist, 0.3% New Age, 0.1% Jewish, and 1.9% other religions. People who answered that they had no religion were 55.1%, and 7.3% of people did not answer the census question.

Of those at least 15 years old, 1,056 (23.8%) people had a bachelor's or higher degree, 2,457 (55.3%) had a post-high school certificate or diploma, and 924 (20.8%) people exclusively held high school qualifications. The median income was $37,800, compared with $41,500 nationally. 564 people (12.7%) earned over $100,000 compared to 12.1% nationally. The employment status of those at least 15 was 1,761 (39.7%) full-time, 585 (13.2%) part-time, and 87 (2.0%) unemployed.

Individual statistical areas
Name	Area (km^{2})	Population	Density (per km^{2})	Dwellings	Median age	Median income
Ōmokoroa North	3.83	4,371	1,141	1,788	54.7 years	$35,500
Ōmokoroa South	1.42	1,080	1,080	363	31.7 years	$53,400
New Zealand					38.1 years	$41,500

== Communication ==
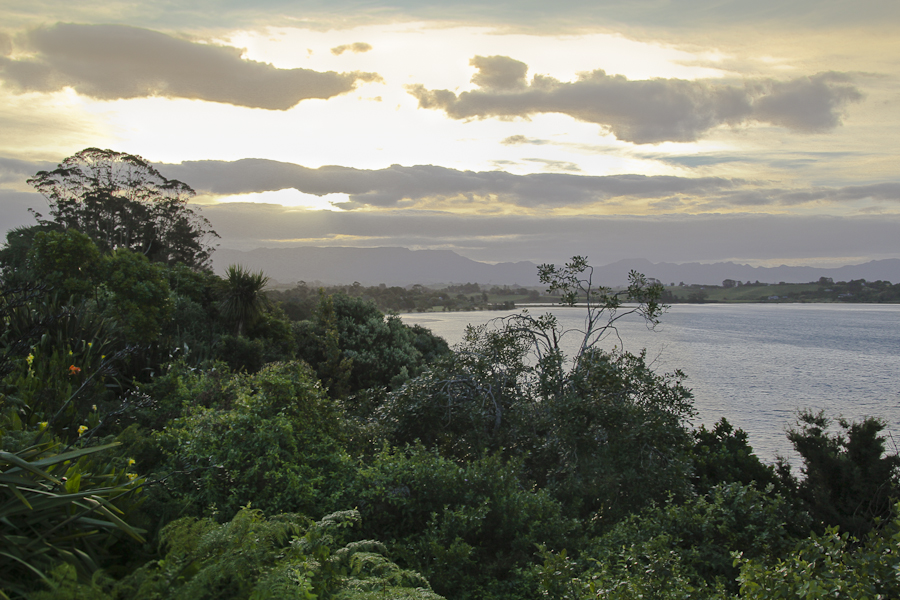
The sun setting over Ōmokoroa

=== Post ===
The postcodes for the area are:

- 3114 – Railway line to harbour edge
- 3172 – Railway line towards SH2

=== Phone ===
The dialing prefix(es) for the town are

- (+64) 7 548

=== Bus ===
Baybus runs Monday to Friday buses between Tauranga and Ōmokoroa Beach.

=== Cycleway ===
The Ōmokoroa-Tauranga cycleway is 19 km (12 mi) long. It includes local roads and a narrow footpath, as well as gravel cycle paths.

=== Ferry ===
Matakana Ferry 2000 Ltd runs a subsidised ferry 4 times a day between Ōmokoroa and Matakana Island.

=== Railways ===
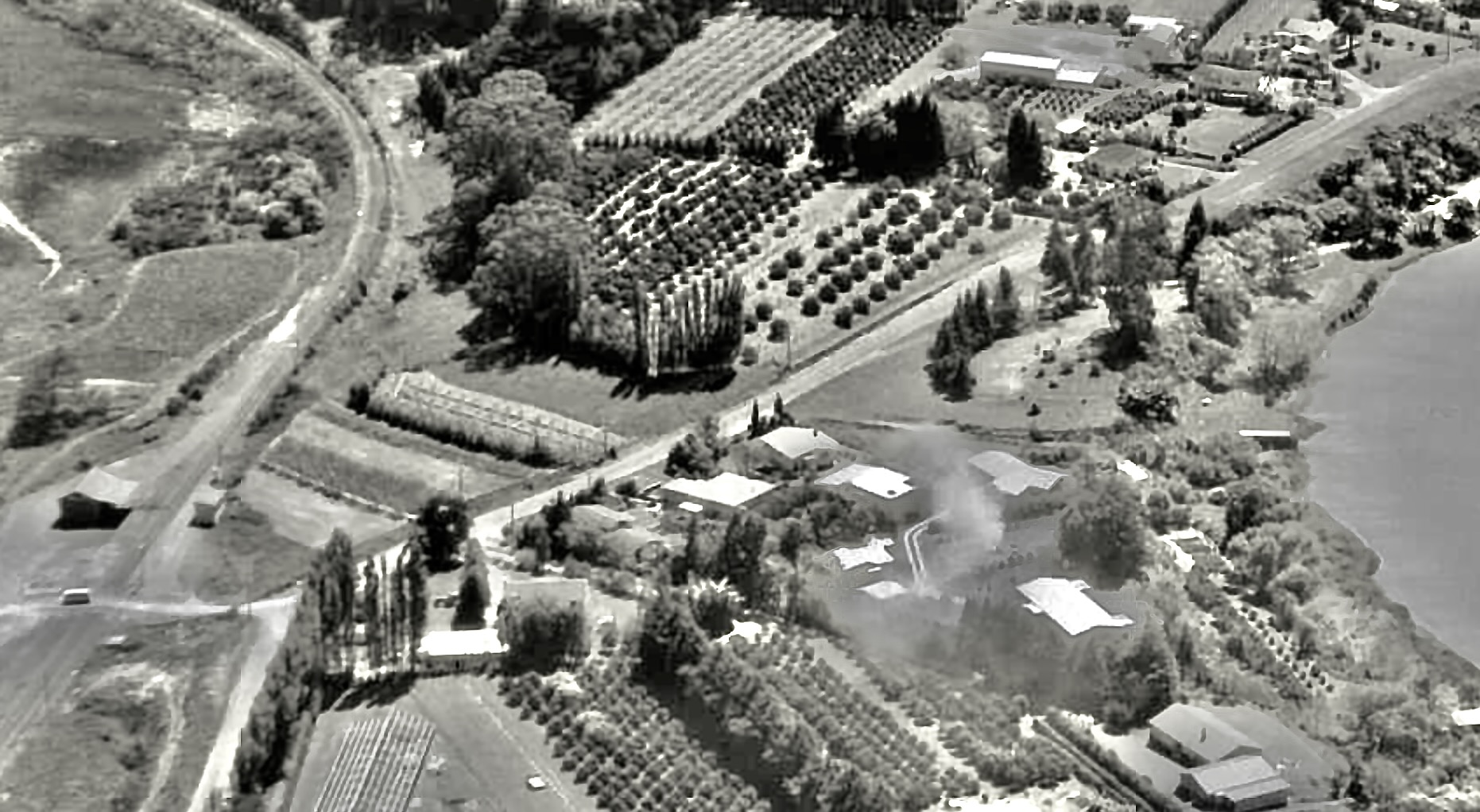
1980 Ōmokoroa railway station

==== Ōmokoroa railway station ====
Ōmokoroa had a flag station along Plummers Point Rd, from 16 October 1913, on the tramway, and, on the East Coast Main Trunk, from 28 March 1928 to 11 September 1967 (6 April 1986 for goods), though a special train ran on 29 February 1928 and goods were carried from 5 March. New Zealand Railways (NZR) took over from the Public Works Department (PWD) on 18 June 1928. The station had a shelter shed, cart approach, a 30 ft (9.1 m) by 20 ft (6.1 m) goods shed, cattle and sheep yards, a loading bank and a passing loop for 29 wagons. It also had toilets until they were closed in 1958. Fifteen wagons of an Auckland-Tāneatua goods train were derailed at Ōmokoroa on 17 January 1964.

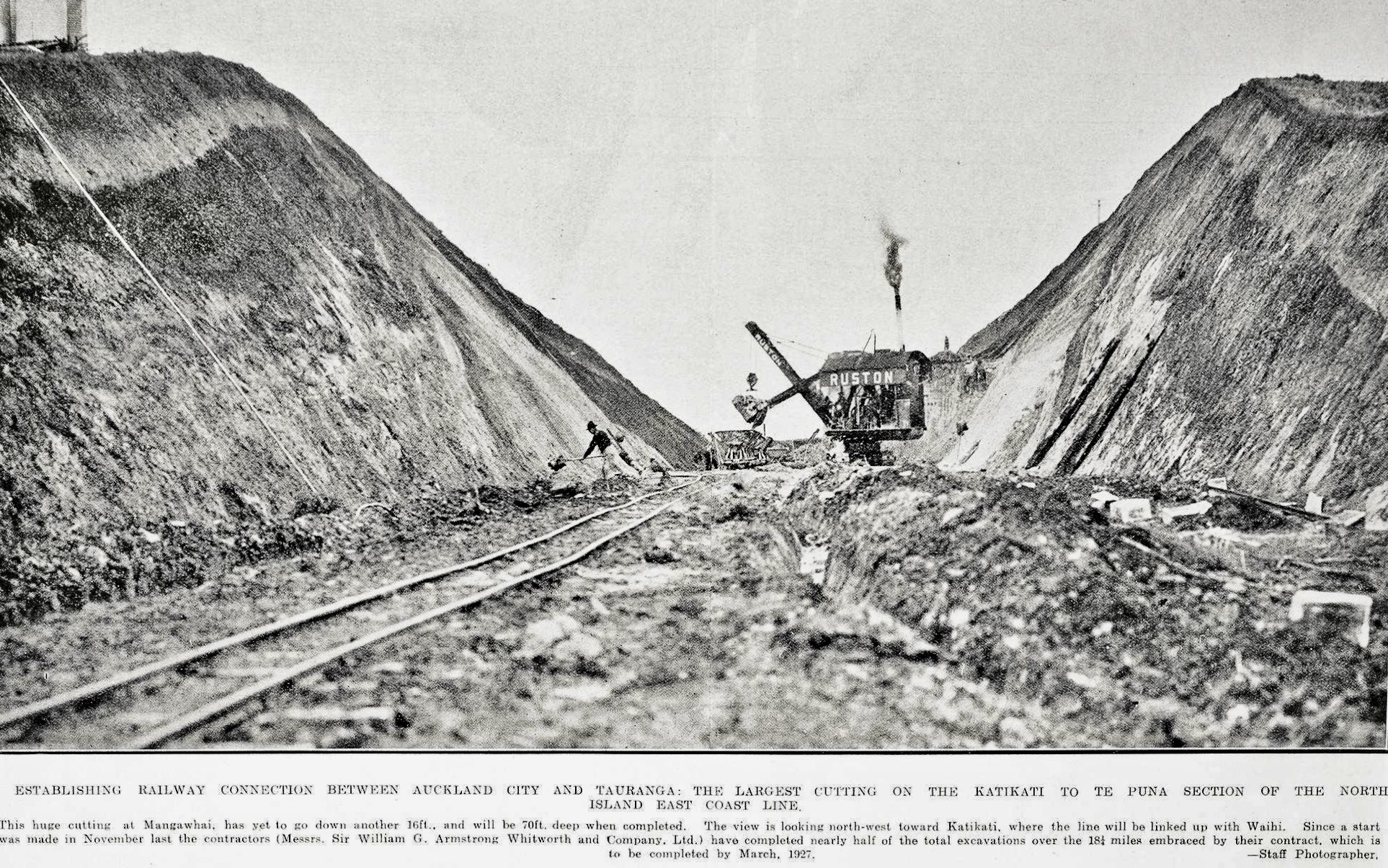
Mangawhai cutting in 1926

The station was on the 18.5 mi (29.8 km) section of the railway between Tahawai and Te Puna, built by Sir W. G. Armstrong, Whitworth & Co for about £500,000. Due to difficulties in establishing firm foundations for the line and its bridges, it was the last section of the Auckland-Tāneatua line to be completed. It was unusual at the time for contracts to be given to private companies, rather than to PWD, or worker cooperatives. The contractors built a wharf and stacking yard at Mount Maunganui, and landing-stages at several estuaries along the Harbour. They built 100 x 2-man, 13 x 4-man, 66 x 6-man huts, 46 married quarters, 3 cookhouses, 4 bathhouses, 2 recreation-rooms, quarters for field engineers and had two steam-locomotives, six steam-navvies, six petrol-locomotives, two steam pile-drivers, concrete-mixers, launches, punts, motor-lorries and ballast-trucks. Earthworks amounted to 1,229,000 yd^{3} (940,000 m^{3}).

The 19 km (12 mi) Ōmokoroa-Tauranga cycleway shares the causeways and bridges over Mangawhai Bay and bridge 59 over Te Puna River, which is 81.67m long.

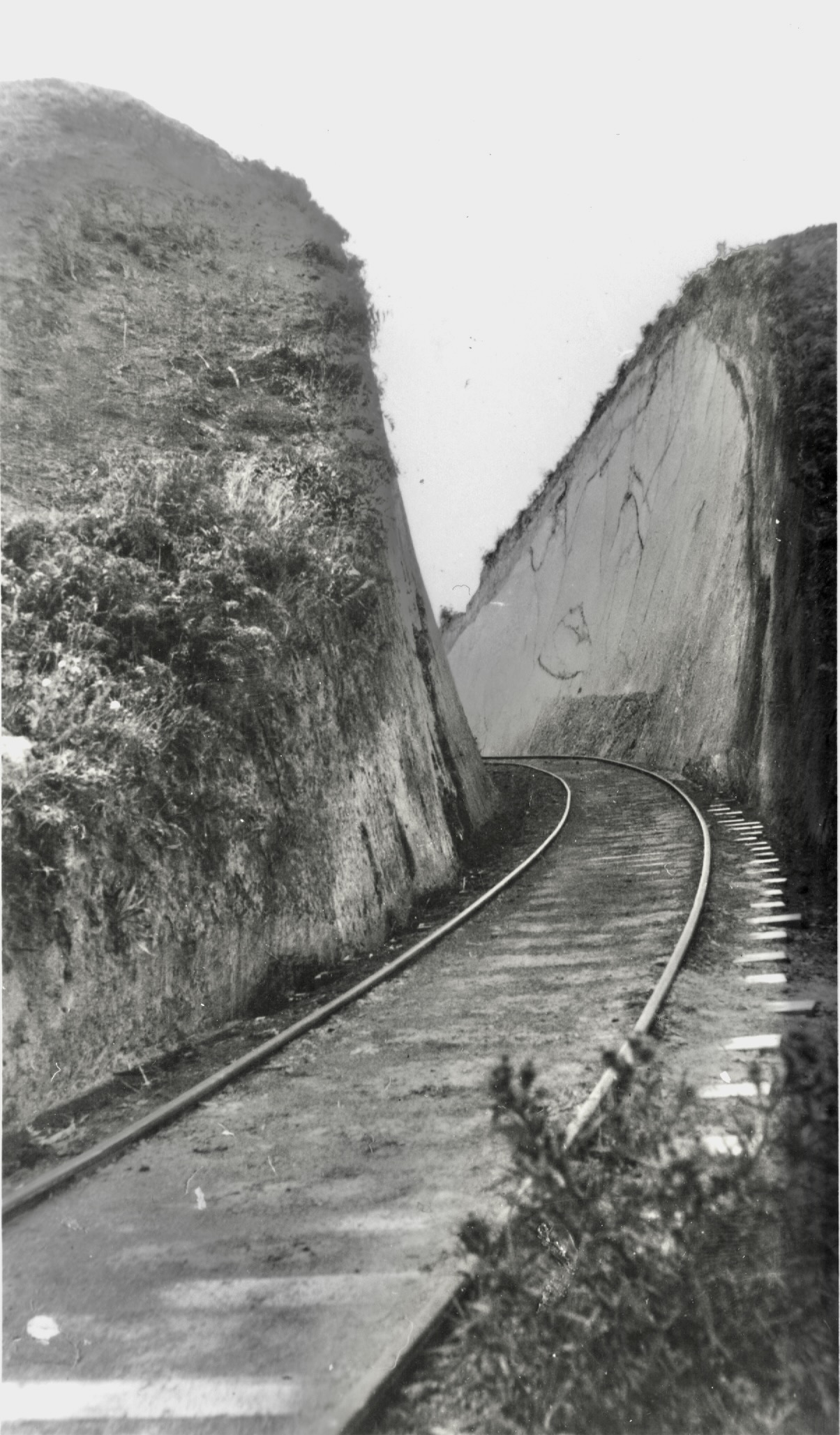
Whakamārama-Ōmokoroa tramway cutting

Preceding station	Historical railways	Following station
Pahoia; Line open, station closed 3.93 km (2.44 mi); Towards Hamilton	East Coast Main Trunk; New Zealand Railways Department	Te Puna; Line open, station closed 5.42 km (3.37 mi); Towards Tāneatua

==== Leyland O’Brien tramline ====
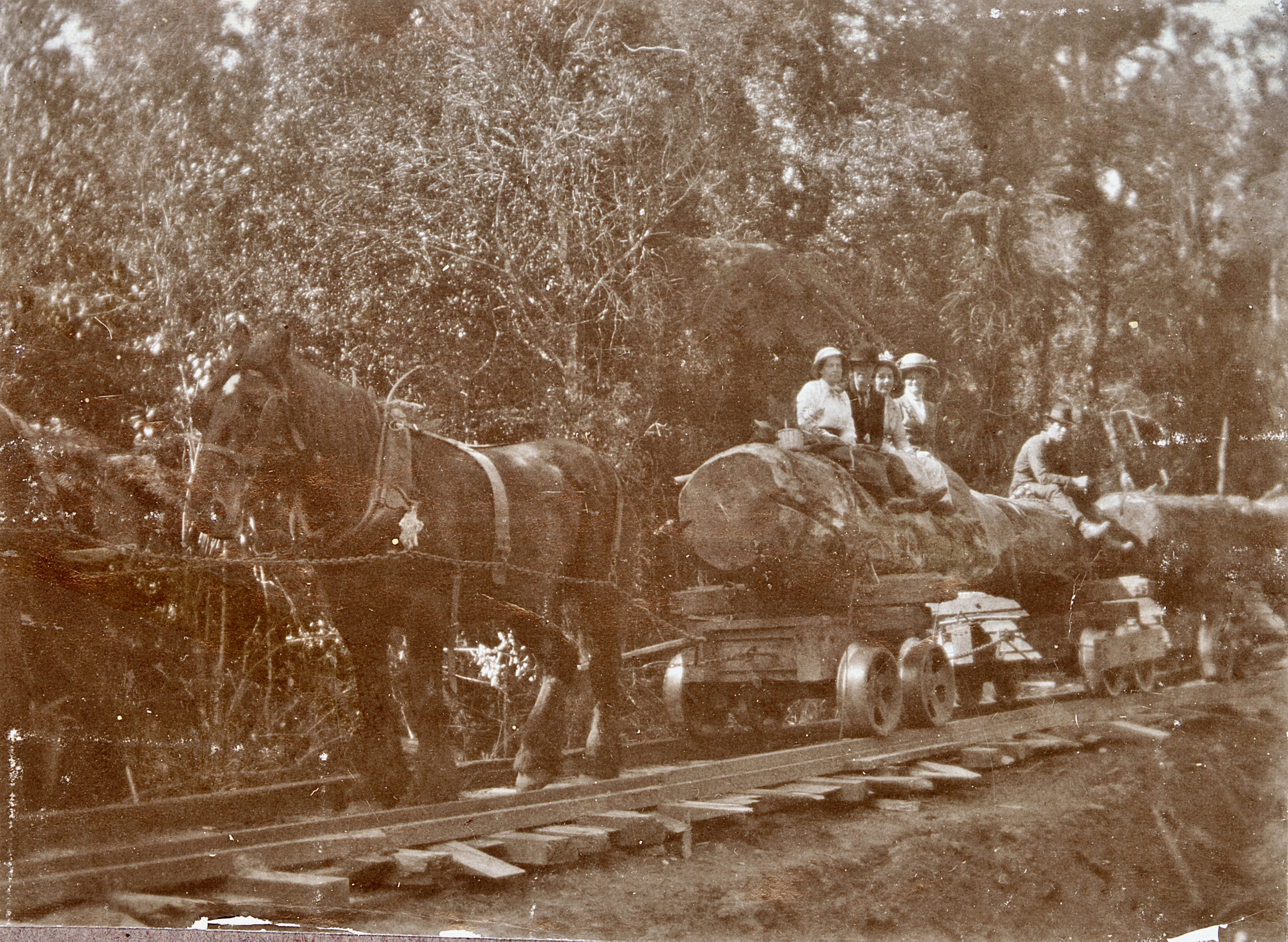
Bush tramway at Whakamārama mill

About 1913, Whakamārama Land and Timber Co built a 3ft 6in gauge tramway to serve their mill, with a phone line alongside. From May 1914 it carried timber to the wharf, to be loaded on the 90 ton scow Moa (launched on 1 November 1907 by George Turnbull Niccol) for Leyland O'Brien Timber Co, Auckland. The timber was mainly rimu, carried from what is now the Kaimai Mamaku Conservation Park for about 6 mi (9.7 km) to Whakamārama mill and about the same distance to Ōmokoroa wharf (along what is now Plummers Point Rd). The Moa was the ship captured by Felix von Luckner when he escaped from Motuihe Island / Te Motu-a-Ihenga internment camp in 1917. A fire on Moa was put out in 1921. She lasted until being stranded in the Wanganui River on 30 March 1935, where she was buried in sand and shingle. From 1919 some of the cut areas were sold for farming. In 1928 a siding was added to serve the new railway at Ōmokoroa station. The mill, which was just east of the village, was rebuilt in 1930, after a fire. At that time the tram was worked by two steam locomotives and a converted Ford tractor. Some of the rails were lifted in 1941 and no tramway equipment was mentioned in a 1947 advert selling other items from the mill, but the upper part of the tramway may have remained in use until about 1947. The rest of the track was lifted by 1969. Parts of the tramway are now a walking track from the end of Whakamārama Road.

== Education ==
Omokoroa No.1 School is a co-educational state primary school for Year 1 to 8 students, with a roll of 319 as of July 2026. It opened in 1900.

Ōmokoroa Point School is another co-educational state primary school for Year 1 to 8 students, with a roll of 327. It opened in the Omokoroa Settlers Hall in 1929 as Omokoroa No 2 School and moved to its own building as Omokoroa Point School in 1959.

The nearest zoned secondary schools in the area are Otumoetai College, Tauranga Boys' College and Tauranga Girls' College. Katikati College and the private Bethlehem College are also nearby.
