= Adela Blanche Stewart =

New Zealand homemaker and writer (1846–1910)

Adela Blanche Stewart (1846–1910) was a New Zealand homemaker and writer. She was born in Clifton, Gloucestershire (now in Bristol), England, in 1846. She and her husband Hugh Stewart emigrated to New Zealand in 1878 and settled at Athenree near Katikati. Katikati was a settlement organised by Hugh's brother George Vesey Stewart. She wrote a book entitled My Simple Life in New Zealand (1908).
