= Western Bay of Plenty District =

- Territorial authority district
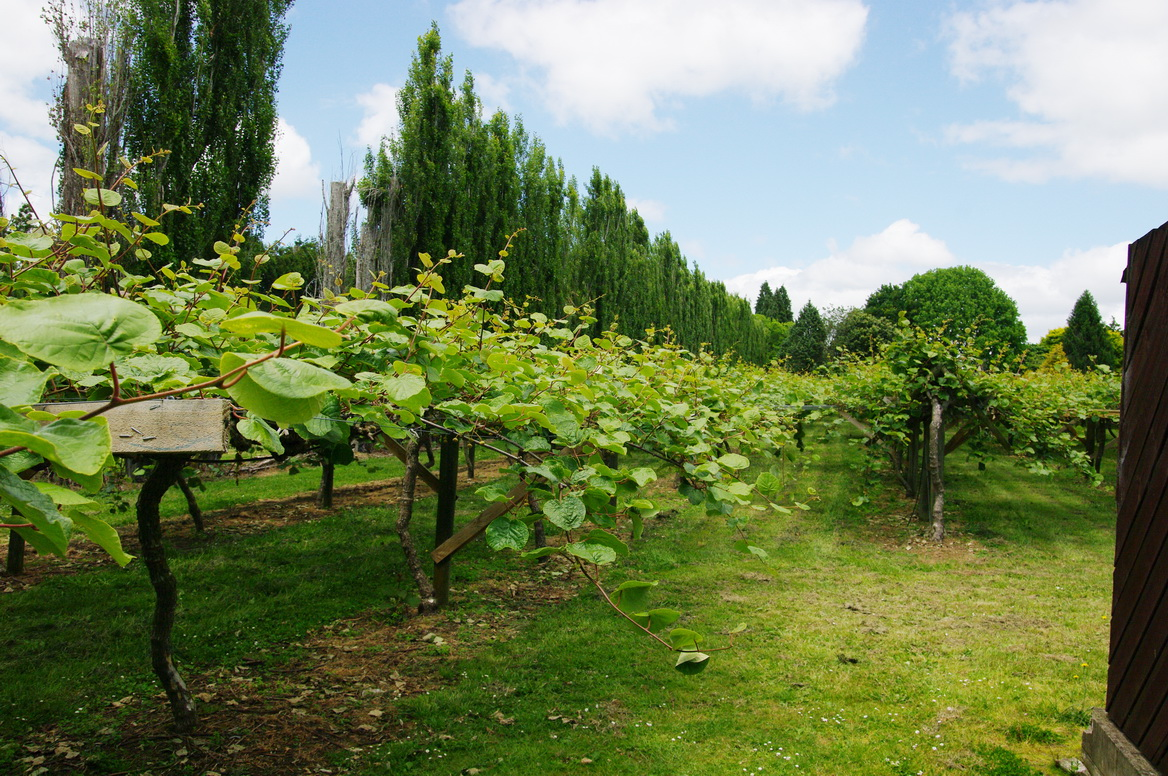
- Kiwifruit orchard at Te Puke

- Western Bay of Plenty district within the North Island
- Coordinates: 37°47′24″S 176°00′14″E
- Country: New Zealand
- Region: Bay of Plenty
- Wards: Waihi Beach-Katikati; Kaimai; Te Puke-Maketu
- Seat: Greerton, Tauranga

Government
  - Mayor: James Denyer
  - Territorial authority: Western Bay of Plenty District Council

Area
  - Land: 1,944.41 km^{2} (750.74 sq mi)

Population (June 2025)
  - Total: 60,100
  - Density: 30.9/km^{2} (80.1/sq mi)
- Time zone: UTC+12 (NZST)
  - Summer (DST): UTC+13 (NZDT)
- Postcode(s): Map of postcodes
- Website: www.westernbay.govt.nz

Western Bay of Plenty District is a territorial district within the Bay of Plenty Region of New Zealand. The district envelops Tauranga city by land, and includes Matakana Island, at the entrance to Tauranga Harbour.

== Local government ==
The seat of the Western Bay of Plenty District Council is at Greerton in Tauranga City (which is a separate area that is not part of the district). The district came into being in the local government reorganisation of 1989; with minor modifications to the boundaries, it merged the old Tauranga County and Te Puke Borough. The most significant changes were in the northwest, with Waihi Beach being transferred to the district from the old Ohinemuri County, and near Tauranga City, where some of the hinterland, formerly in the county, was transferred to the city.

=== Wards ===
For the purposes of electing district councillors, the wards within the district consist of the following:

- Waihi Beach-Katikati Ward: (seat at Katikati)
  - Waihi Beach Sub-Division
  - Katikati Sub-Division
- Kaimai Ward: (seat at Ōmokoroa)
- Te Puke-Maketu Ward: (seat at Te Puke)
  - Te Puke Sub-Division
  - Maketu Sub-Division

=== Populated places ===
Western Bay of Plenty District consists of the following towns, localities, settlements and communities:

- Waihi Beach-Katikati Ward:
  - Waihi Beach Sub-Division:
    - Athenree
    - Bowentown
    - Island View
    - Orokawa Bay
    - Pios Beach
    - Waiau
    - Waihi Beach
  - Katikati Sub-Division:
    - Aongatete
    - Apata (Note: Formerly a populated place within Kaimai Ward until 2019.)
    - Fairview
    - Katikati
    - Kauri Point
    - Matahui Point
    - Matakana
    - Matakana Point
    - Ngakautuakina Point
    - Ongare Point
    - Opureora
    - Pahoia
    - Rangiwaea
    - Rereatukahia Pa
    - Tahawai
    - Tanners Point
    - Tirohanga Point
    - Tuapiro Point
    - Wainui North
    - Woodlands
- Kaimai Ward:
  - Kaiate Falls
  - Kaitemako
  - Kopurererua
  - Lower Kaimai
  - McLaren Falls
  - Minden
  - Motuhoa
  - Ngapeke
  - Ohauiti
  - Omanawa Falls
  - Omanawa
  - Ōmokoroa Beach
  - Ōmokoroa
  - Oropi
  - Plummers Point
  - Pyes Pa (Note: Partially shared with Tauranga.)
  - Taiwhitinui Pa
  - Te Puna Beach
  - Te Puna West
  - Te Puna
  - Wairoa
  - Whakamarama
- Maketu-Te Puke Ward:
  - Te Puke Sub-Division:
    - Douglas Corner
    - Manoeka
    - Otawa
    - Papamoa
    - Te Matai
    - Te Puke
    - Wairai
    - Waitangi
  - Maketu Sub-Division:
    - Little Waihi
    - Maketu
    - Mangatai
    - Newdicks Beach
    - Ngawaro
    - Ohinepanea
    - Okurei Point
    - Otamarakau (Note: Partially shared with Whakatāne District.)
    - Paengaroa
    - Pongakawa Valley
    - Pongakawa
    - Pukehina
    - Pukehina Beach
    - Rangiuru
    - Te Ranga
    - Te Tumu

== Population ==
Western Bay of Plenty District covers 1,944.41 km^{2} (750.74 sq mi) and had an estimated population of 60,100 as of June 2025, with a population density of 31 people per km^{2}. 2,620 live in Waihi Beach, 6,030 in Katikati, and 10,400 in Te Puke.

Historical population
Year	Pop.	±% p.a.
2006	41,826	—
2013	43,323	+0.50%
2018	50,904	+3.28%
2023	56,184	+1.99%

Western Bay of Plenty District had a population of 56,184 in the 2023 New Zealand census, an increase of 5,280 people (10.4%) since the 2018 census, and an increase of 12,861 people (29.7%) since the 2013 census. There were 28,041 males, 28,008 females and 135 people of other genders in 20,238 dwellings. 2.0% of people identified as LGBTIQ+. The median age was 45.0 years (compared with 38.1 years nationally). There were 10,065 people (17.9%) aged under 15 years, 8,481 (15.1%) aged 15 to 29, 24,786 (44.1%) aged 30 to 64, and 12,852 (22.9%) aged 65 or older.

People could identify as more than one ethnicity. The results were 80.1% European (Pākehā); 21.6% Māori; 3.4% Pasifika; 7.3% Asian; 0.8% Middle Eastern, Latin American and African New Zealanders (MELAA); and 2.6% other, which includes people giving their ethnicity as "New Zealander". English was spoken by 96.5%, Māori language by 5.4%, Samoan by 0.2% and other languages by 9.7%. No language could be spoken by 1.9% (e.g. too young to talk). New Zealand Sign Language was known by 0.4%. The percentage of people born overseas was 20.2, compared with 28.8% nationally.

Religious affiliations were 28.9% Christian, 1.2% Hindu, 0.2% Islam, 2.1% Māori religious beliefs, 0.6% Buddhist, 0.5% New Age, 0.1% Jewish, and 3.6% other religions. People who answered that they had no religion were 54.8%, and 8.4% of people did not answer the census question.

Of those at least 15 years old, 6,720 (14.6%) people had a bachelor's or higher degree, 25,533 (55.4%) had a post-high school certificate or diploma, and 11,763 (25.5%) people exclusively held high school qualifications. The median income was $37,700, compared with $41,500 nationally. 4,740 people (10.3%) earned over $100,000 compared to 12.1% nationally. The employment status of those at least 15 was that 21,597 (46.8%) people were employed full-time, 7,071 (15.3%) were part-time, and 1,146 (2.5%) were unemployed.

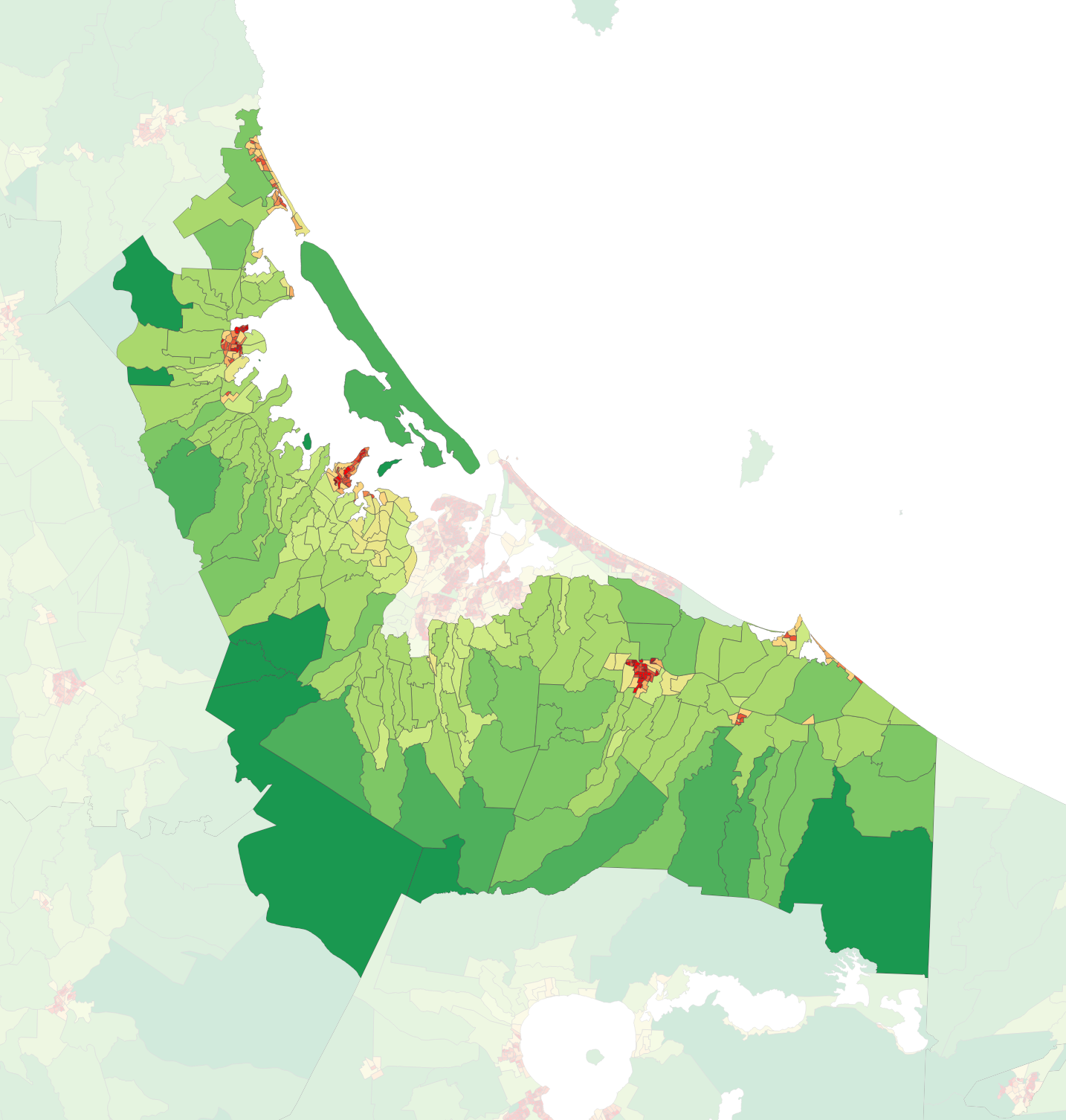
Population density in the 2023 census

Individual wards
Name	Area (km^{2})	Population	Density (per km^{2})	Dwellings	Median age	Median income
Katikati-Waihi Beach Ward	405.26	16,377	40	6,687	53.2 years	$32,000
Maketu-Te Puke Ward	816.14	19,578	24	6,366	37.5 years	$39,100
Kaimai Ward	723.01	20,226	28	7,188	46.0 years	$41,900
New Zealand					38.1 years	$41,500
