= Waiau =

Waiau could refer to several places in New Zealand:

== Settlements ==
- Waiau Pa, south of Auckland
- Waiau, Waikato, on the Coromandel Peninsula
- Waiau, Bay of Plenty, between Waihi and Waihi Beach
- Waiau, Taranaki
- Waiau, Canterbury
- Franz Josef / Waiau, on the West Coast near Franz Josef Glacier

== Geographic features ==
- Waiau Bay
- Waiau River, Hawke's Bay
- Waiau River, Canterbury
- Waiau River, Southland
- Waiho River on the West Coast, formerly known as the Waiau River

== Other New Zealand locations ==
- Waiau Branch, a Canterbury branch line railway in service from 1882 to 1978: see also Weka Pass Railway

== Elsewhere ==
- Lake Waiau on Mauna Kea in Hawaiʻi
