= Motuhoa Island =

Island in the Bay of Plenty, New Zealand

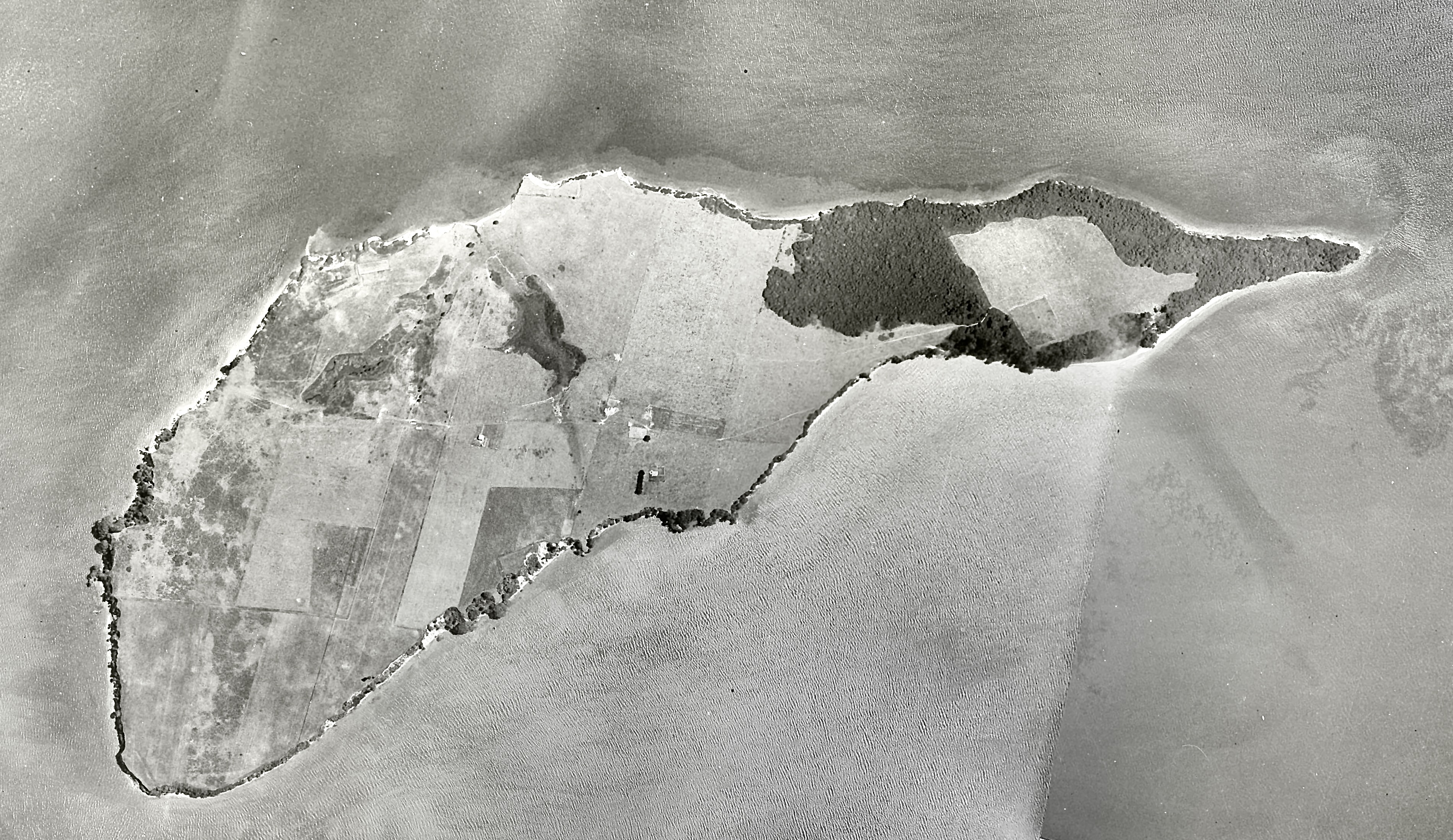
- Motuhoa Island in 1943
- Interactive map of Motuhoa Island

Geography
- Location: Bay of Plenty Region
- Coordinates: 37.6408°S 176.0689°E

Administration
- New Zealand
- Territorial authority: Western Bay of Plenty District
- Electorate: Coromandel/ Waiariki

Demographics
- Ethnic groups: Māori

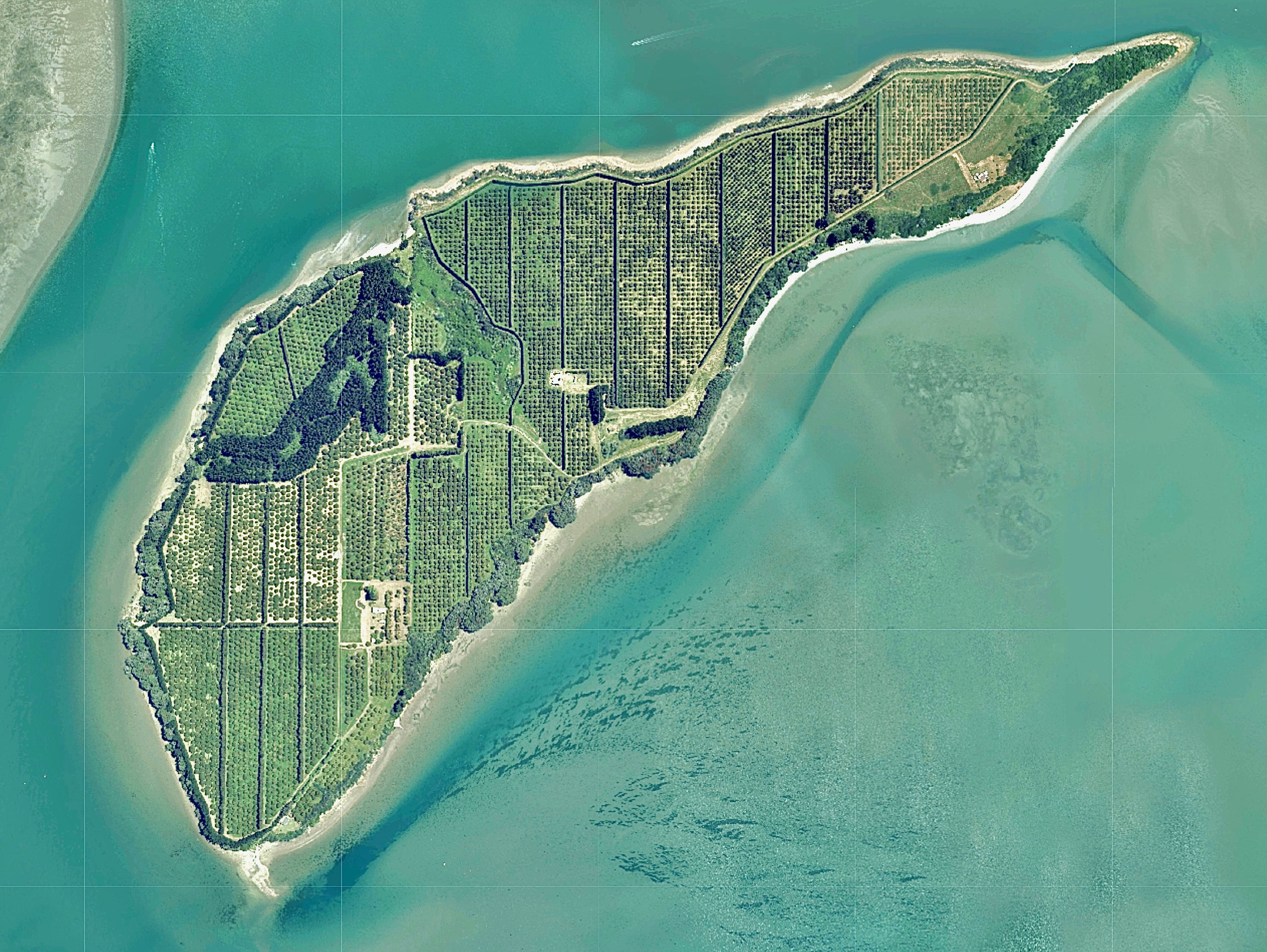
Motuhoa Island 2014-15 - avocado orchards and remnants of bush

Motuhoa Island is in the western Bay of Plenty of New Zealand's North Island, in Tauranga Harbour, over 2 km (1.2 mi) long, up to 35 m (115 ft) high and about 1.25 km (0.78 mi) southeast of Ōmokoroa, with 5 km (3.1 mi) of low cliff, which on the north is up to 8 m (26 ft) high, with almost no vegetation. A boat ramp is near the east tip of the island, on the north shore. For the 2018 census, the island had a population too small to record. Shore skinks live on the beaches.

== Geology ==
The rocks of Motuhoa Island have come out of local volcanic vents within the last 2.26 million years. The youngest rocks are Te Ranga Ignimbrite (an unconsolidated light grey, or cream, sand, with 5-25% pumice, 1-5% lithics of obsidian and rhyolite, and 7-12% crystals of plagioclase, hypersthene, ilmenite, quartz, hornblende and augite), of the Chimp Formation. They overlie, in a wavy erosional contact, Te Puna Ignimbrite, of the Pakaumanu Group, which sits unconformably on an erosional contact with Pahoia Tephras (probably part of the Kauroa Ash Formation, a sequence of very weathered, clay-rich, rhyolitic tephra), part of the Matua Subgroup of the Tauranga Group, which are exposed in coastal terraces of the island.

== History ==
Ngāti Ranginui and Ngāi Te Rangi had pā on the island. 17 archaeological sites have been recorded, including middens and urupā. Motu Hoa in 1838 was the place where Ngāti Hauā chief, Te Waharoa, was living, when he became ill. In 1840 the Catholic Bishop, Jean-Baptiste Pompallier, and priest Philippe Viard visited, a trip which was reenacted in 2016. They reported in 1841 that there was a chapel on the island.

An 1864 census found 12 of Te Pohoera hapū living on the island, when the names of places were shown as Kohomaru, Tutira, Matarangi, Matawharere and Ahimate. In 1866 the Crown paid £11,700 for the 93,188 acres (37,712 ha) Katikati–Te Puna block (within the confiscation boundary). Out of this forced purchase, Motuhoa was included as one of the native reserves. Ngāi Te Rangi were paid £7,700 for their interests in the land and allocated what was described as 6,000 acres (2,400 ha) of ‘good agricultural land’. This purchase was compulsory in that Civil Commissioner Henry Tacy Clarke said the block was required by Government, but would be paid for. In 1912 the Native Land Court divided the island's 249 acres (101 ha) between 8 owners in 3 lots of 30 acres (12 ha) and one of 156 acres (63 ha), the remaining 3 acres (1.2 ha) being a burial ground. Ngai Tuwhiwhia, of Ngāi Te Rangi, were awarded the whole island.

Tauranga Māori have a mātaitai reserve, which includes the harbour around Motuhoa Island.

Much of the island was ploughed for wheat in 1892. It was also used for oats, maize and grazing.

A pier replaced the old jetty in 1945.

== Vegetation ==
Plants growing on Motuhoa include Tetragonia tetragonoides (kōkihi, or New Zealand spinach), pōhutukawa, mamaku, karaka, cabbage tree, radiata pine, woolly nightshade, Mexican devil and brush wattle.

In 2000 about 3,600 avocado trees were planted. On reaching maturity in 2016-17 they yielded just over 3 tonnes/ha, in 2018-19 10.5 tonnes/ha and 2018-19 over 18 tonnes/ha. 1200 willow trees were planted as shelter when the orchard was established, but have since been mulched.
