= Newdicks Beach =

Beach in the North Island of New Zealand

- Beach
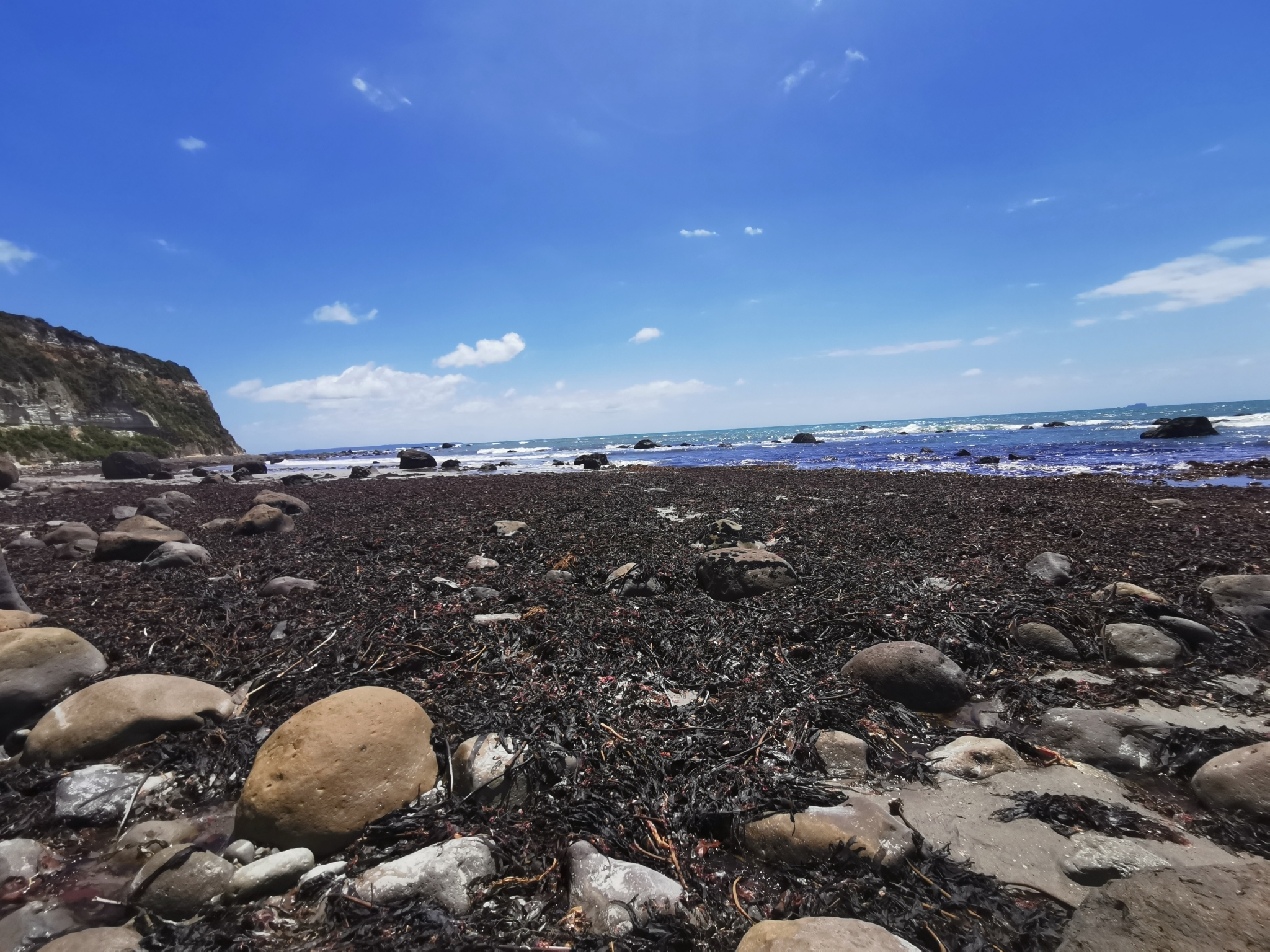
- Interactive map of Newdicks Beach
- Coordinates: 37.74733°S 176.47186°E
- Location: Western Bay of Plenty District, Bay of Plenty Region, New Zealand
- Offshore water bodies: Bay of Plenty, Pacific Ocean
- Nearby islands: Okurei Rock
- Settlements: Little Waihi

Newdicks Beach is located on the southeastern side of Okurei Point (Town point) in the Bay of Plenty in the North Island of New Zealand.

== Geography ==
The beach is approximately 2 kilometres (1.2 mi) long and is a predominantly sandy beach. The sand is predominantly quartz giving it a light coloured appearance. The occasional black patches of sand are due to the mineral titanomagnitite which comes from andesitic volcanoes.

The native ecology of the area includes New Zealand fur seals which use the area for sunbathing.

The road which leads to the beach is privately owned (initially by the Newdicks family) and payment is required to drive down the gravel road, although it can be walked for free.

The area around Newdicks Beach includes several archaeological sites relating to early Māori habitation, including Pā sites and an urupā, with the area being among the first landing sites in the region, dating to the early 1340s.
