= Katikati =

Town in the Bay of Plenty, New Zealand

- Town
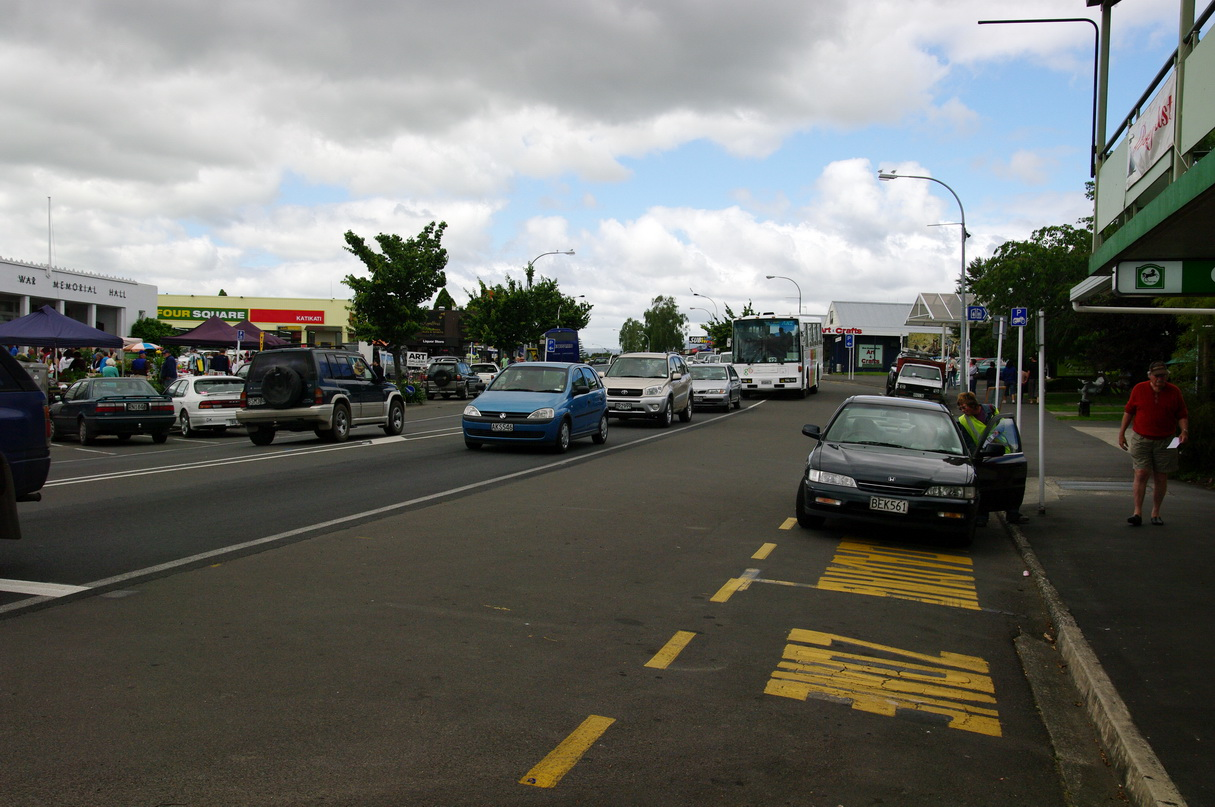
- SH2 through the centre of Katikati
- Interactive map of Katikati
- Coordinates: 37°33′S 175°55′E
- Country: New Zealand
- Region: Bay of Plenty
- Territorial authority: Western Bay of Plenty District
- Ward: Waihi Beach/Katikati
- Community: Waihi Beach Community
- Electorates: Coromandel; Waiariki (Māori)

Government
  - Territorial Authority: Western Bay of Plenty District Council
  - Regional council: Bay of Plenty Regional Council
  - Mayor of Western Bay of Plenty: James Denyer
  - Coromandel MP: Scott Simpson
  - Waiariki MP: Rawiri Waititi

Area
  - Territorial: 9.97 km^{2} (3.85 sq mi)

Population (June 2025)
  - Territorial: 6,030
  - Density: 605/km^{2} (1,570/sq mi)
- Time zone: UTC+12 (NZST)
  - Summer (DST): UTC+13 (NZDT)
- Postcode(s): 3129

Katikati is a town in New Zealand's North Island, located on the Uretara Stream near a tidal inlet towards the northern end of Tauranga Harbour, 28 kilometres south of Waihi and 40 kilometres northwest of Tauranga. State Highway 2 passes through the town. A bypass scheduled to have begun construction in 2008 was put on hold, and is no longer planned.

Katikati has become known for its many murals painted on walls of commercial buildings. These were started in the 1990s to regenerate tourist interest in the town and district, and led to the town being recognised New Zealand's 'Most Beautiful Small Town' award for towns of less than 8,000 population in 2005 by the Keep New Zealand Beautiful Society.

In 2018, Katikati was named "Avocado Capital of New Zealand. Besides its avocado orchards, there are many kiwifruit orchards around Katikati.

There are hot springs three kilometres to the south of Katikati at Sapphire Springs.

== History and culture ==
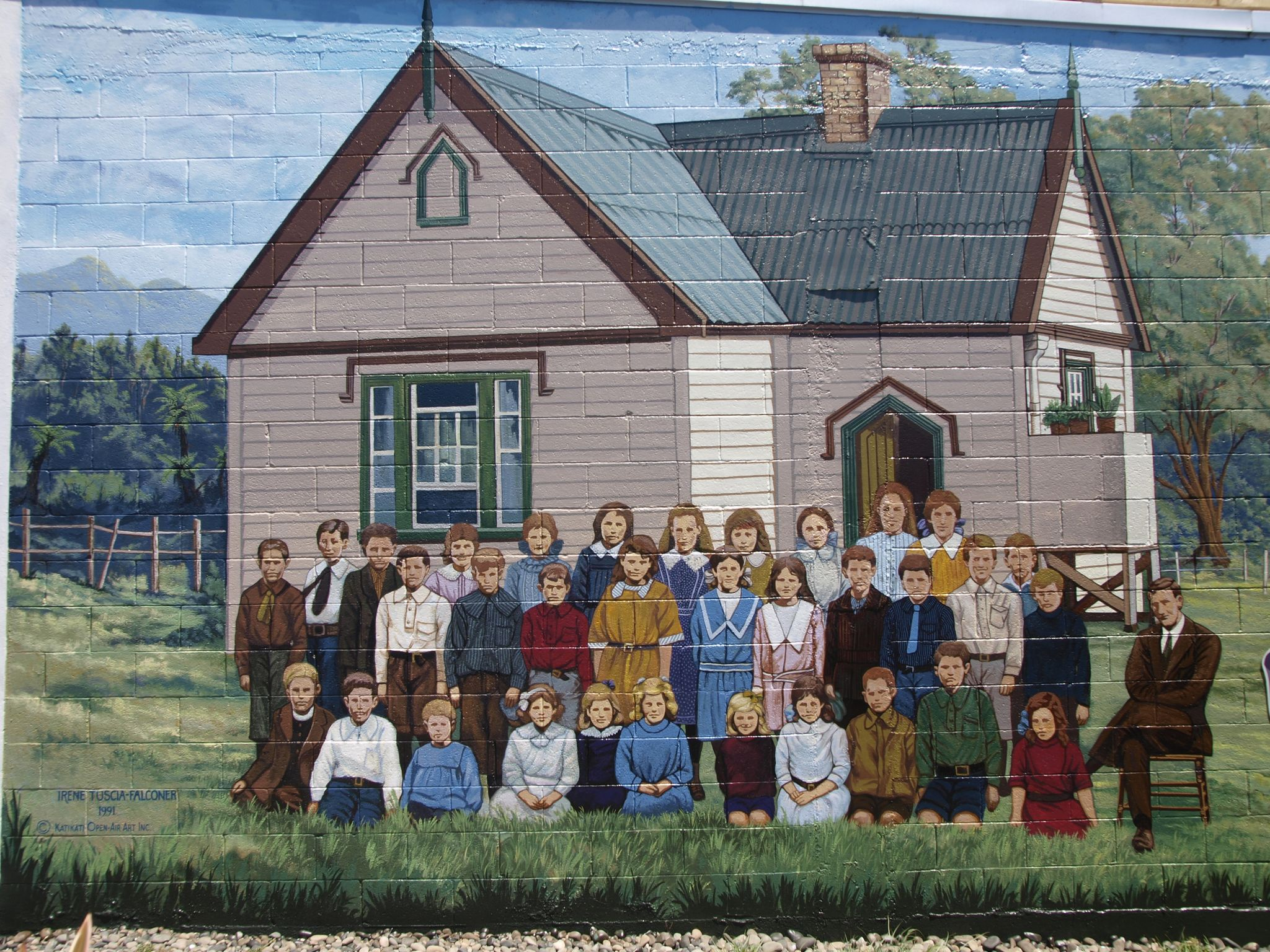
Wall Painting on Main Road at Katikati

=== Pre-European history ===
Katikati was originally a Māori community that derived from the waka Mātaatua and is affiliated with the tribal group in Tauranga, Ngāi Te Rangi. It was later settled in 1875 by Ulster Scots people from County Tyrone in Ireland through the Orange Institution.

=== European settlement ===
The land upon which the town was built was taken from local Māori after the New Zealand Wars; initially confiscated in 1864, but the area confiscated was reduced by the Tauranga Land Act 1867, and the area which is now Katikati was then bought from Māori by the Government and was given to the settlers by the Central Government. The settlement was established by the Englishman George Vesey Stewart, who led two groups of mostly Irish settlers there aboard the ships Carisbrook Castle (1875) and Lady Jocelyn (1878).

The settlement was formed from two distinct groups: "the settlers useful" (tenant farmers) and "the settlers ornamental" (those with wealth). The settlement managed to withstand early economic problems and developed into a healthy town, based around farming and agriculture. In the latter 19th century, the kauri gum digging trade became an important industry in the area. Katikati was one of the southernmost areas where the gum could be found, as it is close to the historical southern limit for where kauri trees could thrive.

=== Marae ===
There are two marae in the Katikati area.

Te Rere a Tukahia Marae and its Tamawhariua meeting house are affiliated with the Ngāi Te Rangi hapū of Ngāi Tamawhariua.

Tuapiro Marae and its Ngā Kurī a Wharei meeting house are affiliated with the Ngāti Ranginui hapū of Ngāti Te Wai.

== Transport ==
Katikati is situated on State Highway 2. There are proposals to bypass Katikati with an upgrade including two roundabouts.

Katikati was previously on the East Coast Main Trunk railway line. The railway closed in September 1978 when the Kaimai Tunnel opened. The railway from Apata through to Paeroa remained in place until 1980. There were proposals to keep the section of railway from Apata to Katikati before it was dismantled.

== Demographics ==
Stats NZ describes Katikati as a small urban area, which covers 9.97 km^{2} (3.85 sq mi). It had an estimated population of 6,030 as of June 2025, with a population density of 605 people per km^{2}.

Historical population
Year	Pop.	±% p.a.
2006	3,624	—
2013	4,167	+2.01%
2018	5,136	+4.27%
2023	5,580	+1.67%
The 2006 population is for a smaller area of 9.53 km^{2}. Source:

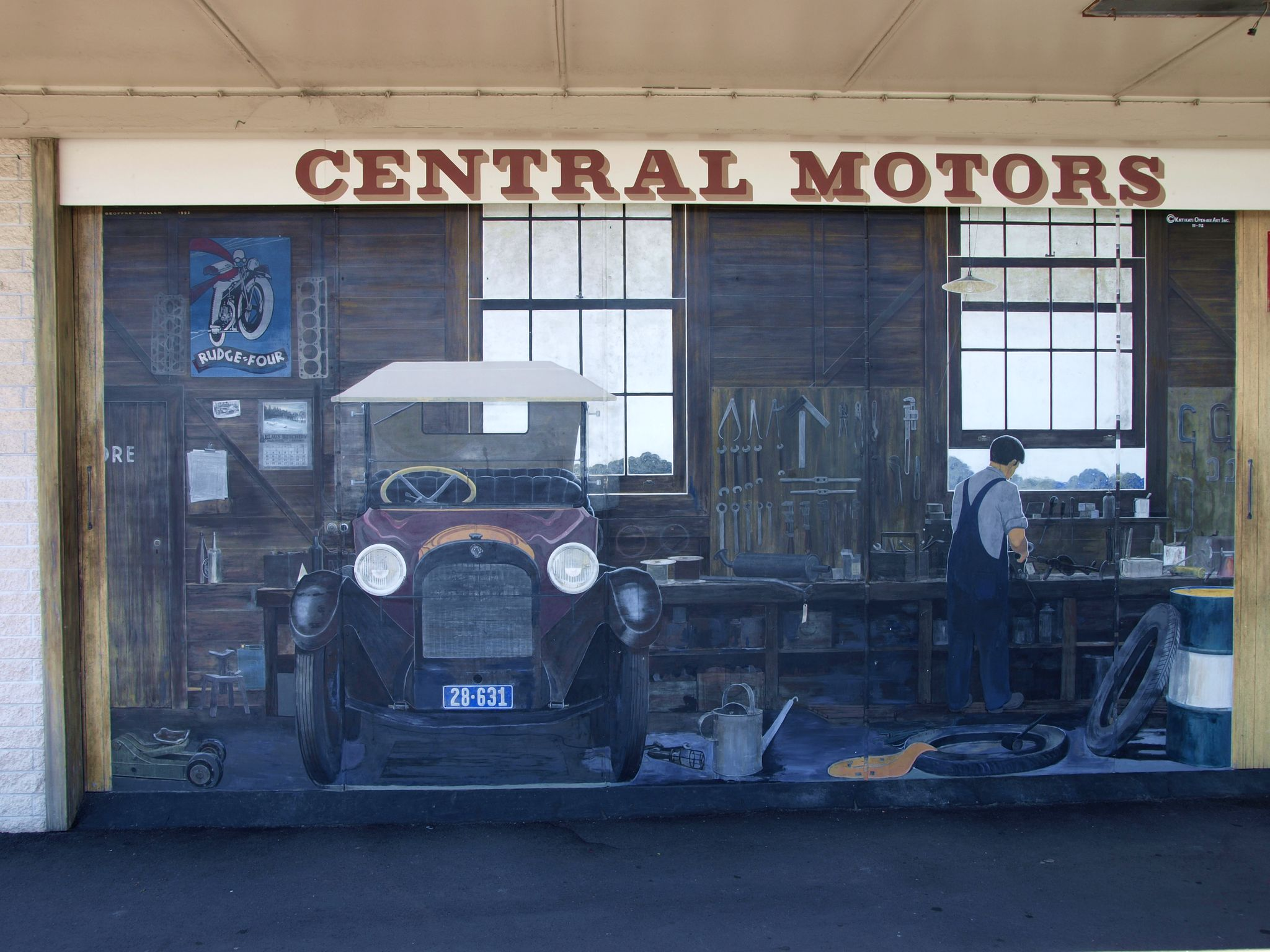
Wall Painting on Main Road at Katikati

Katikati had a population of 5,580 in the 2023 New Zealand census, an increase of 444 people (8.6%) since the 2018 census, and an increase of 1,413 people (33.9%) since the 2013 census. There were 2,643 males, 2,919 females, and 21 people of other genders in 2,334 dwellings. 2.4% of people identified as LGBTIQ+. The median age was 51.0 years (compared with 38.1 years nationally). There were 885 people (15.9%) aged under 15 years, 756 (13.5%) aged 15 to 29, 1,926 (34.5%) aged 30 to 64, and 2,016 (36.1%) aged 65 or older.

People could identify as more than one ethnicity. The results were 76.8% European (Pākehā); 16.8% Māori; 5.5% Pasifika; 12.3% Asian; 0.5% Middle Eastern, Latin American and African New Zealanders (MELAA); and 1.4% other, which includes people giving their ethnicity as "New Zealander". English was spoken by 95.9%, Māori by 3.6%, Samoan by 0.3%, and other languages by 12.8%. No language could be spoken by 1.9% (e.g. too young to talk). New Zealand Sign Language was known by 0.5%. The percentage of people born overseas was 26.5, compared with 28.8% nationally.

Religious affiliations were 29.9% Christian, 3.7% Hindu, 0.4% Islam, 1.1% Māori religious beliefs, 1.0% Buddhist, 0.5% New Age, 0.1% Jewish, and 4.7% other religions. People who answered that they had no religion were 49.1%, and 9.6% of people did not answer the census question.

Of those at least 15 years old, 681 (14.5%) people had a bachelor's or higher degree, 2,409 (51.3%) had a post-high school certificate or diploma, and 1,608 (34.2%) people exclusively held high school qualifications. The median income was $28,700, compared with $41,500 nationally. 174 people (3.7%) earned over $100,000 compared to 12.1% nationally. The employment status of those at least 15 was 1,578 (33.6%) full-time, 558 (11.9%) part-time, and 120 (2.6%) unemployed.

Individual statistical areas
Name	Area (km^{2})	Population	Density (per km^{2})	Dwellings	Median age	Median income
Katikati North	5.36	2,703	504	1,170	55.9 years	$28,500
Katikati South	4.61	2,877	624	1,164	46.0 years	$28,900
New Zealand					38.1 years	$41,500

== Education ==
Katikati Primary School is a co-educational state primary school for Year 1 to 6 students, with a roll of 527 as of July 2026.

Katikati College is a co-educational state intermediate and high school for Year 7 to 13 students, with a roll of 839.

Three schools were established in Katikati in the late 1870s. No. 2 school was renamed Katikati Central School in 1892, and the three schools merged by 1931. The name changed to Katikati District High School in 1935 with the addition of secondary education. A new High School was built on the opposite side of the road in the early 1950s.

== Notable people ==
- Alan Edward Mulgan, journalist, writer, and broadcaster
- Bunny Walters, singer
- Richard O'Brien, actor, director, and producer
- Dave Gallaher, rugby player

== Climate ==
Climate data for Katikati (1991–2020 normals, extremes 1980–2004)
Month	Jan	Feb	Mar	Apr	May	Jun	Jul	Aug	Sep	Oct	Nov	Dec	Year
Record high °C (°F)	31.0 (87.8)	31.4 (88.5)	29.1 (84.4)	25.5 (77.9)	23.5 (74.3)	21.8 (71.2)	20.4 (68.7)	21.3 (70.3)	22.5 (72.5)	24.4 (75.9)	26.0 (78.8)	28.4 (83.1)	31.4 (88.5)
Mean daily maximum °C (°F)	24.1 (75.4)	24.3 (75.7)	23.0 (73.4)	20.2 (68.4)	17.7 (63.9)	15.4 (59.7)	14.7 (58.5)	15.3 (59.5)	17.0 (62.6)	18.6 (65.5)	20.4 (68.7)	22.6 (72.7)	19.4 (67.0)
Daily mean °C (°F)	19.0 (66.2)	19.4 (66.9)	17.7 (63.9)	15.2 (59.4)	13.1 (55.6)	10.8 (51.4)	10.1 (50.2)	10.7 (51.3)	12.4 (54.3)	13.9 (57.0)	15.7 (60.3)	17.9 (64.2)	14.7 (58.4)
Mean daily minimum °C (°F)	14.0 (57.2)	14.5 (58.1)	12.5 (54.5)	10.2 (50.4)	8.5 (47.3)	6.3 (43.3)	5.4 (41.7)	6.1 (43.0)	7.8 (46.0)	9.3 (48.7)	10.9 (51.6)	13.1 (55.6)	9.9 (49.8)
Record low °C (°F)	4.8 (40.6)	5.0 (41.0)	2.3 (36.1)	0.0 (32.0)	−0.6 (30.9)	−2.8 (27.0)	−3.2 (26.2)	−2.5 (27.5)	−1.2 (29.8)	−0.8 (30.6)	1.0 (33.8)	2.5 (36.5)	−3.2 (26.2)
Average rainfall mm (inches)	76.7 (3.02)	125.3 (4.93)	86.0 (3.39)	144.1 (5.67)	102.3 (4.03)	114.9 (4.52)	153.4 (6.04)	106.3 (4.19)	109.3 (4.30)	95.5 (3.76)	107.0 (4.21)	103.8 (4.09)	1,324.6 (52.15)
Source: NIWA
