= Western Bay of Plenty District Council =

Coordinates: 37.6976189°S 175.6439658°E

Western Bay of Plenty District Council Te Kaunihera a rohe mai i Ngā Kuri-a-Whārei ki Otamarakau ki te Uru
- Brand logo

Type
- Type: Territorial authority of Western Bay of Plenty District
- Term limits: None

History
- Established: 1 November 1989; 36 years ago
- Preceded by: Tauranga County Council; Ohinemuri County Council; Te Puke Borough Council; Matamata County Council
- New session started: 17 October 2025

Leadership
- Mayor: James Denyer, Ind. since 15 October 2022
- Deputy: Margaret Murray-Benge, Ind. since 23 October 2025
- CEO: Matthew Potton since 11 May 2026

Structure
- Seats: 10 (including mayor)
- Political groups: Independent (10)
- Length of term: 3 years

Elections
- Voting system: First-past-the-post
- First election: 14 October 1989
- Last election: 11 October 2025
- Next election: 14 October 2028

Meeting place
- Barkes Corner Office, Greerton

Website
- westernbay.govt.nz

Western Bay of Plenty District Council (abbr. WBOPDC; Māori: Te Kaunihera a rohe mai i Ngā Kuri-a-Whārei ki Otamarakau ki te Uru) is the territorial authority for the Western Bay of Plenty District of New Zealand. It serves as the district's local government alongside the Bay of Plenty Regional Council as the regional council. The current entity has existed since 1989, prior to which local government in the area was split between four local authorities.

The governing body of the council has 9 councillors and is chaired by the mayor of Western Bay of Plenty (currently James Denyer since October 2022).

== History ==
=== Withdrawal from Local Government New Zealand ===
In mid-March 2025, the Western Bay of Plenty District Council voted to leave Local Government New Zealand (LGNZ), the national advocacy body for local and regional governments in New Zealand, by a margin of six to five. Councillor Tracey Coxhead justified the decision by claiming that LGNZ lacked professionalism and was pursuing an agenda on climate change while Councillor Margaret Murray-Beng claimed the LGNZ had "swung left" and no longer represented councilors' beliefs.

== Governing body ==
=== Mayor ===
One mayor is elected at-large; they chair meetings of the governing body and act as the head of local government in the district.

=== Current composition ===
The current members of the governing body of council are:

Role	Name	Affiliation	Ward
Mayor	James Denyer	Independent	Elected at-large
Deputy	Margaret Murray-Benge	Independent	Kaimai general
Councillor	Tracey Coxhead	Independent	Kaimai general
Councillor	Graeme Elvin	Independent	Kaimai general
Councillor	Allan Sole	Independent	Katikati-Waihī Beach general
Councillor	Rodney Joyce	Independent	Katikati-Waihī Beach general
Councillor	Shane Beech	Independent	Maketu-Te Puke general
Councillor	Grant Dally	Independent	Maketu-Te Puke general
Councillor	Laura Rae	Independent	Maketu-Te Puke general
Councillor	Darlene Dinsdale	Independent	Waka Kai Uru Māori
