= Mayor of Western Bay of Plenty =

Head of New Zealand's Western Bay of Plenty District

- Incumbent; James Denyer since 2022
- Style: His/Her Worship
- Term length: Three years, renewable
- Inaugural holder: Michael Parke-Pittar
- Formation: 1989
- Deputy: Margaret Murray-Benge
- Salary: $145,667
- Website: Official website

The mayor of Western Bay of Plenty officiates over the Western Bay of Plenty District Council.

James Denyer is the current mayor of Western Bay of Plenty. He was elected in 2022.

== List of mayors ==
There have been seven mayors of the Western Bay of Plenty.

	Name	Portrait	Term of office
1	Michael Parke-Pittar		1989–1992
2	Joan Kehely		1992–1996
3	Maureen Anderson		1996–2001
4	Graeme Weld		2001–2008
—	Ross Paterson		2008–2009 (acting)
5	Ross Paterson		2009–2016
6	Garry Webber		2016–2022
7	James Denyer		2022–present
