= Bay of Plenty Regional Council =

Regional authority of New Zealand

Bay of Plenty Regional Council Toi Moana
- Regional councils of New Zealand

Type
- Type: Unicameral
- Established: 6 March 1989, 37 years ago

Leadership
- Chair: Matemoana McDonald, Independent; October 2025
- Deputy: Glenn Dougal, Independent; October 2025
- CEO: Fiona McTavish

Structure
- Seats: 14 seats
- Political groups: Independent (14)

Elections
- Voting system: First-past-the-post
- Last election: 11 October 2025
- Next election: 2028

Meeting place
- 5 Quay St, Whakatane

Website
- boprc.govt.nz

Bay of Plenty Regional Council (Māori: Toi Moana) is the administrative body responsible for overseeing regional land use, environmental management and civil defence in the Bay of Plenty Region of New Zealand's North Island.

It was founded as part of the 1989 New Zealand local government reforms. Whakatāne was selected as the seat for the council, as a compromise between the two dominant cities of Tauranga and Rotorua. The council adopted the Māori version of its name, Toi Moana, in 2014.

== Regional parks ==
The council owns and manages two regional parks.

- Onekawa Te Mawhai Regional Park
- Papamoa Hills Regional Park

== List of chairpersons ==
- 2013: Doug Leader; deputy Jane Nees (since 2010)
- October 2025: Matemoana McDonald; deputy Glenn Dougal

== Councillors ==
Councillor	Affiliation	Constituency	Position
Matemoana McDonald	Independent	Mauao Māori	Chair
Glenn Dougal	Independent	Tauranga general	Deputy Chair
Mawera Karetai	Independent	Kōhi Māori	Councillor
Iwi Te Whau	Independent	Ōkurei Māori	Councillor
Stuart Crosby	Independent	Tauranga general	Councillor
Kate Graeme	Independent	Tauranga general	Councillor
Kat Macmillan	Independent	Tauranga general	Councillor
Tim Maltby	Independent	Tauranga general	Councillor
Sarah McCorkindale	Independent	Eastern Bay of Plenty general	Councillor
Victor Luca (Note: Luca, a former mayor of Whakatāne, was elected in a by-election on 25 September 2026 following the death of councillor Malcolm Campbell on 21 May 2026.)	Independent	Eastern Bay of Plenty general	Councillor
Anna Grayling	Independent	Rotorua general	Councillor
Raj Kumar	Independent	Rotorua general	Councillor
John Scrimgeour	Independent	Western Bay of Plenty general	Councillor
Ken Shirley	Independent	Western Bay of Plenty general	Councillor

== Elections ==
  - 1989
  - 1992
  - 1995
  - 1998
  - 2001
  - 2004
  - 2007
  - 2010
  - 2013
  - 2016
  - 2019
  - 2022
  - 2025
