= Ongare Point =

Rural settlement in the Bay of Plenty, New Zealand

- Rural settlement
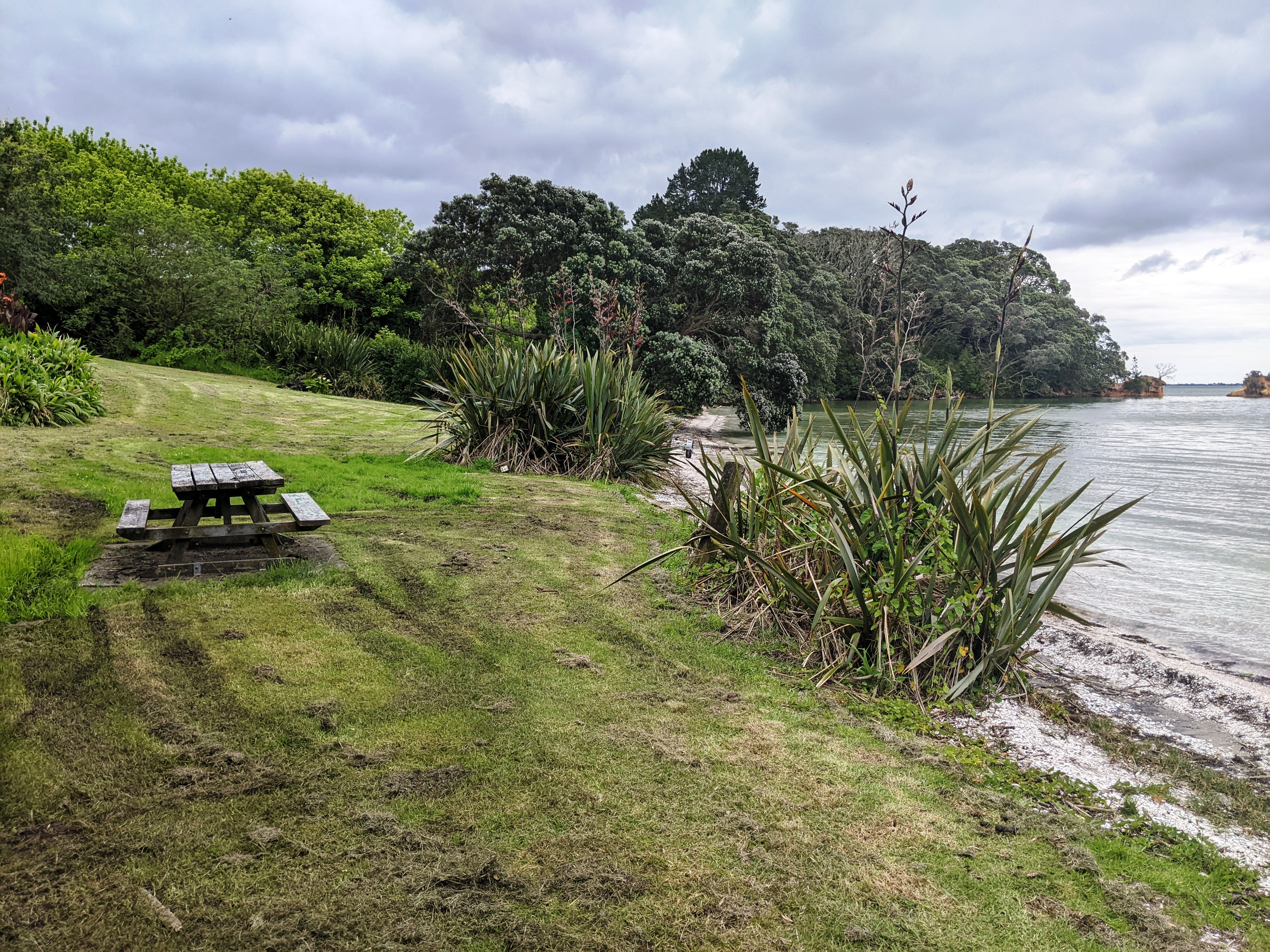
- Ongare Point beach on Tauranga Harbour
- Interactive map of Ongare Point
- Coordinates: 37.502°S 175.967°E
- Country: New Zealand
- Region: Bay of Plenty
- Territorial authority: Western Bay of Plenty District
- Ward: Katikati-Waihi Beach Ward
- Community: Katikati Community
- Electorates: Coromandel; Waiariki (Māori)

Government
  - Territorial Authority: Western Bay of Plenty District Council
  - Regional council: Bay of Plenty Regional Council
  - Mayor of Western Bay of Plenty: James Denyer
  - Coromandel MP: Scott Simpson
  - Waiariki MP: Rawiri Waititi

Area
  - Total: 0.55 km^{2} (0.21 sq mi)

Population (2023 Census)
  - Total: 105
  - Density: 190/km^{2} (490/sq mi)
- Postcode(s): 3170

Ongare Point is a rural settlement in the Western Bay of Plenty District and Bay of Plenty Region of New Zealand's North Island. It is on a headland on the eastern side of Tauranga Harbour, southeast of Katikati Entrance and opposite Matakana Island.

A coastal walkway through a reserve connects Ongare Point to Kauri Point. There is a small sandy beach.

Ngāi Te Rangi's Ōngare Pā was attacked in 1842 by a war party of 50 men led by Tāraia Ngākuti Te Tumuhuia. The local chief Te Whanake and several followers were killed.

== Demographics ==
Ōngare Point-Kauri Point is described by Statistics New Zealand as a rural settlement. Ongare Point covers 0.55 km^{2} (0.21 sq mi). It is part of the larger Tahawai statistical area.

Historical population
Year	Pop.	±% p.a.
2006	102	—
2013	102	+0.00%
2018	117	+2.78%
2023	105	−2.14%

Ongare Point had a population of 105 in the 2023 New Zealand census, a decrease of 12 people (−10.3%) since the 2018 census, and an increase of 3 people (2.9%) since the 2013 census. There were 54 males and 51 females in 51 dwellings. 2.9% of people identified as LGBTIQ+. The median age was 60.3 years (compared with 38.1 years nationally). There were 6 people (5.7%) aged under 15 years, 6 (5.7%) aged 15 to 29, 48 (45.7%) aged 30 to 64, and 42 (40.0%) aged 65 or older.

People could identify as more than one ethnicity. The results were 97.1% European (Pākehā), 11.4% Māori, and 5.7% other, which includes people giving their ethnicity as "New Zealander". English was spoken by 97.1%, and other languages by 5.7%. The percentage of people born overseas was 17.1, compared with 28.8% nationally.

The sole religious affiliation given was 31.4% Christian. People who answered that they had no religion were 54.3%, and 11.4% of people did not answer the census question.

Of those at least 15 years old, 21 (21.2%) people had a bachelor's or higher degree, 66 (66.7%) had a post-high school certificate or diploma, and 18 (18.2%) people exclusively held high school qualifications. The median income was $33,800, compared with $41,500 nationally. 6 people (6.1%) earned over $100,000 compared to 12.1% nationally. The employment status of those at least 15 was 42 (42.4%) full-time, 9 (9.1%) part-time, and 3 (3.0%) unemployed.
