= Tāraia Ngākuti Te Tumuhuia =

New Zealand Māori tribal leader (died 1872)

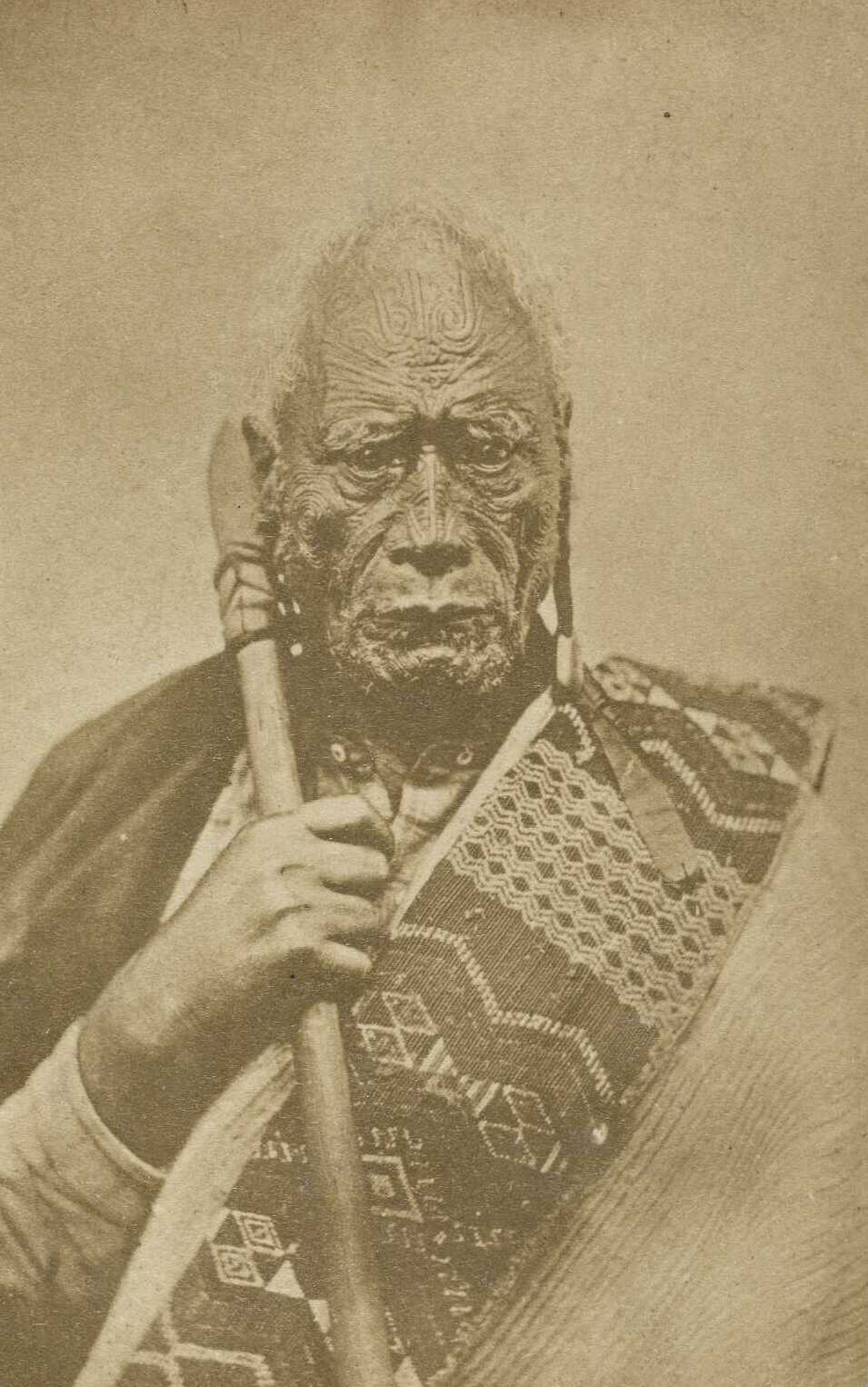
Photograph of Tāraia Ngākuti Te Tumuhuia, with moko tattoos and taiaha staff, c. 1870.

Tāraia Ngākuti Te Tumuhuia (also known as Taraia Ngakuti; died 13 March 1872) (Note: Tumuhuia should not be confused with another Māori of the same name who was shot dead in September 1863, who lived at Ngāruawāhia in the Waikato area, was youngest brother of the great Waikato chief Pōtatau, and a follower of Pai Mārire ("Hauhau") spiritual Christian movement.) was a notable New Zealand Māori warrior and tribal leader of the Ngāti Maru and the Ngāti Tamaterā iwi, in power from the 1820s. He may have been as old as almost one century.

Refusing Christianity or to adopt a European lifestyle, it is reported Tumuhuia was also part of the last cannibal feast in 1842. (His cannibalism was well-known, with one likely tall tale indicating in his hey-day, he liked a favourite breakfast of a "nice fat child, giving preference to the female sex".)

== Warrior chief ==
It was suggested the family tree was a long lineage of chiefs and warriors, to one who arrived by the Tainui canoe. Tumuhuia's father was Kaharunga, and mother, Rewa. It was given that the Māori of Tauranga had eaten his mother which led to his long-standing grievance towards that group.

A strong warrior "of dreadful reputation", he had fought alongside Rauparaha and other chiefs against groups as far as Kaiapoi and Akaroa on the South Isle, and despite the presence of Europeans and their laws, he was of the kai-tangata breed – where eating the enemy destroyed the enemy's mana and increased their own spiritual forces.

He was involved in a siege around the Puke-karora pā in 1824, and took the life of chief Pōmare in May 1826. Continuing to resist the Ngāpuhi iwi, he started arming his people with muskets and powder, and sought to take ownership of several areas. About 1828, the Kaiuku siege at Ōkūrārenga at Hawke's Bay where a coalition including Tumuhuia of the Ngāti Maru commanded an attacking army of over a thousand soldiers to avenge past defeats involving the Ngāti Kahungunu and Ngāpuhi.

One of the two rangatira who refused to sign the Treaty of Waitangi in May 1840, Tumuhuia sought to continue using force to resolve issues as required, which he did in 1842 when killing senior members of the Ngāi Te Rangi iwi of Tauranga, at Ongare Point. Returning to Purua (Note: Possibly Puru on the Thames Coast. Another account indicated Tumuhuia's headquarters to be at Kauwaeranga near the Waihou River mouth.) with captured members, he then consumed them in a hāngī, and placed the heads on poles around the pā. A basket of flesh was sent as a present to Te Horetā (Hook-nose) who declined, saying he had "given up such dark practices". He upset the Christian settlers on his return too, when his warriors "amused themselves by rolling a severed head into the mission station nearby". The Tauranga incident resulted in the arrival of the chief protector of aborigines, George Clarke and Bishop George Selwyn to investigate, whereby Tumuhuia admitted to the killings, stating it was as his people had done over the generations, and it did not involve the Europeans. His actions resulted in the view "Maori were British subjects, whether or not they had signed the Treaty". (However so few police and military troops meant that laws would be difficult to enforce in the colony.)

In 1850 Tumuhuia became the paramount leader of the Ngāti Maru and the Ngāti Tamaterā iwi, who was connected to the Ngatiraukawa, Ngaiterangi, Ngatiawa, Ngatikahungunu, and other iwi.

September 1864 saw Tumuhuia working with another Māori chief William Thompson over Penetaka's native rebellion within Tauranga district.

May 1868 saw Governor George Bowen visit the Thames River area and meet with "Taraia Ngakuti", "the celebrated aged chief of the Ngatitamateri tribe", who welcomed the Governor in the presence of a number of other influential chiefs.

=== Land titles ===
The 1850s gold discovery and mining resulted in land disputes for Tumuhuia. Concerns of hostility by Tumuhuia around Tauranga were still raised in 1864, including the threatening of surveyors. The iwi received compensation in September 1866 for relinquishing claim over Tauranga lands between Katikati and Te Puna, for £500, and Tumuhuia himself for other £100 claims. December 1868 saw Tumuhuia sign another agreement to cede lands to the government for gold-mining purposes, to a deposit of £1500 in the Ohinemuri area. Attempts in 1865 by the government to pressure Tumuhuia and Te Hira to open up the Thames area to gold mining were unsuccessful – it was even requested to "bring down" the chiefs:

Of the former of these chiefs [Taraia] I do not think I need say anything. He is well known as being most astute and most untrustworthy, and his exploits in cannibalism some years ago are not likely to be forgotten by the older settlers. Te Hira, although not so well known, is a man of a very dangerous character.

(It appears Tumuhuia was in favour but restrained by Te Hira, c. 1867. In October 1868, Te Hira was definitely a "Kingite", who desired to keep out the gold diggers, while Tumuhuia was a "Queenite" who wished to lease the lands to the government; although interestingly it was stated after Tumuhuia's death seven years later, the local Māori supported the "opening [of] the district for gold mining purposes", as if Te Hira was in favour and Tumuhuia had been blocking the deal. The division was in Te Hira's ranks. After Tumuhuia's death, Te Hira and his cousin, Maori chieftainess Mere Kuru Te Kate (d. Aug 1905), "the dour old diehard", commanded the iwi.)

== Later years ==
Tumuhuia favoured the Māori King movement.

Tumuhuia was given to have a son, Te Kereihi. His daughter was Meretitiha Tara. Tumuhuia's grandson Tei (and the nephew of Te Hira) died from consumption on 25 November 1867, and Tumuhuia's wife Peata died after a long illness on 1 December 1867, aged c. 70.

It was reported Tumuhuia remained friends with the European settlers as noted by Governor Thomas Browne, and was in receipt of a pension in later years. One newspaper preemptively reported in June 1870 that "the great chief of the Thames" "had made up his mind that he would die last night", acknowledging Tumuhuia was one of the last of the Māori of his status. Estimated to be "probably nearly 100 years" old, he had been spending his days "at Butt's Corner, sitting in the sun, looking on at the busy life of the Europeans, which had changed the very face of the land where he had formerly reigned with more than royal power".

In his last months, Tumuhuia lived in an 8 square feet (0.74 m^{2}) detached house that was not "not to be compared with a second-rate pigstye", where his government pension was being "pounced upon by the numerous cormorants [greedy persons]... even his own daughter being the worst of them".

At the time of his death on the morning of Wednesday, 13 March 1872 at Thames, Tumuhuia was believed to be over 80 (and perhaps closer to a century) and was considered tapu (a protected figure). It was reported at the time he was the last of the "genuine cannibals", a warrior of "almost unbroken successes", and so old to have remembered Captain James Cook's 1769 visit. (Note: It is suggested that Tumuhuia did not see Cook as he would not have been yet born, being about fifteen years younger than Te Horetā who was born c. 1757 and had met Cook in November 1769 in Mercury Bay aged about twelve.) Announced by volleys of firearms, his death was expected for some time, with preparations made for a large funeral tangihanga:

Nearly twenty tons of flour, two tons of biscuits, one ton of sugar with bullocks, pigs, potatoes, and kumaras ad lib. are on the spot for the tangi. Maoris from all parts of the island are invited, and expected to come to do honour to the memory of the departed great. Taraia Ngakuti was one of the most valiant of New Zealand's warriors, and quite a terror to antagonistic tribes.

His coffin was made of kauri wood, lined and padded, and a pane of glass to allow for viewing; the name plate bearing a golden crown, and the name, Taraia Ngakuti.

On 20 April 1872, the Governor Sir George Bowen and the Minister for Native Affairs Donald McLean attended Ohinemuri for the tangi, where a number of addresses were given by assembled chiefs and a response by Governor with "He was a great chief in war, and a great friend to the pakeha in peace. He was known to all the tribes throughout the island as the principal chief of Hauraki".

== Chief Haora Tareranui (1860s–1932) ==
One of Tumuhuia's sons, Tareranui, had a son who became the chief of the Ngati-te-Matera iwi by about 1860. Haora Tareranui, considered "a leader of the race" and estimated to be nearly 90 years-of-age, died in August 1932 at his permanent residence at Paeroa. It was his efforts in 1875 that arranged the peace settlement between the Waikato and Marutūāhu iwi. Later he was part of the select advisory council of the third Māori king, Mahuta Tāwhiao. An equivalent of a bishop within the Rātana church, converting after being affected by and cured of rheumatism, he was survived by his wife Rangirumaki Pereniki née Tizard.

== See also ==
- Rewi Maniapoto (1807–1894), Ngāti Maniapoto chief
- Wiremu Tamihana ("William Thompson") (1805–1866), Ngāti Hauā chief
- Pōtatau Te Wherowhero (d. 1860), Waikato chief
- List of Māori iwi
