= Kauri Point =

Rural settlement in the Bay of Plenty, New Zealand

- Rural settlement
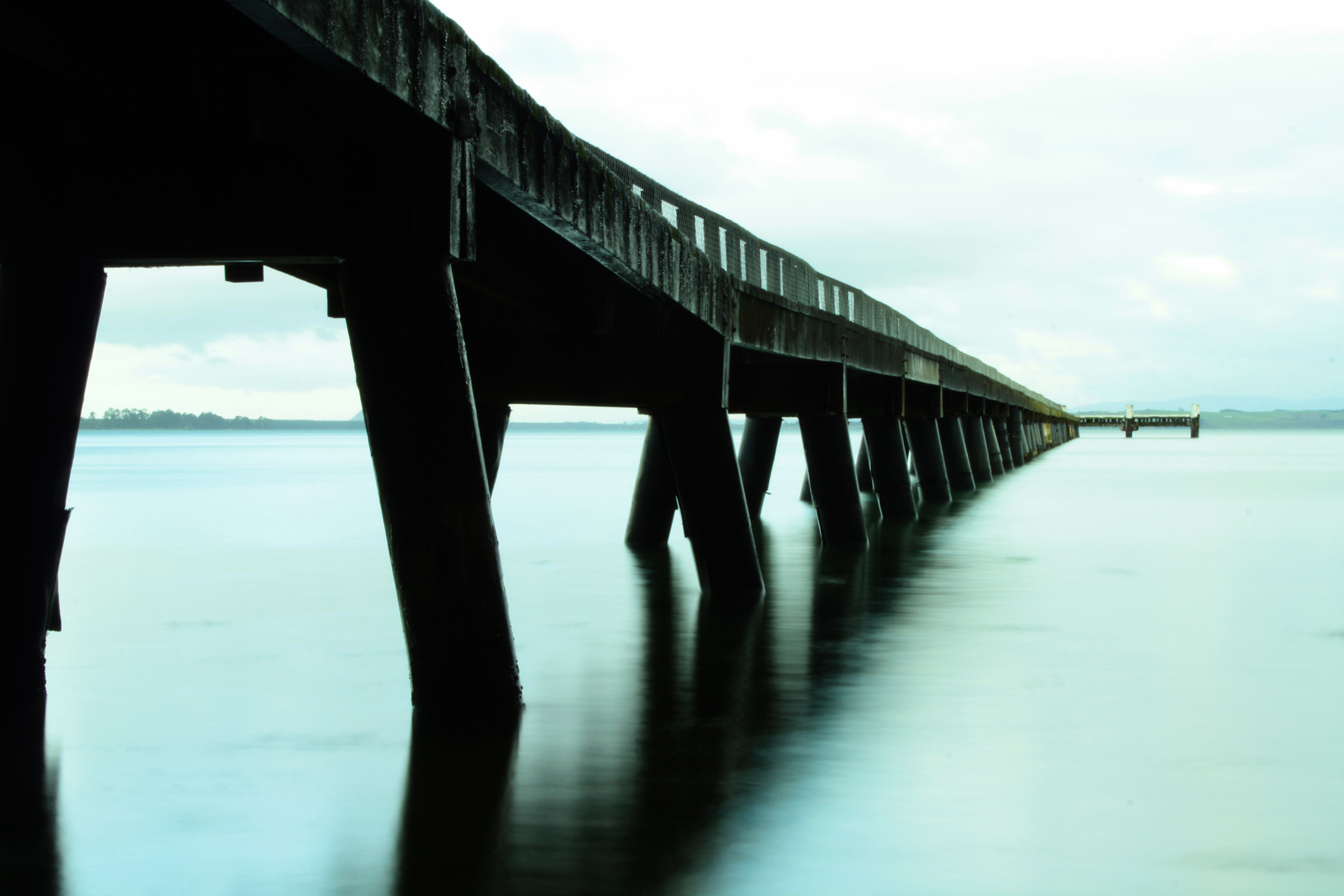
- Interactive map of Kauri Point
- Coordinates: 37.512°S 175.975°E
- Country: New Zealand
- Region: Bay of Plenty
- Territorial authority: Western Bay of Plenty District
- Ward: Katikati-Waihi Beach Ward
- Community: Katikati Community
- Electorates: Coromandel; Waiariki (Māori)

Government
  - Territorial Authority: Western Bay of Plenty District Council
  - Regional council: Bay of Plenty Regional Council
  - Mayor of Western Bay of Plenty: James Denyer
  - Coromandel MP: Scott Simpson
  - Waiariki MP: Rawiri Waititi

Area
  - Total: 0.27 km^{2} (0.10 sq mi)

Population (2023 Census)
  - Total: 186
  - Density: 690/km^{2} (1,800/sq mi)
- Postcode(s): 3170

Kauri Point is a rural settlement in the Western Bay of Plenty District and Bay of Plenty Region of New Zealand's North Island. It is on a headland on the eastern side of Tauranga Harbour, opposite Matakana Island.

A coastal walkway through Kauri Point Historic Reserve connects Kauri Point to Ongare Point. There are mature pōhutukawa trees and three pā sites in the reserve. A 200 metre long wooden jetty, built after 1947, provides fishing access to the harbour.

Dorothy Morris was a pioneer of the kiwifruit industry in New Zealand who she converted her dairy farm on Kauri Point Road to kiwifruit in the 1950s.

George Vesey Stewart, who organised settlement of Katikati in the 1870s, initially planned for the town to be established at Kauri Point. The settlement at Kauri Point did not eventuate until the 1970s.

== Demographics ==
Ōngare Point-Kauri Point is described by Statistics New Zealand as a rural settlement. Kauri Point covers 0.27 km^{2} (0.10 sq mi). It is part of the larger Tahawai statistical area.

Historical population
Year	Pop.	±% p.a.
2006	189	—
2013	171	−1.42%
2018	177	+0.69%
2023	186	+1.00%

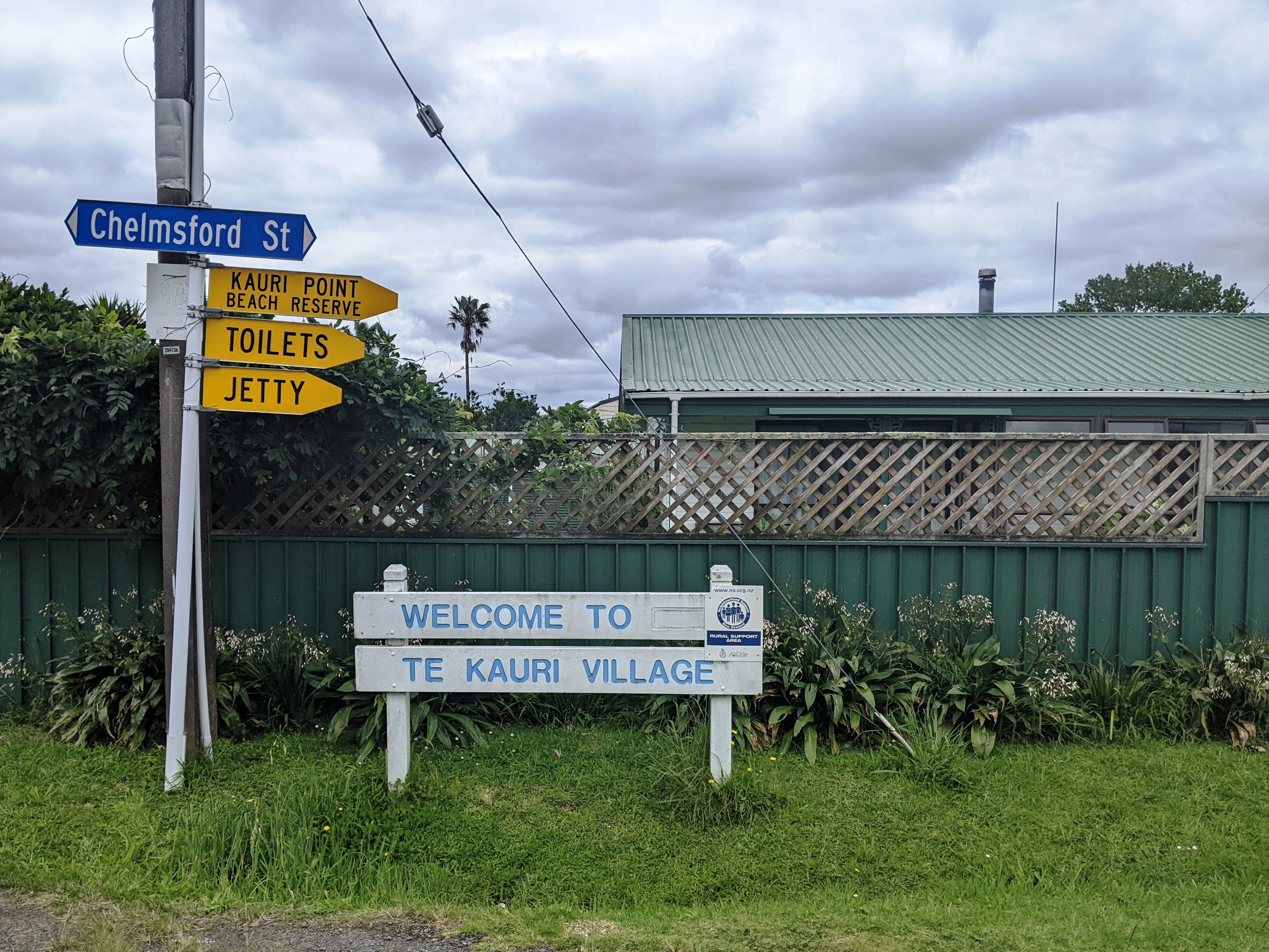
Welcome sign at Kauri Point

Kauri Point had a population of 186 in the 2023 New Zealand census, an increase of 9 people (5.1%) since the 2018 census, and an increase of 15 people (8.8%) since the 2013 census. There were 87 males and 102 females in 75 dwellings. 3.2% of people identified as LGBTIQ+. The median age was 50.2 years (compared with 38.1 years nationally). There were 39 people (21.0%) aged under 15 years, 21 (11.3%) aged 15 to 29, 81 (43.5%) aged 30 to 64, and 48 (25.8%) aged 65 or older.

People could identify as more than one ethnicity. The results were 90.3% European (Pākehā), 17.7% Māori, 1.6% Pasifika, and 3.2% other, which includes people giving their ethnicity as "New Zealander". English was spoken by 98.4%, Māori by 4.8%, and other languages by 4.8%. No language could be spoken by 1.6% (e.g. too young to talk). The percentage of people born overseas was 14.5, compared with 28.8% nationally.

Religious affiliations were 27.4% Christian. People who answered that they had no religion were 64.5%, and 8.1% of people did not answer the census question.

Of those at least 15 years old, 30 (20.4%) people had a bachelor's or higher degree, 87 (59.2%) had a post-high school certificate or diploma, and 27 (18.4%) people exclusively held high school qualifications. The median income was $33,200, compared with $41,500 nationally. 9 people (6.1%) earned over $100,000 compared to 12.1% nationally. The employment status of those at least 15 was 60 (40.8%) full-time, 18 (12.2%) part-time, and 6 (4.1%) unemployed.
