= Matthew Tukaki =

New Zealand–Australian businessman

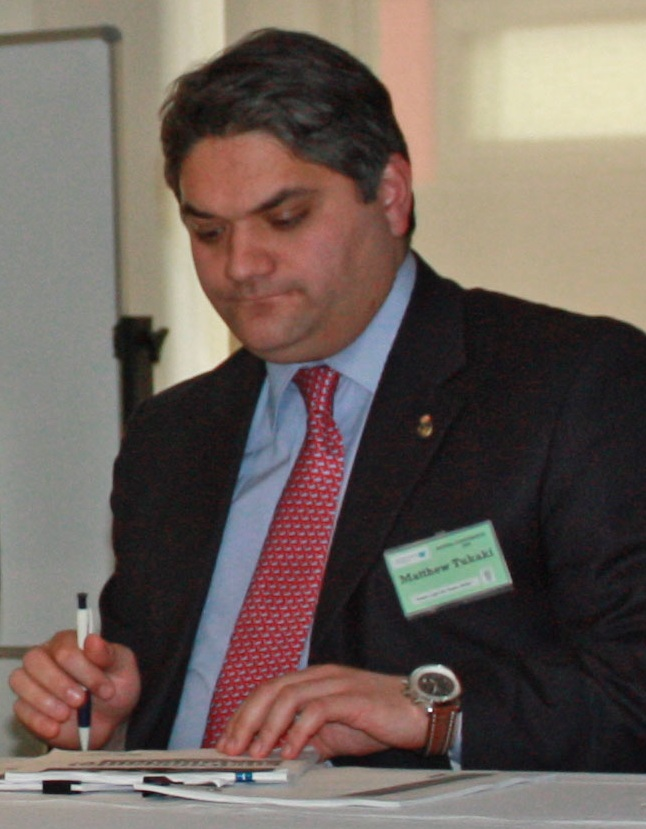
- Tukaki in 2009

Australian Representative United Nations Global Compact
- In office June 2010 – September 2012
- In office September 2012 (2nd term) – November 2013

Personal details
- Born: 10 August 1974 (age 52) Upper Hutt, New Zealand
- Profession: Businessman

Matthew Tamahae Tukaki (born 10 August 1974) is a New Zealand businessman.

== Early life ==
Tukaki is of Ngāi Te Rangi descent and has strong tribal affiliations with Matakana Island, which is off the coast of the city of Tauranga in New Zealand's Bay of Plenty. Tukaki attended St Patrick's College, Silverstream (1988–1992) in Wellington, New Zealand.

== United Nations Global Compact ==
Matthew Tukaki was the United Nations Global Compact's Australian Representative from 2010 to November 2013. He led Australia's business delegation to the United Nations Conference on Sustainable Development (also known as Rio+20) in 2012. He became a member of the board of the United Nations Global Compact in May 2013. That same month, he was elected chairperson of the United Nations Global Compact's Local Network Advisory Group. He was the first person to be elected as Australian representative, and the first person to be appointed by the secretary general in the role of LN Representative on the governing board of the UNGC. He was also the first Australian / New Zealander and the first person of Māori descent.

Tukaki has been active in his support for business and industry to play a larger role when it comes to sustainable development and the United Nations Post 2015 Agenda. In an interview with Radio New Zealand in September 2013, Tukaki indicated a strong desire for business to play a primary role in developing technological advances as a way to solve some of the "big challenges of our time". Tukaki retired from his United Nations Global Compact roles in November 2013. He denied press reports that he was asked to resign due to "an alleged serious breach of Director's Duties".

In his memoir, Sir Mark Moody-Stuart. Vice Chair of the United Nations Global Compact and former chairman of Royal Dutch Shell, recognised Tukaki's work and leadership in the reform process when he was the chairman of the Local Networks Advisory Group. The reform led to a range of initiatives being developed, such as a new collaborative fundraising framework, deeper engagement with transnational and multinational corporations, and a frontier fund to help United Nations Global Compact Networks with material and financial support.

In February 2014, Tukaki announced the formation of a global initiative to be known as EntreHub. The organisation was formed to support budding entrepreneurs, with a target of having 100,000 people involved in the conversation by the end of 2014. EntreHub announced in January 2015 that there were more than 50,000 members, in 130 countries.

== Broadcasting and radio ==
In 2016, Tukaki joined 2UE Talking Lifestyle network as co-host of the "Talking Lifestyle; Second Career" radio show. The show was initially broadcast from 9 pm to 11 pm before changing to run through to midnight. Tukaki also co-hosted the afternoon slot with Ed Phillips between 3 and 4 pm and is a regular across the network on the Morning Mix and Breakfast show. Tukaki became a solo host in December 2016 when the network undertook a programme change. In the 2017, a survey showed Tukaki's show was one of the few that went up the ratings period. In April 2018, Tukaki signed off from the 2UE Radio Network for the last time after the network announced it would become a 24-hour sports broadcaster. Tukaki said publicly he did not want to make the transition.

== New Zealand Māori Council and National Māori Authority ==
In November 2017, Tukaki was appointed executive chairman of the National Māori Authority, Ngā Ngaru Rautahi O Aotearoa. In 2018, he became the chair of the Auckland District Māori Council, one of the sixteen districts of the New Zealand Māori Council. In July, Tukaki was elected to the National Executive of the New Zealand Māori Council with a clear agenda on moving the council towards leading the national social policy debate. This new agenda began to emerge across a number of fronts including suicide prevention, homelessness and the affordability of life-extending and life-saving drugs for Māori. The latter was the first call to the Māori Affairs Select Committee of the New Zealand Parliament in its history. He was then appointed Executive Director of the Council. Tukaki was not re-elected to the Auckland District Council in the 2021 triennial election and became ineligible to continue as Executive Director. He continued to operate in the role for some months as he challenged the result in the High Court over apparent irregularities in the election, however he was unsuccessful, with the Court recommending the allegations be instead dealt with by the Māori Council's own processes. Tukaki has been involved in a large number of public, social, and economic policy areas across the Māori world.

== Ministry for Children (Oranga Tamariki) ==
In January 2021, the New Zealand Government appointed Tukaki as chair of the Ministerial Advisory Board of Oranga Tamariki, with fellow board members being Dame Naida Glavish, Sir Mark Solomon, and Shannon Pakura. The Government said that Tukaki would lead a broad reaching review of the Agency to report by 30 June 2021. Oranga Tamariki, also known as the Ministry for Children, is responsible for New Zealand's care and protection system as well as the youth justice sector. Tukaki is also Chair of the New Zealand Ministry of Health's Māori Health Monitoring Group and leads the negotiations into radio spectrum on behalf of Māori with the Crown.

On 29 September 2021, Tukaki was joined by New Zealand Minister for Children, Kelvin Davis, for the release of the report into the child protection system, called Kahu Aroha. The Government accepted all the recommendations in the report and announced that the board that Tukaki chairs (with members Dame Naida Glavish, Sir Mark Solomon and former Chief Social Worker, Shannon Pakura) would monitor their implementation. Crucially, the recommendations include establishing permanent governance arrangements of the Ministry, devolution of resources, and decision making to communities. The report is being recognised as the single largest overhaul in the sector in a generation and comes off the back of the establishment of a Royal Commission into Abuse in Care that was due to report in 2023.

== Other activities ==
Software business patents dispute: In 2003, Tukaki courted controversy and widespread support when he joined with Senator John Tierney in what was described as a battle of common sense with American company DE Technologies. Tukaki and Senator Tierney challenged the patent holder to show cause and credibility of why they were targeting Australian companies for a percentage of the transaction value of payments made over the internet. The dispute was later resolved and is recognised as being a turning point in how software method patents are dealt with. As a result, no Australian companies or organisations were impacted by the enforcement of the patents under question.

Employment and the 2008 financial crisis: During the 2008 financial crisis, Tukaki was cautious in his assessment of what the impacts would be on jobs and employment, particularly in Australia. In 2010, he told the Sydney Morning Herald that employers were more concerned about skill shortages in some professions and that the "usual December slowdown had failed to arrive". This was different to a year earlier where he had told an online news service, "The significance of underemployment is still not statistically understood and is usually where an employee may have moved from permanent work to casual or part-time work, with many moving to two part-time jobs on less salary than the previous full-time job." Throughout 2010 and into 2011, the cautious approach of looking at where jobs were being created and the changing dynamic of the labour market led Tukaki to become known as one of the most influential employment figures in the region.

Role in suicide prevention and mental health: After joining the Board of Suicide Prevention Australia in 2010, Tukaki played an active role in the restructuring of the organisation as it developed a new strategy to halve suicide in Australia within a decade. He chaired the initial meetings that led to the formation of Australia's first coalition to undertake that task and has chaired the annual Life Awards since 2010 that acknowledge the contribution of individuals and organisations in the community who are actively working towards reducing stigma, providing support and prevention projects. In June 2014 he told Australia's Channel 9 "It's tough out there for so many in the community and we need to take stock of whether or not we are doing all we can to support not just young people but also our older population, those in rural and remote communities because unless we start having these conversations the black dog (referring to depression) will always chase us around the room." In 2015 Tukaki was appointed chairman of Australia's National Coalition for Suicide Prevention. On 28 November Tukaki was elected as the chair of the Board of Suicide Prevention, replacing Murray Bleach.

Tukaki has been heavily associated with business and anti-corruption, telling Radio Australia in 2012 that "There is this false understanding that in order to win a contract in a foreign country, particularly in Asia and the subcontinent, or to do business, you somehow have to pay a bribe". He is well known for his work when it comes to change management in both the private and public sectors as well as his view around the connection between sustainable development, business, and industry.
