= Ngāti Ranginui =

Māori iwi (tribe) in Aotearoa New Zealand

- Iwi (tribe) in Māoridom
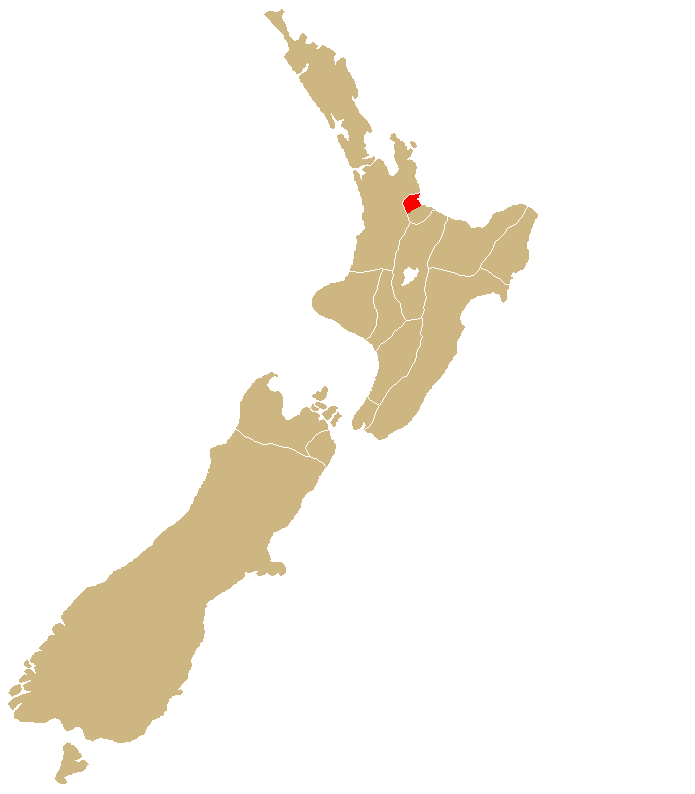
- Rohe (region): Tauranga
- Waka (canoe): Tākitimu
- Website: www.ranginui.co.nz

Ngāti Ranginui is a Māori iwi (tribe) in Bay of Plenty, New Zealand. Its rohe (tribal area) extends from Waihi in the north, to the Kaimai Range in the west, to south of Te Puke in the south, and to Tauranga in the east. The rohe does not extend offshore to Matakana Island or Mayor Island / Tūhua.

Ngāti Ranginui is part of the Tauranga Moana iwi group, which also includes Ngāti Pūkenga and Ngāi Te Rangi. The three iwi all consider Mauao (Mount Maunganui) sacred and share many things in common. Collectively, the iwi are seeking compensation from the New Zealand Government for their losses from the New Zealand Wars but are yet to seek a settlement.

== History ==
Ranginui is the founding ancestor of the iwi. In Tauranga traditions, Ranginui was the son of Tamatea-pokai-whenua from the Takitimu canoe. Ranginui was the brother of Kahungunu (the founding ancestor of Ngāti Kahungunu) and Whaene. His brothers eventually moved to other regions of the North Island, while he remained in Tauranga, settling along the Wairoa River. His descendants would eventually form the Ngāti Ranginui iwi.

In 1864, the Tauranga Moana iwi collectively fought against Crown troops stationed in Tauranga. A notable victory occurred at Gate Pā, but eventually thousands of hectares of land was confiscated. Ngāti Ranginui continues to seek redress with the New Zealand Government for their losses in the New Zealand Wars of the 1860s, together with the other Tauranga Moana iwi.

== Governance ==
Ngāti Ranginui Iwi Society Inc is the Tūhono organisation of Ngāti Ranginui. It is an incorporated society, governed by one representative from each of ten marae. As of 2016, the chairperson Tawharangi Nuku, the chief executive is Stephanie O'Sullivan and the trust is based in Tauranga.

Ngā Hapū o Ngāti Ranginui Settlement Trust is a governance entity recognised by the New Zealand Government since the Treaty of Waitangi settlement between the iwi and the Crown on 21 June 2012. It is a common law trust, governed by eight trustees elected by member hapū plus an independent chair. As of 2016, the trust chairperson is Te Pio Kawe and the trust is based in Tauranga.

Ngāti Ranginui Fisheries Trust is the mandated iwi organisation of Ngāti Ranginui under the Māori Fisheries Act, an iwi aquaculture organisation under the Māori Commercial Aquaculture Claims Settlement Act and a Tūhono organisation. It is a charitable trust governed by seven trustees elected from the iwi whānui. As of 2016, the trust chairperson is Christopher Stokes and the trust is based in Tauranga.

The iwi has interests in the territory of Bay of Plenty Regional Council, Western Bay of Plenty District Council and Tauranga City Council.

== Media ==
Moana Radio is the radio station of Ngāti Ranginui and the other Tauranga Moana iwi. It is available on 1440 AM and 98.2 FM in Tauranga and across the Bay of Plenty. Moana previously operated youth-oriented urban contemporary Tahi FM between 2003 and late 2011.

== See also ==
- List of Māori iwi
