= Tauranga Living Seawall =

Ecologically engineered seawall in Tauranga, New Zealand

- Concrete habitat units among shoreline rocks at the Tauranga Living Seawall, New Zealand

General information
- Status: Completed
- Location: The Strand, Tauranga, New Zealand
- Completed: May 2024 (seapod installation)
- Cost: NZ$3.9 million
- Client: Tauranga City Council

Design and construction
- Structural engineer: WSP
- Other designers: Reef Design Lab and the Sydney Institute of Marine Science (habitat units)

The Tauranga Living Seawall is a rock revetment on the city-centre waterfront of Tauranga, New Zealand, that incorporates 100 precast concrete habitat units, known locally as seapods, designed to provide habitat for intertidal marine life. Located at the northern end of The Strand on the edge of Tauranga Harbour (Te Awanui), it was built by Tauranga City Council as part of a wider redevelopment of the waterfront, with funding support from Port of Tauranga. The seapods were installed in May 2024 and were described by the council at the time as the first of their kind in New Zealand.

The units are Living Seawall Boulders, a product developed by the Australian studio Reef Design Lab and the Sydney Institute of Marine Science's Living Seawalls programme. Each contains deep, curved cavities that retain seawater as the tide falls, imitating natural rock pools. Ecological monitoring of the units has been carried out since installation by Toi Ohomai Institute of Technology and the University of Waikato.

== Background ==
Conventional seawalls and other hard coastal defences typically replace natural foreshore and its associated habitats with smooth, uniform surfaces that support relatively few species. Tauranga's city-centre waterfront sits largely on reclaimed land, and the rock pools and other small-scale habitats that once existed along the shoreline were covered by seawalls and wharves.

The living seawall concept was developed in Sydney over roughly three decades of research combining ecology and engineering. Habitat panels installed on a seawall in North Sydney in 2018 were subsequently reported to support 36 per cent more species than an unmodified wall. By 2025, RNZ reported around 20 Living Seawalls installations in Sydney Harbour and roughly 1,000 worldwide.

== History ==
In November 2023 Tauranga City Council announced that work had begun on a living seawall along The Strand, as part of an NZ$84 million waterfront rejuvenation plan the council had adopted the previous year. The council said the project would be built in two stages, the first covering the northern section of the waterfront from Fisherman's Wharf to the tidal stairs. Port of Tauranga contributed towards the cost of the habitat units and rock boulders.

About 100 seapods were placed along the seawall in May 2024. The Bay of Plenty Times reported the living seawall as a NZ$3.9 million project, with the units set among around 5,000 tonnes of rock forming a seawall 175 metres long; WSP's project summary gives the length as 150 metres.

== Design and construction ==
WSP carried out the coastal engineering design of the rock revetment and worked with the council to identify a local source of heavy quarried armour stone. After assessing options, WSP's design team recommended the Living Seawall Boulder units. The units weigh up to 1.2 tonnes each and sit among two layers of armour stone; because each unit is heavier than an individual armour stone, they could be used in place of armour stone on the more gently sloping sections of the wall. WSP considered the units suitable for low-energy wave environments such as Tauranga Harbour.

Rather than shipping finished concrete units from Australia, moulds were produced in Australia and sent to New Zealand, where the units were cast locally. RNZ reported that the moulds were made of silicone and that the local castings used concrete and recycled materials. WSP described the project as having established a procurement pathway for the units in New Zealand.

The landscape design around the wall includes a wide footpath, planting, and concrete stairs set into the seawall, giving the public close access to the units. The council said the surrounding area would include stepped viewing ledges and shallower water so that people of all ages could explore the rock pools. The seapods are located beside a harbourside playground built as part of the same waterfront redevelopment.

== Ecological monitoring ==
Monitoring began in May 2024 and is led at Toi Ohomai by marine scientist David Culliford, in partnership with University of Waikato professor Chris Battershill. Toi Ohomai marine science students conduct surveys recording the abundance of organisms and measuring algal cover and growth.

In February 2025, researchers reported that an early concern - that the units' cavities would fill with sediment - had not eventuated, and that algae were establishing despite recent marine heatwaves. Species recorded by that stage included glass shrimp, cushion stars, bryozoans, ascidians and triplefin fish. Culliford said preliminary findings indicated considerably more life in and on the units than on the surrounding conventional seawall. By mid-2025 the team had also recorded branching algae, nudibranchs, flatworms and large numbers of shrimp, as well as possible early colonisation by the blue "sneezing sponge" found in Tauranga Harbour. Researchers planned to deploy underwater cameras to observe which organisms use the units at high tide.

The site forms part of an international study linked to the Sydney Institute of Marine Science, which compares colonisation of similar units deployed in Sydney Harbour and elsewhere. Public observations are logged through an iNaturalist project. In 2025 the seawall was included as one of several linked research sites in the University of Waikato's Tiwaiwaka Ecological Corridors project, which studies connections between land, estuaries and the coastal marine environment in Tauranga Moana.

== See also ==
- Artificial reef
- Ecological engineering
- Seawall
- Tauranga Harbour
