= Tahawai =

Rural community in the Bay of Plenty, New Zealand

- Rural locality
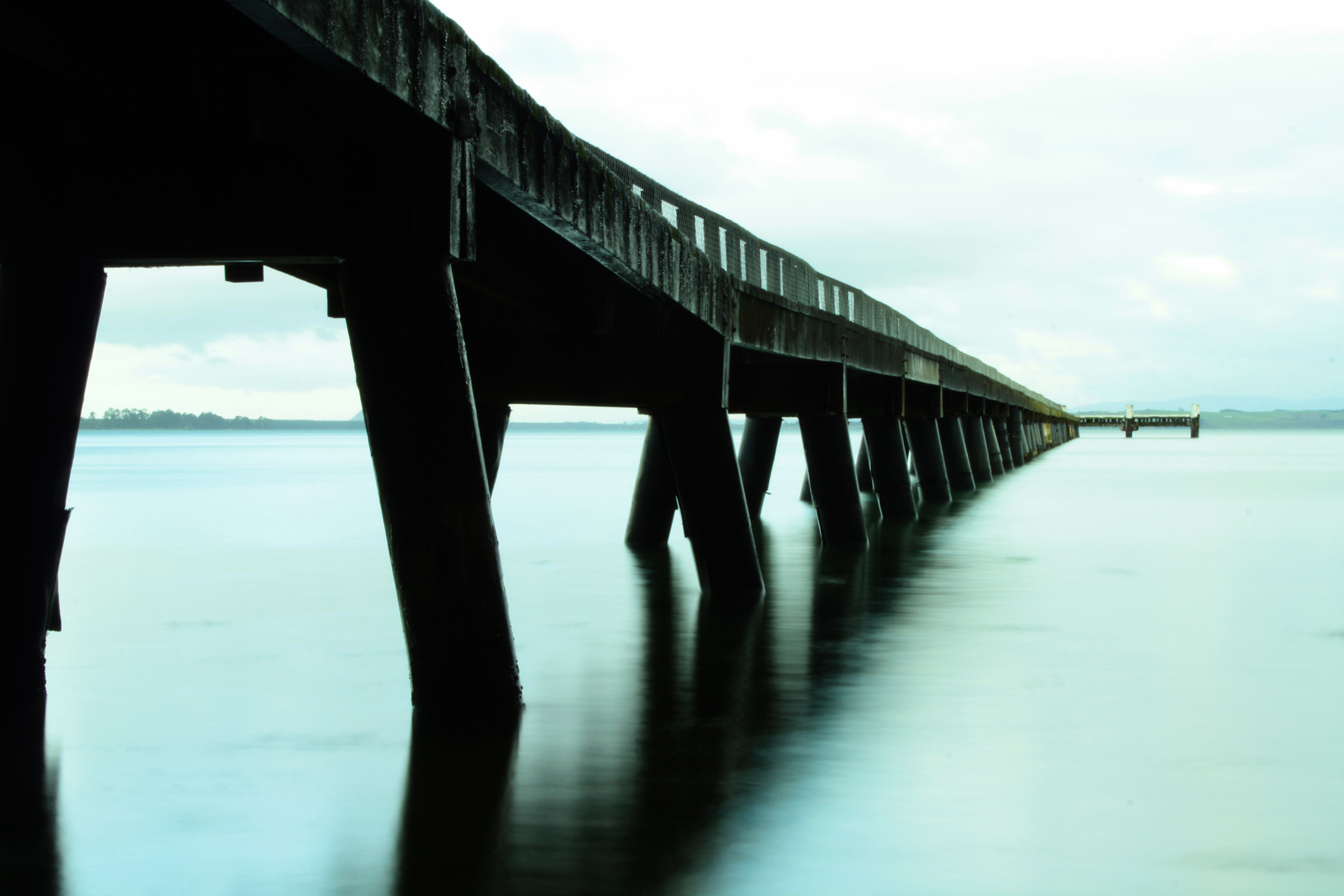
- Kauri Point Jetty
- Interactive map of Tahawai
- Coordinates: 37.519°S 175.920°E
- Country: New Zealand
- Region: Bay of Plenty
- Territorial authority: Western Bay of Plenty District
- Ward: Katikati-Waihi Beach Ward
- Community: Katikati Community
- Electorates: Coromandel; Waiariki (Māori)

Government
  - Territorial Authority: Western Bay of Plenty District Council
  - Regional council: Bay of Plenty Regional Council
  - Mayor of Western Bay of Plenty: James Denyer
  - Coromandel MP: Scott Simpson
  - Waiariki MP: Rawiri Waititi

Area
  - Total: 20.99 km^{2} (8.10 sq mi)

Population (2023 Census)
  - Total: 1,017
  - Density: 48.45/km^{2} (125.5/sq mi)
- Postcode(s): 3170

Tahawai is a rural locality in the Western Bay of Plenty District and Bay of Plenty Region of New Zealand's North Island. State Highway 2 runs through it. A peninsula on the eastern side of the area in Tauranga Harbour ends with the small settlements of Tuapiro Point, Ongare Point and Kauri Point, with a walkway between the latter two. A smaller peninsula further north ends at Tanners Point.

== Demographics ==
Tahawai locality, which includes Tanners Point, Ongare Point and Kauri Point, covers 20.99 km^{2} (8.10 sq mi). It is part of the larger Tahawai statistical area.

Historical population for the locality
Year	Pop.	±% p.a.
2006	957	—
2013	966	+0.13%
2018	1,014	+0.97%
2023	1,017	+0.06%
The 2006 population is for a smaller area of 20.60 km^{2}. Source:

Tahawai locality had a population of 1,017 in the 2023 New Zealand census, an increase of 3 people (0.3%) since the 2018 census, and an increase of 51 people (5.3%) since the 2013 census. There were 546 males and 474 females in 393 dwellings. 2.4% of people identified as LGBTIQ+. There were 129 people (12.7%) aged under 15 years, 132 (13.0%) aged 15 to 29, 471 (46.3%) aged 30 to 64, and 276 (27.1%) aged 65 or older.

People could identify as more than one ethnicity. The results were 85.5% European (Pākehā), 18.3% Māori, 3.8% Pasifika, 5.0% Asian, and 4.1% other, which includes people giving their ethnicity as "New Zealander". English was spoken by 97.3%, Māori by 2.7%, and other languages by 8.6%. No language could be spoken by 1.5% (e.g. too young to talk). New Zealand Sign Language was known by 0.3%. The percentage of people born overseas was 15.9, compared with 28.8% nationally.

Religious affiliations were 28.9% Christian, 0.9% Hindu, 0.6% Māori religious beliefs, 0.6% Buddhist, 0.6% New Age, and 2.1% other religions. People who answered that they had no religion were 57.2%, and 8.3% of people did not answer the census question.

Of those at least 15 years old, 168 (18.9%) people had a bachelor's or higher degree, 516 (58.1%) had a post-high school certificate or diploma, and 201 (22.6%) people exclusively held high school qualifications. 84 people (9.5%) earned over $100,000 compared to 12.1% nationally. The employment status of those at least 15 was 396 (44.6%) full-time, 153 (17.2%) part-time, and 36 (4.1%) unemployed.

=== Tahawai statistical area ===
Tahawai statistical area covers 82.11 km^{2} (31.70 sq mi) and had an estimated population of 1,900 as of June 2025, with a population density of 23 people per km^{2}.

Historical population for the statistical area
Year	Pop.	±% p.a.
2006	1,743	—
2013	1,707	−0.30%
2018	1,833	+1.43%
2023	1,839	+0.07%

Tahawai had a population of 1,839 in the 2023 New Zealand census, an increase of 6 people (0.3%) since the 2018 census, and an increase of 132 people (7.7%) since the 2013 census. There were 948 males, 891 females, and 3 people of other genders in 726 dwellings. 2.4% of people identified as LGBTIQ+. The median age was 55.0 years (compared with 38.1 years nationally). There were 216 people (11.7%) aged under 15 years, 246 (13.4%) aged 15 to 29, 840 (45.7%) aged 30 to 64, and 537 (29.2%) aged 65 or older.

People could identify as more than one ethnicity. The results were 88.4% European (Pākehā); 15.2% Māori; 2.8% Pasifika; 4.1% Asian; 0.2% Middle Eastern, Latin American and African New Zealanders (MELAA); and 4.1% other, which includes people giving their ethnicity as "New Zealander". English was spoken by 98.0%, Māori by 2.4%, Samoan by 0.2%, and other languages by 7.7%. No language could be spoken by 1.3% (e.g. too young to talk). New Zealand Sign Language was known by 0.3%. The percentage of people born overseas was 17.5, compared with 28.8% nationally.

Religious affiliations were 27.4% Christian, 0.5% Hindu, 0.8% Māori religious beliefs, 0.7% Buddhist, 0.8% New Age, and 2.1% other religions. People who answered that they had no religion were 58.4%, and 9.5% of people did not answer the census question.

Of those at least 15 years old, 312 (19.2%) people had a bachelor's or higher degree, 951 (58.6%) had a post-high school certificate or diploma, and 354 (21.8%) people exclusively held high school qualifications. The median income was $35,200, compared with $41,500 nationally. 153 people (9.4%) earned over $100,000 compared to 12.1% nationally. The employment status of those at least 15 was 732 (45.1%) full-time, 294 (18.1%) part-time, and 42 (2.6%) unemployed.
