= Te Horetā =

New Zealand Māori tribal leader (died 1853)

Te Horetā Te Taniwha
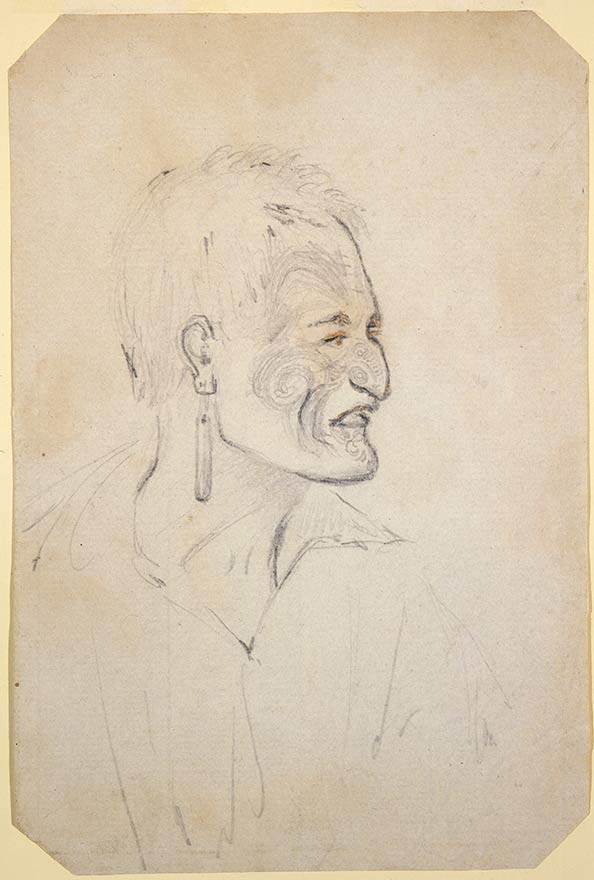
- Contemporary sketch of Te Horeta by Charles Heaphy
- Born: c. 1757
- Died: 21 November 1853 (aged about 96); Coromandel Peninsula, New Zealand

Te Horetā Te Taniwha (c. 1757 – 21 November 1853) was a notable Māori tribal leader of the Ngati Whanaunga iwi, noted for his compassion. Many of his military victories were "won by his prowess, his courage being of a very daring character".

== Heritage ==
It was said he was a direct descendant of Whanaunga, the third son of Marutūāhu, who was the son of Hotunui, one of the leading chiefs of the Tainui.

== Warrior and chief ==
In November 1769, as a young boy of 10, he witnessed HMS Endeavour, captained by James Cook, arrive in Mercury Bay. He was gifted a spike nail that had been fashioned into a chisel, but with a hole so it could be carried around the neck, by "Pene Kuki" (Cook).

As a young man during an inter-iwi fight with the Ngatitamatera, he dove off a cliff, surfaced beside an enemy's canoe which he then commandeered. This earned him the name te Taniwha (sea god).

By 1820 the "tall handsome" man was a chief of the Ngati Whanaunga iwi. A 1754 description gave him as "a daring and successful leader, and noted for his kind nature". This included in battles where he was more merciful than others towards defeated fighters.

At one feast near Waikato there was the usual friendly sham fight of a display of chivalry, where one party darts forward and close to another party, with good feelings prevailing. However a northern chief Ngauri of the Ngapuhi returning from a warlike expedition rushed towards Te Horetā with a bright tomahawk, who responded with intrepidity, which after a desperate struggle saw Ngauri sat-upon by Te Horetā who proclaimed victory. The northern party of one-hundred warriors quickly boarded their canoes and left, leaving their chief to a finality. With calls for the death of Ngauri, and then to pursue his warriors, it was the magnanimous Te Horetā who said "Restrain yourselves; ours is the triumph". Sparing Ngauri's life, that chief was allowed to return to his northern iwi.

A daughter or niece of Te Horetā married a US citizen called Webster by 1839, and the couple came under the protection of Te Horeta. He was known to do this for many Pākehā.

In early May 1840 in the Coromandel Harbour, in the presence of Captain Thomas Bunbury, officer commanding the colony's military forces, and translator Edward Marsh Williams who had arrived on the HMS Herald, four chiefs including Te Horetā as the principal chief of the district became signatories to the Treaty of Waitangi.

Nicknamed Hook-Nose, Te Horetā knew famed chief Tāraia Ngākuti Te Tumuhuia (d. 1872) of the Thames district. In 1842 following a raid on the Ngāi Te Rangi iwi of Tauranga, Tumuhuia sent a basket of human flesh from captured slaves as a present to Te Horetā, who declined, saying he had "given up such dark practices" of cannibalism.

In October 1852, "Old Hooknose" and thirty Māori encountered Charles Ring (1832–1906) and his brother Frederick gold-prospecting around the Coromandel district, and demanded utu (payment) for the tapu (sacred) land intrusion. After a parley, Te Horetā concluded with "I think these are good men. We will let them go". The Ring brothers were allowed to continue finding gold in the district. Following the 1840 Treaty conditions, the government proclaimed in November that miners were prohibited from working for gold until arrangements were made with the Māori. A subsequent conference between Lieutenant-Governor Robert Wynyard, Bishop George Selwyn, and Chief Justice William Martin all representing the government met with chief Te Horetā and chief Hohepa Paraone of the Te Arawa of Rotorua, agreed (i) the government would manage the gold searches for the whole district for three years, (ii) the Māori owners would receive £1 a year for every 1 square mile (2.6 km^{2}), but where (iii) there were 500 to 1000 prospectors the price would be £1 10s, and (iv) an additional 10s for every 500 prospectors thereafter. This started at an initial 16 square miles (41 km^{2}).

== Later years ==
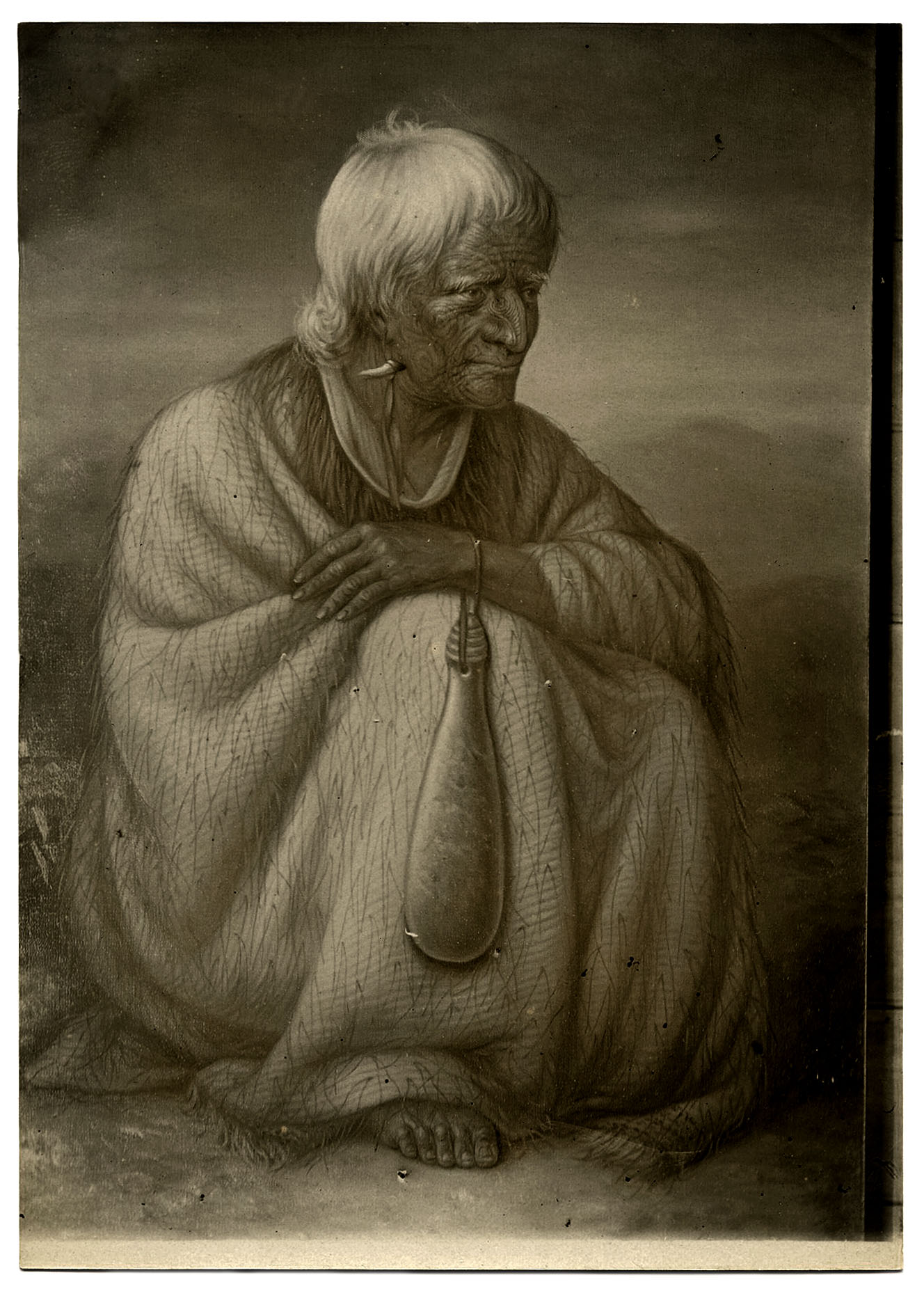
Portrait of Te Horetā, by Gottfried Lindauer, almost certainly painted from a photograph many years after the subject's death.

Te Horetā was renown for his recall of poetry of the country, his "vast legendary stores of knowledge" which was also used to provide requested counsel in other districts, and great skills of oration. One of his relatives was Maihi Mokongohi, chief of the Ngāti Tamaterā iwi.

Circa 1852, on the corner of Queen and Shortland Streets, Auckland, Māori canoes were beached, and this was a favourite spot for Te Horetā to "squat in his blanket, smoking his pipe, and recounting his boyish recollections of the great navigator, Captain Cook".

About six weeks before his death, Te Horetā was baptised into the Church of England by Reverend Thomas Lanfear. He died at Coromandel Harbour on 21 November 1853 within the presence of his iwi. Prior to his death instead of afterwards, he was visited by many persons of distinction, a noted mark of respect for the chieftain. His dying wish was for "the inhabitants of these islands" to dwell in harmony.

Upon his death, his mana descended to his son, Kitahi te Taniwha (d. June 1871), who later went onto be chief of the iwi. Tukumana Te Taniwha was Te Horetā's grandson.

== See also ==
- List of Māori iwi
