= Tanners Point =

Rural settlement in the Bay of Plenty, New Zealand

- Rural settlement
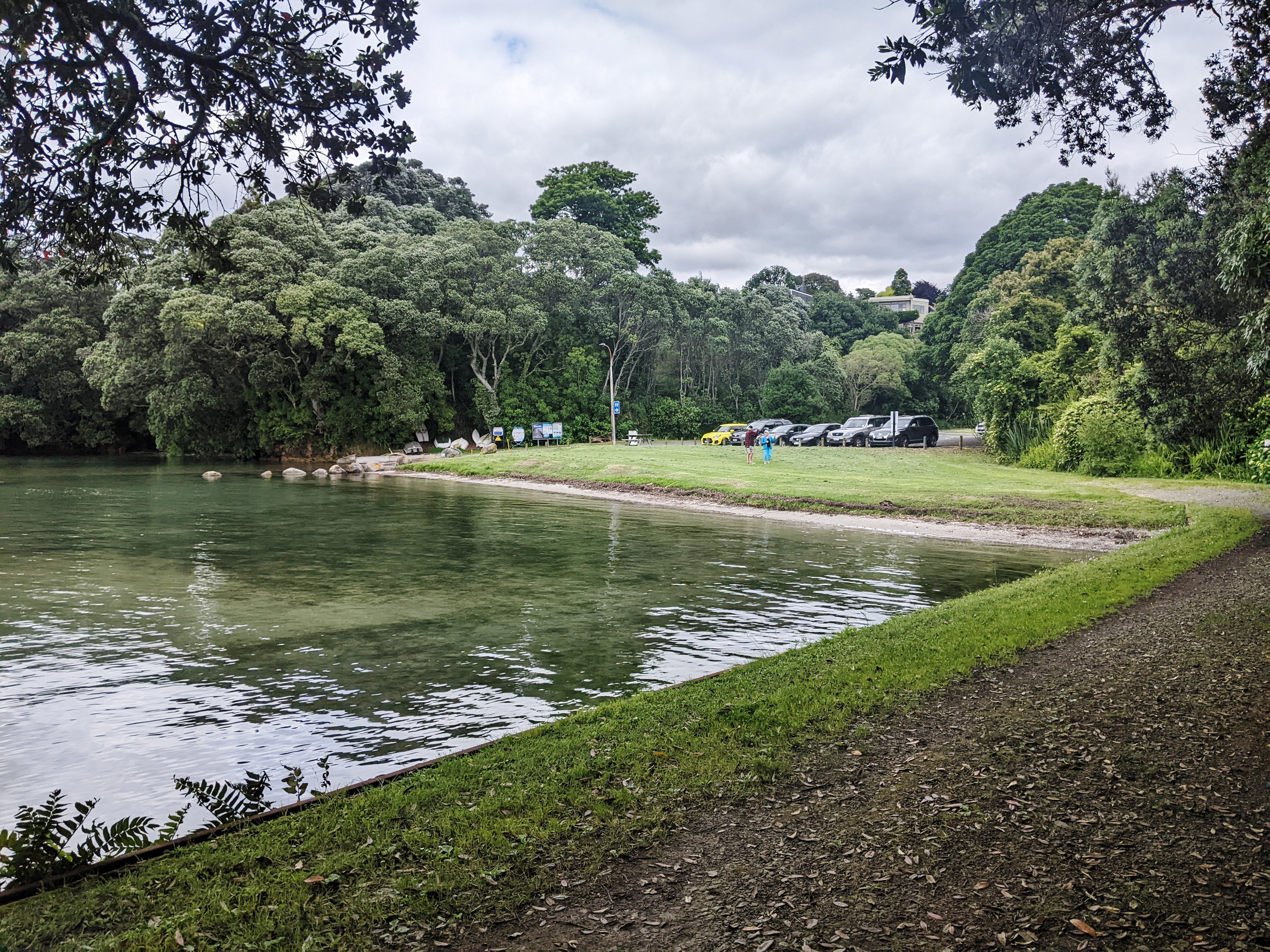
- Tanners Point Recreational Reserve
- Interactive map of Tanners Point
- Coordinates: 37.482°S 175.944°E
- Country: New Zealand
- Region: Bay of Plenty
- Territorial authority: Western Bay of Plenty District
- Ward: Katikati-Waihi Beach Ward
- Community: Katikati Community
- Electorates: Coromandel; Waiariki (Māori)

Government
  - Territorial Authority: Western Bay of Plenty District Council
  - Regional council: Bay of Plenty Regional Council
  - Mayor of Western Bay of Plenty: James Denyer
  - Coromandel MP: Scott Simpson
  - Waiariki MP: Rawiri Waititi

Area
  - Total: 0.45 km^{2} (0.17 sq mi)

Population (June 2025)
  - Total: 210
  - Density: 470/km^{2} (1,200/sq mi)
- Postcode(s): 3177

Tanners Point is a rural settlement in the Western Bay of Plenty District and Bay of Plenty Region of New Zealand's North Island. It is on a headland on the eastern side of Tauranga Harbour, opposite Katikati Entrance.

A reserve and walkway preserve the coastal areas of the settlement.

The area, initially a Native reserve, was first called Frazer's Point and later Tanner's Point for local farmer Thomas Tanner who arrived in New Zealand in 1875. Both names were in use in the early 20th century.

== Demographics ==
Tanners Point is described by Stats NZ as a rural settlement and covers 0.45 km^{2} (0.17 sq mi). It had an estimated population of 210 as of June 2025, with a population density of 467 people per km^{2}. It is part of the larger Tahawai statistical area.

Historical population
Year	Pop.	±% p.a.
2006	216	—
2013	171	−3.28%
2018	201	+3.29%
2023	198	−0.30%

Tanners Point had a population of 198 in the 2023 New Zealand census, a decrease of 3 people (−1.5%) since the 2018 census, and an increase of 27 people (15.8%) since the 2013 census. There were 96 males and 99 females in 90 dwellings. 3.0% of people identified as LGBTIQ+. The median age was 62.9 years (compared with 38.1 years nationally). There were 15 people (7.6%) aged under 15 years, 21 (10.6%) aged 15 to 29, 75 (37.9%) aged 30 to 64, and 87 (43.9%) aged 65 or older.

People could identify as more than one ethnicity. The results were 92.4% European (Pākehā), 9.1% Māori, 1.5% Pasifika, 1.5% Asian, and 4.5% other, which includes people giving their ethnicity as "New Zealander". English was spoken by 98.5%, Māori by 1.5%, and other languages by 6.1%. The percentage of people born overseas was 19.7, compared with 28.8% nationally.

Religious affiliations were 27.3% Christian, 1.5% New Age, and 1.5% other religions. People who answered that they had no religion were 60.6%, and 9.1% of people did not answer the census question.

Of those at least 15 years old, 57 (31.1%) people had a bachelor's or higher degree, 96 (52.5%) had a post-high school certificate or diploma, and 33 (18.0%) people exclusively held high school qualifications. The median income was $36,800, compared with $41,500 nationally. 21 people (11.5%) earned over $100,000 compared to 12.1% nationally. The employment status of those at least 15 was 63 (34.4%) full-time, 24 (13.1%) part-time, and 6 (3.3%) unemployed.
