= Tukumana Te Taniwha =

Māori tribal leader and historian

Tukumana Taiwīwī Te Taniwha (1862/63–1941) was a notable New Zealand Māori tribal leader and historian. He was a leader of the Ngāti Maru and Ngāti Whanaunga iwi. He was born in the Coromandel, New Zealand in probably 1862 or 63. His mother, Karukino Te Taniwha, was the daughter of Te Horetā Te Taniwha.

== Early life ==
Writing in his 1929 manuscript entitled 'Marutuahu', Tukumana states that he was 11 years of age when he attended the great Ngāti Paoa hākari (feast) which took place in 1874. This means that Tukumana was born in 1863, during the first year of the Waikato War.

Tukumana's father was Reihana Poto, of Ngāti Whanaunga and Ngāti Maru, and his mother was Karukino Te Taniwha of Ngāti Whanaunga. Karukino was a daughter of Te Hōreta Te Taniwha and a half sister to Hori Ngakapa Te Whanaunga.

Tukumana Te Taniwha was variously known as Tukumana Reihana (taking his father's first name as his surname, a custom of the time) as well as Tukumana Te Taniwha and Taiwīwī Te Taniwha. The latter names were derived from his mother's family.

== Death ==
Tukumana Te Taniwha died on 28 March 1941. He was mourned at his ancestral home of Waimangō, Firth of Thames, before being interred in the family cemetery there.
