= Charles Ring =

Gold prospector

Charles Ring (1832–1906) was a colonial settler who, despite claims that others had been successful before him, is credited with being the first European to discover significant sources of payable gold in New Zealand in 1852. From a young age Ring worked in business and as a farmer both in Australia and New Zealand. He later spent time as a gold prospector in California after which he returned to New Zealand, and became actively involved in promoting the importance of gold mining in the country. In 1852 Ring claimed a reward for discovering gold in Coromandel, and while his claim was recognised, he did not receive the full reward and is said to have died feeling unappreciated for his contribution to the gold industry. During his time as a farmer and gold prospector, Ring was involved in regular, and largely respectful and productive relationships with the local Māori whose lands were protected under the recently signed Treaty of Waitangi.

== Early life ==
Ring was born in 1832 in Guernsey and after the failure of his father's business career, went to Tasmania at the age of 15. He later moved to Adelaide and opened a general store. When this was burned out, he moved to New Zealand in 1841. He purchased two farms in the Auckland area and while acknowledged as being enterprising in importing stock from Australia, became frustrated with government authorities who blocked his requests for extra suitable land and sold the cattle "by auction on three, six and nine month's bills, owing to there being no money in the place."

Disillusioned with New Zealand, Ring decided to go to the California gold rush, as one of the 'Forty Niners'. Along with his brother, Ring boarded a boat called the Fanny, which after a three-month journey, that included an enforced stopover in the Pitcairn Islands to get water, finally berthed in San Francisco. Upon arrival however the ship was seized by the crew who took what they needed and "deserted to become goldseekers". Ring planned to be a storekeeper in Sacramento, but the boat carrying his supplies was wrecked and he lost everything. Ring intended to return to Sydney, but the boat he travelled on ran into problems close to Fiji and he was eventually picked up by an Americal whaler who brought him to Auckland, New Zealand.

== Gold in New Zealand ==
When Ring arrived back in New Zealand early in 1852, rumours were circulating that there had been gold discovered by whalers, sealers and survey parties in Nelson. This, plus news of success in the goldfields of Australia, prompted Ring along with other prominent miners and citizens of Auckland, to incentivize the exploration for gold in New Zealand and following a public meeting a reward committee, chaired by Sir Frederick Whitaker, was set up and in October 1852, £500 offered to the "first person who should discover and make known to the committee a 'valuable goldfield'".

By November 1852, it is recorded that Ring announced he and his brother, had found gold at "Cabbage Bay, Coromandel, at McCaskill's Driving Creek, Ohinemuri, and at Te Aroha". He took samples back to the committee and while the specimens were noted initially as "exceedingly small...[with the question]...as to whether they contained gold", Ring is said to have impressed them "with a conviction of the reality of a discovery...[resulting in]...his name being registered for the reward". Mr. T. S. Forsaith, secretary to the committee, in acknowledging the application, which had been duly registered, and the specimens accompanying it, said: “I desire, in the absence of Mr. Whitaker, to express the satisfaction which the prospect of eventual success which you entertain affords the committee, and to tender their acknowledgment for the promise of further information". The Reward Committee went to Coromandel and while it was confirmed that there was gold, they questioned whether the amount of the metal was payable and are said to have decided not to pay the full reward of £500 to Ring. Nevertheless, in Bulletin No. 4 of the Geological Survey, The Hauraki District, the claim was recorded as "the first authenticated gold discovery in New Zealand", and in other media, Ring was recognised as the first person to source payable gold.

== Relationships with local Māori ==
In the local press at the time, Ring had some standing as a "good Māori scholar...[with]...great influence with the natives" and is said to have been one of few Europeans who stayed in the area during the Māori war at some risk to himself. During his time in New Zealand, any negotiations with Māori for access to their lands, had to acknowledge that their rights as landowners were to be "strictly preserved" under the Treaty of Waitangi.

When Ring purchased his farms in Auckland the land transactions with local Māori were apparently without difficulty. A local official, Ring and the chief pointed out and agreed on, defined boundaries, with the chief concluding that all was "straight and clear, and tika (correct), the utu (payment) agreed upon handed over, and the incident was closed." Shortly after this, Ring visited the Bay of Islands in the North of New Zealand to purchase stock and found a tense situation as a local warrior, Hōne Heke was threatening to cut down the flagpole. Ring along with other local dignitaries, including a magistrate, followed Heke up the hill, witnessed him cutting down the flagpole and leaving "without molesting a single European, or injuring or looting a pennyworth of their property".

Before he began his search for gold, Ring was given permission by a local Māori leader Te Horetā also known as Te Taniwha, to search the land. The narrative of this interaction describes Ring and his brother Frederick being confronted by Māori, and after a disagreement regarding the handing over of weapons, Te Taniwha called for a "parley" concluding that "I think these are good men. We will let them go".

It was significant that immediately after confirmation of Ring's finding the New Zealand Government decreed that all prospectors were required to get provisional licences until arrangements could be made with local Māori who owned the land. A conference between Governor Wynard, Bishop Selwyn, the Chief Justice and two chiefs, Taniwha and Hohepa Parone, resulted in an agreement, signed on 30 November, that allowed the land to be opened for gold mining for three years and Māori to be paid pro-rata dependent on the number of miners who were also taxed.

== Later years ==
Ring moved to Auckland around 1875 and lived there in "affluent retirement...surrounded by his family...universally esteemed and respected by all those who have the privilege of his acquaintance", before his death in 1906. He is said to have been "greatly disappointed by the non-recognition of his service to the country", but one newspaper noted:

He will long be remembered for his genial, kindly disposition and sterling integrity, as well as for the service he rendered to the colony in general and Auckland in particular by his connection with the gold mining industry.

The house built for Ring in 1852 in a Colonial Regency style is as of 2022, listed as an Historical Place Category 2.

== See also ==
- Mining in New Zealand
- Gold mining
- Coromandel Gold Rushes
