= Tauranga Moana =

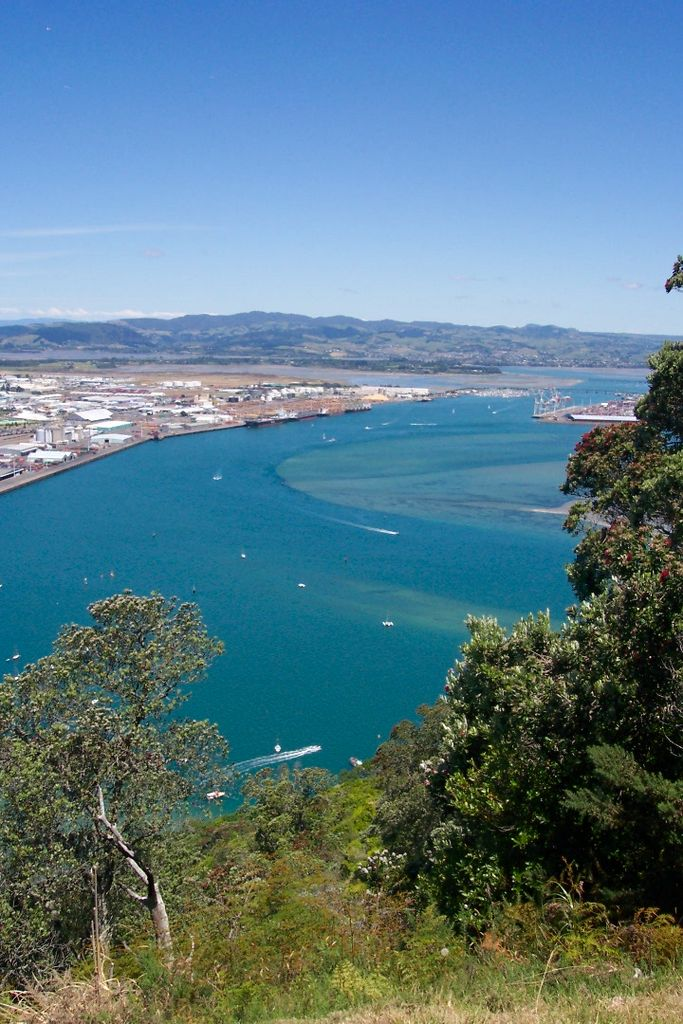
- The Tauranga Harbour, in the rohe (tribal area) of the Hauraki Māori people.

Total population
- 24,000 (2013)

Regions with significant populations
- Tauranga Harbour, Bay of Plenty

Languages
- Māori language

Tauranga Moana are a grouping of Māori iwi (tribe) based in and around the Tauranga Harbour and Bay of Plenty. The grouping consists of Waitaha-a-Hei, Ngāti Ranginui, Ngāti Pūkenga, Ngāi Te Rangi and its hapū Ngā Pōtiki a Tamapahore.

They trace their origins back to the Mataatua waka.
