= Kaiuku =

- Part of Musket Wars
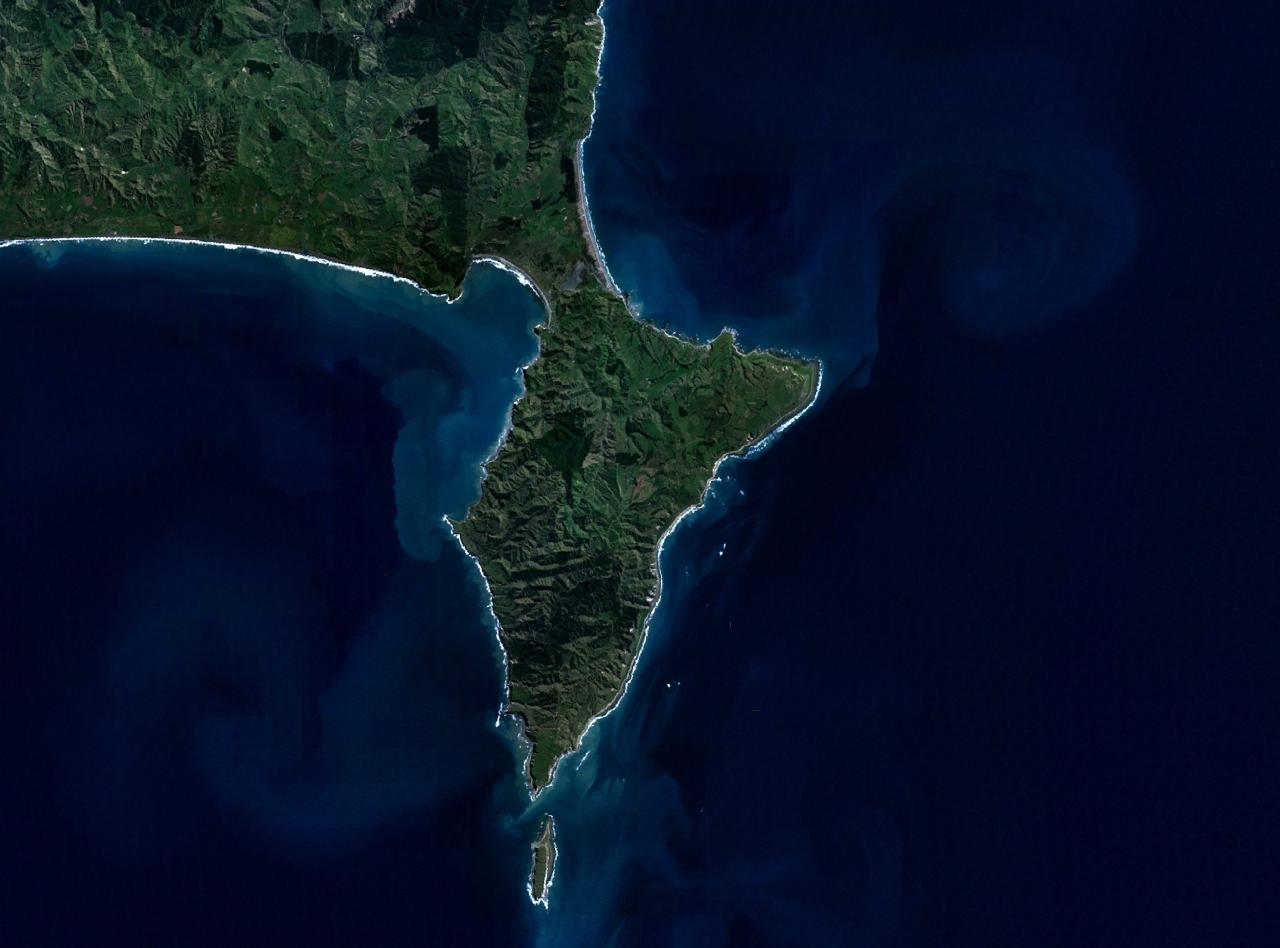
- NASA satellite image of Mahia Peninsula
Date	1828
Location	Ōkūrārenga on Māhia Peninsula, Hawke's Bay, New Zealand 39°09′S 177°54′E

Belligerents
Ngāti Tūwharetoa; Te Arawa; Ngāti Maru; Waikato; Ngāti Raukawa	Ngāti Kahungunu; Ngāpuhi

Commanders and leaders
Mananui Te Heuheu Tūkino II; Te Mokonuiarangi; Tāraia Ngākuti Te Tumuhuia; Paiaka; Te Whatanui	Te Pareihe; Te Wera Hauraki

Kaiuku (Māori for "eat clay") was a siege fought, probably in 1828, at Ōkūrārenga on Māhia Peninsula, Hawke's Bay, New Zealand, as part of the Musket Wars. A coalition of Ngāti Maru, Ngāti Raukawa, Ngāti Tūwharetoa, Te Arawa, and Waikato invaded the Hawke's Bay region and besieged Ngāti Kahungunu and Ngāpuhi at Ōkūrārenga. The defenders were reduced to eating clay, hence the name Kaiuku, but eventually the attackers broke the siege and departed.

The attacking army, numbered over a thousand men, possibly the largest single force assembled by the Māori up to that time. The name given to the coalition forces, Te Hokowhitu a Tū ("army of the war god") was subsequently popularised for other armies and eventually became the Māori name of the Māori Battalion.

== Background ==
In the early 19th century, northern Māori began to acquire European muskets from traders, leading to more intense and wide-ranging warfare than previously. In particular, Hongi Hika of Ngāpuhi led raids across the North Island. In turn, other tribes migrated and led raids elsewhere. In Hawke's Bay, Ngāti Kahungunu were attacked by sea by Ngāpuhi, from the north by Ngāti Porou and from the west by Ngāti Tūwharetoa and Ngāti Raukawa.

In 1823, Te Whareumu of Ngāti Kahungunu convinced Te Wera Hauraki of Ngāpuhi to settle on the Māhia Peninsula in order to defend them from these attacks. Te Whareumu and Te Wera made common cause with another local chief, Te Pareihe of Ngāti Te Whatuiāpiti. Together, they resisted a number of raids.

== Origins ==
In the late 1820s, Te Pōtae-aute of Ngāti Porou wanted to launch a war party against Ngāti Kahungunu in the Hawke’s Bay. He sought aid from Tāraia Ngākuti Te Tumuhuia of Ngāti Maru, Paiaka of Waikato, Mananui Te Heuheu of Ngāti Tūwharetoa, and Te Whatanui and Pēhi Turoa of Ngāti Raukawa (now based in Manawatu). These groups all agreed to participate for different reasons.

Ngāti Maru and Te Arawa wanted to avenge defeats that they had suffered at the hands of Ngāpuhi at Te Totara in 1821 and at Mokoia in 1823, respectively, by attacking Te Wera Hauraki, who was the last survivor of the three great Ngāpuhi generals of the early 1820s and was now based at Māhia peninsula in Hawke’s Bay. Ngāti Tūwharetoa wanted revenge for the defeat they had suffered at Te Whiti-o-Tū during an invasion of Hawke's Bay some years previously and Ngāti Raukawa for the death of Te Momo-a-Irawaru during an invasion in 1827.

== Invasion of Hawke's Bay ==
Therefore in 1828, war parties from all these tribes converged on Hawke’s Bay. Te Heuheu led men from the Ngati Turumakina, Ngati Hukere, and Ngati Hinewai hapu over the Ruahine Range to the Ruataniwha Plains. Te Mokonuiarangi led the Arawa force over the Titiokura pass. When these two forces united, they attacked the Ngāti Kahungunu pā Te Koha and then continued towards Te Māhia. At the Wairoa river, Te Heuheu wanted to fire off all the muskets in order to announce their presence to the other attacking contingents, but his brother Iwikau refused to allow him to do this as it would have cost them the element of surprise. When all the contingents had united, the force exceeded a thousand men and Te Heuheu assumed overall command.

As they crossed the Wairoa river, they encountered and defeated a force of Rongowhakaata, Te Aitanga a Mahaki, Ngai Tahupo, and Te Aitanga-a-Hauiti, which was coming down from the East Cape. During the fighting, Ngāti Tūwharetoa captured the chief Te Heketua-o-te-rangi and his daughter. Te Whatanui wanted to kill these prisoners, but Te Heuheu said that he would not allow anyone captured by his hand to be killed “for it is a tapu hand.” Te Heketua-o-te-rangi was allowed to leave and subsequently returned and gifted a greenstone patu called Te Kaoreore to Te Whatanui, a tiki to Te Kapu, another patu and several mats to Te Heuheu, and six slaves.

== Siege of Ōkūrārenga ==
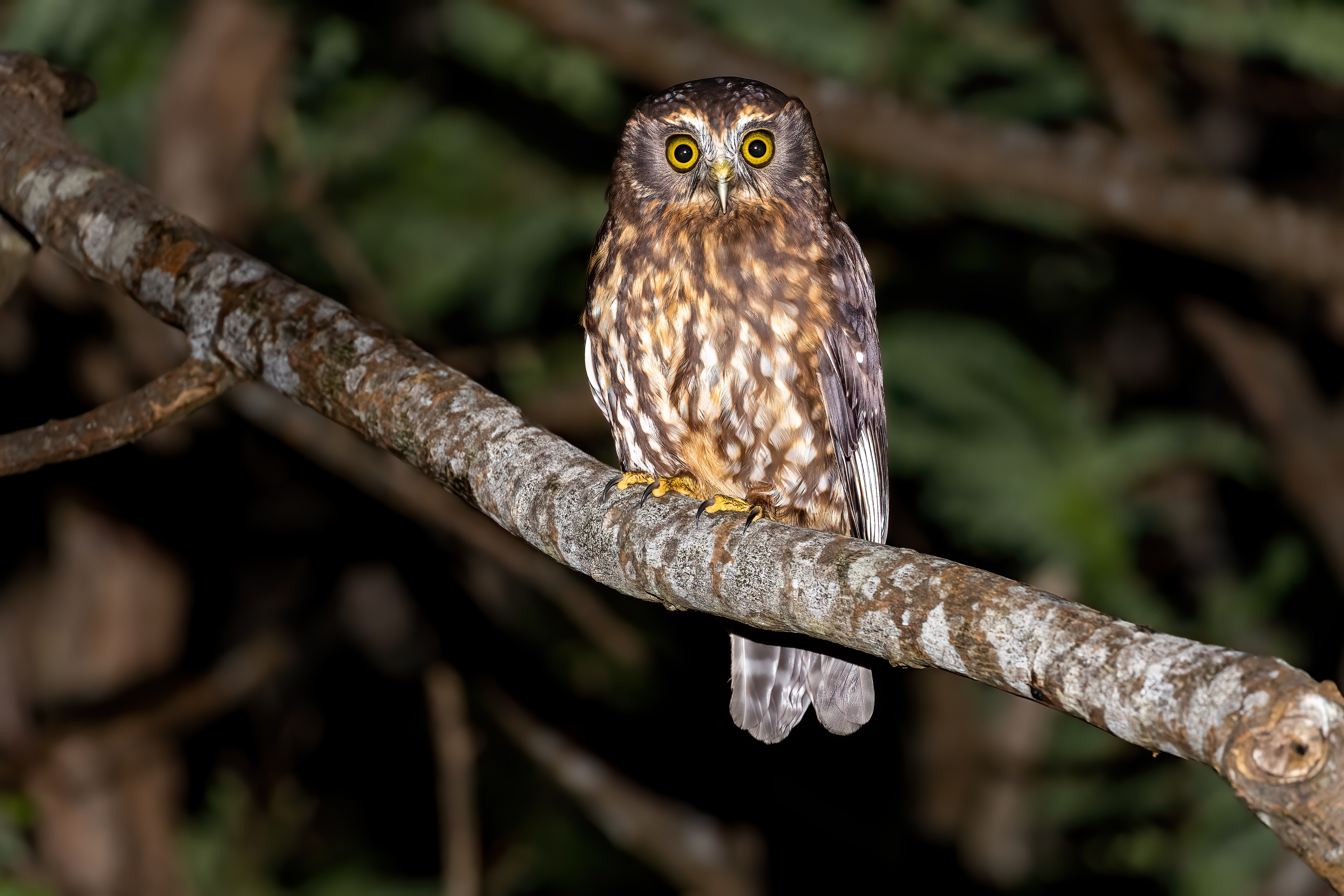
ruru (Morepork owl).

Finally, the war party arrived at Te Māhia, where they found Te Pareihe at Ōkūrārenga, a very strong pā, but with very limited food stocks. When the defenders would not come down to fight, Te Heuheu accused them of behaving like a ruru owl perched in the tawhiwhi, but they shouted back that he was a “grey-headed old man” and ought to go home. Te Kani-a-Takirau of Te Aitanga-a-Hauiti, as well as Rongowhakaata came south to relieve Ōkūrārenga, but were defeated.

The siege dragged on for two months and the defenders inside Ōkūrārenga became so short on food that they ate all of their slaves and then they were reduced to eating the leftover foodwaste, mixed with clay to conceal the taste. Grace reports a rumour that the defenders even ate their children. As a result the pā was renamed Kaiuku ("eating clay").

Waikato proposed to Te Heuheu that the besiegers should pretend to make peace and then massacre the defenders as they came out of the fortress. Te Heuheu refused to allow this; he did not wish to see his relative Te Pareihe “struck down like a slave.” Seeking that the other contingents planned a general massacre, Te Heuheu abandoned the siege and returned to Taupō, declaring to Te Pareihe, “I leave behind the thunder of my footsteps for you to hear.” Possibly, Te Heuheu also took his decision because he had been warned in a dream by the atua Rongomai that Taupō was about to be attacked by Ngāpuhi and Waikato. Toiroa of Ngāti Rongomaiwahine met with Te Heuheu’s daughter Te Rohu and his sister-in-law Pikihuia at Whakarewa to negotiate a peace with Ngāti Tūwharetoa.

Shortly after this, Te Amohau, nephew of the Te Arawa leader, Te Mokonuiarangi, was killed by the defenders. The killer Te Hikiko agreed to hand over the body and, after this was done, the Te Arawa force departed as well. According to Takaanui Tarakawa, Te Hikiko's nephew, this was the decisive moment in the siege.

The remaining Waikato and Ngāti Maru attackers eventually determined that the defenders' suffering had been sufficient and departed as well, ending the siege.

== Sources ==
The siege is mentioned briefly by Takaanui Tarakawa, drawing on the account of his father Te Ipututu Tarakawa, who was one of Te Wera's warriors. John Te Herekiekie Grace recounts the Ngāti Tūwharetoa tradition.

Percy Smith tells the same anecdote about a pā being renamed Kaiuku, but all other details are different. He places it at Pukekaroro (also on the Māhia peninsula) in August 1824, as part of Te Mautaranui's war against Ranga-ika of Ngāti Kahungunu.

== Bibliography ==
- Tarakawa, Takaanui (1900). "Nga mahi a Te Wera, me Nga-Puhi hoki, ki Te Tai-Rawhiti/ The Doings of Te Wera and Nga-Puhi on the East Coast". The Journal of the Polynesian Society. 9: 47–62, 65–84, 135–141.
- Smith, Percy (1910). Maori Wars of the Nineteenth Century. Christchurch: Whitcombe and Tombs Limited.
- Grace, John Te Herekiekie (1970) [1959]. Tuwharetoa: The history of the Maori people of the Taupo District. Auckland [N.Z.]: A.H. & A.W. Reed. ISBN 9780589003739.
- Ballara, Angela. "Te Wera Hauraki". Dictionary of New Zealand Biography. Ministry for Culture and Heritage.
