= Pene Taka Tuaia =

New Zealand warrior

Pene Taka Tuaia (died 3 July 1889) was a New Zealand warrior, military engineer and land protester. Of Māori descent, he identified with the Ngāi Te Rangi iwi. He was the engineer of the fortification known as the Gate Pā, at Pukehinahina.
