= Matakana Island =

Island in the Bay of Plenty, New Zealand

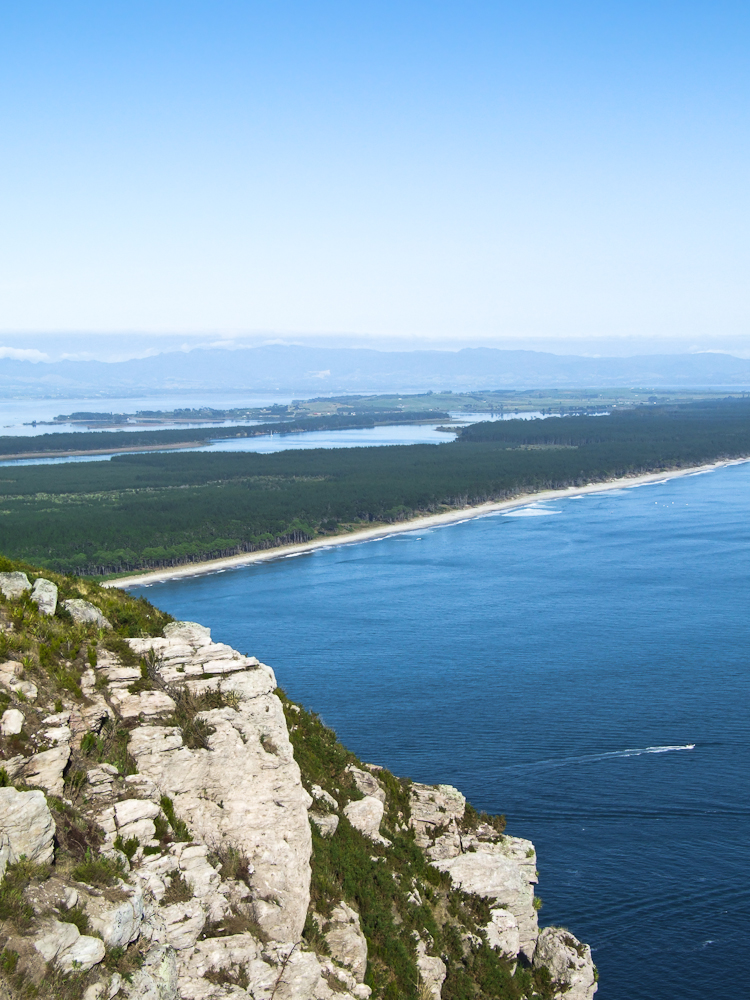
- Matakana Island as seen from the top of Mount Maunganui
- Interactive map of Matakana Island

Geography
- Location: Bay of Plenty Region
- Coordinates: 37°35′S 176°05′E
- Total islands: 5
- Area: 64.56 km^{2} (24.93 sq mi)
- Length: 20 km (12 mi)
- Width: 3 km (1.9 mi)
- Highest elevation: 18 m (59 ft)

Administration
- New Zealand
- Territorial authority: Western Bay of Plenty District
- Ward: Waihi Beach/Katikati
- Electorates: Coromandel; Waiariki (Māori)

Demographics
- Population: 320 (June 2025)
- Pop. density: 5.0/km^{2} (12.9/sq mi)
- Ethnic groups: 95.1% Māori; 13.1% European; 1.6% Other Pacific Islanders

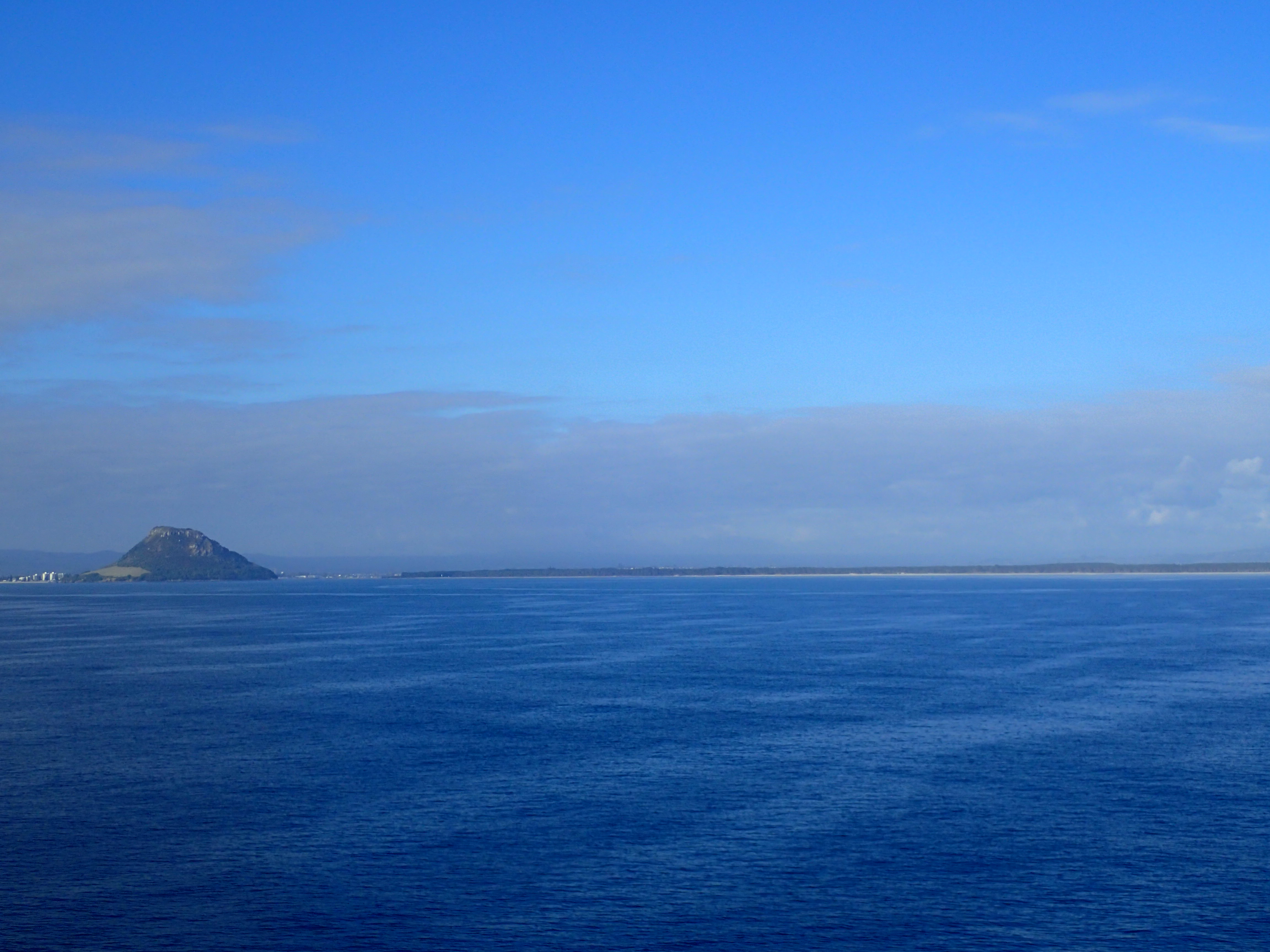
Matakana Island from the North

Matakana Island is located in the western Bay of Plenty in New Zealand's North Island. A long, flat barrier island, it is 20 kilometres (12 mi) in length but rarely more than 3 kilometres (1.9 mi) wide. The island has been continuously populated for centuries by Māori tribes that are mostly associated with Ngāi Te Rangi. The island is one of the few majority Māori-speaking places in New Zealand, with 56.9% of the population being able to speak Māori as of the 2023 census.

The island has two distinct parts: 5,000 acres (2,023 ha) of farm and orchard land on the inner harbour, (where most of the population lives) and 10,000 acres (4,047 ha) of forest-covered coastal land exposed to the Pacific Ocean. A smaller island, Rangiwaea Island, is located just offshore from Matakana's southern coast.

== History and culture ==
=== Recent history ===
19th Century: Of the 290,000 acres the Crown seized in the Tauranga region in 1865, 240,000 acres were returned to Māori between 1865–1886. The confiscated 50,000 acres did not include Matakana Island. Matakana Island is 15,000 acres. The 5000 acre western side of the island (farmland part) was purchased by Whitaker and Russell between 1869-1873. Whitaker and Russell then sold that 5000 acres on 2 April 1874 to the crown who then gave it back for no cost to the same Maori who had previously sold it. The coastal sand dunes of 10,000 acres were purchased by William Daldy of Auckland (1816 – 5 October 1903). A certificate of title under the Land Transfer Act 1870 was issued to Daldy on 3 August 1878. That transaction relates to the Wiakoura, Oturoa, Paretata, Omanuwhiri, Ohinetama, Wairaka, Pukekahu, Okotare and Hori Tupaea's Pa blocks.

20th Century: Between 1993 and 1999 the ownership of Matakana Island's 10,000 acres (4,047 ha) forest and freehold land was in dispute. The case Arklow Investments Limited and Christopher Wingate v I.D. MacLean and others, (UKPC 51) was appealed from the New Zealand Court of Appeal to the Judicial Committee of the Privy Council in London.

=== Marae ===
Matakana Island has three marae affiliated with Ngāi Te Rangi hapū:

- Kutaroa Marae and its Tauaiti meeting house are affiliated with Ngāti Tauaiti.
- Opureora Marae and its Tuwhiwhia meeting house are affiliated with Ngāi Tuwhiwhia and Ngāti Tauaiti.
- Te Rangihouhiri or Oruarahi Marae and its Te Rangihouhiri meeting house are affiliated with Ngāi Tamawhariua.

In October 2020, the Government committed $4,871,246 from the Provincial Growth Fund to upgrade Te Rangihouhiri Marae and 11 other Ngāti Awa marae, creating 23 jobs.

There are also two marae sites on neighbouring Rangiwaea Island belonging to Ngāi Te Rangi hapū:

- Rangiwaea Marae and its meeting house, Te Haka a Te Tupere, are a meeting place for Ngāi Tauwhao.
- Oponui Marae, which was dismantled between the 1980s and 2007, was traditionally a meeting place for Te Ngare.

== Demographics ==
Matakana and Rangiwaea islands cover 64.56 km^{2} (24.93 sq mi) and had an estimated population of 320 as of June 2025, with a population density of 5.0 people per km^{2}.

Historical population
| Year | Pop. | ±% p.a. |
|---|---|---|
| 2006 | 225 | — |
| 2013 | 255 | +1.80% |
| 2018 | 183 | −6.42% |
| 2023 | 306 | +10.83% |

Matakana and Rangiwaea islands had a population of 306 in the 2023 New Zealand census, an increase of 123 people (67.2%) since the 2018 census, and an increase of 51 people (20.0%) since the 2013 census. There were 165 males and 138 females in 132 dwellings. 2.9% of people identified as LGBTIQ+. The median age was 39.7 years (compared with 38.1 years nationally). There were 63 people (20.6%) aged under 15 years, 45 (14.7%) aged 15 to 29, 141 (46.1%) aged 30 to 64, and 57 (18.6%) aged 65 or older.

People could identify as more than one ethnicity. The results were 23.5% European (Pākehā), 93.1% Māori, 2.0% Pasifika, 2.9% Asian, and 2.0% other, which includes people giving their ethnicity as "New Zealander". English was spoken by 96.1%, and Māori by 56.9%. No language could be spoken by 2.0% (e.g. too young to talk). New Zealand Sign Language was known by 1.0%. The percentage of people born overseas was 4.9, compared with 28.8% nationally.

Religious affiliations were 31.4% Christian, 25.5% Māori religious beliefs, 1.0% New Age, and 1.0% other religions. People who answered that they had no religion were 36.3%, and 5.9% of people did not answer the census question.

Of those at least 15 years old, 30 (12.3%) people had a bachelor's or higher degree, 138 (56.8%) had a post-high school certificate or diploma, and 69 (28.4%) people exclusively held high school qualifications. The median income was $23,100, compared with $41,500 nationally. 3 people (1.2%) earned over $100,000 compared to 12.1% nationally. The employment status of those at least 15 was 84 (34.6%) full-time, 48 (19.8%) part-time, and 12 (4.9%) unemployed.

== Geography ==
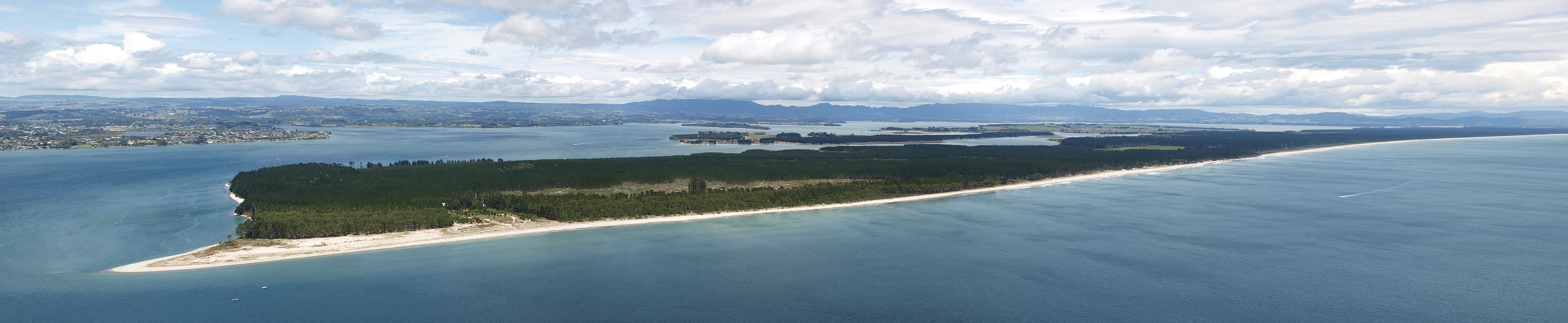
Matakana Island and Tauranga Harbour, Bay of Plenty, New Zealand - View from Mauao (Mount Maunganui)

The island protects the entrance to the Tauranga harbour and stretches from Bowentown to Mount Maunganui. Matakana Island is largely covered with pine trees although some land is cleared for the residents. Matakana Island has a relatively small population density of 4.2, though still more than the West Coast(1.3 as of the 2006 Census). The island is the third largest by area associated with the North Island, or the fifteenth largest within New Zealand waters.

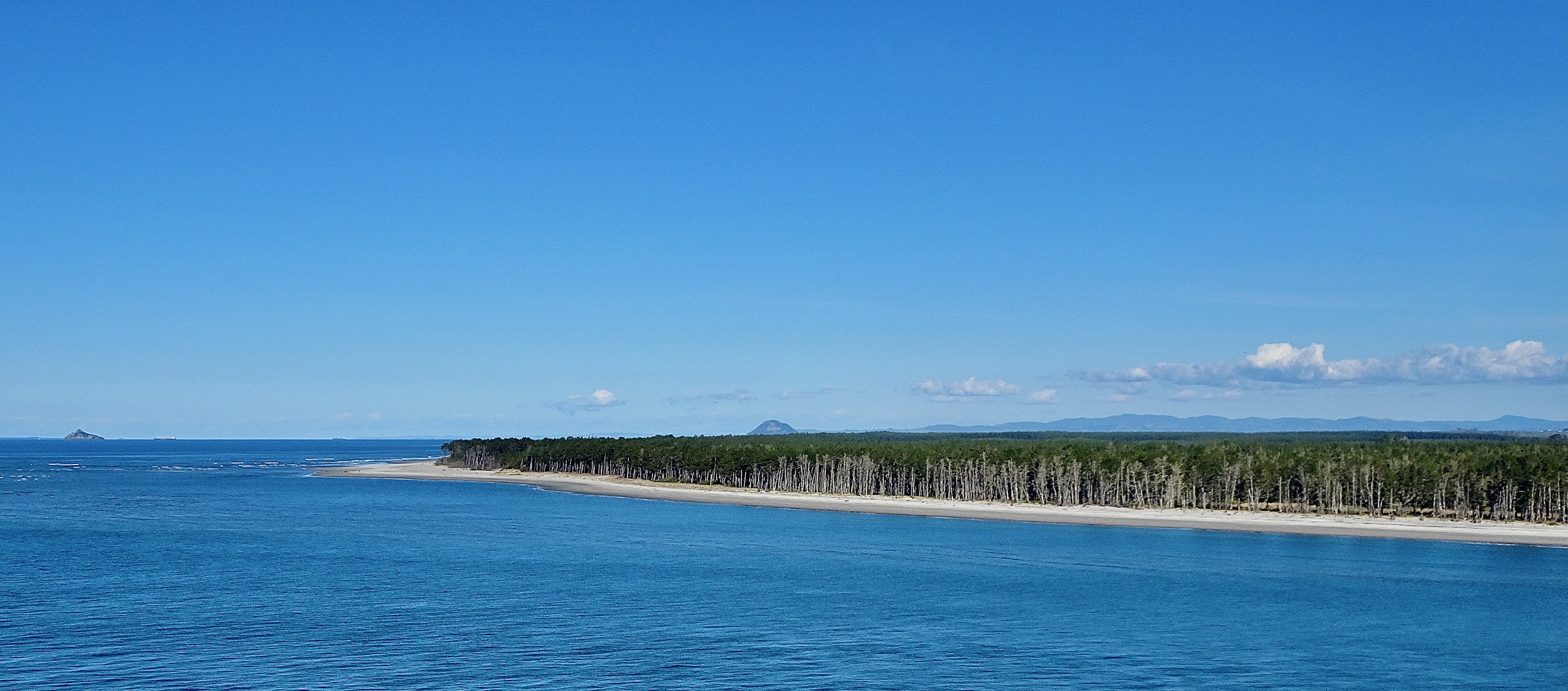
Northern Matakana from Bowentown. Mount Maunganui is centre background

The island's long, white sandy beach is popular with surfers. Surfers can either catch a water taxi from Mount Maunganui or paddle to the island across the mouth of Tauranga Harbour (depending on weather conditions). Matakana's surf side is a nesting site for a large number of sea birds, including the endangered New Zealand dotterel. In 2007, the New Zealand Fisheries Management Research Database recorded and estimated that there were 325 sting rays inhabiting the estuarial waters between Matakana Island and Rangiwaea Island.

=== Rangiwaea Island ===
Rangiwaea Island is off the south east coast of Matakana Island. It is low lying, over 3 km (1.9 mi) long and rises to 19 m (62 ft), with low cliffs in places. Like Matakana, the land ownership history during colonisation is unclear, but confiscated land was returned in 1886. The main products on the island are kiwifruit, avocado, timber and cattle. Other nearby, smaller islands are Tahunamanu, Motungaio and Motutangaroa Islet.

== Education ==
Te Kura o Te Moutere o Matakana is a co-educational Māori language immersion state primary school for Year 1 to 8 students, with a roll of 30 as of July 2026.

Te Kotukutuku School House opened in 1897 and provided education for over 50 years. It is now a Category 1 Historic Place. The school was extant in 1959 and 1965.

== See also ==
- List of islands of New Zealand
