= Ngāi Te Rangi =

Māori iwi (tribe) in Aotearoa New Zealand

- Iwi (tribe) in Māoridom
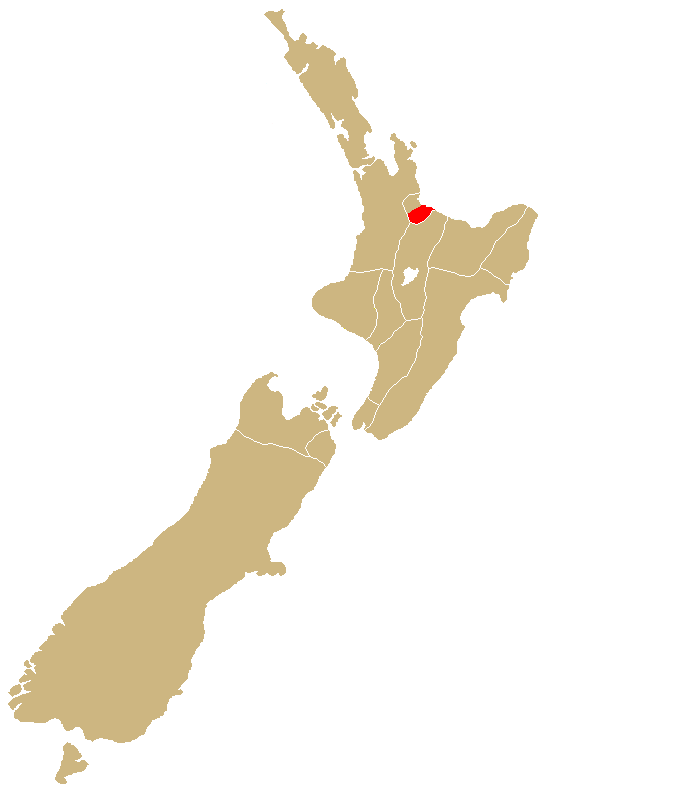
- Rohe (region): Tauranga
- Waka (canoe): Mātaatua
- Population: 12,924 (2013)
- Website: www.ngaiterangi.org.nz

Ngāi Te Rangi or Ngāiterangi is a Māori iwi, based in Tauranga, New Zealand. Its rohe (tribal area) extends to Mayor Island / Tūhua and Bowentown in the north, to the Kaimai Range in the west, south of Te Puke and to Maketu in the east.

Ngāi Te Rangi is part of the Tauranga Moana iwi group, which also includes Ngāti Pūkenga and Ngāti Ranginui. The three iwi all consider Mauao (Mount Maunganui) sacred and share many things in common with one another. Collectively, the iwi are seeking compensation from the New Zealand Government for their losses from the New Zealand Wars but are yet to seek a settlement.

== History ==
The iwi descends from Toroa, captain of the Mataatua canoe, which travelled to Aotearoa from Hawaiki, through his great-grandson Awanuiarangi, the ancestor of Ngati Awa.

=== Te Heke o Te Rangihouhiri ===
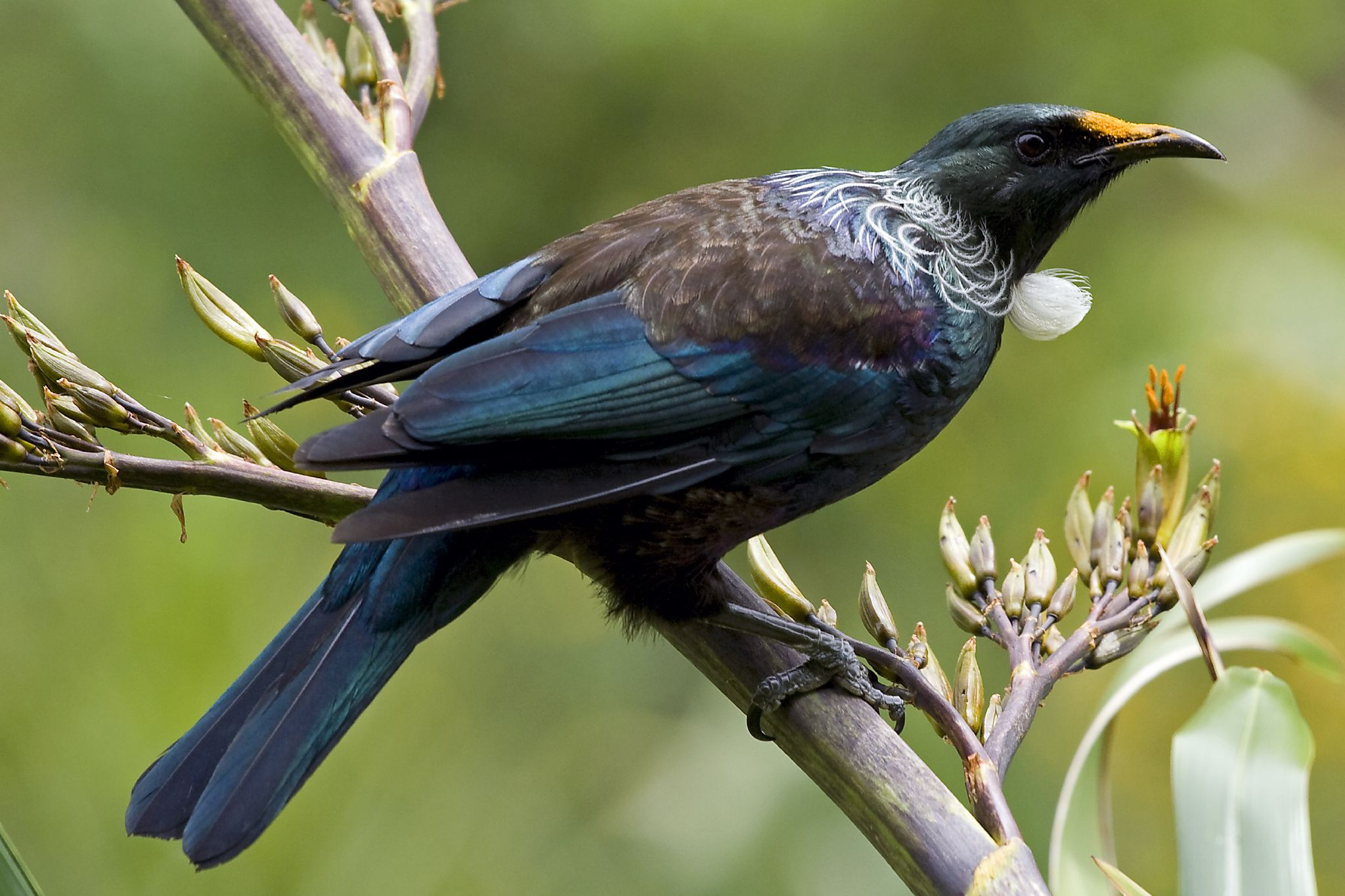
Tūī

In the time of Awanui's son, Rongotangiawa, Ngāti Awa was based at Tawhitirahi pā next to the Kukumoa stream, west of Opotiki. Kahukino, one of the inhabitants of the pā, had a pet tūī, which could sing and talk on command. A visitor from Ngāti Hā asked for this tūī as a gift, but Kahukino refused, so Ngāti Hā attacked and drove Ngāti Awa out of the region. This began a long period of migration for the people, known as Te Heke o Te Rangihouhiri.

Rongomainohorangi led the people all the way to the East Cape, where they were given refuge by Te Waho-o-te-rangi of Ngai te Rangihokaia, who settled them on Te Whakaroa mountain on the Waimata River, where they were required to hunt birds and rats for him. Rongomainohorangi told the people moe iho, moe iho ia tatau ano, whakatupu ia a tatau kia tini (Marry into our own tribe and build up our numbers, that we may become numerous). The tribe grew and eventually Rangihouhiri became its leader. The growth of Ngāti Awa worried Waho-o-te-rangi and on his deathbed, he instructed his people to go to Ngāti Awa, with their weapons hidden, and to carry out a massacre on his signal. However, Rangihouhiri and his compatriot Irawharao had married members of the Ngāti Rongowhakaata hapū of Ngāi te Rangihokaia, through whom they learnt about Waho-o-te rangi's plan. They ambushed the attackers and defeated them, but agreed to leave the area.

Rangihouhiri led the people by sea to Te Kaha, where his uncle, Tamahape, murdered one of the local men, so they had to move on quickly. Finally, they settled at Hakuranui at Tōrere on the Bay of Plenty (northeast of their original home at Tawhitirahi). Tōrere was already inhabited by Ngāitai, who became hostile to Ngāti Awa, after Tongarewa, son of Awatope of Ngāti Awa killed Te Whanaoterangi of Ngāitai. Penu of Ngāitai led a war party against Ngāti Awa and killed a man called Tukoukou, while he was out sowing kūmara seeds. Two men from the Waitaha iwi of Te Arawa, called Pohu and Matauaua, happened to be travelling through Tōrere at the time and they were accused of stealing the Tukoukou's remains from a canoe where they had been being stored. They were forced to flee. Later, another man from Te Arawa, called Te Aoterangi, was shipwrecked in the area, so Maruāhaira's son-in-law, Taiwhakaea killed him in revenge for the theft of Tukoukou's remains. Tamateapaia also led a war party to attack Te Arawa at Pakotore, but was defeated.

The tribe carried on to Whakatane and Te Awa-a-te-Atua (near Matatā); they were again told to move on.

=== The conquest of Maketu ===
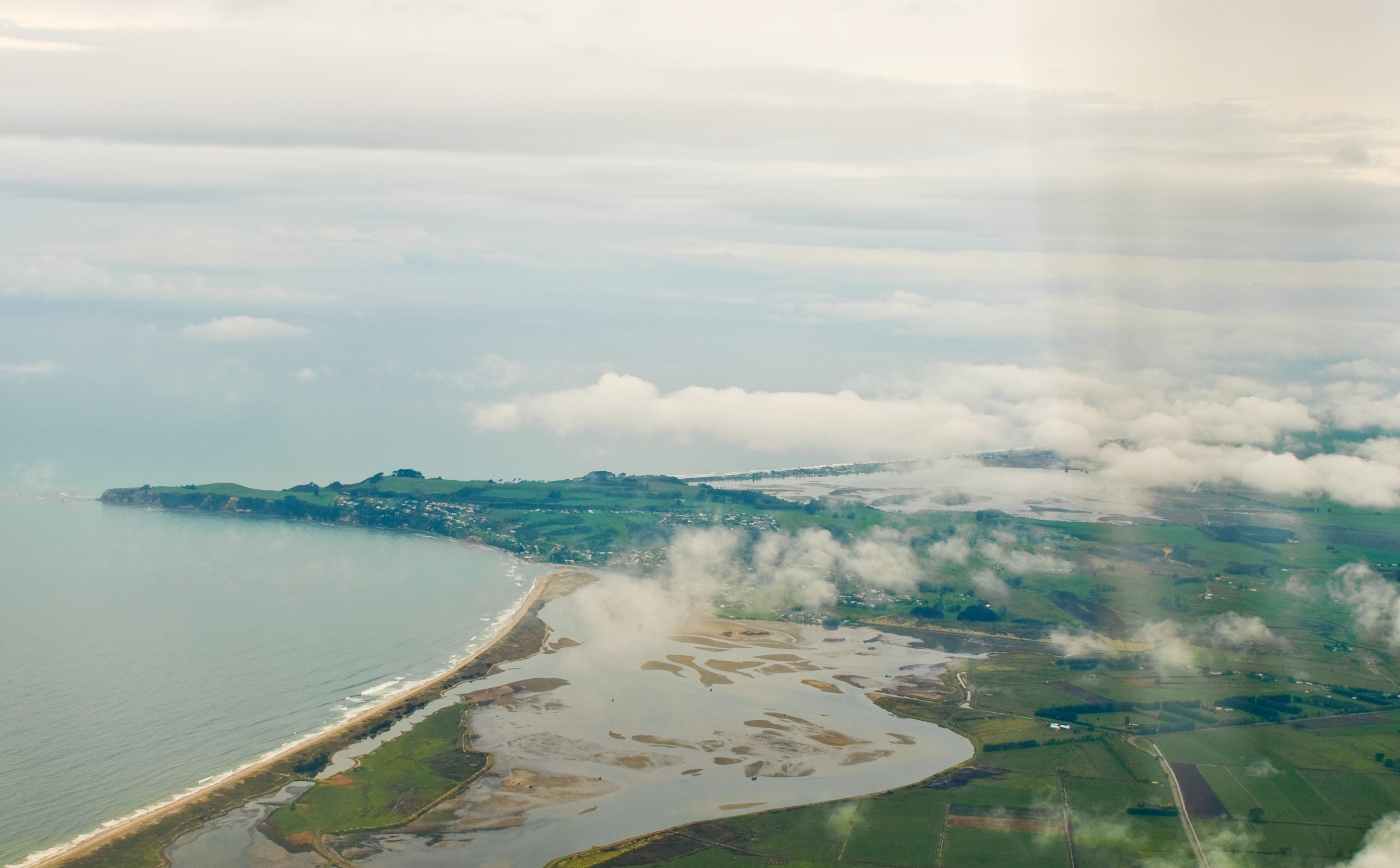
Maketu, seen from the west.

From here, Rangihouhiri decided to conquer Maketu from Te Arawa. The force set out to attack Maketu, pretending that they were on a fishing trip. As they approached Maketu, they came to a kūmara farm called Ohineahuru, where they encountered a woman called Punoho, daughter of Tatahau, whom they assaulted and killed. An Arawa war party assassinated the murderer in return.

Rangihouhiri attacked Tatahau's base at Pukemaire and killed him. Then, Rangihouhiri conquered Mokorangi, Mataitangaroa, and Huitaupoki. Tatahau's sons, Manu and Tiritiri, fled along the Whakapoukorero path to Otitoko, then to Waitangi, Muriwharau, Te Kahika, and Te Parapara, each of which Rangihouhiri captured. Finally, Manu and Tiritiri sought refuge in the Ngāti Moko fortress at Tauwharekiri. Rangihouhiri besieged this pā as well, but was unable to take it, so he gave up and turned back and consolidated his position at Maketu.

Manu and Tiritiri travelled to Waikato and convinced the powerful tohunga Kinonui to come to their aid. They also recruited allies from Tapuika and Waitaha. Meanwhile, Rangihouhiri went east to collect his own allies. The allies marched on Maketu and captured Herekaki and Pukemaire. Rangihouhiri's force fled to Owhara. The next day, Rangihouhiri, assisted by Ngāti Pukenga fought Tapuika, Waitaha, and Waikato at the Battle of Poporohuamea, on the edge of the Waihi estuary. Rangihouhiri's forces were victorious and his opponents were forced to flee to the west, but Rangihouhiri himself was killed. Nevertheless, Rangihouhiri's people had gained control of Maketu and they assumed the name Ngai te Rangi in his honour.

=== Wars with Te Arawa ===
After this, Ngāi Te Rangi led raids into the interior, demanding food from Te Arawa. Kuramaiterangi of Ngāi Te Rangi was killed by a lady of Tuhourangi at Pakotore for this, so Ngāi Te Rangi sacked Pakotore. Taiwere of Ngati Whakaue led Te Arawa, Tapuika, and Waitaha against Ngāi Te Rangi, who defeated and killed him at Kawa Swamp. Taiwere's brother Moekaha led a second army, but Ngāi Te Rangi defeated it at Kawa Swamp too and killed him as well. A third brother, Ariariterangi, pulled together an even larger coalition, incorporating Tapuika, Ngāti Hauā, and people from Hauraki. This army was totally defeated by Ngāi Te Rangi at Te Kakaho ford. Ariariterangi's son, Te Rorooterangi attacked Maketu and initially it seemed that he would be victorious, but a woman of Ngāi Te Rangi called Te Kurauuhirangi negotiated a peace, which was solidified through marriage alliances.

== Hapū and marae ==
- Ngā Pōtiki hapū is based at Mangatawa Marae and Tamapahore wharenui at Kairua, and at Tahuwhakatiki/Romai marae and Rongomainohorangi wharenui at Welcome Bay. Ngā Pōtiki a Tamapahore Trust governs the hapū separately from the rest of the iwi.
- Ngāi Tamawhariua hapū is based at Te Rangihouhiri/Oruarahi marae and Te Rangihouhiri wharenui on Matakana Island, and Te Rere a Tukahia marae and Tamawhariua wharenui at Katikati.
- Ngāi Tauwhao hapū is based at Otāwhiwhi marae and Tamaoho wharenui at Bowentown, and Rangiwaea marae and Te Haka a Te Tupere wharenui on Rangiwaea Island.
- Ngāi Tukairangi hapū is based at Hungahungatoroa/Whakahinga marea and Tāpuiti wharenui at Matapihi, and Whareroa marae and Rauru ki Tahi wharenui at Mt Maunganui.
- Ngāti Tauaiti hapū is based at Kutaroa marae and Tauaiti wharenui at Matakana Island, and Opureora marae and Tuwhiwhia wharenui at Matakana Island.
- Ngāti Tapu hapū is based at Waikari marae and Tapukino wharenui at Matapihi. Ngāti Tapu Hapū Tribal Committee represents the hapū under the Resource Management Act over its areas of interest, at Matapihi and Tauranga City Central Business District. As of 2016 the trust is based in Tauranga nd its chairman is Wiremu Hiamoe.
- Ngāti He hapū is based at Opopoti marae and Wairakewa wharenui at Maungatapu. Ngāti He Kaitiaki o te Taiao represents the hapū under the Resource Management Act over its areas of interest, at Mt Maunganui, Te Tumu Kaituna and Otanewainuku.
- Ngāi Tuwhiwhia hapū is based at Opureora marae and Tuwhiwhia wharenui on Matakana Island.
- Ngāti Kuku hapū (sub-tribe) is based at Whareroa marae and Rauru ki Tahi wharenui at Mt Maunganui.

== Governance ==
Te Runanga o Ngāi Te Rangi Iwi Trust is the mandated iwi organisation for Ngāi Te Rangi under the Māori Fisheries Act, an iwi aquaculture organisation under the Māori Commercial Aquaculture Claims Settlement Act, a Tūhono organisation, and represents Ngāi Te Rangi as an iwi authority under the Resource Management Act. It is a charitable trust, governed by one representative of each of the 11 marae. As of 2016, its chairman is Charlie Tawhiao, its chief executive officer is Brian Dickson, and it is based at Mt Maunganui.

Ngāi Te Rangi Settlement Trust is a governance entity for Ngāi Te Rangi recognised by the New Zealand Government following the iwi's settlement with the Crown on 14 December 2013. It is a common-law trust, governed by one trustee elected from 11 Hapū Community electorates, but not from Ngā Pōtiki. As of 2016, the trust chairman is Charlie Tawhiao, the trust chief executive is Paora Stanley and the trust is based in Tauranga.

Ngā Pōtiki a Tamapahore Trust is a governance entity for Ngā Pōtiki hapū, which has also been recognised by the Government since the iwi's settlement with the Crown. It is also a common-law trust and is governed by five trustees elected by registered members of Ngā Pōtiki. As of 2016, its acting chairperson is Victoria Kingi and it is based in Papamoa.

The iwi has interests in the territories of Bay of Plenty Regional Council, Western Bay of Plenty District Council and Tauranga City Council.

== Media ==
Moana Radio is the radio station of Ngāi Te Rangi and the other Tauranga Moana iwi. It is available on 1440 AM and 98.2 FM in Tauranga and across the Bay of Plenty. Moana previously operated youth-oriented urban contemporary Tahi FM between 2003 and late 2011.

== Notable Ngāi Te Rangi ==
- Simone Kessell, actress
- Hōri Ngātai, warrior, farmer and orator
- Matthew Tukaki, Chairman, the National Maori Authority, Executive Director of the New Zealand Maori Council, Chairman of the Ministry of Children Ministerial Advisory Board
- Teeks, musician
- Pene Taka Tuaia, warrior, military engineer and land protester
- Stan Walker, musician, actor and personality
- Chelsea Winstanley, film producer

== Bibliography ==
- Stafford, D.M. (1967). Te Arawa: A History of the Arawa People. Rotorua, New Zealand: A.H. & A.W. Reed.
- Steedman, J.A.W. (1984). Ngā Ohaaki o ngā Whānau o Tauranga Moana: Māori History and Genealogy of the Bay of Plenty.
