= Tauranga Harbour =

Natural harbour in New Zealand

Coordinates: 37°38′S 176°05′E

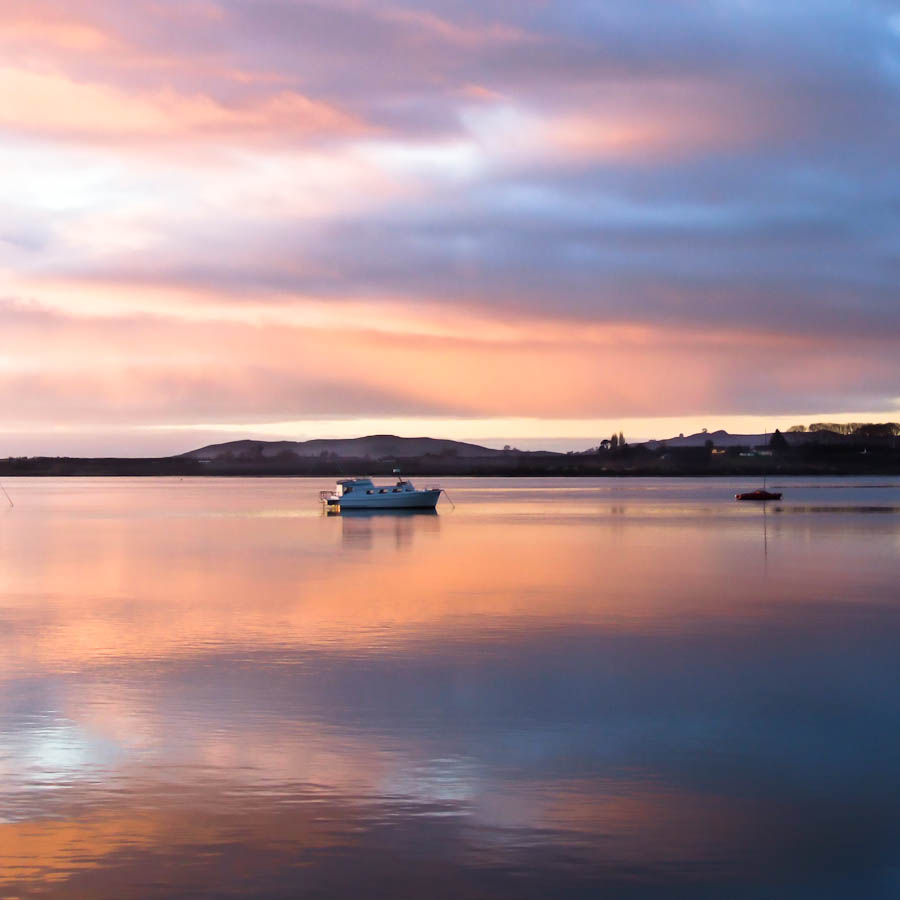
Sunrise over Tauranga harbour

Tauranga Harbour is the natural tidal harbour that surrounds Tauranga CBD and the Mount Maunganui area of Tauranga, New Zealand, and which flows into the Pacific Ocean at Mount Maunganui. The harbour is effectively two flooded river systems separated from the Pacific Ocean by Matakana Island.

The harbour is a large tidal estuary with an area of some 200-km^{2} and has a tidal range of up to 1.98m. Approximately 290,000,000 tonnes of water flow through the entrances at each tidal change. This tidal flow can generate currents of up to 7 knots within the entrance channels.

The Port of Tauranga is located in the harbour and container ships and cruise ships use the harbour's waters. The Tauranga harbour entrance is the shipping channel to the Port of Tauranga, New Zealand’s largest export port. Shipping movements can take place at any time, day or night, through the main channels.

The harbour is used for many recreational activities, including water skiing, kite surfing, jet skiing, boating, swimming, diving and fishing.

== See also ==
- Tauranga Living Seawall
