= List of places called Fairview in the United States =

According to the National League of Cities, there are 288 communities in the United States named Fairview, including incorporated places, unincorporated places, housing developments that are not yet incorporated places, and neighborhoods within incorporated places. Also there are houses or other buildings named Fairview. These include:

== Alabama ==
- Fairview, Alabama

== California ==
- Fairview, California

== Delaware ==
- Fairview (Delaware City, Delaware), listed on the National Register of Historic Places
- Fairview (Middletown, Delaware), listed on the National Register of Historic Places
- Fairview (Odessa, Delaware, 1733), listed on the National Register of Historic Places
- Fairview (Odessa, Delaware, 1850), listed on the National Register of Historic Places

== Georgia ==
- Fairview, Georgia

== Illinois ==
- Fairview, Illinois

== Indiana ==
- Fairview, Indiana

== Iowa ==
- Fairview, Iowa

== Kansas ==
- Fairview, Kansas

== Kentucky ==
- Fairview, Christian County, Kentucky, on the border of Todd and Christian Counties
- Fairview, Kenton County, Kentucky
- Fairview (Harrodsburg, Kentucky), listed on the National Register of Historic Places listings in Mercer County, Kentucky
- Fairview, Lyon County, Kentucky

== Louisiana ==
- Fairview, Louisiana, Unincorporated community in Concordia Parish

== Maryland ==
- Fairview, Anne Arundel County, Maryland
- Fairview (Easton, Maryland), listed on the National Register of Historic Places listings in Talbot County, Maryland
- Fairview, Frederick County, Maryland
- Fairview, Garrett County, Maryland
- Fairview, Harford County, Maryland
- Fairview, Montgomery County, Maryland
- Fairview, Washington County, Maryland

== Massachusetts ==
- Fairview, a community in Chicopee, Massachusetts

== Michigan ==
- Fairview, Michigan

== Minnesota ==
- Fairview Township, Minnesota (disambiguation)

== Missouri ==
- Fairview, Missouri
- Fairview, Lincoln County, Missouri
- Fairview, Nodaway County, Missouri
- Fairview, Texas County, Missouri

== Montana ==
- Fairview, Montana

== Nebraska ==
- Fairview Township, Holt County, Nebraska
- William Jennings Bryan House, also known as Fairview, a U.S. National Historic Landmark in Lincoln, Nebraska

== Nevada ==
- Fairview, Nevada

== New Jersey ==
- Fairview, Bergen County, New Jersey
- Fairview, Delran, New Jersey in Burlington County
- Fairview, Medford, New Jersey in Burlington County
- Fairview, Camden, Camden County, New Jersey
- Fairview, New Jersey in Gloucester County
- Fairview, Monmouth County, New Jersey

== New York ==
- Fairview, Dutchess County, New York
- Fairview, Westchester County, New York

== North Carolina ==
- Fairview, Buncombe County, North Carolina
- Fairview, Union County, North Carolina

== Ohio ==
- Fairview, Ohio
- Fairview, Adams County, Ohio

== Oklahoma ==
- Fairview, Oklahoma

== Oregon ==
- Fairview, Oregon
- Fairview, Tillamook County, Oregon, an unincorporated community

== Pennsylvania ==
- Fairview, Butler County, Pennsylvania, a borough
- Fairview, Erie County, Pennsylvania, a census-designated place
- Fairview, Franklin County, Pennsylvania, an unincorporated community
- Fairview Lake (Pennsylvania), a natural lake in Palmyra Township, Pike County
- Fairview Township, Pennsylvania (disambiguation)
- Fairview Village, Pennsylvania

== South Dakota ==
- Fairview, South Dakota

== Tennessee ==
- Fairview, Tennessee, a small town in Williamson County
- Fairview, Bradley County, Tennessee
- Fairview, Tennessee, an unincorporated community in Scott County, Tennessee
- Fairview, Wayne County, Tennessee, an unincorporated community

== Texas ==
- Fairview, Texas
- William J. Bryce House, known as Fairview, in Fort Worth, Texas

== Utah ==
- Fairview, Utah

== Virginia ==
- Fairview (Amherst, Virginia), listed on the National Register of Historic Places
- Fairview (Spotsylvania County, Virginia), listed on the National Register of Historic Places

== West Virginia ==
- Fairview, West Virginia
- Fairview (Burlington, West Virginia), listed on the National Register of Historic Places

== Wisconsin ==
- Fairview, Wisconsin

== Wyoming ==
- Fairview, Wyoming

== Other places that include Fairview in name ==
- Fairview Heights, Illinois
- Fairview Natural Area, a protected area in Montrose County, Colorado
- Fairview Plantation, Collington, Maryland
- Fairview Presbyterian Church (disambiguation)
- Fairview Training Center, a former state-run institution in Salem, Oregon
- Fairview Dome

== Fictional places ==
- Fairview, the setting of the TV show, Desperate Housewives

== See also ==
- Fairview (disambiguation)
