= Fairview =

Fairview may refer to:

== Arts and media ==
- Fairview (play), Pulitzer prize-winning 2018 play by Jackie Sibblies Drury
- Fairview (TV series), an adult animated TV series executive produced by Stephen Colbert
- Fairview, the fictional setting of the TV show, Desperate Housewives
- Fairview Entertainment, a production company founded by Jon Favreau

== Houses and homes ==
- Fairview, Maleny, Queensland, Australia, a heritage-listed house
- William Jennings Bryan House (Lincoln, Nebraska), U.S., also known as Fairview
- Fairview (Delaware City, Delaware), U.S.
- Fairview (Odessa, Delaware, 1773), U.S.
- Fairview (Odessa, Delaware, 1850), U.S.
- Fairview (Amherst, Virginia), U.S.
- Fairview (Spotsylvania County, Virginia), U.S.
- Fairview (Burlington, West Virginia), U.S.
- Fair View School, a historic building in Pope County, Arkansas, U.S.

== Other places ==
=== Canada ===
==== Alberta ====
- Fairview, Alberta, a town in northern Alberta
- Fairview, Alberta (hamlet), in southern Alberta
- Fairview, Calgary, a neighbourhood in the City of Calgary
- Fairview Mountain (Alberta), a mountain in Banff National Park
- Municipal District of Fairview No. 136, a municipal district surrounding the Town of Fairview in northern Alberta

==== Other places in Canada ====
- Fairview, British Columbia
- Fairview, Vancouver, British Columbia
- Fairview, Nova Scotia
- Fairview, Kenyon Township, North Glengarry, Ontario
- Fairview Mall, a shopping mall in St. Catharines, Ontario, Canada

=== New Zealand ===
- Fairview, Bay of Plenty, a settlement near Katikati
- Fairview, New Zealand, a locality near Timaru
- Fairview Heights, New Zealand, a suburb of Auckland
- Fairview Downs, a suburb of Hamilton

=== South Africa ===
- Fairview, Barkly East, Eastern Cape
- Fairview, Gauteng, Johannesburg
- Fairview, Mossel Bay, Western Cape

=== United States ===
- List of places called Fairview in the United States

=== Other countries ===
- Fairview, Dublin, Ireland, an inner suburb
- Fairview, Quezon City, Philippines
- Fairview, Cheltenham, UK

== Other uses ==
- Fairview (surveillance program), an American surveillance program
- Fairview Wine and Cheese, a South African business
- USS Fairview (EPCER-850), a ship of the U.S. Navy decommissioned in 1968

== See also ==
- Fairview Park (disambiguation)
- Fairview School (disambiguation)
- Fairview Township (disambiguation)
- Fairview Road (disambiguation)
- Fairview Drive (disambiguation)
