= Fairview, Maryland =

Fairview, Maryland may refer to the following places in the U.S. state of Maryland:

- Fairview, Anne Arundel County, Maryland
- Fairview, Frederick County, Maryland
- Fairview, Garrett County, Maryland
- Fairview, Harford County, Maryland
- Fairview, Montgomery County, Maryland
- Fairview, Washington County, Maryland
