= Fairview, New Jersey (disambiguation) =

Fairview is the name of some places in the U.S. state of New Jersey:

- Fairview, Bergen County, New Jersey
- Fairview, Delran, New Jersey in Burlington County
- Fairview, Medford, New Jersey in Burlington County
- Fairview, Camden, Camden County, New Jersey
- Fairview, Gloucester County, New Jersey
- Fairview, Monmouth County, New Jersey

== See also ==
- Fairview (disambiguation)
