= Diamond State Base Ball Club =

Information
- League: Mid-Atlantic Vintage Base Ball League (Federal Conference)
- Location: Delaware City, Delaware
- Ballpark: Fort DuPont Ball Field, Fort DuPont State Park, Sussex Avenue
- Founded: 2008
- Nickname(s): Blue & Black, Diamond States
- 2014 season: 23–12
- Colors: Navy blue and black
- Ownership: Unincorporated club
- Management: Jeff Kabacinski (president); Matthew Bartnicki (vice president); Chris Goering (secretary & treasurer)

The Diamond State Base Ball Club is a baseball team that played in Wilmington, Delaware, in the mid-1860s through the early 1870s. It was revived as a vintage base ball team in 2008 in Delaware City, Delaware.

== History ==
At the conclusion of the Civil War, the sport of baseball (or base ball, as it was spelled at the time) experienced a tremendous explosion in interest. New ball clubs began to form in every city and town in the country almost as soon at the war was settled. Interest in base ball certainly was no different in the burgeoning industrial city of Wilmington, Delaware.

On October 2, 1865, a group of Wilmington's leading businessmen and attorneys met to discuss the formation of a new amateur club to represent its city. Founders of the club, called the Diamond State Base Ball Club, included attorneys Levi C. Bird, Anthony Higgins, Benjamin Nields and several others.

The ball club rented a home ball field for its practice and games, which was located at Delaware Avenue and Adams Street, adjacent to the Wilmington & Brandywine Cemetery, at what was then the edge of the Wilmington's city limits.

Diamond State Base Ball Club hastily arranged its first ever match, which was played at its home field on October 7, 1865 against a student team from nearby St. Mary's College. Rival base ball clubs soon formed all around the city and state, though none would prove to be as well-organized or competitively strong as the Diamond State nine. They went on to dominate play in Delaware throughout the remainder of the 1860s, winning several state championships during that period.

Interest in the Diamond State Base Ball Club began to wane by 1870, as other Delaware clubs rose to challenge them. The club disbanded in the early years of the decade. A brief attempt was made to revive the club in the mid-1870s to little avail.

== Famous alumni ==
The most accomplished Diamond State ball player was Fergy Malone, who led the club to the Delaware state championship during the 1866 seasons. Malone is widely recognized as a baseball pioneer and one of the finest catchers of the 19th century.

A player for Diamond State in his own right, Anthony Higgins found greater acclaim away from baseball, as a member of the bench and later as a Delaware senator.

== Modern club ==
The Diamond State Base Ball Club was revived and reformed in October 2008 as a vintage base ball club. The modern day ball club bases its uniform colors and design on the uniforms worn by its 1860s predecessor. Also in keeping with the tradition of the original Diamond State club, the modern team plays all of its games according to baseball rules of the mid-1860s to early 1870s.

The Diamond State Base Ball Club conducted its first practice on October 18, 2008 at Rockford Park in Wilmington, Delaware. In April 2009, the reformed club began playing matches at its regular home field at Fort DuPont State Park in Delaware City, Delaware. Diamond State also has played home matches elsewhere around Delaware and the region, including at Fort Delaware State Park on Pea Patch Island, on the Legislative Green in Dover, Delaware, on the grounds of Twin Lakes Brewing Company in Greenville, Delaware, Hagley Museum in Wilmington, Delaware, Rockford Park in Wilmington, Delaware, the Governor William H. H. Ross Mansion in Seaford, Delaware, the Port Penn Area Historical Society in Port Penn, Delaware, and in Riverview Beach Park in Pennsville, New Jersey.

Diamond State Base Ball Club is a founding member of the Mid Atlantic Vintage Base Ball League.

The Diamond States won just 1 game against 15 losses in their 2009 season, then improved to 12 wins against 18 losses in their 2010 season. Improvement continued in 2011, when they recorded 19 wins against 12 losses, and in 2012, notching 24 wins against just 8 losses, including a 16-game winning streak at one point. In 2013, the Diamond State Base Ball Club added a second nine, going by the Atlas of Delaware City. The purpose of the Atlas nine is to get more playing time for members of the Diamond State Club that typically do not play in games involving the first nine. The Atlas nine is a less competitive and more recreational match than the first nine of the Diamond State Club. In the inaugural season of the Atlas nine, 2013, the Diamond State Base Ball Club's first nine recorded 18 wins against 10 losses, including key wins in the Mid-Atlantic Vintage Base Ball League's post-season championship tournament (see below). The Atlas Nine played just four contests in their first season, winning once and losing three. In 2014, the Diamond State first nine recorded 23 wins against 12 losses, and the Atlas Nine recorded 1 win against 4 losses.

== Appearances in postseason events ==
In 2011, the Diamond State Base Ball Club hosted the Championship Tournament of the Mid-Atlantic Vintage Base Ball League on the Parade Grounds at Fort DuPont State Park. The Diamond States defeated the Cecil Base Ball Club of Chesapeake City, Maryland by a score of 10-4, advancing to the semi-finals, where they were defeated by a score of 6-5 in 11 innings by the Brooklyn Atlantics. The team then lost the consolation game to the Fair Play Base Ball Club of Talbot County, Maryland by a score of 14-7.

In 2013, the Diamond State Base Ball Club traveled to Harrington, Delaware to participate again in the Championship Tournament of the Mid-Atlantic Vintage Base Ball League. They began by defeating the Eclipse Base Ball Club of Elkton, Maryland by a score of 9-3. They again met the Brooklyn Atlantics in the semi-final round, this time defeating the Atlantics, 13-3. In the championship game, the Excelsior Base Ball Club of Milford, Delaware defeated the Diamond States by a score of 4-3.
