= Fairview Township, Pennsylvania =

Fairview Township is the name of some places in the U.S. state of Pennsylvania:

- Fairview Township, Butler County, Pennsylvania
- Fairview Township, Erie County, Pennsylvania
- Fairview Township, Luzerne County, Pennsylvania
- Fairview Township, Mercer County, Pennsylvania
- Fairview Township, York County, Pennsylvania

== See also ==
- Fairview, Pennsylvania (disambiguation)
- Fairfield Township, Pennsylvania (disambiguation)
- Fairhope Township, Somerset County, Pennsylvania
- Fairmount Township, Luzerne County, Pennsylvania
- Fairview Township (disambiguation)
