= Fairview, Pennsylvania =

Fairview, Pennsylvania may refer to:

- Fairview, Butler County, Pennsylvania, a borough
- Fairview, Erie County, Pennsylvania, a census-designated place
- Fairview, Franklin County, Pennsylvania, an unincorporated community
- Fairview, Mercer County, Pennsylvania

== See also ==
- West Fairview, Pennsylvania
- Fairview Township, Pennsylvania (disambiguation)
- Fairview (disambiguation)
