= River Plaza =

River Plaza may refer to:

- River Plaza (skyscraper)
- River Plaza, New Jersey
- Maritime Museum ferry wharf, formerly known as River Plaza
- Gardens of Trout River Plaza
- Riverfront Plaza, known prior to construction as River Plaza
