= Delaware City Historic District =

Historic district in Delaware, United States

- U.S. National Register of Historic Places
- U.S. Historic district
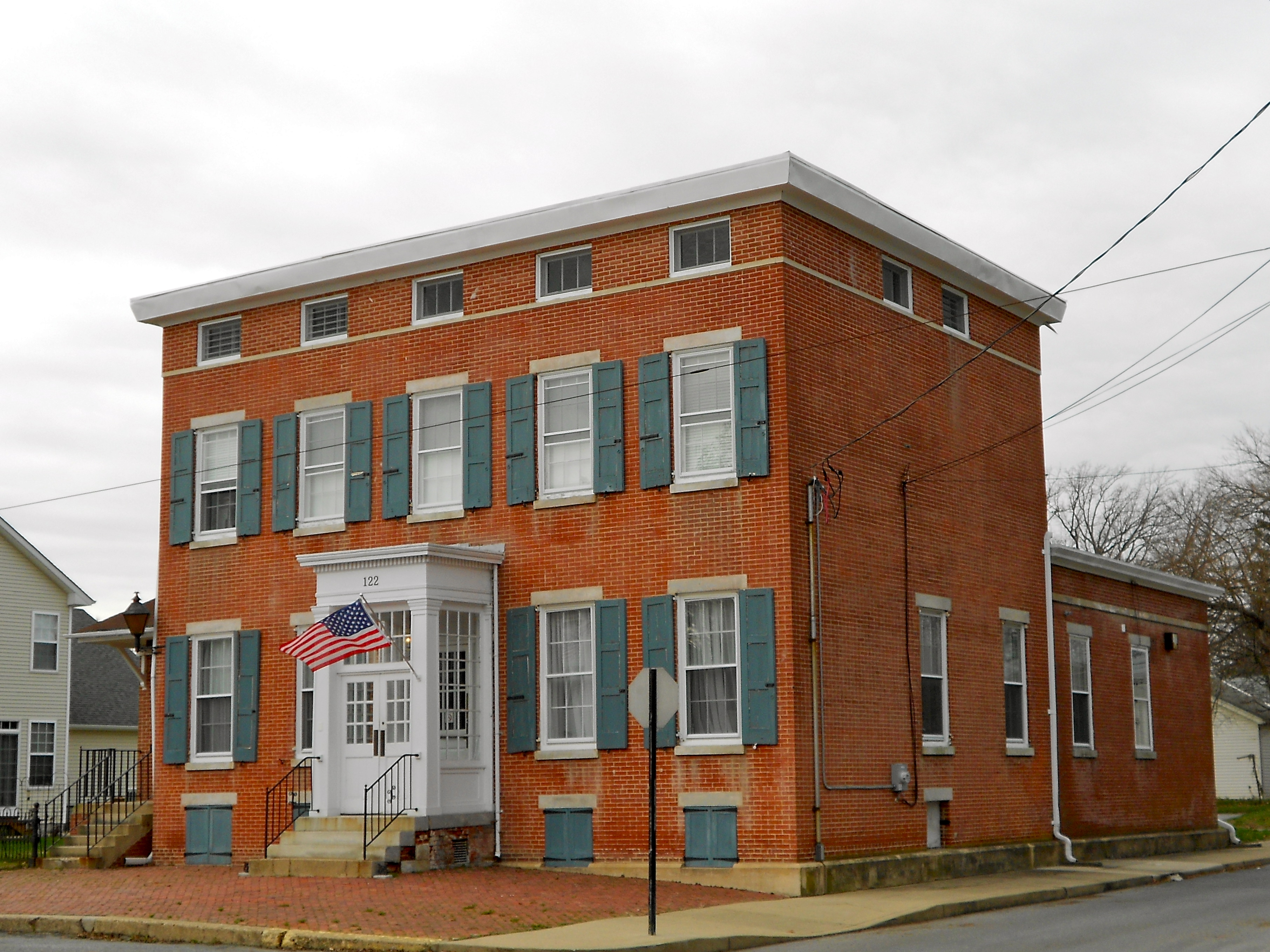
- House in the Delaware City Historic District, December 2011

- Location within Delaware Location within the United States
- Location: Roughly bounded by the Delaware River, Dragon Creek, DE 9, and the Delaware and Chesapeake Canals, Delaware City, Delaware
- Coordinates: 39°34′38″N 75°35′31″W
- Area: 68 acres (28 ha)
- Built: 1826
- Architectural style: Greek Revival, Italianate
- NRHP reference No.: 83003515
- Added to NRHP: December 15, 1983

Delaware City Historic District is a national historic district located at Delaware City, New Castle County, Delaware. It encompasses 204 contributing buildings and 1 contributing site in the town of Delaware City. The buildings were built between about 1826 and 1930. They are primarily residential buildings, with some commercial and institutional buildings including notable examples of the Greek Revival and Italianate styles. Notable buildings include the Delaware City Hotel (1828), Central Hotel (c. 1835), Christ Episcopal Church (1849) and Rectory (1870), Van Hekle House (1828), Delaware City Academy (1858), Delaware City Public School (1883), Dunlap/Worrell House (c. 1826), and First Presbyterian Church (c. 1835).

It was listed on the National Register of Historic Places in 1983.

== Gallery ==
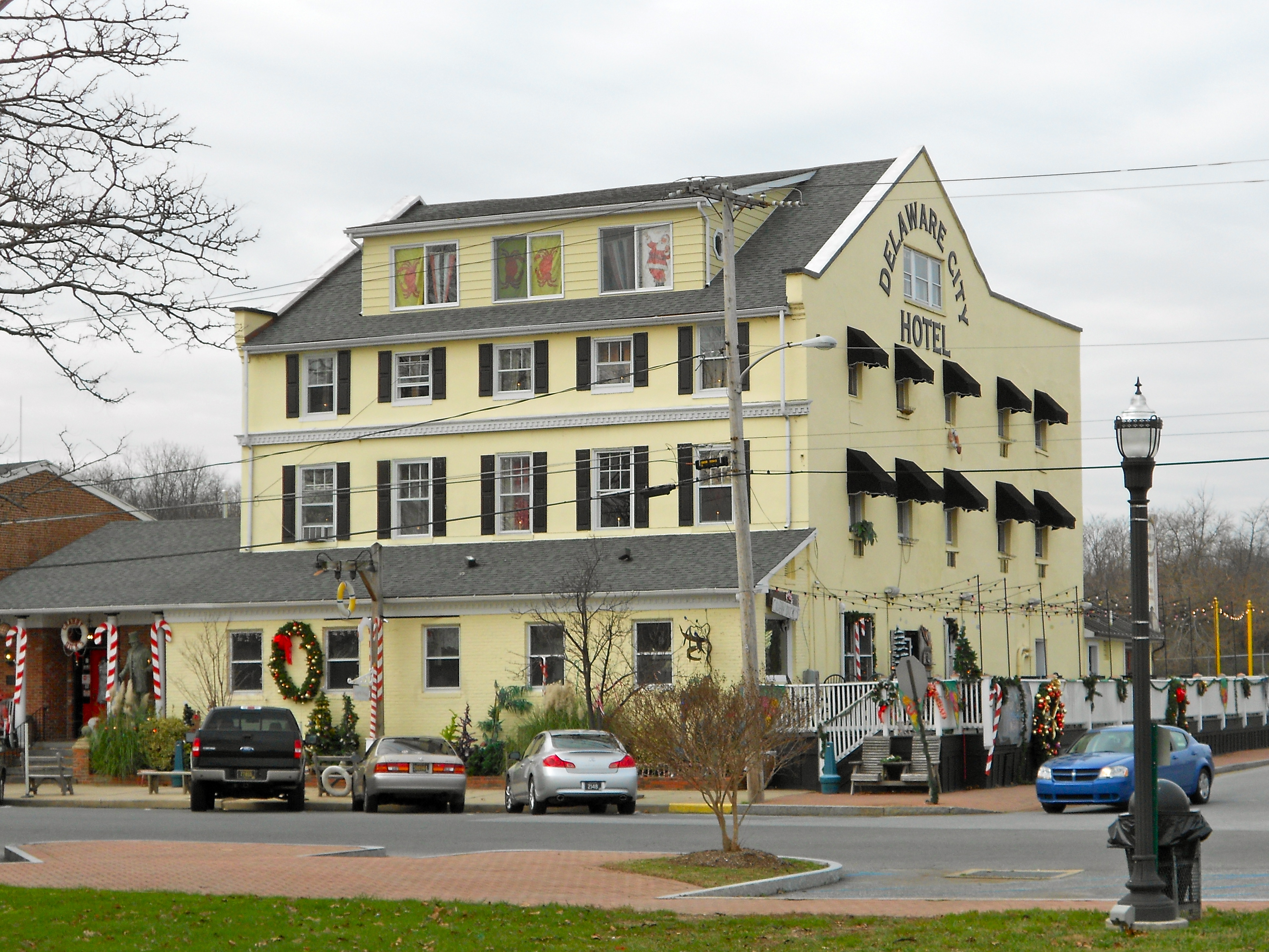
Delaware City Hotel, December 2011

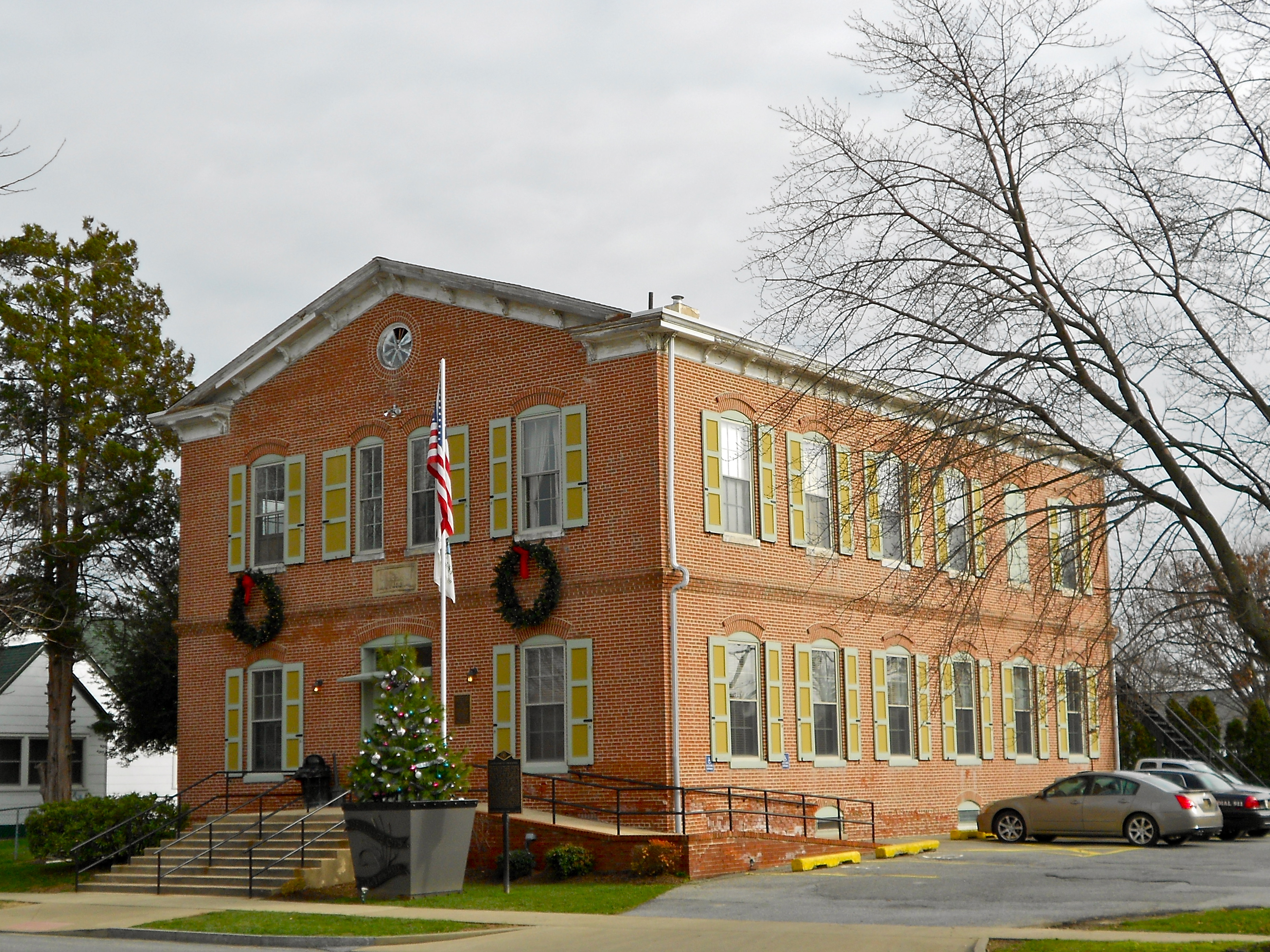
former Delaware City Public School, December 2011
