= Fairview Road =

Fairview Road may refer to:

== By country ==
=== Canada ===
- Fairview Road in Fairview, British Columbia

=== United Kingdom ===
- Fairview Road in Glengormley, County Antrim, Northern Ireland
- Fairview Road, location of part of the 1987 Hungerford massacre in Hungerford, Berkshire
- 153-159 Fairview Road, Cheltenham, Gloucestershire

=== United States ===
- Fairview Road, Penn Valley, Pennsylvania

== See also ==
- Fairview (disambiguation)
- Fairview Drive (disambiguation)
