= Aongatete =

Rural community in the Bay of Plenty, New Zealand

- Rural community
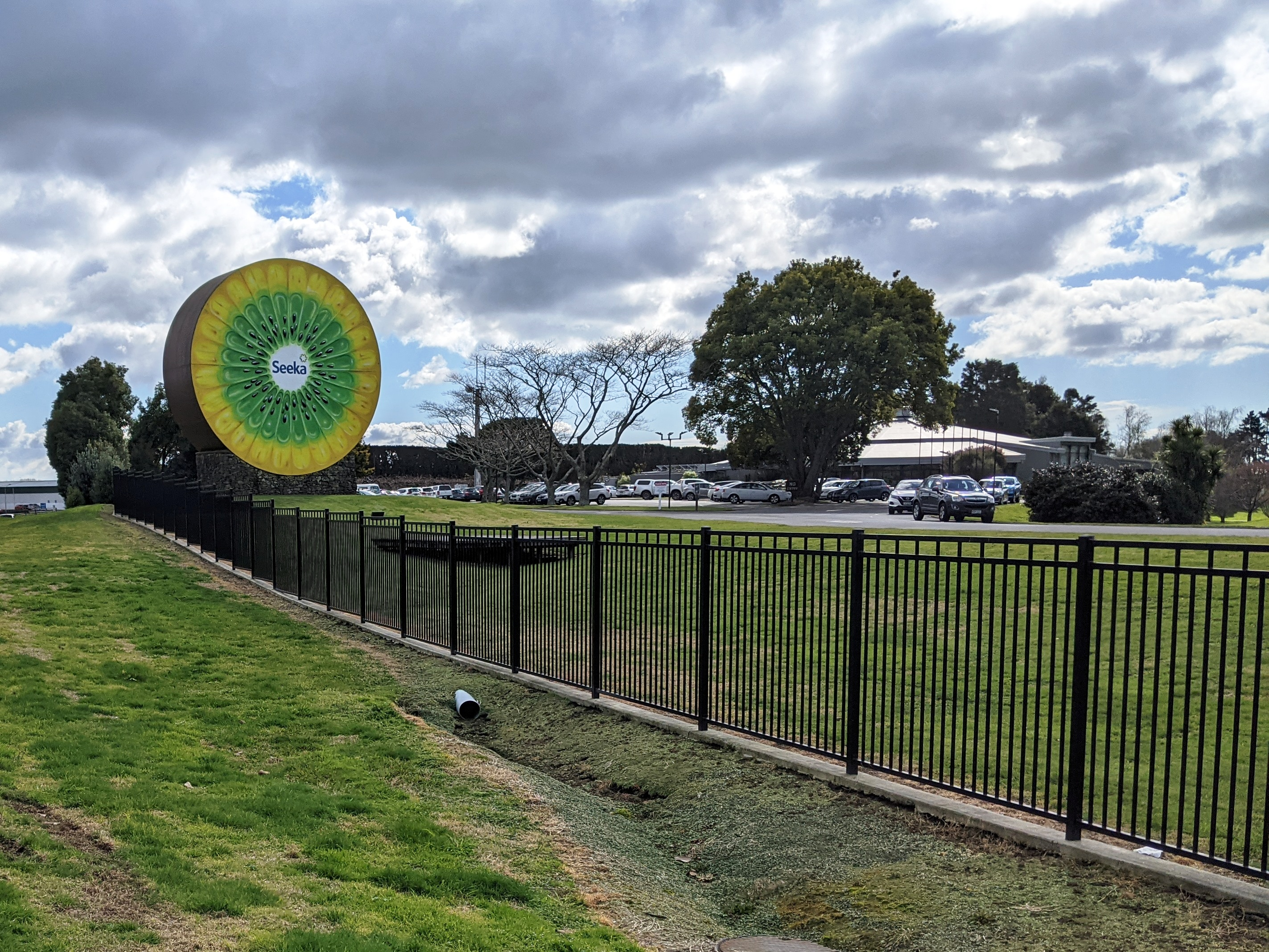
- Seeka Kiwifruit at Aongatete Coolstores
- Interactive map of Aongatete
- Coordinates: 37.608°S 175.943°E
- Country: New Zealand
- Region: Bay of Plenty
- Territorial authority: Western Bay of Plenty District
- Ward: Katikati-Waihi Beach
- Community: Katikati Community
- Electorates: Coromandel; Waiariki (Māori)

Government
  - Territorial Authority: Western Bay of Plenty District Council
  - Regional council: Bay of Plenty Regional Council
  - Mayor of Western Bay of Plenty: James Denyer
  - Coromandel MP: Scott Simpson
  - Waiariki MP: Rawiri Waititi
- Postcode(s): 3181

Aongatete is a settlement and rural community in the Western Bay of Plenty District and Bay of Plenty Region of New Zealand's North Island. It is located on State Highway 2, south of Katikati and north-west of Ōmokoroa. The landscape consists of a long valley descending into the Tauranga Harbour.

The local Kaimai Mamaku Conservation Park, managed by the Department of Conservation, including walks through puriri and kohekohe forest, along the Aongatete Stream, and to swimming holes. Ngai Tamawhariua are guardians of the 500 hectare native forest, and a Forest and Bird volunteer group helps maintain it. A restoration trust was established in 2006 to trap or poison pests like stoats, rats, cats and possums.

The Aongatete Lodge and Outdoor Education Centre, located in the forest, hosts school camps and events like the International Juggling Association Oceania Competition.

The settlement includes Aongatete Coolstores, a kiwifruit orcharding, packing and coolstore business. Seeka Limited, a produce company listed on the NZX, purchased the business for $25 million in March 2019.

Vodafone installed a cell tower at Aongatete in January 2014. Ultra fast broadband internet was introduced to Aongatete in December 2019.

During the 2020 COVID-19 lockdown, a local couple tried to cheer up the community with humorous displays featuring teddy bears.

== Demographics ==
Aongatete statistical area, which also includes Fairview, covers 164.37 km^{2} (63.46 sq mi) and had an estimated population of 3,600 as of June 2025, with a population density of 22 people per km^{2}.

Historical population
Year	Pop.	±% p.a.
2006	2,565	—
2013	2,724	+0.86%
2018	3,153	+2.97%
2023	3,519	+2.22%
The 2006 population is for a larger area of 184.80 km^{2}. Source:

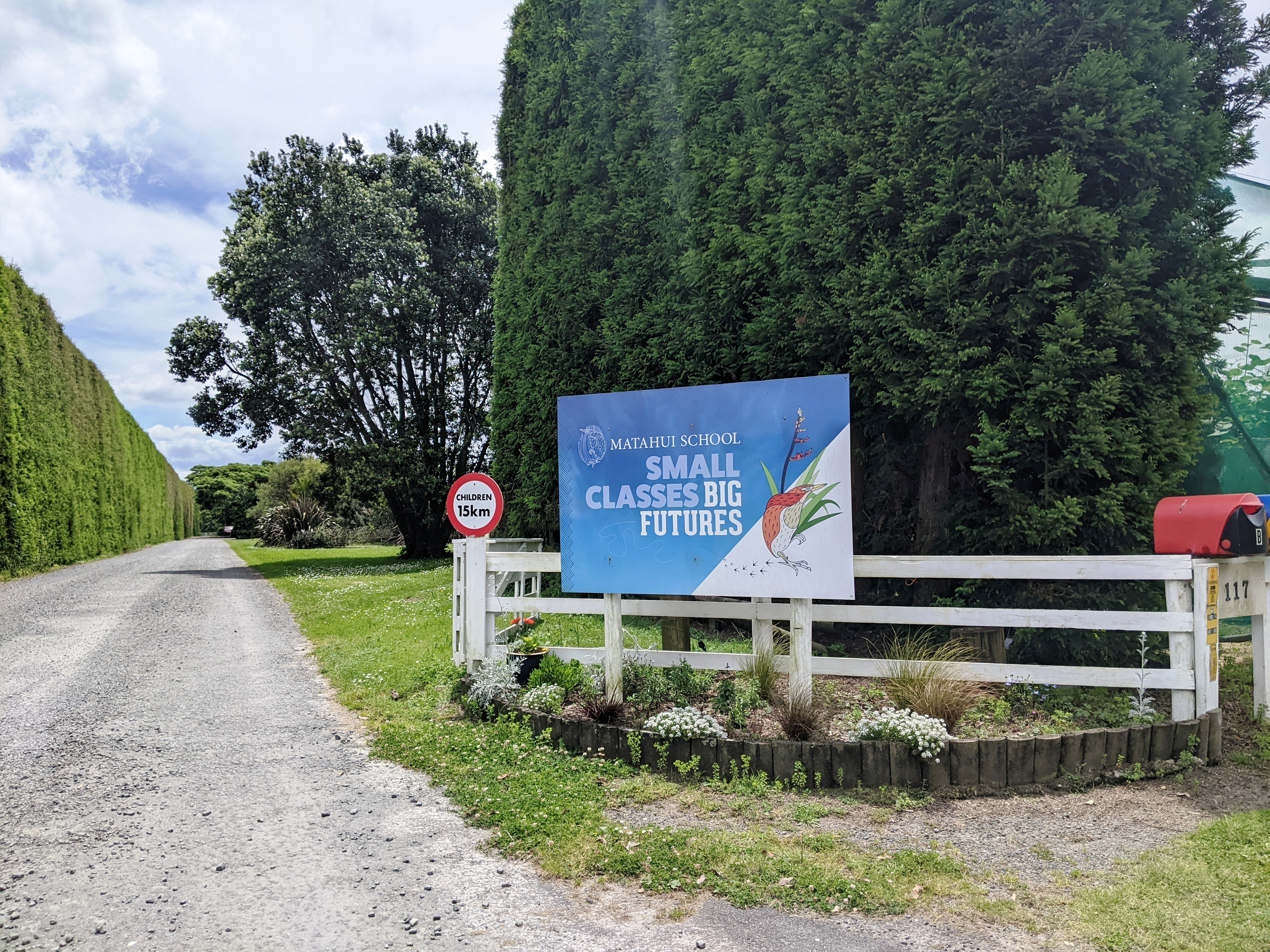
Matahui School

Aongatete had a population of 3,519 in the 2023 New Zealand census, an increase of 366 people (11.6%) since the 2018 census, and an increase of 795 people (29.2%) since the 2013 census. There were 1,809 males, 1,707 females, and 6 people of other genders in 1,356 dwellings. 1.9% of people identified as LGBTIQ+. The median age was 53.5 years (compared with 38.1 years nationally). There were 462 people (13.1%) aged under 15 years, 438 (12.4%) aged 15 to 29, 1,569 (44.6%) aged 30 to 64, and 1,044 (29.7%) aged 65 or older.

People could identify as more than one ethnicity. The results were 89.1% European (Pākehā); 10.8% Māori; 3.1% Pasifika; 4.3% Asian; 0.6% Middle Eastern, Latin American and African New Zealanders (MELAA); and 4.3% other, which includes people giving their ethnicity as "New Zealander". English was spoken by 97.4%, Māori by 1.7%, Samoan by 0.1%, and other languages by 9.5%. No language could be spoken by 1.4% (e.g. too young to talk). New Zealand Sign Language was known by 0.4%. The percentage of people born overseas was 22.2, compared with 28.8% nationally.

Religious affiliations were 28.7% Christian, 0.4% Hindu, 0.3% Islam, 0.3% Māori religious beliefs, 1.0% Buddhist, 0.5% New Age, and 2.1% other religions. People who answered that they had no religion were 58.9%, and 7.5% of people did not answer the census question.

Of those at least 15 years old, 621 (20.3%) people had a bachelor's or higher degree, 1,716 (56.1%) had a post-high school certificate or diploma, and 720 (23.6%) people exclusively held high school qualifications. The median income was $34,300, compared with $41,500 nationally. 306 people (10.0%) earned over $100,000 compared to 12.1% nationally. The employment status of those at least 15 was 1,356 (44.4%) full-time, 513 (16.8%) part-time, and 66 (2.2%) unemployed.

== Education ==
Matahui Road School is a co-educational private primary school, with a roll of 50 as of July 2026.

The school was established in 1988 and is governed by the Matahui Road School Charitable Trust.
