= Fairview Drive =

Fairview Drive may refer to:

- Fairview Drive, Fayetteville, Arkansas, the location of Hantz House
- Fairview Drive, McGehee, Arkansas, the location of Jay Lewis House
- Fairview Drive, a road in Hancock, West Virginia
- Fairview Drive in Nevada, a junction of Interstate 580

== See also ==
- Fairview (disambiguation)
- Fairview Road (disambiguation)
