= Chelsea (Delaware City, Delaware) =

Historic house in Delaware, United States

- U.S. National Register of Historic Places
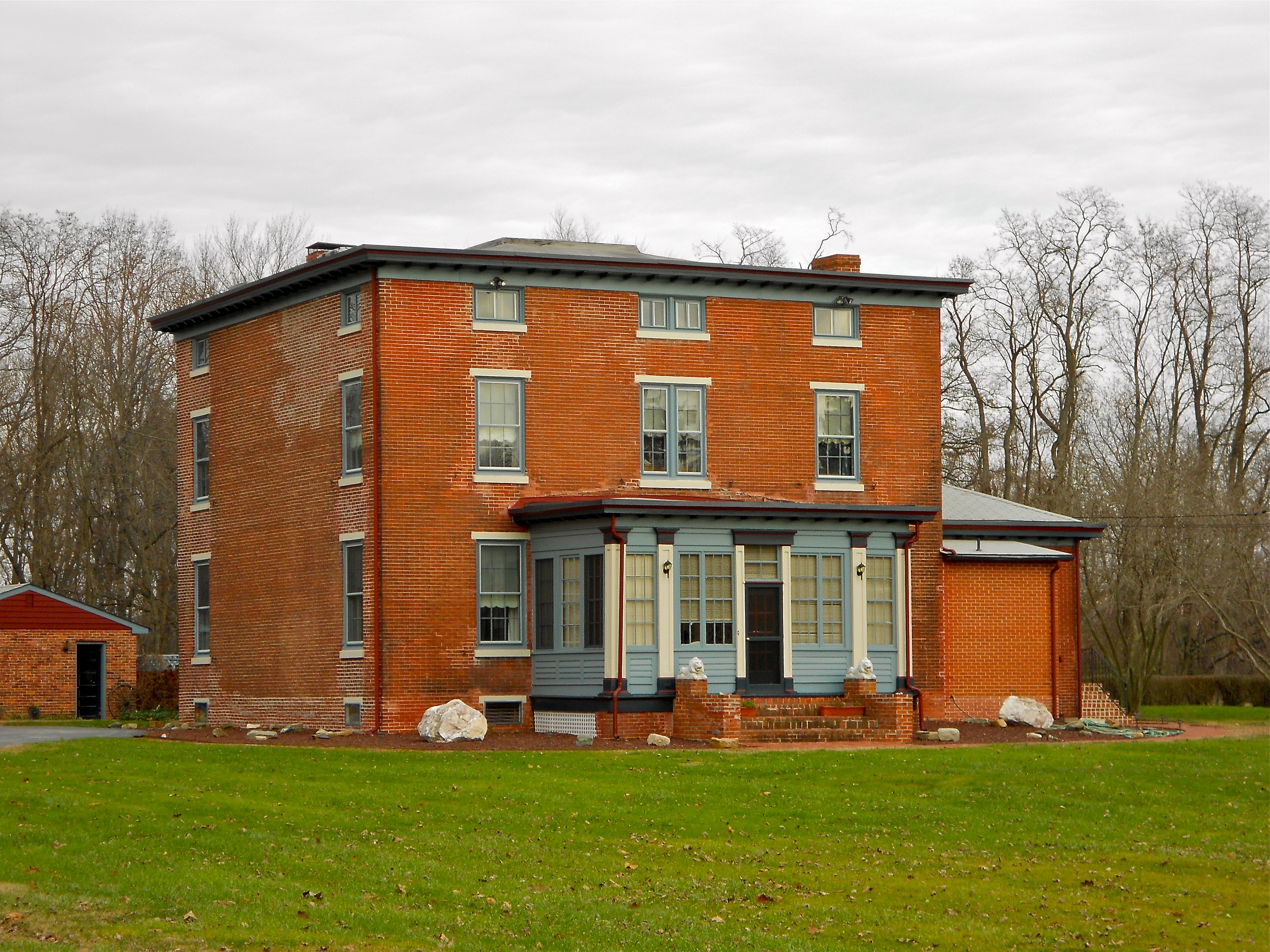
- Chelsea, December 2011

- Location within Delaware Location within the United States
- Location: 910 5th St., Delaware City, Delaware
- Coordinates: 39.576892°N 75.598971°W
- Area: 1.8 acres (0.73 ha)
- Built: 1848
- Architectural style: Greek Revival, Italianate, Peach Mansion
- MPS: Red Lion Hundred MRA
- NRHP reference No.: 82002325
- Added to NRHP: April 8, 1982

Chelsea is a historic home located in Delaware City, New Castle County, Delaware. It was built in 1848 by Thomas Clark, and is a three-story, three-bay-square brick block with a low, almost flat, hipped roof surmounted by a widow's walk. It is in a regional variation of the Italianate / Greek Revival style. It has a low, one-story wing at the east side, a wide, one-story glass-enclosed front porch and a large, two-story addition to the rear of the house.

It was listed on the National Register of Historic Places in 1982.
