= Fairview Presbyterian Church =

Fairview Presbyterian Church may refer to:

- Fairview Presbyterian Church (Lawrenceville, Georgia)
- Fairview Presbyterian Church (Fountain Inn, South Carolina), listed on the NRHP in South Carolina
