= Delaware City, Delaware =

City in Delaware, United States

- City
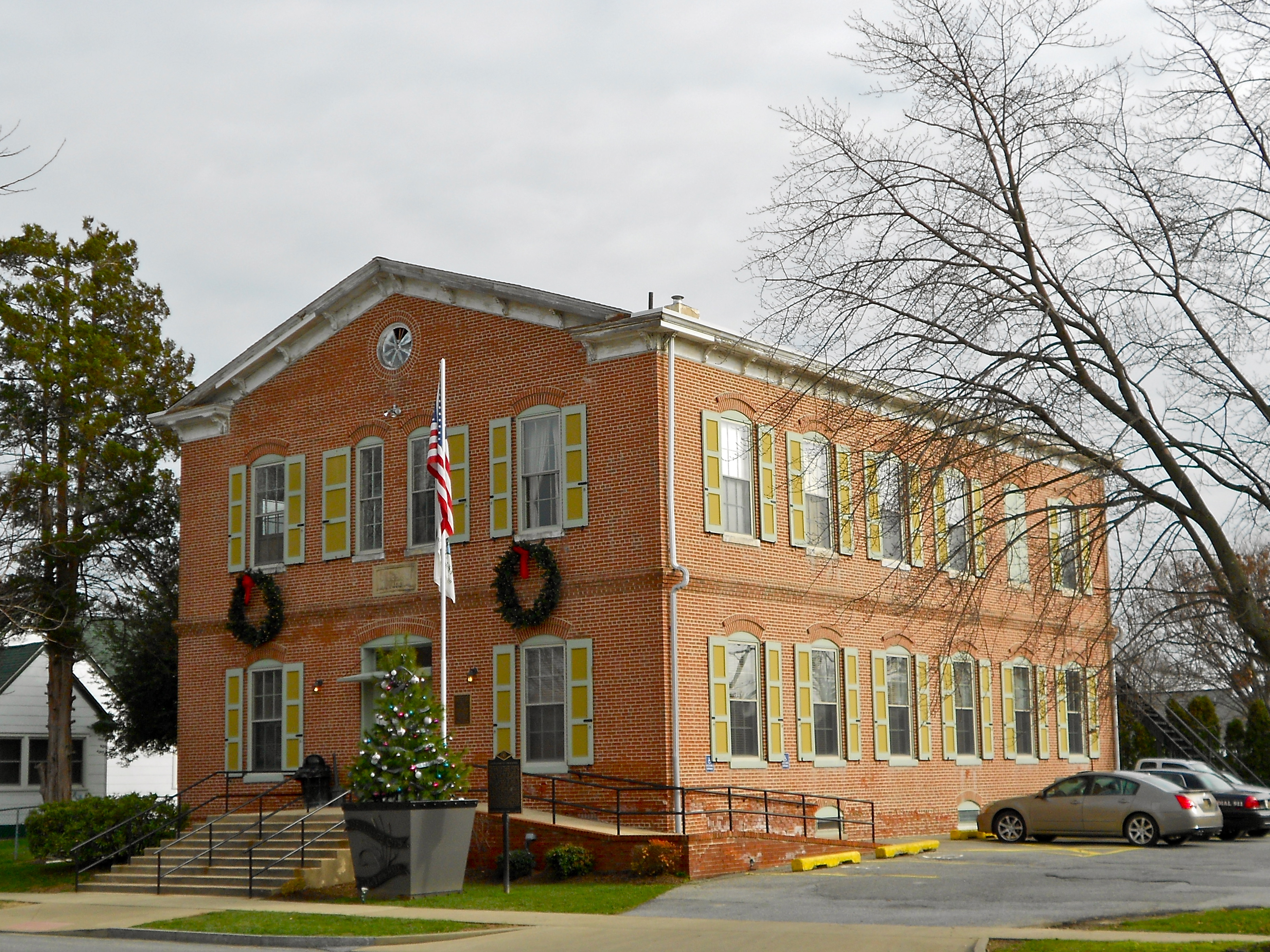
- Former school and Town Hall on Clinton Street

- Seal
- Motto: Port Of History
- Location of Delaware City in New Castle County, Delaware.

- Location within the state of Delaware Delaware City (the United States)
- Coordinates: 39°34′40″N 75°35′20″W
- Country: United States
- State: Delaware
- County: New Castle

Government
  - Mayor: Paul H. Johnson, Sr.

Area
  - Total: 1.95 sq mi (5.06 km^{2})
  - Land: 1.86 sq mi (4.82 km^{2})
  - Water: 0.093 sq mi (0.24 km^{2})
- Elevation: 7 ft (2.1 m)

Population (2020)
  - Total: 1,885
  - Density: 1,013.1/sq mi (391.16/km^{2})
- Time zone: UTC−5 (Eastern (EST))
  - Summer (DST): UTC−4 (EDT)
- ZIP code: 19706
- Area code: 302
- FIPS code: 10-19730
- GNIS feature ID: 213872
- Website: www.delawarecity.org

Delaware City is a city in New Castle County, Delaware, United States. The population was 1,885 as of 2020. It is a small port town on the eastern terminus of the Chesapeake and Delaware Canal and is the location of the Forts Ferry Crossing to Fort Delaware on Pea Patch Island.

== History ==
The Delaware City Historic District, Chelsea, Eastern Lock of the Chesapeake and Delaware Canal, Fairview, and Fort Delaware on Pea Patch Island are listed on the National Register of Historic Places.

== Geography ==
Delaware City is located at 39°34′40″N 75°35′20″W (39.5778901, –75.5888150).

According to the United States Census Bureau, the city has a total area of 1.3 square miles (3.4 km^{2}), of which 1.3 square miles (3.4 km^{2}) is land and 0.1 square miles (0.26 km^{2}) (6.01%) is water.

== Demographics ==
Historical population
Census	Pop.	Note	%±
1850	911		—
1860	1,355		48.7%
1870	1,059		−21.8%
1880	1,085		2.5%
1890	969		−10.7%
1900	1,132		16.8%
1910	1,132		0.0%
1920	1,064		−6.0%
1930	1,005		−5.5%
1940	1,163		15.7%
1950	1,363		17.2%
1960	1,658		21.6%
1970	2,024		22.1%
1980	1,858		−8.2%
1990	1,682		−9.5%
2000	1,453		−13.6%
2010	1,695		16.7%
2020	1,885		11.2%
U.S. Decennial Census

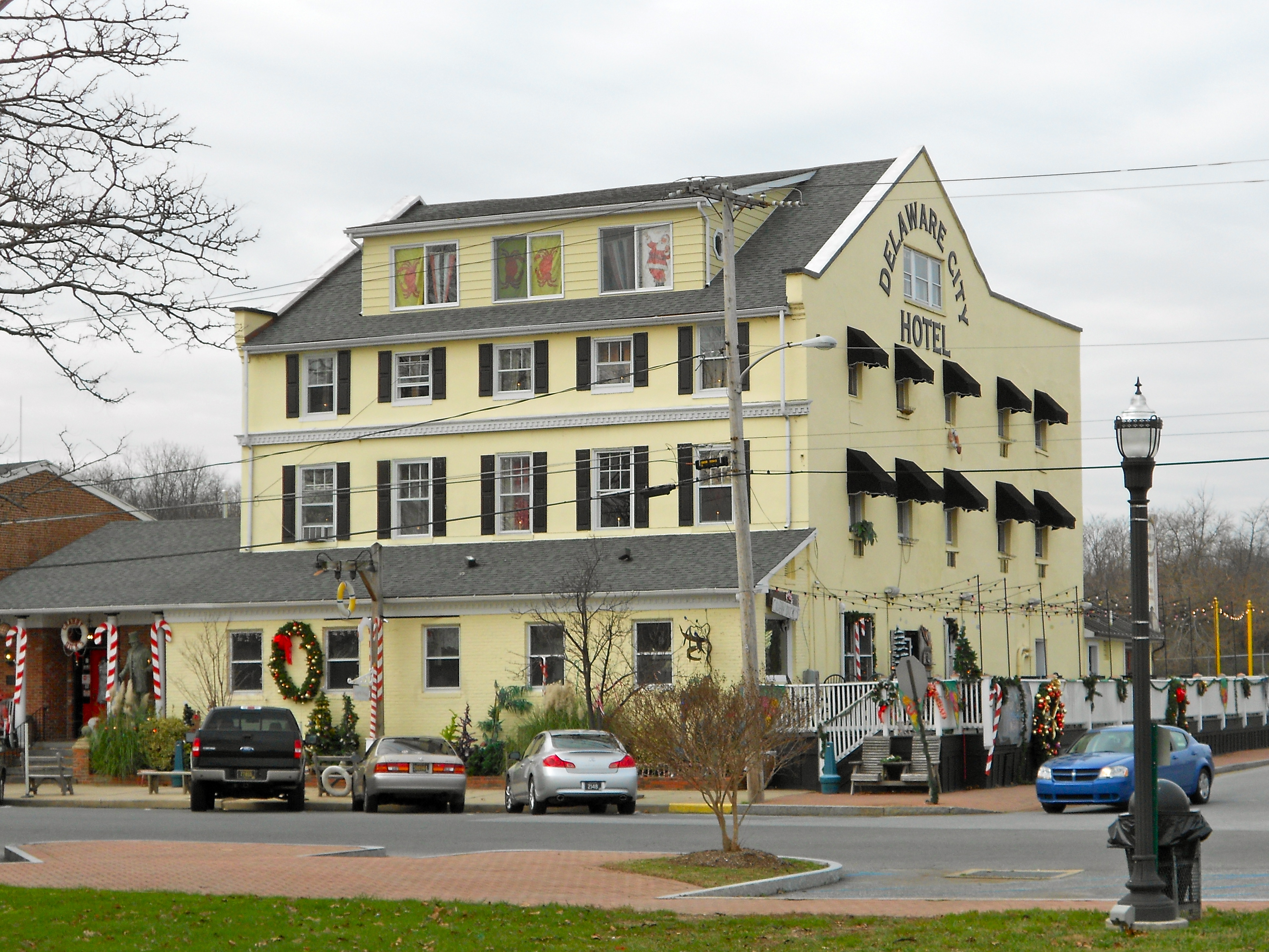
Delaware City Hotel

=== 2020 census ===
As of the 2020 census, Delaware City had a population of 1,885. The median age was 40.2 years. 21.6% of residents were under the age of 18 and 19.9% of residents were 65 years of age or older. For every 100 females there were 95.9 males, and for every 100 females age 18 and over there were 98.1 males age 18 and over.

0.0% of residents lived in urban areas, while 100.0% lived in rural areas.

There were 747 households in Delaware City, of which 34.1% had children under the age of 18 living in them. Of all households, 37.5% were married-couple households, 23.3% were households with a male householder and no spouse or partner present, and 29.7% were households with a female householder and no spouse or partner present. About 25.4% of all households were made up of individuals and 11.3% had someone living alone who was 65 years of age or older.

There were 797 housing units, of which 6.3% were vacant. The homeowner vacancy rate was 0.7% and the rental vacancy rate was 3.9%.

Racial composition as of the 2020 census
Race	Number	Percent
White	1,435	76.1%
Black or African American	210	11.1%
American Indian and Alaska Native	9	0.5%
Asian	8	0.4%
Native Hawaiian and Other Pacific Islander	0	0.0%
Some other race	37	2.0%
Two or more races	186	9.9%
Hispanic or Latino (of any race)	132	7.0%

=== 2000 census ===
As of the census of 2000, there were 1,453 people, 567 households, and 395 families residing in the city. The population density was 1,156.3 inhabitants per square mile (446.4/km^{2}). There were 616 housing units at an average density of 490.2 per square mile (189.3/km^{2}). The racial makeup of the city was 87.47% White, 10.32% African American, 0.41% Native American, 0.21% Asian, 0.69% from other races, and 0.89% from two or more races. Hispanic or Latino of any race were 1.24% of the population.

There were 567 households, out of which 31.6% had children under the age of 18 living with them, 46.0% were married couples living together, 16.0% had a female householder with no husband present, and 30.2% were non-families. 25.4% of all households were made up of individuals, and 8.8% had someone living alone who was 65 years of age or older. The average household size was 2.55 and the average family size was 3.03.

The age distribution of the population of the city in 2000 was 24.8% under the age of 18, 7.2% from 18 to 24, 28.7% from 25 to 44, 27.3% from 45 to 64, and 12.0% who were 65 years of age or older. The median age was 38 years. For every 100 females, there were 101.5 males. For every 100 females age 18 and over, there were 98.4 males.

The median income for a household in the city was $43,611, and the median income for a family was $50,294. Males had a median income of $40,192 versus $27,800 for females. The per capita income for the city was $21,992. About 5.9% of families and 8.5% of the population were below the poverty line, including 11.7% of those under age 18 and 11.2% of those age 65 or over.

== Economy ==
Delaware City is close to the Delaware City Oil Refinery belonging to PBF Energy.

== Entertainment and leisure ==
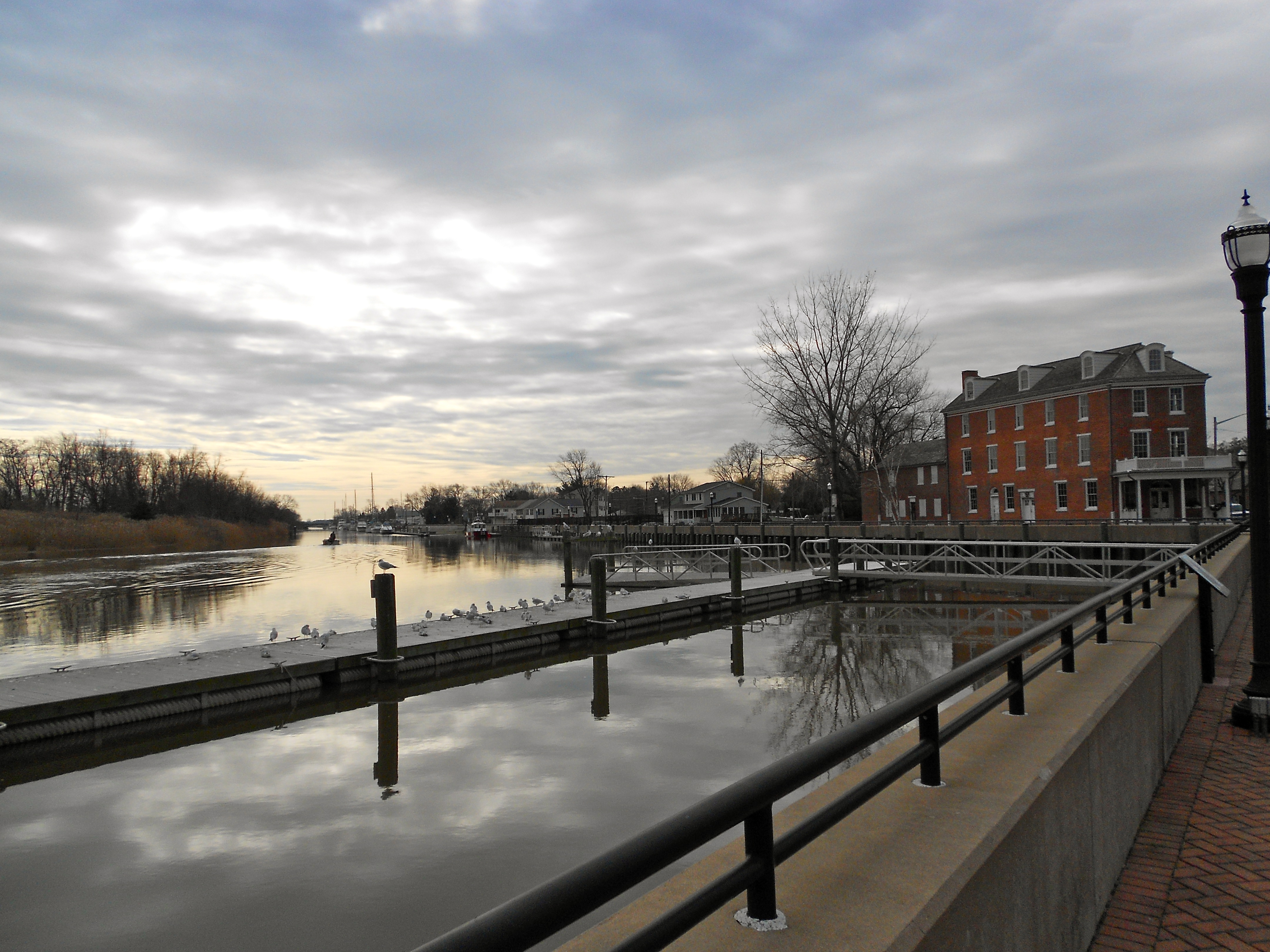
Entrance to Chesapeake and Delaware Canal

Delaware City's Fort DuPont State Park contains the home field of the Diamond State Base Ball Club, a vintage base ball team. The Diamond State Base Ball Club typically plays 4-6 games there per year. The Diamond State Base Ball Club also plays at least once per year at Fort Delaware on Pea Patch Island and also at nearby Port Penn, Delaware. The Diamond State Base Ball Club is a non-profit amateur organization created for the purposes of providing physical fitness to its members, educating the public on the history of baseball and local history, and serving as a point of public pride.

== Education ==
Delaware City is in the Colonial School District. It operates William Penn High School.

Previously Delaware City was in the New Castle-Gunning Bedford School District. That district merged into the New Castle County School District in 1978. That district was divided into four districts, among them the Colonial district, in 1981.

Delaware City Public Library is the public library of the municipality.

== Infrastructure ==
=== Transportation ===
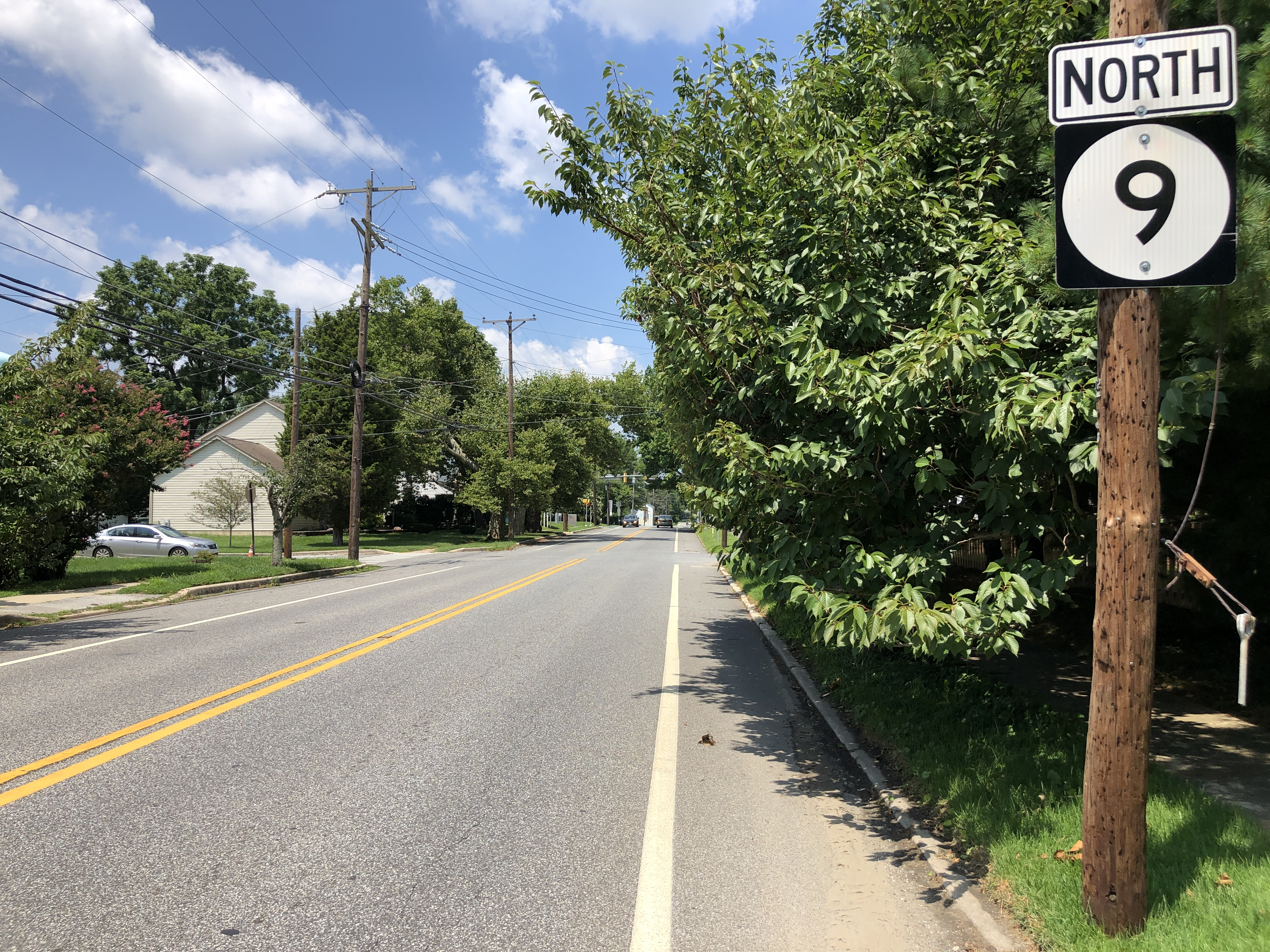
DE 9 northbound in Delaware City

Delaware Route 9 serves as the main road through Delaware City, passing southeast–northwest through the city on 5th Street. South of Delaware City, DE 9 passes over the Chesapeake and Delaware Canal on the Reedy Point Bridge. North of Delaware City, DE 9 has an intersection with Delaware Route 72, which provides access to U.S. Route 13 and Delaware Route 1. DART First State provides bus service to Delaware City along Route 44, which heads north to Christiana Mall. Delaware City is at the east end of the Chesapeake and Delaware Canal, which provides boaters with access to the Delaware River to the east and the Chesapeake Bay to the west. The Forts Ferry Crossing is a passenger ferry that provides access from Delaware City to Fort Delaware on Pea Patch Island in the Delaware River and to Fort Mott in New Jersey.

=== Utilities ===
Delmarva Power, a subsidiary of Exelon, provides electricity and natural gas to Delaware City. The water system in Delaware City is owned by the city and operated under contract by Artesian Water Company, a subsidiary of Artesian Resources. Sewer service in Delaware City is provided by New Castle County. Trash collection is provided under contract by Waste Industries while recycling collection is provided by the city. Cable and internet in Delaware City is provided by Atlantic Broadband and Verizon. Telephone service is provided mostly by Verizon, with Cavalier Telephone also serving the city.

== Notable people ==
- Nana Akosah-Bempah, soccer player
- Lt. Gen. Eugene Reybold, U.S. Army Corps of Engineers, chief of engineers, during World War II
- John E. Rickards, first Lieutenant Governor of Montana and the second Governor of Montana
- Bill Press, liberal political commentator and former candidate for Senator of California.
