= Olivia Nuzzi =

American political reporter (born 1993)

- Born: January 6, 1993 (age 33); New York City
- Education: Fordham University
- Occupation: Journalist
- Years active: 2011–present
- Notable credits: Vanity Fair (2025); New York (2017–2024); American Canto (2025)
- Partner: Ryan Lizza (engaged 2022–2024)

Olivia Nuzzi (born January 6, 1993) is an American writer and editor who briefly was the West Coast Editor of Vanity Fair. She was the Washington, D.C. correspondent for New York magazine from 2017 to 2024 and a writer for The Daily Beast covering the Donald Trump 2016 presidential campaign. In September 2024, New York placed her on leave after she disclosed having an affair with Robert F. Kennedy Jr. while reporting on his 2024 campaign. The following month, Nuzzi and New York "parted ways." She published a memoir entitled American Canto in 2025.

== Early life and education ==
Nuzzi was born in New York City, the daughter of Kelly and John Nuzzi. She has a brother, Jonathan. John Nuzzi was born in Brooklyn, New York. He worked for the New York City Department of Sanitation for 20 years, including at the site of 9/11, and died in December 2015. Nuzzi wrote about her father after his death for The Daily Beast. Her mother, Kelly Nuzzi, a former catalog model, who had Olivia when she was 30, died in February 2021. After her death, Nuzzi wrote about her for New York in a piece about Jill Biden and grief.

Nuzzi grew up in the River Plaza neighborhood of Middletown Township, New Jersey. She attended and graduated from Middletown High School South and attended Fordham University.

In 2010, Nuzzi, as "Livvy" (also reportedly Kennedy's later nickname for her), released a song titled "Jailbait", as part of an attempt to launch a music career.

== Career ==
Nuzzi began her writing career as a teenager in 2011, as a monthly political columnist for the triCityNews, an alt weekly based in Asbury Park, New Jersey. She also wrote for More Monmouth Musings, a politically conservative blog and news website.

=== Weiner mayoral campaign ===
While a 20-year-old junior at Fordham University in 2013, Nuzzi volunteered as an intern for Anthony Weiner's New York City mayoral campaign. During her brief stint, she was hired as a staff writer by NSFWcorp and described her experiences as an intern on the Weiner campaign in a blog post on July 28, 2013. In it, she asserted that Weiner referred to her and another female intern as "Monica," that an unnamed source told her that Weiner had lied to his campaign manager, who had quit as a result, and that the manager was one of a "series of staffers who have fled the campaign."

The New York Daily News commissioned Nuzzi to write a follow-up article about the campaign that became a July 30, 2013, front-page story. According to Nuzzi, some of her fellow interns were working in the campaign hoping to meet Weiner's then-wife, Huma Abedin, and, through Abedin, her boss Hillary Clinton, to be involved in Clinton's anticipated run for the presidency.

In an interview with Talking Points Memo that was published that day, Weiner's communications director Barbara Morgan, who later said she thought her interview was off the record, used several profane and vulgar slurs to describe Nuzzi and said Nuzzi "was clearly there because she wanted to be seen.... she would just not show up for work," that Nuzzi had signed and violated a non-disclosure agreement, and that Morgan had earlier "tried to fire her, but she begged to come back and I gave her a second chance." Morgan later apologized to Nuzzi, and Nuzzi accepted the apology.

=== Presidential campaigns and national correspondent ===
Nuzzi was hired by The Daily Beast in May 2014 while still attending Fordham. Nuzzi left school before graduating to take the job. At The Daily Beast, Nuzzi covered the presidential campaigns of Rand Paul and Chris Christie, as well as Donald Trump's political rise.

In February 2017, Nuzzi was hired by New York magazine to be its Washington correspondent. She has also written for Politico, GQ, Esquire, and The Washington Post.

In early 2018, Nuzzi admitted to entering the home office of Corey Lewandowski, Trump's former campaign manager, without permission, and taking a photo, while Lewandowski accused her of also taking a photo album of his. Nuzzi said, "You know, I just walked into the house, because nobody was answering at the door." She left the home after texting her boyfriend. Nuzzi said he advised her that "it probably wasn't legal and that I should leave. I was like, 'Fuck.'"

In October 2018, Trump invited Nuzzi into the Oval Office for an exclusive interview.

=== Television ===
In 2022, AMC announced that Nuzzi would write and executive produce A Message from the State, a black comedy, with Gina Mingacci, the executive producer of Killing Eve. Nuzzi also made an appearance playing herself in the Showtime series Billions. Nuzzi produced a documentary for MSNBC, Four Seasons Total Documentary, about Rudy Giuliani's botched attempt to contest the 2020 election results. In April 2023, Nuzzi began hosting the companion podcast for HBO's White House Plumbers miniseries. In 2024, Nuzzi hosted Working Capital, a six-episode interview series on Bloomberg Television, featuring conversations with politicians and businessmen.

=== Robert F. Kennedy Jr. scandal ===
In September 2024, former CNN media reporter Oliver Darcy reported in his newsletter Status that Nuzzi "engaged in an inappropriate relationship" with presidential candidate Robert F. Kennedy Jr., whom she had covered in a profile story in November 2023. (Note: The profile story was: Nuzzi, Olivia (November 22, 2023). "The Mind-Bending Politics of RFK Jr.'s Spoiler Campaign". New York. Intelligencer.) Nuzzi was put on leave from New York after acknowledging being in a non-physical "personal relationship" with Kennedy. The relationship was described by a third party as "emotional and digital in nature." Darcy said that Nuzzi's actions constituted a "conflict of interest," saying Nuzzi was "one of the most high-profile journalists in America, and she arguably wrote one of the most consequential pieces of the 2024 campaign, which was about what she called the conspiracy of silence to protect Joe Biden. And given that readers did not know that this relationship was ongoing with RFK, it raises questions about conflict of interest, because RFK has been an active participant in the 2024 campaign." A spokesperson for Kennedy said he "only met Olivia Nuzzi once in his life for an interview she requested, which yielded a hit piece."

New York said Nuzzi's actions were "a violation of the magazine's standards around conflicts of interest and disclosures," adding that "had the magazine been aware of this relationship, she would not have continued to cover the presidential campaign." While "an internal review of her published work has found no inaccuracies nor evidence of bias," the magazine apologized for "violating our readers' trust." On October 21, New York published a statement that the publication and Nuzzi had "parted ways."

=== Vanity Fair and American Canto ===
In September 2025, Nuzzi was announced as the new West Coast Editor for Vanity Fair. Two months later, publisher Simon & Schuster announced the upcoming publication of Nuzzi's memoir, American Canto, described as "a mesmerizing firsthand account of the warping of American reality over the past decade as Donald Trump has risen to dominance—from a participatory witness who got so far inside the distortion field that it swallowed her whole." While not mentioned by name, Kennedy was understood to be a subject of the memoir when it released in December. It was excerpted in Vanity Fair.

Later in 2025, Nuzzi's ex-fiancé Ryan Lizza then claimed that in 2020, she had an affair with presidential candidate Mark Sanford while covering his campaign. Nuzzi's lawyer issued a statement: "In American Canto, Ms. Nuzzi discusses the only instance in her long career as a journalist in which she had an improper relationship with someone she was covering." (Lizza wrote that Nuzzi said the affair took place after she published her profile of Sanford.) After Lizza's post, Vanity Fair announced that it was reviewing its relationship with Nuzzi. In a second post, Lizza also claimed that Nuzzi had de facto acted as a political operative for Kennedy by running catch and kill operations on his behalf that shared opposition research and information from confidential sources with his campaign. Nuzzi described Lizza's claim as harassment and an attempt to damage her reputation.

Sales of American Canto were lower than expected, with CNN reporting it hit number 6,709 on Amazon's bestseller list.

In December 2025, Vanity Fair publisher Condé Nast announced that Nuzzi's contract would expire at the end of the year.

== Recognition ==
In 2017, Nuzzi was named to Forbes's 2018 30 Under 30 list. In 2019, Nuzzi was awarded a "NEXT" award by the American Society of Magazine Editors. She was also a finalist for the 2023 National Magazine Award for feature writing.

== Personal life ==
Nuzzi dated Keith Olbermann around 2011 when she was 18 and he was 52. In September 2022, she became engaged to Politico's chief Washington correspondent Ryan Lizza. In September 2024, following the public revelation that Nuzzi had an affair with Kennedy, Lizza announced he had ended his relationship with Nuzzi.

In October 2024, Nuzzi filed a protection order against Lizza saying he "explicitly threatened to make public personal information about me to destroy my life, career, and reputation—a threat he has since carried out." Nuzzi alleged Lizza hacked her devices "for the purposes of stalking and surveilling me and to collect materials to deploy as blackmail to intimidate me back into a relationship and to inflict public ridicule and humiliation as well as professional damage as punishment when I would not return to the relationship." She asked a court to drop the protection order against Lizza in November 2024.

In November 2025, Lizza claimed that while she was seeing him, Nuzzi had an affair with former South Carolina Governor Mark Sanford, who was considering challenging then-president Donald Trump for the Republican nomination for president in 2020. Nuzzi had profiled Sanford for New York magazine.

Nuzzi suffers from insomnia. As of November 2025, she resides in Malibu, California.
