= Fairview Township, Minnesota =

Fairview Township is the name of some places in the U.S. state of Minnesota:

- Fairview Township, Cass County, Minnesota
- Fairview Township, Lyon County, Minnesota

== See also ==
- Fairview Township (disambiguation)
