= Fairview Township, Caldwell County, Missouri =

Township in the US state of Missouri

Fairview Township
- Township
- Coordinates: 39°39′45″N 093°48′13″W
- Country: United States
- State: Missouri
- County: Caldwell

Area
  - Total: 35.88 sq mi (92.93 km^{2})
  - Land: 35.86 sq mi (92.88 km^{2})
  - Water: 0.019 sq mi (0.05 km^{2}) 0.05%
- Elevation: 876 ft (267 m)

Population (2000)
  - Total: 161
  - Density: 4.4/sq mi (1.7/km^{2})
- FIPS code: 29-23464
- GNIS feature ID: 0766360

Fairview Township is one of twelve townships in Caldwell County, Missouri, and is part of the Kansas City metropolitan area with the USA. As of the 2000 census, its population was 161.

== History ==
Fairview Township was established on November 4th, 1869, and named after a school of the same name within its borders.

== Geography ==
Fairview Township covers an area of 35.88 square miles (92.9 km^{2}) and contains no incorporated settlements.

The streams of Dead Oak Branch, Flat Creek, Panther Creek and Turkey Creek run through this township.
