= American Canto =

2025 book

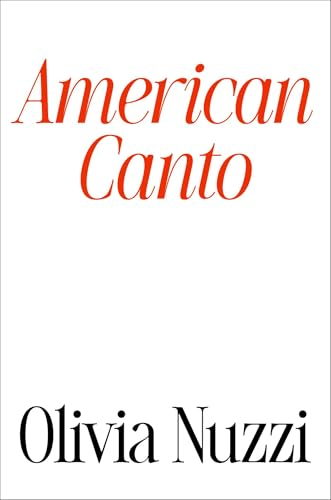
- Author: Olivia Nuzzi
- Language: English
- Genre: Memoir
- Publisher: Simon & Schuster
- Publication date: December 2, 2025
- Publication place: United States
- Pages: 320 (first edition)
- ISBN: 9781668209851

American Canto is a memoir by American journalist Olivia Nuzzi, released on December 2, 2025. The book details her relationship with Robert F. Kennedy Jr., who is referred to as "The Politician" throughout the book.

== Reception ==
Helen Lewis's review in The Atlantic described the book as a "tell-nothing memoir", criticizing it as being written in haste and for displaying a fundamental lack of honesty; Lewis contends that Nuzzi avoids directly confronting the "sheer desperation of her love for Kennedy" and instead attempts to elevate the scandal into mythic or literary significance: "The language seems tortured by Nuzzi's efforts to rewrite her life-upending crush into a mutual whirlwind of passion, to turn herself from Ophelia into Juliet." Lewis also criticizes Nuzzi as having "no real, believable regret" and dubbed American Canto a "portrait of losing your soul," and a bid to gain favorable media coverage and revive her career.

The New York Times's Alexandra Jacobs similarly critiques the book as "not a tell-all, not yet a memoir." Jacobs had followed Nuzzi's work prior writing that "the prose ... conveying access to some of most powerful people in the world — including President Trump — with uncommon verve and detachment. Though Nuzzi is only 32, she has for years reminded me of old-fashioned New Journalists like Tom Wolfe and Gay Talese." However, American Canto proceeds without chapters and is "scattershot.... "[w]afting and unfocused in a manner that makes you long for the sweet relief of a detailed policy paper."

Sales of American Canto were lower than expected. CNN reported it hit number 6,709 on Amazon's bestseller list, selling only 1,165 copies in hardcover its first week.
