= Fairview School =

Fairview School may refer to:

- Fairview School Building (Fairview, Arkansas), listed on the NRHP in Arkansas
- Fairview School (Canton, Mississippi), listed on the NRHP in Mississippi
- Fairview School (Meeker, Oklahoma), listed on the NRHP in Oklahoma
- Fairview School (Centerville, Tennessee), formerly listed on the NRHP in Tennessee
- Fairview International School, in Kuala Lumpur, Malaysia
