= Fairview, Barkly East =

Fairview
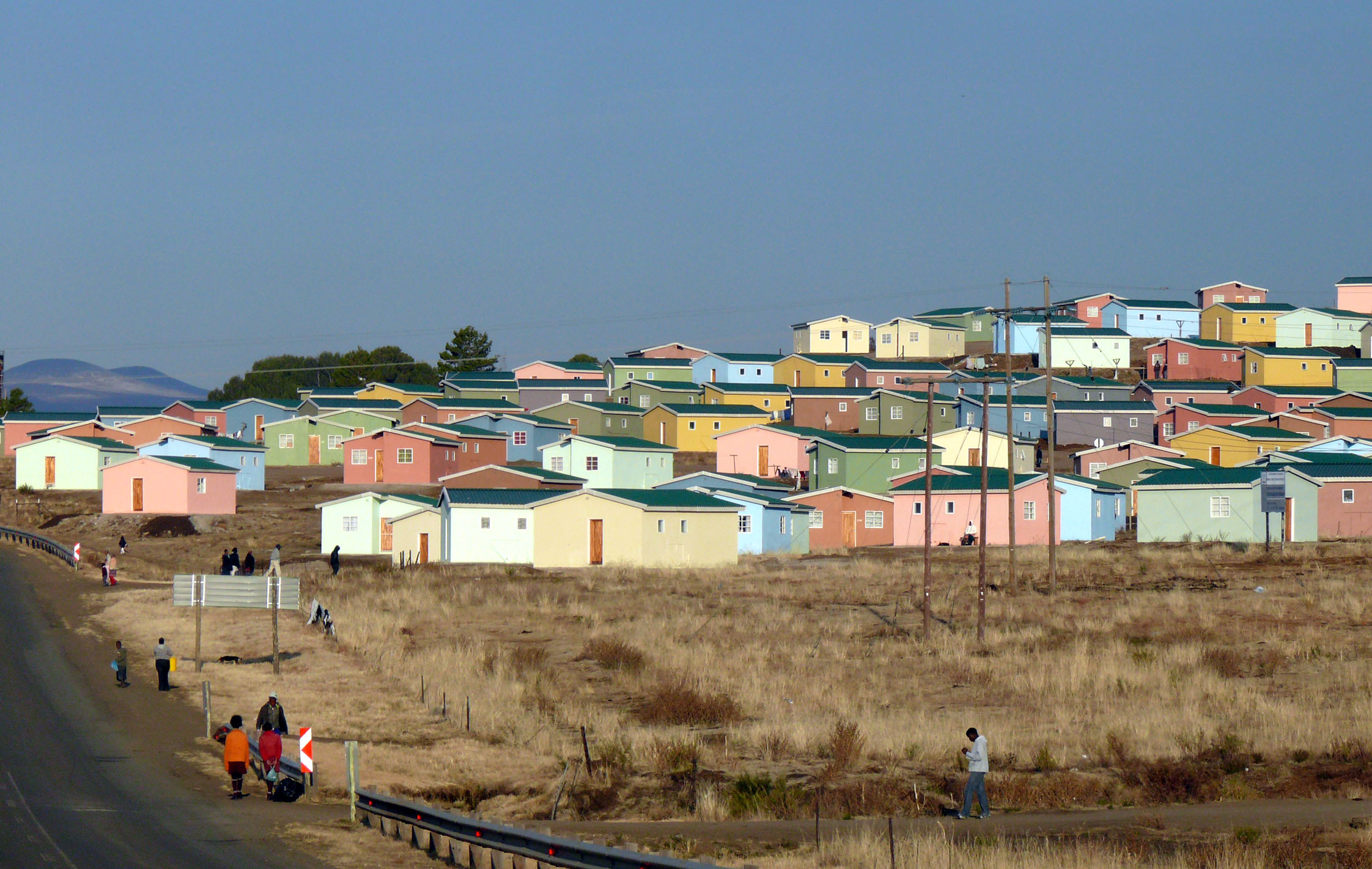
- Low-cost housing across Fairview

- Location within Eastern Cape Location within South Africa
- Coordinates: 30°57′54″S 27°35′8.5″E
- Country: South Africa
- Province: Eastern Cape
- District: Joe Gqabi
- Municipality: Senqu

Area
  - Total: 0.81 km^{2} (0.31 sq mi)
- Elevation: 1,790 m (5,870 ft)

Population (2011)
  - Total: 3,137
  - Density: 3,900/km^{2} (10,000/sq mi)

Racial makeup (2011)
  - Black African: 82.2%
  - Coloured: 17.6%
  - White: 0.2%

First languages (2011)
  - Xhosa: 70.0%
  - Afrikaans: 18.7%
  - Sotho: 6.7%
  - Sign Language: 2.0%
  - Other: 2.6%
- Time zone: UTC+2 (SAST)
- Postal code (street): 9786
- PO box: n/a
- Area code: 045-971-

Fairview is a township in Barkly East, a rural town in Eastern Cape Province, South Africa.
