= Twin Lakes Brewing Company =

American brewing company

- Industry: Alcoholic beverage
- Founded: 2006
- Headquarters: Newport, Delaware, USA
- Products: Beer
- Website: http://twinlakesbrewingcompany.com/index.htm

Twin Lakes Brewing Company is an American brewing company. Since August 2017, its brewery and taproom have been located in the Newport Industrial Park, in Newport, Delaware.

== History ==
The Twin Lakes Brewing Company was founded in Greenville, Delaware, in April, 2006. It moved to Newport, Delaware, in 2015. The tasting room closed in the spring of 2020 due to the pandemic. By February 2021, the brewery was on 'life support' according to a co-owner.

== Products ==
The Twin Lakes Brewing Company produces approximately 10,000 barrels of beer per year. Beers produced by Twin Lakes include Route 52 Pilsner, Greenville Pale Ale, Tweeds Tavern Stout, Winterthur spring Wheat Ale, Jubilicous Holiday Ale, and Caesar Rodney Golden Ale. The names of these beers come from the rich history of the brewery and its surrounding area. The newest addition to the Twin Lakes family of beers is the Oktoberfest, which is being brewed in a very limited supply through the month of September. Twin Lakes beer is available throughout Delaware and, starting on May 16, 2009, Pennsylvania.

== Green energy ==
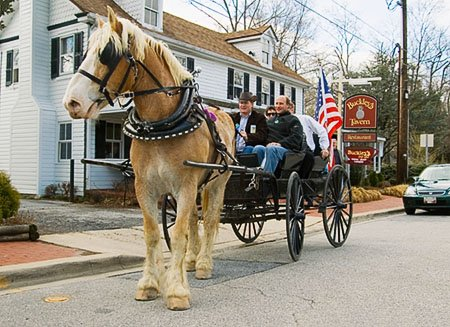
Delicious, the Twin Lakes Brewery's own horse

In its former location, Twin Lakes installed 2-kilowatt solar energy panels.
