= Fairview School (Canton, Mississippi) =

- U.S. National Register of Historic Places
- Location within Mississippi Location within the United States
- Location: 1278 N. Old Canton Rd., Canton, Mississippi
- NRHP reference No.: 08000199
- Added to NRHP: February 11, 2009

Fairview School in Canton, Mississippi was listed on the U.S. National Register of Historic Places in 2009.

It is a two-room building which had served about 40 students per year from the local area from 1920s into the 1960s.

In 2016, it is also known as Fairview Museum School. It originally was established in 1890 and operated until 1960, and it educated black students of Madison County, Mississippi.
