= Fairview, Bay of Plenty =

Rural settlement in the Bay of Plenty, New Zealand

Fairview
- Rural settlement
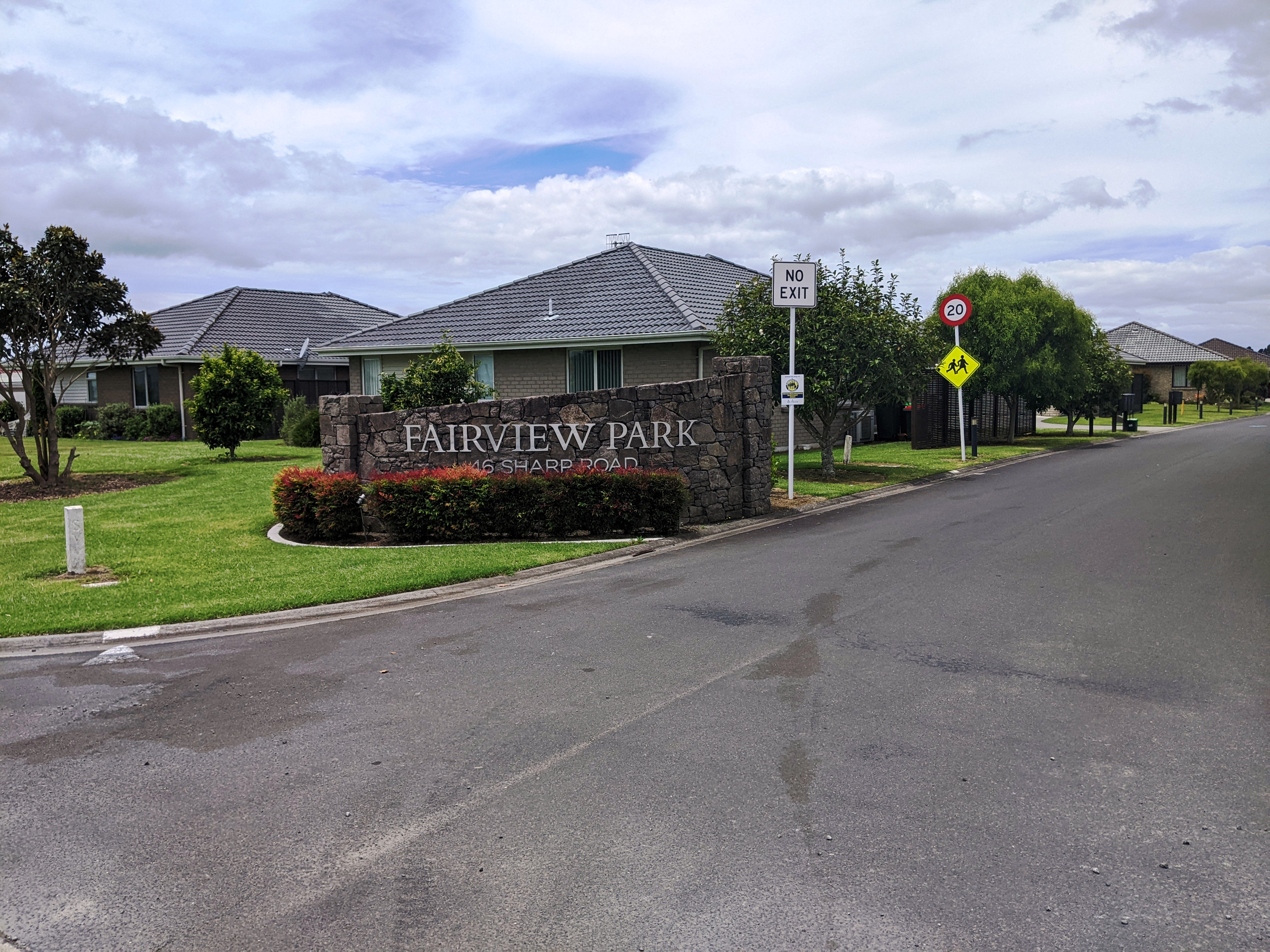
- Fairview Park
- Interactive map of Fairview
- Coordinates: 37.590°S 175.920°E
- Country: New Zealand
- Region: Bay of Plenty
- Territorial authority: Western Bay of Plenty District
- Ward: Katikati-Waihi Beach Ward
- Community: Katikati Community
- Electorates: Coromandel; Waiariki (Māori)

Government
  - Territorial Authority: Western Bay of Plenty District Council
  - Regional council: Bay of Plenty Regional Council
  - Mayor of Western Bay of Plenty: James Denyer
  - Coromandel MP: Scott Simpson
  - Waiariki MP: Rawiri Waititi

Area
  - Total: 0.82 km^{2} (0.32 sq mi)

Population (June 2025)
  - Total: 410
  - Density: 500/km^{2} (1,300/sq mi)
- Postcode(s): 3178

Fairview or Fairview Estate is a rural settlement in the Western Bay of Plenty District and Bay of Plenty Region of New Zealand's North Island. It is about 5.5 km south of Katikati, and is marketed as a lifestyle subdivision.

== Demographics ==
Fairview is defined by Statistics New Zealand as a rural settlement which covers 0.82 km^{2} (0.32 sq mi). It had an estimated population of 410 as of June 2025, with a population density of 500 people per km^{2}. It is part of the larger Aongatete statistical area.

Historical population
Year	Pop.	±% p.a.
2006	36	—
2013	51	+5.10%
2018	297	+42.25%
2023	399	+6.08%

Fairview had a population of 399 in the 2023 New Zealand census, an increase of 102 people (34.3%) since the 2018 census, and an increase of 348 people (682.4%) since the 2013 census. There were 186 males, 210 females, and 3 people of other genders in 204 dwellings. 0.8% of people identified as LGBTIQ+. The median age was 72.4 years (compared with 38.1 years nationally). There were 15 people (3.8%) aged under 15 years, 3 (0.8%) aged 15 to 29, 72 (18.0%) aged 30 to 64, and 303 (75.9%) aged 65 or older.

People could identify as more than one ethnicity. The results were 95.5% European (Pākehā), 7.5% Māori, 1.5% Pasifika, 1.5% Asian, and 1.5% other, which includes people giving their ethnicity as "New Zealander". English was spoken by 99.2%, Māori by 0.8%, and other languages by 6.8%. The percentage of people born overseas was 27.8, compared with 28.8% nationally.

Religious affiliations were 53.4% Christian, and 0.8% other religions. People who answered that they had no religion were 39.8%, and 5.3% of people did not answer the census question.

Of those at least 15 years old, 63 (16.4%) people had a bachelor's or higher degree, 192 (50.0%) had a post-high school certificate or diploma, and 126 (32.8%) people exclusively held high school qualifications. The median income was $24,500, compared with $41,500 nationally. 21 people (5.5%) earned over $100,000 compared to 12.1% nationally. The employment status of those at least 15 was 54 (14.1%) full-time, 36 (9.4%) part-time, and 3 (0.8%) unemployed.

== Notable people ==
- Glyn Tucker, musician.
