= Fairview Presbyterian Church (Lawrenceville, Georgia) =

- Fairview Presbyterian Church
- 33°58′5″N 84°1′13″W
- Location: 857 Duluth Highway Lawrenceville, Georgia
- Country: United States of America
- Denomination: Presbyterian
- Website: www.fairviewpres.org

History
- Founded: August 10, 1823; 203 years ago
- Founder: Rev. Remembrance Chamberlain

Architecture
- Style: American colonial

Clergy
- Pastor: Rev. Stephanie Bishop

Fairview Presbyterian Church in Lawrenceville, Georgia, USA, is the state's oldest still-running Presbyterian church, first opening on Sunday, August 10, 1823.

The church consists of four distinct areas: a sanctuary, a fellowship hall, a graveyard, and an Sunday school worship building. Despite its age, it is well cared for, receiving updates and repairs whenever and wherever they are needed, including but not limited to, pews, security cameras, extra rooms, and a speaker system. The only thing that hasn't changed is the overall look from the exterior; the siding is still the same style, and the stained-glass windows are the originals.
