= Fairview, Mossel Bay =

Fairview
- Location within Western Cape Location within South Africa
- Coordinates: 34°11′00″S 22°08′00″E
- Country: South Africa
- Province: Western Cape
- District: Eden
- Municipality: Mossel Bay

Area
  - Total: 0.89 km^{2} (0.34 sq mi)

Population (2011)
  - Total: 3,624
  - Density: 4,100/km^{2} (11,000/sq mi)

Racial makeup (2011)
  - Black African: 44.5%
  - Coloured: 49.0%
  - Indian/Asian: 0.7%
  - White: 4.4%
  - Other: 1.4%

First languages (2011)
  - Afrikaans: 52.6%
  - Xhosa: 38.4%
  - English: 5.4%
  - Other: 3.6%
- Time zone: UTC+2 (SAST)
- Postal code (street): 6506
- PO box: n/a
- Area code: 044

Fairview is a suburb of Mossel Bay, a large town on the south coast of the Western Cape province in South Africa
