= Fairview Park =

Fairview Park may refer to:

== Australia ==
- Fairview Park, South Australia

== Canada ==
- CF Fairview Park (a.k.a. Fairview Park Mall), a shopping centre in Kitchener, Ontario

== Hong Kong ==
- Fairview Park (Hong Kong), a private residential estate in the New Territories, Hong Kong
- Fairview Park (constituency)

== Ireland ==
- Fairview Park, Dublin, a city park in Dublin

== United States ==
- Fairview Park, Indiana
- Fairview Park, Ohio
- Fairview Park (Westmoreland County, Pennsylvania), a historic African American retreat center and recreation destination
- Fairview Park (Seattle), a city park in Seattle
- Fairview Park (dog racing track), former name of Multnomah Greyhound Park, in Oregon
