= Fairfield Township, Pennsylvania =

Fairfield Township is the name of some places in the U.S. state of Pennsylvania:

- Fairfield Township, Crawford County, Pennsylvania
- Fairfield Township, Lycoming County, Pennsylvania
- Fairfield Township, Westmoreland County, Pennsylvania

== See also ==
- East Fairfield Township, Crawford County, Pennsylvania
- Upper Fairfield Township, Pennsylvania
- Fairfield Township (disambiguation)
