= Fairview, Indiana =

Fairview, Indiana may refer to:

- Fairview, Randolph County, Indiana, an unincorporated community in Green Township
- Fairview, Rush County, Indiana, an unincorporated community in Rush and Fayette counties
- Fairview, Switzerland County, Indiana, an unincorporated community in Cotton Township
