= Fairview, Monmouth County, New Jersey =

Populated place in Monmouth County, New Jersey, US

Fairview, New Jersey
- Census-designated place
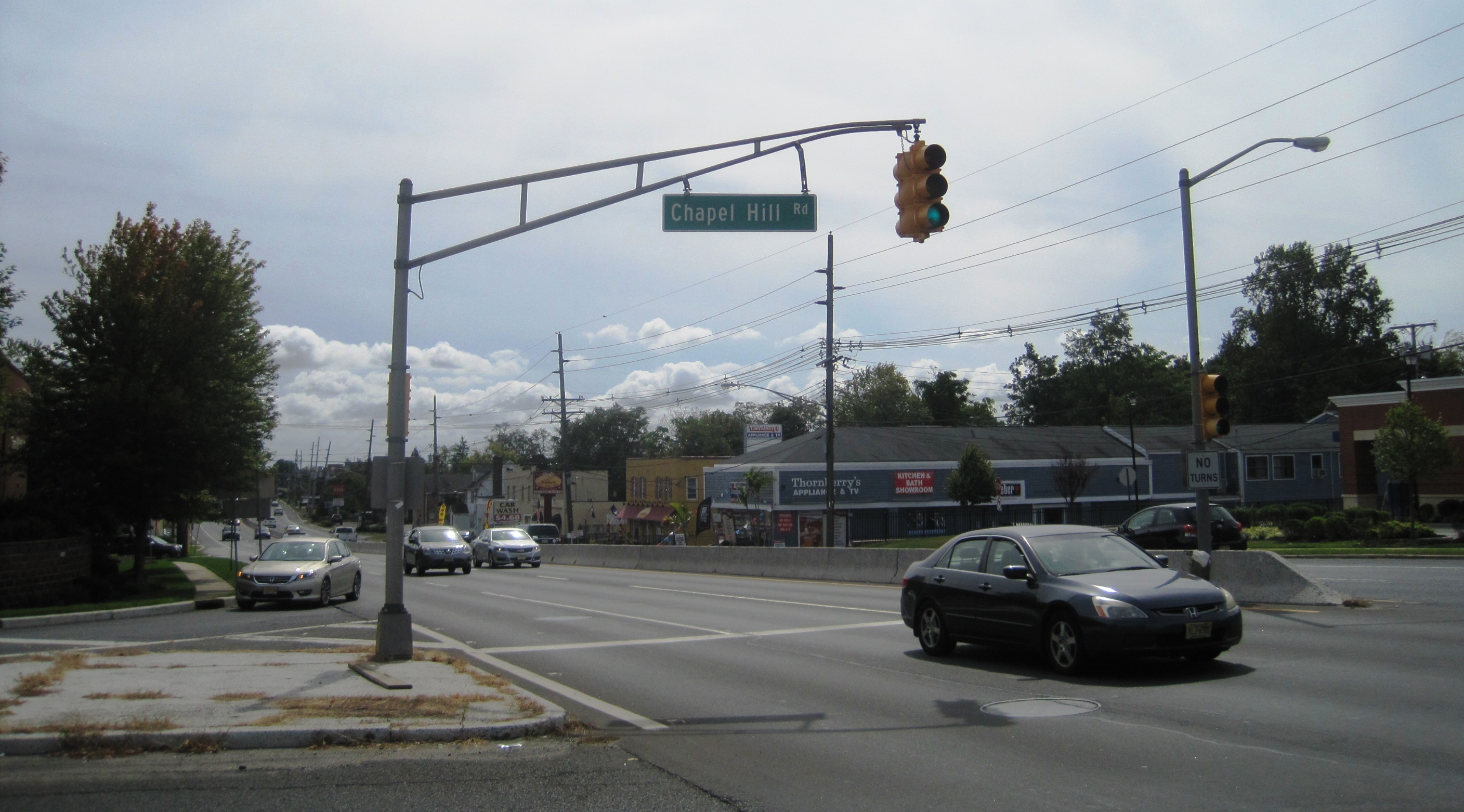
- Looking south along Route 35

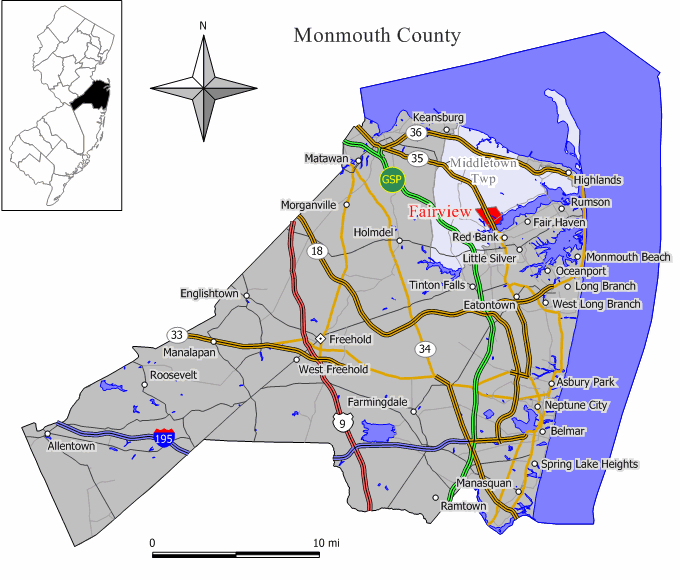
- Map of Fairview CDP in Monmouth County. Inset: Location of Monmouth County in New Jersey.

- Location in Monmouth County Location in New Jersey Location in the United States
- Coordinates: 40.365312°N 74.080588°W
- Country: United States
- State: New Jersey
- County: Monmouth
- Township: Middletown

Area
  - Total: 1.288 sq mi (3.337 km^{2})
  - Land: 1.280 sq mi (3.314 km^{2})
  - Water: 0.0089 sq mi (0.023 km^{2}) 0.69%
- Elevation: 46 ft (14 m)

Population (2020 census)
  - Total: 3,731
  - Density: 2,916/sq mi (1,126/km^{2})
- Time zone: UTC−05:00 (Eastern (EST))
  - Summer (DST): UTC−04:00 (Eastern (EDT))
- ZIP Code: 07701 (Red Bank)
- Area codes: 732/848
- FIPS code: 34-22740
- GNIS feature ID: 02389068

Fairview is an unincorporated community and census-designated place (CDP) in Middletown Township, Monmouth County, New Jersey, United States. As of the 2020 United States census, the CDP's population was 3,731.

== Geography ==
Fairview is in northeastern Monmouth County, occupying the south-central part of Middletown Township. It is bordered to the south by the Navesink River, a tidal estuary. New Jersey Route 35 passes through the community, leading south across the Navesink into the borough of Red Bank and northwest 8 miles (13 km) to Keyport.

According to the U.S. Census Bureau, the Fairview CDP has an area of 1.29 square miles (3.34 km^{2}), including 0.01 square miles (0.03 km^{2}) of water (0.70%).

== Demographics ==
Historical population
Census	Pop.	Note	%±
1950	1,717		—
1990	3,853		—
2000	3,942		2.3%
2010	3,806		−3.5%
2020	3,731		−2.0%
Population sources: 1950 1960 1970; 1980 1990 2000; 2010 2020

The community was listed as an unincorporated community in the 1950 U.S. census under the name Fairview-River Plaza which included the neighboring community of River Plaza. The community was not listed in subsequent censuses until the 1990 U.S. census when it appeared as a census designated place.

=== 2020 census ===
Fairview CDP, New Jersey – Racial and ethnic composition Note: the US Census treats Hispanic/Latino as an ethnic category. This table excludes Latinos from the racial categories and assigns them to a separate category. Hispanics/Latinos may be of any race.
Race / Ethnicity (NH = Non-Hispanic)	Pop 2000	Pop 2010	Pop 2020	% 2000	% 2010	% 2020
White alone (NH)	3,651	3,475	3,230	92.62%	91.30%	86.57%
Black or African American alone (NH)	22	29	24	0.56%	0.76%	0.64%
Native American or Alaska Native alone (NH)	0	0	0	0.00%	0.00%	0.00%
Asian alone (NH)	78	47	67	1.98%	1.23%	1.80%
Native Hawaiian or Pacific Islander alone (NH)	1	1	0	0.03%	0.03%	0.00%
Other race alone (NH)	0	8	17	0.00%	0.21%	0.46%
Mixed race or Multiracial (NH)	30	63	111	0.76%	1.66%	2.98%
Hispanic or Latino (any race)	160	208	282	4.06%	5.47%	7.56%
Total	3,942	3,831	3,731	100.00%	100.00%	100.00%

=== 2010 census ===
The 2010 United States census counted 3,806 people, 1,317 households, and 1,083 families in the CDP. The population density was 2,974.5 per square mile (1,148.5/km^{2}). There were 1,346 housing units at an average density of 1,051.9 per square mile (406.1/km^{2}). The racial makeup was 95.27% (3,626) White, 0.84% (32) Black or African American, 0.00% (0) Native American, 1.23% (47) Asian, 0.05% (2) Pacific Islander, 1.26% (48) from other races, and 1.34% (51) from two or more races. Hispanic or Latino of any race were 5.47% (208) of the population.

Of the 1,317 households, 39.3% had children under the age of 18; 70.2% were married couples living together; 7.2% had a female householder with no husband present and 17.8% were non-families. Of all households, 14.3% were made up of individuals and 6.5% had someone living alone who was 65 years of age or older. The average household size was 2.89 and the average family size was 3.22.

26.2% of the population were under the age of 18, 6.0% from 18 to 24, 25.0% from 25 to 44, 31.8% from 45 to 64, and 10.9% who were 65 years of age or older. The median age was 40.9 years. For every 100 females, the population had 100.1 males. For every 100 females ages 18 and older there were 96.6 males.

=== 2000 census ===
At the 2000 United States census there were 3,942 people, 1,331 households and 1,095 families living in the CDP. The population density was 3,067.7 inhabitants per square mile (1,184.4/km^{2}). There were 1,344 housing units at an average density of 1,045.9 per square mile (403.8/km^{2}). The racial makeup of the CDP was 95.92% White, 0.56% African American, 1.98% Asian, 0.03% Pacific Islander, 0.46% from other races, and 1.07% from two or more races. Hispanic or Latino of any race were 4.06% of the population.

There were 1,331 households, of which 42.5% had children under the age of 18 living with them, 71.5% were married couples living together, 7.7% had a female householder with no husband present, and 17.7% were non-families. 14.0% of all households were made up of individuals, and 6.2% had someone living alone who was 65 years of age or older. The average household size was 2.96 and the average family size was 3.29.

The age distribution was 27.6% under the age of 18, 6.3% from 18 to 24, 31.3% from 25 to 44, 25.0% from 45 to 64, and 9.9% who were 65 years of age or older. The median age was 37 years. For every 100 females, there were 99.9 males. For every 100 females age 18 and over, there were 96.9 males.

The median household income was $81,733, and the median family income was $85,993. Males had a median income of $65,986 versus $31,510 for females. The per capita income was $29,914. About 1.8% of families and 1.8% of the population were below the poverty line, including 2.3% of those under age 18 and 1.3% of those age 65 or over.

== Transportation ==
New Jersey Transit offers local bus service on the 834 route. New Jersey Route 35 is a major highway in Fairview linking the CDP to Red Bank and Keyport.
