= Fairview (Middletown, Delaware) =

Historic house in Delaware, United States

- U.S. National Register of Historic Places
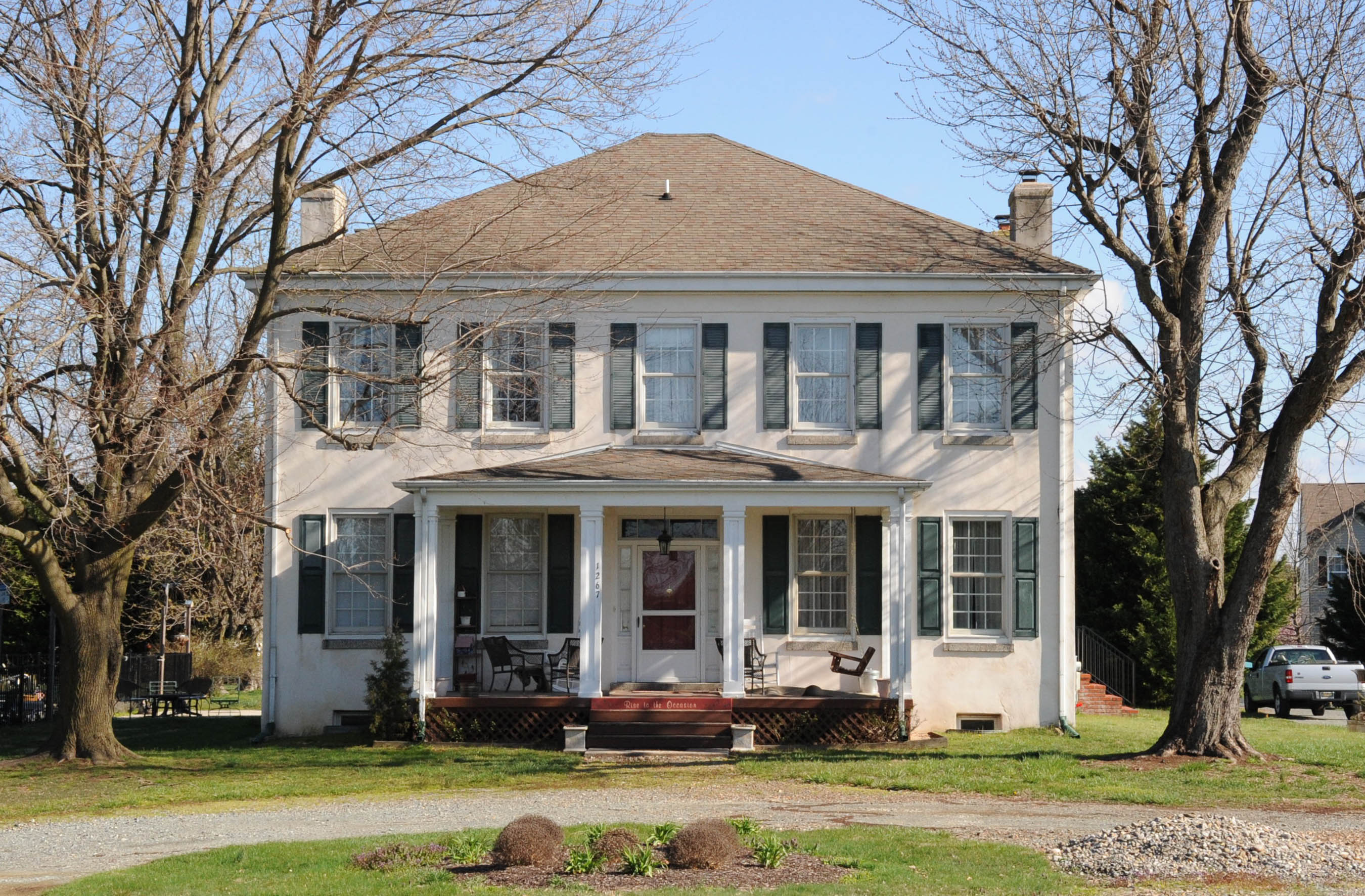

- Location within Delaware Location within the United States
- Location: 3 East Stonewall Drive in Pencader Hundred, Middletown, Delaware
- Coordinates: 39.523868°N 75.762229°W
- Area: 45 acres (18 ha)
- Built: c. 1840
- Architectural style: Greek Revival
- NRHP reference No.: 87001494
- Added to NRHP: September 8, 1987

Fairview, also known as the George Harbert Farm, is a historic home and farm located near Middletown, New Castle County, Delaware. It was built about 1840 and is a two-story, five-bay, stuccoed brick dwelling in a subdued Greek Revival style. It has a hipped roof, a rear wing, and a center-passage plan.

It was listed on the National Register of Historic Places in 1987.
