= Dead Oak Branch =

Stream in Caldwell County, Missouri, US

Coordinates: 39°37′00″N 93°46′28″W

Dead Oak Branch is a stream in Caldwell County in the U.S. state of Missouri.

Dead Oak Branch was named for the dead oak timber along its course.

== See also ==
- List of rivers of Missouri
