= Fairview (Odessa, Delaware, 1850) =

Historic house in Delaware, US

- U.S. National Register of Historic Places
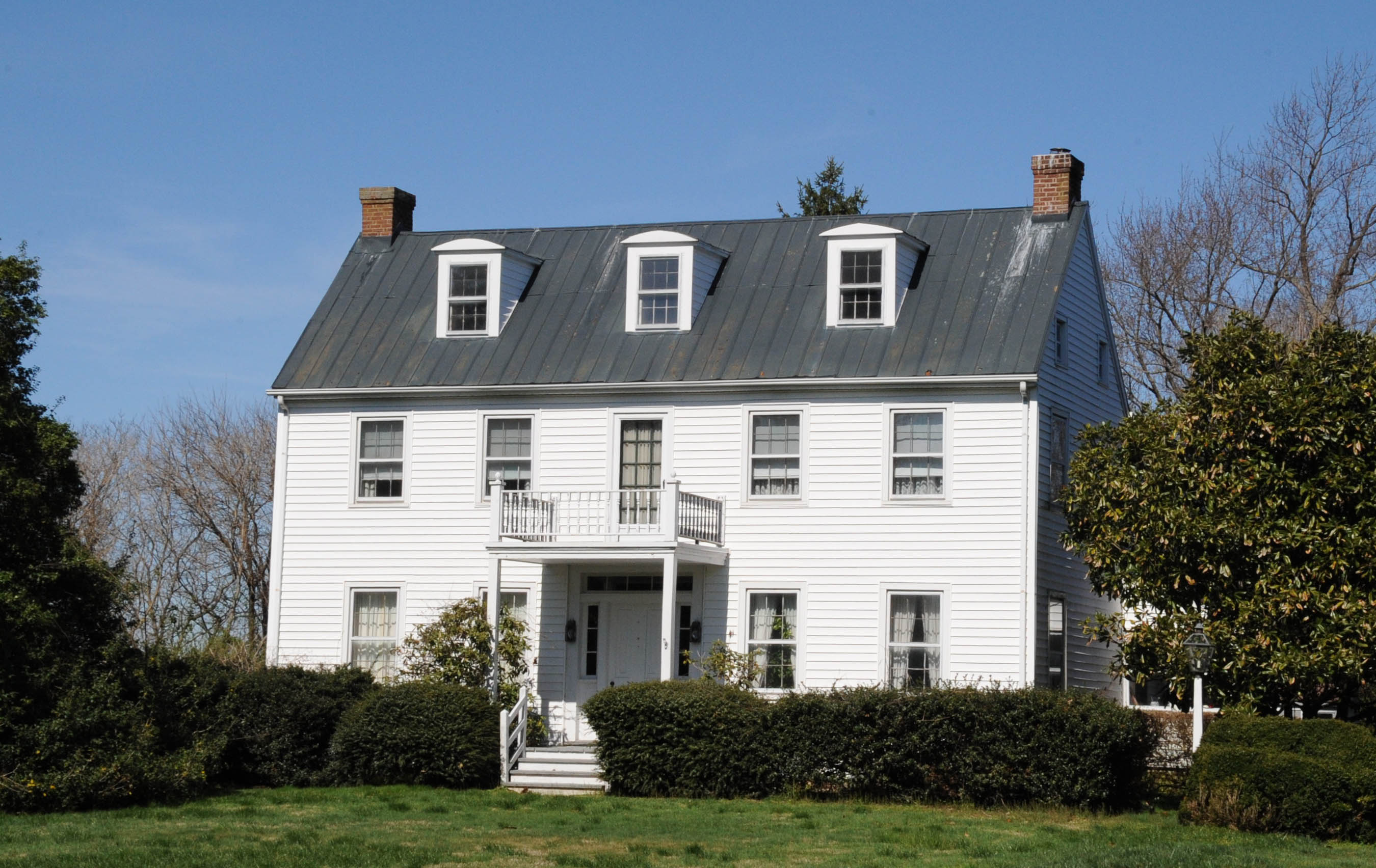

- Location within Delaware Location within the United States
- Location: 781 Lorewood Grove Rd. in St. Georges Hundred, near Odessa, Delaware
- Coordinates: 39.535630°N 75.672800°W
- Area: 3 acres (1.2 ha)
- Built: c. 1850
- Architectural style: Greek Revival, Vernacular Greek Revival
- MPS: Rebuilding St. Georges Hundred 1850-1880 TR
- NRHP reference No.: 85003523
- Added to NRHP: November 19, 1985

Fairview is a historic home located in St. George's Hundred north of Odessa in New Castle County, Delaware. It was built about 1850, and is a 2 1/2-story, five-bay, frame house with a three bay front porch. It has a gable roof with dormers. The house is sheathed in asbestos siding over weatherboard.

It was listed on the National Register of Historic Places in 1985.
