= Fairview, Montgomery County, Maryland =

Unincorporated community in Maryland, U.S.

Coordinates: 39°06′49″N 76°57′10″W

Fairview is an unincorporated community in Montgomery County, Maryland, United States.
