= Fairview, Garrett County, Maryland =

Unincorporated community in Maryland, United States

- Unincorporated community
- Location within Maryland Location within the United States
- Coordinates: 39°35′36″N 79°08′46″W
- Country: United States
- State: Maryland
- County: Garrett
- Elevation: 2,620 ft (800 m)
- Time zone: UTC-5 (Eastern (EST))
  - Summer (DST): UTC-4 (EDT)
- GNIS feature ID: 588654

Fairview is an unincorporated community in Garrett County, Maryland, United States.
