= River Plaza, New Jersey =

Populated place in Monmouth County, New Jersey, US

- Unincorporated community
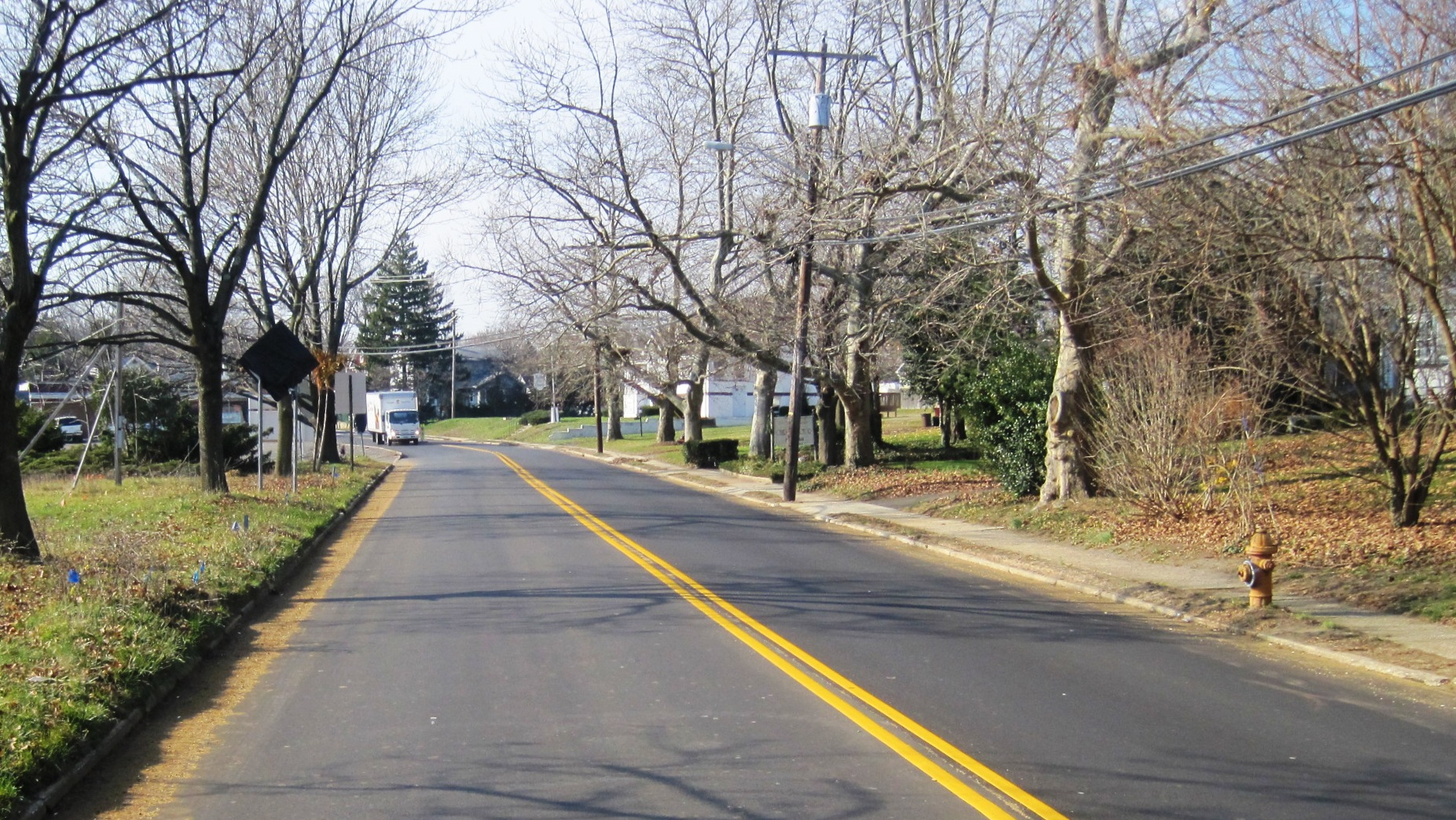
- Looking west along Front Street

- Location of River Plaza in Monmouth County. Inset: Location of county within the state of New Jersey. River; Plaza (New Jersey) River; Plaza (the United States)
- Coordinates: 40°21′16″N 74°05′26″W
- Country: United States
- State: New Jersey
- County: Monmouth
- Township: Middletown
- Elevation: 30 ft (9.1 m)
- Time zone: UTC−05:00 (Eastern (EST))
  - Summer (DST): UTC−04:00 (EDT)
- GNIS feature ID: 882616

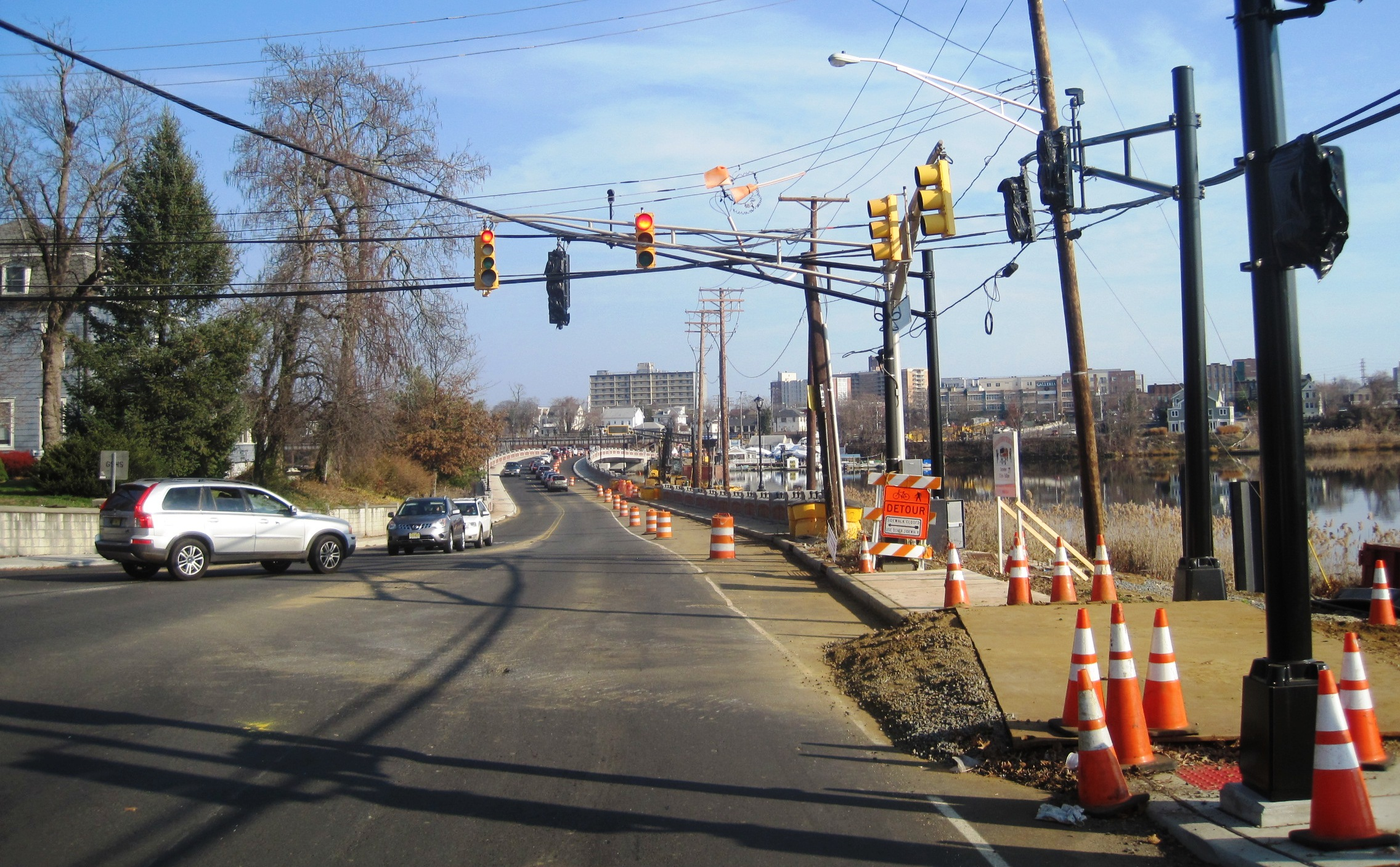
Hubbards Bridge undergoing replacement in December 2015

River Plaza is an unincorporated community located within Middletown Township in Monmouth County, in the U.S. state of New Jersey. It is adjacent to the Navesink River and Shadow Lake.

The settlement is mainly made up of small single-family homes on a peninsula between the river and lake, though parts of the community stretch north of the lake. The community's one elementary school, River Plaza Elementary, is located north of the lake on Hubbard Avenue (County Route 12). The other major road in River Plaza, Front Street, carries CR 10 east of Hubbard Avenue and travels to Red Bank via the Hubbards Bridge over the Navesink River.

== Notable people ==
People who were born in, are residents of, or otherwise closely associated with River Plaza include:

- Peter Dobson (born 1964), actor who had a cameo role in Forrest Gump as Elvis Presley.
- Debbie Harry (born 1945), singer-songwriter and actress, lead singer of the band Blondie.
- Olivia Nuzzi (born 1993), political journalist.
