= Fairview (Delaware City, Delaware) =

Historic house in Delaware, United States

- U.S. National Register of Historic Places
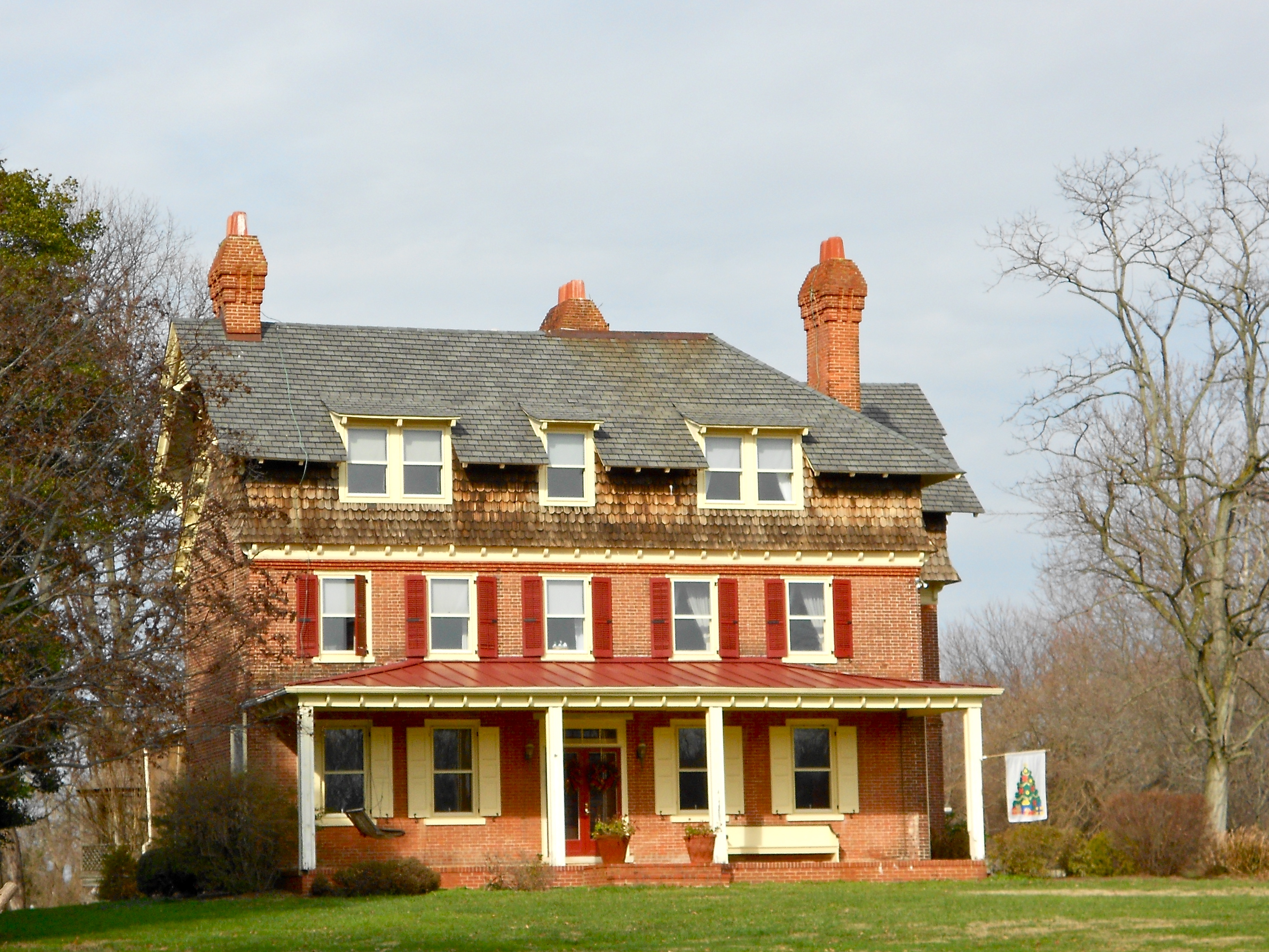
- Fairview, December 2011

- Location within Delaware Location within the United States
- Location: 701 Cox Neck Rd., near Delaware City, Delaware
- Coordinates: 39.563554°N 75.613824°W
- Area: 3 acres (1.2 ha)
- Built: 1822, 1880
- Architect: Frank Furness
- Architectural style: Late Victorian, Georgian, Late 19th Century Eclectic
- MPS: Red Lion Hundred MRA
- NRHP reference No.: 82002326
- Added to NRHP: April 8, 1982

Fairview is a historic home located near Delaware City, New Castle County, Delaware. It was built in 1822 as a two-story, five-bay rectangular brick dwelling with a Georgian style, center hall plan. It was modified in 1880 by architect Frank Furness to add a shingled third story, four notable corbeled chimneys, and an addition.

It was listed on the National Register of Historic Places in 1982.
