= Fairview, Harford County, Maryland =

Unincorporated community in Maryland, U.S.

Coordinates: 39°34′52″N 76°25′17″W

Fairview is an unincorporated community in Harford County, Maryland, United States.
