= Fairview Township =

Fairview Township may refer to:

== Arkansas ==
- Fairview Township, Independence County, Arkansas, in Independence County, Arkansas

== Illinois ==
- Fairview Township, Fulton County, Illinois

== Indiana ==
- Fairview Township, Fayette County, Indiana

== Iowa ==
- Fairview Township, Allamakee County, Iowa
- Fairview Township, Jasper County, Iowa
- Fairview Township, Jones County, Iowa
- Fairview Township, Monona County, Iowa
- Fairview Township, Osceola County, Iowa
- Fairview Township, Shelby County, Iowa, in Shelby County, Iowa

== Kansas ==
- Fairview Township, Barton County, Kansas
- Fairview Township, Butler County, Kansas
- Fairview Township, Cowley County, Kansas
- Fairview Township, Ford County, Kansas
- Fairview Township, Jefferson County, Kansas
- Fairview Township, Labette County, Kansas, in Labette County, Kansas
- Fairview Township, Republic County, Kansas
- Fairview Township, Russell County, Kansas
- Fairview Township, Stafford County, Kansas, in Stafford County, Kansas

== Minnesota ==
- Fairview Township, Cass County, Minnesota
- Fairview Township, Lyon County, Minnesota

== Missouri ==
- Fairview Township, Caldwell County, Missouri
- Fairview Township, Henry County, Missouri
- Fairview Township, Livingston County, Missouri, in Livingston County, Missouri

== Nebraska ==
- Fairview Township, Holt County, Nebraska

== North Carolina ==
- Fairview Township, Buncombe County, North Carolina, in Buncombe County, North Carolina

== North Dakota ==
- Fairview Township, Sheridan County, North Dakota, in Sheridan County, North Dakota

== Pennsylvania ==
- Fairview Township, Butler County, Pennsylvania
- Fairview Township, Erie County, Pennsylvania
- Fairview Township, Luzerne County, Pennsylvania
- Fairview Township, Mercer County, Pennsylvania
- Fairview Township, York County, Pennsylvania

== South Dakota ==
- Fairview Township, Clay County, South Dakota, in Clay County, South Dakota
- Fairview Township, Faulk County, South Dakota, in Faulk County, South Dakota
- Fairview Township, Hanson County, South Dakota, in Hanson County, South Dakota
- Fairview Township, Lincoln County, South Dakota, in Lincoln County, South Dakota
- Fairview Township, Mellette County, South Dakota, in Mellette County, South Dakota
- Fairview Township, Pennington County, South Dakota, in Pennington County, South Dakota
