= Fairview (Odessa, Delaware, 1773) =

Historic house in Delaware, US

- U.S. National Register of Historic Places
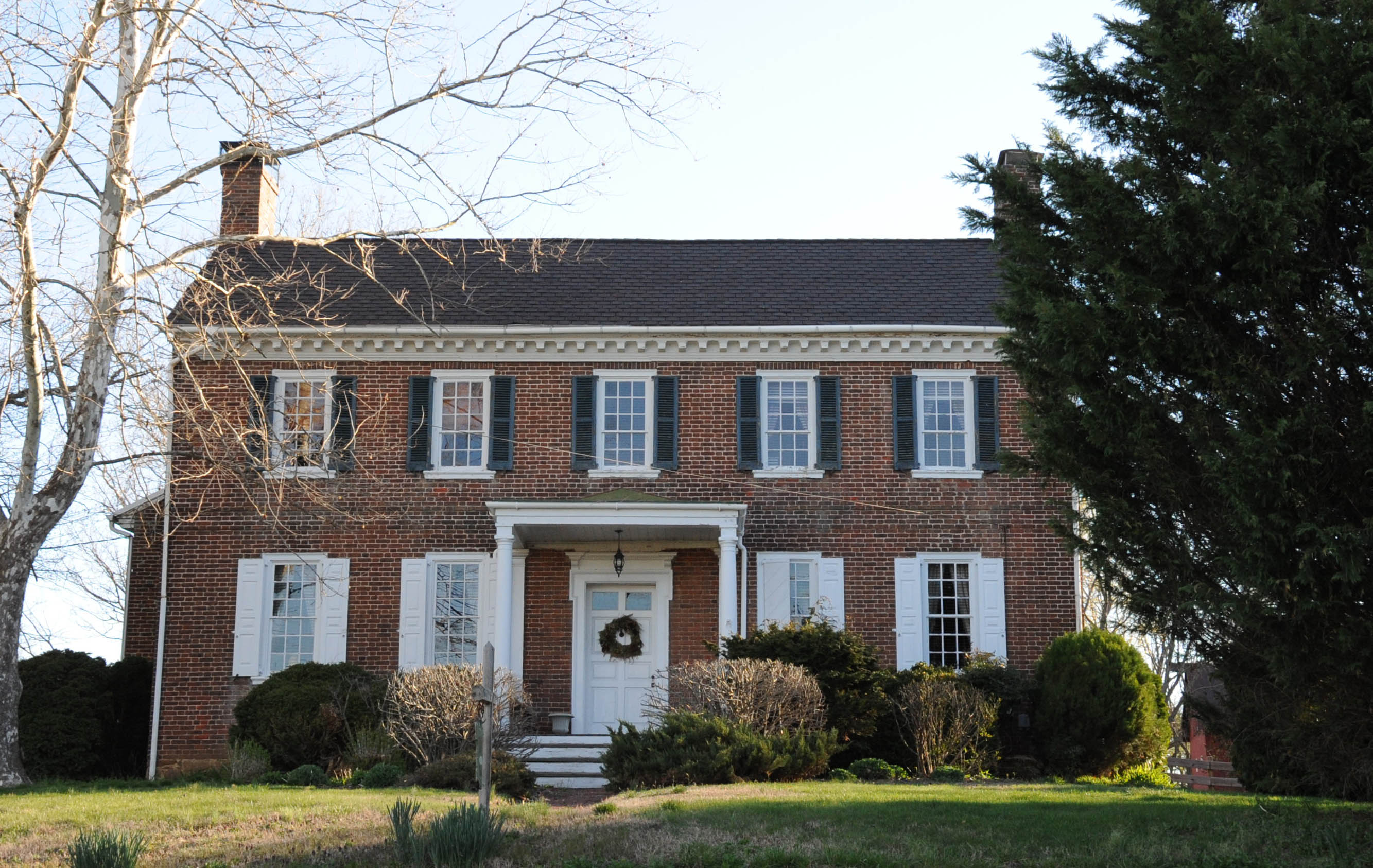

- Location within Delaware Location within the United States
- Location: 602 Old State Rd. in Appoquinimink Hundred, near Odessa, Delaware
- Coordinates: 39.448850°N 75.648132°W
- Area: 5.5 acres (2.2 ha)
- Built: c. 1773
- Architectural style: Georgian
- NRHP reference No.: 84000835
- Added to NRHP: May 3, 1984

Fairview, also known as the Mayor James Moore House, is a historic home located in Appoquinimink Hundred, southeast of Odessa in New Castle County, Delaware. It was built about 1773, and is a two-story, single pile brick dwelling in the Georgian style. It has a gable roof, original rear kitchen ell, and has a center-passage plan.

It was listed on the National Register of Historic Places in 1984.
