= National Register of Historic Places listings in Mineral County, West Virginia =

Location of Mineral County in West Virginia

This is a list of the National Register of Historic Places listings in Mineral County, West Virginia.

This is intended to be a complete list of the properties and districts on the National Register of Historic Places in Mineral County, West Virginia, United States. The locations of National Register properties and districts for which the latitude and longitude coordinates are included below, may be seen in a Google map.

There are 11 properties and districts listed on the National Register in the county.

This National Park Service list is complete through NPS recent listings posted March 21, 2025.

Contents: Counties in West Virginia

Barbour - Berkeley - Boone - Braxton - Brooke - Cabell - Calhoun - Clay - Doddridge - Fayette - Gilmer - Grant - Greenbrier - Hampshire - Hancock - Hardy - Harrison - Jackson - Jefferson - Kanawha - Lewis - Lincoln - Logan - Marion - Marshall - Mason - McDowell - Mercer - Mineral - Mingo - Monongalia - Monroe - Morgan - Nicholas - Ohio - Pendleton - Pleasants - Pocahontas - Preston - Putnam - Raleigh - Randolph - Ritchie - Roane - Summers - Taylor - Tucker - Tyler - Upshur - Wayne - Webster - Wetzel - Wirt - Wood - Wyoming

== Current listings ==
	Name on the Register	Image	Date listed	Location	City or town	Description
1	Burlington Historic District	Burlington Historic District	December 7, 1992 (#92001660)	County Route 11 south from its junction with U.S. Routes 50/220; 39°20′09″N 78°55′06″W	Burlington	
2	Carskadon House	Carskadon House	March 20, 1987 (#87000487)	Route 1, Box 93A, Beaver Run Rd. 39°23′22″N 78°51′01″W	Burlington	
3	Thomas R. Carskadon House	Thomas R. Carskadon House	August 22, 2002 (#02000900)	Carskadon Rd. 39°25′53″N 78°59′15″W	Keyser	
4	Henry Gassaway Davis House	Henry Gassaway Davis House	December 17, 2008 (#08001239)	15-17 Jones St. 39°28′55″N 79°02′56″W	Piedmont	
5	Fairview		December 7, 1992 (#92001631)	Junction of Patterson Creek Dr. and Russelldale Rds. 39°17′59″N 78°56′11″W	Burlington	
6	Fort Ashby	Fort Ashby	December 18, 1970 (#70000657)	South St. 39°30′19″N 78°45′57″W	Fort Ashby	
7	Fort Hill	Fort Hill	January 9, 1997 (#96001569)	Patterson Creek Rd., approximately 1.5 mi (2.4 km) south of junction with U.S. Routes 50/220; 39°18′37″N 78°56′08″W	Burlington	
8	Mineral County Courthouse	Mineral County Courthouse	September 7, 2005 (#05001005)	150 Armstrong St. 39°26′24″N 78°58′24″W	Keyser	
9	Stewart's Tavern	Stewart's Tavern	July 14, 2000 (#00000776)	Short Gap Rd. 39°32′38″N 78°48′44″W	Short Gap	
10	Travelers Rest	Travelers Rest	July 26, 2006 (#06000655)	1 mi (1.6 km) east of Ridgeville on U.S. Route 50; 39°20′25″N 78°58′37″W	Burlington	
11	Vandiver-Trout-Clause House	Vandiver-Trout-Clause House	May 29, 1979 (#79002592)	U.S. Routes 50/220; 39°20′59″N 78°59′33″W	Ridgeville	

== See also ==
- List of National Historic Landmarks in West Virginia
- National Register of Historic Places listings in West Virginia
