= Burlington =

Burlington may refer to:

== Places ==
=== Canada ===
==== Populated places ====
- Burlington, Newfoundland and Labrador
- Burlington, Nova Scotia
- Burlington, Ontario, the most populous city with the name Burlington
- Burlington, Prince Edward Island
- Burlington Bay, now known as Hamilton Harbour, Ontario

==== Electoral districts ====
- Burlington (federal electoral district), in Ontario, Canada
- Burlington (provincial electoral district), in Ontario, Canada
- Burlington South (provincial electoral district), in Ontario, Canada

=== England ===
- Bridlington in Yorkshire, previously known as Burlington
- Burlington (UK), a codename for the Central Government War Headquarters underground complex
- Burlington, a small hamlet in East Shropshire lying along the A5 road near Telford, Shropshire, UK
- Burlington Estate, Mayfair, London, UK
- Burlington House, Mayfair, London, UK

=== United States ===
==== Populated places ====
- Burlington, Colorado
- Burlington, Connecticut
- Burlington, Illinois
- Burlington, Indiana
- Burlington, Iowa
- Burlington, Kansas
- Burlington, Kentucky
- Burlington, Maine
- Burlington, Massachusetts
- Burlington, Michigan
- Burlington, New Jersey
- Burlington, New York
- Burlington, North Carolina, the most populous city in the U.S. with this name
- Burlington, North Dakota
- Burlington, Ohio, a census-designated place in Lawrence County
- Burlington, Fulton County, Ohio, an unincorporated community
- Bristol, Ohio an unincorporated community in Perry County, originally known as Burlington
- Burlington, Oklahoma
- Burlington, Linn County, Oregon
- Burlington, Multnomah County, Oregon
- Burlington, Pennsylvania
- Burlington, Texas
- Burlington, Vermont, most populous city in Vermont
- Burlington, Washington
- Burlington, West Virginia
- Burlington (city), Wisconsin
- Burlington (town), Wisconsin
- Burlington, Wyoming
- Burlington County, New Jersey
- Burlington Flats, New York
- South Burlington, Vermont

==== Buildings ====
- Burlington (Nashville, Tennessee), a demolished historic mansion
- Burlington (Barboursville, Virginia), a historic plantation house
- Burlington (Petersburg, Virginia), a historic plantation house

==== Other places in the United States ====
- Burlington College, in Burlington, Vermont

== Brands and enterprises ==
- Burlington (department store), an American department store retailer formerly known as Burlington Coat Factory
- Burlington Arcade, a covered shopping arcade in London
- Burlington Cars, a British motor vehicle manufacturer
- Burlington College, in Burlington, Vermont
- Burlington Company, a group of eight investors from Burlington, New Jersey that were active in the 1770s
- Burlington Industries, a diversified American fabric maker
- Burlington Northern Santa Fe Corporation, an American railroad
- Burlington Resources, an American oil and gas company that was acquired by ConocoPhillips in 2006
- Burlington Slate Quarries, a British quarry that produces a characteristic blue grey slate

== Arts, entertainment, and media ==
- "Burlington Bertie", an English music hall song of 1900 associated with Vesta Tilley
- Burlington Post, the local newspaper of Burlington, Ontario, Canada
- The Burlington Free Press, the daily newspaper of Burlington, Vermont, U.S.
- The Burlington Magazine, a monthly magazine

== Sports ==
- Burlington Bees, an American Class A minor league baseball team
- Burlington Braves, a Canadian junior football league team
- Burlington Chiefs, a Canadian junior "A" box lacrosse team
- Burlington Cougars, a Canadian Tier II Junior "A" ice hockey team
- Burlington Royals, an American minor league baseball team

== Transportation ==
=== Bus and rail stations ===
- Burlington GO Station, a train and bus station in Burlington, Ontario, Canada
- Burlington station (Iowa), an Amtrak station
- Burlington station (North Carolina), an Amtrak station
- Burlington Union Station (Vermont), a rail station serving Vermont Railway and Amtrak

=== Ships ===
- HMS Burlington, the name of two ships of the Royal Navy
- USS Burlington (PF-51), a US Navy patrol frigate in commission from 1944 to 1945 and from 1951 to 1952
- HMCS Burlington, a Bangor-class minesweeper constructed for the Royal Canadian Navy during the Second World War

=== Other uses in transportation ===
- Burlington Bay James N. Allan Skyway, a bridge between the Ontario municipalities of Burlington and Hamilton in Canada
- Burlington Cars, a British motor vehicle manufacturer
- Burlington Executive Airport, in Burlington, Ontario, Canada
- Burlington International Airport, the largest airport in Vermont
- Burlington Street (Hamilton, Ontario), an expressway/arterial road in Canada
- Burlington Transit, a public transit agency in Burlington, Ontario, Canada
- Chicago, Burlington and Quincy Railroad, a railroad that operated in the midwestern US, one of the predecessors of the BNSF railroad

== Other uses ==
- Chobham armour, a type of vehicle armour also known as Burlington
- Earl of Burlington, a title in the peerage of the UK

== See also ==
- Burlington Historic District (disambiguation)
- Burlington Junction (disambiguation)
- Burlington Mall (disambiguation)
- Burlington Township (disambiguation)
- New Burlington, Ohio (disambiguation)
- West Burlington (disambiguation)
