= Burlington Historic District =

Burlington Historic District may refer to:

in the United States (by state)

- Burlington-Harmony Hill Roads Historic District, Harwinton, Connecticut, listed on the National Register of Historic Places in Litchfield County, Connecticut
- Burlington Historic District (Burlington, Kentucky), listed on the National Register of Historic Places in Boone County, Kentucky
- Burlington Historic District (Burlington, New Jersey), listed on the National Register of Historic Places in Burlington County, New Jersey
- Downtown Burlington Historic District, Burlington, North Carolina, listed on the National Register of Historic Places in Alamance County, North Carolina
- Burlington Historic District (Burlington, West Virginia), listed on the National Register of Historic Places in Mineral County, West Virginia
- Burlington Downtown Historic District, Burlington, Wisconsin, listed on the National Register of Historic Places in Racine County, Wisconsin

== See also ==
- Burlington (disambiguation)
