= Cowperthwaite =

Cowperthwaite is a locational surname of English origin, which meant a person from a village in Yorkshire, whose name derives from the Middle English coupere ("maker of wooden buckets and tubs") + thweit ("clearing"), from Old Norse thveit).

Notable people with the surname include:

- Colin Cowperthwaite (born 1959), English footballer
- Gabriela Cowperthwaite (born 1971), American filmmaker
- John James Cowperthwaite (1915–2006), English civil servant, Financial Secretary of Hong Kong from 1961 to 1971
- John Cowperthwaite, English kit car designer
- Nancy Cowperthwaite-Phillips (1921–2017), American track and field athlete
- Niall Cowperthwaite (born 1992), English footballer
