= Burlington metropolitan area =

The Burlington metropolitan area may refer to:

- The Burlington, Vermont metropolitan area, United States
- The Burlington, North Carolina metropolitan area, United States
- The Burlington, Iowa micropolitan area, United States

== See also ==
- Burlington (disambiguation)
