= Burlington Township, Michigan =

Burlington Township is the name of some places in the U.S. state of Michigan:

- Burlington Township, Calhoun County, Michigan
- Burlington Township, Lapeer County, Michigan

== See also ==
- Burlington, Michigan, a village in Calhoun County
- Burlington Township (disambiguation)
