= Weaver's Antique Service Station =

- Weaver's Garage
- U.S. Historic district – Contributing property
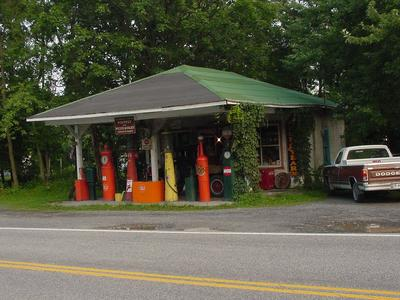
- Weaver's Garage along U.S. 50, in 2005

- Location within Eastern Panhandle of West Virginia Location within West Virginia Location within the United States
- Location: U.S. Route 50, Burlington, West Virginia
- Coordinates: 39.33761°N 78.91895°W
- Architectural style: Vernacular
- Part of: Burlington Historic District (ID92001660)
- Designated CP: December 7, 1992

Weaver's Antique Service Station is a gas station built in c.1930, which is restored and still evocative of the 1930s, located in Burlington, West Virginia on Northwestern Turnpike (also known as U.S. Route 50), near its intersection with Patterson Creek Road.

It is listed on the National Register of Historic Places as a contributing building within the Burlington Historic District. It is a vernacular wood-frame building, with stucco plaster over 1/8 inch wire mesh. A wood outbuilding, built c.1900, is included in the property, which in 1992 served as a museum of local historical artifacts. It is located on the south side of U.S. Route 50.

== See also ==
- List of historic filling stations
