= HMS Burlington =

Three ships of the Royal Navy have borne the name HMS Burlington:

- HMS Burlington (1695) was a 48-gun fourth rate launched in 1695 and broken up in 1733.
- HMS Burlington was a 42-gun fifth rate built as HMS Vittoria but launched in 1814 as HMS Princess Charlotte. She was renamed Burlington later that year, and put up for sale in 1833.
- HMS Burlington was a collier built in 1921 for the Gas Light and Coke Company. In 1940 the Admiralty commissioned her as HMS Burlington to destroy naval mines. She was renamed Soothsayer and then Fairfax. Under her final name she served as a repair ship. She was decommissioned and scrapped in 1945.

== See also ==
- HMCS Burlington
