= Twin Mountain and Potomac Railroad =

Former narrow gauge railway in West Virginia

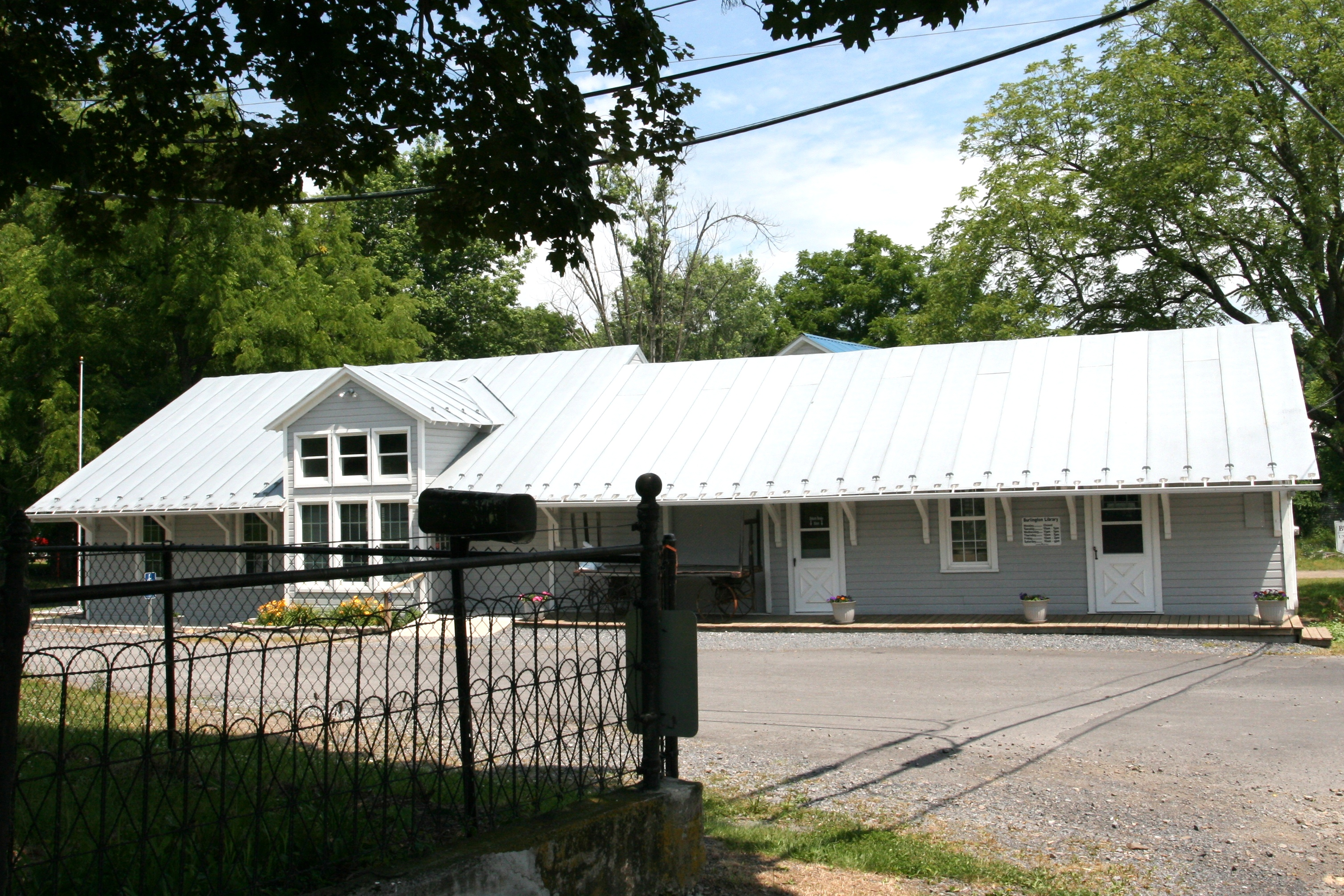
The former Twin Mountain and Potomac Railroad Station in Burlington, West Virginia

The Twin Mountain and Potomac Railroad was built in 1911 to haul fruit from Twin Mountain Orchards to Keyser, West Virginia. It was a 3 ft (914 mm) narrow gauge railroad which ran for 26.6 miles (42.8 km). Freight was transferred to the Baltimore and Ohio Railroad at Keyser. Service was discontinued c. 1919 and the rails were taken up in 1921. The Burlington, West Virginia train station survives and is now used as a branch of the Mineral County Library.
