= West Burlington =

West Burlington may refer to:

- West Burlington, Iowa, United States
- West Burlington, New York, United States

== See also ==
- Burlington (disambiguation)
- South Burlington
- West Burlington Township
