= Burlington Junction =

Burlington Junction may refer to:

- Burlington Junction, Missouri, a city in the United States
- Burlington Junction Railway, a railroad in Iowa, United States

== See also ==
- Burlington (disambiguation)
