= Ridgeville, West Virginia =

Ridgeville
- Unincorporated community
- Location within the state of West Virginia Ridgeville (the United States)
- Coordinates: 39°20′54″N 78°59′26″W
- Country: United States
- State: West Virginia
- County: Mineral
- Elevation: 1,030 ft (310 m)
- Time zone: UTC-5 (Eastern (EST))
  - Summer (DST): UTC-4 (EDT)
- GNIS feature ID: 1545581

Ridgeville is an unincorporated community in Mineral County, West Virginia, United States. It lies along U.S. Routes 50 and 220 (the "Northwestern Turnpike") in the Mill Creek Valley, west of Markwood.

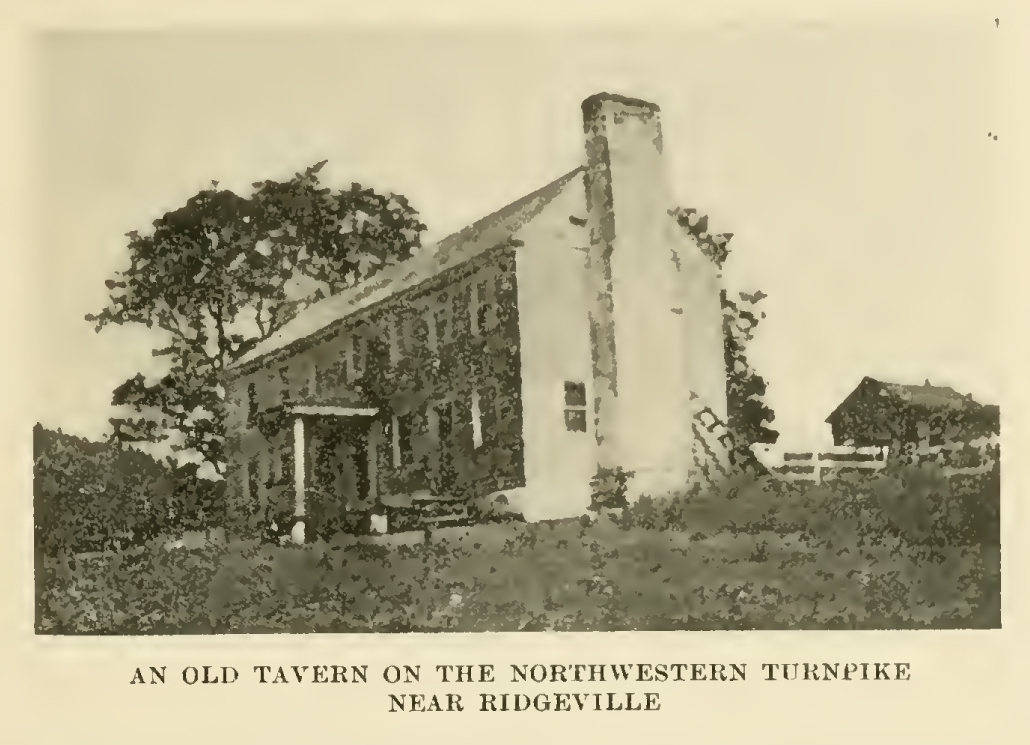
Tavern along Northwestern Turnpike near Ridgeville, WV, circa 1908

The Vandiver-Trout-Clause House was listed on the National Register of Historic Places in 1979.
