= New Burlington, Ohio =

There are two communities named New Burlington in Ohio, the United States:

- New Burlington, Clinton County, Ohio, a former village
- New Burlington, Hamilton County, Ohio, a census-designated place
