= Burlington Cars =

British motor vehicle manufacturer

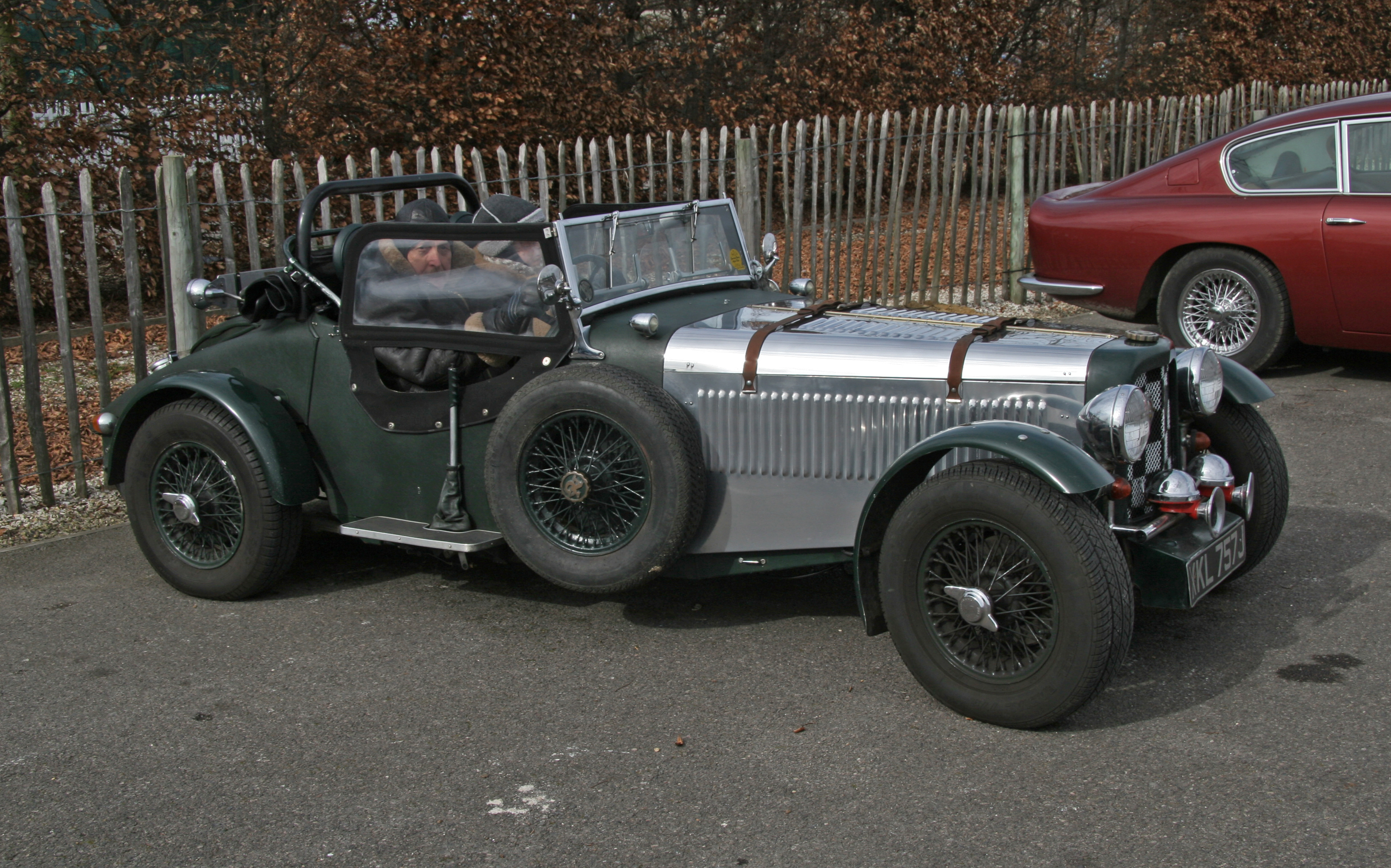
Burlington Arrow

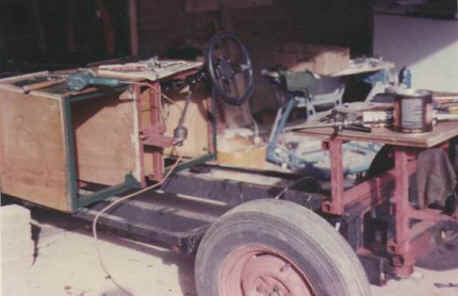
Burlington being built, based on a Triumph Herald 1200.

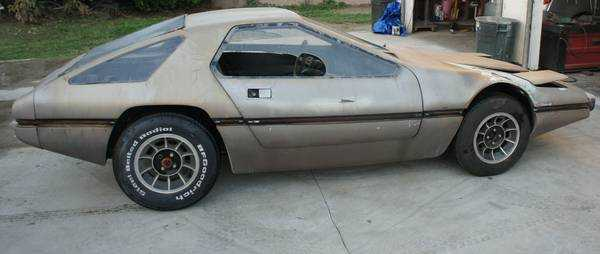
The 'Urba' Centurion that featured in a 1982 issue of Mechanix Illustrated and appeared in the film Total Recall. (Photographed in 2013)

Burlington Cars was a British kit car company originally based in Leamington Spa, Warwickshire. They moved to Northampton in 1988 becoming the Burlington Motor Company reforming as the Burlington Design Group in 1989. Kit production seems to have stopped in around 1992. Founded by Haydn Davis the cars were at first of the "plan and pattern" car type similar to the JC Midge. Like the Midge it uses a Triumph donor and constructs a body of plywood on top of it, i.e. a body-on-frame design.

As of 2008, the plans have been made available again for home constructors.

Reg of photo car shows as an NG kit

== Burlington car models ==
- Burlington SS, a Morgan copy, later sold as Dorian SS.

The early SS had no doors and only the top flat parts of the bonnet halves opened. The SS MK2 was provided with doors and full opening bonnet halves. It could also be built as a 4 seater.

- Burlington Arrow, a two-seat, doorless roadster with cycle wings (based on the MG TC) inspired by the 1935 Triumph Dolomite Straight Eight. Built according to plans and using a modified chassis from a Triumph Herald. Later chassis plans were made so it could be built using parts from Triumph Spitfire, Vitesse, or GT6. Over 6000 copies of the plans were sold resulting in an estimated 500 cars built. Some using donors such as Lotus Elan, Triumph TR4, Reliant Scimitar and even the Volkswagen Beetle. Burlington also made the radiator surround (nose cone) and scuttle top, but about half of the builders made their own instead of buying them.
- Burlington Berretta, same as the Arrow, but with fixed wings and running boards.
- Burlington Chieftain, World War II style Jeep also on Triumph Spitfire or GT6 chassis. The design did not require any alterations on the chassis except for cutting some parts off. The plans also allowed you to scale it down and make one for the kids.
- Burlington Centurion, a futuristic Triumph Spitfire based car designed by the American Quincy-Lynn company.
