= Carskadon House =

Historic house in West Virginia, United States

- U.S. National Register of Historic Places
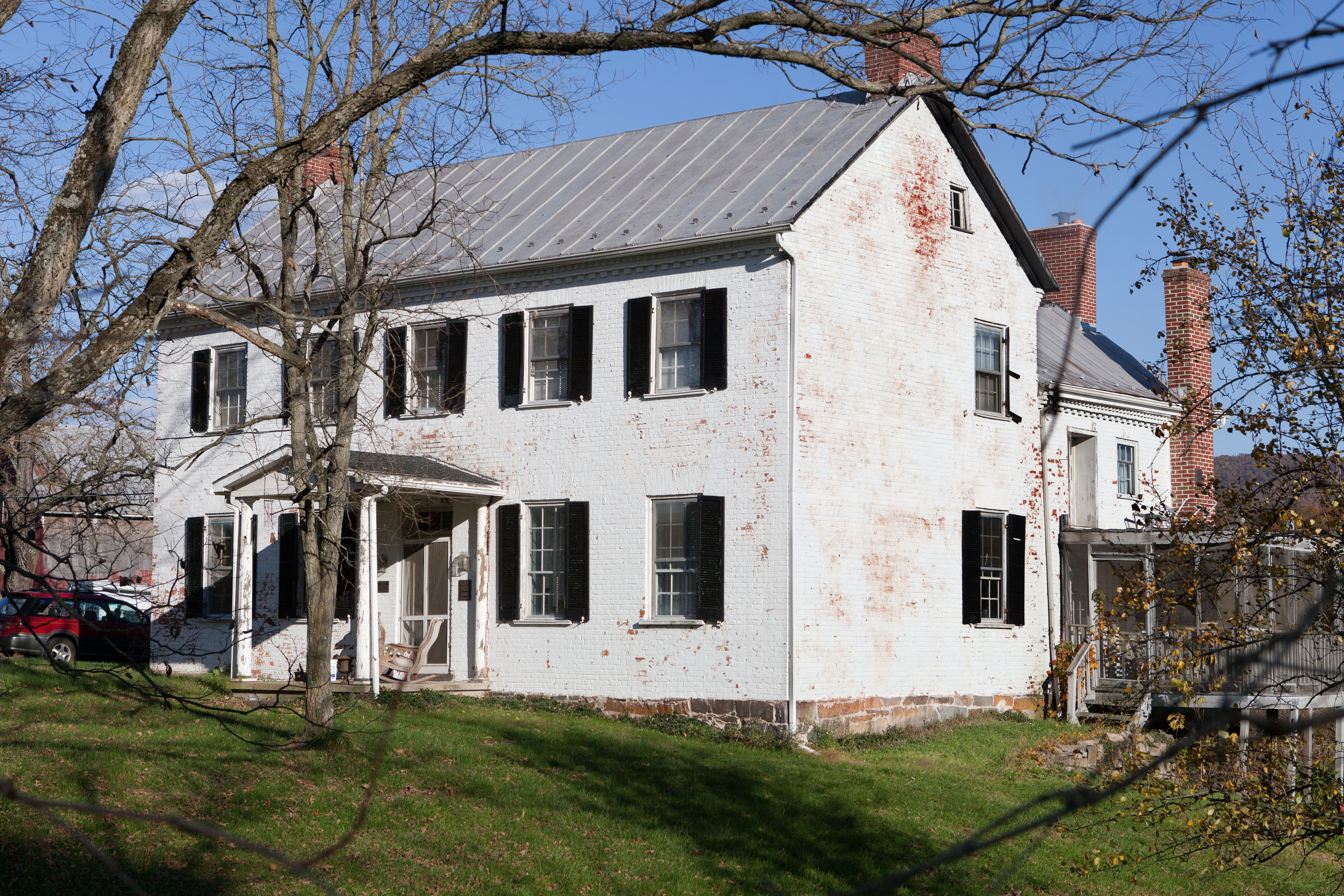

- Location within Eastern Panhandle of West Virginia Location within West Virginia Location within the United States
- Location: Route 1, Box 93A, Beaver Run Rd., near Burlington, West Virginia
- Coordinates: 39°23′22″N 78°51′1″W
- Area: 9 acres (3.6 ha)
- Built: 1821
- Architectural style: Federal
- NRHP reference No.: 87000487
- Added to NRHP: March 20, 1987

Carskadon House also known as the "Locust Grove" and "Radical Hill," is a historic home located near Burlington, Mineral County, West Virginia. It was built in 1821, and is a two-story rectangular, side-gabled brick dwelling in a vernacular Federal style. It sits on a granite foundation and has a two-story rear ell. It features a one-story, Greek Revival style entrance portico. Also on the property are a contributing granary, scale house and barn.

It was listed on the National Register of Historic Places in 1987.
