= Fort Hill (Burlington, West Virginia) =

Historic house in West Virginia, United States

- U.S. National Register of Historic Places
- U.S. Historic district
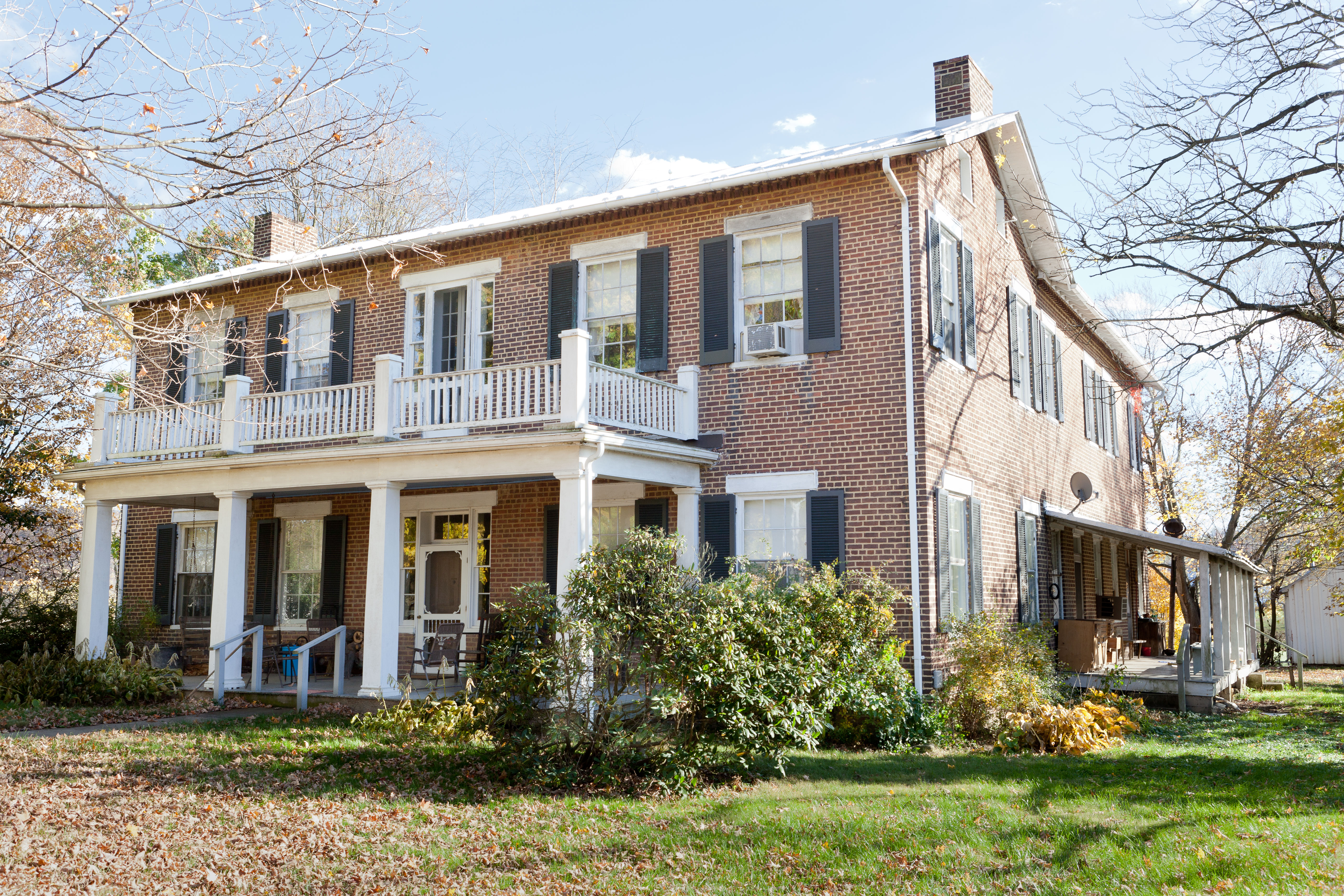

- Location within Eastern Panhandle of West Virginia Location within West Virginia Location within the United States
- Location: Patterson Creek Rd., approximately 1.5 mi (2.4 km) south of junction with U.S. Routes 50/220, near Burlington, West Virginia
- Coordinates: 39°18′37″N 78°56′8″W
- Area: 240 acres (97 ha)
- Built: 1853
- Architectural style: Federal
- NRHP reference No.: 96001569
- Added to NRHP: January 9, 1997

Fort Hill, also known as Fort Hill Farm, is a historic plantation house and national historic district located near Burlington, Mineral County, West Virginia. The district includes 15 contributing buildings, 1 contributing site, and 2 contributing structures. The main house was completed in 1853, and is a two-story, L-shaped brick dwelling composed of a side-gable-roofed, five-bay building with a rear extension in the Federal style. It features a three-bay, one-story front porch supported by 4 one-foot-square Tuscan order columns. Also on the property are a number of contributing buildings including a washhouse and cellar, outhouse, a dairy and ice house, a meat house, a garage, a hog house, poultry houses, a bank barn with silo, and a well. The family cemetery is across the road west of the main house. Located nearby and in the district is "Woodside," a schoolhouse built about 1890, and a tenant house and summer kitchen.

It was listed on the National Register of Historic Places in 1996.
