= Burlington Mall =

Burlington Mall may refer to the following shopping malls:

- Burlington Mall (Massachusetts) in Burlington, Massachusetts, U.S.
- Burlington Centre (formerly Burlington Mall) in Burlington, Ontario, Canada

See also:

- Burlington Center in Burlington Township, New Jersey, U.S.
- Holly Hill Mall and Business Center (formerly Burlington Square Mall), Burlington, North Carolina, U.S.
- Burlington Town Center (formerly Burlington Square Mall) in Burlington, Vermont, U.S.
