= Travelers Rest (Burlington, West Virginia) =

Historic house in West Virginia, United States

- U.S. National Register of Historic Places
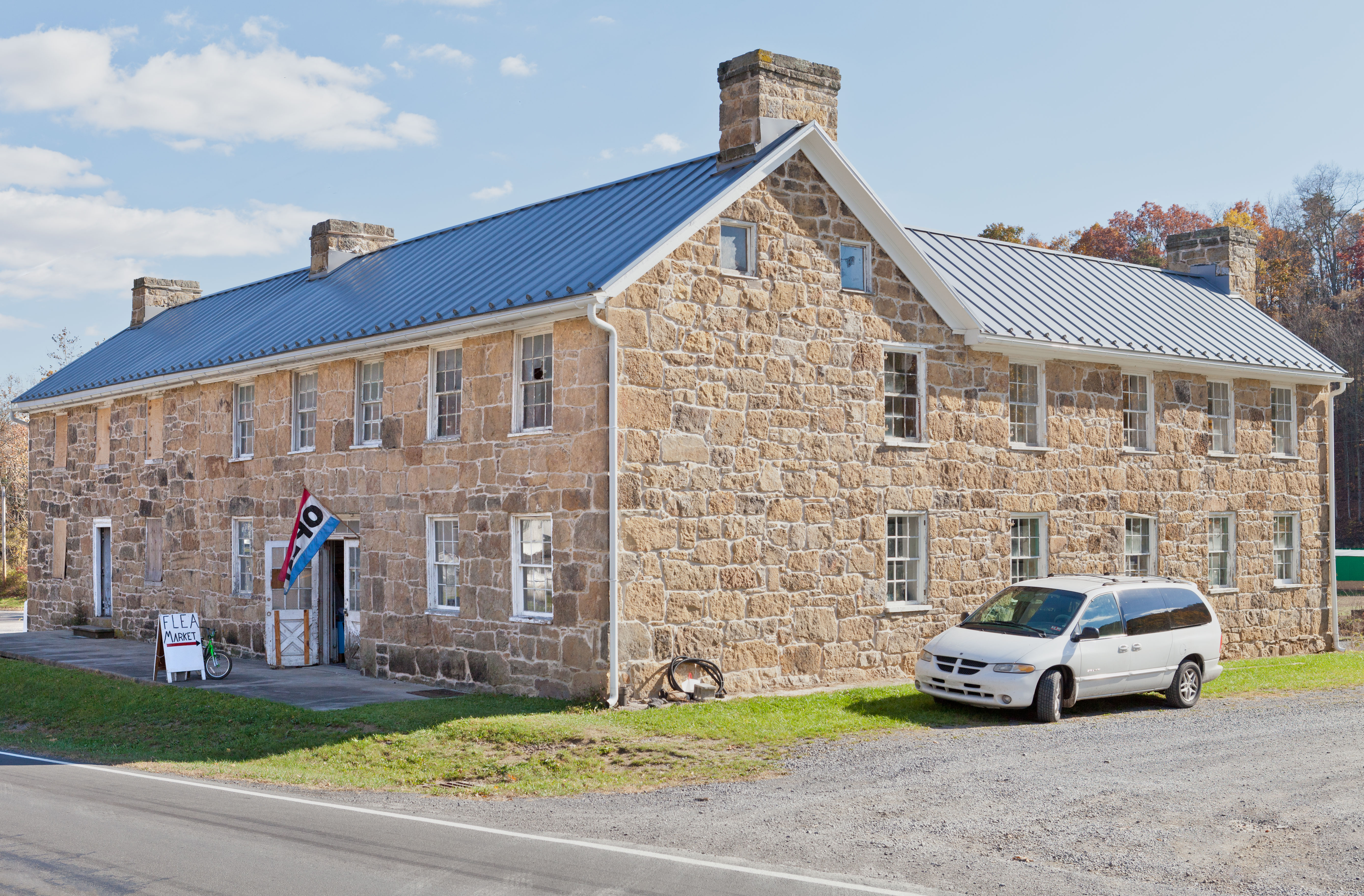

- Location within Eastern Panhandle of West Virginia Location within West Virginia Location within the United States
- Location: 1 mi (1.6 km) east of Ridgeville on U.S. Route 50, near Burlington, West Virginia
- Coordinates: 39°20′24″N 78°58′38″W
- Area: 1.4 acres (0.57 ha)
- Built: 1828
- Architectural style: Greek Revival
- NRHP reference No.: 06000655
- Added to NRHP: July 26, 2006

Travelers Rest, also known as Old Stone House, is a historic home located near Burlington, Mineral County, West Virginia. It was built as a stagecoach stop to service the Northwestern Turnpike. It serviced the corridor between Winchester, Virginia and Parkersburg, Virginia (now West Virginia). The house is believed to have been built in two phases, in 1827 or as early as 1810, and is a stone, Ell-shaped building executed in a vernacular adaptation of the Greek Revival style.

The property is now owned by The Mineral County Historical Foundation. It is being restored and will house artisans and shops for current travelers on U.S. Route 50.

It was listed on the National Register of Historic Places in 2006.
