= JC Midge =

British kit car

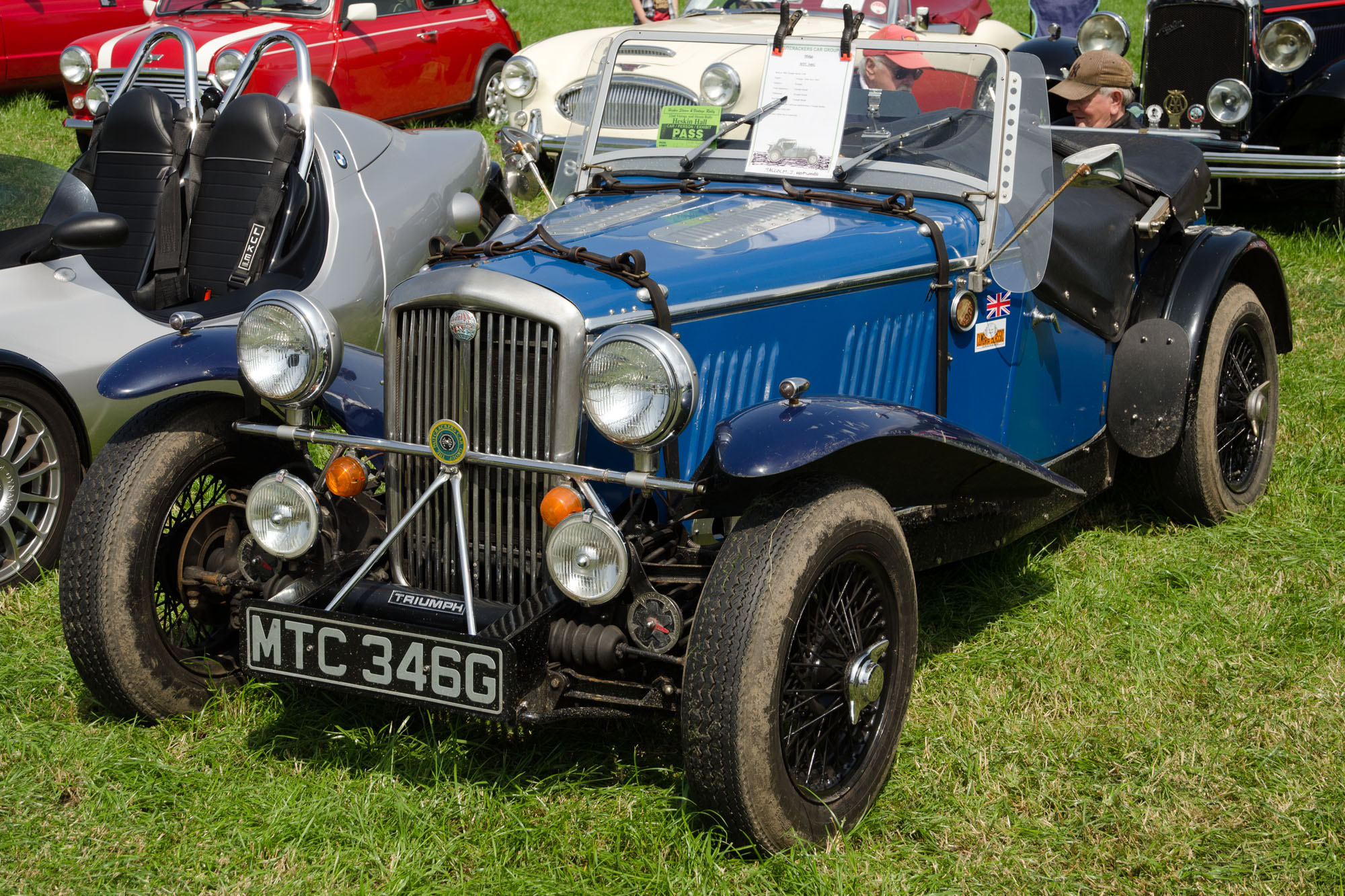
Midge probably based on a 1968 "donor" car.

JC Midge is a hand built car i.e. a "plan and pattern" car designed by John Cowperthwaite.

== Design ==
Similar to the Locust, the body is made of aluminium skinned plywood or MDF and using a purpose made grille or one from a donor, such as a Wolseley 1500 (but many other have been used). Unlike a Kit car only a few parts were available, the rest being from the donor car or hand made by the builder by sticking paper patterns on plywood or aluminium and cutting around them with a jigsaw. The starting point was a set of patterns and instructions costing £35 and the designer claimed it was possible to put a car on the road for £800.

The design is inspired of British 1930s cars like the MG J2 Midget and similar to the Burlington in both design and construction. Originally it was essentially a re-body of the Triumph Herald, Vitesse or Spitfire.

== History ==
It was first presented in 1985 by J.C. Sports Cars in Sheffield, England run by John Cowperthwaite and founded after his earlier company called Moss had its factory destroyed in a fire in 1985. Later marketing and development of the Midge was taken over by T&J of Rotherham and they continued into the mid-1990s. It was then taken over by White Rose Vehicles in Gillingham, Kent. WRV also constructed their own chassis that took Ford Escort (with Ford Cortina or Ford Taunus (1976–1982) front suspension) parts instead using a Triumph chassis. When White Rose Vehicles ceased trading some club members raised the money to buy the rights to market the car. As it is plan-based the Midge has also been built using various donors including the Citroën 2CV.

An updated version, the Midge Mk2, for which the donor car is the Suzuki SJ is now available (2014) with the original principle of plans and pattern and a minimum of 'kit' elements. Being a re-body it is in the United Kingdom exempt from IVA (Individual Vehicle Approval).

It is not known how many have been built.
