= HMS Princess Charlotte (1814) =

Frigate of the Royal Navy

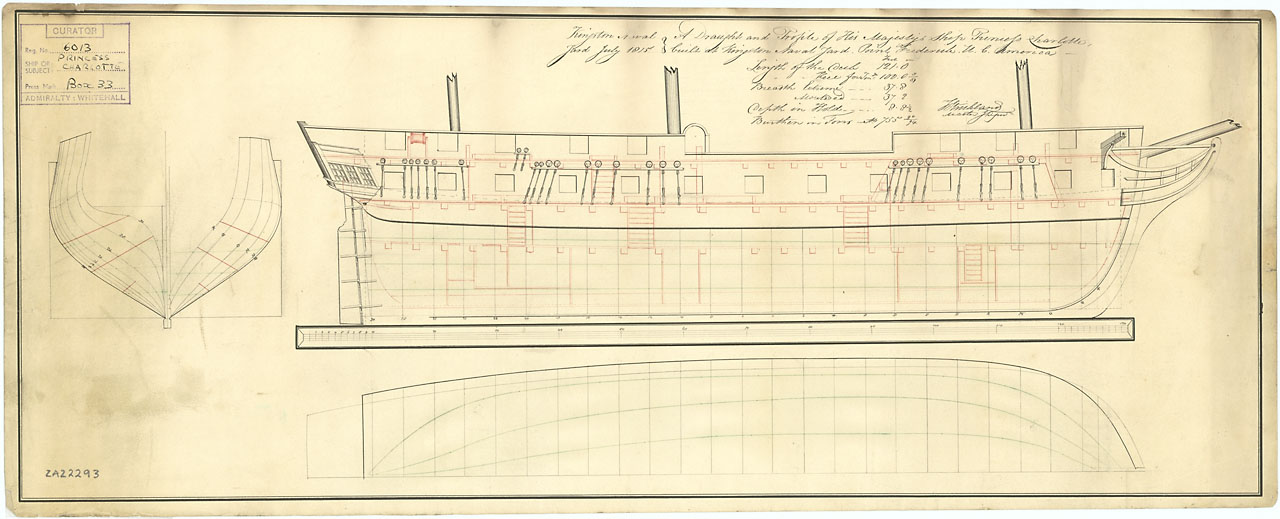
- Drawing showing the body plan, sheer lines with inboard detail, and longitudinal half-breadth for Princess Charlotte, 1815

History

United Kingdom
- Name: Princess Charlotte
- Ordered: 1813
- Builder: Kingston Royal Naval Dockyard, Kingston
- Launched: 14 April 1814
- Commissioned: 5 May 1814
- Renamed: Built as Vittoria; Renamed Burlington on 9 December 1814
- Fate: Put up for sale in January 1833; Later scuttled

General characteristics
- Type: 42-gun fifth-rate frigate
- Tons burthen: 755 90/94 bm
- Length: 121 ft 0 in (36.9 m) (overall); 100 ft 0 3/8 in (30.5 m) (keel)
- Beam: 37 ft 8 in (11.5 m)
- Draught: 14 ft 4 in (4.4 m)
- Depth of hold: 8 ft 8 1/2 in (2.7 m)
- Complement: 280
- Armament: Upper deck: 24 × 24 pdr (11 kg) long guns; Quarterdeck/forecastle: 16 × 32 pdr (15 kg) carronades + 2 × 68 pdr (31 kg) carronades

HMS Princess Charlotte, later HMS Burlington, was a 42-gun fifth-rate frigate of the Royal Navy built in 1814, during the War of 1812 at the Kingston Royal Naval Dockyard in Kingston, Ontario. She had originally been built as Vittoria, but was renamed before being launched. She was constructed to a design by George Record, and was built under a private contract by Master shipwright John Goudie. She served on Lake Ontario, having been commissioned at Oswego on 5 May 1814 under Captain William Mulcaster.

The ship took part in the British attack on Fort Oswego and blockade of Sackett's Harbor on Lake Ontario in 1814. In November that year she came under the command of Captain Edward Collier, and was renamed HMS Burlington on 9 December 1814. Captain Nicholas Lockyer took command in June 1816. Burlington was offered for sale in January 1833, but there were no buyers and she was later towed away and scuttled.

== Description ==
Princess Charlotte was designed by George Record of the Kingston Royal Naval Dockyard in Kingston, Upper Canada. The frigate was constructed under private contract by the master shipwright John Goudie. The vessel measured 755 90/94 tons burthen and was 121 ft 0 in (36.9 m) long overall and 100 ft 0 3/8 in (30.5 m) long at the keel. (Note: Colledge & Warlow have the vessel measuring at 815 tons burthen.) The frigate had a beam of 37 ft 8 in (11.5 m) and a draught of 14 ft 4 in (4.4 m). The frigate's hold had a depth of 8 ft 8 1/2 in (2.7 m). The frigate was pierced for 40 gunports but carried 42 guns. Princess Charlotte was armed with twenty-four 24 pdr (11 kg) long guns on her upper deck and sixteen 32 pdr (15 kg) carronades and two 68 pdr (31 kg) carronades on her quarterdeck and forecastle. The vessel had a complement of 280 officers and enlisted.

== Service history ==
In September 1813, the commander-in-chief of British forces in North America, Sir George Prevost approved further ship construction on Lake Ontario during the War of 1812. Initially the plan was to construct a transport brig, but this idea was later changed to two frigates. The frigate was the first of the two ordered to begin construction. Initially called Vittoria for the recent victory in Spain by British forces, the vessel's name was changed to Princess Charlotte during construction, this time named for one of King George III's daughters. Before the frigate was fully constructed, the commander of British naval forces on Lake Ontario, Commodore Sir James Lucas Yeo, awarded command of the vessel to Commander William Mulcaster, advancing him to the rank of post-captain.

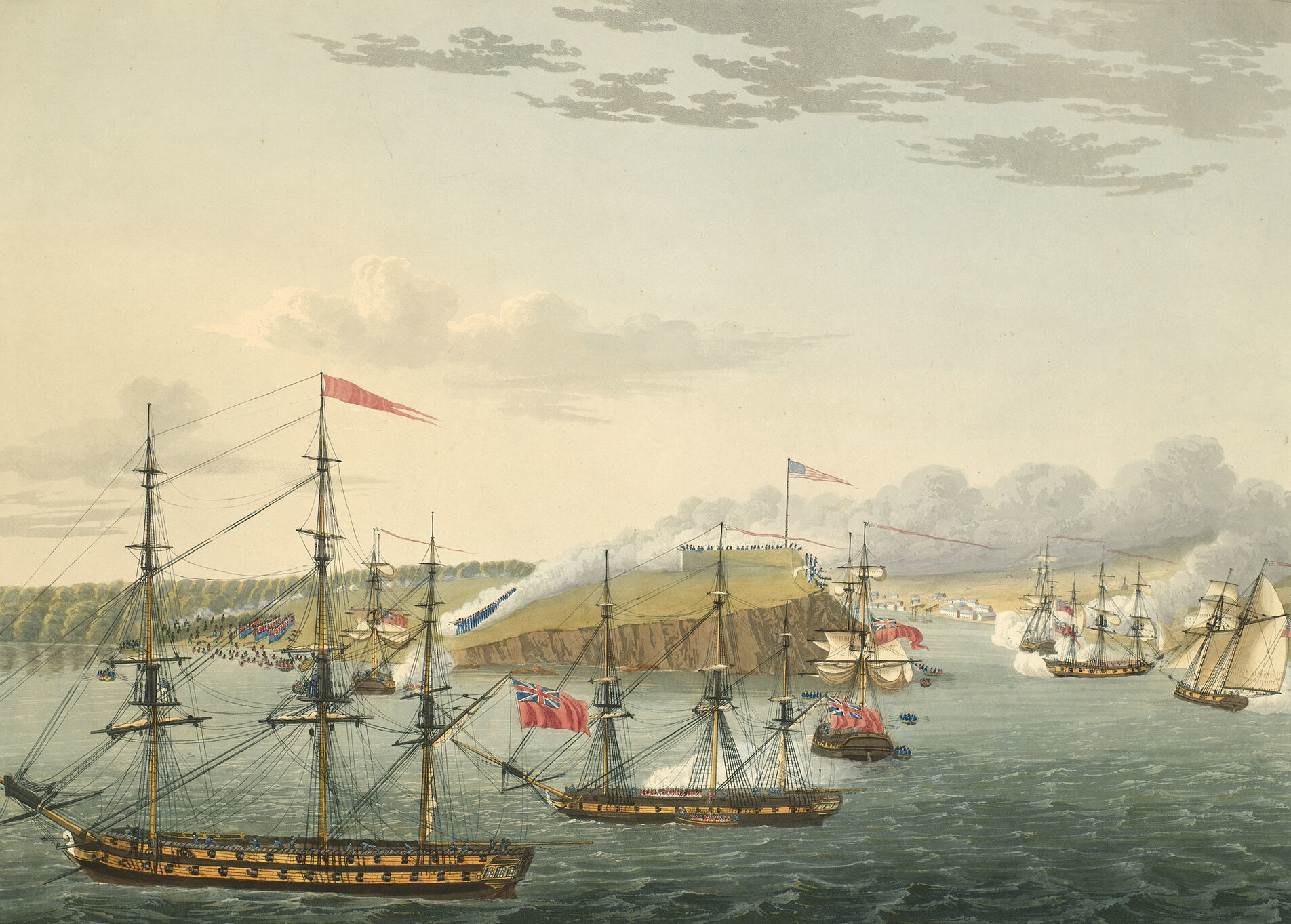
Attack on Fort Oswego. HMS Prince Regent, is the ship on the far left foreground, flying the Red Ensign. Princess Chatlotte astern of her in the centre of the picture.

Princess Charlotte was launched on 14 April 1814, the same day as the second frigate under construction, HMS Prince Regent. The vessel was commissioned under Captain Mulcaster on 5 May 1814 at Oswego. Commodore Yeo's Lake Ontario squadron departed Kingston transporting troops for an attack on Fort Oswego. They arrived on 5 May, where it was decided that Mulcaster would lead a naval detachment of 200 men ashore to assault the fort from its western flank. Princess Charlotte would remain offshore, carrying reserves for the battle. At 06:00 on 6 May, the battle began at 09:00, Mulcaster had moved Princess Charlotte into position where the frigate could bombard the fort with her 24-pounder long guns. The frigate opened fire at 13:00 and under the naval bombardment, the landing began. Mulcaster's men stormed the main shore battery. During the assault, Mulcaster was severely injured when he was shot through the leg. Lieutenant John Scott of Princess Charlotte took over command of the attack on the western flank. Fort Oswego was captured and the reserves aboard Princess Charlotte were landed to secure the perimeter around the fort and town. Supplies and goods were taken and the squadron returned to Kingston on 8 May.

On 11 May, the squadron sailed again along the south shore of Lake Ontario and began a naval blockade of the main United States naval base on the lake at Sackets Harbor, New York. With Mulcaster's severe injuries, command of Princess Charlotte passed to Captain Edward Collier. (Note: Winfield has the vessel only recommissioning in November 1814 under Captain Collier, while Malcomson has Captain Richard O'Connor taking command at the point.) Princess Charlotte was stationed off Stony Island during the blockade. On 29 May, a British force under Captains Stephen Popham and Francis Spilsbury was defeated at Sandy Creek by the American units they were sent to capture. This defeat led Yeo to lift the blockade on 5 June and return to Kingston. For the rest of the summer, Princess Charlotte remained within Kingston's harbour.

On 1 October, command of Princess Charlotte was given to Captain Richard O'Connor with newly arrived Captain Peter Fisher being awarded the command of the much smaller Montreal. This did not sit well with Fisher, as he believed that he should have been given command of Princess Charlotte, being the senior captain. After attempting to address the issue with Yeo, which failed, Fisher sent a complaint to the Admiralty. This complaint was among the reasons that led to Yeo's recall by the Admiralty in November. On 16 October, the new flagship HMS St Lawrence, accompanied by the rest of the squadron, transported infantry reinforcements and supplies to General Gordon Drummond in the Niagara region, arriving on 20 October. With the arrival of St Lawrence on Lake Ontario, the American squadron no longer attempted to wrest control of the lake from the British.

On 9 December 1814, the frigate was renamed Burlington. (Note: Lardas states that the vessel's name change to Burlington took place in September 1814.) Following the war, the vessel remained in commission and came under the command of Captain Nicholas Lockyer in June 1816. Later that year, the frigate was laid up in ordinary. (Note: Lyon & Winfield have Burlington in reserve by May 1816, which conflicts with the commission of Captain Lockyer.) Burlington was put up for sale in January 1833, but finding no buyers, was towed away and scuttled in Deadmans Bay in Lake Ontario. The wrecksite, along with those of St Lawrence and Prince Regent were designated a National Historic Site of Canada in 2015.
