= Burlington (Petersburg, Virginia) =

Historic house in Virginia, United States

- U.S. National Register of Historic Places
- Virginia Landmarks Register
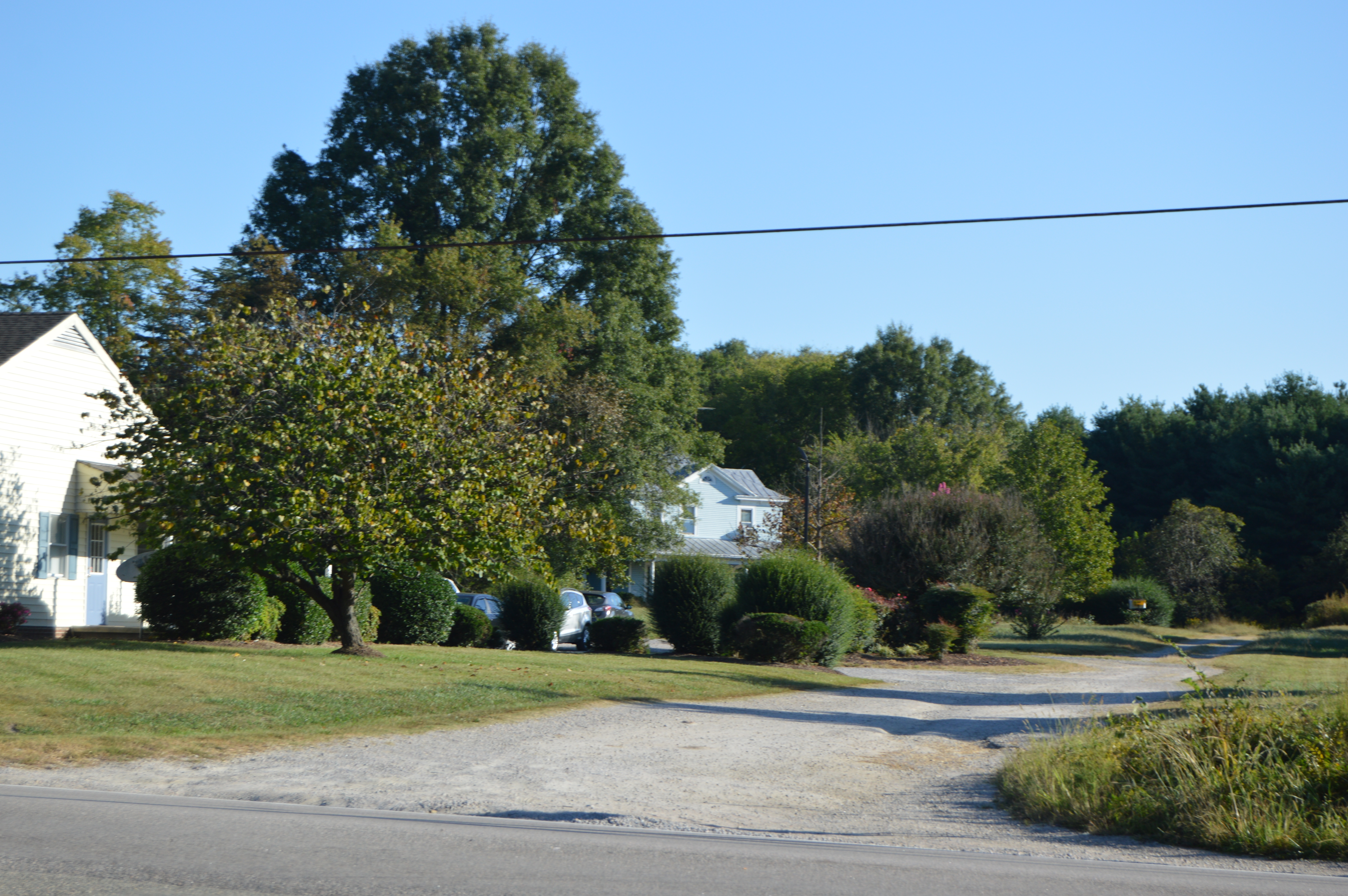
- Entrance to the property

- Location within Virginia Location within the United States
- Location: Off Ferndale Road, west of Petersburg, Virginia
- Coordinates: 37°13′19″N 77°26′52″W
- Area: 34.7 acres (14.0 ha)
- Built: c. 1750
- NRHP reference No.: 76002102
- VLR No.: 026-0001

Significant dates
- Added to NRHP: April 30, 1976
- Designated VLR: October 21, 1975

Burlington is a historic plantation house located near Petersburg, Dinwiddie County, Virginia. It was built about 1750, and is a 1 1/2-story frame dwelling with a center-passage, double-pile plan. It has a slate gable roof with dormers. A one-story wing was added during its restoration in 1954.

It was listed on the National Register of Historic Places in 1976.
