= Fairview (Burlington, West Virginia) =

Historic house in West Virginia, United States

- U.S. National Register of Historic Places
- U.S. Historic district
- Location within Eastern Panhandle of West Virginia Location within West Virginia Location within the United States
- Location: Junction of Patterson Creek Dr. and Russelldale Rds., near Burlington, West Virginia
- Coordinates: 39°20′9″N 78°56′11″W
- Area: 15 acres (6.1 ha)
- Built: 1833
- Architect: John T. Peerce
- Architectural style: Greek Revival, Federal
- NRHP reference No.: 92001631
- Added to NRHP: December 7, 1992

"Fairview", also known as the Peerce Home Place, Peerce House, and Rural Retreat, is a historic home and national historic district located near Burlington, Mineral County, West Virginia. The district includes seven contributing buildings and one contributing site. The main house was most likely built in the 1860s. It is a two-story, square brick dwelling with a rectangular wing in a transitional Federal-Greek Revival style. It has a hipped roof, capped by a cupola and a one-story portico with painted wooden Ionic order columns. Also on the property are a contributing log cabin (c. 1800) and a number of farm-related outbuildings.

It was listed on the National Register of Historic Places in 1992.
