= Burlington Downtown Historic District =

Historic district in Wisconsin, United States

- U.S. National Register of Historic Places
- U.S. Historic district
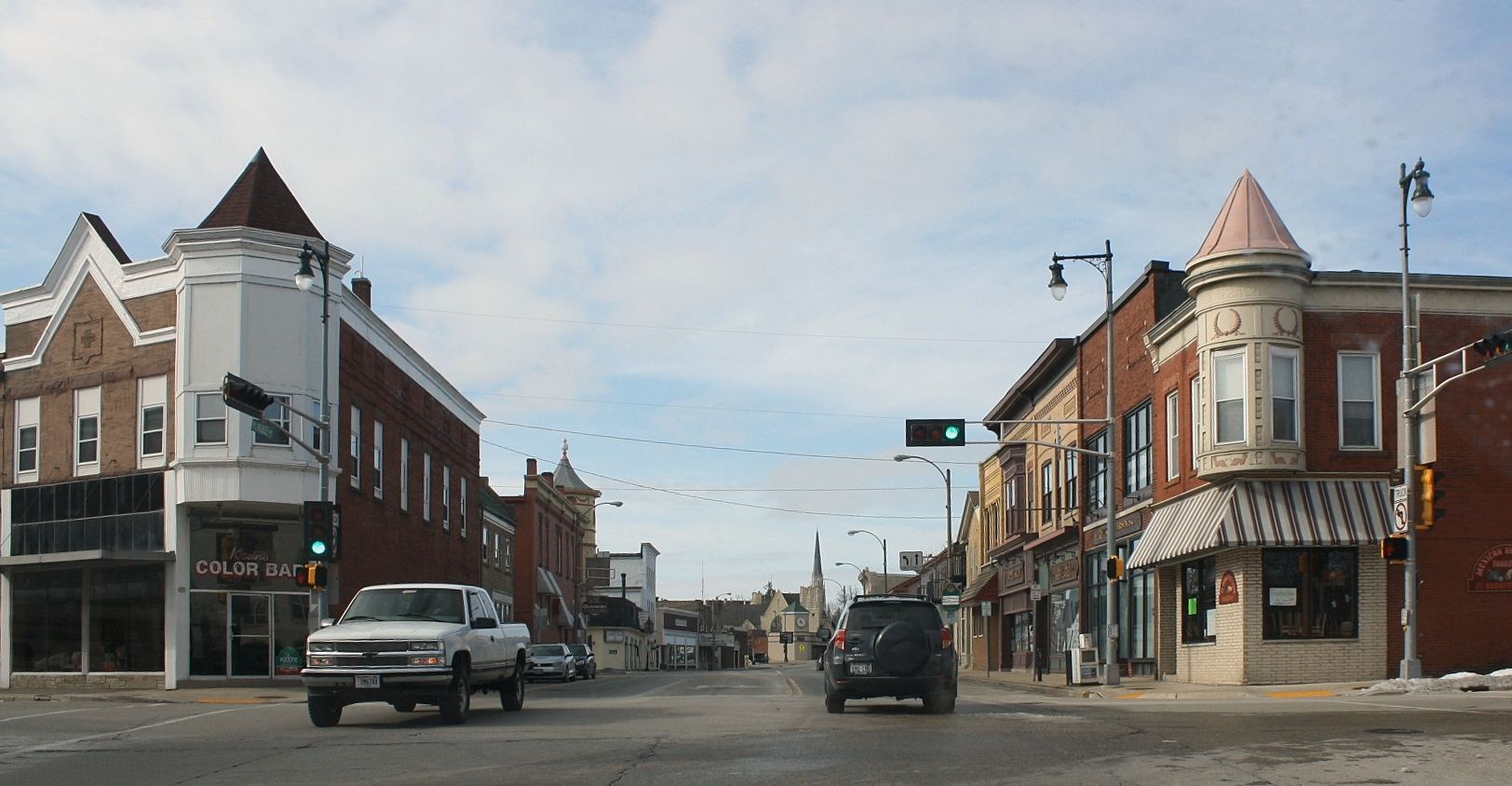
- A portion of the district.

- Location within Wisconsin Location within the United States
- Location: Roughly bounded by E. Jefferson, N. Pine, E. Washington, E. Chestnut, N. Dodge, Commerce, Mill, and W. Chestnut Sts., Burlington, Wisconsin
- Coordinates: 42.68033°N 88.27697°W
- Area: 15 acres (6.1 ha)
- Architectural style: Greek Revival, Italianate
- NRHP reference No.: 00000603
- Added to NRHP: June 2, 2000

The Burlington Downtown Historic District is a 15 acres (6.1 ha) historic district located in Burlington, Wisconsin, United States. It was added to the National Register of Historic Places in 2000.

It includes 80 contributing buildings and 17 non-contributing ones, as well as a non-contributing site. Included are:

- Plaza Theater (1928), at 448 Milwaukee Ave., castle-like Tudor Revival style
- Jones Block 1 (1868), at 113-129 E. Chestnut St.
