= Vandiver-Trout-Clause House =

Historic house in West Virginia, United States

- U.S. National Register of Historic Places
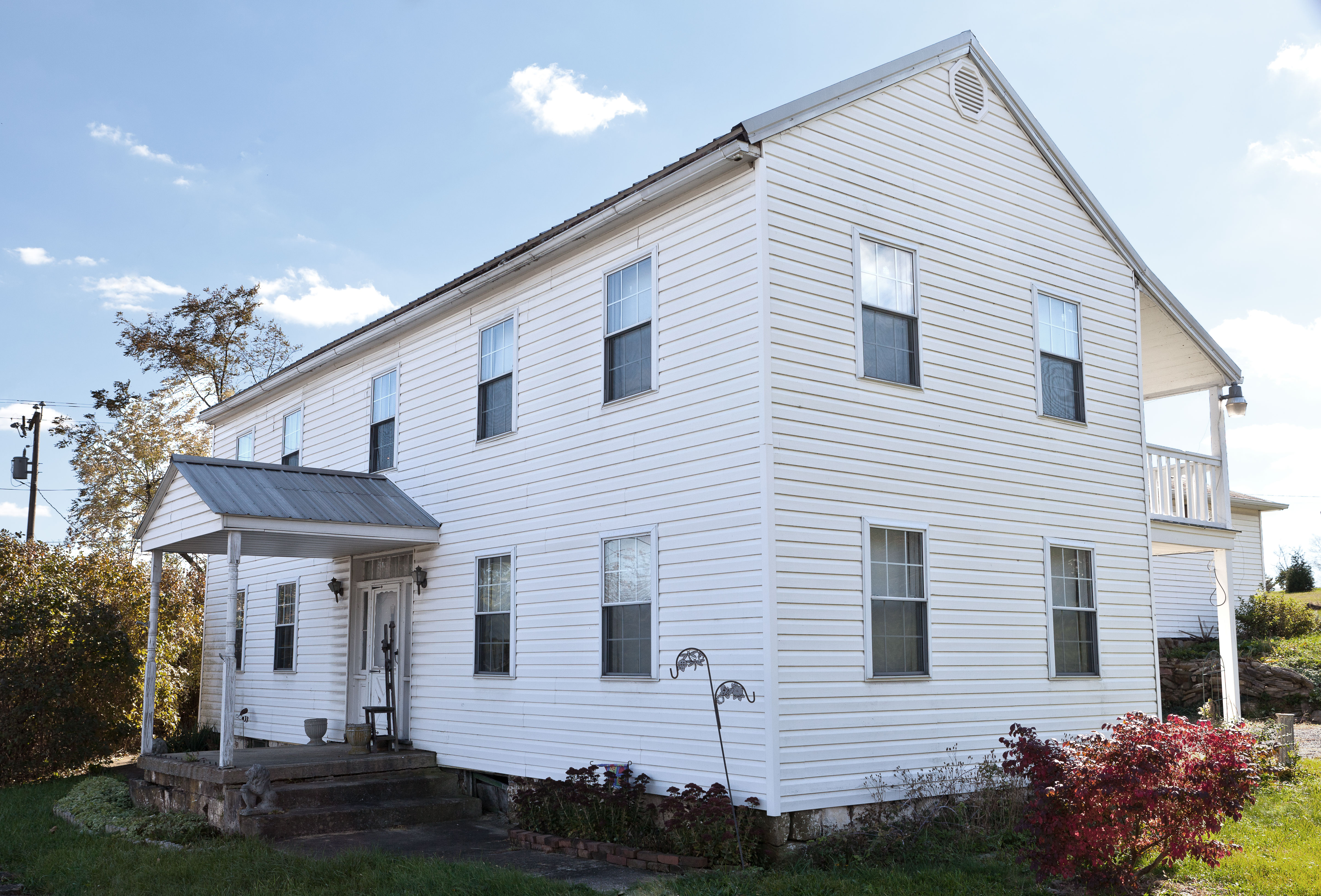
- Vandiver-Trout-Clause House, October 2012

- Location within Eastern Panhandle of West Virginia Location within West Virginia Location within the United States
- Location: U.S. 50 and 220, Ridgeville, West Virginia
- Coordinates: 39°20′58″N 78°59′33″W
- Area: 2 acres (0.81 ha)
- Architectural style: Federal
- NRHP reference No.: 79002592
- Added to NRHP: May 29, 1979

Vandiver-Trout-Clause House is a historic home located at Ridgeville, Mineral County, West Virginia. For many years it provided accommodations for travelers and also served as a post office, tavern, polling place, and landmark. It is an L-shaped, two-story frame building with a gable roof in a vernacular Federal style. It was built sometime in the first quarter of the 19th century.

It was listed on the National Register of Historic Places in 1979.
