= Burlington Historic District (Burlington, West Virginia) =

Historic district in West Virginia, United States

- U.S. National Register of Historic Places
- U.S. Historic district
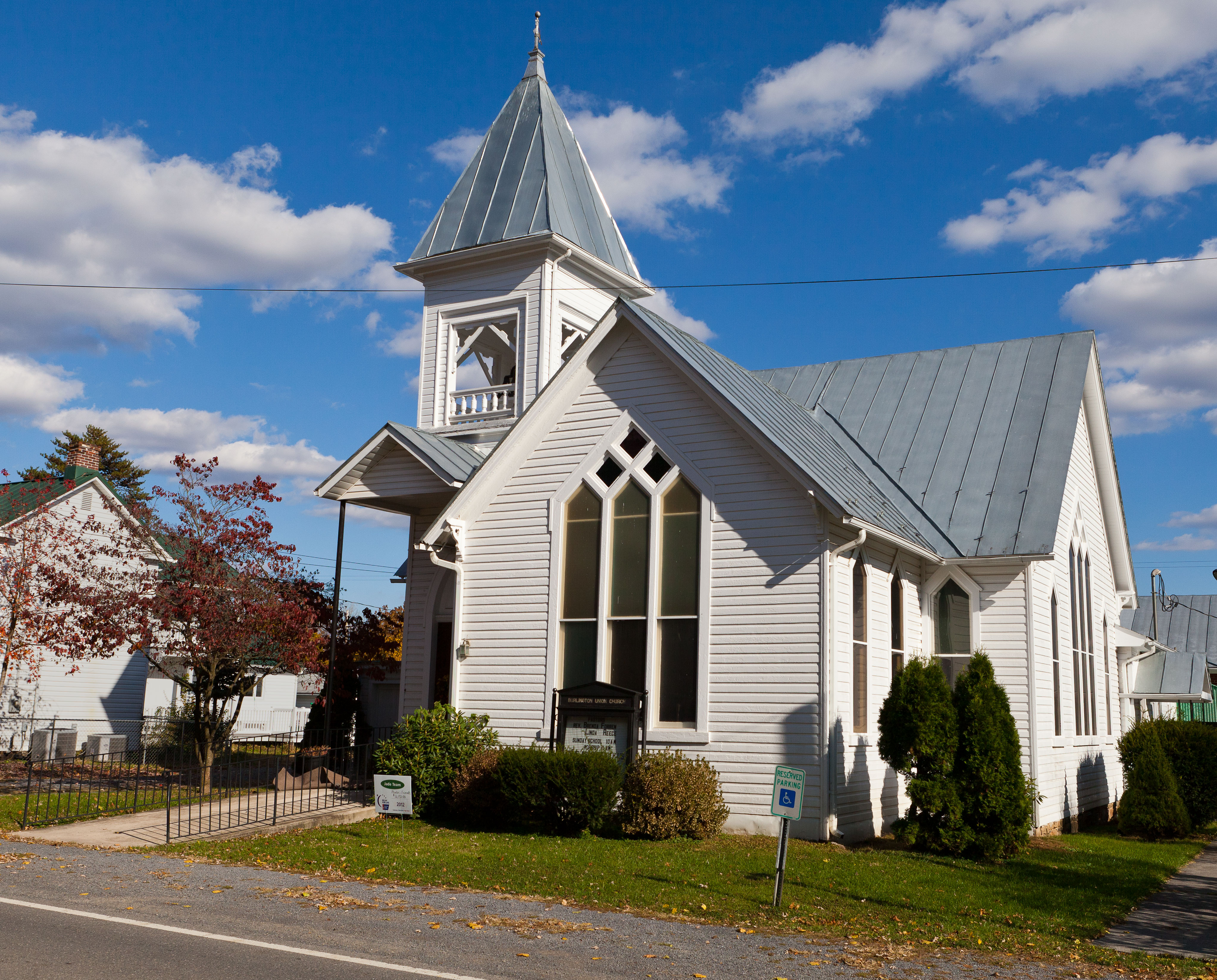

- Location within Eastern Panhandle of West Virginia Location within West Virginia Location within the United States
- Location: WV 11 S from jct. with US 50/220, Burlington, West Virginia
- Coordinates: 39°20′9″N 78°55′9″W
- Area: 42 acres (17 ha)
- Built by: Henry Baker, John T. Peerce, B.D. Price, et al.
- Architectural style: Greek Revival, Queen Anne
- NRHP reference No.: 92001660
- Added to NRHP: December 7, 1992

Burlington Historic District is a national historic district located at Burlington, Mineral County, West Virginia. The district includes 45 contributing buildings and 2 contributing sites in the central business district and surrounding residential areas of Burlington. The district includes notable examples of vernacular interpretations of the Greek Revival and Queen Anne styles.

Notable buildings include The Homestead (c. 1784), Old Fire House (c. 1930), TM&P Railroad Station (c. 1920), Peter Arnold House (c. 1900), Thrush House (c. 1890), Burlington Union Church (c. 1892), Old Presbyterian Manse (c. 1870), Weaver's Antique Service Station, and Cemetery Hill.

It was listed on the National Register of Historic Places in 1992.

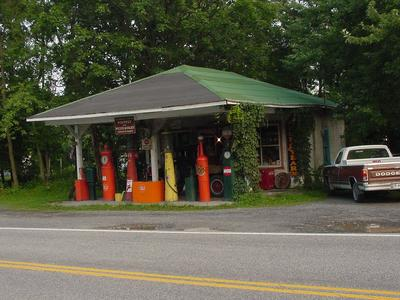
Weaver's Antique Service Station (c. 1930)
