= Burlington, West Virginia =

Burlington
- Census-designated place (CDP)
- Location within the state of West Virginia
- Coordinates: 39°20′13″N 78°55′20″W
- Country: United States
- State: West Virginia
- County: Mineral

Area
  - Total: 1.226 sq mi (3.18 km^{2})
  - Land: 1.226 sq mi (3.18 km^{2})
  - Water: 0 sq mi (0 km^{2})
- Elevation: 751 ft (229 m)

Population (2020)
  - Total: 131
  - Density: 107/sq mi (41.3/km^{2})
- Time zone: UTC-5 (Eastern (EST))
  - Summer (DST): UTC-4 (EDT)
- ZIP codes: 26710
- GNIS feature ID: 2586776

Burlington is a census-designated place (CDP) in Mineral County, West Virginia, United States, along U.S. Route 50 (also known as the Northwestern Turnpike) crossing Pattersons Creek. As of the 2020 census, its population was 131. It is part of the Cumberland, MD-WV Metropolitan Statistical Area.

== Festivals ==
Burlington is the home of the Old Fashioned Apple Harvest Festival (started in 1973), which has grown into the biggest celebration of its kind in the Eastern Panhandle of West Virginia. It is held annually on the first weekend of October.

== History ==
Burlington is situated along the old Northwestern Turnpike (US 50) in southeastern Mineral County, West Virginia. German and English settlers began to populate the area of Burlington in the second quarter of the 18th century following the surveying of Patterson Creek Manor by Thomas, Lord Fairfax in 1738.

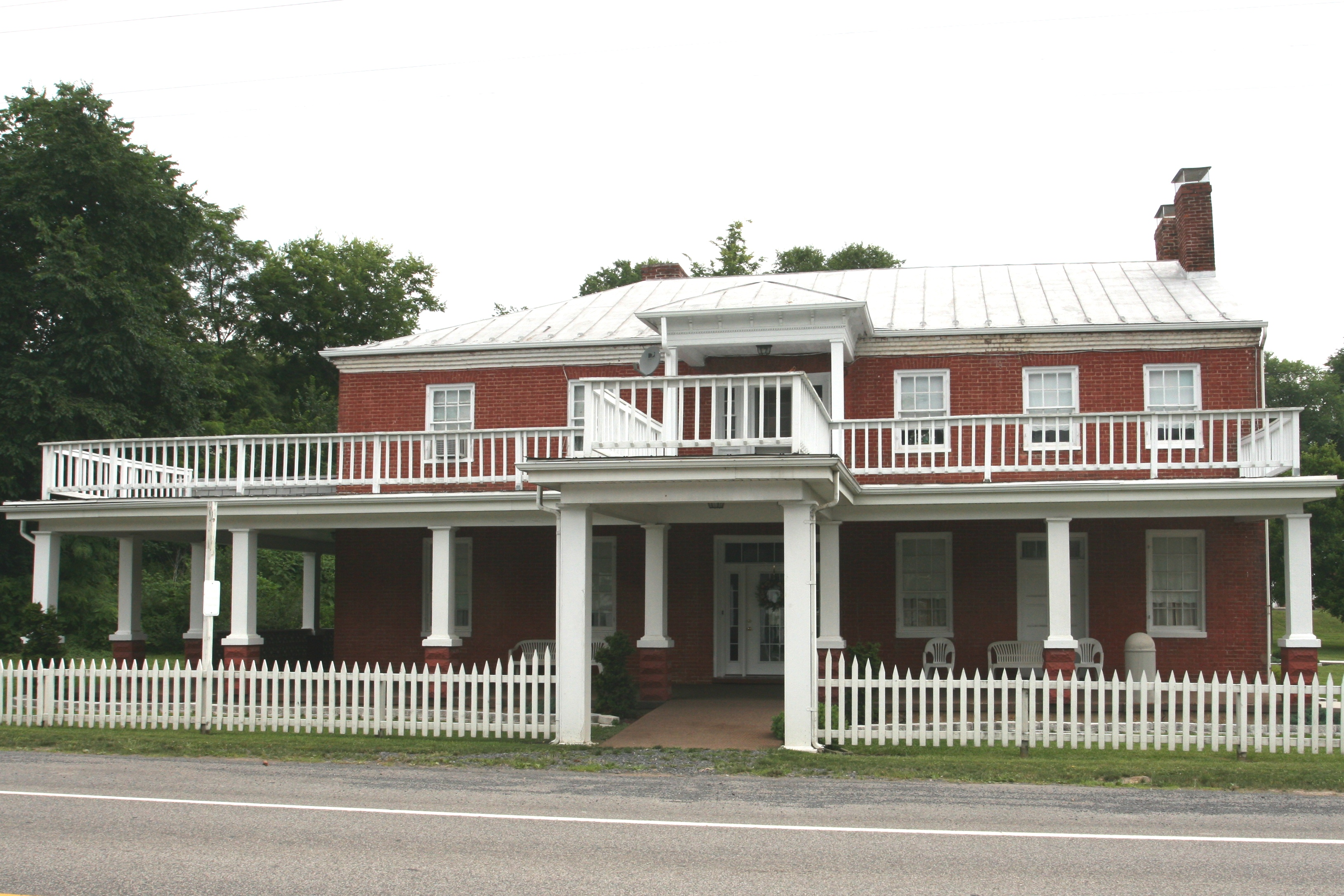
The Homestead, built c. 1831

The village took shape around the turn of the 19th century as several mills constructed along Mill Creek and Patterson Creek brought commerce to the region. The Burlington Post Office was established on September 24, 1827. (It was closed from 1844-1853 and from 1860-1867). The construction of the Northwestern Turnpike through Burlington in 1831 helped to further its development into a regional center for commerce. Many of the houses admired for their architecture in the village today were constructed in the first half of the 19th century during this time of economic prosperity. One of the oldest houses in Burlington, the Homestead, was built as a tavern to service the stage coach traffic which came through the village along the turnpike. Constructed by John and Ruth Ann Vandiver, the Homestead continued to serve as an inn and restaurant well into the mid-twentieth century.

During the American Civil War, at least six skirmishes were fought in or near Burlington between Union and Confederate forces in 1861 and 1863. The first three actions took place on September 2, 1861, and April 6 and 26, 1863 between the Ringgold Cavalry of Pennsylvania and confederate forces. On August 4, 1863, the union Washington County Cavalry company fought near the town, and the federal LaFayette County Cavalry company was engaged near it on October 13, 1863. On November 16, 1863, a company of the 2nd Maryland Infantry, Potomac Home Brigade and two Union companies of the 14th West Virginia Infantry were engaged with Confederate forces in a skirmish about three miles south of the town. Three union soldiers, First Lieutenant George W. Hardman, Sergeant Samuel H. Morris and Private William Gardner were killed.

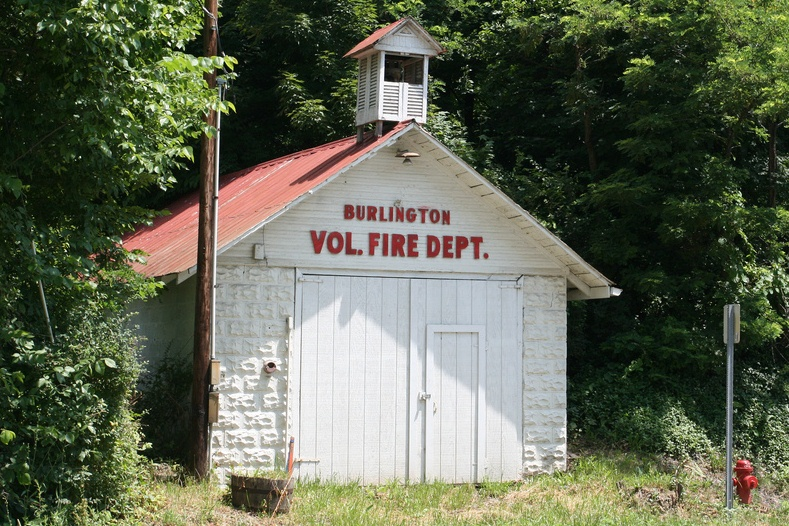
Old Engine House of the Burlington Vol. Fire Company, built c. 1935

In 1913, Dr. F.L. Baker of Burlington and Rev. F.C. Rollman, Postmaster of nearby Elk Garden organized the Star of Hope Child Refuge, a home and school for orphaned children who otherwise would have been sent to the county poor farm or orphanage. From 1950 through 1993, the center was known as the Burlington United Methodist Children's Home and today is known as the Burlington United Methodist Family Services, Inc. The center's campus includes residential and classroom buildings in Burlington. The Burlington United Methodist Family Services also operates facilities in Keyser and Beckley.

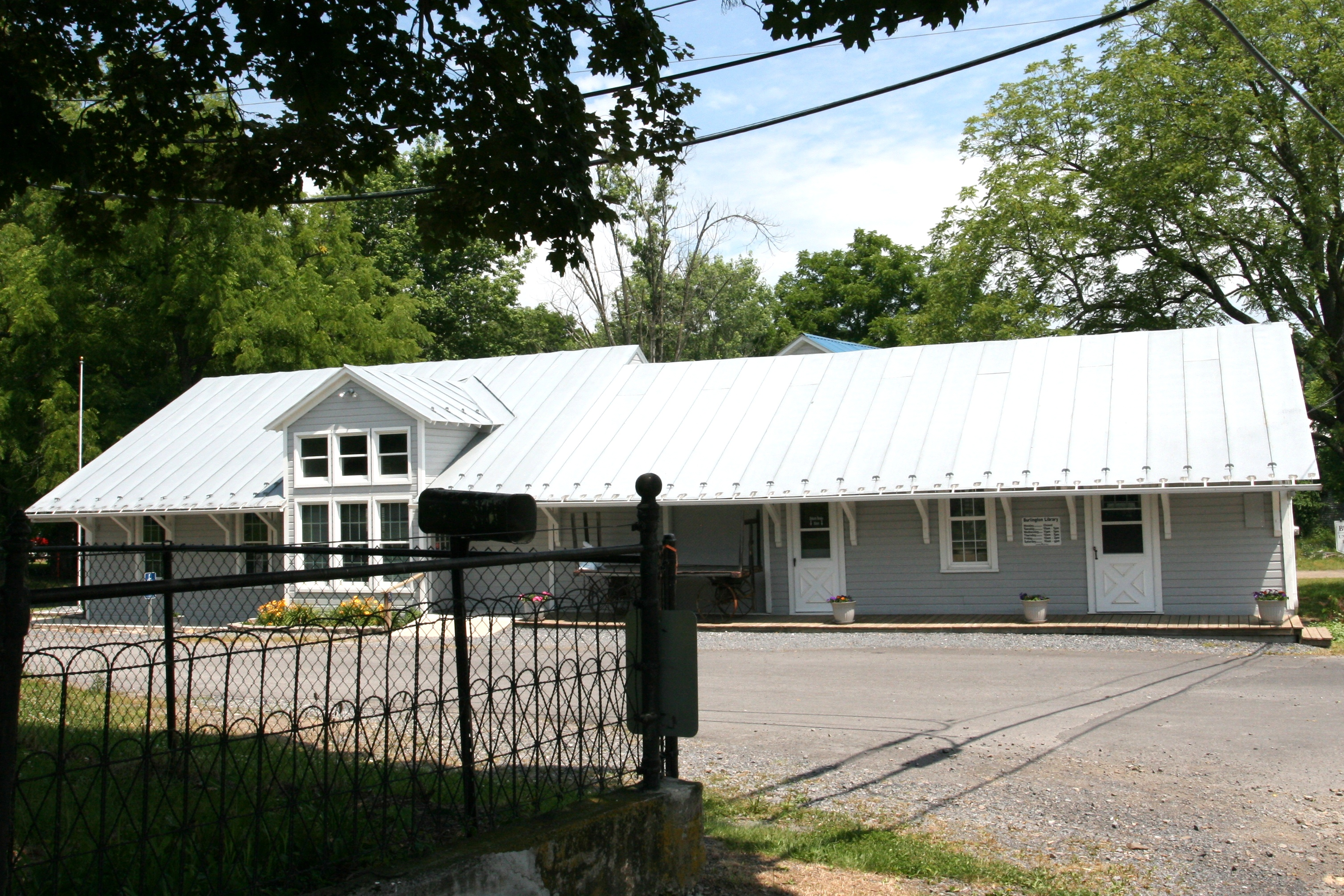
Former Twin Mountain and Potomac Railroad Station, built in 1911

Burlington remains a rural farming community. The Burlington Historic District was added to the National Register of Historic Places in 1992, and includes approximately 25 homes and businesses.

=== Historic sites ===
- The Homestead (c. 1831) A Federal styled brick house constructed by John and Ruth Ann Vandiver as a tavern along the Northwestern Turnpike. Originally built as a side-hall house, later additions expanded it into a center hall plan
- The Vandiver House (1881) A brick and frame house designed in Queen Anne style by B.B. Price of Philadelphia, constructed by Captain John and Jane Vandiver.

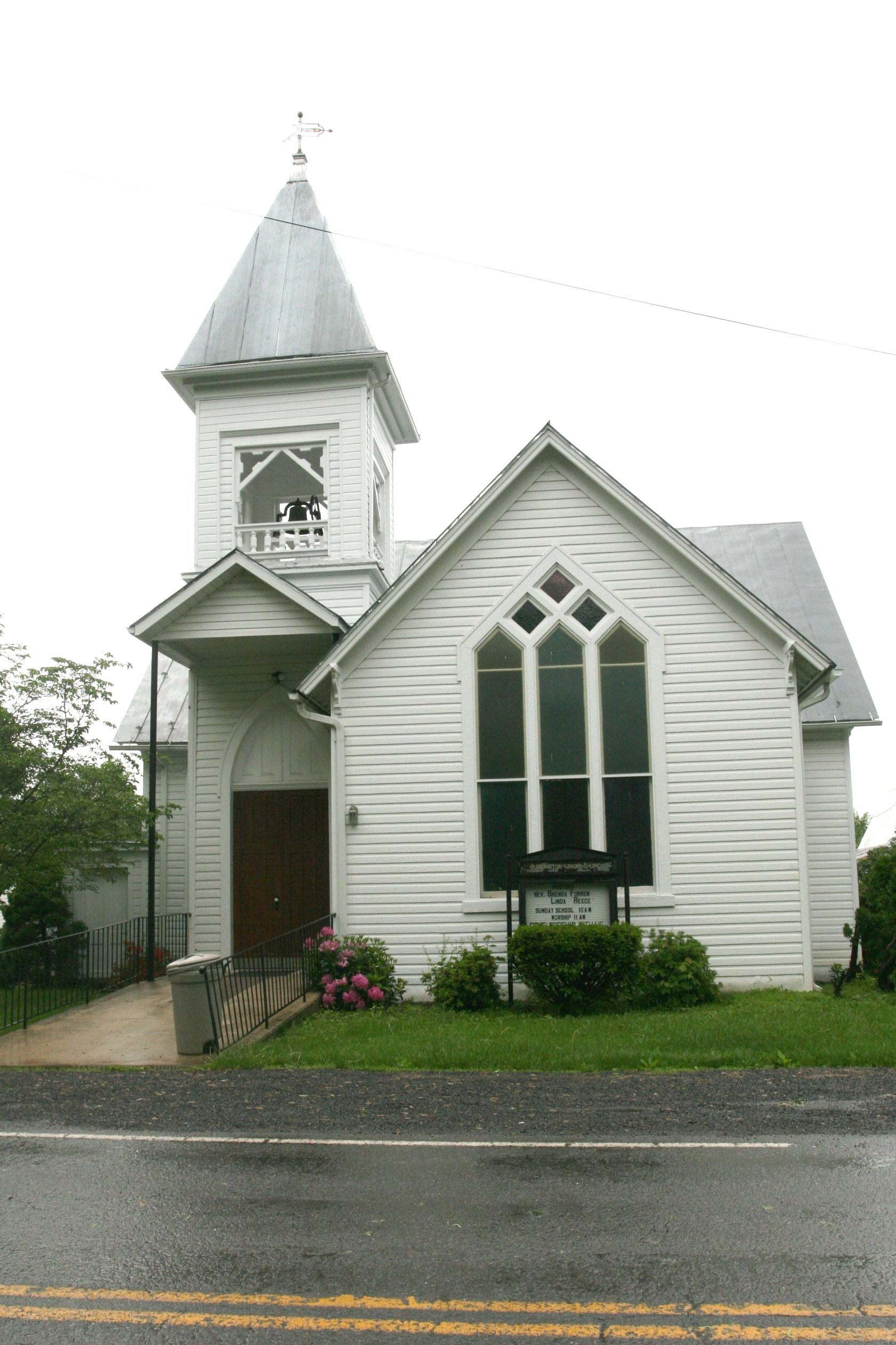
Burlington Union Church, built c. 1892

- Union Church (c. 1892) The original church in Burlington was a log structure erected near the village cemetery between 1808 and 1818 and used by the Patterson Creek Baptist Church. This building was replaced with the "Free Church" in 1854 which was used by several congregations, including the Methodist Episcopal Church and the Presbyterian Church. These two congregations erected a new church in 1892 on Burlington's Main Street which is called the Union Church. It is of frame construction and is built in Gothic Revival style.
- Twin Mountain and Potomac Railroad Station (1911) The freight station of Twin Mountain and Potomac Railroad, which was built in 1911 to haul fruit from the orchards on the mountains around Burlington to Keyser, has also served as the post office and currently houses a branch of the Keyser-Mineral County Library. The station building is the only remaining structure associated with the short-lived Twin Mountain and Potomac Railroad.

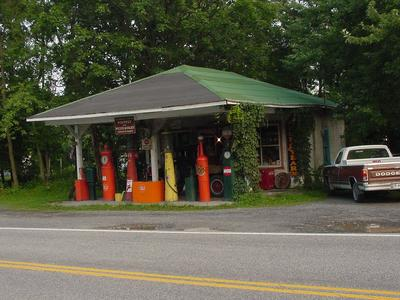
Weaver's Antique Service Station (c. 1930)

- Weaver's Service Station (Early 20th century) At Weaver's Antique Service Station, one can step back in time to the days of gas pumps and classic cars. Operated until 1985 as a service station, the landmark has become a living museum complete with pedal cars and other service station memorabilia.

Located near Burlington are Carskadon House, Fairview, Fort Hill, and Travelers Rest, all listed on the National Register of Historic Places.
