= Burlington Township =

Burlington Township may refer to:

- Burlington Township, Kane County, Illinois
- Burlington Township, Carroll County, Indiana
- Burlington Township, Calhoun County, Michigan
- Burlington Township, Lapeer County, Michigan
- Burlington Township, Minnesota
- Burlington Township, New Jersey
- Burlington Township, Ward County, North Dakota, in Ward County, North Dakota
- Burlington Township, Ohio
- Burlington Township, Bradford County, Pennsylvania

== See also ==
- Burlington Township High School, in New Jersey
