= Daniel J. Caron =

Canadian librarian and archivist (born 1957)

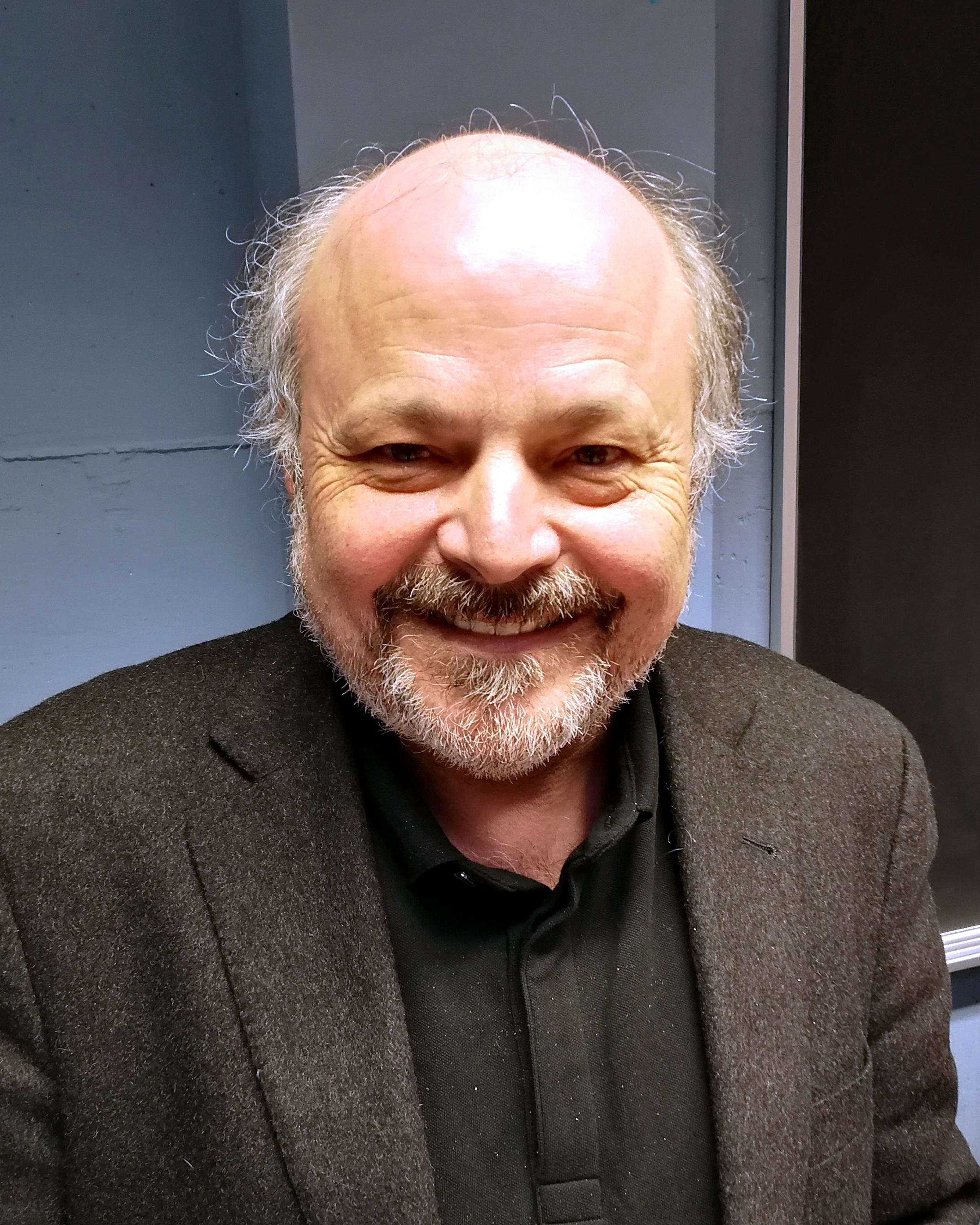

2nd Librarian and Archivist of Canada
- In office April 25, 2009 – May 15, 2013 during pleasure
- Governor General: David Johnston
- Prime Minister: Stephen Harper
- Preceded by: Ian E. Wilson

Personal details
- Born: 1957 (age 68–69) Sainte-Foy, Quebec, Canada

Daniel J. Caron (born 1957) was the Librarian and Archivist of Canada from April 25, 2009, until retiring on May 15, 2013. He is also a professor, author, fellow and public speaker.

== Education ==
Caron graduated with a Bachelor's and a Master's degree in Economics from Laval University, and earned a doctorate in Applied Human Sciences from the University of Montreal. His doctoral dissertation was in Canadian studies on aboriginal issues.

== Career ==
Caron began his public service in 1982 at the Competition Bureau and also worked for the National Museums of Canada Corporation and the Department of Indian Affairs and Northern Development. Later, in the 1990s, he worked at the Economic Development Agency of Canada for Quebec. From Montreal he moved to the Treasury Board Secretariat where he was Director of the Service and Innovation Division. He moved to Human Resources Development Canada in 2000. In 2003 he joined the National Archives of Canada, now Library and Archives Canada (LAC), as the Director General of the Corporate Management Branch and subsequently held various positions at the institution.

Caron was appointed Librarian and Archivist of Canada on April 24, 2009. Between 2011 and 2013, at the request of the Clerk of the Privy Council, he was Chair of the Heads of Federal Agencies. Between 2010 and 2013, he was Chair of the Forum of National Archivists within the International Council of Archives. He was also a founding member of the Forum. He retired from the Canadian Public Service on May 15, 2013, after 31 years of service.

Caron has also taught at Concordia University, University of Ottawa, Carleton University and École nationale d'administration publique (ENAP). He has conducted research, published many articles, and given several conference presentations on public administration, archival sciences, and information management.

== Publications ==
- Web HT.0. Pour use société informée: la pertinence numérique et ses défis pour les sociétés démocratiques XXI ième siècle. Paris: Hermann. 2011.
- L'homme imbibé: de l'oral au numérique : un enjeu pour l'avenir des cultures? Paris: Hermann. 2014.
