= Whakamarama =

Whakamārama
- Rural community
- Interactive map of Whakamārama
- Coordinates: 37.717°S 175.995°E
- Country: New Zealand
- Region: Bay of Plenty
- Territorial authority: Western Bay of Plenty District
- Ward: Kaimai Ward
- Electorates: Coromandel; Waiariki (Māori)

Government
  - Territorial Authority: Western Bay of Plenty District Council
  - Regional council: Bay of Plenty Regional Council
  - Mayor of Western Bay of Plenty: James Denyer
  - Coromandel MP: Scott Simpson
  - Waiariki MP: Rawiri Waititi

Area
  - Total: 29.27 km^{2} (11.30 sq mi)

Population (2023)
  - Total: 573
  - Density: 19.6/km^{2} (50.7/sq mi)
- Postcode(s): 3179

Whakamārama (/ˌfɑːkəˈmɑːrəmə/) is a rural area in the Western Bay of Plenty District and Bay of Plenty Region of New Zealand's North Island.

It includes a section of State Highway 2 between Ōmokoroa and Te Puna that underwent major maintenance work in early 2020.

The area is dominated by orchards and avocado growers, and has been targeted by avocado thieves.

== Etymology ==
Whakamārama is the Māori word for illumination or explanation.

The macron was officially added to the name in 2019.

== History and culture ==
=== Māori settlement ===
Whakamārama was one of the Māori villages attacked during the New Zealand Wars in 1867.

The event is marked with a commemorative pouwhenua at Tawhitinui Marae, unveiled on the 150th anniversary in April 2017.

=== Recent history ===
The Atrium Art Gallery opened in Whakamārama in May 2019. It featured a steampunk exhibition later that year.

A missing 85-year-old man was found dead in Whakamārama in July 2019.

In September 2019, police began pursuing a driver in Whakamārama, following through Te Puna before eventually stopping them with road spikes in Bethlehem.

A search operation was launched in Whakamārama in January 2020, after a Tauranga man went missing. The case was featured on Police reality TV series Police Ten 7 four months later, in May 2020.

Several fires broke out in early 2020 in a bark processing plant, a bark pile, a garage and rental home, and a large area of scrub.

=== Coronavirus pandemic ===
During the 2020 coronavirus lockdown, nine-year-old Whakamārama girl Lucinda Finnimore wrote a letter to Prime Minister Jacinda Ardern, asking if the Easter Bunny and Tooth Fairy were deemed essential workers during lockdown.

Ardern responded that they were essential workers, resulting in international media coverage from the Washington Post, the New York Times, CNN, BBC News,. and others.

Salon published an opinion piece, criticising American media for reporting Finnimore's question and Ardern's response, while failing to cover the pandemic in Asia, and what the United States could learn from what was happening in Asia.

=== Marae ===
Tawhitinui Marae is located in the Ōmokoroa area. It is a tribal meeting ground of the Ngāti Ranginui hapū of Pirirākau, and includes the Kahi meeting house.

In October 2020, the Government committed $68,682 from the Provincial Growth Fund to upgrade the marae, creating an estimated 13 jobs.

== Notable people ==
Te Paea Paringatai, a descendant of Waikato, Ngāti Ranginui, and Ngāti Porou, was elected to be the first International Federation of Library Associations and Institutions (IFLA) President-elect from New Zealand.

== Demographics ==
Whakamārama covers 29.27 km^{2} (11.30 sq mi). It is part of the larger Pahoia statistical area.

Historical population
Year	Pop.	±% p.a.
2006	471	—
2013	396	−2.45%
2018	516	+5.44%
2023	573	+2.12%
The 2006 population is for a larger area of 30.41 km^{2}. Source:

Whakamārama had a population of 573 in the 2023 New Zealand census, an increase of 57 people (11.0%) since the 2018 census, and an increase of 177 people (44.7%) since the 2013 census. There were 294 males, 282 females, and 3 people of other genders in 183 dwellings. 1.0% of people identified as LGBTIQ+. There were 126 people (22.0%) aged under 15 years, 84 (14.7%) aged 15 to 29, 282 (49.2%) aged 30 to 64, and 90 (15.7%) aged 65 or older.

People could identify as more than one ethnicity. The results were 92.1% European (Pākehā); 14.1% Māori; 0.5% Pasifika; 1.0% Asian; 0.5% Middle Eastern, Latin American and African New Zealanders (MELAA); and 6.3% other, which includes people giving their ethnicity as "New Zealander". English was spoken by 97.9%, Māori by 3.7%, and other languages by 7.3%. No language could be spoken by 3.1% (e.g. too young to talk). New Zealand Sign Language was known by 0.5%. The percentage of people born overseas was 15.7, compared with 28.8% nationally.

Religious affiliations were 34.0% Christian, 0.5% Māori religious beliefs, 0.5% New Age, and 1.6% other religions. People who answered that they had no religion were 55.0%, and 10.5% of people did not answer the census question.

Of those at least 15 years old, 111 (24.8%) people had a bachelor's or higher degree, 258 (57.7%) had a post-high school certificate or diploma, and 90 (20.1%) people exclusively held high school qualifications. 60 people (13.4%) earned over $100,000 compared to 12.1% nationally. The employment status of those at least 15 was 213 (47.7%) full-time, 78 (17.4%) part-time, and 9 (2.0%) unemployed.

== Education ==
Whakamārama School is a co-educational state primary school for Year 1 to 8 students, with a roll of 85 as of July 2026. It opened in 1914.

== Climate ==
Climate data for Whakamārama, elevation 392 m (1,286 ft), (1991–2020)
Month	Jan	Feb	Mar	Apr	May	Jun	Jul	Aug	Sep	Oct	Nov	Dec	Year
Mean daily maximum °C (°F)	21.5 (70.7)	21.7 (71.1)	20.1 (68.2)	17.3 (63.1)	14.5 (58.1)	12.1 (53.8)	11.5 (52.7)	12.1 (53.8)	13.8 (56.8)	15.4 (59.7)	17.4 (63.3)	19.6 (67.3)	16.4 (61.6)
Daily mean °C (°F)	17.3 (63.1)	17.7 (63.9)	16.2 (61.2)	14.0 (57.2)	11.6 (52.9)	9.4 (48.9)	8.7 (47.7)	9.1 (48.4)	10.5 (50.9)	11.8 (53.2)	13.5 (56.3)	15.8 (60.4)	13.0 (55.3)
Mean daily minimum °C (°F)	13.1 (55.6)	13.7 (56.7)	12.3 (54.1)	10.6 (51.1)	8.8 (47.8)	6.8 (44.2)	5.9 (42.6)	6.2 (43.2)	7.3 (45.1)	8.2 (46.8)	9.6 (49.3)	11.9 (53.4)	9.5 (49.2)
Average rainfall mm (inches)	155.4 (6.12)	209.0 (8.23)	177.6 (6.99)	256.5 (10.10)	218.0 (8.58)	233.5 (9.19)	301.2 (11.86)	242.1 (9.53)	200.1 (7.88)	223.8 (8.81)	189.1 (7.44)	215.5 (8.48)	2,621.8 (103.21)
Mean monthly sunshine hours	215.8	188.0	182.5	159.2	134.8	114.2	116.5	139.1	136.9	176.8	181.3	185.7	1,930.8
Source: NIWA

== Puketoki Scenic Reserve ==
Puketoki Scenic Reserve is a 34 ha (84 acres) reserve on Leyland Road, just south of Whakamārama, donated by the Timber Co in 1926, when it had puriri, tawa, hīnau, mangeao, pukatea, miro, rimu, tawhara and ferns. In 1934 it was decided that the company no longer had any rights to its former tramways.

== See also ==
Leyland O’Brien tramline
