= Te Paea Paringatai =

New Zealand librarian

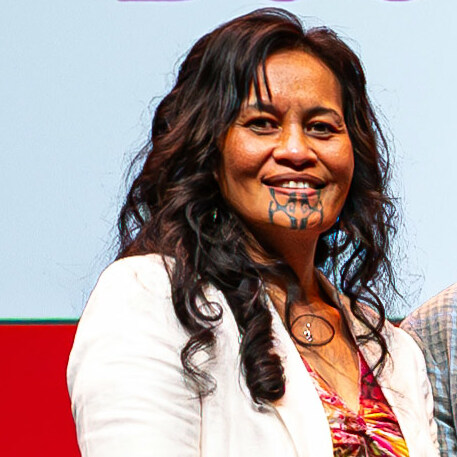
- Te Paea Paringatai in 2023
- Occupation: Librarian
- Known for: First International Federation of Library Associations and Institutions (IFLA) President from New Zealand
- Predecessor: Leslie Weir

Te Paea Paringatai is a Māori Library and Information Leader. She has been a Commissioner on the Library and Information Advisory Commission. In 2025 she became the first International Federation of Library Associations and Institutions (IFLA) President-elect from Aotearoa New Zealand.

== Life ==
Paringatai was brought up by her grandparents in the rural area of Whakamarama in the North Island. She is a descendant of Waikato, Ngāti Ranginui, and Ngāti Porou.

She received the Te Rōpū Whakahau Meri Mygind Wahine Toa Award in 2016. She has also received a LIANZA Associateship and LIANZA Fellowship Award.

New Zealand's Internal Affairs minister, Tracey Martin, appointed her as a Commissioner in November 2018 of the Library and Information Advisory Commission. Her role on the commission is to advise the minister. This should take into account the knowledge and the culture of the Maori people which is known as Mātauranga Māori.

In 2020 she was at the Puaka-James Hight Library at the University of Canterbury where she was the Manager Engagement and Learning Support. In 2021 her work was rewarded when she became an Honorary Member of Te Rōpū Whakahau, the national body that represents "Māori engaged in libraries, culture, knowledge, information, communication and systems technology".

She was the popular choice to be the next International Federation of Library Associations and Institutions (IFLA) President when she was chosen in 2025. She will succeed Leslie Weir in 2027. She will be the first from Aotearoa New Zealand and she should bring a Te Ao Māori viewpoint which she learned about as a child. This Maori worldview acknowledges the connections between everything in the world whether living or inanimate.

At the time of her election she was studying for a doctorate at the University of Otago.
