= Library and Archives Canada =

Federal institution in Ottawa, Ontario

Coordinates: 45°25′11″N 75°42′28.5″W

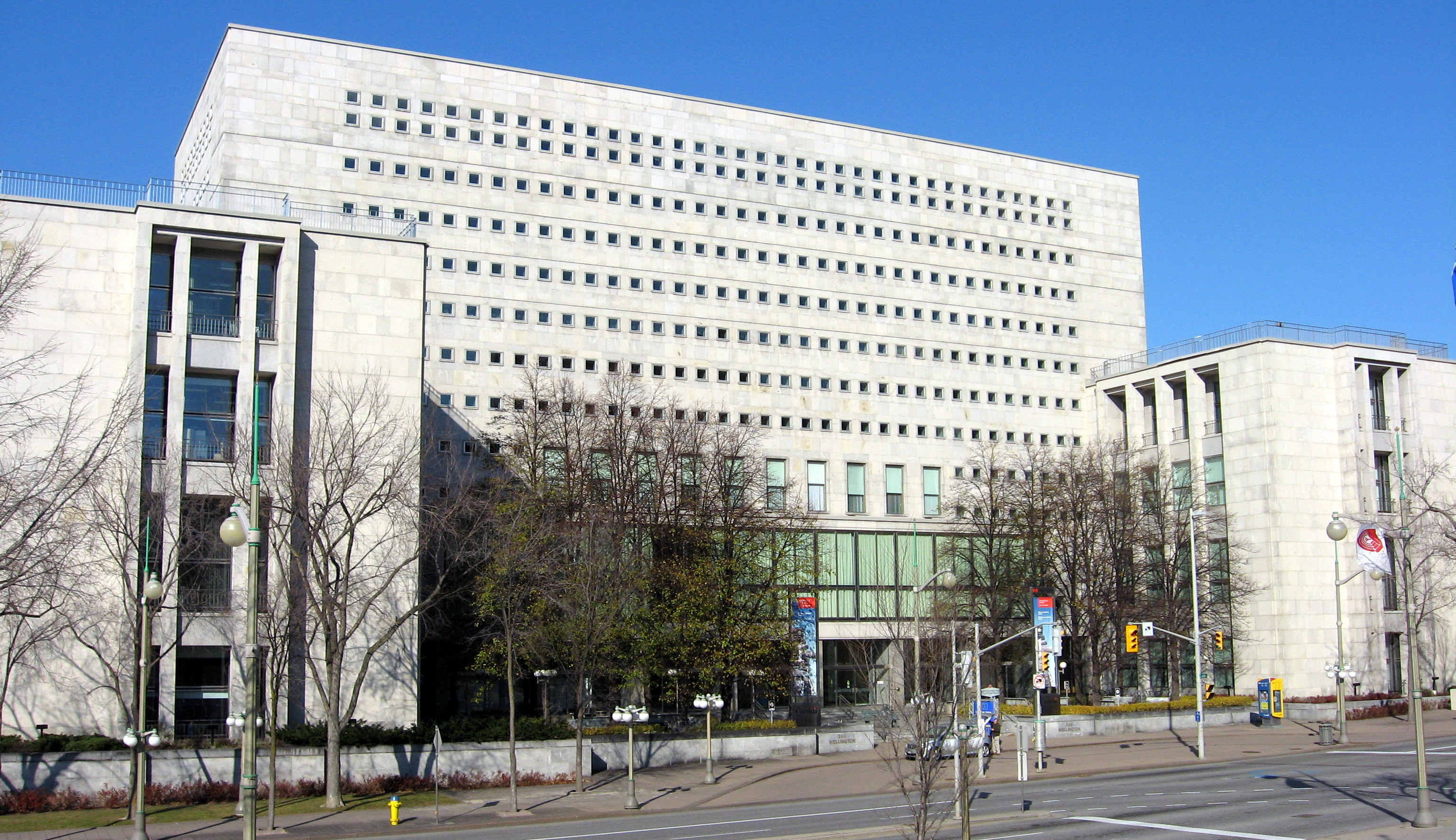
- Library and Archives Canada building in Ottawa
- Location: 395 Wellington Street, Ottawa, Ontario, Canada (Note: The main building is situated on Wellington Street. The institution operates several other facilities throughout the National Capital Region.)
- Type: National library and national archives
- Established: May 21, 2004; 22 years ago (Note: Library and Archives Canada was formed in May 2004, as a result of a merger between National Archives of Canada and the National Library of Canada. The former National Archives traces its origins to the Dominion Archives established in 1872, while the former National Library was established in 1953.)

Collection
- Items collected: Aboriginal magazines; albums and scrapbooks; architectural drawings; art; artifacts; Canadian children's literature; Canadian comic books; Canadian newspapers; Canadian periodicals; electronic publications; electronic records; English-language pulp literature; ethnic community newsletters; ephemera; fiction and non-fiction; films; globes; government publications; government records; government websites; Hebraica and Judaica; Indian residential school records; journals and diaries; livres d’artistes; manuscripts; maps; microfilms; photographs; poetry; portraits; rare books; sheet music; sketchbooks; sound recordings; stamps; textual archives; theses and dissertations; trade catalogues; videos
- Size: 22 million books and publications (periodicals, newspapers, microfilms, literary texts, and government publications); 250 km of government and private textual records; 3 million architectural drawings, maps, and plans; 30 million photos; 350,000 hours of film; 425,000 works of art (including paintings, drawings, watercolours, posters, prints, medals, and caricatures); 547,000 musical items; over 1 billion MB of digital content
- Criteria for collection: Canadiana, documents published in Canada and materials published elsewhere of interest to Canada; records documenting the functions and activities of the Government of Canada; records of heritage value that document the historical development and diversity of Canadian society
- Legal deposit: Yes

Other information
- Budget: CDN$98,346,695 (2013–14)
- Director: Leslie Weir
- Employees: 853 FTE (2021–22)
- Website: canada.ca/en/library-archives.html
- Library and Archives Canada

Agency overview
- Minister responsible: Marc Miller, Minister of Canadian Identity and Culture
- Parent agency: Canadian Heritage
- Key document: Library and Archives of Canada Act

Library and Archives Canada (LAC; French: Bibliothèque et Archives Canada) is the federal institution tasked with acquiring, preserving, and providing accessibility to the documentary heritage of Canada. The national archive and library is the 16th largest library in the world. The LAC reports to the Parliament of Canada through the Minister of Canadian Identity and Culture.

LAC traces its origins to the Dominion Archives, formed in 1872, and the National Library of Canada, formed in 1953. The former was later renamed as the Public Archives of Canada in 1912, and the National Archives of Canada in 1987. In 2004, the National Archives of Canada and the National Library of Canada were merged to form Library and Archives Canada.

== History ==
=== Predecessors ===
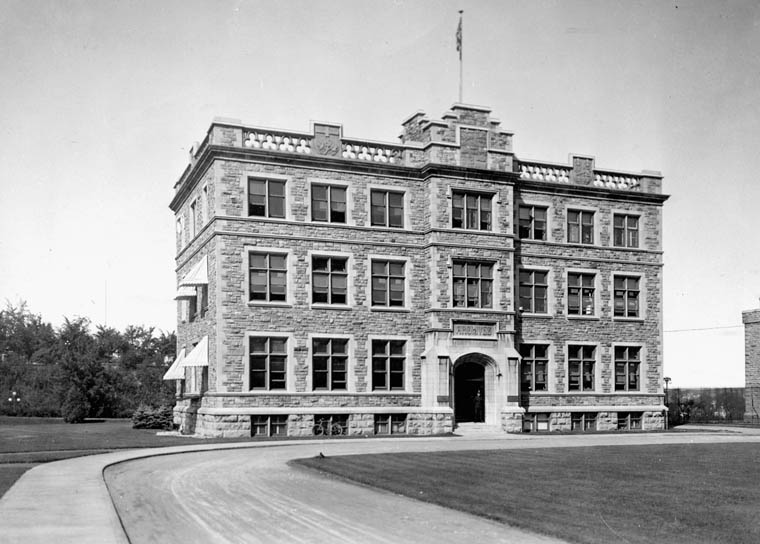
The Public Archives of Canada building in 1923, prior to its 1925 expansion. The institution was housed at 330 Sussex Drive from 1906 to 1967.

The Dominion Archives was founded in 1872 as a division within the Department of Agriculture tasked with acquiring and transcribing documents related to Canadian history. In 1912, the division was transformed into an autonomous organization, Public Archives of Canada, with the new responsibility of managing government documents on all types of media. The organization would be renamed in 1987 as the National Archives of Canada.

With the efforts of people like Freda Farrell Waldon, the first president of the Canadian Library Association, the National Library of Canada was founded in 1953.

=== 21st century ===
In 2004, under the initiative of former National Librarian Roch Carrier and National Archivist Ian E. Wilson, the functions of the National Archives of Canada and the National Library of Canada were combined to form Library and Archives Canada. LAC was established per the Library and Archives of Canada Act (Bill C-8), proclaimed on April 22, 2004, with a subsequent Order-in-Council on May 21, which formally united the collections, services, and personnel of the National Archives of Canada and the National Library of Canada. Wilson assumed the position as the first Librarian and Archivist of Canada in July that year. In February 2026, the prime ministerial archive of the Stephen Harper government opened, featuring an oral history, digital records, and others.

==== Modernization ====
In June 2004, LAC issued a discussion paper titled Creating a New Kind of Knowledge Institution; after consultation in June 2006, it issued LAC Directions for Change, a document setting out five key directions to define the new institution, including being a new kind of knowledge institution; becoming a truly national institution, a collaborative institution that works to strengthen Canada's documentary heritage; a learning destination; and an institution in government information management.

LAC's modernization policy provides for transformation from an institution focused on the acquisition and preservation of analogue (non-digital) materials to one that excels in digital access and digital preservation. A Documentary Heritage Management Framework developed in 2009 seeks the right balance between resources dedicated to analogue and digital materials and is based on:

- three main business pillars: acquisition, preservation and resource discovery (resource discovery includes description, discovery, access and services to the public)
- four guiding principles for fulfilling its documentary heritage mandate, i.e. significance, sufficiency, sustainability and society (broad social context)
- four key roles, i.e. foundation building (relationship building), collaboration, program (integrated collection management processes) and transfer (formal agreements with third parties to fulfill its legislated mandate).

Eight pilot research projects were initiated to validate the framework, including projects on military documentary heritage, aboriginal documentary heritage, and stewardship of newspapers in a digital age. In March 2010 LAC issued its final report on Canadian Digital Information Strategy stakeholder consultations initiated in accordance with its mandate to facilitate co-operation among Canadian knowledge communities. In the same month it issued Shaping Our Continuing Memory Collectively: A Representative Documentary Heritage, a document which outlines how it plans to achieve its modernization objectives.

Despite LAC's stated objectives of continuing to fulfill its mandate by adapting to changes in the information environment and collaboration with others, the actual experience since 2004 has been a reduction in both services and collaboration. Federal funding cuts since 2004 have also impacted on LAC services and acquisitions. A detailed timeline of relevant developments and the decline in LAC services since 2004 has been compiled by the Ex Libris Association.

==== Budget cuts ====
Following the announcement in the 2012 federal budget of a CDN$9.6 million funding cut over the three years commencing in 2012–13, more than 400 LAC employees received notices which indicated their jobs may be affected and the department announced a 20% reduction of its workforce of about 1,100 over the following three years. The "harsh" wording of a 23-page code of conduct for employees effective January 2013, which "spells out values, potential conflicts of interest and expected behaviours", has been criticized by the Association of Canadian Archivists and the Canadian Association of University Teachers among others. The code describes personal activities including teaching and speaking at or attending conferences as "high risk" activities "with regard to conflict of interest, conflict of duties and duty of loyalty" and participation in such activities is subject to strict conditions. In a section on duty of loyalty, it also cautions employees about expressing personal opinions in social media forums. Only authorized LAC spokespersons may issue statements or make public comments about LAC's mandate and activities, which includes controversial changes related to modernization and budget cuts.

Changes introduced under the management of Ian E. Wilson and Daniel J. Caron have been the subject of controversy and public criticism. Caron asserted that radical change is needed to cope with the influx and demand for digital material and they are subject to federal budget constraints.

Several individuals and organizations voiced concerns about these changes. In 2011, the Canadian Association of University Teachers launched the Save Library & Archives Canada campaign. On May 2, 2012, the Canadian Library Association expressed concern about budget cuts to libraries, both in federal departments and at LAC. In August 2012, the Bibliographical Society of Canada wrote to every Member of Parliament urging them to ensure budget cuts do not compromise LAC's legislated mandate. In a follow-up letter to Heritage Minister James Moore in November 2012, the Society singled out the termination of interlibrary loans as a particularly harmful decision. Bibliophile blogger Nigel Beale characterizes LAC as "Canada's national disgrace" in his blog Literary Tourist. Academic Ian Milligan describes LAC's "rhetoric of modernization" as a "smokescreen" for cutting services in light of the insignificance of and limited accessibility to LAC's online collections on the ActiveHistory.ca website. Historian Valerie Knowles outlines the impact of government cutbacks at LAC and federal government libraries in her article "Closing doors on Canada's history" on the iPolitics website.

On May 31, 2012, the Association of Canadian Archivists announced its withdrawal from forums of LAC's Pan-Canadian Documentary Heritage Network, stating that it does not believe the network can meet the needs and interests of archives across Canada previously met by the National Archival Development Program abruptly terminated by LAC following the 2012 federal funding cut.

Following Caron's resignation in May 2013, a stakeholder coalition issued a joint statement on the qualities of a successful Librarian and Archivist of Canada for official consideration in what they consider a "matter of great national significance":

A broad coalition of Canadian stakeholder organizations has developed the following list of qualities we believe the Librarian and Archivist of Canada should have in order to be successful in this critical position of public trust and responsibility. We believe it is essential that the person appointed to this position at this time possess the necessary qualities to meet the tremendous challenges of dealing with the complex issues of the digital environment in an era of limited financial and human resources and the demands of providing increased public access to the irreplaceable treasures of Canadian documentary heritage.

In June 2013 the Heritage Minister said speeding up the digitization of records will be a priority for the new Librarian and Archivist of Canada. Moore also said he will ask the person appointed to revisit the termination of the National Archival Development Program.

==== Truth and Reconciliation Commission ====
During the Canadian Truth and Reconciliation Commission, Library and Archives Canada initially failed to produce records requested by the commission in a timely and comprehensive manner and was ordered by an Ontario Superior Court judge to do so. Ultimately, LAC did provide the records, but many were not in digitized and searchable formats as required by the commission.

The Calls to Action of the final report of the Truth and Reconciliation Commission explicitly referenced Library and Archives Canada as follows:

We call upon Library and Archives Canada to: fully adopt and implement the United Nations Declaration on the Rights of Indigenous Peoples and the United Nations Joinet-Orentlicher principles, as related to Aboriginal peoples' inalienable right to know the truth about what happened and why, with regard to human rights violations committed against them in the residential schools; ensure that its record holding related to residential schools are accessible to the public; [and] commit more resources to its public education materials and programming on residential schools.

Library and Archives Canada has begun to address these concerns by dedicating funding to hire Indigenous archivists, build relationships with Indigenous communities, and support digitization efforts. However, Indigenous-led organizations have drawn attention to the fact that Indigenous communities have been conducting this type of work for decades.

LAC also holds and provides access to archival copies of the websites of organizations related to the TRC, in collaboration with the National Centre for Truth and Reconciliation, the University of Winnipeg Library, and University of Manitoba Libraries.

== Facilities ==
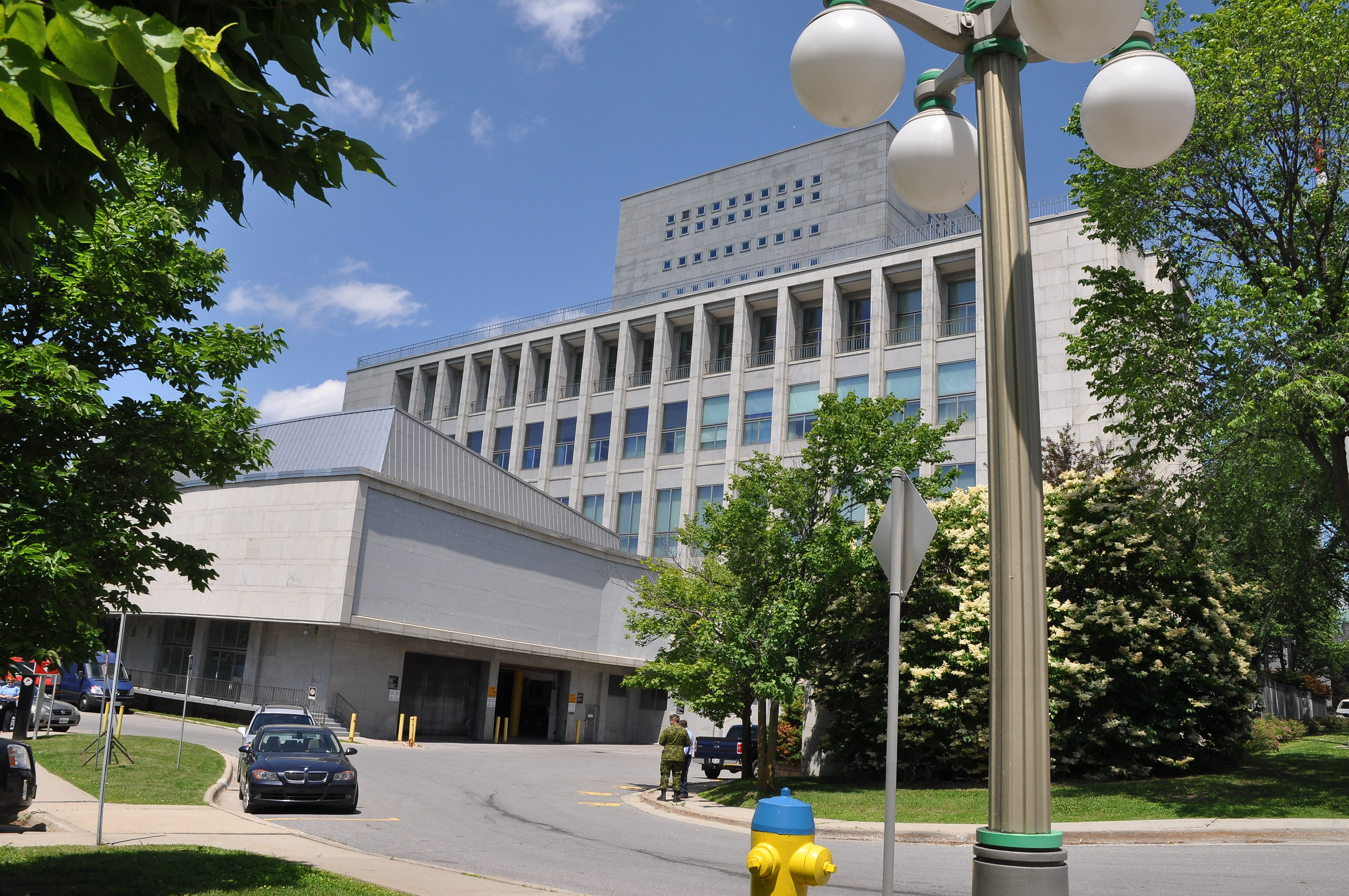
Southwestern façade

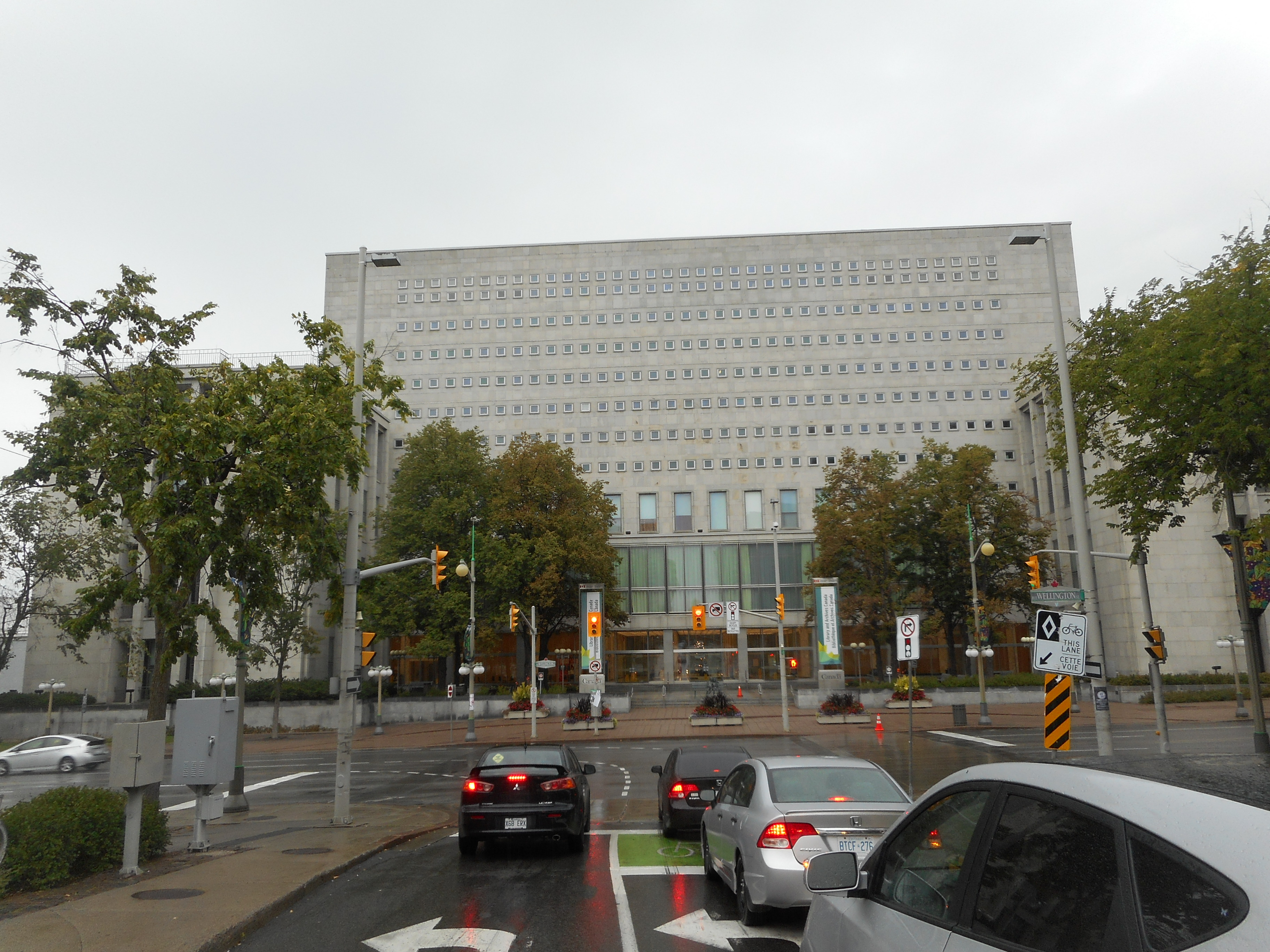
Southern façade

Exterior of the Library and Archives Canada building at 395 Wellington Street

The building at 395 Wellington Street in downtown Ottawa is the main physical location where the public may access the collection in person. The building was officially opened on June 20, 1967. With the de-emphasis on physical visits, in-person services have been curtailed—for example, since April 2012, reference services are by appointment only—and the role of this building is decreasing. There are also administrative offices in Gatineau, Quebec, and preservation and storage facilities throughout Canada for federal government records.

The Preservation Centre in the city centre of Gatineau, about 10 kilometres away from the Ottawa headquarters, was designed to provide a safe environment for the long-term storage and preservation of Canada's valuable collections. It was built at a cost of CDN$107 million, and the official opening took place on June 4, 1997. It is a unique building containing 48 climate-controlled preservation vaults and state-of-the-art preservation laboratories. In 2000, the Royal Architectural Institute of Canada named it one of the top 500 buildings constructed in Canada during the last millennium.

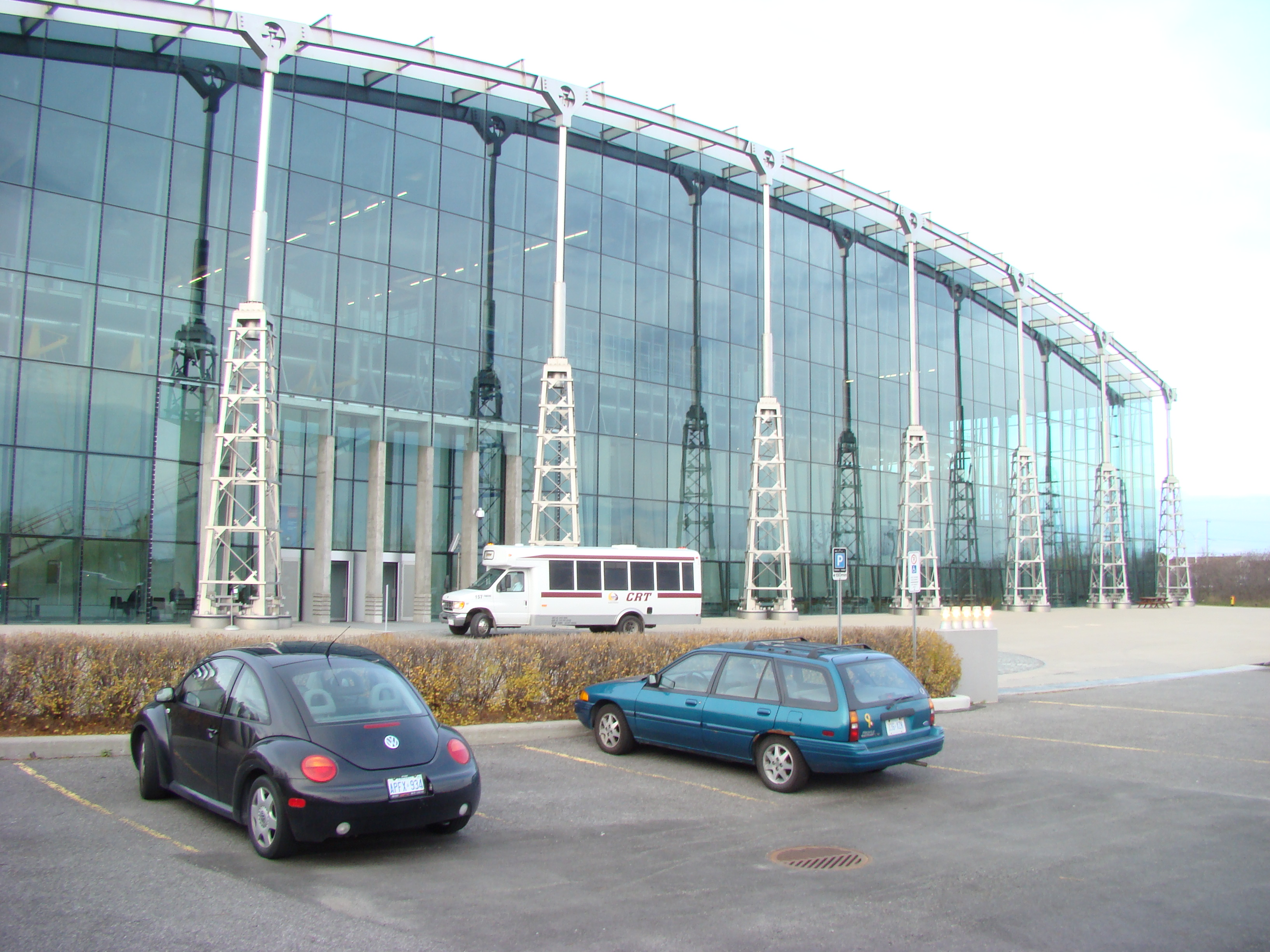
Gatineau Preservation Centre

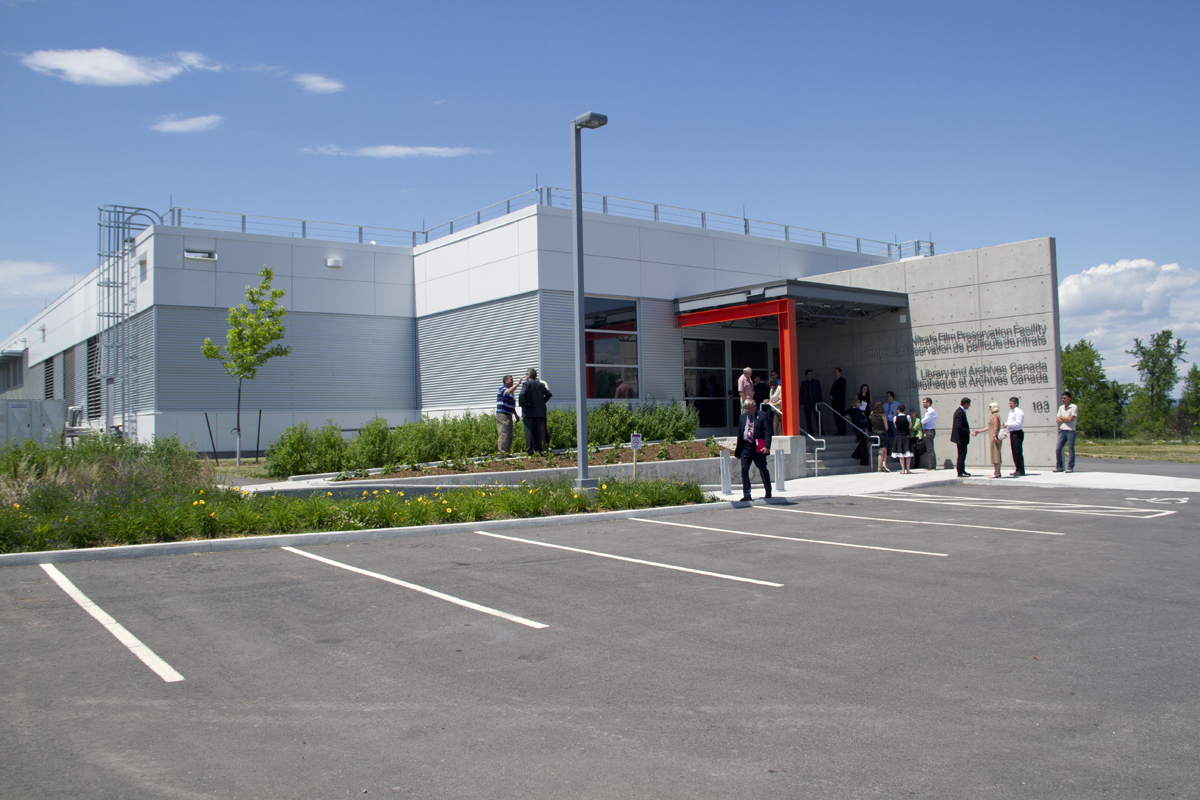
Nitrate Film Preservation Facility

Library and Archives Canada maintains several facilities throughout the National Capital Region

A Nitrate Film Preservation Facility on the Communications Research Centre campus in Shirleys Bay, on the outskirts of Ottawa, houses Canada's cellulose nitrate film collection. The collection contains 5,575 film reels dating back to 1912, including some of the first Canadian motion pictures and photographic negatives. The film material is highly sensitive and requires precise temperatures for its preservation. The state-of-the-art facility, which was officially opened on June 21, 2011, is an eco-designed building featuring an environmentally friendly roof that provides better insulation and minimizes energy expenditures.

A planned key activity for 2013–14 was to rehouse analogue (non-digital) information resources in a new state-of-the-art high-density storage facility in Gatineau, where the national newspaper collection and records of Second World War veterans will be stored. The facility will feature a high bay metal shelving system with a suitable environment to better protect Canada's published heritage. In January 2019, Library and Archives Canada announced that negotiations for a new facility to be built next to the existing one in Gatineau were starting, with an opening date in 2022.

LAC's online collection is accessible via its website and LAC provides ongoing information online via its blog, podcasts, the Twitter and Facebook social networking services, the Flickr image-sharing site, and the YouTube video-sharing site. RSS feeds provide links to new content on the LAC website and news about LAC services and resources. A new modernized website is being developed and is scheduled for completion in 2013, with both new and old websites accessible during the transition period.

A new access for public service is under construction in Ottawa; Ādisōke ("storytelling" in Anishinābemowin Algonquin) will be a joint operation with the Ottawa Public Library in a newly built, architecturally-striking building in the LeBreton Flats area, just east of downtown. It is expected to open in 2026.

== Collection ==
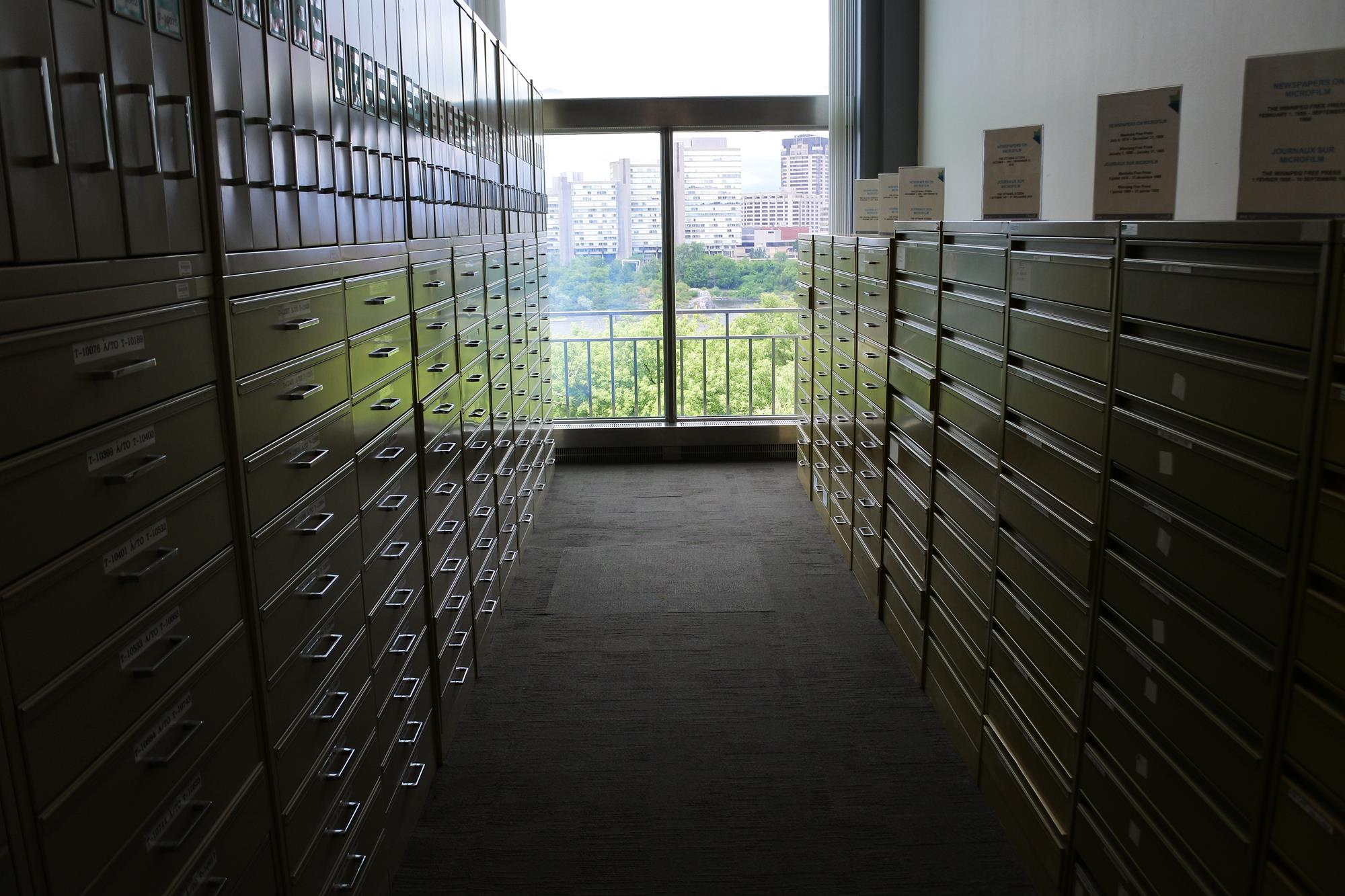
Storage units for the institution's microfilm collection at the Library and Archives Canada building.

The Library and Archives of Canada's holdings include:

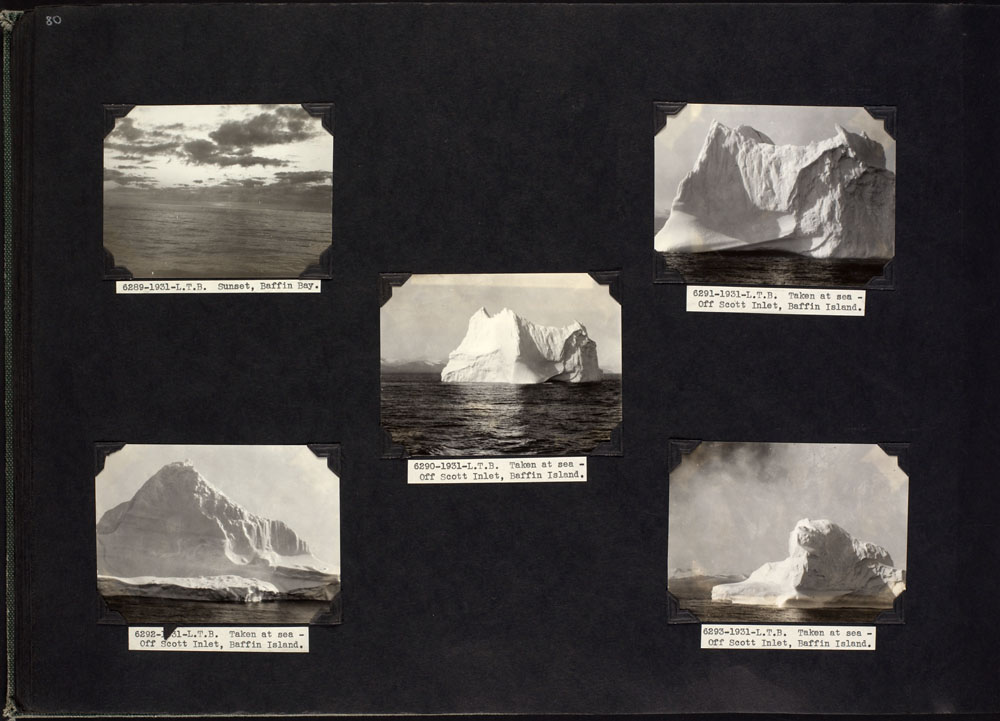
A photo album of icebergs from the Library and Archives of Canada's collection.

- 250 linear kilometres of Canadian Government and representative private textual records
  - textual archives for various individuals and groups who have contributed to the cultural, social, economic and political development of Canada
- 22 million books and publications acquired largely through legal deposit
- 24 million photographic images (including prints, negatives, slides, and digital photos)
- over 3 million architectural drawings, plans, and maps
- over 90,000 films (including short and full-length films, documentaries, and silent films)
- over 550,000 hours of audio and video recordings
- over 425,000 works of art (including watercolours, oil paintings, sketches, caricatures and miniatures, as well as medals, seals, posters and coats of arms)
- about 550,000 musical items (including the largest collection of Canadian sheet music in the world; documentation related to music in Canada; and recordings on disks and records of all formats, including piano rolls, reels and spools, and 8-track tapes)
- the Canadian Postal Archives;
- national newspapers from across Canada, including daily newspapers, student newspapers, Indigenous magazines, and ethnic community newsletters.

Notable items in the collection include:

- the Proclamation of Canada's Constitution Act, 1982, which bears marks left by raindrops during a ceremony on Parliament Hill in April 1982 when Queen Elizabeth II signed it;
- a copy of the Constitution Act, 1867 (aka the British North America Act), which features editing changes made by the first Prime Minister of Canada, Sir John A. Macdonald;
- De antiquitate Judaica: De bello Judaico ('Antiquities of the Jews and the Judean War')—the oldest book in the collection—written by 1st-century historian Flavius Josephus and printed in 1470;
- the chair used by world-renowned pianist Glenn Gould while he played and recorded.

=== Digitization ===
LAC also houses more than a petabyte of digital content. Some of this content is available online, primarily books, Canadian theses, and census material—equating to around 5 thousand terabytes of information in electronic format. Many items have not been digitized and are only available in physical form. As of May 2013, only about 1% of the collection had been digitized, representing "about 25 million of the more popular and most fragile items."

== Operations ==
Since its inception, LAC has reported to Parliament through the Minister of Canadian Identity and Culture. LAC's stated mandate is:

- to preserve the documentary heritage of Canada for the benefit of present and future generations;
- to be a source of enduring knowledge accessible to all, contributing to the cultural, social and economic advancement of Canada as a free and democratic society;
- to facilitate in Canada co-operation among communities involved in the acquisition, preservation and diffusion of knowledge;
- to serve as the continuing memory of the Government of Canada and its institutions.

LAC is expected to maintain "effective recordkeeping practices that ensure transparency and accountability".

=== Management ===
The Librarian and Archivist of Canada has the same seniority level as a deputy minister of a federal department.

On May 27, 2019, Leslie Weir was appointed Librarian and Archivist of Canada for a four-year term commencing August 30, 2019. Weir is the first woman to hold this role. Her term has been extended another four years to provide continuity through some major building projects.

The head of Canada's national archives was known as the Dominion Archivist from 1872 to 1987 and the National Archivist from 1987 to 2004.

Librarians and Archivists of Canada
Name	Period in office	Note
Librarian and Archivist of Canada
Leslie Weir	2019–incumbent	first woman to hold this role
Guy Berthiaume	2014–19	
Daniel J. Caron	2009–13	
Ian E. Wilson	2004–09	Wilson held the position of National Archivist from 1999, and transitioned from there into the role of the Librarian and Archivist of Canada with the establishment of the LAC.
National Librarian of Canada
Roch Carrier	1999–2004	
Marianne Scott	1984–99	
Guy Sylvestre	1968–83	
William Kaye Lamb	1953–68	
National/Dominion Archivist
Ian E. Wilson	1999–2004	National Archivist until the role was merged with that of the National Librarian of Canada following the establishment of the LAC. Wilson would continue as the Librarian and Archivist of Canada until 2009.
Jean-Pierre Wallot	1985–97	Dominion Archivist until position was renamed National Archivist in 1987.
Wilfred I. Smith	1970–84	Dominion Archivist
William Kaye Lamb	1948–68	Dominion Archivist
Gustave Lanctot	1937–48	Dominion Archivist
James F. Kenney	1935-37	Acting Dominion Archivist
Sir Arthur George Doughty	1904–35	Dominion Archivist. A statue of Doughty is located on the north side of the LAC building in Ottawa.
Douglas Brymner	1872–1902	Dominion Archivist

== See also ==
- Books in Canada
- List of archives in Canada
- Bibliothèque nationale de France
