= Leslie Weir =

Canadian librarian

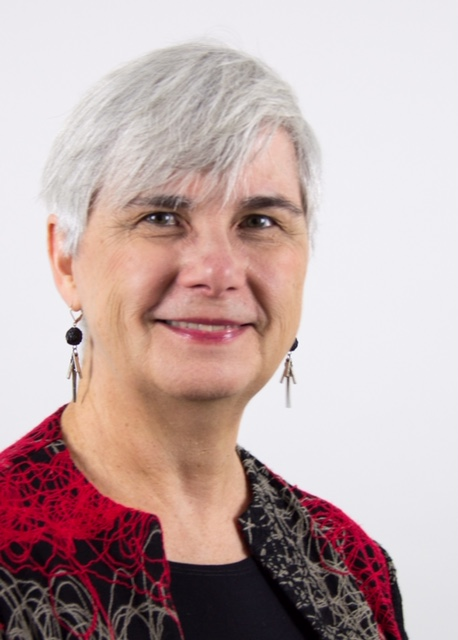
- Leslie Weir in November 2017
- Education: McGill University; Concordia University
- Occupations: Librarian; archivist
- Organization: Library and Archives of Canada
- Office: Librarian and Archivist of Canada
- Term: 30 August 2019 – present
- Website: www.bac-lac.gc.ca/eng/about-us/Pages/librarian-archivist-canada.aspx

Leslie Weir is a Canadian librarian, one of the founding architects of Scholars Portal and former president of the Canadian Association of Research Libraries. Weir was the University Librarian at the University of Ottawa from 2003 to 2018. She became the first woman to be Librarian and Archivist of Canada in 2019.

== Biography ==
Weir was born and raised in Montreal. She earned a Bachelor of Arts in Canadian History from Concordia University in 1976 and a Masters in Library Science from McGill University in 1979.

Weir joined the University of Ottawa in 1992 and was its University Librarian from 2003 to 2018. She founded the School of Information Studies in the Faculty of Arts at the University where she was also a cross-appointed Professor.

Weir was a founding member of the Board of the Canadian Research Knowledge Network (CRKN), from its inception in 2009 and from 2011 to 2015. She served as President of Canadiana.org between 2012 and 2016. Weir was president of the Canadian Association of Research Libraries from 2007 to 2009 and president of the Ontario Library Association in 2017.

In August 2025, Weir began a two-year term as President of the International Federation of Library Associations and Institutions (IFLA). She will be succeeded by Te Paea Paringatai.

== Awards ==
- 2015: CLA/Ken Haycock Award for Promoting Librarianship, awarded by the Canadian Library Association.
- 2016: Ron MacDonald Distinguished Service Award from the Canadian Research Knowledge Network (CRKN).
- 2018: Lifetime Achievement Award from the Ontario Council of University Libraries.
- 2018: Award for Distinguished Service to Research Librarianship from the Canadian Association of Research Libraries.
