= Ian E. Wilson =

Canadian archivist

Ian E. Wilson (born April 1943) is an archivist who is a former chief Librarian and Archivist of Canada. Appointed in 2004, he had previously (since July 1999) been National Archivist of Canada. With Roch Carrier, the then-National Librarian, he developed and led the process to link the National Archive and National Library as a unified institution. His career has included archival and information management, university teaching, and government service. In addition, he has lectured and published extensively on history, archives, heritage, and information management. Wilson retired as head of Library and Archives Canada (LAC) in April 2009.

== Life and work ==
Born in Montreal, Quebec, he attended the Royal Military College Saint-Jean and then obtained a bachelor's (1967) and a master's degree (1974) from Queen's University at Kingston. He began his career at the Queen's University Archives in 1967, later becoming Saskatchewan's Provincial Archivist and chair of the Saskatchewan Heritage Advisory Board from 1976 to 1986. He was appointed Archivist of Ontario in 1986, a position he held until 1999. For several years he was also responsible for the Ontario public library system.

He served as president of the Ontario Historical Society (1975–1976) and of the Champlain Society (1995–2003), and as vice-president (2000–2004) then president (2008–2012) of the International Council on Archives.

Wilson chaired the Consultative Group on Canadian Archives on behalf of the Social Sciences and Humanities Research Council. The group's report, Canadian Archives – generally known as the "Wilson Report" – was published in 1980 and has been described as "a milestone in the history of archival development in Canada."

As a librarian and archivist, he served on the Information Management Sub-Committee of the Treasury Board of Canada and was appointed the Information Management co-Champion for the Government of Canada in 2002. He has taught as an adjunct associate professor in the University of Toronto Faculty of Information and School of Graduate Studies.

He was responsible for the repatriation of the Peter Winkworth collection to Canada in 2008.

== Awards and recognition ==
In 2001, he was awarded an honorary Doctor of Letters degree from York University in recognition of his contribution to Canadian archives. In 2002, he became a Member of the Order of Canada. In 2003, he was elected Fellow of the Society of American Archivists and appointed Commandeur de l'Ordre des Arts et des Lettres by the Government of France. In 2009 Wilson became a Fellow of the Association of Canadian Archivists. In 2019, Wilson was appointed Officer of the Order of Canada.
