= Shot Darts =

New Zealand darts manufacturer

Shot Darts is a New Zealand darts equipment manufacturer based in Katikati, Bay of Plenty. The company was founded as Puma Dart Products in 1970 by John and Pat McCormick, and later became the Shot Darts brand.

The company designs and manufactures tungsten darts, dartboards and accessories, with its higher-end tungsten darts designed, sampled and manufactured in-house in Katikati. Shot Darts has been reported to export to darts stores in more than 70 countries.

== History ==
Puma Dart Products was founded in Katikati in 1970 by John and Pat McCormick. RNZ has also reported that the Katikati-based factory has been making darts for more than 50 years.

According to ExportNZ, the business began with a dartboard-making machine during a period when organised strikes at New Zealand ports disrupted the importation of sports equipment. The company subsequently began manufacturing brass darts and bristle dartboards in-house.

Puma Darts began exporting dart equipment to Australia in the early 1970s, and later expanded distribution into Europe and the United States through international trade-show relationships.

In 1992, the company launched the Bandit dartboard, a bristle dartboard using thin embedded steel bands rather than a traditional round-wire spider. ExportNZ described the Bandit as the world's first bladed dartboard, and Idealog also credited the company with developing the first bladed dartboard.

The Shot Darts brand was launched in 2009. Darts Corner has reported that Puma Dart Products continued as the underlying business while Shot Darts became the company's international trading brand. BlueOcean's B2B Inspired podcast has also described the rebrand as part of the company's shift from a small family business in Katikati to an international darts brand.

== Manufacturing and design ==
Shot Darts manufactures high-end tungsten darts at its factory in Katikati, Bay of Plenty. In 2020, the Bay of Plenty Times reported that the company operated CNC machinery and a plating plant at the site.

Idealog reported that Shot's production and design team had more than 150 years of combined experience, and that its higher-end tungsten darts were designed, sampled and manufactured in-house. The design process was reported to include hand-drawn concepts, computer-aided design, CNC machining, coating, laser etching, pointing, packing and hand matching.

The company has also invested in in-house coating and plating equipment for dart production.

== Professional darts ==
Shot Darts has produced or sponsored darts equipment for professional players. Idealog reported that the company had manufactured ranges associated with Michael van Gerwen and Max Hopp, and that Hopp was co-sponsored by Shot.

In 2023, Shot Darts signed English professional darts player Michael Smith, then the Professional Darts Corporation world champion and world number one. The Bay of Plenty Times reported that an exclusive Michael Smith signature range was designed and manufactured at Shot's factory in Katikati.

Darts Corner has also reported that Shot has signed or sponsored professional players including Ritchie Edhouse and Ben Robb.

== Recognition ==
In 2022, Shot Darts was named as a finalist in the New Zealand International Business Awards in the Excellence in Brand Storytelling category.
