= List of schools in the Bay of Plenty Region =

The Bay of Plenty Region is a region in the North Island of New Zealand. It contains numerous small rural primary schools, some small-town primary and secondary schools, and city schools in Tauranga and Rotorua.

Schools in Rotorua Lakes that are located in the Waikato region are listed here. Schools in the Taupō District that are located in the Bay of Plenty Region are listed at list of schools in the Waikato Region.

In New Zealand schools, students begin formal education in Year 1 at the age of five. Year 13 is the final year of secondary education. Years 14 and 15 refer to adult education facilities. State schools are those fully funded by the government and at which no fees for tuition of domestic students (i.e. New Zealand citizens and permanent residents, and Australian citizens) can be charged, although a donation is commonly requested. A state integrated school is a former private school with a special character based on a religious or philosophical belief that has been integrated into the state system. State integrated schools charge "attendance dues" to cover the building and maintenance of school buildings, which are not owned by the government, but otherwise they like state schools cannot charge fees for tuition of domestic students but may request a donation. Private schools charge fees to its students for tuition, as do state and state integrated schools for tuition of international students.

The socioeconomic decile indicates the socioeconomic status of the school's catchment area. A decile of 1 indicates the school draws from a poor area; a decile of 10 indicates the school draws from a well-off area. The decile ratings used here come from the Ministry of Education Te Kete Ipurangi website and from the decile change spreadsheet listed in the references. The deciles were last revised using information from the 2006 Census. The roll of each school changes frequently as students start school for the first time, move between schools, and graduate. The rolls given here are those provided by the Ministry of Education are based on figures from July 2026. The Ministry of Education institution number links to the Education Counts page for each school.

== Western Bay of Plenty District ==
Name	Years	Gender	Area	Authority	Decile	Roll	Website	MOE
ACG Tauranga	1–13	Coed	Pyes Pa	Private		411		707
Fairhaven School	1–6	Coed	Te Puke	State	5	484		1717
Kaimai School	1–8	Coed	McLaren Falls	State	7	58		1758
Katikati College	7–13	Coed	Katikati	State	6	839		117
Katikati Primary School	1–6	Coed	Katikati	State	5	527	-	1765
Maketu School	1–6	Coed	Maketu	State	2	44	-	1794
Matahui Road School	1–8	Coed	Aongatete	Private	9	50		1185
Omokoroa Point School	1–8	Coed	Omokoroa	State	9	327	-	1862
Omokoroa No.1 School	1–8	Coed	Omokoroa	State	10	319		1863
Oropi School	1–8	Coed	Oropi	State	9	298		1870
Otamarakau School	1–8	Coed	Otamarakau	State	5	63		1872
Paengaroa School	1–6	Coed	Paengaroa	State	4	199		1882
Pahoia School	1–6	Coed	Pahoia	State	8	169		1884
Pongakawa School	1–8	Coed	Pongakawa	State	5	315	-	1899
Pukehina School	1–8	Coed	Pukehina	State	3	13	-	1904
Pyes Pā School	1–8	Coed	Pyes Pa	State	9	244		1916
Rangiuru School	1–8	Coed	Rangiuru	State	6	98	-	1921
Te Kura o Te Moutere o Matakana	1–8	Coed	Matakana Island	State	3	30	-	1811
Te Puke High School	9–13	Coed	Te Puke	State	5	1,104		123
Te Puke Intermediate	7–8	Coed	Te Puke	State	4	518		2015
Te Puke Primary School	1–6	Coed	Te Puke	State	3	306		2016
Te Puna School	1–8	Coed	Te Puna	State	8	248		2017
Te Ranga School	1–8	Coed	Te Ranga	State	5	177		2019
TKKM o Te Matai	1–8	Coed	Te Puke	State	2	43	-	2011
Waihi Beach School	1–6	Coed	Waihi Beach	State	6	269	-	2048
Whakamarama School	1–8	Coed	Whakamarama	State	8	85	-	2079

== Tauranga City ==
Name	Years	Gender	Area	Authority/Type	Opened	Roll	Website	MOE	ERO
Aquinas College	7–13	Coed	Pyes Pa	State integrated Catholic	2003	840		482	482
Arataki School	1–6	Coed	Arataki	State		568		1686	1686
Bellevue School	1–6	Coed	Bellevue	State		291		1694	1694
Bethlehem College	1–13	Coed	Bethlehem	State integrated	1988	2,108		77	77
Bethlehem School	1–6	Coed	Bethlehem	State		426	-	1697	1697
Brookfield School	1–6	Coed	Brookfield	State		325		1699	1699
Gate Pa School	1–6	Coed	Gate Pa	State		382		1992	1992
Golden Sands School	1–6	Coed	Papamoa Beach	State	2011	496		6070	
Greenpark School	1–6	Coed	Greerton	State		701	–	1729	1729
Greerton Village School	1–6	Coed	Greerton	State		371		1730	1730
Matua School	1–6	Coed	Matua	State		521		1820	1820
Maungatapu School	1–6	Coed	Maungatapu	State		579	-	1821	1821
Merivale School	1–6	Coed	Merivale	State		160		1825	1825
Mount Maunganui College	9–13	Coed	Omanu	State	1958	1,756		118	118
Mount Maunganui Intermediate	7–8	Coed	Omanu	State		669		1837	1837
Mount Maunganui Primary School	1–6	Coed	Mt Maunganui	State		409		1838	1838
Omanu School	1–6	Coed	Omanu	State		543		1860	1860
Otumoetai College	9–13	Coed	Bellevue	State	1965	2,002		120	120 120
Otumoetai Intermediate	7–8	Coed	Bellevue	State		949		1878	1878
Otumoetai Primary School	1–6	Coed	Otūmoetai	State		559		1879	1879
Pāpāmoa College	7–13	Coed	Papamoa	State	2011	1,869		6963	6963
Papamoa Primary School	1–6	Coed	Papamoa	State		582		1885	1885
Pillans Point School	1–6	Coed	Otūmoetai	State		487		1894	1894
Selwyn Ridge School	1–6	Coed	Welcome Bay	State	1997	467		6945	6945
St Mary's Catholic School	1–6	Coed	Tauranga South	State integrated Catholic		465		1959	1959
St Thomas More Catholic School	1–6	Coed	Arataki	State integrated Catholic		100	-	1636	1636
Suzanne Aubert Catholic School	1-6	Coed	Papamoa	State integrated Catholic	2021	-		846	846
Tahatai Coast School	1–8	Coed	Papamoa	State	1996	785		6742	6742
Taumata School	1–8	Coed	Pyes Pa	State	2019	636		485	485
Tauranga Adventist School	1–8	Coed	Bethlehem	State integrated		115		4144	4144
Tauranga Boys' College	9–13	Boys	Tauranga South	State	1958	2,288		121	121
Tauranga Girls' College	9–13	Girls	Gate Pa	State	1958	1,456		122	122
Tauranga Intermediate	7–8	Coed	Tauranga South	State		1,217		1990	1990
Tauranga Primary	1–8	Coed	Tauranga Central	State		458		1991	1991
Tauranga Special School	–	Coed	Tauranga South	State		129		1762	1762
Tauranga Waldorf School	1–8	Coed	Welcome Bay	State integrated		203		1187	1187
Tauriko School	1–8	Coed	Tauriko	State		231	-	1994	
Te Akau ki Papamoa Primary School	1–6	Coed	Papamoa	State	2000	492		6940	
Te Kura o Matapihi	1–6	Coed	Matapihi	State		175	-	1815	1815
Te Manawa ō Pāpāmoa School	1-6	Coed	Papamoa	State	2022	491	-	724	724
Te Whakatipuranga	–	–	Poike	State		0	–	2751	2751
Te Wharekura o Mauao	7–13	Coed	Bethlehem	State		286		6962	6962
TKKM o Otepou	1–8	Coed	Welcome Bay	State		68		1873	1873
TKKM o Te Kura Kokiri	1–13	Coed	Papamoa	State		264		558	558
Welcome Bay School	1–6	Coed	Welcome Bay	State		284		2076	2076

== Rotorua District ==
Name	Years	Gender	Area	Authority	Decile	Roll	Website	MOE	ERO
Aorangi School	1–6	Coed	Western Heights	State	2	84	-	1683	1683
Broadlands School	1–6	Coed	Reporoa	State	9	122		1698	1698
Glenholme School	1–6	Coed	Glenholme	State	3	326		1724	1724
Horohoro School	1–8	Coed	Horohoro	State	2	39	-	1745	1745
John Paul College	7–13	Coed	Utuhina	State integrated	7	1,098		532	532
Kaharoa School	1–8	Coed	Kaharoa	State	9	176	-	1756	1756
Kaingaroa Forest Kohanga Reo	1–8	Coed	Kaingaroa Forest	State	1	25	-	1759	1759
Kaitao Intermediate	7–8	Coed	Western Heights	State	2	251		1761	1761
Kawaha Point School	1–6	Coed	Kawaha Point	State	3	228		1766	1766
Kea Street Specialist School	–	Coed	Selwyn Heights	State	2	113	-	1772	1772
Lake Rerewhakaaitu School	1–8	Coed	Lake Rerewhakaaitu	State	6	72	-	1787	1787
Lake Rotoma School	1–8	Coed	Lake Rotoma	State	4	25	-	1788	1788
Lynmore Primary School	1–6	Coed	Lynmore	State	9	631		1791	1791
Malfroy School	1–6	Coed	Utuhina	State	3	287	-	1796	1796
Mamaku School	1–8	Coed	Mamaku	State	3	91		1797	1797
Mihi School	1–6	Coed	Mihi	State	7	16		1826	1826
Mokoia Intermediate	7–8	Coed	Ōwhata	State	5	332		1832	1832
Ngakuru School	1–8	Coed	Ngakuru	State	9	56		1846	1846
Ngongotaha School	1–6	Coed	Ngongotahā	State	3	388		1852	1852
Otonga School	1–6	Coed	Springfield	State	9	501		1875	1875
Owhata School	1–6	Coed	Ōwhata	State	3	228		1881	1881
Reporoa College	7–13	Coed	Reporoa	State	6	205		164	164
Reporoa Primary School	1–6	Coed	Reporoa	State	8	84		1923	1923
Rotokawa School	1–6	Coed	Holdens Bay	State	5	171		1931	1931
Rotorua Boys' High School	9–13	Boys	Utuhina	State	4	1,153		152	152
Rotorua Girls' High School	9–13	Girls	Hillcrest	State	4	642		153	153
Rotorua Intermediate	7–8	Coed	Victoria	State	4	656		1933	1933
Rotorua Lakes High School	9–13	Coed	Ōwhata	State	5	630		154	154
Rotorua Seventh-day Adventist School	1–8	Coed	Glenholme	State integrated	4	45		4129	4129
Rotorua Primary School	1–8	Coed	Utuhina	State	2	385		1934	1934
Rotorua School for Young Parents	–	–	Mangakakahi	State	1	0	–	2753	2753
Selwyn School	1–6	Coed	Selwyn Heights	State	2	324		1939	1939
St Mary's Catholic School	1–6	Coed	Glenholme	State integrated	5	451		1958	1958
St Michael's Catholic School	1–6	Coed	Western Heights	State integrated	3	100		1960	1960
Sunset Primary School	1–6	Coed	Mangakakahi	State	1	167	-	1970	1970
TKKM o Hurungaterangi	1–8	Coed	Mangakakahi	State	1	92	-	3103	3103
TKKM o Rotoiti	1–8	Coed	Rotoiti Forest	State	2	38	-	1929	1929
TKKM o Ruamata	1–13	Coed	Tikitere	State	2	282		1165	1165
TKKM o Te Koutu	1–13	Coed	Koutu	State	3	382		1153	1153
Upper Atiamuri School	1–8	Coed	Ātiamuri	State	5	56	-	2044	2044
Waikite Valley School	1–8	Coed	Waikite Valley	State	10	81	-	2055	2055
Westbrook School	1–6	Coed	Westbrook	State	4	474		2077	2077
Western Heights High School	9–13	Coed	Western Heights	State	4	1,205		151	151
Western Heights School	1–6	Coed	Western Heights	State	2	421		2078	2078
Whakarewarewa School	1–8	Coed	Whakarewarewa	State	2	127		2081	2081
Whangamarino School	1–8	Coed	Okere Falls	State	3	134		2083	2083

== Whakatane District ==
Name	Years	Gender	Area	Authority	Decile	Roll	Website	MOE
Allandale School	1–6	Coed	Whakatāne	State	3	339		1681
Apanui School	1–6	Coed	Whakatāne	State	5	419	-	1684
Awakeri School	1–8	Coed	Awakeri	State	6	335		1691
Edgecumbe College	9–13	Coed	Edgecumbe	State	3	129		145
Edgecumbe School	1–8	Coed	Edgecumbe	State	2	163		1711
Galatea School	1–8	Coed	Galatea	State	7	123		1722
James Street School	1–6	Coed	Whakatāne	State	2	240		1755
Matata Public School	1–8	Coed	Matatā	State	5	98		1818
Murupara Area School	1–13	Coed	Murupara	State	1	164		658
Nukuhou North School	1–8	Coed	Waimana	State	4	55		1854
Ohope Beach School	1–6	Coed	Ōhope Beach	State	9	218		1857
Otakiri School	1–8	Coed	Otakiri	State	6	159		1871
St Joseph's Catholic School (Matatā)	1–8	Coed	Matatā	State integrated	2	36	-	1948
St Joseph's Catholic School (Whakatāne)	1–8	Coed	Whakatāne	State integrated	6	259		1955
Taneatua School	1–8	Coed	Tāneatua	State	1	130	-	1978
Tawera Bilingual School	1–8	Coed	Ruatoki	State	3	35	-	1996
Thornton School	1–8	Coed	Thornton	State	5	152	-	2028
TKK Motuhake o Tawhiuau	1–13	Coed	Murupara	State	1	90		463
TKKM o Huiarau	1–13	Coed	Ruatāhuna	State	1	56	-	1748
TKKM o Te Orini ki Ngati Awa	1-8	Coed	Coastlands	State		96	-	719
Te Kura Mana Māori o Matahi	1–8	Coed	Matahi	State	1	16	-	1809
Te Kura Maori-a-Rohe o Waiohau	1–13	Coed	Waiohau	State	1	87	-	2062
Te Kura o Te Paroa	1–8	Coed	Paroa	State	2	288		1888
Te Kura o Te Teko	1–8	Coed	Te Teko	State	1	140	-	2023
Te Kura Toitu o Te Whaiti-nui-a-Toi	1–13	Coed	Te Whaiti	State	1	15	-	545
Te Mahoe School	1–8	Coed	Te Mahoe	State	1	33	-	2009
Te Wharekura o Ruatoki	1–13	Coed	Ruatoki	State	1	231		221
Trident High School	9–13	Coed	Whakatāne	State	5	843		143
Waimana School	1–8	Coed	Waimana	State	1	22		2057
Whakatane High School	9–13	Coed	Whakatāne	State	4	1,235		144
Whakatane Intermediate	7–8	Coed	Whakatāne	State	4	586		2082
Whakatane Seventh-day Adventist School	1–8	Coed	Whakatāne	State integrated	5	52	-	1170

== Kawerau District ==
Name	Years	Gender	Area	Authority	Decile	Roll	Website	MOE	ERO
Kawerau Putauaki School	1–6	Coed	Kawerau	State	1	127		655	655
Kawerau South School	1–6	Coed	Kawerau	State	1	331		1770	1770
Kawerau Teen Parent Unit	–	–	Kawerau	State	1	0	–	2758	2758
Tarawera High School	7–13	Coed	Kawerau	State	1	452	–	661	661
Te Whata Tau o Putauaki	1–8	Coed	Kawerau	State	1	96	–	651	651

== Ōpōtiki District ==
Name	Years	Gender	Area	Authority	Decile	Roll	Website	MOE
Ashbrook School	1–8	Coed	Ōpōtiki	State	1	67	-	1689
Kutarere School	1–8	Coed	Kutarere	State	2	19	-	1786
Omarumutu School	1–8	Coed	Omarumutu	State	1	70	-	1861
Opotiki College	9–13	Coed	Ōpōtiki	State	1	350		148
Opotiki Primary School	1–8	Coed	Ōpōtiki	State	1	318		1866
St Joseph's Catholic School	1–8	Coed	Ōpōtiki	State integrated	2	150		1950
Te Kura Mana Maori Maraenui	1–8	Coed	Hāwai	State	1	32		1806
Te Kura Mana Maori o Whangaparaoa	1–8	Coed	Cape Runaway	State	1	79	-	2084
Te Kura o Te Whanau-a-Apanui	1–13	Coed	Omaio	State	–	190	-	742
Te Kura o Torere	1–8	Coed	Tōrere	State	1	32		1645
TKKM o Waioweka	1–8	Coed	Waioeka	State	1	67	-	2061
Waiotahe Valley School	1–8	Coed	Waiotahe	State	3	107	-	2063
Woodlands School	1–8	Coed	Ōpōtiki	State	3	177		2092
