= AIMS Games =

Annual Australasian Youth Sports Event

Zespri AIMS Games
- Motto: "Be brave, be strong but always be humble in the world of sports"
- Purpose: Youth sports competition promoting skill development, sportsmanship and community
- Inaugurated: 2004; 17 schools, approximately 760 competitors
- Chairperson: Henk Popping
- Headquarters: Tauranga, New Zealand
- Website: Zespri Aims Games

The AIMS Games (Association of Intermediate and Middle Schools) (Te Reo Māori: Ngā Taumāhekeheke AIMS), currently branded as Zespri AIMS Games, is an annual multi-sport event held in Tauranga, New Zealand. The tournament attracted 166 schools in 2012, with 2025 attracting more competitors than the 2024 Paris Olympics, with 14,022 competitors, 431 schools and 27 sporting codes, making it the biggest sporting event for children aged 11 to 13 years old in New Zealand and Australasia.

== History ==
The event began in 2004, with the founding schools being Mount Maunganui Intermediate, Ōtūmoetai Intermediate, Tauranga Intermediate and Te Puke Intermediate. The first game only included 4 sports—netball, football, cross country and hockey—with 17 schools and around 760 intermediate students participating.

Since then, indoor bowls were added in 2011, followed by rugby league in 2012. As of 2025, there are 27 sports for participants to compete in, with rugby league being replaced by rippa rugby.

In 2025, The Games was awarded 'Best Non-Profit or Community Event' at the New Zealand Event Awards.

== Economics ==
In 2016, the event generated $3 million for the local economy. In 2019, the event returned $6.5 million. In 2024, the event made $8.78 million. This rate is expected to rise in the future.

== Main sponsors ==
AIMS Games has been supported by many organisations throughout the years. In 2025, some of the sponsors include:

- Zespri
- Tauranga City Council
- Mercury Energy
- Bayfair Shopping Centre
- Mainfreight
- Bay of Plenty Regional Council

== Sports ==
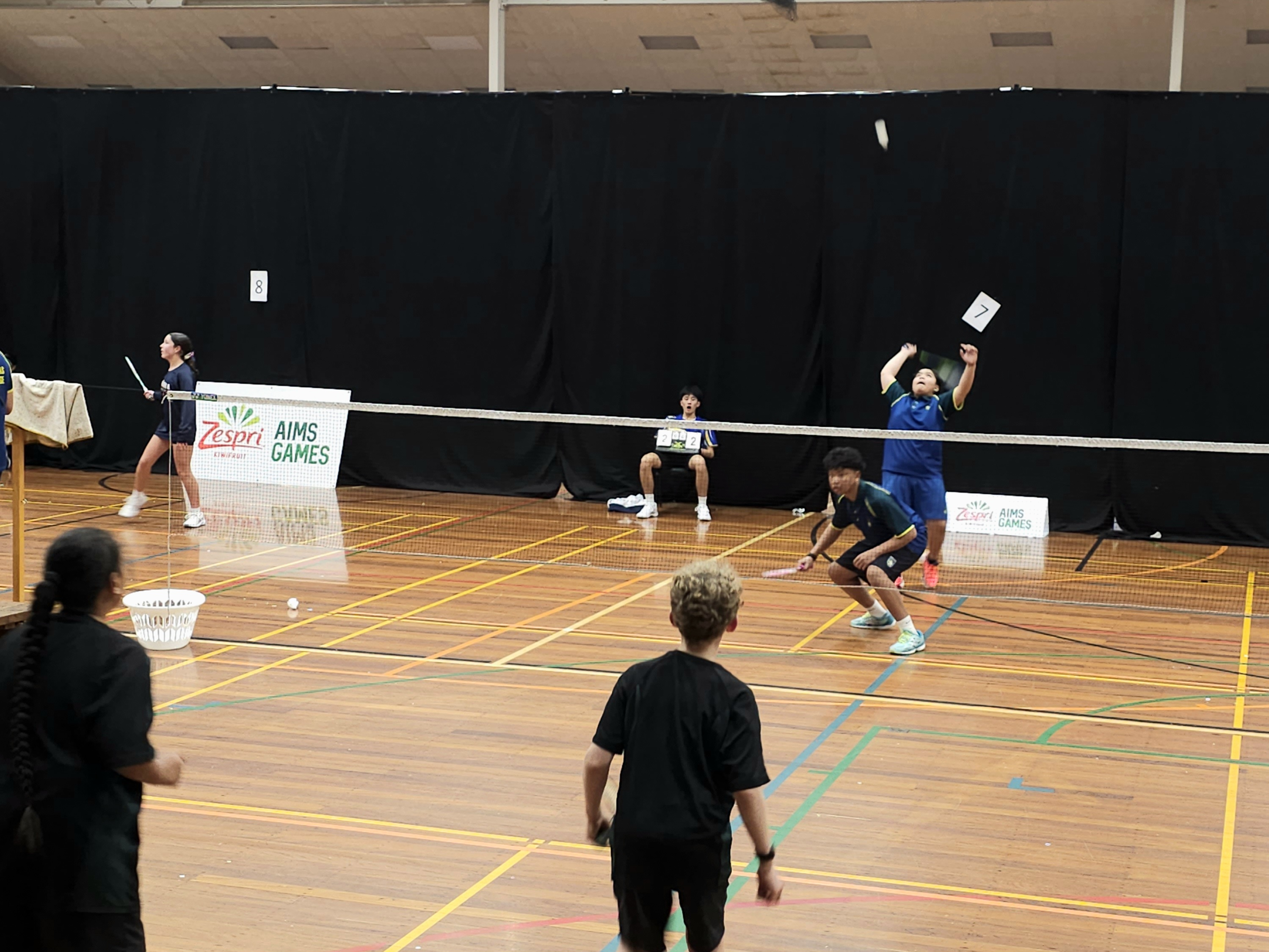
Players competing in Badminton at the 2025 AIMS Games.

The event currently has 26 sports, which are:

- Badminton
- Basketball (3x3 and 5 aside)
- BMX
- Canoe racing
- Canoe slalom
- Cross country
- Football
- Futsal
- Golf
- Gymnastics
- Hip hop
- Hockey
- Indoor bowls
- Mountain biking
- Netball
- Orienteering
- Rip rugby
- Rock climbing
- Rugby sevens
- Squash
- Surfing
- Swimming
- Table tennis
- Tennis
- Water polo
- Yachting

Separate events are also offered under swimming, cross country, table tennis and indoor bowls for students with physical, sensory, or intellectual disabilities, while in other areas these students compete alongside all students.

== Notable alumni ==
- Nathan Harris, played football
- Adam Milne, played football
