= List of historic places in Tauranga =

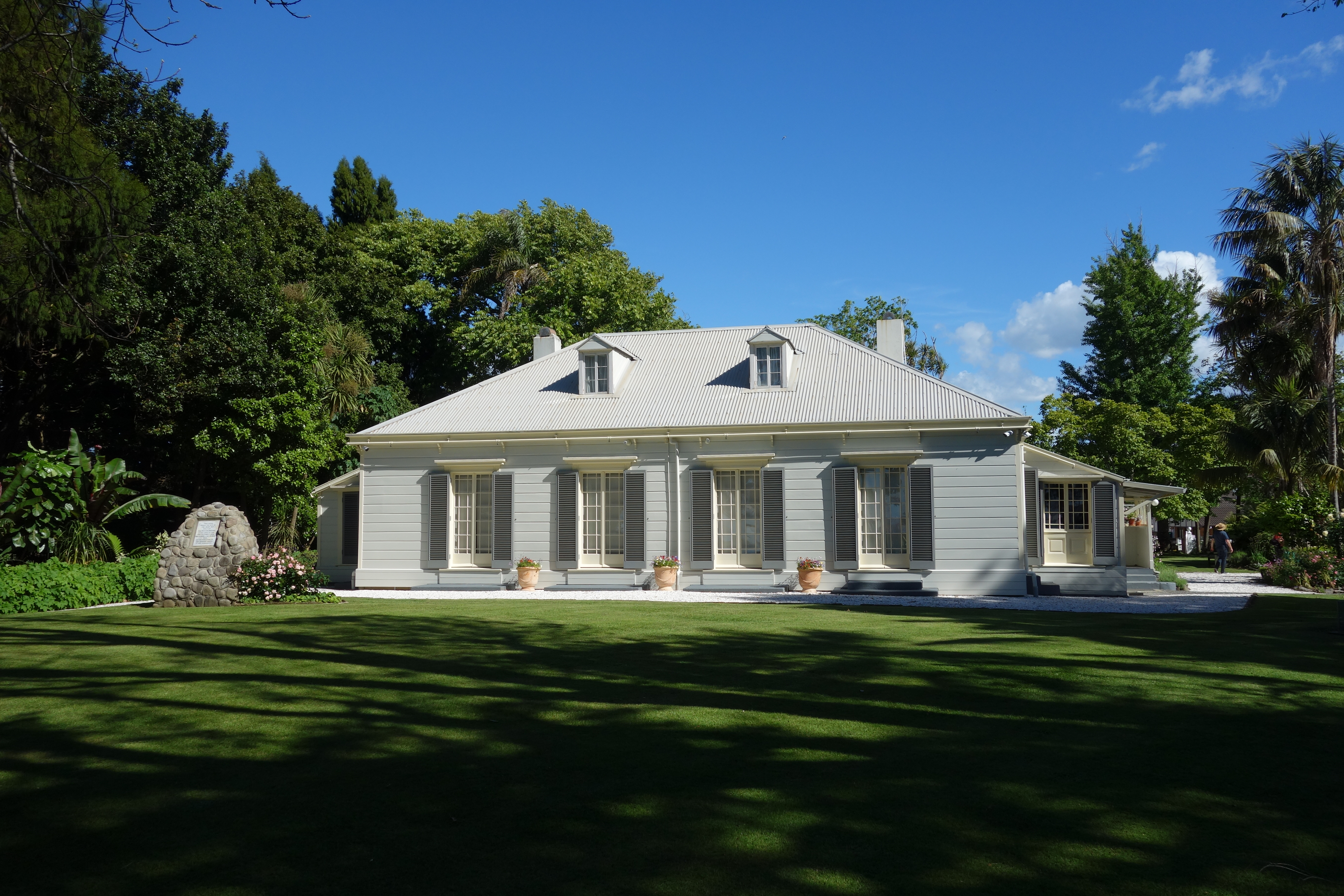
The Elms Mission House, a Category 1 Place and Historic Area in Tauranga

Tauranga is a city and territorial authority in the Bay of Plenty Region of the North Island of New Zealand. The area around Tauranga Harbour was home to large Māori settlements during the precolonial era, while European presence began in the early 1830s as traders began settling its shores. It was the site of the British Tauranga campaign against the Māori in 1864, which resulted in the confiscation of Ngāi Te Rangi land and the establishment of a military settlement in the region. Increased European settlement came in the succeeding years, resulting in the founding of the town in 1873. It was incorporated as a borough in 1882 and a city in 1961.

Heritage New Zealand classifies sites on the New Zealand Heritage List / Rārangi Kōrero in accordance with the Heritage New Zealand Pouhere Taonga Act 2014. It distinguishes between Category 1 ("places of special or outstanding historical or cultural significance") and Category 2 ("places of historic or cultural significance"). Sites containing a number of related significant places are listed as Historic Areas. Additionally, sites important to Māori communities are given special classifications, including wāhi tapu for sites of spiritual, traditional, or ritual importance; and wāhi tūpuna for sites of ancestral significance. Thirty sites in Tauranga are included on the New Zealand Heritage List, including three Category 1 sites and seventeen Category 2 sites.

== Places ==
List of historic places in Tauranga
Name	Classification	Location	Constructed	Registered	List number	Notes	Image	Ref.
Te Pā o Te Ariki	Wāhi tūpuna	Maungatapu Road, Maungatapu	—N/a	2021	9852	A Māori site associated with the Ngāti He hapū of the Ngāi Te Rangi. Contains the Maungatapu marae and Te Ariki pā.		
Te Tāhuna o Rangataua	Wāhi tapu area	Rangataua Bay, Tauranga Central	—N/a	2019	9787	A Māori area associated with the Nga Potiki hapū of the Ngāi Te Rangi. It contains Rangataua Bay.		
Hopukiore, Moturiki, Motuotau and Te Toka o Marutuahu	Wāhi tapu area	Marine Parade, Mount Maunganui	—N/a	2010	9503	Māori sites associated with the Ngai Tamawhariua hapū of the Ngāi Te Rangi. Contains Hopukiore (a hill), Moturiki (a tombolo), Motuotau (an island), and Te Toka o Marutuahu (an offshore rock).	A view overlooking two grassy islands, one connected to the shore by a thin strip	
Mauao	Wāhi tapu	Mount Maunganui	—N/a	2009	9423	A Māori site associated with the Nga Potiki hapū of the Ngāti Apa. Contains Mauao and the surrounding peninsula and outcrops.	A view of the lush mountain Mauao from across a bay	
Te Roto Horua	Wāhi tapu	Taniwha Place, Bethlehem	—N/a	2010	9244	Māori site associated with the Ngai Kahu hapū of the Ngāi Te Rangi. It contains a parcel of the bank and riverbed of the Wairoa River.		
Pukehinahina	Wāhi tapu	Cameron Road and Church Street, Gate Pa	1900	2008	7774	A Māori site associated with the Ngāti Ranginui. It contains a tomokanga (carved gateway) memorial plaque and the St George's Chapel, built in 1900 to commemorate the Battle of Gate Pā.		
Te Houhou Ki Wairakei	Wāhi tapu area	South Papamoa Beach Road, Papamoa	—N/a	2005	7641	Māori site associated with the Nga Potiki hapū of the Ngāti Apa. It contains the pā Te Houhou and the site where the Ngati Tauwhao chief Hikareia was killed.		
Tauranga Bond Store	Category 1	1 The Strand and Anson Street, Tauranga Central	1883	2008	7738	Built in 1883 as a warehouse and bond store, the building was owned by wholesale wine and spirits importers from 1908 to 1987, and has since seen various business tenants. It is the oldest remaining commercial building in Tauranga.		
Kairua	Wāhi tapu Area	Kairua Road, Papamoa	—N/a	2000	7505	Māori sites associated with the Nga Potiki hapū of the Ngāti Apa. It contains an archaeological complex including two pā, part of a larger regional pā system.		
Papamoa No.2 Burial Reserve	Wāhi tapu Area	Maranui Street, Papamoa	—N/a	2002	7499	Māori sites associated with the Nga Potiki hapū of the Ngāti Apa.		
Elms Mission Station	Historic Area	Mission Street, Tauranga Central	1838–1847	1993	7016	A Church Mission Society mission in use from the 1830s to 1870s. Contains various mission buildings, alongside one of the oldest ornamental gardens in New Zealand.	A view of a white chapel and an observation tower in a lush area	
Mangatawa	Category 2	Mangatawa Lane, Te Maunga	—N/a	1994	6705	A site of Māori cultural significance.		
Military Camp & Old Stone Steps	Category 2	Adams Avenue, Mount Maunganui	—N/a	1984	6404	An archaeological site containing the remains of a 19th-century European militia and pilot station near Mauao.		
Kinonui Pā	Category 2	Pilot Quay, Mount Maunganui	—N/a	1984	6403	A pā on the western slopes of Mauao associated with the Ngāti Pūkenga.		
Pā	Category 2	Mount Maunganui	—N/a	1984	6401	A pā on Mauao associated with the Ngāti Pūkenga.		
Maungawhare	Category 2	34 Parkvale Road, Tauranga Central	1875	1983	4571	A house built in Tudor design by Henry Stainforth Brabant in 1875. Originally known as "Woodhill", this name shifted to his second home (also a historic place) when he sold the site.		
J. C. Adams Cottage	Category 2	4 Adams Avenue, Mount Maunganui	—N/a	1987	4570	A summer home built by builder and politician John Cuthbert Adams.		
Stone Jetty / Boulder Wharf	Category 2	Mount Maunganui	1888	1987	4569	A jetty constructed in 1888 and opened in 1889 by Tauranga mayor James Bodell. It was the first wharf in Mount Maunganui.		
Hotel St Amand	Category 2	105 The Strand, Tauranga Central	1918	1987	4568	A hotel designed in 1918 by Herbert Henry Clemson, featuring reinforced concrete supports and brick infill. It supported the adjacent port, now relocated. It is now used as a restaurant and hostel.		
Native School and Hostel (former)	Category 2	83 Seventh Avenue, Tauranga Central	1878	1983	4563	A hostel in use from 1878 to 1956 to support visiting Māori from Mōtītī Island. It was assigned for use as a Māori community centre in 1963.		
Post Office/Government Building (former)	Category 1	41 Harington Street, Tauranga Central	1906	1983	4560	An Edwardian Baroque post office and government building designed by John Campbell. Mainly brick construction, with cement and roughcast siding. Now used for offices and a bistro.	A photo of the Tauranga Post Office Building, a two-storey building with a clock tower. Its first storey is red, while the second storey and roof are shades of yellow and orange.	
War Memorial Gates	Category 2	Tauranga Wharepai Domain, 45 Cameron Road, Tauranga Central	1921	1987	4567	A set of gates at the entrance to the Tauranga Domain. Commemorates and lists the names of 91 soldiers who died in the First World War.		
Foresters’ Hall	Category 2	155-159 Seventeenth Avenue, Tauranga Central	1908	1987	4566	Built in 1908 as the meeting hall of the Ancient Order of Foresters. It fell under borough council ownership in 1932, and was used by St John Ambulance and a local brass band. In 1989, it was moved to the Tauranga Historic Village.		
Topcroft	Category 2	Ranginui Road, Welcome Bay	1870	1983	4565	A house built for missionary Samuel Clarke in 1870. During the 1980s, it was moved from its original position on Edgcumbe Road to Ranginui Road.		
Taiparoro	Category 2	11 Fifth Avenue and Devonport Road, Tauranga Central	1882	1987	4564	A timber house built in Carpenter Gothic style by John Cuthbert Adams in 1882.		
House & Adjoining Shop	Category 2	405/407a and 664 Cameron Road,Tauranga Central	1877	1983	2712	A house and the adjacent Crabbe Grocery and Drapery Store were rebuilt in 1877 from an earlier store building founded ten years prior. After use by various buildings, the store portion was moved to the Tauranga Boys' College in 2002, where it is used as a uniform shop.		
The Elms (dwelling), Kitchen Block and Dairy	Category 2	15 Mission Street, Tauranga Central	1877	1983	2711	The kitchen and dairy buildings of the Elms Mission Station. Although the mission was founded in the 1830s, the domestic service buildings were rebuilt after a fire in 1877.	A view of two small white buildings with a hand water pump	
Woodhill	Category 2	167 Grange Road, Otūmoetai	1885	1983	795	A domestic Gothic residence designed by Fitzgibbon Louch for Henry Stainforth Brabant. It replaced an earlier residence also initially named Woodhill.		
Brain-Watkins House	Category 2	233 Cameron Road, Tauranga Central	1881	1983	791	A timber house built by boatbuilder Joseph Denham Brain in 1881. It was willed to the Tauranga Historical Society by his daughter in 1979, and converted into a house museum.		
The Elms Mission House and Library	Category 1	15 Mission Street, Tauranga Central	1838–1847	1983	30	A timber house and library building. Built by missionaries in the area in the 1830s, they are the oldest surviving buildings in the Bay of Plenty Region. They sit on the grounds of the Elms Historic Area.	A large white building in a grassy environment	
