= Glenholme, Rotorua =

Suburb of Rotorua, New Zealand

Glenholme
- Suburb
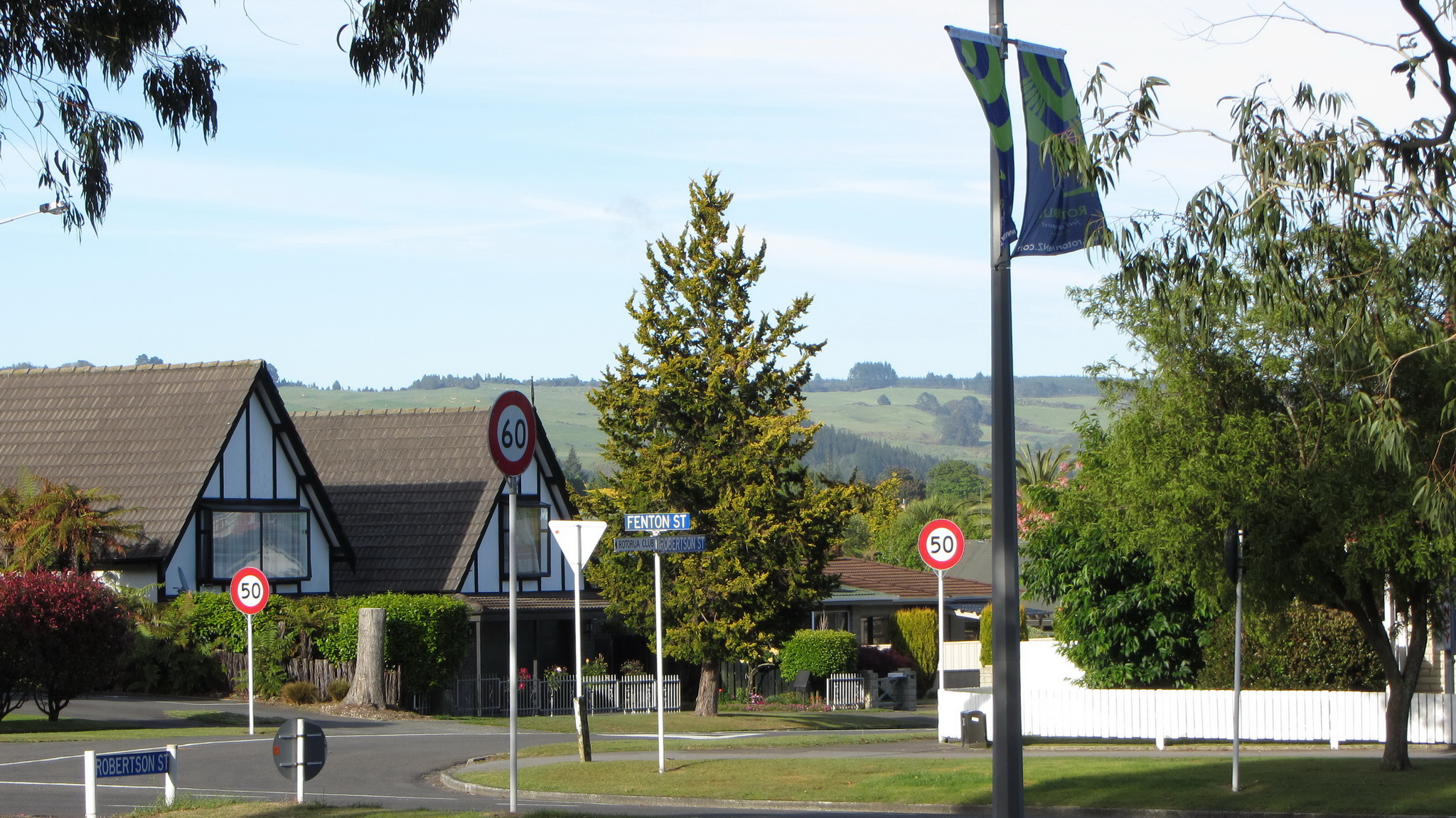
- View over Glenholme from Rydges Hotel
- Interactive map of Glenholme
- Coordinates: 38.148557°S 176.247027°E
- Country: New Zealand
- City: Rotorua
- Local authority: Rotorua Lakes Council
- Electoral ward: Te Ipu Wai Auraki General Ward

Area
  - Land: 172 ha (430 acres)

Population (June 2025)
  - Total: 5,160
  - Density: 3,000/km^{2} (7,770/sq mi)

Utuhina	Victoria	Rotorua Central
Hillcrest	Glenholme	Fenton Park
Springfield	Whakarewarewa	Whakarewarewa

Glenholme is a suburb of Rotorua in the Bay of Plenty Region of New Zealand's North Island.

== Demographics ==
Glenholme covers 1.72 km^{2} (0.66 sq mi) and had an estimated population of 5,160 as of June 2025, with a population density of 3,000 people per km^{2}.

Historical population
Year	Pop.	±% p.a.
2006	4,260	—
2013	4,278	+0.06%
2018	4,665	+1.75%
2023	4,812	+0.62%

Glenholme had a population of 4,812 in the 2023 New Zealand census, an increase of 147 people (3.2%) since the 2018 census, and an increase of 534 people (12.5%) since the 2013 census. There were 2,244 males, 2,556 females, and 15 people of other genders in 1,920 dwellings. 3.1% of people identified as LGBTIQ+. The median age was 40.2 years (compared with 38.1 years nationally). There were 879 people (18.3%) aged under 15 years, 888 (18.5%) aged 15 to 29, 2,058 (42.8%) aged 30 to 64, and 990 (20.6%) aged 65 or older.

People could identify as more than one ethnicity. The results were 54.8% European (Pākehā); 37.5% Māori; 6.1% Pasifika; 19.6% Asian; 1.2% Middle Eastern, Latin American and African New Zealanders (MELAA); and 1.6% other, which includes people giving their ethnicity as "New Zealander". English was spoken by 94.8%, Māori by 12.3%, Samoan by 0.7%, and other languages by 15.5%. No language could be spoken by 2.2% (e.g. too young to talk). New Zealand Sign Language was known by 0.9%. The percentage of people born overseas was 25.2, compared with 28.8% nationally.

Religious affiliations were 37.0% Christian, 3.1% Hindu, 1.1% Islam, 3.2% Māori religious beliefs, 1.1% Buddhist, 0.4% New Age, and 2.9% other religions. People who answered that they had no religion were 44.2%, and 7.0% of people did not answer the census question.

Of those at least 15 years old, 900 (22.9%) people had a bachelor's or higher degree, 1,947 (49.5%) had a post-high school certificate or diploma, and 1,080 (27.5%) people exclusively held high school qualifications. The median income was $36,400, compared with $41,500 nationally. 297 people (7.6%) earned over $100,000 compared to 12.1% nationally. The employment status of those at least 15 was 1,827 (46.5%) full-time, 471 (12.0%) part-time, and 180 (4.6%) unemployed.

Individual statistical areas
Name	Area (km^{2})	Population	Density (per km^{2})	Dwellings	Median age	Median income
Glenholme North	0.84	2,694	3,207	1,086	36.8 years	$32,600
Glenholme South	0.88	2,118	2,407	831	44.9 years	$42,500
New Zealand					38.1 years	$41,500

== Education ==
Glenholme School is a state primary school for Year 1 to 6 students, with a roll of 336. It opened in 1948.

St Mary's Catholic School is a state integrated Catholic school for Year 1 to 6 students, with a roll of 450. It opened in 1924 as St Michael's School, and changed to the current name in 1958. It became state integrated in 1982.

Rotorua Seventh-day Adventist School is a state integrated Seventh-day Adventist primary school for Year 1 to 8 students, with a roll of 39. The school celebrated its 70th jubilee in 2023.

All these schools are co-educational. Rolls are as of July 2025.
