= Bayfair Shopping Centre =

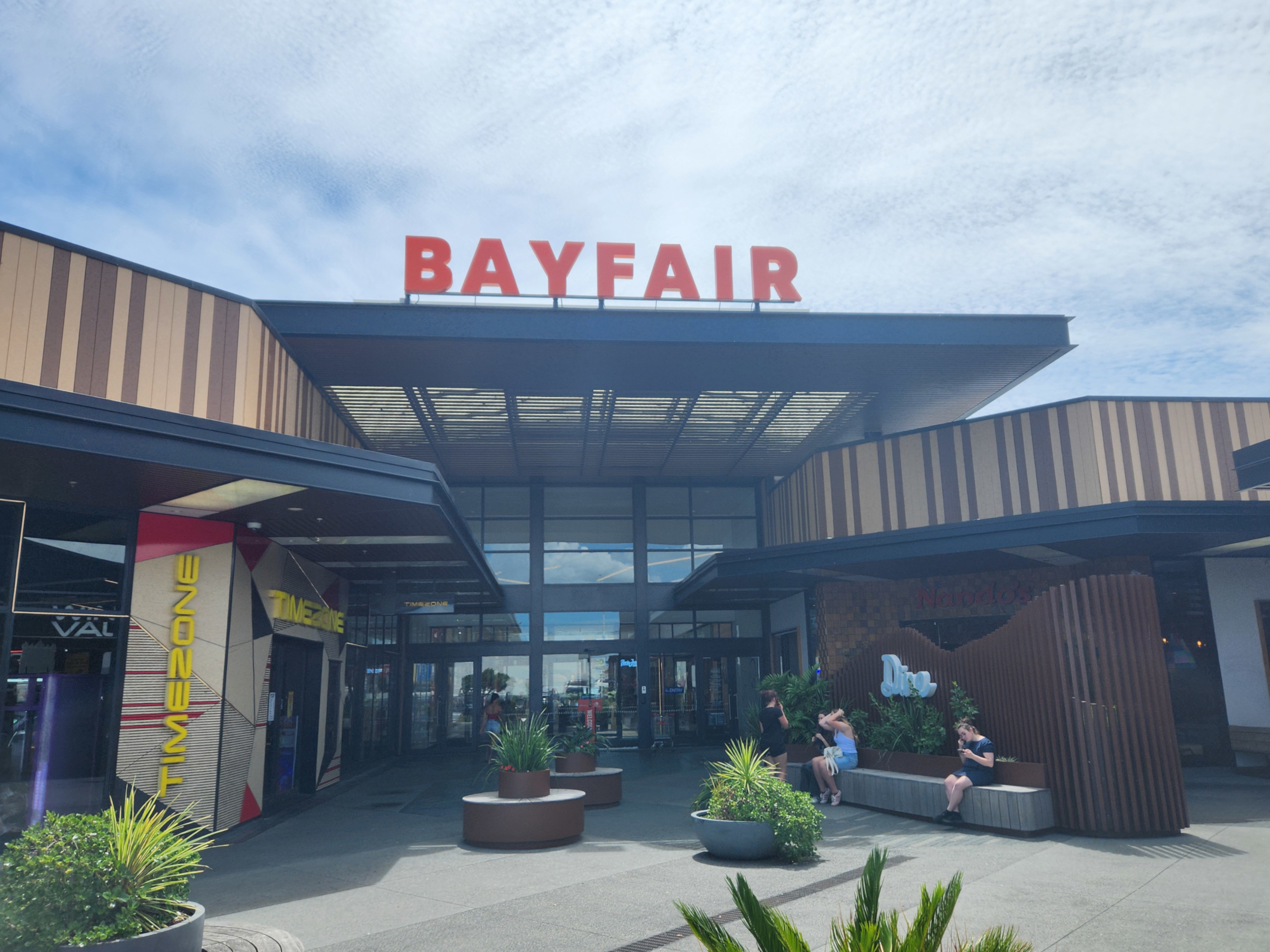
- Bayfair Shopping Centre in 2026
- Location: Tauranga, New Zealand
- Coordinates: 37°40′30″S 176°13′23″E
- Address: Corner of Maunganui Road & Girven Road Mount Maunganui Tauranga
- Opened: 8 May 1985
- Manager: Dexus
- Num. of stores: 140 approx
- Num. of anchor tenants: 3
- Floors: 1 (except Farmers, which has 2)
- Parking: 1600 spaces
- Website: bayfair.co.nz

Bayfair Shopping Centre, more commonly known as simply Bayfair, is one of the main shopping malls in Tauranga located in the suburb of Arataki. Bayfair is also known for being the first shopping mall built in Tauranga.

Bayfair is owned by Fisher Funds Management, and is managed by Dexus.

== Location ==
Bayfair Shopping Centre is located on the corner of Maunganui Road (State Highway 2) and Girven Road. The rear of the shopping centre backs onto Farm Road, and Jackson Street and Harris Street are located to the side of the building. It is across Maunganui Road from Omanu Golf Course, and across Girven Road from Baywave (a major aquatic complex).

== Facilities ==
Bayfair has three anchor stores: Woolworths, Kmart and Farmers. Up until 2018, it was home to New Zealand’s only remaining Woolworths supermarket, which had retained the Australian Woolworths branding rather than rebranding to Countdown (like all other Foodtown and Woolworths stores) due to the presence of an existing Countdown store in Bayfair. In 2023, following a nationwide rebrand by the company, the store was officially renamed Woolworths once again. Farmers is the only part of the shopping centre (other than the carpark) to be on more than one floor. There is a large foodcourt with around a dozen food retailers.

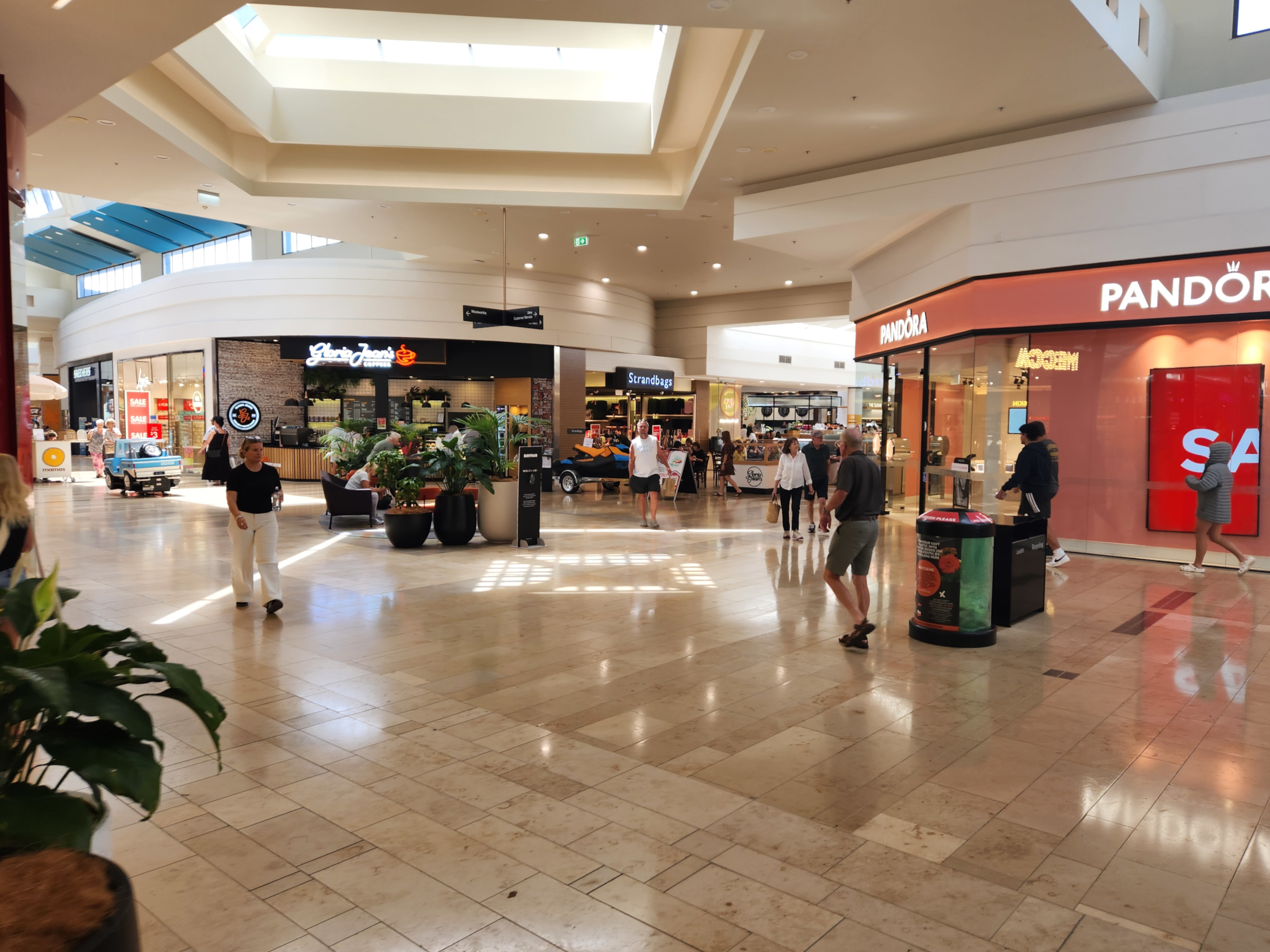
Interior of the shopping centre in 2026

== Development ==
In December 2017, a $115 million redevelopment began on Bayfair. Included in the development was a new cinema with 1,300 seats, and a new Woolworths supermarket. Over 400 workers worked on the construction.

The first stage of the redevelopment opened in December 2018. There were 30 new stores. The redevelopment was expected to end in 2019, which was expected to have 150 stores once finished. In May 2019, six new restaurants opened at Bayfair.

== Buses ==
Buses stop outside bayfair on Farm Street.

Previous timetabled stop	Route	Next timetabled stop
Terminus	CT; Crosstown	Ohauiti Road towards Toi Ohomai
Tauranga Central Station towards Terminus	02; Papamoa East	Fashion Island towards Papamoa East
Mt Maunganui towards Tauranga Central	05; Mt Maunganui	Terminus
Terminus	20; Te Puke	Tara Road towards Te Puke
Mt Maunganui towards Terminus	21; Mt Maunganui-Papamoa	Papamoa Plaza towards Terminus
Tauranga Central towards Tauranga Hospital	143; Whakatane	Papamoa Plaza towards Te Puke

== See also ==
- List of shopping centres in New Zealand
