= Tauranga South =

Suburb of Tauranga, New Zealand

- Suburb
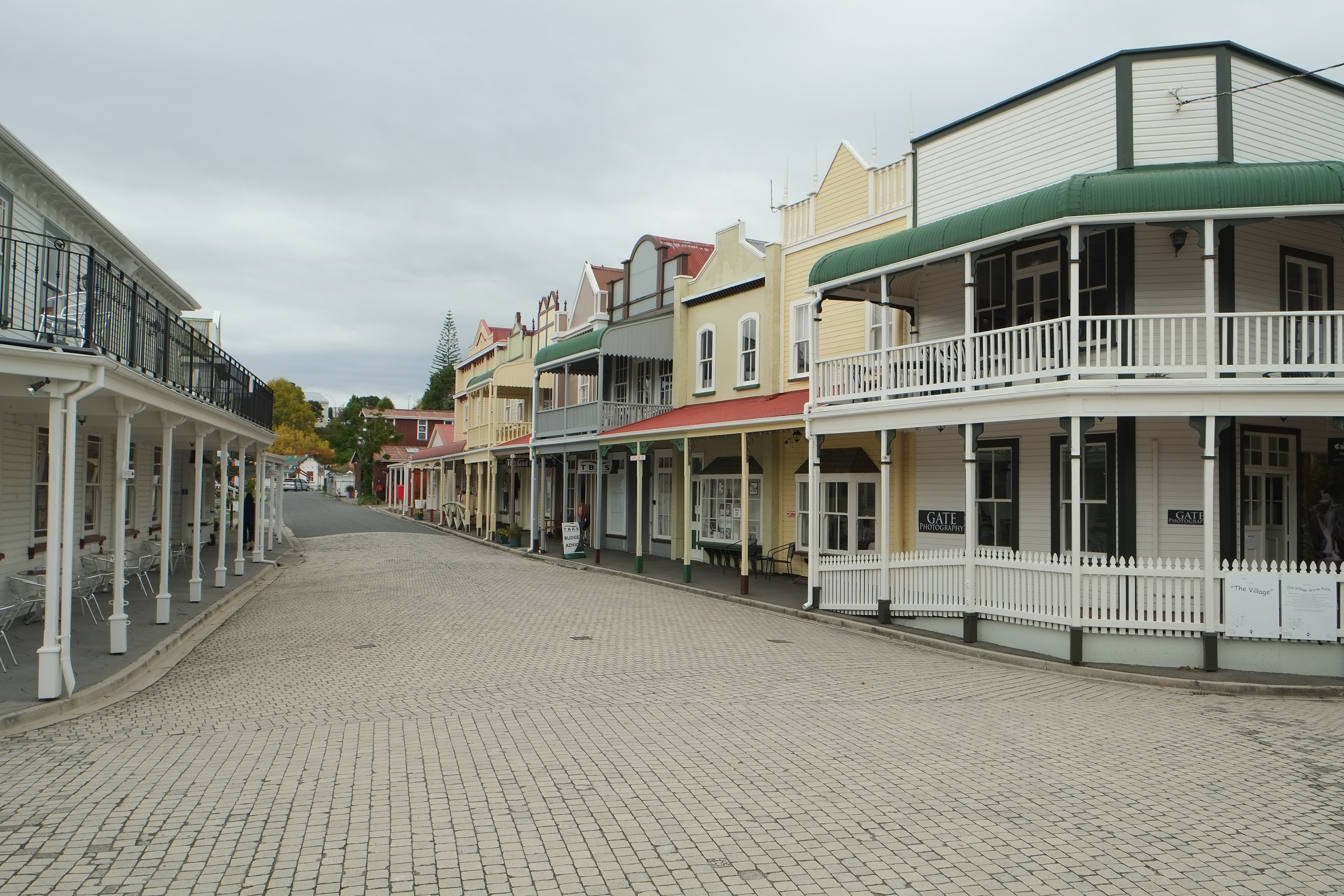
- Historic Village on 17th Avenue
- Interactive map of Tauranga South
- Coordinates: 37.706°S 176.155°E
- Country: New Zealand
- City: Tauranga
- Local authority: Tauranga City Council
- Electoral ward: Te Papa General Ward

Area
  - Land: 270 ha (670 acres)

Population (June 2025)
  - Total: 5,630
  - Density: 2,100/km^{2} (5,400/sq mi)

Judea	(Waikareao Estuary)	Tauranga Central
	Tauranga South	(Tauranga Harbour)
Gate Pa	(Waimapu Estuary)	Maungatapu

Tauranga South is a suburb of Tauranga, on New Zealand's North Island. It is located south-east of Judea, north-east of Gate Pa and south-west of Tauranga Central.

The suburb has a bowls club which hosts bowls players from across the country.

== Demographics ==
Tauranga South covers 2.70 km^{2} (1.04 sq mi) and had an estimated population of 5,630 as of June 2025, with a population density of 2,085 people per km^{2}.

Historical population
Year	Pop.	±% p.a.
2006	4,302	—
2013	4,656	+1.14%
2018	5,154	+2.05%
2023	5,373	+0.84%
The 2006 population is for a smaller area of 2.39 km^{2}. Source:

Tauranga South had a population of 5,373 in the 2023 New Zealand census, an increase of 219 people (4.2%) since the 2018 census, and an increase of 717 people (15.4%) since the 2013 census. There were 2,619 males, 2,745 females, and 12 people of other genders in 2,091 dwellings. 2.7% of people identified as LGBTIQ+. The median age was 41.6 years (compared with 38.1 years nationally). There were 831 people (15.5%) aged under 15 years, 978 (18.2%) aged 15 to 29, 2,436 (45.3%) aged 30 to 64, and 1,134 (21.1%) aged 65 or older.

People could identify as more than one ethnicity. The results were 68.3% European (Pākehā); 19.1% Māori; 3.2% Pasifika; 19.5% Asian; 1.5% Middle Eastern, Latin American and African New Zealanders (MELAA); and 2.1% other, which includes people giving their ethnicity as "New Zealander". English was spoken by 95.5%, Māori by 4.1%, Samoan by 0.3%, and other languages by 16.0%. No language could be spoken by 1.8% (e.g. too young to talk). New Zealand Sign Language was known by 0.5%. The percentage of people born overseas was 30.0, compared with 28.8% nationally.

Religious affiliations were 34.2% Christian, 2.9% Hindu, 1.7% Islam, 1.8% Māori religious beliefs, 0.8% Buddhist, 0.7% New Age, 0.1% Jewish, and 4.2% other religions. People who answered that they had no religion were 46.8%, and 7.1% of people did not answer the census question.

Of those at least 15 years old, 1,152 (25.4%) people had a bachelor's or higher degree, 2,196 (48.3%) had a post-high school certificate or diploma, and 1,200 (26.4%) people exclusively held high school qualifications. The median income was $39,200, compared with $41,500 nationally. 432 people (9.5%) earned over $100,000 compared to 12.1% nationally. The employment status of those at least 15 was 2,229 (49.1%) full-time, 612 (13.5%) part-time, and 123 (2.7%) unemployed.

Individual statistical areas
Name	Area (km^{2})	Population	Density (per km^{2})	Dwellings	Median age	Median income
Tauranga South	1.68	4,110	2,446	1,668	42.3 years	$41,700
Fraser Cove	1.02	1,269	1,244	426	40.1 years	$31,600
New Zealand					38.1 years	$41,500

== Economy ==
Fraser Cove shopping centre opened in Tauranga South in 2002. It covers 32,500 m² with 1235 carparks. The mall has 35 shops, including The Warehouse and a Woolworths supermarket.

== Education ==
Tauranga Intermediate is New Zealand's largest state intermediate school, with a roll of 1,217. It opened in 1958.

Tauranga Boys' College is a state secondary school for boys, with a roll of 2,288. It was established as Hillsdene School in 1945 and became Tauranga College in 1946. When Tauranga Girls' College was established as a separate school in 1958, Tauranga College was renamed Tauranga Boys'.

St Mary's Catholic School is a state-integrated Catholic school, with a roll of 465. It opened in 1942.

Tauranga Special School, Tauranga's only school for students with special learning needs, is also located in Tauranga South. It opened in 1965 as Kaka Street Special School, and adopted its current name in 2016.

All these schools except Tauranga Boys' are co-educational. Rolls are as of July 2026.
