= Fenton Park =

Suburb of Rotorua, New Zealand

- Suburb
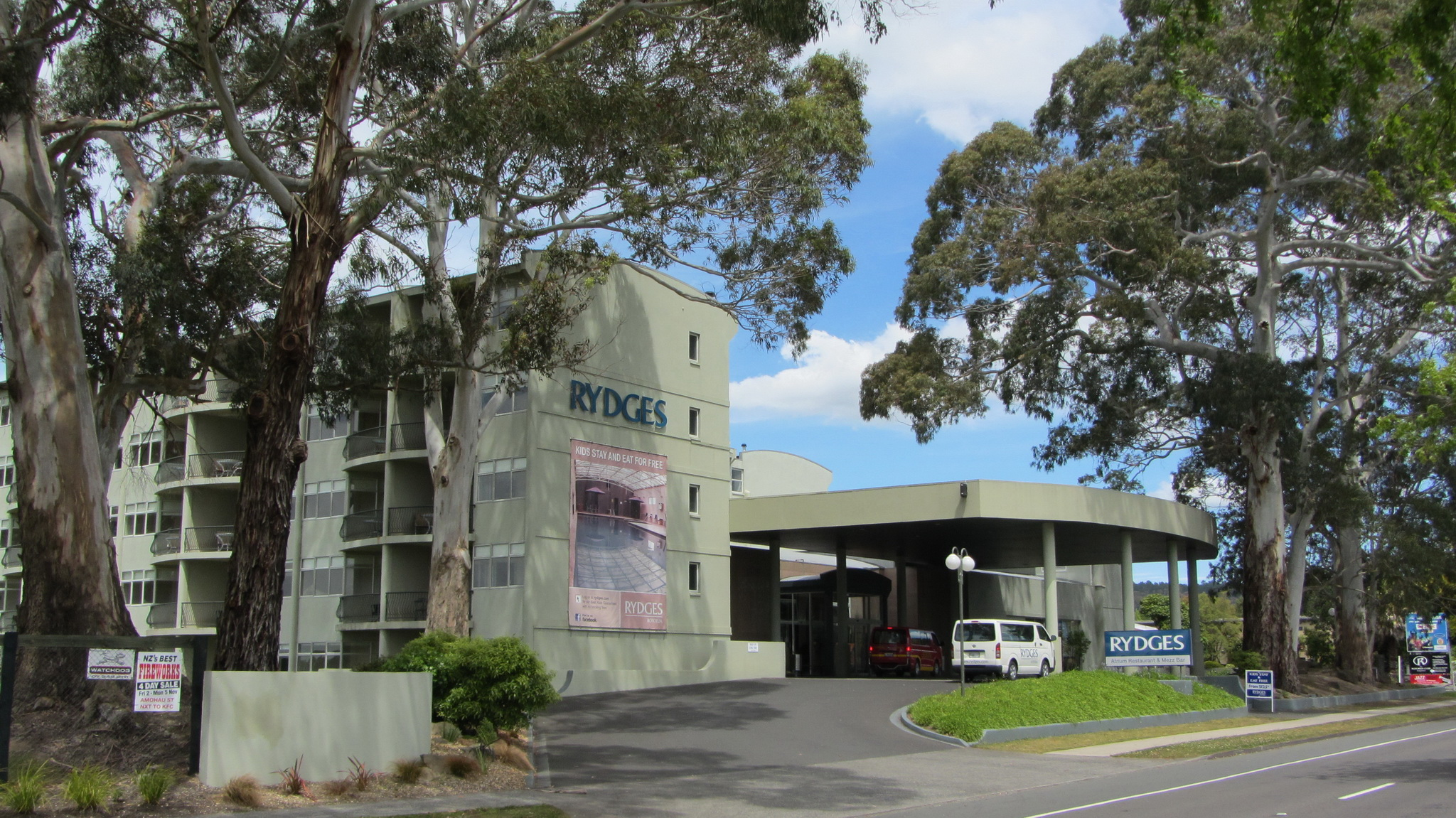
- Rydges Hotel on Fenton St
- Interactive map of Fenton Park
- Coordinates: 38.155°S 176.258°E
- Country: New Zealand
- City: Rotorua
- Local authority: Rotorua Lakes Council
- Electoral ward: Te Ipu Wai Auraki General Ward

Area
  - Land: 101 ha (250 acres)

Population (June 2025)
  - Total: 1,800
  - Density: 1,800/km^{2} (4,600/sq mi)

Victoria	Rotorua Central
Glenholme	Fenton Park	Lynmore
	Whakarewarewa

Fenton Park is an eastern suburb in Rotorua in the Bay of Plenty Region of New Zealand's North Island. Fenton Street contains Rotorua's main motel strip and is sometimes referred to as "Motel Mile".

State Highway 30 runs through the southern part of the suburb and SH 30A runs along the northeast boundary. Arawa Park racecourse is in the northern part. The Murray Linton Rose Garden, which opened in 1970, is a public park which was named after Murray Linton, a former mayor of Rotorua.

== Demographics ==
Fenton Park covers 1.01 km^{2} (0.39 sq mi) and had an estimated population of 1,800 as of June 2025, with a population density of 1,782 people per km^{2}.

Historical population
Year	Pop.	±% p.a.
2006	1,395	—
2013	1,452	+0.57%
2018	1,698	+3.18%
2023	1,704	+0.07%

Fenton Park had a population of 1,704 in the 2023 New Zealand census, an increase of 6 people (0.4%) since the 2018 census, and an increase of 252 people (17.4%) since the 2013 census. There were 765 males, 933 females, and 3 people of other genders in 753 dwellings. 2.6% of people identified as LGBTIQ+. The median age was 39.8 years (compared with 38.1 years nationally). There were 294 people (17.3%) aged under 15 years, 297 (17.4%) aged 15 to 29, 678 (39.8%) aged 30 to 64, and 432 (25.4%) aged 65 or older.

People could identify as more than one ethnicity. The results were 44.5% European (Pākehā); 43.3% Māori; 7.4% Pasifika; 19.7% Asian; 0.2% Middle Eastern, Latin American and African New Zealanders (MELAA); and 0.9% other, which includes people giving their ethnicity as "New Zealander". English was spoken by 94.7%, Māori by 15.1%, Samoan by 0.5%, and other languages by 13.7%. No language could be spoken by 2.1% (e.g. too young to talk). New Zealand Sign Language was known by 0.7%. The percentage of people born overseas was 26.2, compared with 28.8% nationally.

Religious affiliations were 37.9% Christian, 4.4% Hindu, 0.4% Islam, 4.8% Māori religious beliefs, 0.5% Buddhist, 0.2% New Age, and 6.0% other religions. People who answered that they had no religion were 38.0%, and 8.1% of people did not answer the census question.

Of those at least 15 years old, 246 (17.4%) people had a bachelor's or higher degree, 693 (49.1%) had a post-high school certificate or diploma, and 474 (33.6%) people exclusively held high school qualifications. The median income was $33,800, compared with $41,500 nationally. 42 people (3.0%) earned over $100,000 compared to 12.1% nationally. The employment status of those at least 15 was 639 (45.3%) full-time, 129 (9.1%) part-time, and 66 (4.7%) unemployed.
