= Ngapuna =

Suburb of Rotorua, New Zealand

- Suburb
- Interactive map of Ngapuna
- Coordinates: 38.146707°S 176.274828°E
- Country: New Zealand
- City: Rotorua
- Local authority: Rotorua Lakes Council
- Electoral ward: Te Ipu Wai Auraki General Ward

Area
  - Land: 349 ha (860 acres)

Population (June 2025)
  - Total: 380
  - Density: 110/km^{2} (280/sq mi)

Rotorua Central	(Lake Rotorua)	Ōwhata
Fenton Park	Ngapuna	Lynmore
Whakarewarewa

Ngapuna (Māori: Ngāpuna) is a suburb in eastern Rotorua in the Bay of Plenty Region of New Zealand's North Island.

The New Zealand Ministry for Culture and Heritage gives a translation of "the springs" for Ngāpuna.

The Rotorua Wastewater Treatment Plant is in Ngapuna.

== Marae ==
The suburb has two marae:

- Ngāpuna or Hurunga o te Rangi Marae and meeting house is a meeting place for the Ngāti Whakaue hapū of Ngāti Hurunga Te Rangi and Ngāti Taeotu, and the Tūhourangi hapū of Hurunga Te Rangi and Ngāti Kahu Upoko.
- Hinemihi Marae and meeting house is a meeting place for the Tūhourangi hapū of Ngāti Hinemihi and Ngāti Tuohonoa), and the Ngāti Tarāwhai hapū of Ngāti Hinemihi. In October 2020, the Government committed $4,525,104 from the Provincial Growth Fund to upgrade the marae and nine other marae, creating an estimated 34 jobs.

== Demographics ==
Ngapuna covers 3.49 km^{2} (1.35 sq mi) and had an estimated population of 380 as of June 2025, with a population density of 109 people per km^{2}.

Historical population
Year	Pop.	±% p.a.
2006	327	—
2013	285	−1.94%
2018	357	+4.61%
2023	348	−0.51%

Ngapuna had a population of 348 in the 2023 New Zealand census, a decrease of 9 people (−2.5%) since the 2018 census, and an increase of 63 people (22.1%) since the 2013 census. There were 189 males and 165 females in 105 dwellings. 1.7% of people identified as LGBTIQ+. The median age was 35.3 years (compared with 38.1 years nationally). There were 81 people (23.3%) aged under 15 years, 66 (19.0%) aged 15 to 29, 147 (42.2%) aged 30 to 64, and 54 (15.5%) aged 65 or older.

People could identify as more than one ethnicity. The results were 20.7% European (Pākehā), 94.0% Māori, 5.2% Pasifika, 2.6% Asian, and 1.7% other, which includes people giving their ethnicity as "New Zealander". English was spoken by 97.4%, Māori by 35.3%, and other languages by 1.7%. No language could be spoken by 0.9% (e.g. too young to talk). The percentage of people born overseas was 1.7, compared with 28.8% nationally.

Religious affiliations were 38.8% Christian, 6.9% Māori religious beliefs, and 0.9% other religions. People who answered that they had no religion were 44.8%, and 7.8% of people did not answer the census question.

Of those at least 15 years old, 15 (5.6%) people had a bachelor's or higher degree, 168 (62.9%) had a post-high school certificate or diploma, and 78 (29.2%) people exclusively held high school qualifications. The median income was $32,300, compared with $41,500 nationally. 6 people (2.2%) earned over $100,000 compared to 12.1% nationally. The employment status of those at least 15 was 108 (40.4%) full-time, 33 (12.4%) part-time, and 24 (9.0%) unemployed.
