= Omanu =

Suburb of Tauranga, New Zealand

- Suburb
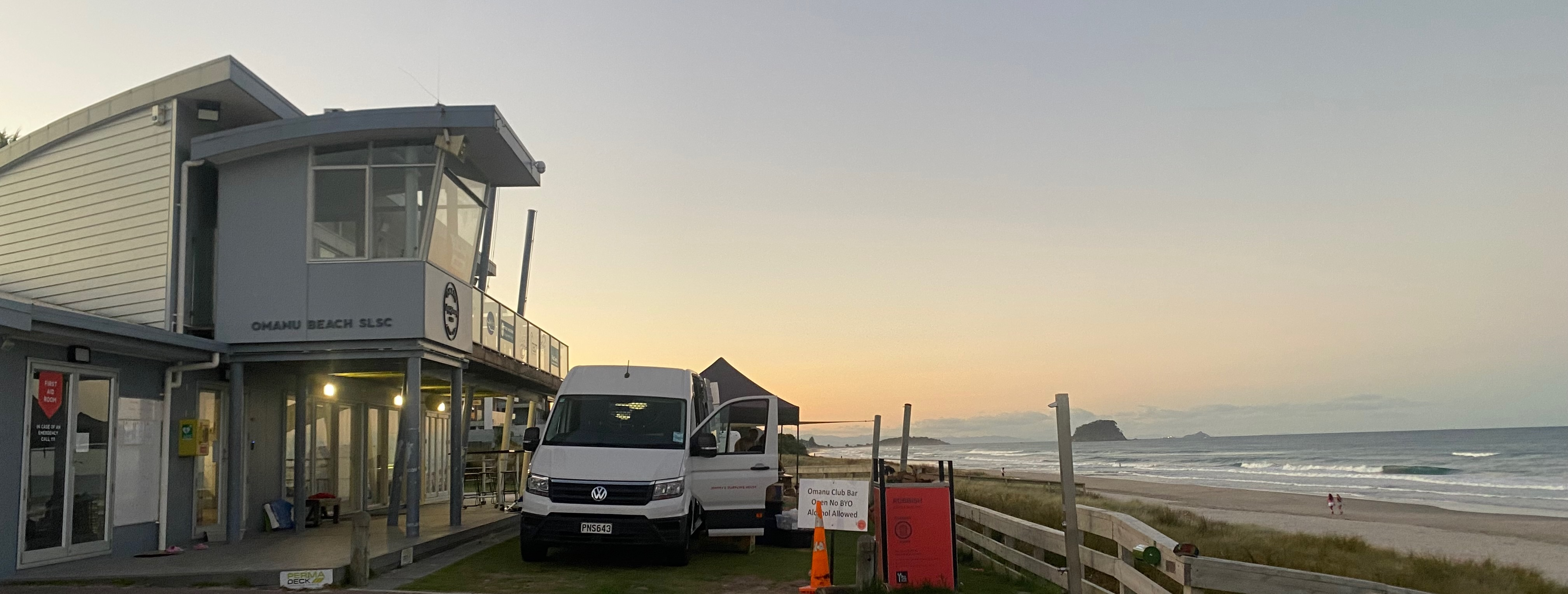
- Omanu Surf Lifesaving Club building and beach
- Interactive map of Omanu
- Coordinates: 37.659757°S 176.214844°E
- Country: New Zealand
- City: Tauranga
- Local authority: Tauranga City Council
- Electoral ward: Mauao/Mount Maunganui General Ward

Area
  - Land: 102 ha (250 acres)

Population (June 2025)
  - Total: 3,020
  - Density: 2,960/km^{2} (7,670/sq mi)

Mount Maunganui		(Bay of Plenty)
	Omanu
	Matapihi	Arataki

Omanu is a beach and suburb in Tauranga, in the Bay of Plenty Region of New Zealand's North Island.

The long, sandy beach is accessible via several public walkways through the dunes. It is a popular place to swim, surf and walk, and hosts surf lifesaving competitions. Tauranga City Council monitors erosion at the beach regularly and replenishes sand every year.

A surf lifesaving club was established at Omanu in 1947 to patrol the beach. The club also patrolled Papamoa Beach until a new club was established there in 1990. It is now the largest surf club in Bay of Plenty, and has the largest children's nippers programme in New Zealand. A new club house was completed in June 2006.

Between July 2014 and December 2015, Omanu recorded the most burglaries of any suburb in Tauranga. Police say many of the thieves are opportunists.

== Demographics ==
Omanu Beach covers 1.02 km^{2} (0.39 sq mi) and had an estimated population of 3,020 as of June 2025, with a population density of 2,961 people per km^{2}. Omanu Beach is considered a component part of Mount Maunganui by Stats NZ.

Historical population
Year	Pop.	±% p.a.
2006	2,574	—
2013	2,619	+0.25%
2018	2,919	+2.19%
2023	2,982	+0.43%

Omanu Beach had a population of 2,982 in the 2023 New Zealand census, an increase of 63 people (2.2%) since the 2018 census, and an increase of 363 people (13.9%) since the 2013 census. There were 1,407 males, 1,566 females, and 9 people of other genders in 1,107 dwellings. 2.3% of people identified as LGBTIQ+. The median age was 38.6 years (compared with 38.1 years nationally). There were 639 people (21.4%) aged under 15 years, 492 (16.5%) aged 15 to 29, 1,329 (44.6%) aged 30 to 64, and 519 (17.4%) aged 65 or older.

People could identify as more than one ethnicity. The results were 90.6% European (Pākehā); 13.3% Māori; 2.3% Pasifika; 3.0% Asian; 3.6% Middle Eastern, Latin American and African New Zealanders (MELAA); and 0.9% other, which includes people giving their ethnicity as "New Zealander". English was spoken by 97.1%, Māori by 1.7%, Samoan by 0.1%, and other languages by 8.1%. No language could be spoken by 2.0% (e.g. too young to talk). New Zealand Sign Language was known by 0.2%. 20.0% of people were born overseas, compared with 28.8% nationally.

Religious affiliations were 25.7% Christian, 0.1% Hindu, 0.4% Māori religious beliefs, 0.3% Buddhist, 0.4% New Age, 0.2% Jewish, and 0.9% other religions. People who answered that they had no religion were 66.0%, and 5.9% of people did not answer the census question.

Of those at least 15 years old, 780 (33.3%) people had a bachelor's or higher degree, 1,122 (47.9%) had a post-high school certificate or diploma, and 441 (18.8%) people exclusively held high school qualifications. The median income was $47,800, compared with $41,500 nationally. 393 people (16.8%) earned over $100,000 compared to 12.1% nationally. The employment status of those at least 15 was 1,194 (51.0%) full-time, 408 (17.4%) part-time, and 54 (2.3%) unemployed.

== Education ==
Omanu School is a co-educational state primary school for Year 1 to 6 students, with a roll of 543 as of July 2026. The school opened in 1955.

Mount Maunganui College is a co-educational state secondary school for Year 9 to 13 students, established in 1957, with a roll of 1,756.
