= Victoria, Rotorua =

Suburb of Rotorua, New Zealand

Victoria
- Suburb
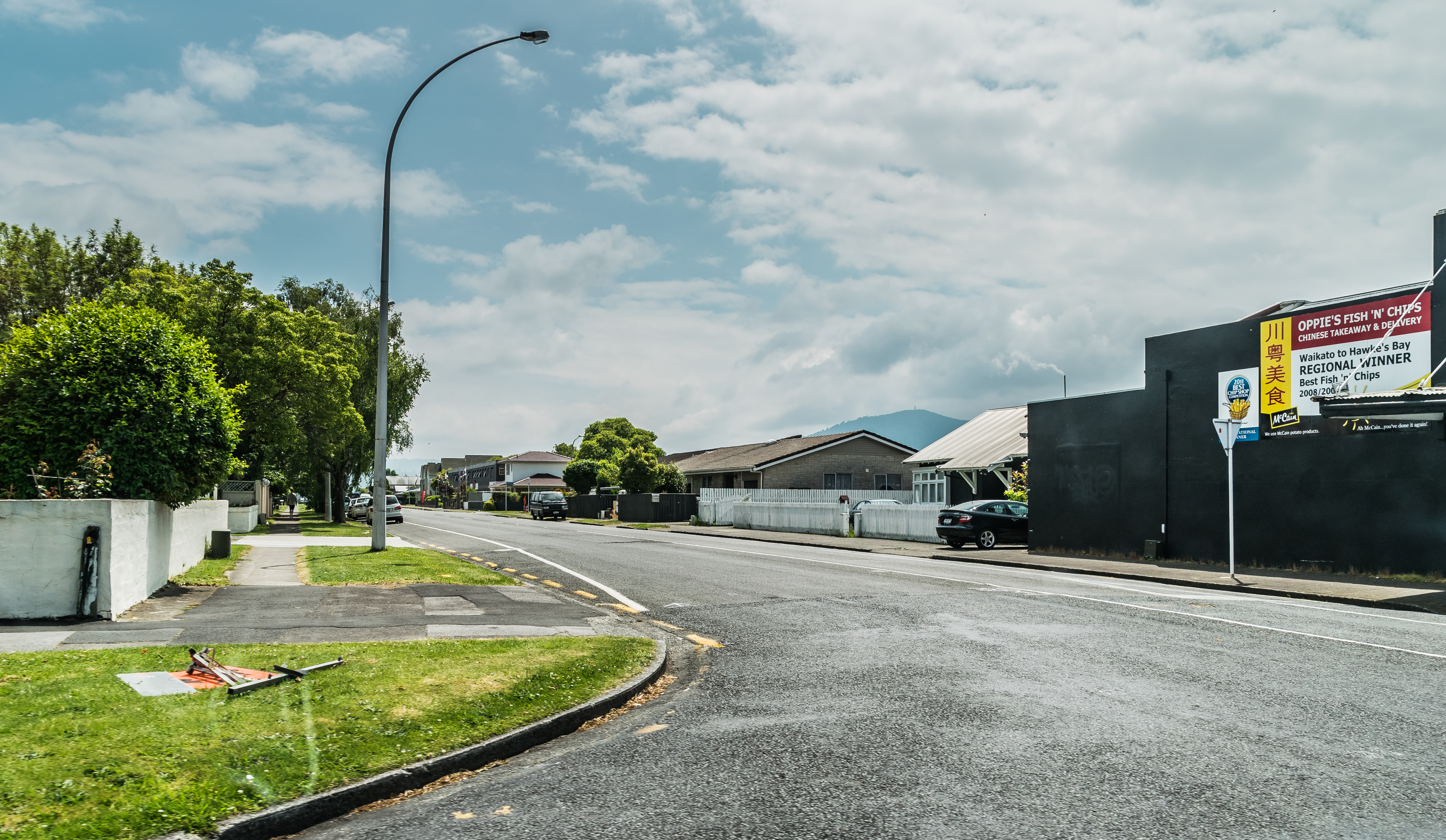
- Malfroy Road near its intersection with Fenton Street
- Interactive map of Victoria
- Coordinates: 38.144578°S 176.247071°E
- Country: New Zealand
- City: Rotorua
- Local authority: Rotorua Lakes Council
- Electoral ward: Te Ipu Wai Auraki General Ward

Area
  - Land: 52 ha (130 acres)

Population (June 2025)
  - Total: 2,290
  - Density: 4,400/km^{2} (11,000/sq mi)

	Ohinemutu	Rotorua Central
Utuhina	Victoria	Ngapuna
Hillcrest	Glenholme	Fenton Park

Victoria is a suburb of Rotorua in the Bay of Plenty Region of New Zealand's North Island.

== Demographics ==
Victoria covers 0.52 km^{2} (0.20 sq mi) and had an estimated population of 2,290 as of June 2025, with a population density of 4,404 people per km^{2}.

Historical population
Year	Pop.	±% p.a.
2006	1,638	—
2013	1,752	+0.97%
2018	2,094	+3.63%
2023	2,103	+0.09%

Victoria had a population of 2,103 in the 2023 New Zealand census, an increase of 9 people (0.4%) since the 2018 census, and an increase of 351 people (20.0%) since the 2013 census. There were 1,008 males, 1,086 females, and 6 people of other genders in 939 dwellings. 4.0% of people identified as LGBTIQ+. The median age was 34.1 years (compared with 38.1 years nationally). There were 375 people (17.8%) aged under 15 years, 492 (23.4%) aged 15 to 29, 939 (44.7%) aged 30 to 64, and 294 (14.0%) aged 65 or older.

People could identify as more than one ethnicity. The results were 38.8% European (Pākehā); 41.2% Māori; 7.8% Pasifika; 28.2% Asian; 1.1% Middle Eastern, Latin American and African New Zealanders (MELAA); and 2.0% other, which includes people giving their ethnicity as "New Zealander". English was spoken by 93.4%, Māori by 14.6%, Samoan by 0.9%, and other languages by 19.7%. No language could be spoken by 3.1% (e.g. too young to talk). New Zealand Sign Language was known by 0.9%. The percentage of people born overseas was 33.8, compared with 28.8% nationally.

Religious affiliations were 33.8% Christian, 8.0% Hindu, 1.1% Islam, 5.8% Māori religious beliefs, 1.4% Buddhist, 0.6% New Age, 0.3% Jewish, and 5.0% other religions. People who answered that they had no religion were 38.7%, and 6.1% of people did not answer the census question.

Of those at least 15 years old, 387 (22.4%) people had a bachelor's or higher degree, 807 (46.7%) had a post-high school certificate or diploma, and 528 (30.6%) people exclusively held high school qualifications. The median income was $34,300, compared with $41,500 nationally. 69 people (4.0%) earned over $100,000 compared to 12.1% nationally. The employment status of those at least 15 was 846 (49.0%) full-time, 183 (10.6%) part-time, and 108 (6.2%) unemployed.

== Education ==
Rotorua Intermediate is a co-educational state intermediate school, with a roll of 640 as of July 2025. The school formed at the end of 1956, previously being part of Rotorua District High School.

== Notable locations ==
- Robertson House, 70 Pererika Street, 1905 bay villa, family home of Edwin Robertson, who was one of the largest private employers in Rotorua at the time.
