= Waikite Valley =

Coordinates: 38.338780°S 176.271014°E

Waikite Hot Pool

Waikite Valley is a rural community in Rotorua Lakes within the Waikato region of New Zealand's North Island.

== Education ==
Waikite Valley School is a co-educational state primary school for Year 1 to 8 students, with a roll of 81 as of July 2026.
