= Ōwhata =

Suburb of Rotorua, New Zealand

- Suburb
- Interactive map of Ōwhata
- Coordinates: 38.134°S 176.296°E
- Country: New Zealand
- City: Rotorua
- Local authority: Rotorua Lakes Council
- Electoral ward: Te Ipu Wai Auraki General Ward

Area
  - Land: 584 ha (1,440 acres)

Population (June 2025)
  - Total: 6,930
  - Density: 1,190/km^{2} (3,070/sq mi)

(Lake Rotorua)		Holdens Bay
(Ōwhatiura Bay)	Ōwhata
Ngāpuna	Lynmore

Ōwhata is a semi-rural suburb of Rotorua in the Bay of Plenty region of New Zealand's North Island.

In 2015, it had the highest house sales of any suburb in Rotorua.

The New Zealand Ministry for Culture and Heritage gives a translation of "place of the elevated stage" for Ōwhata.

== Marae ==
The local Ōwhata or Hinemoa Marae and is a meeting place for the Ngāti Whakaue hapū of Ngāti Korouateka and Ngāti te Roro o te Rangi. It includes the Tūtanekai meeting house.

In October 2020, the Government committed $4,525,104 from the Provincial Growth Fund to upgrade the marae and nine others, creating an estimated 34 jobs.

== Demographics ==
Ōwhata covers 5.84 km^{2} (2.25 sq mi) and had an estimated population of 6,930 as of June 2025, with a population density of 1,187 people per km^{2}.

Historical population
Year	Pop.	±% p.a.
2006	5,439	—
2013	5,493	+0.14%
2018	6,216	+2.50%
2023	6,468	+0.80%
The 2006 population is for a smaller area of 4.75 km^{2}. Source:

Ōwhata had a population of 6,468 in the 2023 New Zealand census, an increase of 252 people (4.1%) since the 2018 census, and an increase of 975 people (17.7%) since the 2013 census. There were 3,180 males, 3,261 females, and 27 people of other genders in 2,145 dwellings. 2.4% of people identified as LGBTIQ+. The median age was 34.3 years (compared with 38.1 years nationally). There were 1,605 people (24.8%) aged under 15 years, 1,248 (19.3%) aged 15 to 29, 2,547 (39.4%) aged 30 to 64, and 1,068 (16.5%) aged 65 or older.

People could identify as more than one ethnicity. The results were 60.5% European (Pākehā); 48.0% Māori; 5.9% Pasifika; 9.3% Asian; 0.8% Middle Eastern, Latin American and African New Zealanders (MELAA); and 2.2% other, which includes people giving their ethnicity as "New Zealander". English was spoken by 96.1%, Māori by 16.1%, Samoan by 0.3%, and other languages by 9.1%. No language could be spoken by 2.0% (e.g. too young to talk). New Zealand Sign Language was known by 0.4%. The percentage of people born overseas was 16.4, compared with 28.8% nationally.

Religious affiliations were 29.1% Christian, 1.9% Hindu, 0.3% Islam, 4.6% Māori religious beliefs, 0.5% Buddhist, 0.3% New Age, and 1.9% other religions. People who answered that they had no religion were 54.8%, and 7.1% of people did not answer the census question.

Of those at least 15 years old, 870 (17.9%) people had a bachelor's or higher degree, 2,724 (56.0%) had a post-high school certificate or diploma, and 1,272 (26.2%) people exclusively held high school qualifications. The median income was $39,400, compared with $41,500 nationally. 360 people (7.4%) earned over $100,000 compared to 12.1% nationally. The employment status of those at least 15 was 2,400 (49.4%) full-time, 654 (13.4%) part-time, and 198 (4.1%) unemployed.

Individual statistical areas
Name	Area (km^{2})	Population	Density (per km^{2})	Dwellings	Median age	Median income
Ōwhata West	3.33	3,231	970	1,062	32.5 years	$40,500
Ōwhata East	2.51	3,240	1,291	1,086	36.1 years	$38,200
New Zealand					38.1 years	$41,500

== Education ==
Ōwhata School, or Ōwata te Kura, is a primary school for year 1–6 students with a roll of 228. It opened in 1966.

Mokoia Intermediate is a state intermediate school, with a roll of 332. It offers education in complete or partial Māori language immersion, as well as in English.

Rotorua Lakes High School is a state secondary school, with a roll of 630. It opened in 1971.

All these schools are co-educational. Rolls are as of July 2026.
