= Mihi, New Zealand =

Community in Rotorua Lakes, New Zealand

Coordinates: 38.485896°S 176.282171°E

Mihi is a rural community in Rotorua Lakes within the Waikato region of New Zealand's North Island. It is located on the northern banks of the Waikato River, near the mouth of the Waiotapu Stream, and just off State Highway 5.

== Education ==
Mihi School is a co-educational state primary school for Year 1 to 6 students, with a roll of 17 as of November 2024.
