= Holdens Bay =

Suburb of Rotorua, New Zealand

- Suburb
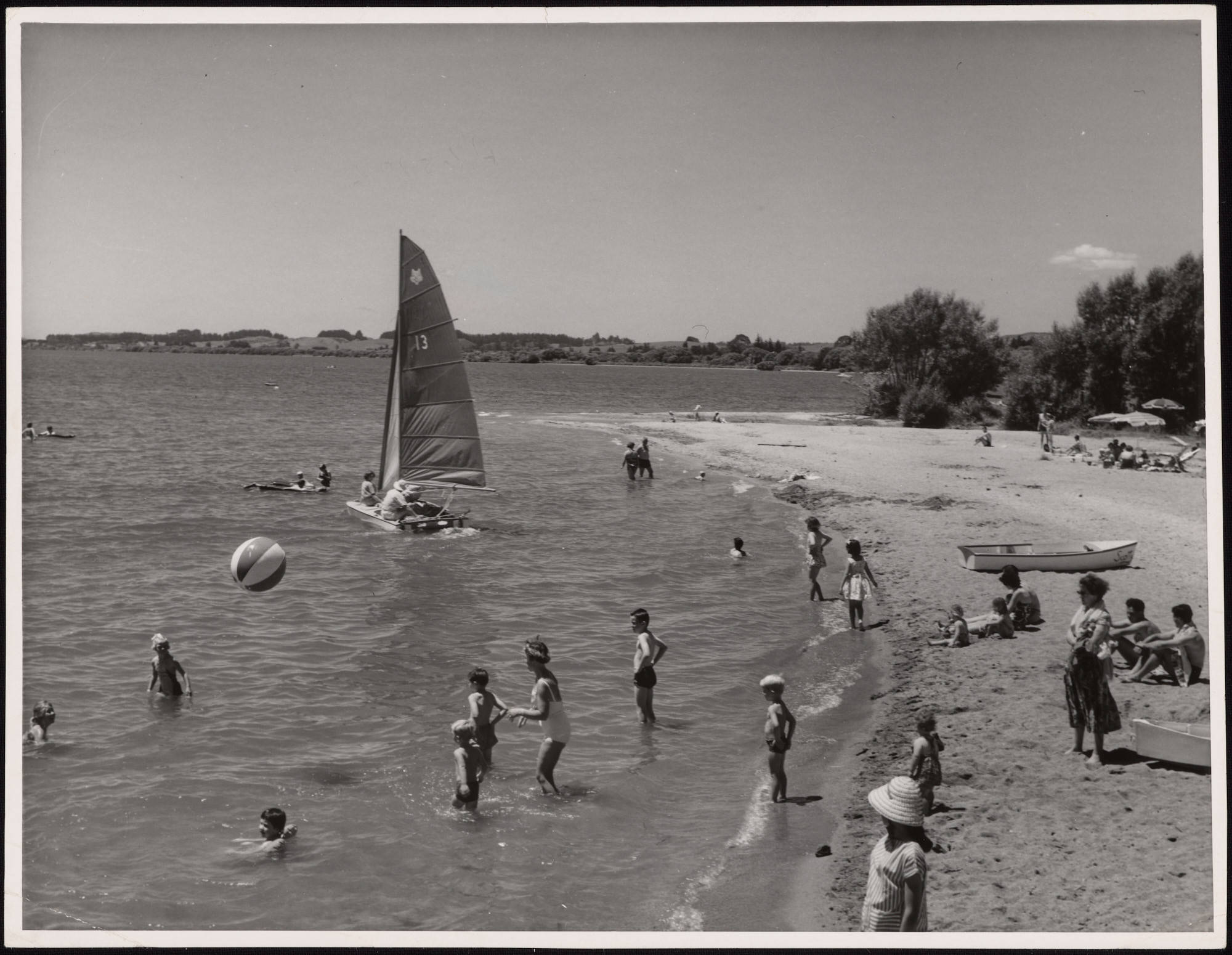
- Holidaymakers at Waingaehe / Holdens Bay in 1961
- Interactive map of Holdens Bay
- Coordinates: 38.119°S 176.302°E
- Country: New Zealand
- City: Rotorua
- Local authority: Rotorua Lakes Council
- Electoral ward: Te Ipu Wai Auraki General Ward

Area
  - Land: 46 ha (110 acres)

Population (2023 Census)
  - Total: 609
  - Density: 1,300/km^{2} (3,400/sq mi)
- Airports: Rotorua Regional Airport

(Lake Rotorua)		Hannahs Bay; Tikitere
	Holdens Bay
Ōwhata

Holdens Bay is an eastern suburb of Rotorua in the Bay of Plenty region of New Zealand's North Island.

== Demographics ==
Holdens Bay covers 0.46 km^{2} (0.18 sq mi). It is part of the Holdens Bay-Rotokawa statistical area.

Historical population for Holdens Bay
Year	Pop.	±% p.a.
2006	498	—
2013	522	+0.67%
2018	534	+0.46%
2023	609	+2.66%

Holdens Bay had a population of 609 in the 2023 New Zealand census, an increase of 75 people (14.0%) since the 2018 census, and an increase of 87 people (16.7%) since the 2013 census. There were 315 males, 297 females, and 3 people of other genders in 240 dwellings. 3.4% of people identified as LGBTIQ+. There were 135 people (22.2%) aged under 15 years, 141 (23.2%) aged 15 to 29, 255 (41.9%) aged 30 to 64, and 84 (13.8%) aged 65 or older.

People could identify as more than one ethnicity. The results were 74.4% European (Pākehā), 41.4% Māori, 10.8% Pasifika, 5.9% Asian, and 2.5% other, which includes people giving their ethnicity as "New Zealander". English was spoken by 97.0%, Māori by 12.8%, Samoan by 0.5%, and other languages by 7.4%. No language could be spoken by 2.0% (e.g. too young to talk). New Zealand Sign Language was known by 1.0%. The percentage of people born overseas was 17.2, compared with 28.8% nationally.

Religious affiliations were 31.5% Christian, 0.5% Islam, 3.0% Māori religious beliefs, 1.0% New Age, and 1.0% other religions. People who answered that they had no religion were 56.2%, and 7.4% of people did not answer the census question.

Of those at least 15 years old, 75 (15.8%) people had a bachelor's or higher degree, 297 (62.7%) had a post-high school certificate or diploma, and 114 (24.1%) people exclusively held high school qualifications. 36 people (7.6%) earned over $100,000 compared to 12.1% nationally. The employment status of those at least 15 was 249 (52.5%) full-time, 60 (12.7%) part-time, and 24 (5.1%) unemployed.

=== Holdens Bay-Rotokawa statistical area ===
The statistical area of Holdens Bay-Rotokawa, which also includes Hannahs Bay, covers 5.50 km^{2} (2.12 sq mi) and had an estimated population of 1,420 as of June 2025, with a population density of 258 people per km^{2}.

Historical population for Holdens Bay-Rotokawa
Year	Pop.	±% p.a.
2006	1,257	—
2013	1,140	−1.39%
2018	1,227	+1.48%
2023	1,332	+1.66%
The 2006 population is for a larger area of 8.79 km^{2}. Source:

Holdens Bay-Rotokawa had a population of 1,332 in the 2023 New Zealand census, an increase of 105 people (8.6%) since the 2018 census, and an increase of 192 people (16.8%) since the 2013 census. There were 648 males, 681 females, and 6 people of other genders in 492 dwellings. 2.9% of people identified as LGBTIQ+. The median age was 35.8 years (compared with 38.1 years nationally). There were 291 people (21.8%) aged under 15 years, 273 (20.5%) aged 15 to 29, 585 (43.9%) aged 30 to 64, and 186 (14.0%) aged 65 or older.

People could identify as more than one ethnicity. The results were 68.0% European (Pākehā); 46.4% Māori; 7.9% Pasifika; 5.2% Asian; 0.5% Middle Eastern, Latin American and African New Zealanders (MELAA); and 3.6% other, which includes people giving their ethnicity as "New Zealander". English was spoken by 96.4%, Māori by 14.4%, Samoan by 0.2%, and other languages by 6.8%. No language could be spoken by 1.8% (e.g. too young to talk). New Zealand Sign Language was known by 0.5%. The percentage of people born overseas was 16.2, compared with 28.8% nationally.

Religious affiliations were 30.9% Christian, 1.1% Hindu, 0.2% Islam, 3.4% Māori religious beliefs, 0.2% Buddhist, 0.9% New Age, 0.2% Jewish, and 1.1% other religions. People who answered that they had no religion were 54.5%, and 7.4% of people did not answer the census question.

Of those at least 15 years old, 186 (17.9%) people had a bachelor's or higher degree, 615 (59.1%) had a post-high school certificate or diploma, and 246 (23.6%) people exclusively held high school qualifications. The median income was $39,600, compared with $41,500 nationally. 78 people (7.5%) earned over $100,000 compared to 12.1% nationally. The employment status of those at least 15 was 540 (51.9%) full-time, 147 (14.1%) part-time, and 36 (3.5%) unemployed.

== Education ==
Rotokawa School is a coeducational primary school for year 1–6 students with a roll of 157 as of July 2025. The school opened in 1956. Rotokawa Maori School, opened 1926, was a predecessor.
