= McLaren Falls =

Settlement in Bay of Plenty, New Zealand

Coordinates: 37.800122°S 176.040148°E

McLaren Falls is a settlement in the Western Bay of Plenty District and Bay of Plenty Region of New Zealand's North Island.
