= Tauranga Special School =

Location
- 39 Eighteenth Avenue, Tauranga, New Zealand; 37.7117°S 176.1564°E

Information
- Type: State, Co-educational, Special
- Established: 1965
- Ministry of Education Institution no.: 1762
- Principal: Barrie Wickens
- Enrolment: 129 (July 2026)
- Socio-economic decile: 4
- Website: taurangaspecialschool.nz

Tauranga Special School is a school for children with mild-severe learning and physical disabilities located in Tauranga, New Zealand. It is the only school of its kind in the Western Bay of Plenty region, and operates three satellite classes in Tauranga Intermediate school, Merivale Primary School and Te Puke Primary School. The current principal is Barrie Wickens.
