= Rotorua Central =

Central business district of Rotorua, New Zealand

- Suburb
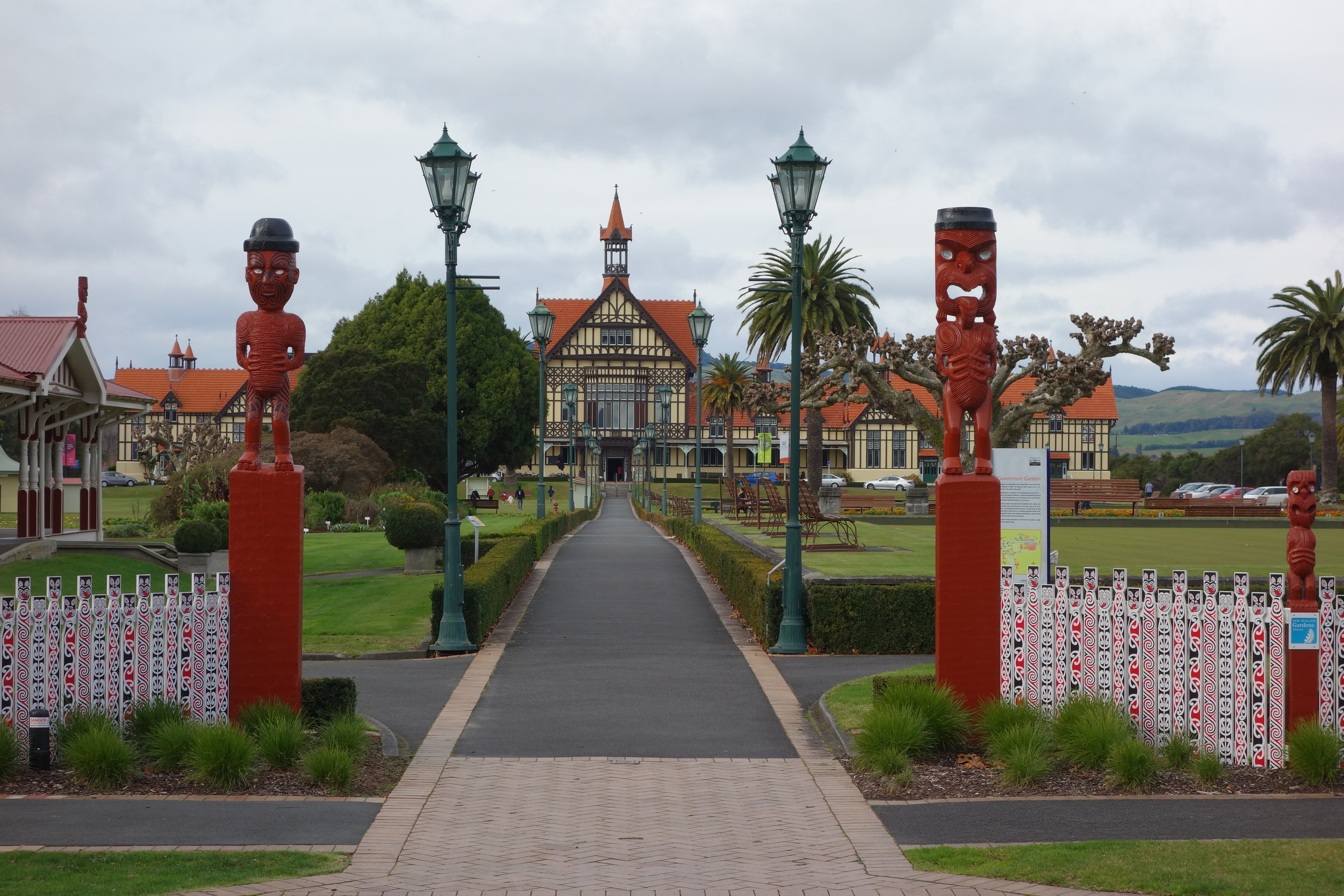
- Government Gardens
- Interactive map of Rotorua Central
- Coordinates: 38.134868°S 176.253827°E
- Country: New Zealand
- City: Rotorua
- Local authority: Rotorua Lakes Council
- Electoral ward: Te Ipu Wai Auraki General Ward

Area
  - Land: 177 ha (440 acres)

Population (June 2025)
  - Total: 540
  - Density: 310/km^{2} (790/sq mi)

Ohinemutu	(Lake Rotorua)
Ohinemutu	Rotorua Central	(Ōwhatiura Bay)
Victoria	Fenton Park	Ngapuna

Rotorua Central is the central business district and central suburb of Rotorua, in the Bay of Plenty region of New Zealand's North Island.

== Demographics ==
Rotorua Central covers 1.77 km^{2} (0.68 sq mi) and had an estimated population of 540 as of June 2025, with a population density of 305 people per km^{2}.

Historical population
Year	Pop.	±% p.a.
2006	471	—
2013	528	+1.65%
2018	537	+0.34%
2023	513	−0.91%

Rotorua Central had a population of 513 in the 2023 New Zealand census, a decrease of 24 people (−4.5%) since the 2018 census, and a decrease of 15 people (−2.8%) since the 2013 census. There were 279 males, 231 females, and 3 people of other genders in 240 dwellings. 4.7% of people identified as LGBTIQ+. The median age was 41.2 years (compared with 38.1 years nationally). There were 33 people (6.4%) aged under 15 years, 114 (22.2%) aged 15 to 29, 297 (57.9%) aged 30 to 64, and 69 (13.5%) aged 65 or older.

People could identify as more than one ethnicity. The results were 46.2% European (Pākehā); 40.9% Māori; 3.5% Pasifika; 23.4% Asian; 1.8% Middle Eastern, Latin American and African New Zealanders (MELAA); and 1.2% other, which includes people giving their ethnicity as "New Zealander". English was spoken by 93.0%, Māori by 15.2%, Samoan by 0.6%, and other languages by 20.5%. No language could be spoken by 1.8% (e.g. too young to talk). New Zealand Sign Language was known by 1.2%. The percentage of people born overseas was 33.3, compared with 28.8% nationally.

Religious affiliations were 29.8% Christian, 5.8% Hindu, 1.8% Islam, 4.1% Māori religious beliefs, 2.9% Buddhist, and 1.8% other religions. People who answered that they had no religion were 47.4%, and 6.4% of people did not answer the census question.

Of those at least 15 years old, 96 (20.0%) people had a bachelor's or higher degree, 219 (45.6%) had a post-high school certificate or diploma, and 162 (33.8%) people exclusively held high school qualifications. The median income was $33,600, compared with $41,500 nationally. 36 people (7.5%) earned over $100,000 compared to 12.1% nationally. The employment status of those at least 15 was 228 (47.5%) full-time, 60 (12.5%) part-time, and 51 (10.6%) unemployed.

== Economy ==
=== Retail ===
The Rotorua Central mall opened in August 1995. It has 55 tenants, including The Warehouse, Harvey Norman, Countdown, Farmers, Briscoes, Rebel Sport and Smiths City.

== Education ==
Rotorua Primary School is a co-educational Year 1 to 8 school, with a roll of 385 (as of July 2026). It started in 1886 as Rotorua Public School, and students from a native school established in 1868 joined them over the next couple of years. In 1887 it moved to the current site. It added a Secondary Department in 1914 to become Rotorua District High School. The Secondary Department moved to a succession of new sites in the 1920s.
