= Utuhina =

Suburb of Rotorua, New Zealand

- Suburb
- Interactive map of Utuhina
- Coordinates: 38.143591°S 176.230936°E
- Country: New Zealand
- City: Rotorua
- Local authority: Rotorua Lakes Council
- Electoral ward: Te Ipu Wai Auraki General Ward

Area
  - Land: 67 ha (170 acres)

Population (June 2025)
  - Total: 1,640
  - Density: 2,400/km^{2} (6,300/sq mi)

Fordlands	Mangakakahi	Ohinemutu
Fordlands	Utuhina	Victoria
Hillcrest	Hillcrest	Glenholme

Utuhina is a suburb of Rotorua in the Bay of Plenty Region of New Zealand's North Island.

== Demographics ==
Utuhina covers 0.67 km^{2} (0.26 sq mi) and had an estimated population of 1,640 as of June 2025, with a population density of 2,448 people per km^{2}.

Historical population
Year	Pop.	±% p.a.
2006	1,404	—
2013	1,377	−0.28%
2018	1,491	+1.60%
2023	1,542	+0.67%

Utuhina had a population of 1,542 in the 2023 New Zealand census, an increase of 51 people (3.4%) since the 2018 census, and an increase of 165 people (12.0%) since the 2013 census. There were 777 males, 759 females, and 3 people of other genders in 540 dwellings. 2.7% of people identified as LGBTIQ+. The median age was 36.2 years (compared with 38.1 years nationally). There were 318 people (20.6%) aged under 15 years, 309 (20.0%) aged 15 to 29, 693 (44.9%) aged 30 to 64, and 225 (14.6%) aged 65 or older.

People could identify as more than one ethnicity. The results were 49.6% European (Pākehā); 37.0% Māori; 8.9% Pasifika; 22.8% Asian; 0.8% Middle Eastern, Latin American and African New Zealanders (MELAA); and 1.9% other, which includes people giving their ethnicity as "New Zealander". English was spoken by 95.1%, Māori by 11.3%, Samoan by 0.6%, and other languages by 17.3%. No language could be spoken by 2.3% (e.g. too young to talk). New Zealand Sign Language was known by 0.4%. The percentage of people born overseas was 25.9, compared with 28.8% nationally.

Religious affiliations were 35.2% Christian, 6.6% Hindu, 0.4% Islam, 2.9% Māori religious beliefs, 1.2% Buddhist, 0.2% New Age, and 3.1% other religions. People who answered that they had no religion were 44.9%, and 6.0% of people did not answer the census question.

Of those at least 15 years old, 228 (18.6%) people had a bachelor's or higher degree, 675 (55.1%) had a post-high school certificate or diploma, and 324 (26.5%) people exclusively held high school qualifications. The median income was $39,900, compared with $41,500 nationally. 51 people (4.2%) earned over $100,000 compared to 12.1% nationally. The employment status of those at least 15 was 684 (55.9%) full-time, 153 (12.5%) part-time, and 54 (4.4%) unemployed.

== Marae ==
Mataatua Marae was established in the 1960s as a gathering place for the Tūhoe people.

Local Tuhoe had been calling for Māori Land Court to set aside land for a Tuhoe marae reservation in Rotorua. The land was ultimately made available by the Ngāti Whakaue people; the meeting hall Aroha a te Arawa was named in recognition of Tuhoe's gratitude for the gift of the land.

Families began living on the land from 1962, and Eastern Maori MP Paraone Reweti opened a community centre on the site in 1969.

In October 2020, the Government committed $3,996,258 from the Provincial Growth Fund to upgrade the marae and 7 others, creating 79 jobs.

== Education ==
Malfroy School, established in 1955, is co-educational Year 1 to 6 school, with a roll of 296 (as of October 2025).

Rotorua Boys' High School is a state secondary school, with a roll of 1,105. RBHS originated from Rotorua Public School, established in 1886, which added a Secondary Department in 1914 to become Rotorua District High School. The Secondary Department moved in the 1920s, leaving the primary school on the original site. The school split off intermediate and secondary girls' schools in the late 1950s. The District High School was renamed Rotorua Boys' High School in 1959, staying on the existing site.

John Paul College is a state-integrated Year 7 to 13 Catholic school, with a roll of 1,111. It was formed by the amalgamation of MacKillop and Edmund Rice colleges in 1987.
