= Papamoa Plaza =

- Location: Tauranga, New Zealand
- Coordinates: 37.6990°S 176.2831°E
- Address: 7 Gravatt Road Papamoa Tauranga
- Opened: 1997
- Developer: Hawridge
- Manager: Hawridge
- Owner: Tinline
- Num. of stores: 37
- Num. of anchor tenants: 2
- Floor area: 14,120 m^{2} (152,000 sq ft)
- Floors: 1
- Parking: 596 spaces
- Website: papamoaplaza.nz

Papamoa Plaza, formerly Palm Beach Plaza is a shopping complex in Papamoa, Tauranga, New Zealand, opened in 1997. It has an immediate catchment of 17,000 people; this rises to over 200,000 people in the summer holidays. There are 37 stores in the Plaza.

== History ==
The plaza opened as Palm Beach Plaza in 1997. On 5 November 2002, part of the mall was devastated by a fire that started in Shane Punjab Restaurant. Three stores were gutted, and three others were damaged. The fire caused hundreds of thousands of dollars' worth of damage. At 5am on 12 March 2006, a fire broke out in the 'Fresh Fish Market' store. The mall had installed automatic alarms since the 2002 fire, which allowed the fire to be dealt with quicker.

On 16 June 2006, the Papamoa Library and Community Centre opened adjacent to the Plaza. The 975sqm building cost $9.1 million to build.

A market used to be held on the grass next to the Plaza on the second and fourth Sunday of every month, run by the Papamoa Lions Club, but stopped operating in September 2014 due to redevelopment at the Plaza. Market organisers were given notice until the end of February 2015 to re-locate due to the centre's redevelopment.

Palm Beach Plaza was rebranded as Papamoa Plaza during renovations in 2014-2015.

In 2016, the plaza was undergoing a $20 million upgrade that was expected to enlarge it to 50 or 60 stores by the end of 2018.

== Location ==
Papamoa Plaza is located on Gravatt Road in Papamoa. There is road access to the shopping centre from both Gravatt Road and Domain Road. The shopping centre is adjacent to the Papamoa Library and is near another shopping centre (Fashion Island).
