= Lynmore =

Suburb of Rotorua, New Zealand

- Suburb
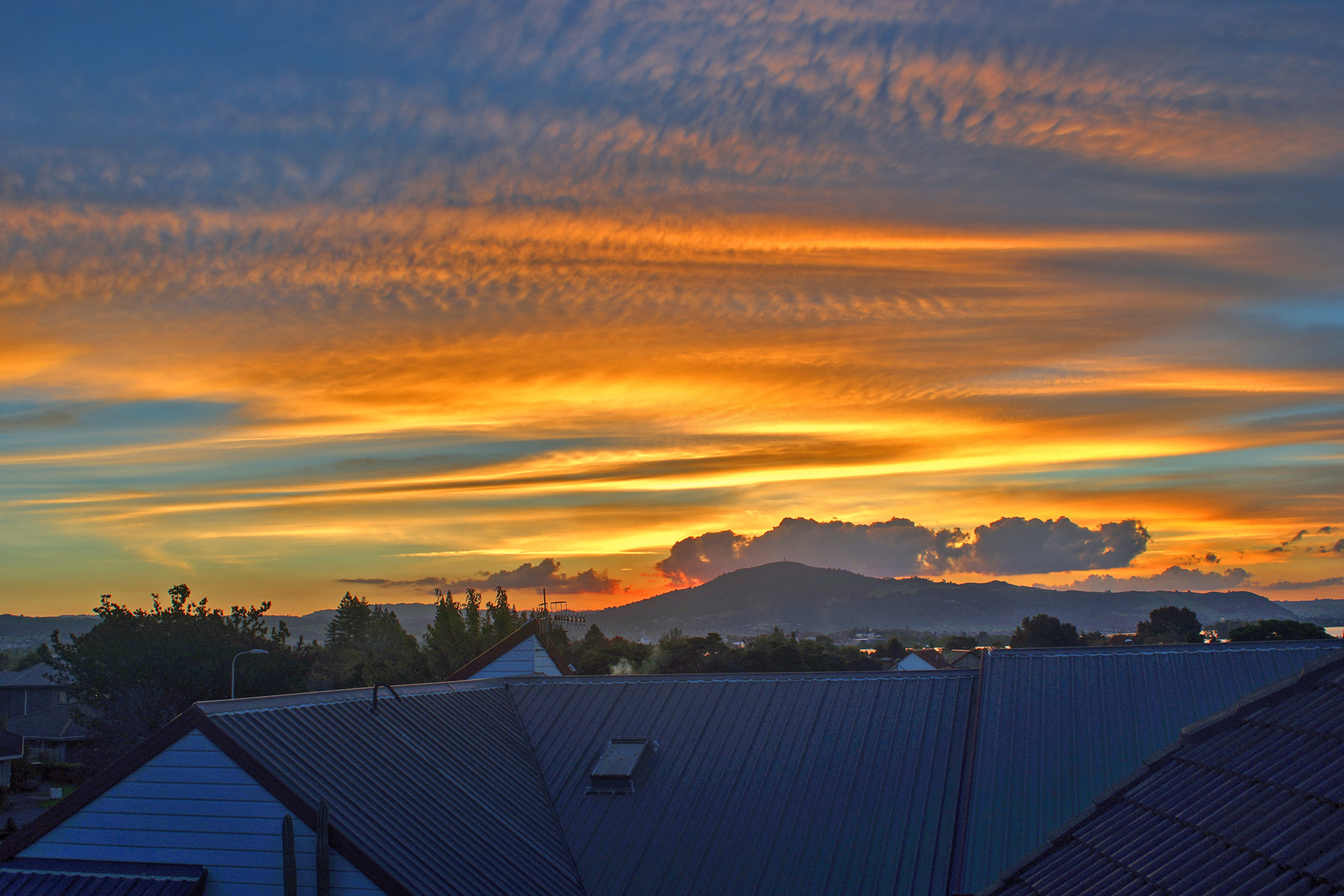
- Looking from Lynmore towards Mount Ngongotahā at sunset
- Interactive map of Lynmore
- Coordinates: 38.143571°S 176.283608°E
- Country: New Zealand
- City: Rotorua
- Local authority: Rotorua Lakes Council
- Electoral ward: Te Ipu Wai Auraki General Ward

Area
  - Land: 220 ha (540 acres)

Population (June 2025)
  - Total: 3,500
  - Density: 1,600/km^{2} (4,100/sq mi)

	(Lake Rotorua)	Ōwhata
Ngāpuna	Lynmore
	Whakarewarewa

Lynmore is a suburb of Rotorua in the Bay of Plenty Region of New Zealand's North Island.

In April 2018, Lynmore had the highest house prices in Rotorua.

== Marae ==
The local Apumoana Marae and Apumoana o te Ao Kohatu meeting house is a meeting place for the Tūhourangi hapū of Hurunga Te Rangi, Ngāti Kahupoko, Ngāti Taeotu and Ngāti Tumatawera.

== Demographics ==
Lynmore covers 2.20 km^{2} (0.85 sq mi) and had an estimated population of 3,500 as of June 2025, with a population density of 1,591 people per km^{2}.

Historical population
Year	Pop.	±% p.a.
2006	3,129	—
2013	3,255	+0.57%
2018	3,294	+0.24%
2023	3,345	+0.31%
The 2006 population is for a smaller area of 1.97 km^{2}. Source:

Lynmore had a population of 3,345 in the 2023 New Zealand census, an increase of 51 people (1.5%) since the 2018 census, and an increase of 90 people (2.8%) since the 2013 census. There were 1,665 males, 1,668 females, and 12 people of other genders in 1,260 dwellings. 2.2% of people identified as LGBTIQ+. The median age was 43.4 years (compared with 38.1 years nationally). There were 657 people (19.6%) aged under 15 years, 477 (14.3%) aged 15 to 29, 1,590 (47.5%) aged 30 to 64, and 618 (18.5%) aged 65 or older.

People could identify as more than one ethnicity. The results were 80.4% European (Pākehā); 16.1% Māori; 2.3% Pasifika; 12.1% Asian; 1.1% Middle Eastern, Latin American and African New Zealanders (MELAA); and 3.2% other, which includes people giving their ethnicity as "New Zealander". English was spoken by 97.0%, Māori by 3.9%, Samoan by 0.2%, and other languages by 14.8%. No language could be spoken by 1.6% (e.g. too young to talk). New Zealand Sign Language was known by 0.3%. The percentage of people born overseas was 26.0, compared with 28.8% nationally.

Religious affiliations were 30.8% Christian, 1.5% Hindu, 0.4% Islam, 0.7% Māori religious beliefs, 0.7% Buddhist, 0.4% New Age, 0.1% Jewish, and 1.9% other religions. People who answered that they had no religion were 57.3%, and 6.4% of people did not answer the census question.

Of those at least 15 years old, 918 (34.2%) people had a bachelor's or higher degree, 1,323 (49.2%) had a post-high school certificate or diploma, and 447 (16.6%) people exclusively held high school qualifications. The median income was $50,000, compared with $41,500 nationally. 495 people (18.4%) earned over $100,000 compared to 12.1% nationally. The employment status of those at least 15 was 1,440 (53.6%) full-time, 405 (15.1%) part-time, and 51 (1.9%) unemployed.

== Education ==
Lynmore Primary School (Te Kura ō Ōwhatiura) is a co-educational state primary school, with a roll of 631 as of July 2026. It opened in 1956.
