= Arataki =

Suburb of Tauranga, New Zealand

- Suburb
- Interactive map of Arataki
- Coordinates: 37.675751°S 176.230532°E
- Country: New Zealand
- City: Tauranga
- Local authority: Tauranga City Council
- Electoral ward: Mauao/Mount Maunganui General Ward; Arataki General Ward

Area
  - Land: 315 ha (780 acres)

Population (June 2025)
  - Total: 6,490
  - Density: 2,060/km^{2} (5,340/sq mi)

	(Bay of Plenty)
Mount Maunganui	Arataki
Matapihi	Baypark	Te Maunga

Arataki is a suburb of Tauranga, in the Bay of Plenty Region of New Zealand's North Island. Colloquially known within the region as 'ATK.'

The Bayfair Shopping Centre is located in Arataki.

== Demographics ==
Arataki covers 3.15 km^{2} (1.22 sq mi) and had an estimated population of 6,490 as of June 2025, with a population density of 2,060 people per km^{2}.

Historical population
Year	Pop.	±% p.a.
2006	5,568	—
2013	5,616	+0.12%
2018	5,949	+1.16%
2023	6,264	+1.04%

Arataki had a population of 6,264 in the 2023 New Zealand census, an increase of 315 people (5.3%) since the 2018 census, and an increase of 648 people (11.5%) since the 2013 census. There were 2,985 males, 3,264 females, and 18 people of other genders in 2,295 dwellings. 2.7% of people identified as LGBTIQ+. There were 1,146 people (18.3%) aged under 15 years, 1,173 (18.7%) aged 15 to 29, 2,817 (45.0%) aged 30 to 64, and 1,122 (17.9%) aged 65 or older.

People could identify as more than one ethnicity. The results were 80.3% European (Pākehā); 21.6% Māori; 3.0% Pasifika; 5.9% Asian; 3.4% Middle Eastern, Latin American and African New Zealanders (MELAA); and 1.6% other, which includes people giving their ethnicity as "New Zealander". English was spoken by 96.7%, Māori by 4.8%, Samoan by 0.4%, and other languages by 10.7%. No language could be spoken by 2.2% (e.g. too young to talk). New Zealand Sign Language was known by 0.4%. The percentage of people born overseas was 22.4, compared with 28.8% nationally.

Religious affiliations were 29.5% Christian, 0.9% Hindu, 0.2% Islam, 1.8% Māori religious beliefs, 0.5% Buddhist, 0.3% New Age, 0.1% Jewish, and 1.7% other religions. People who answered that they had no religion were 58.6%, and 6.3% of people did not answer the census question.

Of those at least 15 years old, 1,392 (27.2%) people had a bachelor's or higher degree, 2,550 (49.8%) had a post-high school certificate or diploma, and 1,176 (23.0%) people exclusively held high school qualifications. 624 people (12.2%) earned over $100,000 compared to 12.1% nationally. The employment status of those at least 15 was 2,631 (51.4%) full-time, 690 (13.5%) part-time, and 150 (2.9%) unemployed.

Individual statistical areas
Name	Area (km^{2})	Population	Density (per km^{2})	Dwellings	Median age	Median income
Arataki North	2.16	3,201	1,482	1,212	39.9 years	$44,200
Arataki South	0.99	3,063	3,094	1,083	34.9 years	$43,500
New Zealand					38.1 years	$41,500

== Education ==
Arataki School is a state primary school for Year 1 to 6 students, with a roll of 536. It opened in 1963 as Amanu Number 2, and changed its name to Arataki later that year.

Mount Maunganui Intermediate is a state intermediate school for Year 7 and 8 students, with a roll of 670. It opened in 1958.

St Thomas More Catholic School is a state-integrated Catholic primary school for Year 1 to 6 students, with a roll of 92.

All these schools are co-educational. Rolls are as of March 2026.
