= Ōtūmoetai Intermediate School =

Location
- Charles Street, Ōtūmoetai, Tauranga, New Zealand; 37.6752°S 176.1302°E

Information
- Type: State, Co-educational, Intermediate
- Motto: Hope, Strive, Achieve
- Ministry of Education Institution no.: 1878
- Principal: Henk Popping
- Enrolment: 949 (July 2026)
- Socio-economic decile: 7
- Website: otuinter.school.nz

Ōtūmoetai Intermediate School is a co-ed Intermediate school situated in Tauranga, New Zealand. The school roll is 949 as of July 2026.

Ōtūmoetai Intermediate offers many technology classes, taken twice a week by the students. The tech classes are visual art, dance and drama, music, food, wood work, and ICT.

== Notable alumni ==
- Luuka Jones (born 1988), Olympic slalom canoeist
