= Rotorua Seventh-day Adventist School =

Rotorua S D A School

Location
- 3 Tilsley Street, Glenholme, Rotorua; 38.150788°S 176.253125°E

Information
- Type: Integrated:State, Co-educational, Full Primary
- Established: 1953
- Ministry of Education Institution no.: 4129
- Principal: Lanea Strickland
- Enrolment: 45 (July 2026)
- Socio-economic decile: 3
- Website: http://rotoruasda.weebly.com/

Rotorua Seventh-day Adventist School is a primary school in Glenholme suburb of Rotorua, New Zealand. It is owned by the Seventh-day Adventist church and is a part of the Seventh-day Adventist education system, the world's second largest Christian school system.

== Curriculum ==
The schools curriculum consists primarily of the standard courses taught at college preparatory schools across the world. All students are required to take classes in the core areas of English, Basic Sciences, Mathematics, a Foreign Language, and Social Sciences.

== Spiritual aspects ==
All students take religion classes each year that they are enrolled. These classes cover topics in biblical history and Christian and denominational doctrines. Instructors in other disciplines also begin each class period with prayer or a short devotional thought, many which encourage student input. Weekly, the entire student body gathers together in the auditorium for an hour-long chapel service. Outside the classrooms there is year-round spiritually oriented programming that relies on student involvement.

== See also ==
- List of Seventh-day Adventist secondary schools
- Seventh-day Adventist education
