= Matapihi =

Suburb of Tauranga, New Zealand

- Suburb
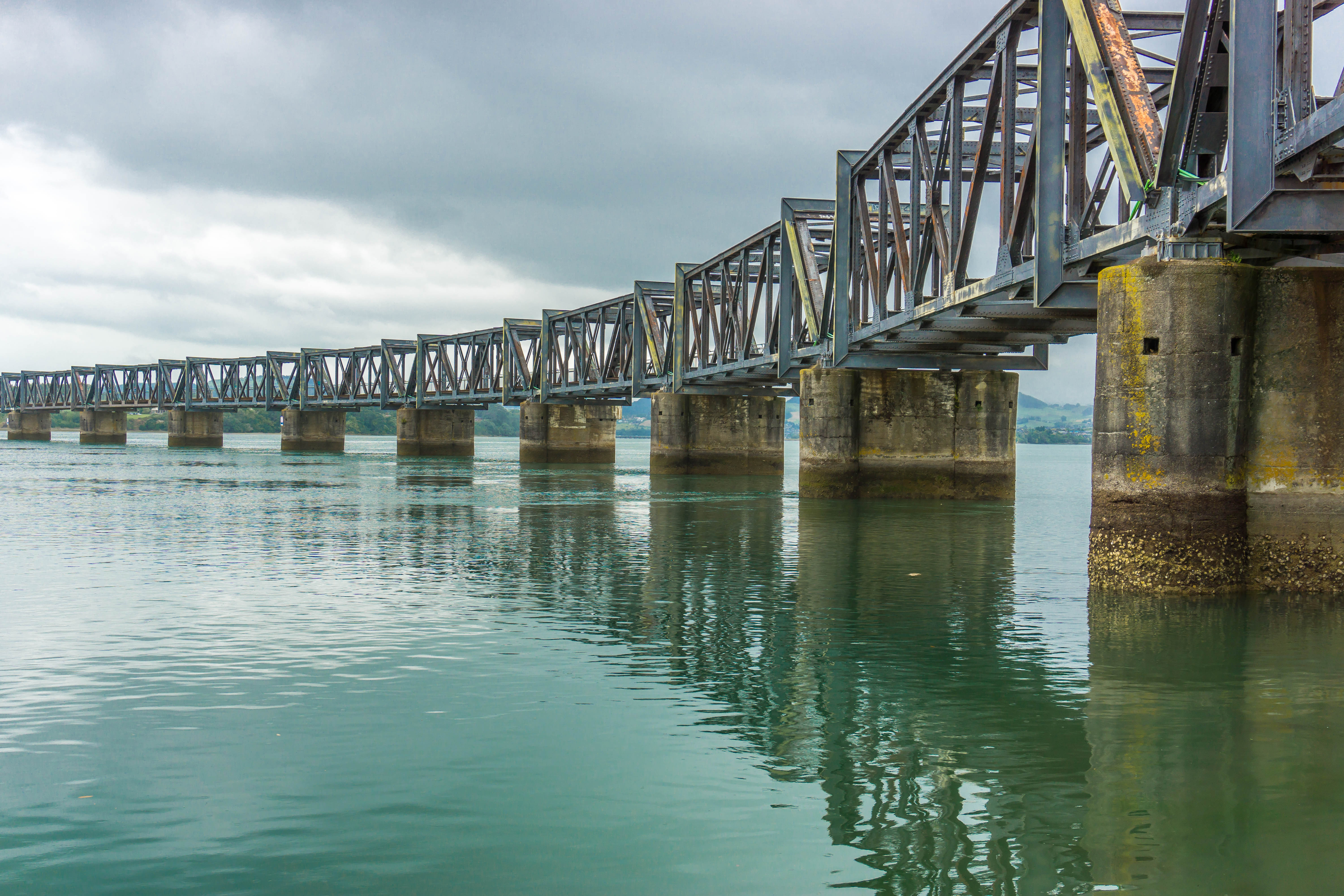
- Matapihi railway bridge to Tauranga Central
- Interactive map of Matapihi
- Coordinates: 37.696607°S 176.191083°E
- Country: New Zealand
- City: Tauranga
- Local authority: Tauranga City Council
- Electoral ward: Mauao/Mount Maunganui General Ward

Area
  - Land: 394 ha (970 acres)

Population (June 2025)
  - Total: 880
  - Density: 220/km^{2} (580/sq mi)

	(Waipu Bay)	Arataki
(Tauranga Harbour)	Matapihi
Maungatapu		(Rangataua Bay)

Matapihi is a suburb and peninsula of Tauranga in the Bay of Plenty region of New Zealand's North Island, surrounded on most sides by the Tauranga Harbour.

It is connected to Mount Maunganui in the northeast by a land bridge, and Maungatapu in the southwest by Maungatapu Bridge. State Highway 29A runs through the suburb along this diagonal.

== Demographics ==
Matapihi covers 3.94 km^{2} (1.52 sq mi) and had an estimated population of 880 as of June 2025, with a population density of 223 people per km^{2}.

Historical population
Year	Pop.	±% p.a.
2006	681	—
2013	675	−0.13%
2018	729	+1.55%
2023	837	+2.80%

Matapihi had a population of 837 in the 2023 New Zealand census, an increase of 108 people (14.8%) since the 2018 census, and an increase of 162 people (24.0%) since the 2013 census. There were 414 males, 420 females, and 3 people of other genders in 219 dwellings. 2.2% of people identified as LGBTIQ+. The median age was 36.0 years (compared with 38.1 years nationally). There were 177 people (21.1%) aged under 15 years, 186 (22.2%) aged 15 to 29, 360 (43.0%) aged 30 to 64, and 111 (13.3%) aged 65 or older.

People could identify as more than one ethnicity. The results were 36.2% European (Pākehā); 80.6% Māori; 4.7% Pasifika; 2.2% Asian; 1.1% Middle Eastern, Latin American and African New Zealanders (MELAA); and 0.7% other, which includes people giving their ethnicity as "New Zealander". English was spoken by 96.4%, Māori by 36.9%, Samoan by 0.4%, and other languages by 2.9%. No language could be spoken by 2.2% (e.g. too young to talk). New Zealand Sign Language was known by 0.4%. The percentage of people born overseas was 6.8, compared with 28.8% nationally.

Religious affiliations were 25.8% Christian, 0.4% Hindu, 24.4% Māori religious beliefs, 0.4% Buddhist, 0.4% New Age, and 0.7% other religions. People who answered that they had no religion were 43.7%, and 4.7% of people did not answer the census question.

Of those at least 15 years old, 108 (16.4%) people had a bachelor's or higher degree, 384 (58.2%) had a post-high school certificate or diploma, and 168 (25.5%) people exclusively held high school qualifications. The median income was $38,700, compared with $41,500 nationally. 60 people (9.1%) earned over $100,000 compared to 12.1% nationally. The employment status of those at least 15 was 324 (49.1%) full-time, 102 (15.5%) part-time, and 39 (5.9%) unemployed.

== Marae ==
Matapihi has two marae:

- Hungahungatoroa or Whakahinga Marae and Tāpuiti meeting house is a meeting place of the Ngāi Te Rangi hapū of Ngāi Tukairangi.
- Waikari Marae and Tapukino meeting house is a meeting place of the Ngāi Te Rangi hapū of Ngāti Tapu.

== Education ==
Te Kura o Matapihi is a co-educational Māori language immersion state primary school for Year 1 to 6 students, with a roll of 185 as of October 2025. The school opened in 1913.

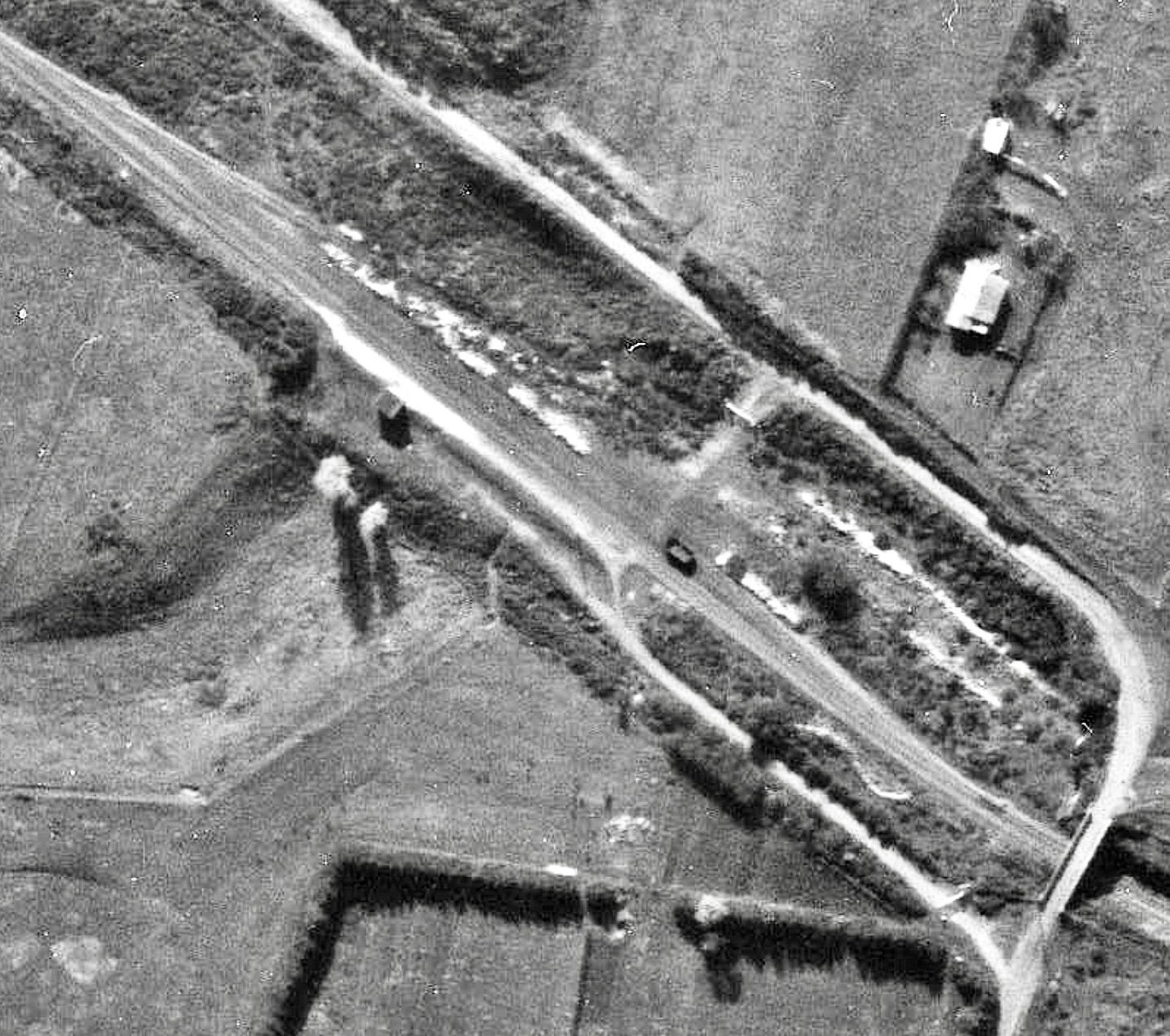
Matapihi in 1947

== Matapihi railway station ==
Matapihi railway station was a flag station on the East Coast Main Trunk (ECMT), open from 1924 to 1969. The 2 mi 51 ch (4.2 km) of line from Te Maunga to the harbour were surveyed in 1916. In 1920 there was a plan to run a ferry from the bridge embankment to Tauranga, until the bridge was completed and the rails reached Matapihi by 11 February 1921. The station was on the 4 mi (6.4 km) Te Maunga to Tauranga section, opened on Friday, 20 June 1924. When the whole ECMT opened on 28 March 1928, Matapihi had a platform, cart approach and a passing loop for 23 wagons. The station closed on 8 April 1969. In about 2015 Matapihi level crossing subsidence was corrected with engineered resin injection to lift the track by up to 94 mm (3.7 in).

Preceding station	Historical railways	Following station
Strand; Line open, station closed 2.9 km (1.8 mi); Towards Hamilton	East Coast Main Trunk; New Zealand Railways Department	Te Maunga; Line open, station closed 3.77 km (2.34 mi); Towards Tāneatua
