= Tauranga Central =

Central Business District of Tauranga, New Zealand

- Suburb
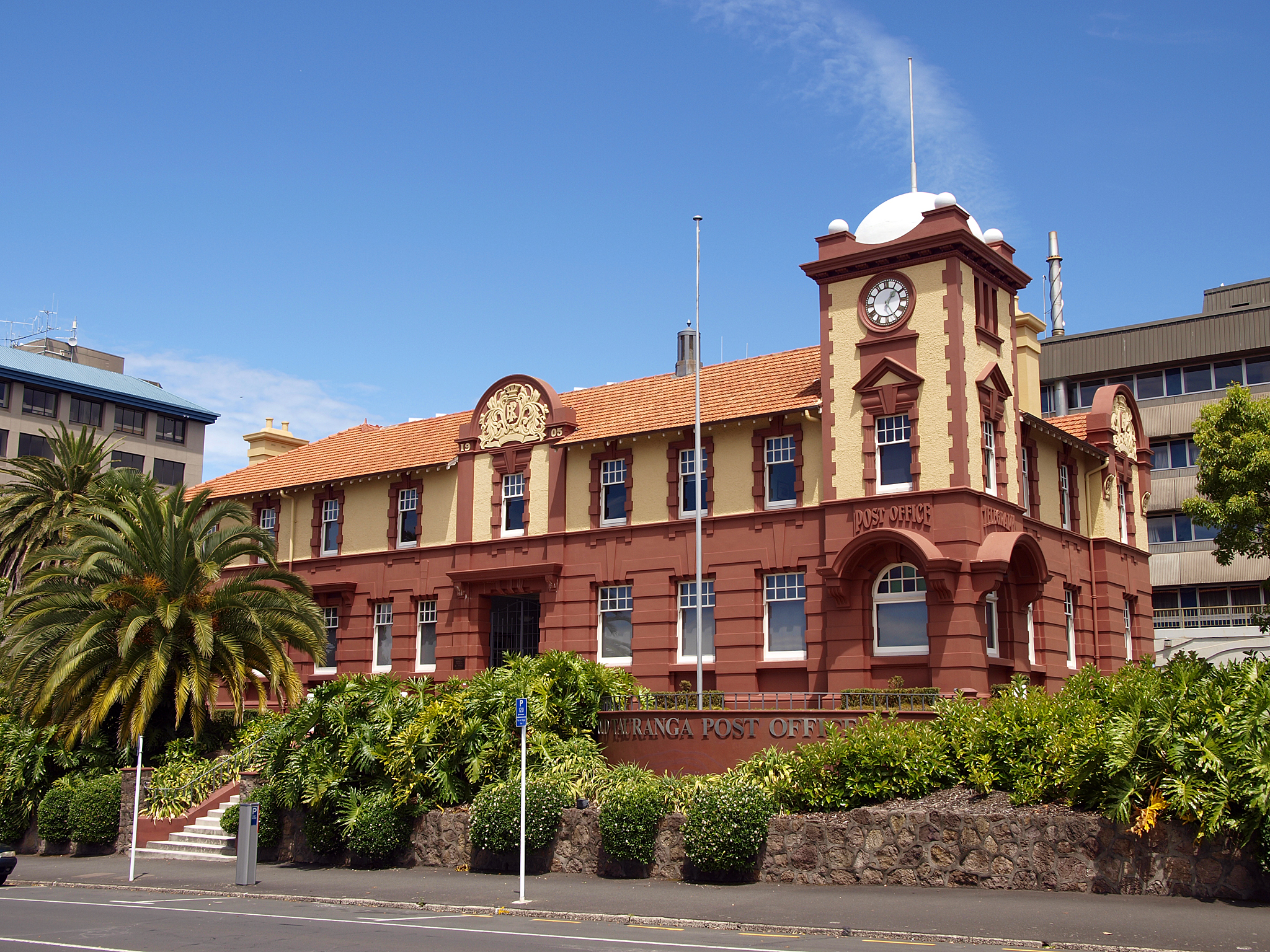
- Old Tauranga Post Office
- Interactive map of Tauranga Central
- Coordinates: 37.684363°S 176.170074°E
- Country: New Zealand
- City: Tauranga
- Local authority: Tauranga City Council
- Electoral ward: Te Papa General Ward

Area
  - Land: 540 ha (1,300 acres)

Population (June 2025)
  - Total: 4,920
  - Density: 910/km^{2} (2,400/sq mi)
- Hospitals: Tauranga Hospital

| Otūmoetai | (Tauranga Harbour) | Mount Maunganui |
| (Waikareao Estuary) | Tauranga Central | (Tauranga Harbour) |
| Tauranga South |

Tauranga Central is a suburb and the central business district of Tauranga, in the Bay of Plenty Region of New Zealand's North Island.

== Demographics ==
Stats NZ calls the CBD Tauranga Centre, which covers 5.40 km^{2} (2.08 sq mi). It had an estimated population of 4,920 as of June 2025, with a population density of 911 people per km^{2}.

Historical population
| Year | Pop. | ±% p.a. |
|---|---|---|
| 2006 | 4,242 | — |
| 2013 | 4,233 | −0.03% |
| 2018 | 4,683 | +2.04% |
| 2023 | 4,797 | +0.48% |

Tauranga Centre had a population of 4,797 in the 2023 New Zealand census, an increase of 114 people (2.4%) since the 2018 census, and an increase of 564 people (13.3%) since the 2013 census. There were 2,247 males, 2,532 females, and 15 people of other genders in 2,022 dwellings. 3.4% of people identified as LGBTIQ+. The median age was 44.1 years (compared with 38.1 years nationally). There were 660 people (13.8%) aged under 15 years, 912 (19.0%) aged 15 to 29, 1,944 (40.5%) aged 30 to 64, and 1,281 (26.7%) aged 65 or older.

People could identify as more than one ethnicity. The results were 70.4% European (Pākehā); 20.9% Māori; 4.9% Pasifika; 15.0% Asian; 1.6% Middle Eastern, Latin American and African New Zealanders (MELAA); and 2.7% other, which includes people giving their ethnicity as "New Zealander". English was spoken by 95.9%, Māori by 5.3%, Samoan by 0.9%, and other languages by 14.9%. No language could be spoken by 2.0% (e.g. too young to talk). New Zealand Sign Language was known by 0.4%. The percentage of people born overseas was 28.1, compared with 28.8% nationally.

Religious affiliations were 34.8% Christian, 3.0% Hindu, 1.1% Islam, 1.9% Māori religious beliefs, 1.0% Buddhist, 0.5% New Age, 0.1% Jewish, and 2.8% other religions. People who answered that they had no religion were 48.2%, and 7.1% of people did not answer the census question.

Of those at least 15 years old, 951 (23.0%) people had a bachelor's or higher degree, 2,061 (49.8%) had a post-high school certificate or diploma, and 1,116 (27.0%) people exclusively held high school qualifications. The median income was $37,100, compared with $41,500 nationally. 372 people (9.0%) earned over $100,000 compared to 12.1% nationally. The employment status of those at least 15 was 1,827 (44.2%) full-time, 474 (11.5%) part-time, and 162 (3.9%) unemployed.

Individual statistical areas
| Name | Area (km^{2}) | Population | Density (per km^{2}) | Dwellings | Median age | Median income |
|---|---|---|---|---|---|---|
| Tauranga Central | 3.46 | 2,679 | 774 | 1,230 | 50.8 years | $38,200 |
| Tauranga Hospital | 1.94 | 2,118 | 1,092 | 792 | 36.5 years | $36,100 |
| New Zealand | | | | | 38.1 years | $41,500 |

== Economy ==
Bay Central Shopping Centre is located in Tauranga Central. It consists of 30 stores, including Briscoes and Rebel Sport.

== Notable buildings ==
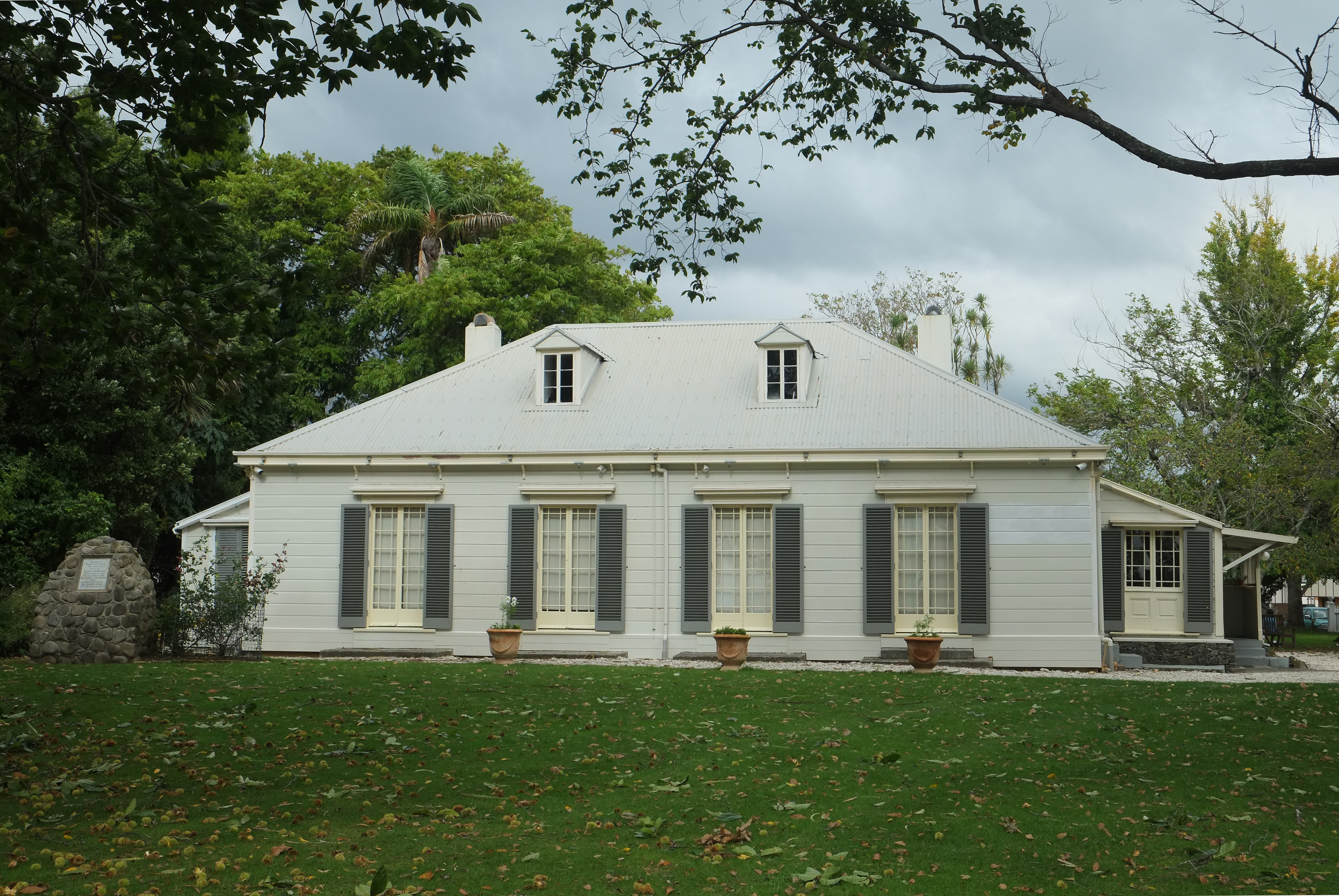
The Elms Mission House

- The Elms Mission House, 15 Mission St, 1835, oldest surviving building in the Bay of Plenty.
- Tauranga Bond Store, 1 The Strand, 1883, warehouse and bond store.
- War Memorial Gates, 45 Cameron Road, 1921, First world war memorial.
- Old Post Office, 41 Harington St, 1900s, Post Office and Government Building.
- Hotel St Amand, 105 The Strand, 1918, Hotel built to accommodate people arriving by ship.
- Brain-Watkins House, 233 Cameron Road, 1883, Private residence.
- Native School and Hostel, 83 Seventh Avenue, 1878, Early school, now a private residence.
- Taiparoro, 11 Fifth Avenue, 1882, Guesthouse.
- House and Shop, 105 Cameron Road, 1897, Two buildings, separately relocated.
- Hotel on Devonport, 72 Devonport Road, 2004, Tauranga's tallest building at 16 floors high.

== Education ==
Tauranga Primary is a co-educational state primary school for Year 1 to 8 students, with a roll of 458 as of July 2026. It started as a mission school in 1835, but closed in 1863 and became a hospital during the Tauranga campaign. It reopened about 1886. In 1871 the Central Education Board started to pay half the teacher's salary, and it became Tauranga District School. It grew and moved in 1872. A new school was formed in 1880 and moved in 1904, incorporating the original school. In 1920, the junior school moved to its own premises, and in 1944 it was renamed Tauranga Primary School.
