= Tauranga Intermediate =

Location
- 30 18th Avenue, The Avenues, Tauranga; 37.7136°S 176.1545°E

Information
- Type: State Co-educational Intermediate
- Motto: Kimihia kia taea Explore and Achieve
- Established: 1958
- Ministry of Education Institution no.: 1990
- Principal: Cameron Mitchell
- Enrolment: 1250
- Socio-economic decile: 5
- Website: tauranga-int.school.nz

Tauranga Intermediate is an Intermediate school situated in Tauranga, New Zealand. It is the largest in the country, with over 1,300 students in 45 classrooms.

== Houses ==
Tauranga Intermediate, since the early days of the school, has had house groups which over the years have changed very much.

- In the 1980s there were four houses:

Matai, Tawa, Rimu and Kauri.

- Sometime in the late 1990s two additional houses were created, these being Totara and Rata.
- In 2006 3 new houses were created being Miro, Kahikatea and Tanekaha.
- In 2009 A new house Manuka was created.
- Each house has 4 classrooms but Matai has 6

House Colours:

- Miro (Orange)
- Tawa (Dark Blue)
- Totara (Purple)
- Tanekaha (Light Blue)
- Matai (Yellow)
- Kahikatea ([Light Green)
- Rata (Black)
- Rimu (Red)
- Kauri (Dark Green)
- Manuka (Pink)

== Teachers ==
In 1993, Mr. Brian Diver became principal of Tauranga Intermediate School, but at the end of Term 1 in 2019, he resigned and was replaced by deputy principal Mr. Cameron Mitchell. Mr. Mitchell's old place of deputy principal was replaced by Mr. Arthur, who has worked as deputy principal years before.
