= Rotorua Branch =

Mothballed railway line in New Zealand

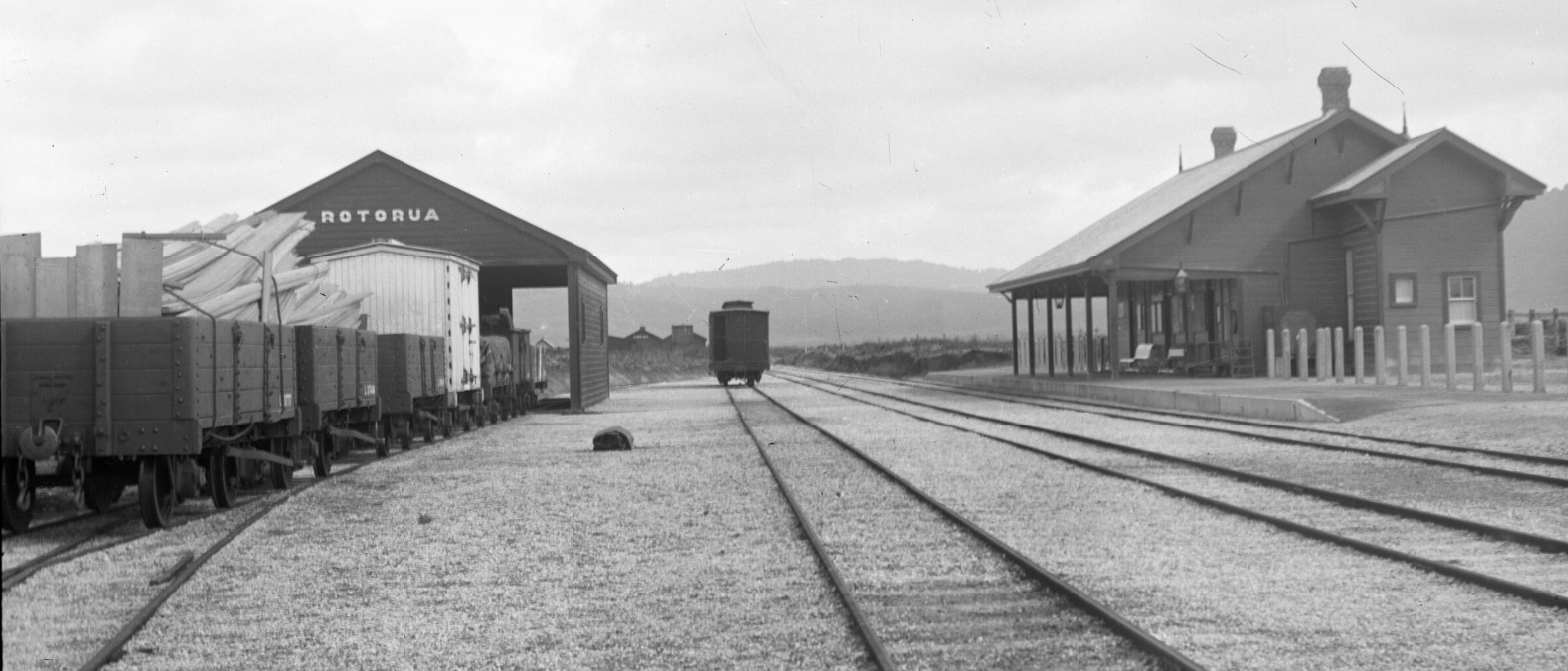
- Rotorua about 1896

Overview
- Status: Mothballed
- Owner: KiwiRail — Leased to Rotorua – Ngongotaha Rail Trust
- Locale: Waikato and Bay of Plenty
- Coordinates: 38.140347°S 176.251432°E
- Termini: Putāruru; Koutu, Rotorua

Service
- Rolling stock: None

History
- Opened: 24 November 1893
- Closed: 7 August 1989 (Rotorua city centre – Koutu); 7 October 2001 (entire line mothballed)

Technical
- Line length: 50.5 km (31.4 mi)
- Number of tracks: Single
- Character: Rural
- Track gauge: 1,067 mm (3 ft 6 in)

Map

The Rotorua Branch is a railway line from Putāruru to Rotorua, in the Waikato and Bay of Plenty regions of the North Island of New Zealand. Construction of the line was commenced by the Thames Valley and Rotorua Railway Company and finished by the Public Works Department (PWD). The complete line, 50.5 kilometres (31.4 mi) in length, opened in two sections; on 24 November 1893 to Tārukenga and the final 8 mi 43 ch (13.7 km) to Rotorua on 8 December 1894.

== History ==
The line was partially constructed by the Thames Valley and Rotorua Railway Company. The company began planning of the line from 1877, following the passing of the District Railways Act 1877. Construction of the Rotorua line did not begin until after its survey, from 1881. The survey took 12 months to find a suitable route to Rotorua over the Mamaku Ranges.

In 1882, the Tauranga East Coast and Hot Lakes District Railway was formed to build a railway line from Tauranga to Rotorua. The company failed to raise sufficient capital and folded some time after.

The Thames Valley and Rotorua Railway company only ever completed the section between Morrinsville and Tīrau (called Oxford at that time), and this opened on 8 March 1886. The Government took over its operations in 1886. From this time onwards, PWD undertook construction of the line, letting it in a series of contracts from March 1887, Daniel Fallon's Ngātira (12.41 km (7.71 mi)) and Kaponga (Mamaku) (17.08 km (10.61 mi)) contracts being first, then John Maclean and Sons to Tārukenga (7.83 km (4.87 mi)), the line there being opened on 24 November 1893. The line from Tārukenga to Rotorua (14.05 km (8.73 mi)) was begun by Stewart and Hunter in 1887. The section to Lichfield on what is now the Kinleith Branch line was opened just before the Mount Tarawera eruption (21 June 1886). The line to Rotorua was opened by Prime Minister, Richard Seddon, on Saturday 8 December 1894.

In 1879 George Vesey Stewart and others proposed a railway between Tauranga and Rotorua, but this did not eventuate.

The Rotorua line in its original form was a mainline which ran from Morrinsville through to Rotorua. With the opening of the Kaimai Tunnel in 1978, the section of line between Morrinsville and Waharoa became part of the East Coast Main Trunk line between Hamilton and Kawerau, whilst the section of line between Waharoa and Kinleith became the Kinleith Branch line. The section of line between Putāruru and Rotorua becoming the Rotorua Branch line.

=== Gisborne proposal ===
The line from Rotorua was planned to become part of a line being built from Gisborne to link with Auckland via Te Teko and Rotorua. A Gisborne-Rotorua Line from Makaraka to Mōtū of about 37 miles (60 km) was authorised by the Railways Authorisation Act, 1904. Only the Gisborne end of this proposed line was started, which later became known as the Moutohora Branch and the proposal to connect it with Auckland was later changed to be with the East Coast Main Trunk line via Tauranga, following a 1911 survey.

=== Taupo extension proposals ===
Extension of the line to Taupō had been proposed several times over the years, primarily to take advantage of forestry traffic from the region. One such proposal got as far as the construction phase in 1928, however, due to the onset of the Great Depression, work ceased a year later in 1929.

=== Paengaroa-Rotorua line proposal ===
In 1968 NZR announced a proposal to construct a new line to Rotorua from Paengaroa on the East Coast Main Trunk, with an extension to the Waipa State Mill. An extension to Taupo was also seen by NZR "as being very attractive". This proposal followed from the recommendations of a 1963 Commission of Inquiry report to investigate "Improved Access by Land to the Port of Tauranga and Bay of Plenty", which recommended:

- The construction of a deviation from Waharoa to Apata through the Kaimai Range, and the closure of the Paeroa to Apata section of the East Coast Main Trunk.
- The construction of a Rotorua to Paengaroa deviation to eliminate the Mamaku Bank on the Rotorua Branch.
- An extension of the Rotorua Branch to the Waipa State Mill.

The proposal created much attention both in support and against the idea, in particular with the proposed siting of new marshalling yards at Ngapuna, together with extending the existing Rotorua Branch line with a level crossing across Fenton Street. The proposal became a hot political debate and by 1973 NZR started to back down on the proposal and the scheme fell through shortly after.

== Services ==
Two named passenger services operated on the line. The Rotorua Express was initiated in 1894 and in 1930 became the Rotorua Limited - the most prestigious train in New Zealand at that time. The service later reverted to the Rotorua Express with more stops; and in 1959 was replaced by 88-seater Fiat railcars. This railcar service ceased in 1968. In December 1991 a new twice daily tourist-oriented service called the Geyserland Express was initiated, using Silver Fern railcars. This service lasted a decade and ceased in October 2001.

Freight on the line previously comprised forestry and livestock products railed north from Rotorua. Train loads north were limited by the Tārukenga Bank west of Rotorua between Ngongotahā and Mamaku, with a steep ruling gradient of 1 in 35.

In October 1995 Tranz Rail launched the "Bay Raider" service, utilising roadrailer wagons able to run on rail and road, to connect Auckland, Rotorua, Napier and Gisborne. Between Rotorua and Napier the road railers operated in "road" mode.

The forestry industry operated numerous sawmills on the branch line; the largest was at Mamaku, which had its own bush tramway connecting to the NZR line. The branch had 4 tramways connected to it, run by Gamman, Bartholomew Timber, South Taranaki and Selwyn Timber. For many years after World War II sheep and cattle from land developments south of Rotorua were railed by special stock trains to the large abattoirs or freezing works in the South Auckland suburbs of Westfield and Southdown. Now there are local freezing works served by road transport, and stock numbers (particularly sheep) have reduced.

== Stations ==
The stations were -

Station	Distance from Putāruru Junction	Opened	Closed passenger	goods	Height above sea level
Pinedale	3.34 km (2.08 mi)	24 November 1893	12 November 1968	18 February 1987	155 m (509 ft)
Selwyn Mill in 1912 Selwyn Timber Co siding - The company was formed in 1907, after it had bought part of the Selwyn Settlement, sold by the government in 1906, to a partnership, trading as Selwyn Timber. In 1907 Selwyn Timber advertised for an engine driver. The tramways into the bush extended for about 21 km (13 mi) and had 3 branches. Passengers were sometimes carried on the tramway. The mill went into liquidation in 1930. A 1923 A & G Price Type E locomotive has been preserved at the Bush Tramway Club and a tunnel remains on one of the branch lines.	7.02 km (4.36 mi)	1907, 1914 passengers	22 June 1958	22 June 1958	190 m (620 ft)
Bartholomews Siding	9.53 km (5.92 mi)	from at least 1911	to at least 1943	to at least 1943	229 m (751 ft)
Ngātira - listed brick water tower remains	11.8 km (7.3 mi)	24 November 1893	12 November 1968	18 February 1987	287 m (942 ft)
Arahiwi	22.38 km (13.91 mi)	24 November 1893	25 January 1960	25 January 1960	530 m (1,740 ft)
Mamaku (Kaponga until 4/6/1892)	28.88 km (17.95 mi)	24 November 1893	12 November 1968 (reopened July 1991-10 December 2001)	26 April 1981	612 m (2,008 ft)
Tārukenga	36.71 km (22.81 mi)	24 November 1893	12 November 1968	18 February 1987	392 m (1,286 ft)
Ngongotaha	42.51 km (26.41 mi)	8 December 1894	12 November 1968 (reopened July 1991-10/12/2001)	12 November 1968	284 m (932 ft)
Koutu	48.19 km (29.94 mi)	8 December 1894	12 November 1968 (reopened July 1991-10/12/2001)	10 June 2000	283 m (928 ft)
Rotorua	50.76 km (31.54 mi)	8 December 1894	12 November 1968	18 August 1989	285 m (935 ft)

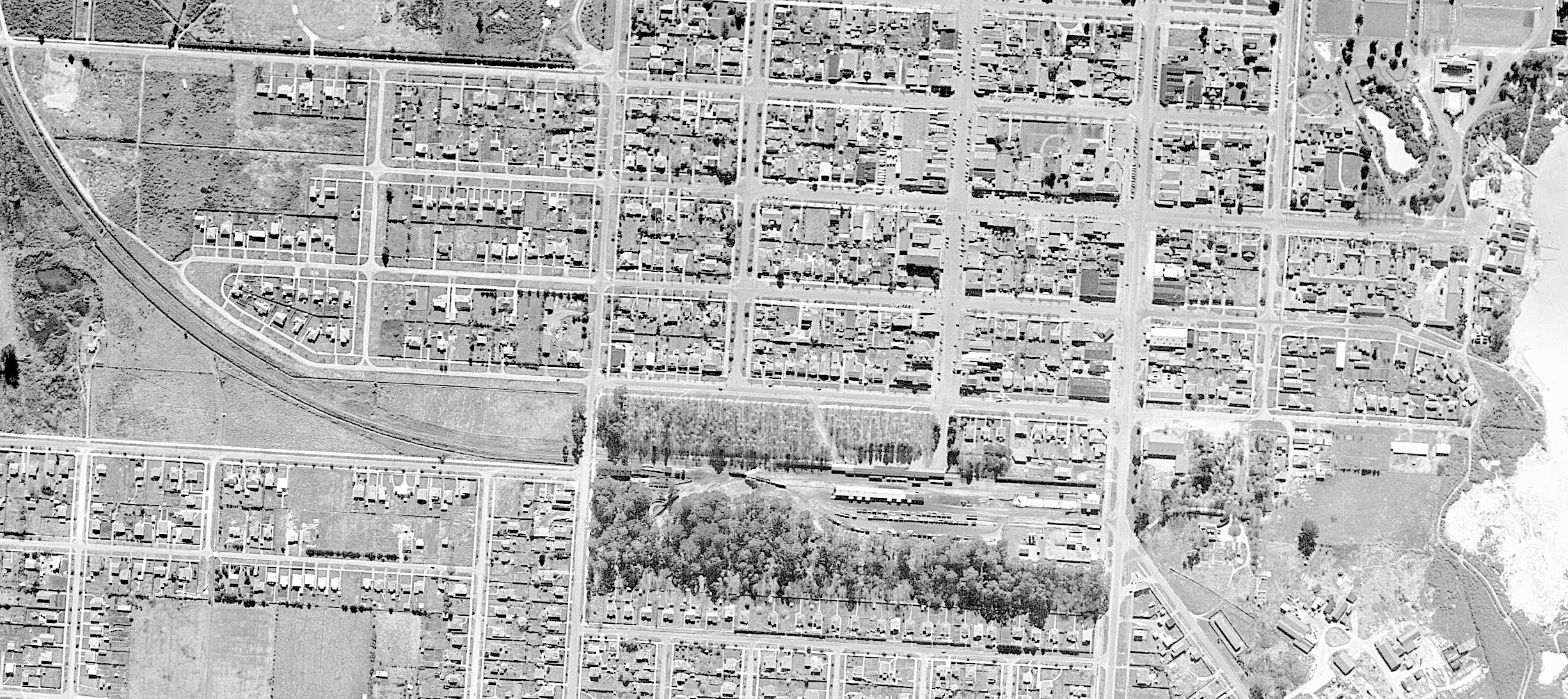
Rotorua in 1945 - railway station in bottom centre of photo, bounded by Amohau and Fenton Streets

=== Rotorua station relocation ===
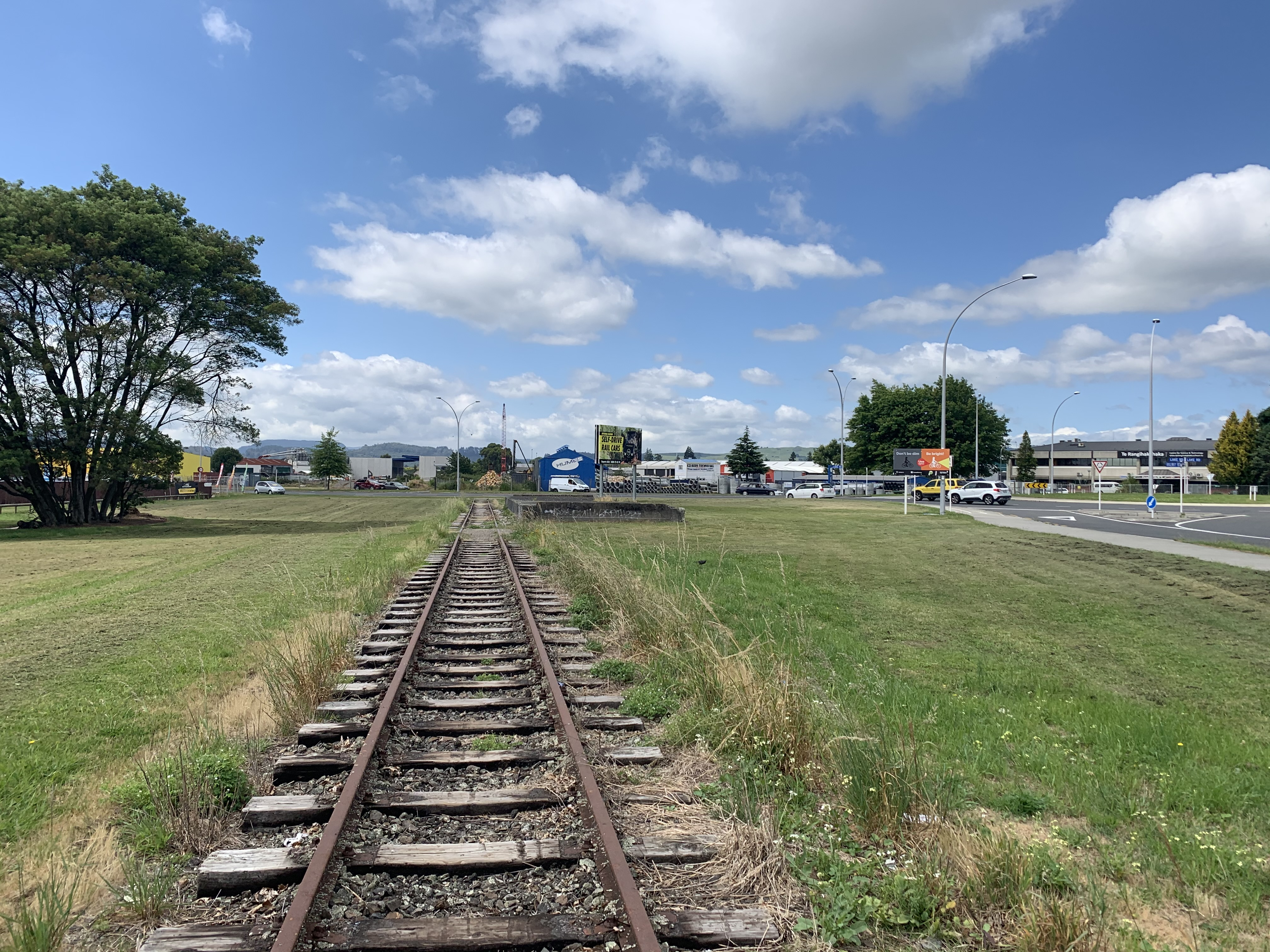
The derelict site of Koutū railway station in December 2019, eighteen years after the Geyserland Express last ran.

In August 1989 the Rotorua central city station and rail yard was closed and, along with the last 2 km of the line, removed and relocated to a new site at Koutu.

The Geyserland Express railcar service initially terminated in the Koutu freight yard until a small temporary passenger station operated by the Second Chance Train Trust opened on the northern side of the Lake Road overbridge in 1995. The new passenger station at Koutu was intended as temporary measure until the line could be relaid to a proposed new passenger station in the central city on the corner of Ranolf and Amohau Streets, which was being pursued by the Second Chance Train Trust and the Rotorua District Council. In June 1995 the Rotorua District Council considered a report for building a new terminal, but the new station never eventuated.

== Decline ==
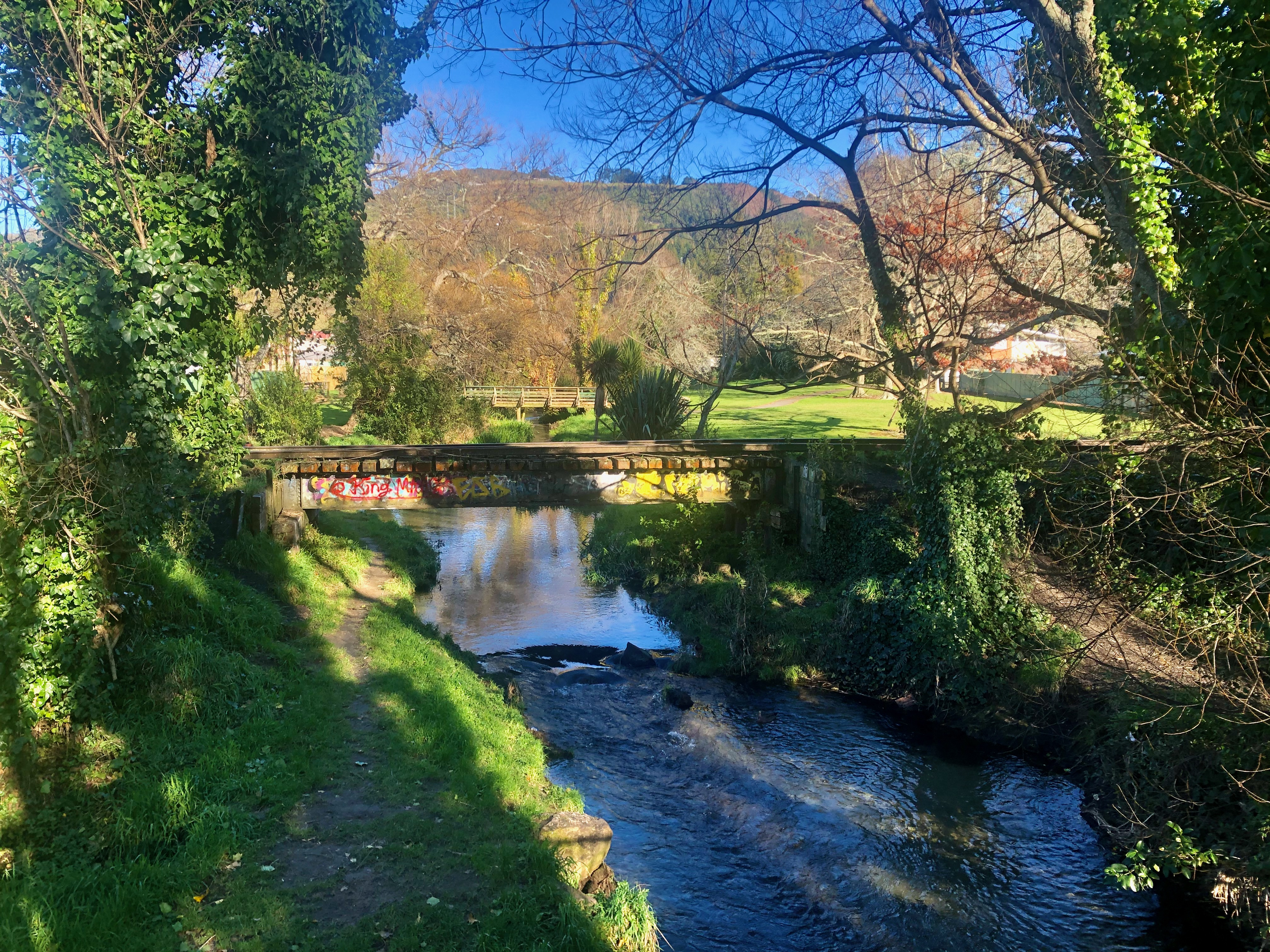
Bridge over Waiowhiro Stream, about 2km from the Koutu end of the line, in 2021

During the late 1990s traffic on the line gradually declined with the twice-daily Geyserland Express railcar service being reduced in 1995 to a daily service with twice-daily services on Fridays and Sundays only, and in 1996 reduced to a daily service on all days. The nightly Bay Raider freight service was cancelled in June 2000 and the Geyserland Express was cancelled in October 2001.

Since this time the line has fallen into disrepair, with slips, overgrown vegetation and sections of the line being stolen.

In 2012, the Rotorua District Council demolished the Lake Road overbridge at Koutu to enable the widening of Lake Road to four lanes, to be built across the railway line at this locality. The new four-lane road was built over the top of the track, which now separates the former Koutu freight yard from the mainline. The bridge had been built in 1937 to replace a level crossing. New Zealand Railways Corporation still own the rail corridor across the road south through to Pukuatua Street.

The former rail corridor south of Pukuatua Street has since been relinquished and now been developed over in conjunction with a retail development on the neighbouring former Telecom depot site.

== Reopening ==
On 13 January 2009, the Geyserland Express Trust announced that it had commissioned and received a report on the feasibility of reopening the line between Putaruru and Rotorua, which put the cost of doing so at $8.3 million. Work required included:

- Clearing vegetation
- Replacing missing sections of track
- Rehabilitation of some of the bridges
- Checking drains and culverts
- Establishing a new station at Rotorua

The interested parties planned to establish a working group to determine the level of demand and economic feasibility of services on the line.

In December 2009 KiwiRail leased the Rotorua Branch line (Putaruru - Koutu) to the Rotorua Ngongotaha Rail Trust, which has since worked on plans to turn the unused corridor and track into a tourism venture. The trust has restored part of the line and did initially have discussions with the Rotorua District Council to assist with its plans to continue the national cycleway system in the District at the time of acquiring the line. The trust hopes that when the line is fully repaired, it will be possible for freight and passenger services to resume, with steam enthusiast operators from around New Zealand, able to bring their own excursion trains to Rotorua.

== Current status ==
The line remains closed to heavy rail traffic, while the eastern section from the summit at Mamaku towards Rotorua is used by rail adventure tourism company New Zealand Rail Ventures trading as Railcruising. Working with KiwiRail, the company operates its New Zealand-designed and built "rail cruisers" on a section of the branch line between Mamaku and Ngongotaha. They have constructed a station at Mamaku and Ngongotaha (2024).

Many sections of the western track from Mamaku towards Putāruru have been lifted or are heavily overgrown and not used. The lower portions of the track in Putāruru where it branches off the Kinleith Branch are heavily overgrown with gorse and blackberry - some sections have been commandeered by neighbouring businesses for temporary storage, in other places the track has been lifted and no signs of its existence remain.

== See also ==
- East Coast Main Trunk
- Cambridge Branch
- Glen Afton Branch
- Glen Massey Line
- Kimihia Branch
- Kinleith Branch
- Thames Branch
- Mountain Rimu Timber Company tramway
