= Tauranga railway station =

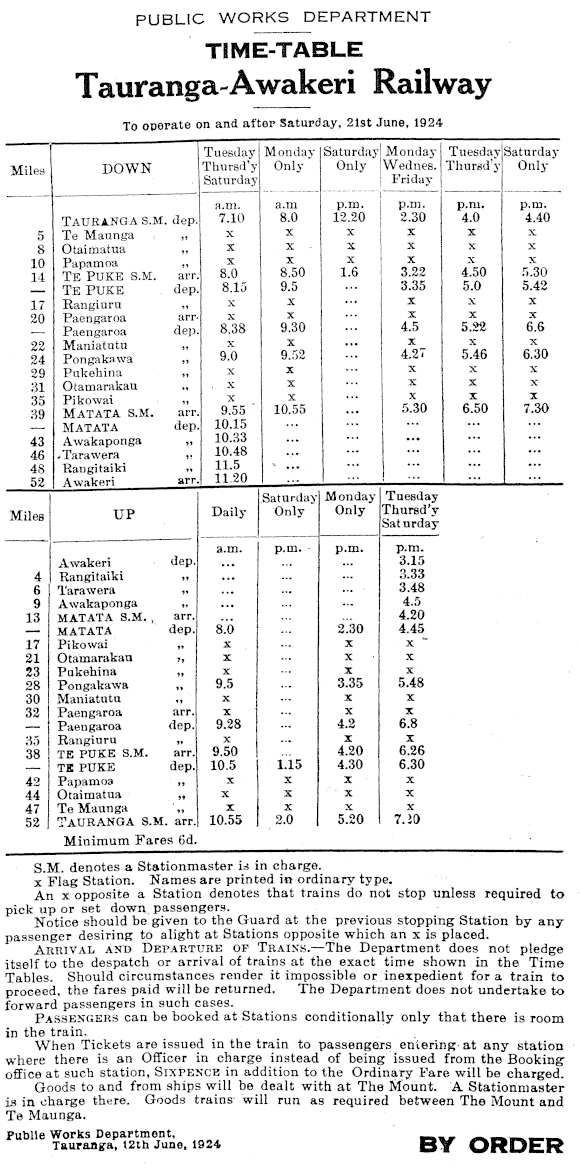
The first Tauranga timetable

Tauranga railway station was located at Tauranga on the East Coast Main Trunk Railway (ECMT). It was a passenger station from 1924 to 1986, 97.06 km (60.31 mi) from the start of the ECMT at Hamilton. There was also a small station in the centre of town at Strand, finally closed in 2001. Although regular passenger services have ended, it is one of KiwiRail's busiest lines, with up to 86 freight trains a week between MetroPort Auckland and Tauranga (Sulphur Point and Mount Maunganui). Of the original buildings, the 1927 cargo shed is the only one to survive.

== History ==
In 1882, a company was formed, the Tauranga East Coast and Hot Lakes District Railway, to build a railway from Tauranga to Rotorua. The company failed to raise sufficient capital for the venture and was dissolved in 1886.

In 1906 William Hall Jones, the Minister of Public Works visited Tauranga and announced that a railway must come to Tauranga. It took another 22 years to complete. The 38 mi (61 km) Tauranga-Matatā railway, was built by the Public Works Department (PWD) and opened in stages; Maunganui-Te Puke opened on 16 October 1913, extended to Paengaroa by April 1917, to Matatā about late July 1917, to Awakeri on 12 November 1923 and the 4 mi (6.4 km) Te Maunga to Tauranga section on Friday, 20 June 1924. The whole ECMT, from Auckland to Tāneatua, was opened at the Strand on Wednesday 28 March 1928 by the Prime Minister, Gordon Coates, and transferred from PWD to New Zealand Railways (NZR) on 18 June 1928 for the Tahawai-Tauranga section and Tauranga-Tāneatua, on 2 September 1928.

In 1913 a temporary railway wharf was built, but then it was not until 1923 that a station and wharf accommodation were mentioned. In 1925 an engine shed was built and, when the railway fully opened in 1928, there was a platform, cart approach, 60 ft (18 m) x 30 ft (9.1 m) goods shed, loading bank, cattle and sheep yards, 70 ft (21 m) turntable, engine shed, 50-ton coal store, passing loop for 68 wagons, 6,000 gallon water vats with 9 inch hose pipes at each end of the station and a traverser at the wharf. PWD built a quay of about 710 ft (220 m), known as the Railway Wharf, with a spur line from the ECMT. The cargo shed was completed in 1927, although at first the wharf provided only 320 ft (98 m) of berthage. The cargo shed had sliding doors to the wharf and a landing for motor trucks on its Dive Crescent frontage, with some cargo transferred direct from ship to railway wagon, some into the shed and some to trucks. Sometimes the wharf was too busy and ships had to wait. In March 1965 Poranui was the last Northern Steamship Co coaster to visit the Railway Wharf. After the Tauranga Harbour Bridge was built in 1988 only small ships could reach the wharf.

In 1935 mixed trains from Auckland reached Tauranga at 10am, 12.55pm and the Tāneatua Express at 4.41pm. It had a 10-minute refreshment stop. Refreshment rooms opened on 5 December 1928. They were 100 ft (30 m) long with a 56 ft (17 m) x 19 ft (5.8 m) counter room, 19 ft (5.8 m) x 16 ft (4.9 m) and kitchen, stores, staff, milk, ham, fuel and lumber rooms. The roof had Marseilles tiles and the 20 ft (6.1 m) wide verandah matched that of the station, with a total length of 250 ft (76 m). Although passenger services ended in 1967, the rooms remained in 1969, to cater for the Road Services. Railway houses were built; in 1910 an 8-roomed house and platelayers' cottages, 1921 a house, 1922 the stationmaster's house and 4 houses, 1925 2, 1926 cottages 1928 20 houses and state houses in 1953 (2), 1955 (6) and 1956 (7).

From 30 March 1928 a guard, driver, acting driver, acting fireman, W^{W} engine, 2 passenger cars and a bogie van were transferred from Tahawai to Tauranga, to work all the trains between Tauranga and Waihi. Taxis met trains at Tauranga, as the CBD was a kilometre south of the station. In 1933 Shell built a private siding. In 1973 kauri trees were felled when a new NZR telephone exchange was built.

Passenger services ended on 11 September 1967 and the main station was demolished in 1986. The 1927 cargo shed remains and was refurbished as an events venue in 2023.

Preceding station	Historical railways	Following station
Otūmoetai; Line open, station closed 2.97 km (1.85 mi); Towards Hamilton	East Coast Main Trunk; New Zealand Railways Department	Strand; Line open, station closed 1.09 km (0.68 mi); Towards Tāneatua

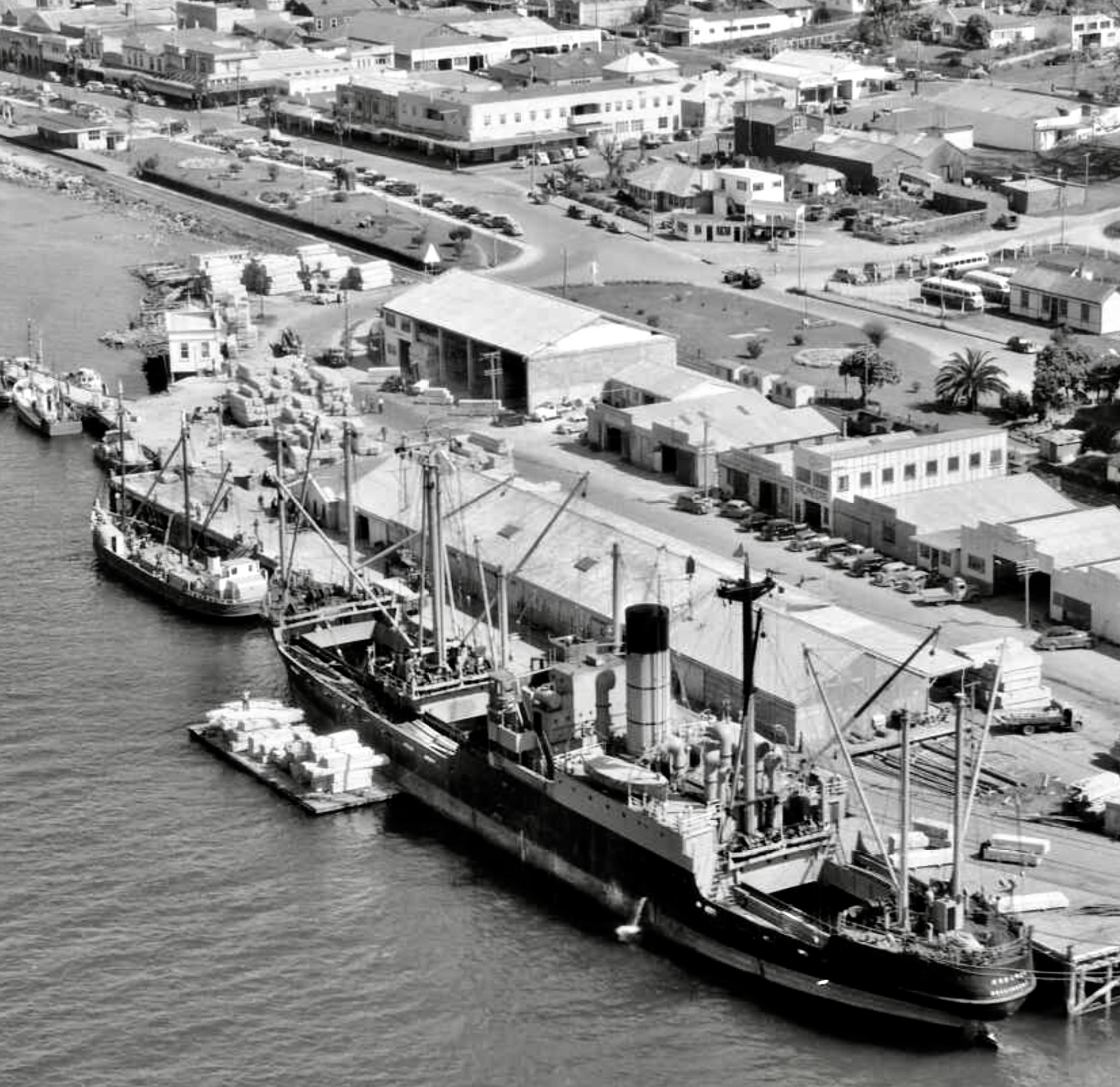
Railway Wharf, Cargo Shed and SS Korowai in 1954. Strand station is background left

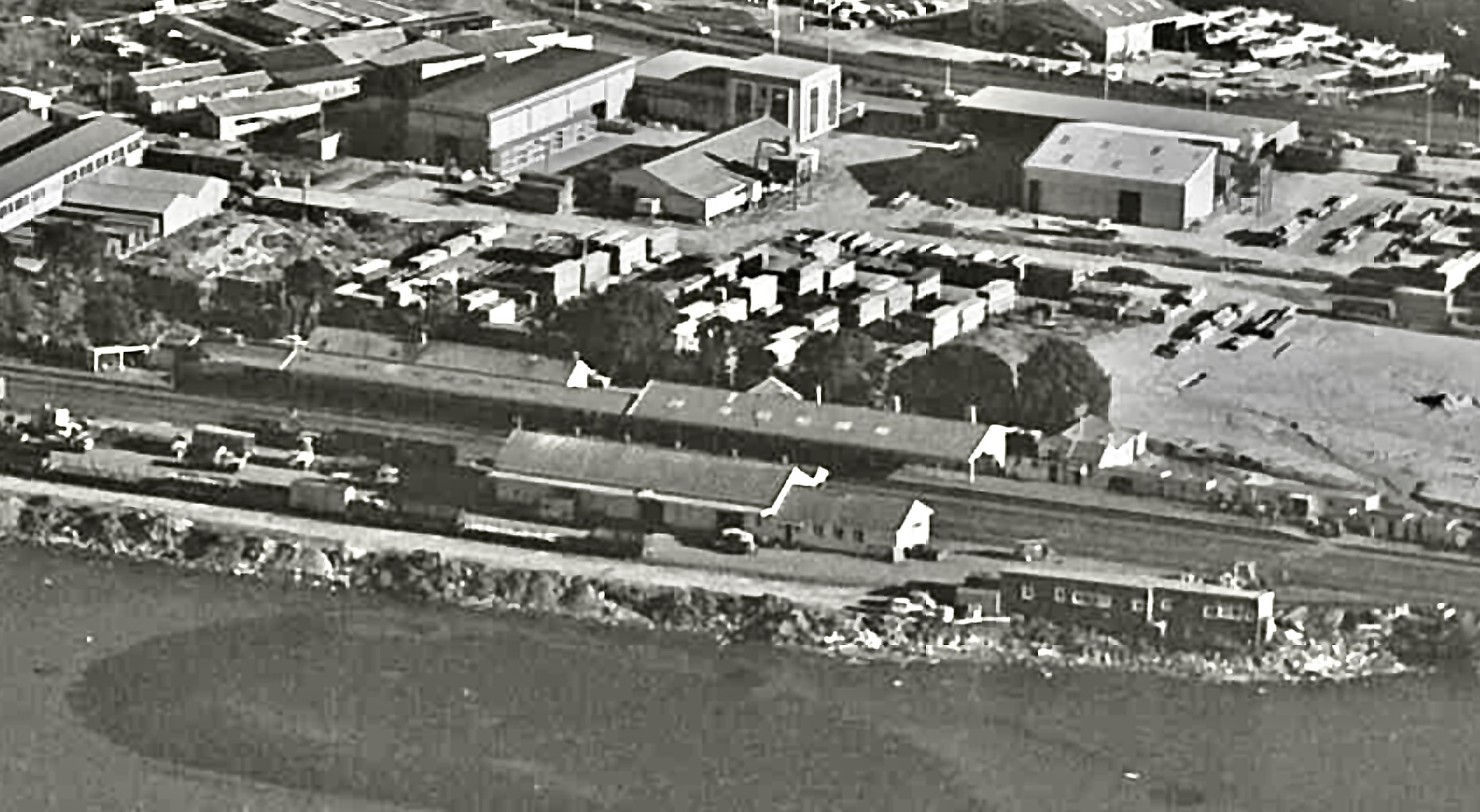
Tauranga railway station in 1968

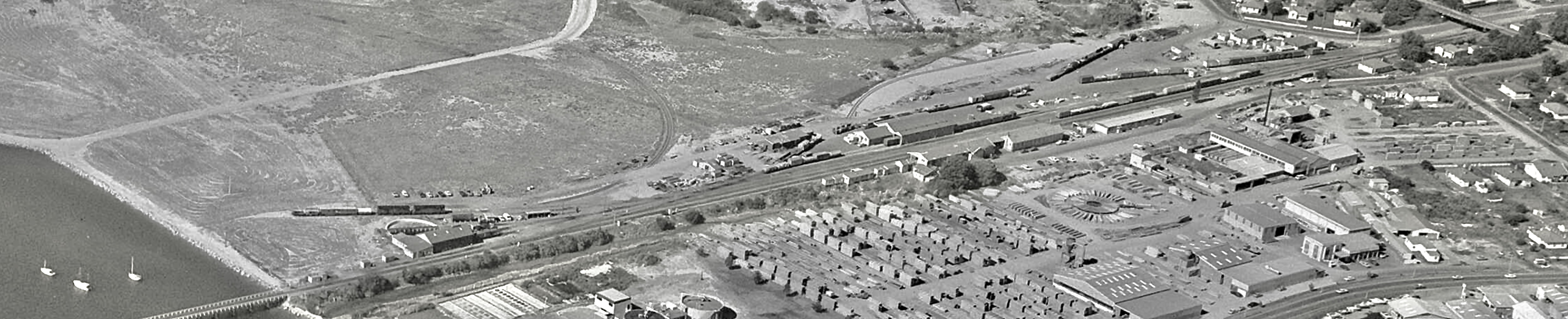
Station in 1976

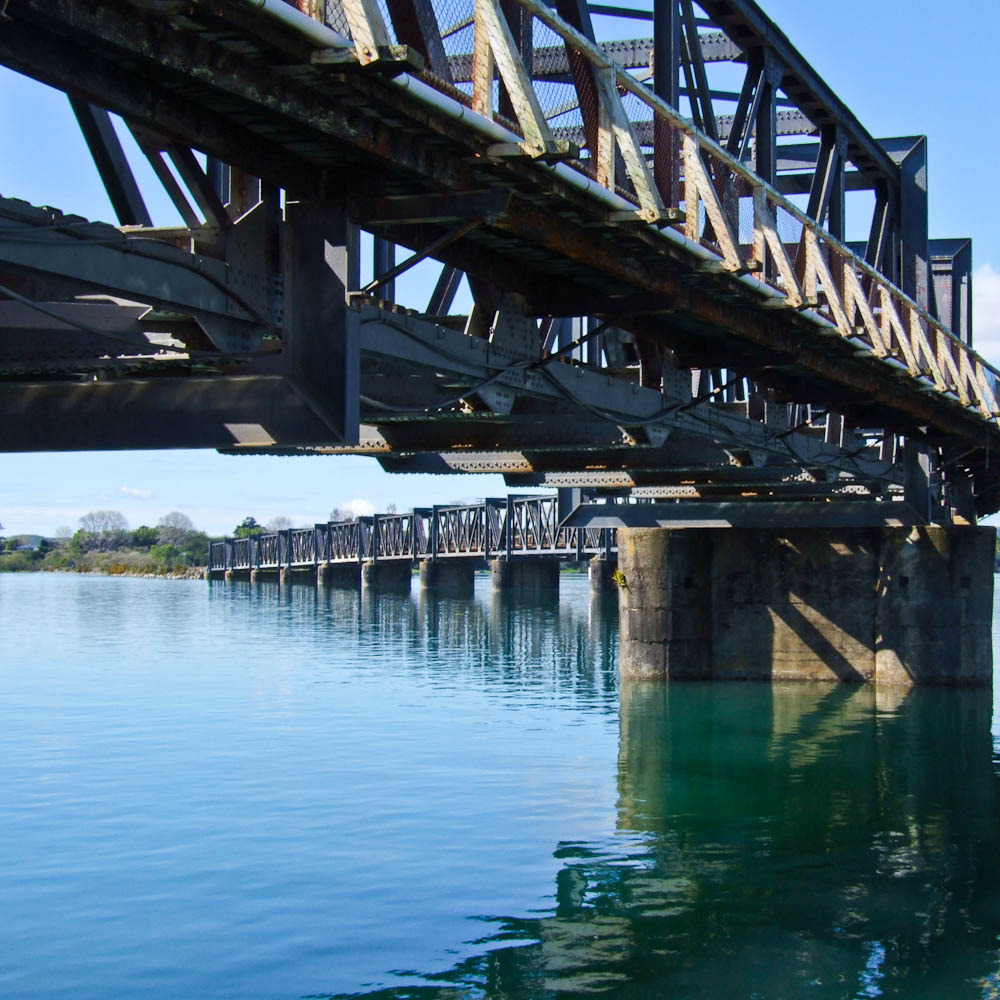
Tauranga railway bridge

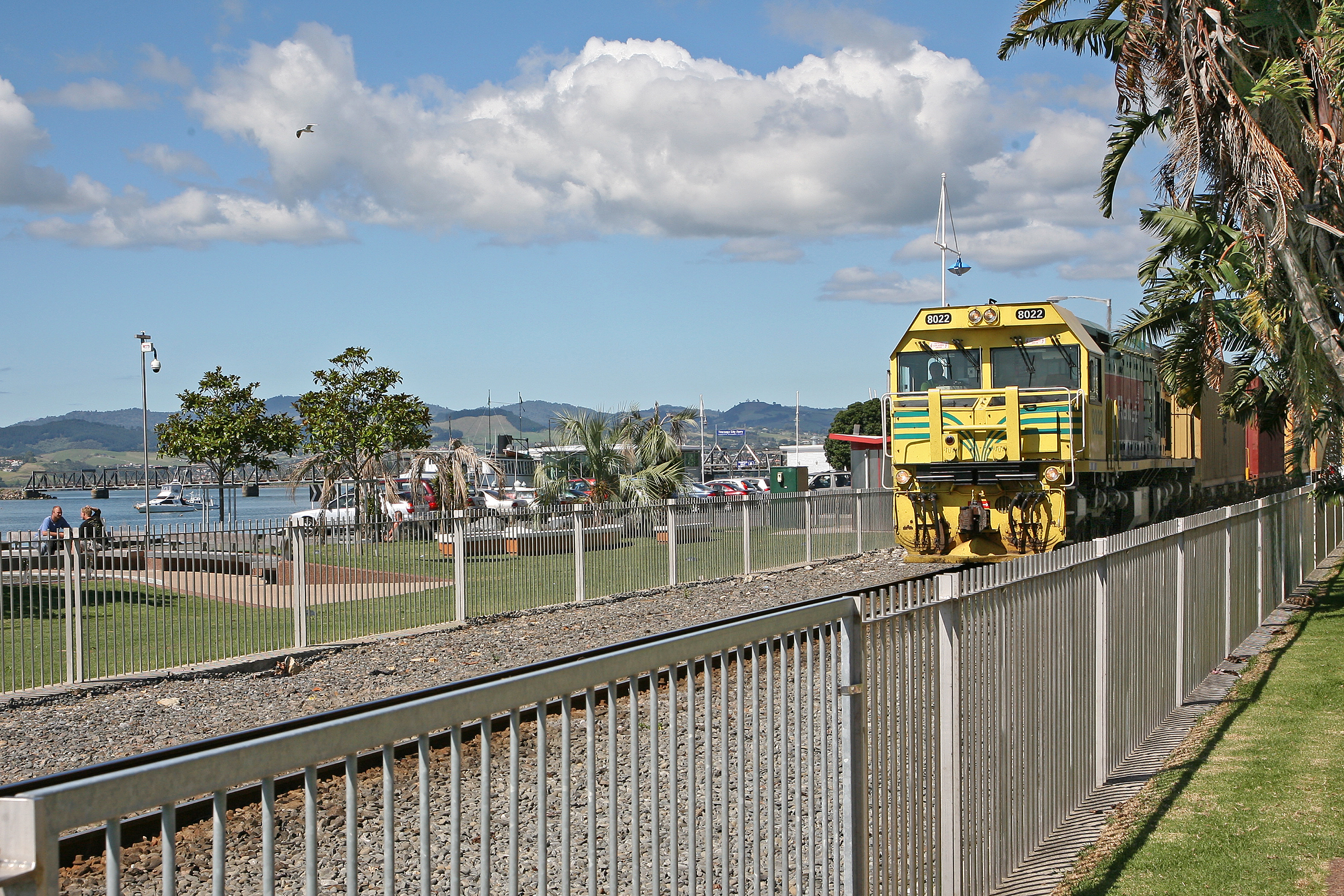
A KiwiRail train on the East Coast Main Trunk Railway which runs through the central city.

== Strand railway station ==
Strand railway station was not included in the original plans for the line and was not shown in the 1924 timetable, but by March 1928 it had a platform and cart approach and, by the handover to NZR in September, it also had a station building. On 22 May 1978 it was noted that it had no building and on Saturday 24 June 1978 it closed to all traffic. The Tauranga-Auckland Kaimai Express ran from Monday 9 December 1991 until Sunday 7 October 2001, using Strand as its terminal, when "Tauranga station was built on the site of the old Strand station". The station has since been demolished.

Preceding station	Historical railways	Following station
Tauranga; Line open, station closed 1.09 km (0.68 mi); Towards Hamilton	East Coast Main Trunk; New Zealand Railways Department	Matapihi; Line open, station closed 2.9 km (1.8 mi); Towards Tāneatua

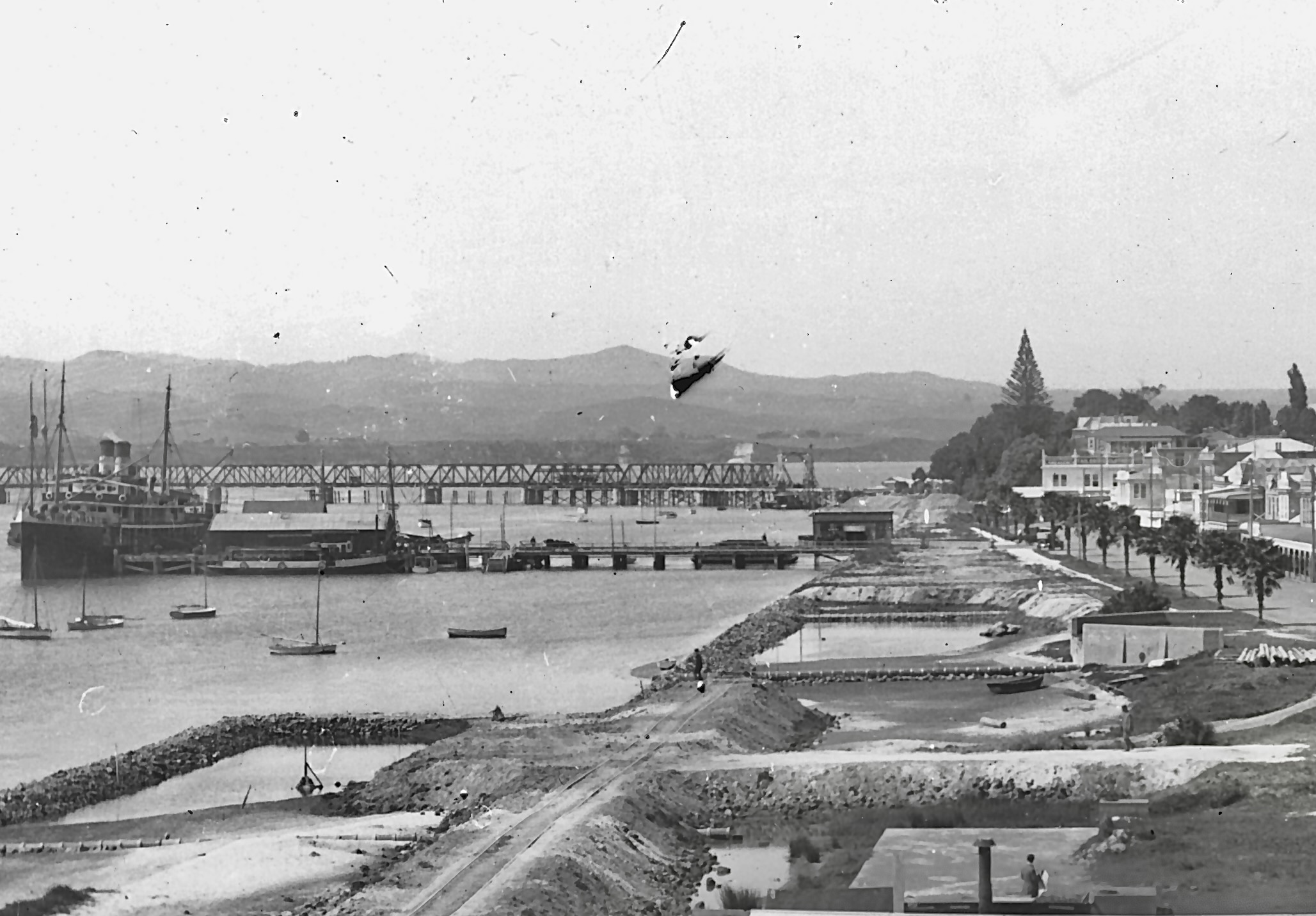
ss Matangi and Strand in 1923

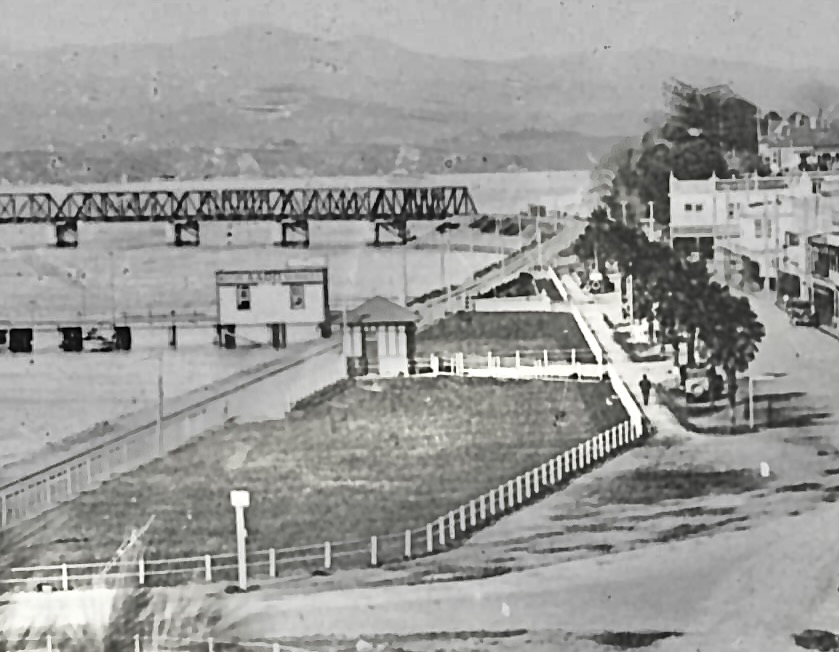
Strand c 1927

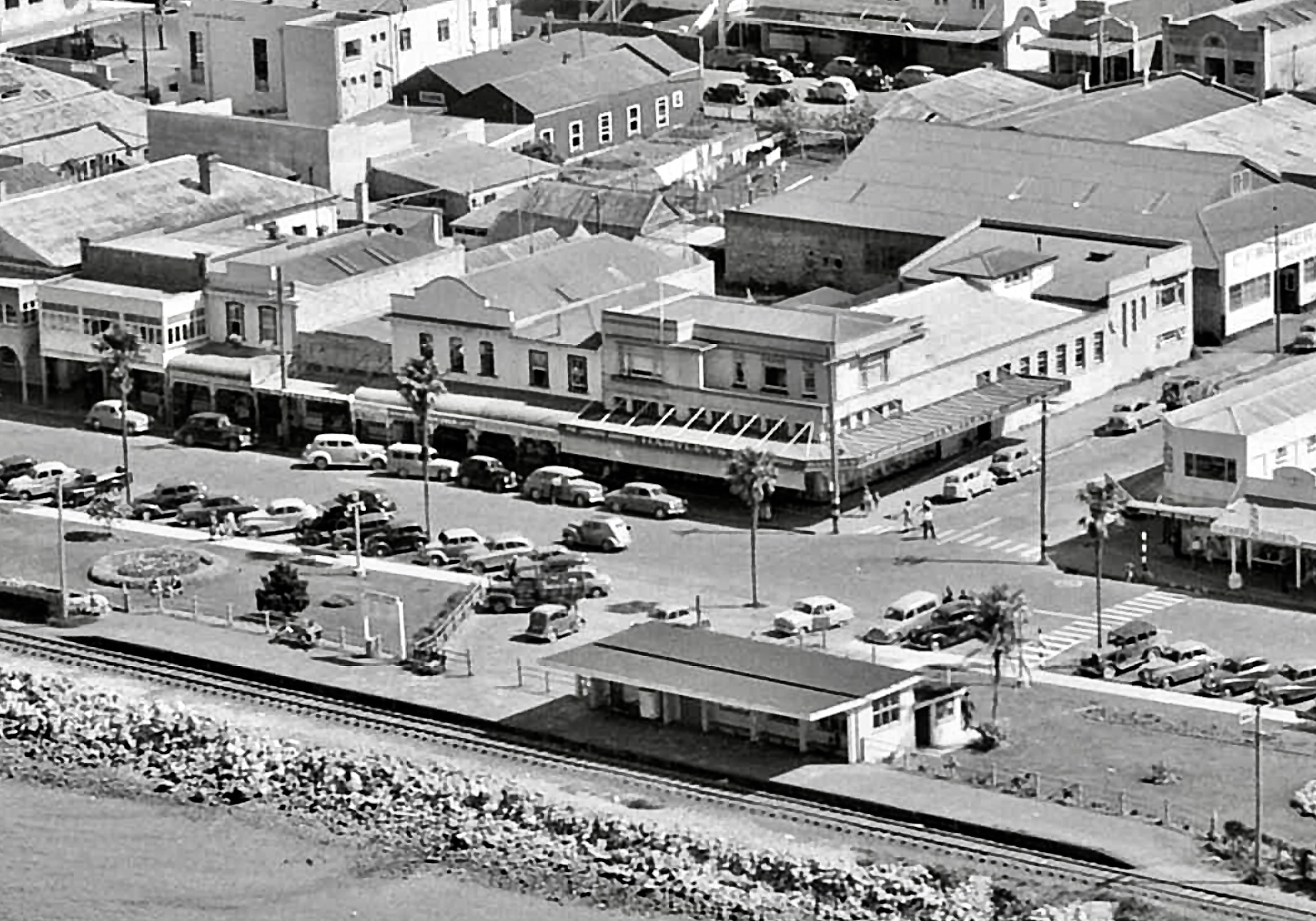
Strand in 1954

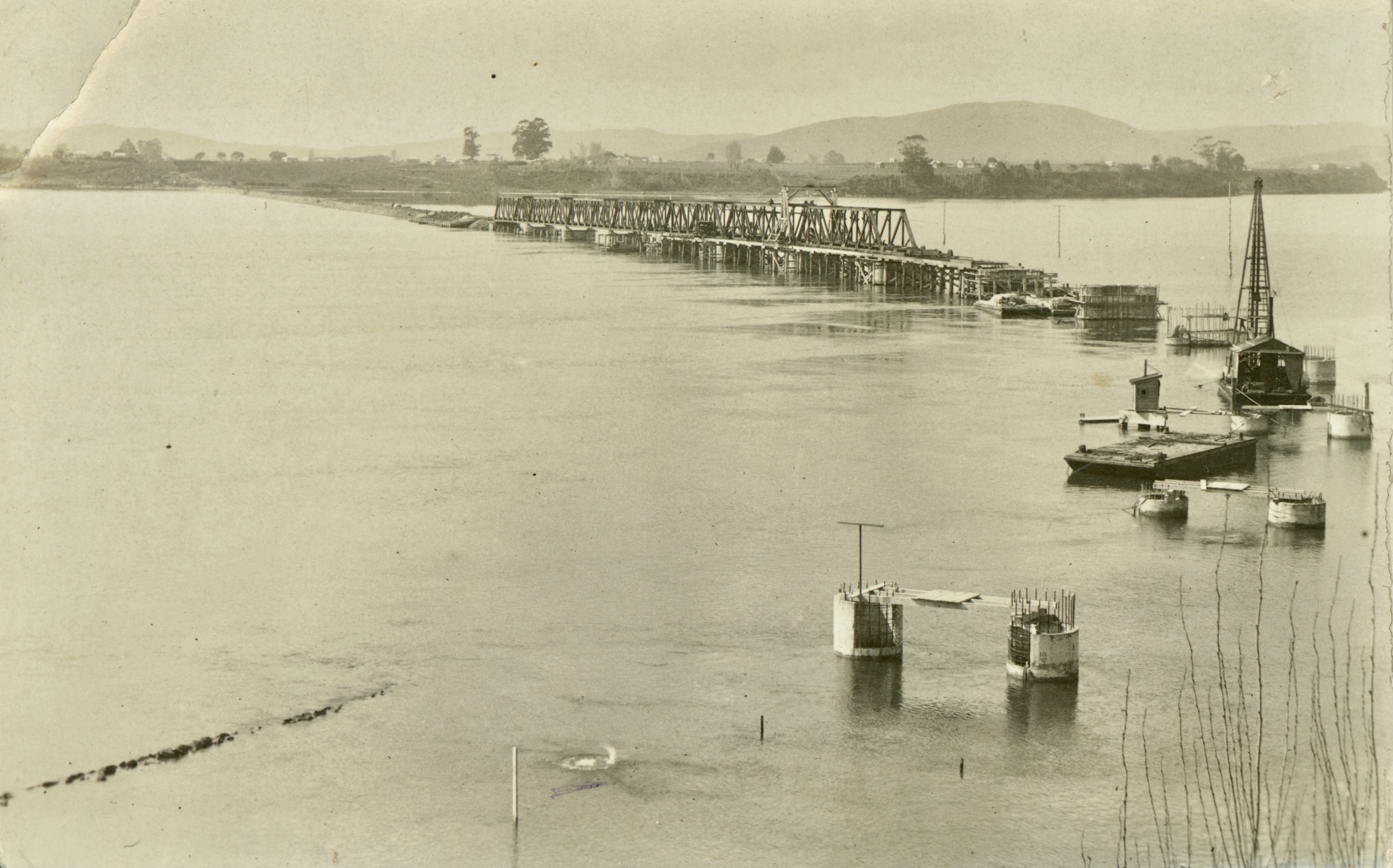
Matapihi Railway Bridge 1920s

== Matapihi Railway Bridge ==
Tauranga Harbour Bridge, now known as Matapihi Railway Bridge, No.71, is 461.49 m (1,514.1 ft) long. It spans the Waimapu Estuary on 14 × 85 ton spans of 105 ft (32 m), with 250,628 rivets, the last being ceremoniously driven in on 25 February 1924. It rests on 15 cylinders, of 25 ft (7.6 m) to 110 ft (34 m). The east end is straight, transitioning to a 12 ch (240 m) curve. At its highest point the bridge is 12 ft (3.7 m) above high water mark. Nearly 3,000 yd^{3} (2,300 m^{3}) of concrete and 100 tons of steel were used in the piers and abutments and 1,200 tons of steel in the girders. A warm water spring was found in construction. The first pier had been built by 1916. In 1918 The New Zealand Herald questioned whether delays were due to wartime steel shortages, or money saving. It was not until Sunday, 1 June 1924 that the bridge opened. The alternative road route between Tauranga and Matapihi was about 16 mi (26 km) long, but a walkway was deemed too expensive, until, in 1958 it was decided to attach a walkway to the bridge, as 30 people had died by falling from it, or being hit by trains.
