= Judea, New Zealand =

Suburb of Tauranga, New Zealand

Judea
- Suburb
- Interactive map of Judea
- Coordinates: 37.697°S 176.134°E
- Country: New Zealand
- City: Tauranga
- Local authority: Tauranga City Council
- Electoral ward: Bethlehem General Ward

Area
  - Land: 260 ha (640 acres)

Population (June 2025)
  - Total: 4,740
  - Density: 1,800/km^{2} (4,700/sq mi)

Bellevue	Brookfield	(Waikareao Estuary)
Bethlehem	Judea
	Gate Pa	Tauranga South

Judea is a suburb of Tauranga in the Bay of Plenty region of New Zealand's North Island. It is located on State Highway 2, east of Bethlehem.

The suburb was established as a European fortified settlement in 1864, as part of an offensive against local Māori during the New Zealand Wars. India Rebout, later as the Judea Redoubt and Huria Redoubt, was one of three fortified European forts in Tauranga.

== Demographics ==
Judea covers 2.60 km^{2} (1.00 sq mi) and had an estimated population of 4,740 as of June 2025, with a population density of 1,823 people per km^{2}.

Historical population
Year	Pop.	±% p.a.
2006	3,852	—
2013	4,008	+0.57%
2018	4,467	+2.19%
2023	4,635	+0.74%

Judea had a population of 4,635 in the 2023 New Zealand census, an increase of 168 people (3.8%) since the 2018 census, and an increase of 627 people (15.6%) since the 2013 census. There were 2,202 males, 2,415 females, and 18 people of other genders in 1,677 dwellings. 3.0% of people identified as LGBTIQ+. There were 882 people (19.0%) aged under 15 years, 831 (17.9%) aged 15 to 29, 2,103 (45.4%) aged 30 to 64, and 822 (17.7%) aged 65 or older.

People could identify as more than one ethnicity. The results were 74.5% European (Pākehā); 25.4% Māori; 5.2% Pasifika; 10.6% Asian; 1.7% Middle Eastern, Latin American and African New Zealanders (MELAA); and 1.4% other, which includes people giving their ethnicity as "New Zealander". English was spoken by 96.5%, Māori by 6.9%, Samoan by 0.8%, and other languages by 10.7%. No language could be spoken by 1.7% (e.g. too young to talk). New Zealand Sign Language was known by 0.8%. The percentage of people born overseas was 21.5, compared with 28.8% nationally.

Religious affiliations were 30.4% Christian, 1.7% Hindu, 0.6% Islam, 2.5% Māori religious beliefs, 1.0% Buddhist, 0.5% New Age, and 3.4% other religions. People who answered that they had no religion were 52.4%, and 8.2% of people did not answer the census question.

Of those at least 15 years old, 747 (19.9%) people had a bachelor's or higher degree, 2,082 (55.5%) had a post-high school certificate or diploma, and 921 (24.5%) people exclusively held high school qualifications. 276 people (7.4%) earned over $100,000 compared to 12.1% nationally. The employment status of those at least 15 was 1,887 (50.3%) full-time, 501 (13.3%) part-time, and 129 (3.4%) unemployed.

Individual statistical areas
Name	Area (km^{2})	Population	Density (per km^{2})	Dwellings	Median age	Median income
Judea	0.88	2,691	3,058	1,038	39.8 years	$38,600
Te Reti	1.72	1,944	1,944	639	37.0 years	$40,900
New Zealand					38.1 years	$41,500

== Marae ==
The local Huria Marae and Tamatea Pokaiwhenua meeting house is a tribal meeting place of the Ngāti Ranginui hapū of Ngāi Tamarawaho.
