= Brookfield, New Zealand =

Suburb of Tauranga, New Zealand

Brookfield
- Suburb
- Interactive map of Brookfield
- Coordinates: 37.690325°S 176.135607°E
- Country: New Zealand
- City: Tauranga
- Local authority: Tauranga City Council
- Electoral ward: Matua-Otūmoetai General Ward; Bethlehem General Ward

Area
  - Land: 238 ha (590 acres)

Population (June 2025)
  - Total: 6,270
  - Density: 2,630/km^{2} (6,820/sq mi)

Bellevue	Otūmoetai
Bethlehem	Brookfield	(Waikareao Estuary)
	Judea

Brookfield is a suburb of Tauranga, in the Bay of Plenty Region of New Zealand's North Island.

== Demographics ==
Brookfield covers 2.38 km^{2} (0.92 sq mi) and had an estimated population of 6,270 as of June 2025, with a population density of 2,634 people per km^{2}.

Historical population
Year	Pop.	±% p.a.
2006	4,950	—
2013	5,151	+0.57%
2018	5,754	+2.24%
2023	6,024	+0.92%

Brookfield had a population of 6,024 in the 2023 New Zealand census, an increase of 270 people (4.7%) since the 2018 census, and an increase of 873 people (16.9%) since the 2013 census. There were 2,958 males, 3,045 females, and 21 people of other genders in 2,139 dwellings. 3.0% of people identified as LGBTIQ+. The median age was 34.8 years (compared with 38.1 years nationally). There were 1,311 people (21.8%) aged under 15 years, 1,197 (19.9%) aged 15 to 29, 2,664 (44.2%) aged 30 to 64, and 849 (14.1%) aged 65 or older.

People could identify as more than one ethnicity. The results were 77.1% European (Pākehā); 22.9% Māori; 4.5% Pasifika; 11.1% Asian; 1.2% Middle Eastern, Latin American and African New Zealanders (MELAA); and 1.8% other, which includes people giving their ethnicity as "New Zealander". English was spoken by 95.8%, Māori by 6.3%, Samoan by 0.4%, and other languages by 12.2%. No language could be spoken by 2.5% (e.g. too young to talk). New Zealand Sign Language was known by 0.4%. The percentage of people born overseas was 23.1, compared with 28.8% nationally.

Religious affiliations were 28.8% Christian, 1.4% Hindu, 0.6% Islam, 2.0% Māori religious beliefs, 0.8% Buddhist, 0.3% New Age, and 3.3% other religions. People who answered that they had no religion were 55.3%, and 7.5% of people did not answer the census question.

Of those at least 15 years old, 1,101 (23.4%) people had a bachelor's or higher degree, 2,550 (54.1%) had a post-high school certificate or diploma, and 1,059 (22.5%) people exclusively held high school qualifications. The median income was $43,000, compared with $41,500 nationally. 411 people (8.7%) earned over $100,000 compared to 12.1% nationally. The employment status of those at least 15 was 2,553 (54.2%) full-time, 636 (13.5%) part-time, and 150 (3.2%) unemployed.

Individual statistical areas
Name	Area (km^{2})	Population	Density (per km^{2})	Dwellings	Median age	Median income
Brookfield West	1.06	3,129	2,952	1,128	34.4 years	$41,600
Brookfield East	1.32	2,895	2,193	1,011	35.3 years	$44,800
New Zealand					38.1 years	$41,500

== Education ==
Te Kura o Manunui is a co-educational state primary school for Year 1 to 6 students, with a roll of 313 as of July 2025. Previously named Brookfield School, it was rebuilt on a new site and renamed at the beginning of 2023. The school offers full-immersion Māori language classes and bilingual classes.
