= Mountain Rimu Timber Company =

Coordinates: 38.095278°S 176.078611°E

Mountain Rimu Timber Company tramway
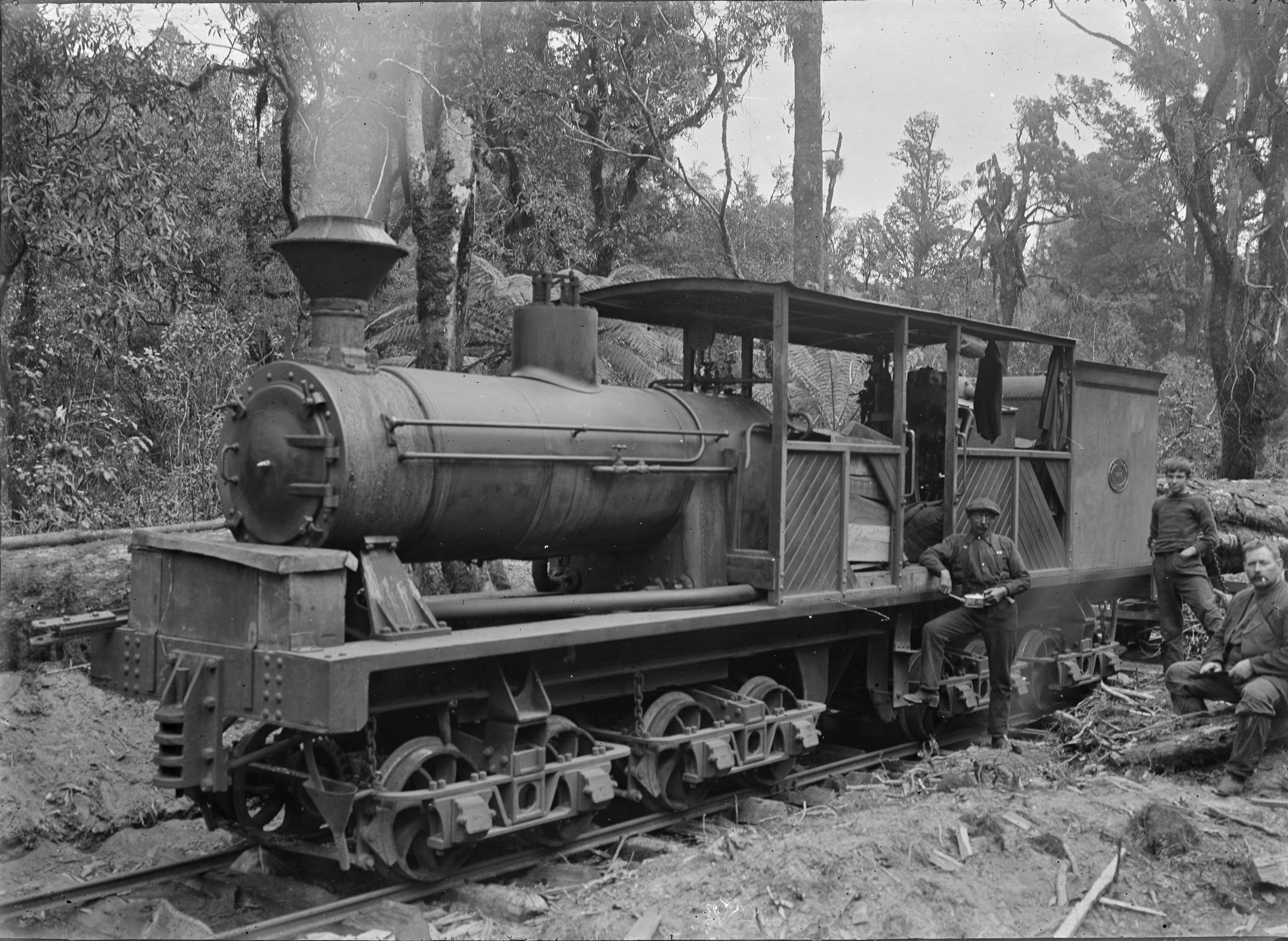
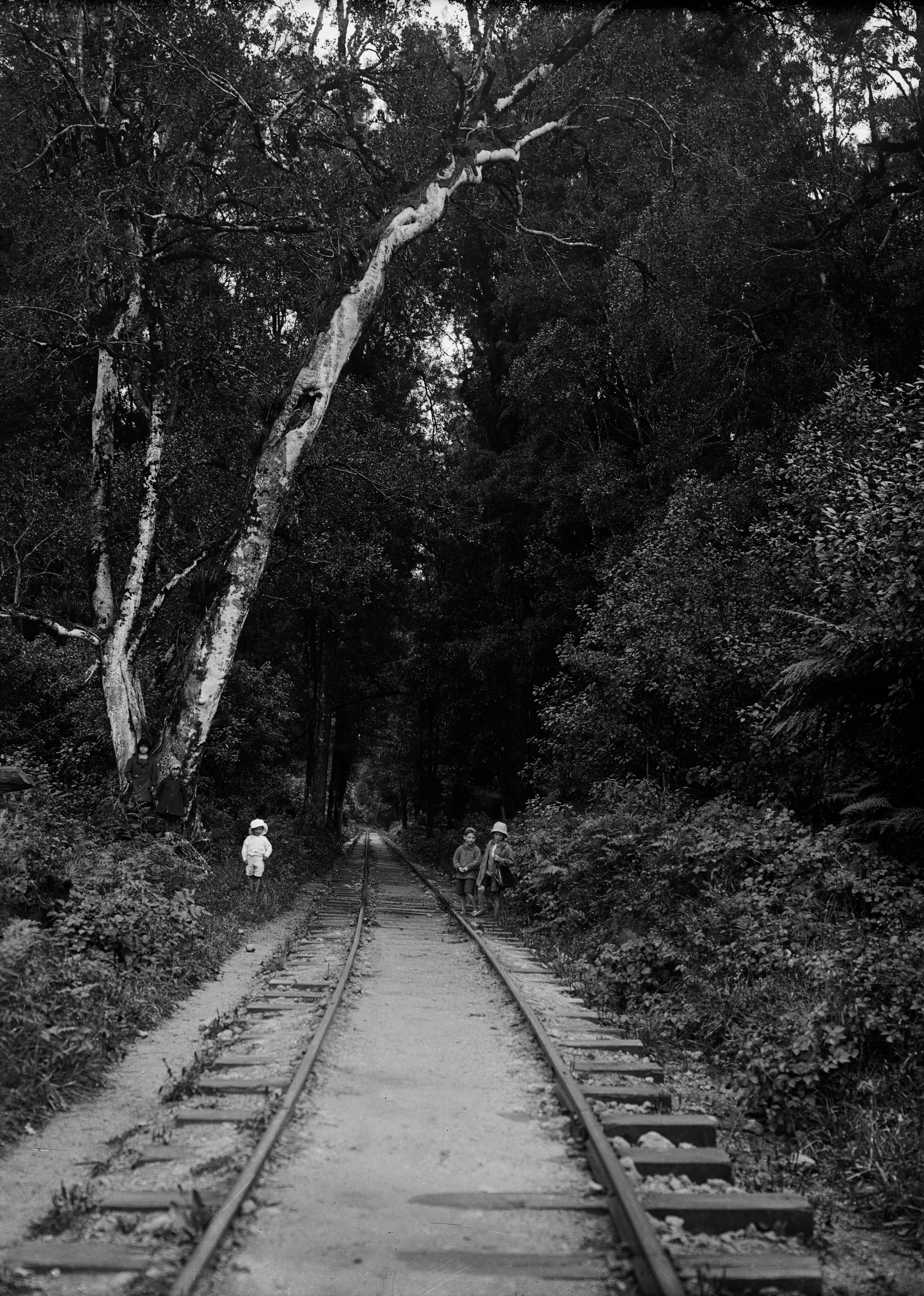
- Price 16-wheeler Bush tramline in the Mamaku bush, 1923

Technical
- Track gauge: 3 1/2 feet (1,067 mm)

The Mountain Rimu Timber Company owned and operated a bush tramway near Mamaku, south of the Kaimai Range near Rotorua in the Bay of Plenty Region of the North Island of New Zealand. The tramway, with a track gauge of 3 1/2 feet (1,067 mm), was used from approximately 1898, to at least 1935.

== History ==
Mountain Rimu Timber Company Limited was incorporated on the 24 January 1898 to purchase the mills of Messrs Kusabs Brothers. It owned 4000 acres of rimu bush. The mills and the head office were situated about 3 1/2 miles (5.6 km) from the railway station, with which it was connected to by the tramway. The machinery was driven by a twenty-five horsepower stationary steam engine. There were a full sawing and planing plant, capable of turning out 12,000 feet (3,700 m) of sawn and dressed timber daily. A market for the timber was found throughout the Auckland District, and a good deal was exported to Australia. A large quantity of firewood was cut and shipped to Rotorua.

New Zealand Railways (NZR) concluded around 1924-26 that it would be advantageous to supply its own sawn timber, and thus purchased the mill. On 31 August 1934, the sawmill closed down, and its employees were made redundant. The reason was that the timber could be obtained more cheaply elsewhere. The NZR Railway Board had called tenders for timber, and found that it was able to get it at a materially lower price than was being paid for it from its own mill at Mamaku.

At that time there were 27,000,000 feet (8,200,000 m) of timber left. There was a steel tramline constructed right into the bush, and there were facilities, which no other mill possessed. The plant was close to the railway line on the top of the Mamaku divide, with the easiest hauling conditions. There were two log haulers, two miles of wire rope, two locomotives, one of which has only recently been placed there, and twenty-six cottages from which revenue to the extent of £5oo a year in the shape of rentals was drawn.

== Locomotives ==
- A & G Price 16-wheeler, built 1913, 0-4-4-4-4-0, 1913-1916 Mountain Rimu Timber Co., Mamaku
- A & G Price Type D 16-wheeler, built 1910, 1910-1916 Mountain Rimu Timber Co. Mamaku
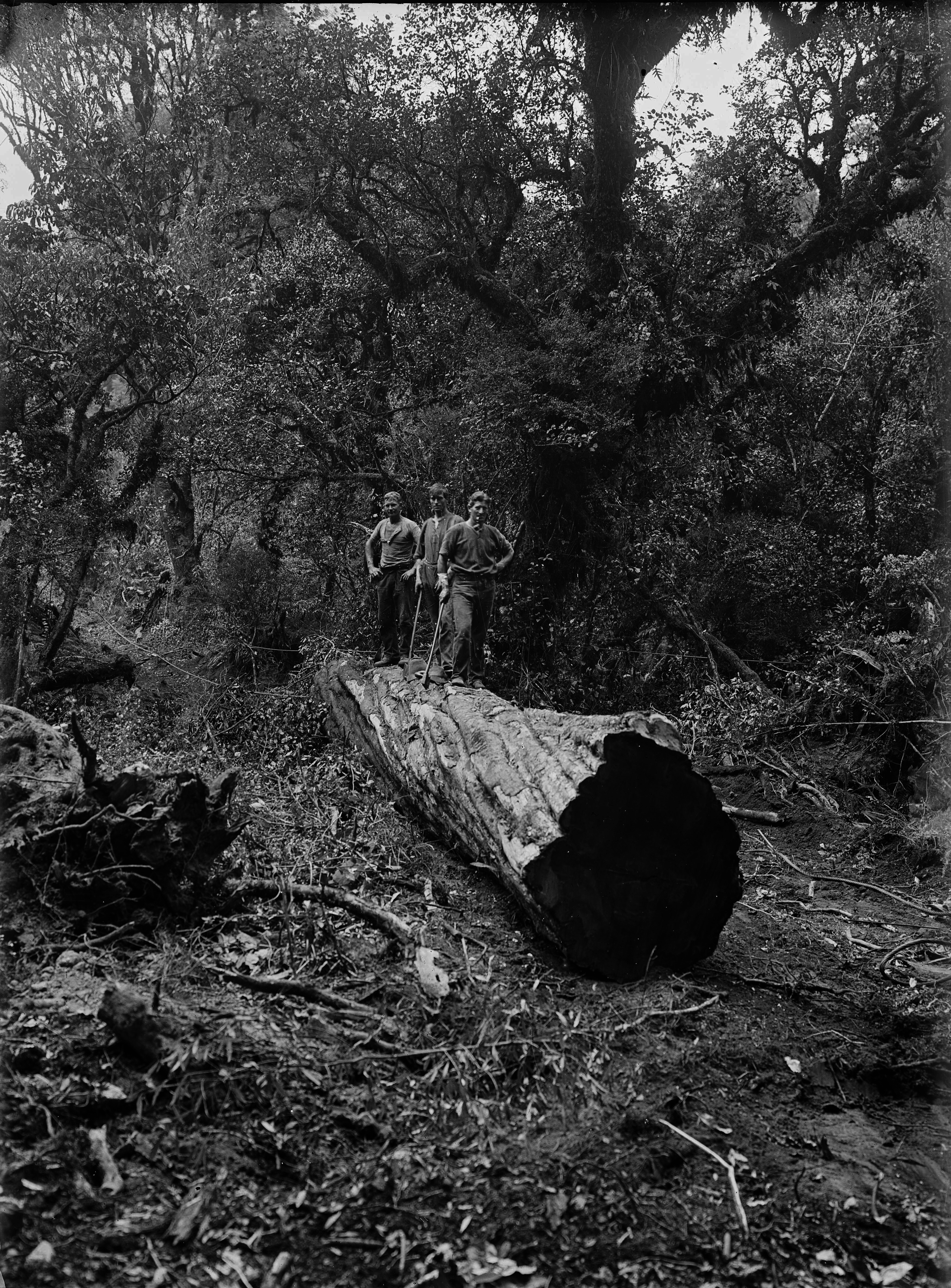
Timber workers on a log on the Mountain Rimu Timber Company's property

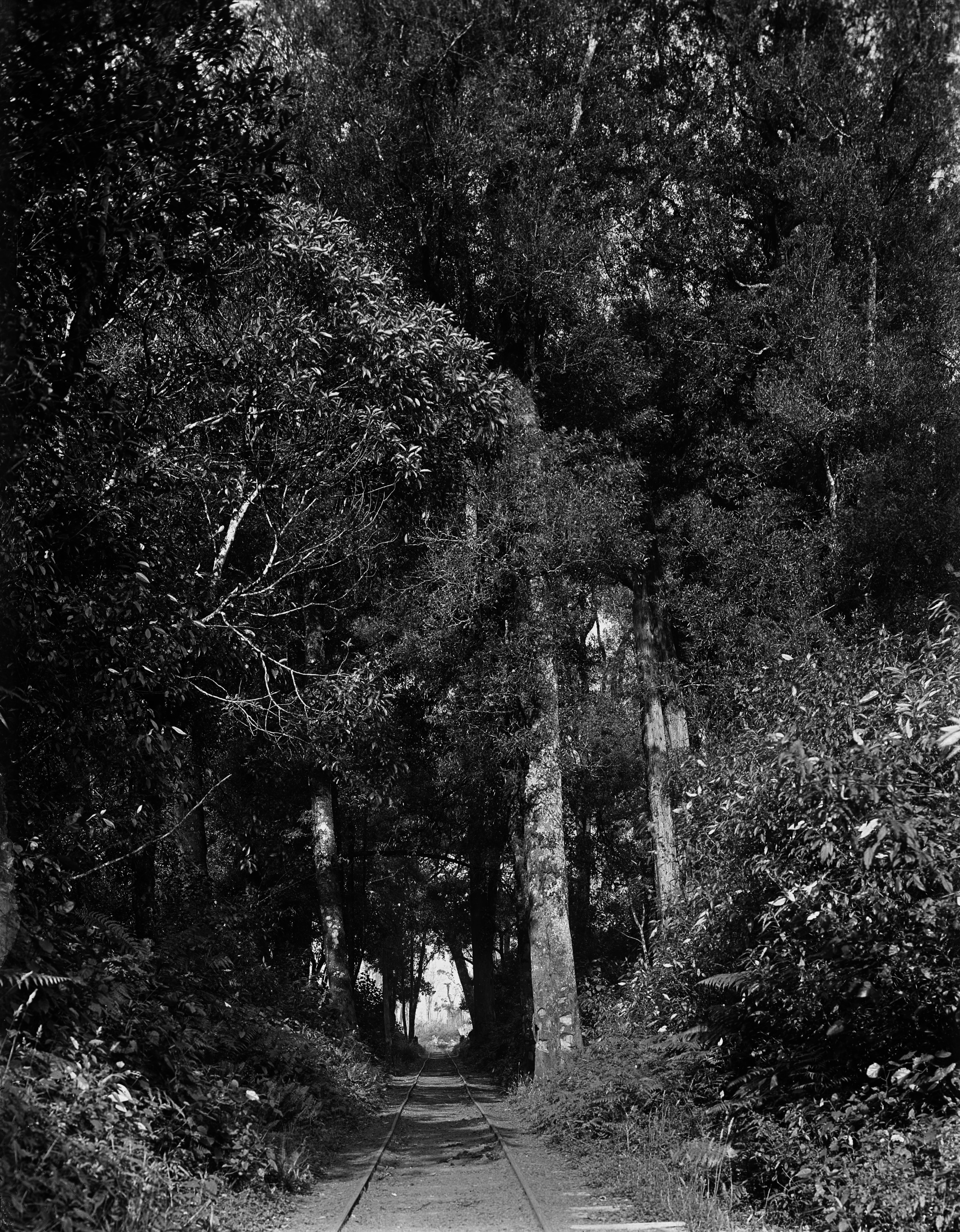
Railway track in native bush on the Mountain Rimu Timber Company's property

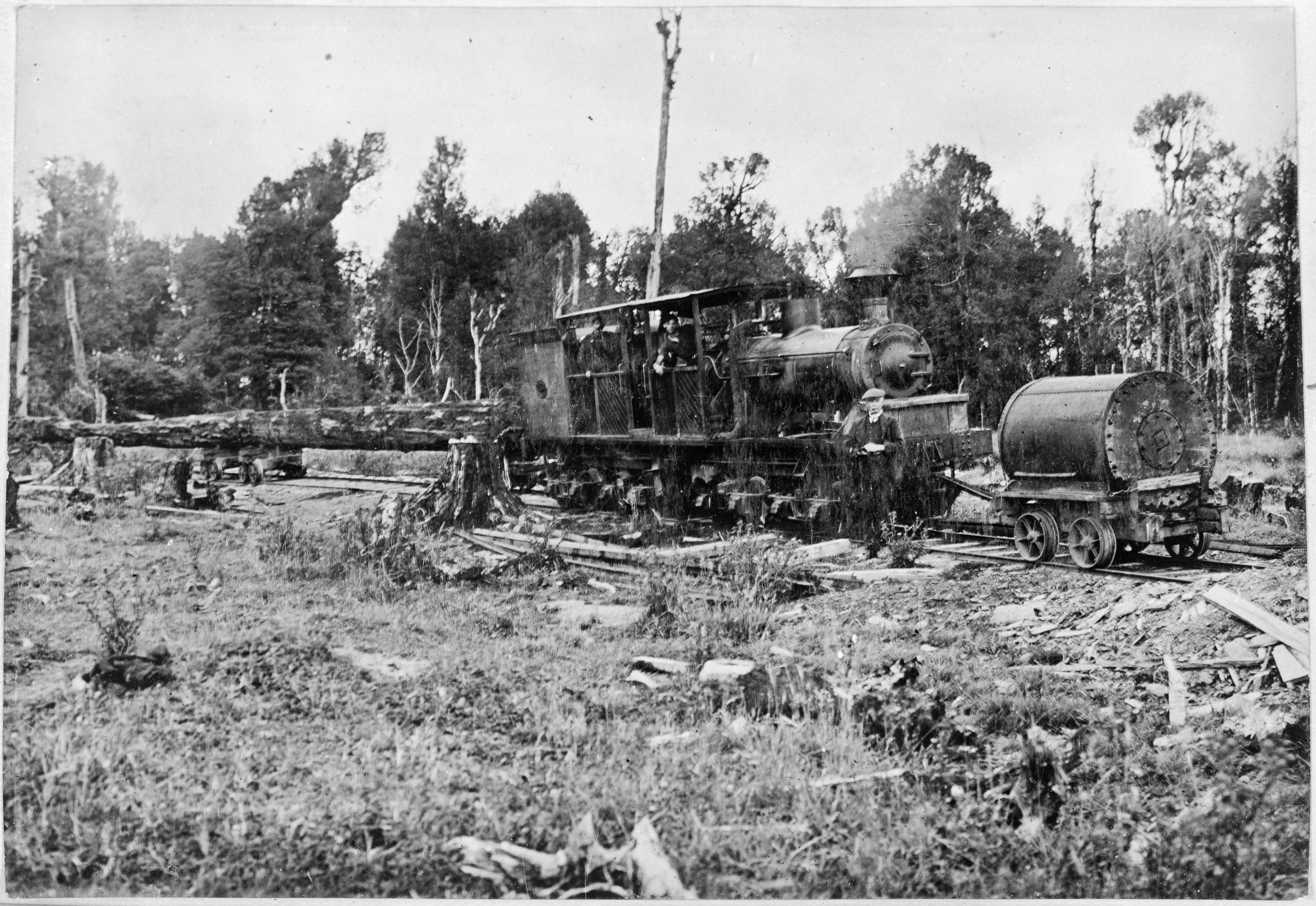
Price 16-wheeler steam locomotive

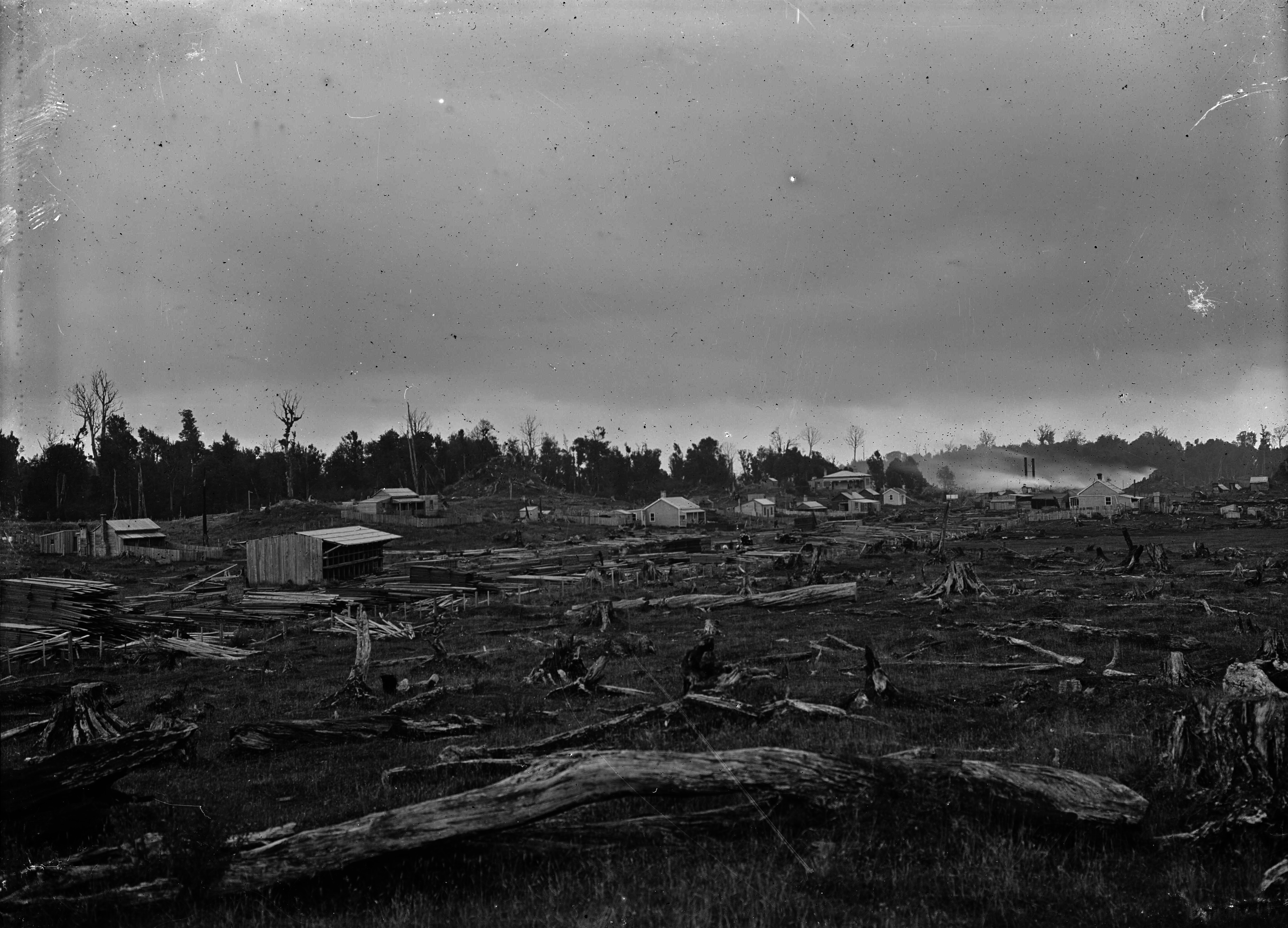
Timber milling township of Mamaku, looking towards the Mountain Rimu Timber Co. mill

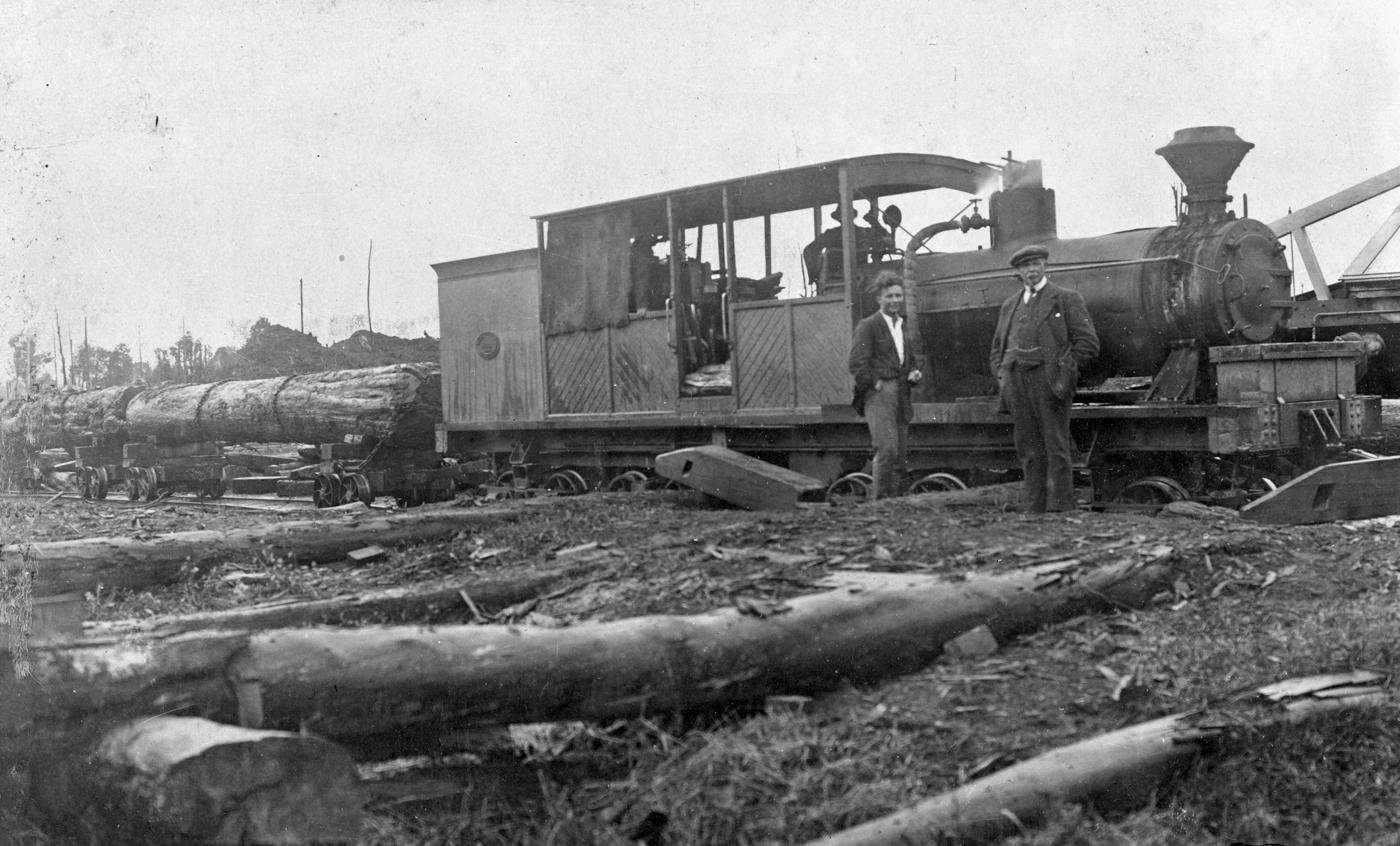
Johnston Loco, Price 16-wheeler steam locomotive with a load of logs
