= Otumoetai School =

Ōtūmoetai Primary School

Location
- 236 Otumoetai Road, Otūmoetai, Tauranga, New Zealand; 37.6826°S 176.1353°E

Information
- Type: State, Co-educational, Primary
- Motto: U ana te ako - Actively Involved Learners
- Established: 1895
- Ministry of Education Institution no.: 1879
- Principal: Zara McIndoe
- Enrolment: 559 (July 2026)
- Socio-economic decile: 6
- Website: ops.school.nz

Ōtūmoetai School (More commonly known as Ōtūmoetai Primary School) is a school in the city of Tauranga, in northern New Zealand. The school was opened in 1895, and was the first to open in the area. The current principal is Zara McIndoe (2019- ) and the school had 513 students in 2007.
