= Bethlehem, New Zealand =

Suburb of Tauranga, New Zealand

Bethlehem Peterehema (Māori)
- Suburb
- Interactive map of Bethlehem
- Coordinates: 37°42′S 176°07′E
- Country: New Zealand
- Region: Bay of Plenty
- City: Tauranga
- Local authority: Tauranga City Council
- Electoral ward: Bethlehem General Ward

Area
  - Land: 1,386 ha (3,420 acres)

Population (June 2025)
  - Total: 9,250
  - Density: 667/km^{2} (1,730/sq mi)

| | (Tauranga Harbour) | Bellevue |
| Te Puna | Bethlehem | Judea |
| | Tauriko | Gate Pa |

Bethlehem (Māori: Peterehema, pronounced [ˌpɛ.tɛ.ɾɛ.ˈhɛ.ma]) is a suburb of Tauranga in New Zealand's North Island. Originally a small independent town, it has now been absorbed by Tauranga and comprises a number of subdivisions including Bethlehem Heights, Sterling Gate, La Cumbre, Saint Andrews, and Mayfield.

== Demographics ==
Bethlehem covers 13.86 km^{2} (5.35 sq mi) and had an estimated population of 9,250 as of June 2025, with a population density of 667 people per km^{2}.

Historical population
| Year | Pop. | ±% p.a. |
|---|---|---|
| 2006 | 5,556 | — |
| 2013 | 7,050 | +3.46% |
| 2018 | 8,634 | +4.14% |
| 2023 | 9,156 | +1.18% |

Bethlehem had a population of 9,156 in the 2023 New Zealand census, an increase of 522 people (6.0%) since the 2018 census, and an increase of 2,106 people (29.9%) since the 2013 census. There were 4,293 males, 4,842 females, and 18 people of other genders in 3,582 dwellings. 1.8% of people identified as LGBTIQ+. There were 1,362 people (14.9%) aged under 15 years, 1,149 (12.5%) aged 15 to 29, 3,426 (37.4%) aged 30 to 64, and 3,216 (35.1%) aged 65 or older.

People could identify as more than one ethnicity. The results were 84.2% European (Pākehā); 10.3% Māori; 1.5% Pasifika; 10.2% Asian; 0.6% Middle Eastern, Latin American and African New Zealanders (MELAA); and 2.2% other, which includes people giving their ethnicity as "New Zealander". English was spoken by 97.1%, Māori by 3.1%, Samoan by 0.1%, and other languages by 13.3%. No language could be spoken by 0.9% (e.g. too young to talk). New Zealand Sign Language was known by 0.2%. The percentage of people born overseas was 27.9, compared with 28.8% nationally.

Religious affiliations were 45.6% Christian, 0.8% Hindu, 0.3% Islam, 0.9% Māori religious beliefs, 0.8% Buddhist, 0.2% New Age, and 1.7% other religions. People who answered that they had no religion were 42.9%, and 7.0% of people did not answer the census question.

Of those at least 15 years old, 1,971 (25.3%) people had a bachelor's or higher degree, 4,029 (51.7%) had a post-high school certificate or diploma, and 1,800 (23.1%) people exclusively held high school qualifications. 1,044 people (13.4%) earned over $100,000 compared to 12.1% nationally. The employment status of those at least 15 was 2,901 (37.2%) full-time, 1,113 (14.3%) part-time, and 138 (1.8%) unemployed.

Individual statistical areas
| Name | Area (km^{2}) | Population | Density (per km^{2}) | Dwellings | Median age | Median income |
|---|---|---|---|---|---|---|
| Bethlehem North | 5.12 | 3,645 | 712 | 1,542 | 63.1 years | $33,700 |
| Bethlehem Central | 4.27 | 4,392 | 1,029 | 1,680 | 49.1 years | $40,000 |
| Bethlehem South | 4.47 | 1,119 | 1,119 | 360 | 45.2 years | $52,400 |
| New Zealand | | | | | 38.1 years | $41,500 |

== Marae ==
Bethlehem has two Ngāti Ranginui marae:

- Hangarau or Peterehema Marae and its Hangarau is affiliated with Ngāti Hangarau.
- Te Wairoa Marae and its Kahu Tapu meeting house are affiliated with Ngāti Kahu, Ngāti Pango and Ngāti Rangi.

== Economy ==
=== Bethlehem Town Centre ===
Bethlehem Town Centre is a shopping area covering 20,000 m². It has 1000 carparks and about 50 retailers, including Kmart, Woolworths, and Smiths City.

== Education ==
=== Bethlehem Campus ===
The local Bethlehem Campus includes several Christian educational institutions on a single site.

Bethlehem College is a co-educational state-integrated school for Year 1 to 13 students with a roll of 2,097 as of March 2026.

In March of 1988, construction of the school began. The first classroom building - ‘A’ block - was built on the 10th of March. Bethlehem college was initially an independent private school, becoming a state-integrated school in 1999.

In January 2013 a van of Bethlehem College students and former students crashed in a small village in Kenya, while they were on a volunteer mission at Ark Quest Academy. Student Caitlin Dickson was killed, as were married couple Brian and Grace Johnston. Kenyan bus driver Christopher Mmata was also killed.

In 2022 Bethlehem College received considerable media attention when it was revealed that the school contract had a clause in it which made parents and their children agree that marriage is between a man and a woman. Allegations of homophobic bullying within the school came to light following this, resulting in a petition for the Education Review Office and the Ministry of Education to investigate the school, launched by Shaneel Lal.

Bethlehem Tertiary Institute, formerly the Bethlehem Institute of Education, is a tertiary institution offering Degrees and Diplomas in teaching, social work and counselling and a Master of Professional Practice. Over 400 students are enrolled and students may study either onsite with a 'flipped classroom' approach or through innovative distance learning. The academy was founded in 1988 as a primary school with 100 students, and has expanded since to offer secondary and tertiary education.

Notable former students include Kiri Allan (Member of Parliament), David Farrier (journalist and actor), Michael Ashton (makeup artist), Sam Tanner (1500m athlete) and Mika Vukona (professional basketball player).

=== Other schools ===
Bethlehem has three other schools.

Bethlehem School is a state primary school, with a roll of 399. The school opened as a native school in 1883.

Tauranga Adventist School is a state-integrated Seventh-day Adventist primary school, with a roll of 111. It opened in 1974.

Te Wharekura o Mauao is a state secondary school, with a roll of 289. It opened in 2010.

All these schools are co-educational. Rolls are as of March 2026.
