= Bellevue, New Zealand =

Suburb of Tauranga, New Zealand

Bellevue
- Suburb
- Interactive map of Bellevue
- Coordinates: 37.682254°S 176.128501°E
- Country: New Zealand
- City: Tauranga
- Local authority: Tauranga City Council
- Electoral ward: Matua-Otūmoetai General Ward

Area
  - Land: 172 ha (430 acres)

Population (June 2025)
  - Total: 3,990
  - Density: 2,320/km^{2} (6,010/sq mi)

| (Tauranga Harbour) | Matua | Otūmoetai |
| | Bellevue |
| Bethlehem | Brookfield |

Bellevue is a suburb of Tauranga, in the Bay of Plenty Region of New Zealand's North Island.

Bellevue has an athletics club which takes part in national championships.

A woman fired a gun in the suburb in March 2019, sparking a lockdown of local schools.

Two girls were held hostage by their father in their Bellevue home in November 2019, before Police shot the father.

== Demographics ==
Bellevue covers 1.72 km^{2} (0.66 sq mi) and had an estimated population of 3,990 as of June 2025, with a population density of 2,320 people per km^{2}.

Historical population
| Year | Pop. | ±% p.a. |
|---|---|---|
| 2006 | 3,399 | — |
| 2013 | 3,537 | +0.57% |
| 2018 | 3,807 | +1.48% |
| 2023 | 3,852 | +0.24% |

Bellevue had a population of 3,852 in the 2023 New Zealand census, an increase of 45 people (1.2%) since the 2018 census, and an increase of 315 people (8.9%) since the 2013 census. There were 1,848 males, 1,986 females, and 15 people of other genders in 1,305 dwellings. 2.5% of people identified as LGBTIQ+. The median age was 34.4 years (compared with 38.1 years nationally). There were 849 people (22.0%) aged under 15 years, 795 (20.6%) aged 15 to 29, 1,794 (46.6%) aged 30 to 64, and 414 (10.7%) aged 65 or older.

People could identify as more than one ethnicity. The results were 81.2% European (Pākehā); 20.2% Māori; 3.8% Pasifika; 9.7% Asian; 1.0% Middle Eastern, Latin American and African New Zealanders (MELAA); and 2.8% other, which includes people giving their ethnicity as "New Zealander". English was spoken by 96.0%, Māori by 3.7%, Samoan by 0.2%, and other languages by 12.4%. No language could be spoken by 2.9% (e.g. too young to talk). New Zealand Sign Language was known by 0.5%. The percentage of people born overseas was 24.0, compared with 28.8% nationally.

Religious affiliations were 28.3% Christian, 0.8% Hindu, 0.2% Islam, 1.1% Māori religious beliefs, 0.5% Buddhist, 0.3% New Age, and 3.1% other religions. People who answered that they had no religion were 58.9%, and 6.7% of people did not answer the census question.

Of those at least 15 years old, 723 (24.1%) people had a bachelor's or higher degree, 1,638 (54.5%) had a post-high school certificate or diploma, and 642 (21.4%) people exclusively held high school qualifications. The median income was $45,900, compared with $41,500 nationally. 300 people (10.0%) earned over $100,000 compared to 12.1% nationally. The employment status of those at least 15 was 1,665 (55.4%) full-time, 429 (14.3%) part-time, and 81 (2.7%) unemployed.

== Education ==
Bellevue School is a state primary school, with a roll of 291. It opened in 1972 and incorporated Montessori education from 2002.

Ōtūmoetai Intermediate is a state intermediate school, with a roll of 949. It opened in 1966.

Ōtūmoetai College is a state secondary school with a roll of 2,002. It was established in 1965.

All these schools are co-educational. Rolls are as of July 2026.
