= Otūmoetai =

Suburb of Tauranga, New Zealand

- Suburb
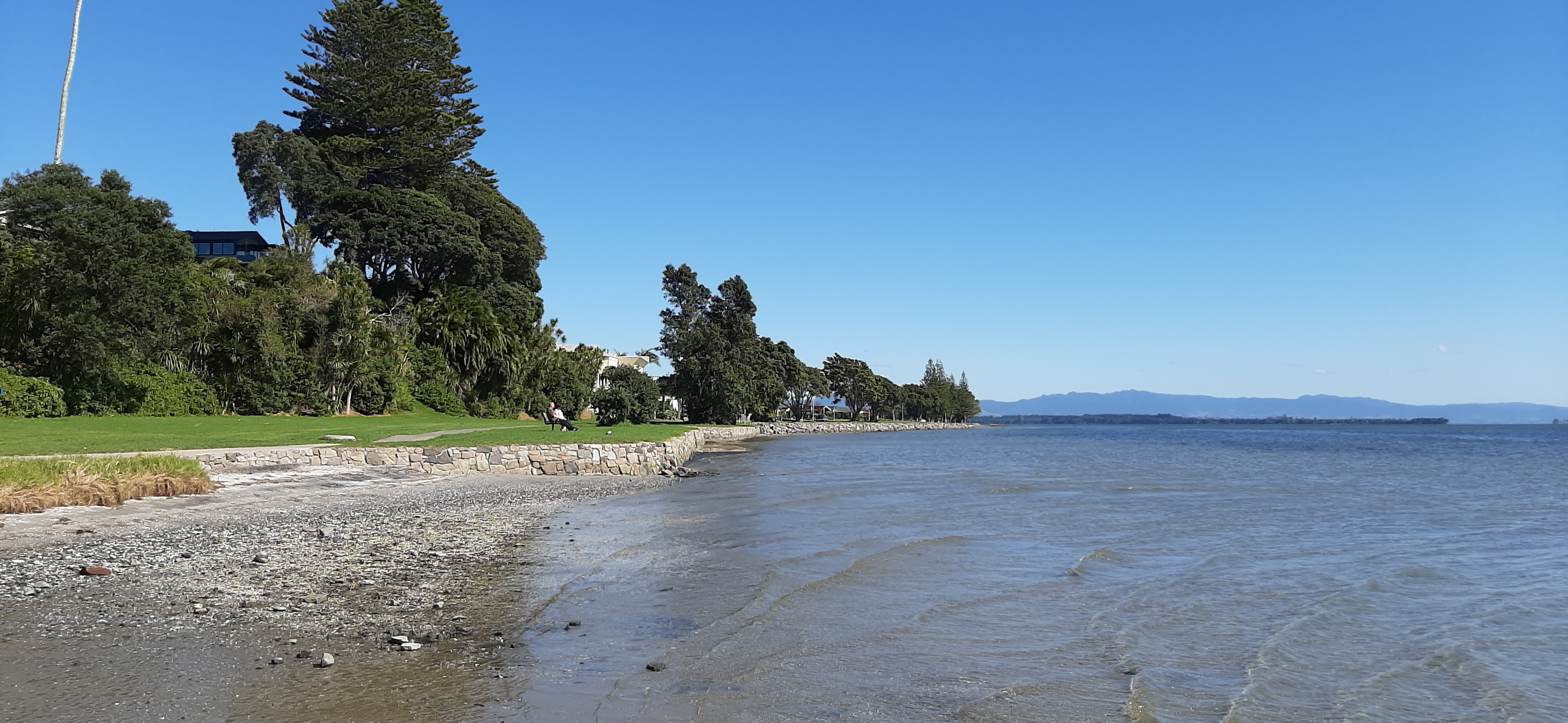
- Otūmoetai Beach
- Interactive map of Otūmoetai
- Coordinates: 37°40′S 176°09′E
- Country: New Zealand
- City: Tauranga
- Local authority: Tauranga City Council
- Electoral ward: Matua-Otūmoetai General Ward

Area
  - Land: 332 ha (820 acres)

Population (June 2025)
  - Total: 8,490
  - Density: 2,560/km^{2} (6,620/sq mi)

Matua	(Tauranga Harbour)
Bellevue	Otūmoetai	Tauranga Central
	Brookfield	(Waikareao Estuary)

Otūmoetai is a suburb of Tauranga in the Bay of Plenty region of New Zealand.

The Otūmoetai peninsula includes both the Otūmoetai suburb, and the neighbouring suburbs of Matua and Bellevue.

== History ==
The name is claimed to translate to "Peaceful Waters" from Māori to English, as the Matua Saltmarsh and Tauranga Harbour borders Otūmoetai. The New Zealand Ministry for Culture and Heritage gives a translation of "place where the tide stands still as if asleep" for Ōtūmoetai.

Before the 1950s, Otūmoetai was largely orchards and farms but then houses started to be built in Brookfield, Otūmoetai Central and Pillans Point. Following this the suburb started to take shape and in the 1990s the last pieces of land left in the suburb were developed into housing.

In the 21st century, the suburb has gone through intensification with the building of apartments.

=== Railway station ===
Otūmoetai had a flag station on the East Coast Main Trunk from December 1917 to 15 September 1974 New Zealand Railways (NZR) took over from the Public Works Department (PWD) on 18 June 1928. The station had a shelter shed, cart approach, a 30 ft (9.1 m) by 20 ft (6.1 m) goods shed, cattle and sheep yards, and a loading bank. On 16 October 1940 a ballast train ran into a passenger train. One passenger had a cut thumb and some wagons were derailed.

A 1920 note said there was a station yard and accommodation, but many of the builders were dismissed in 1921 to save money, so it wasn't until 1924 when tenders were invited and 1925 when the Waikareao Estuary was bridged, linking Otūmoetai to Tauranga. In 1925 Otūmoetai Station yard was excavated by steam shovel, and the spoil used to reclaim an area behind Tauranga Wharf. North of the line stockyards, loading and unloading races and a grazing area were formed. A 17 wagon siding, parallel with the main line, allowed stock to be loaded. New Zealand Railways took over the Tahawai-Tauranga Section from PWD on 18 June 1928. By late November 1928 a shelter shed was built about 150m from the Otūmoetai Road bridqe. The timetable varied slightly over the years; it took just a few minutes for trains to reach Tauranga. A 2pm mixed train for Frankton was used to post letters in the guard's van and send grapefruit and flowers to Wellington on the Limited Express, which left Frankton at 9.29pm Passengers from Tauranga and Otūmoetai on the Tāneatua Express could connect with the 3pm Express from Auckland, which arrived at Frankton at 5.40pm. In 1944 coal shortages reduced this to 3 days a week and by December 1951, due to staff shortages, twice a week. A siding and loading bank were added in 1945 and the stockyards improved. Floodlighting was requested because stock from often arrived as late as midnight. By 1945 loading and unloading of livestock was moved from Tauranga to Otūmoetai. A staff building came from Parawai in 1952. At the end of March 1973, no livestock had been moved in or out of Otūmoetai n the previous 12 months, after deregulation allowed long distance road transport. By 1 July 1974 the yards had been sold and removed. In November the shelter shed was sold to Tauranga Historic Village Museum, but replaced with a replica due to its poor condition. From 1959 to 1967 railcars ran between Te Puke and Auckland.

==== Waikareao Estuary bridge ====
The Waikareao Estuary is bridged by 19 x 25 ft (7.6 m) steel plate girders, resting on 20 reinforced concrete piers. Bridge 66 is 147.47 m (483.8 ft) long. Just to the east of it a triangular junction serves Tauranga container terminal, at Sulphur Point, and there is a passing loop from there to the 98km post, immediately north of Strand station.

Preceding station	Historical railways	Following station
Te Puna; Line open, station closed 5.42 km (3.37 mi); Towards Hamilton	East Coast Main Trunk; New Zealand Railways Department	Tauranga; Line open, station closed 2.97 km (1.85 mi); Towards Tāneatua

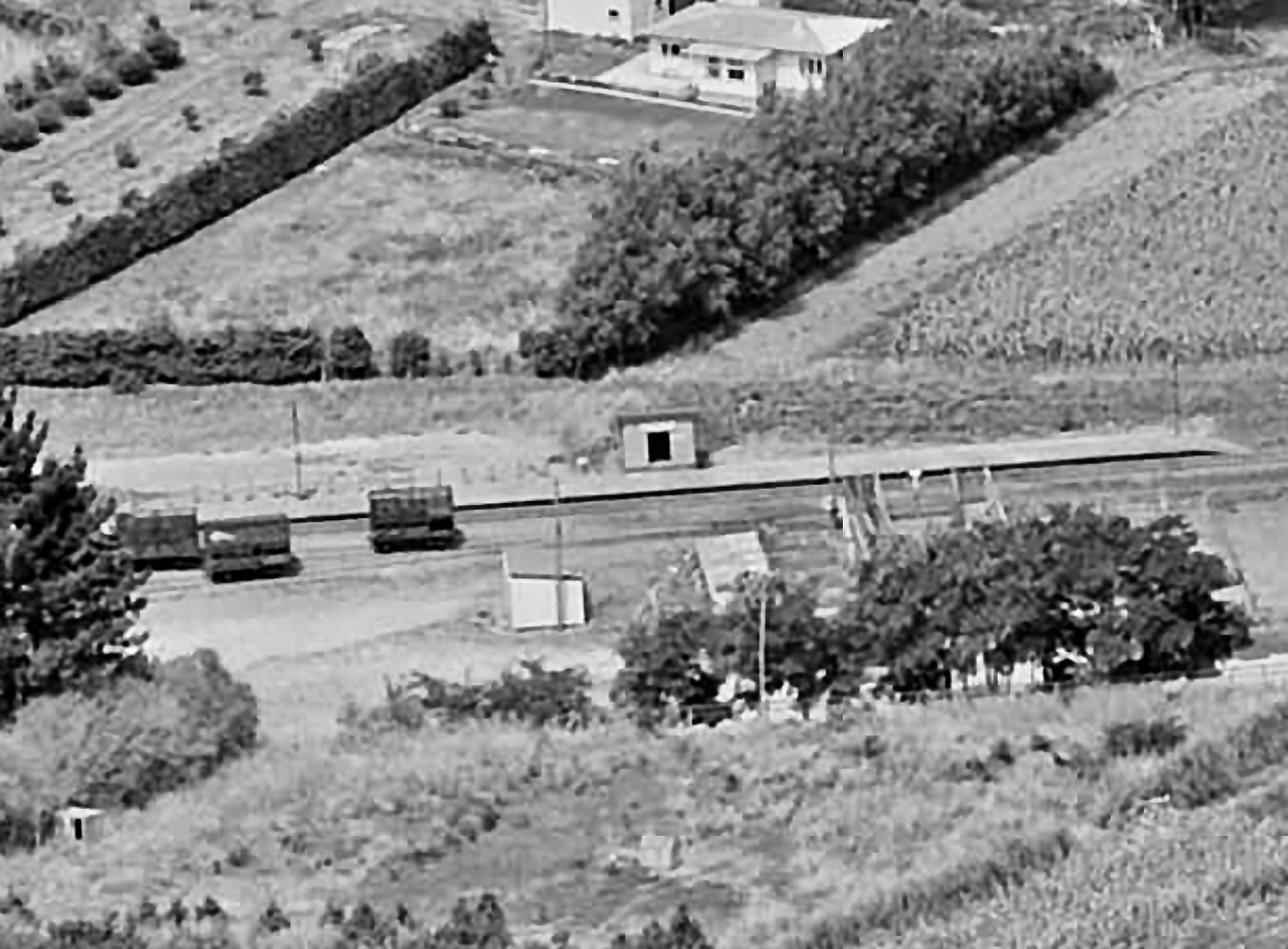
Ōtumoetai station on 24 February 1954

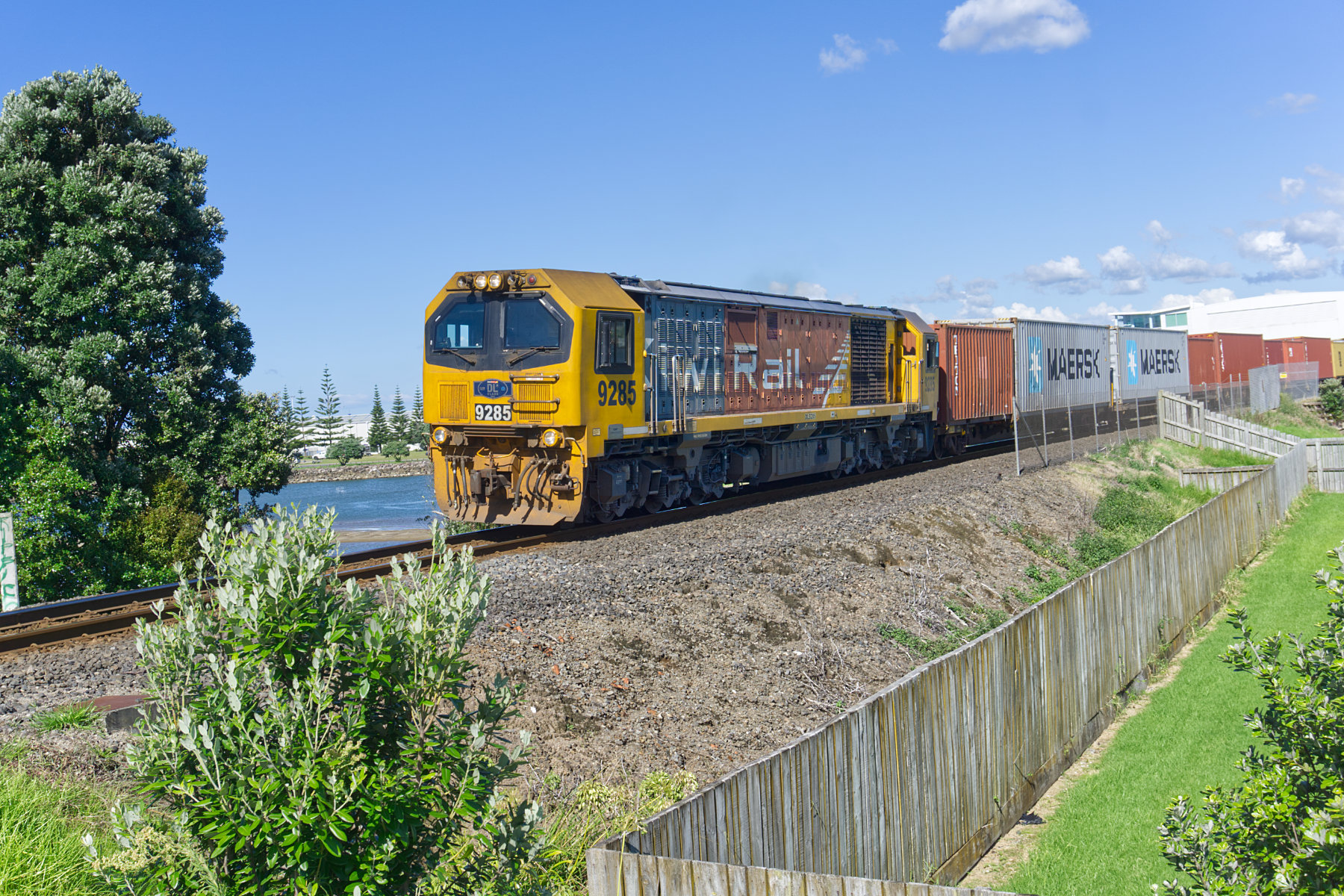
Class DL heads a train from Tauranga container terminal towards Hamilton in 2023, approaching Maxwells Road level crossing

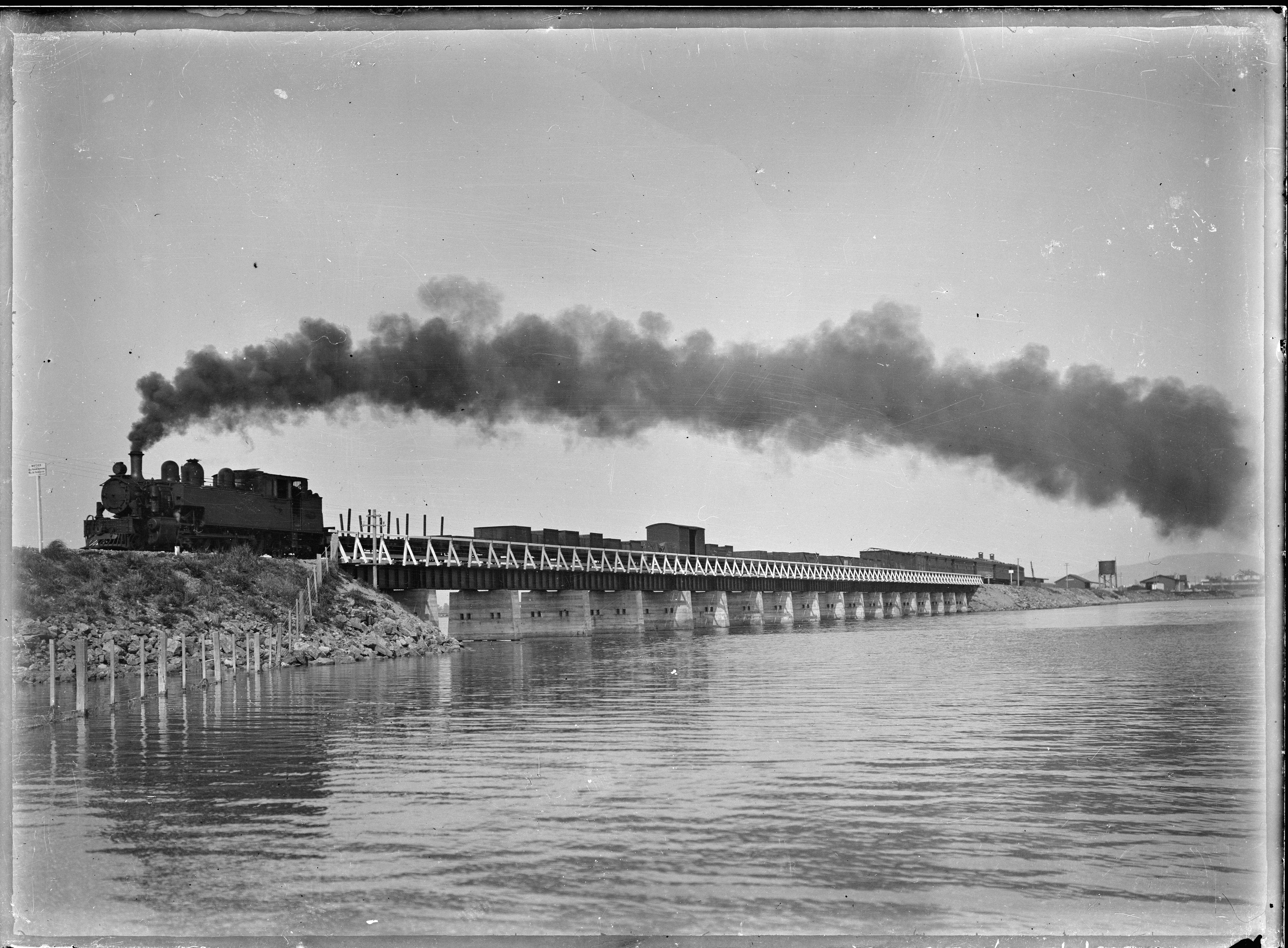
W^{G} class hauled train on Waikareao Estuary bridge

== Demographics ==
Otūmoetai covers 3.32 km^{2} (1.28 sq mi) and had an estimated population of 8,490 as of June 2025, with a population density of 2,557 people per km^{2}.

Historical population
Year	Pop.	±% p.a.
2006	7,086	—
2013	7,155	+0.14%
2018	8,034	+2.34%
2023	8,334	+0.74%

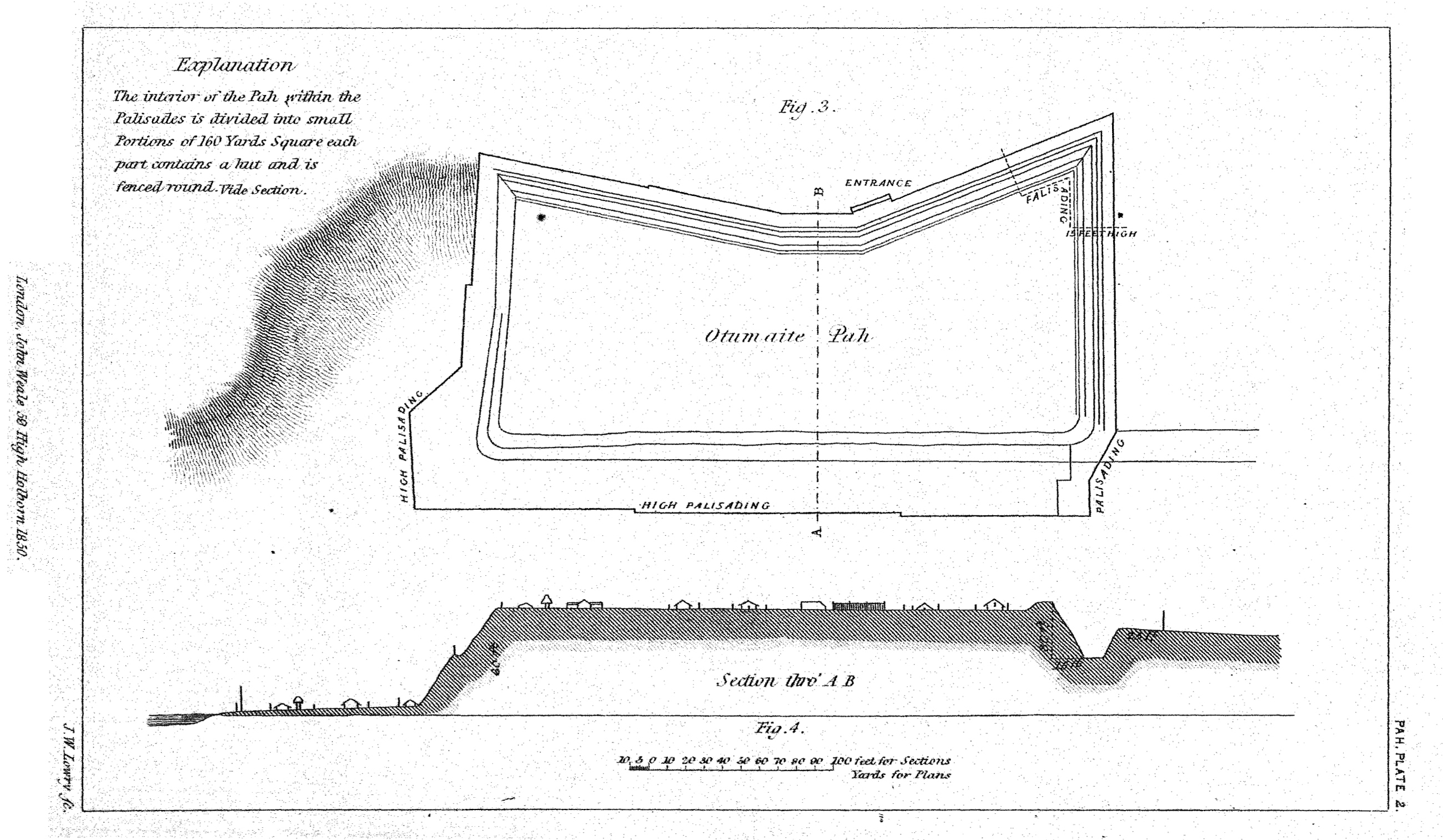
Ōtūmoetai Pā, Tauranga, 1842–1843. George Augustus Bennett, RE

Otūmoetai had a population of 8,334 in the 2023 New Zealand census, an increase of 300 people (3.7%) since the 2018 census, and an increase of 1,179 people (16.5%) since the 2013 census. There were 4,026 males, 4,287 females, and 24 people of other genders in 3,282 dwellings. 2.6% of people identified as LGBTIQ+. The median age was 42.9 years (compared with 38.1 years nationally). There were 1,584 people (19.0%) aged under 15 years, 1,218 (14.6%) aged 15 to 29, 3,756 (45.1%) aged 30 to 64, and 1,779 (21.3%) aged 65 or older.

People could identify as more than one ethnicity. The results were 87.1% European (Pākehā); 12.9% Māori; 2.2% Pasifika; 7.5% Asian; 1.4% Middle Eastern, Latin American and African New Zealanders (MELAA); and 2.6% other, which includes people giving their ethnicity as "New Zealander". English was spoken by 97.2%, Māori by 2.4%, Samoan by 0.3%, and other languages by 9.7%. No language could be spoken by 1.7% (e.g. too young to talk). New Zealand Sign Language was known by 0.5%. The percentage of people born overseas was 22.5, compared with 28.8% nationally.

Religious affiliations were 30.8% Christian, 1.2% Hindu, 0.3% Islam, 0.5% Māori religious beliefs, 0.5% Buddhist, 0.3% New Age, 0.1% Jewish, and 2.0% other religions. People who answered that they had no religion were 57.5%, and 6.9% of people did not answer the census question.

Of those at least 15 years old, 1,794 (26.6%) people had a bachelor's or higher degree, 3,609 (53.5%) had a post-high school certificate or diploma, and 1,356 (20.1%) people exclusively held high school qualifications. The median income was $44,500, compared with $41,500 nationally. 939 people (13.9%) earned over $100,000 compared to 12.1% nationally. The employment status of those at least 15 was 3,279 (48.6%) full-time, 1,089 (16.1%) part-time, and 132 (2.0%) unemployed.

Individual statistical areas
Name	Area (km^{2})	Population	Density (per km^{2})	Dwellings	Median age	Median income
Otūmoetai North	0.95	2,223	2,340	942	45.6 years	$42,400
Otūmoetai East	1.42	3,699	2,605	1,452	42.2 years	$44,600
Otūmoetai South	0.95	2,415	2,415	885	42.0 years	$46,400
New Zealand					38.1 years	$41,500

== Education ==
Otūmoetai has two co-educational state primary schools for Year 1 to 6 students: Ōtūmoetai Primary School, with a roll of 517 (as of March 2026), and Pillans Point School, with a roll of 458 (as of March 2026). Ōtūmoetai Primary was established in 1895, and Pillans Point opened in 1957.

Ōtūmoetai College and Ōtūmoetai Intermediate are located in neighbouring Bellevue.
