= Mamaku =

Mamaku may refer to:

- Sphaeropteris medullaris, a species of tree fern commonly known as mamaku
- Mamaku, New Zealand, a village
- Mamaku Ranges, a New Zealand mountain range
