= Tauranga East Coast and Hot Lakes District Railway =

The Tauranga East Coast and Hot Lakes District Railway Company Limited was a proposed railway from Tauranga in New Zealand's Bay of Plenty region to Rotorua, also in the Bay of Plenty.

== History ==
In 1880, Colonial Industry Commissioners recommended a railway from Tauranga, on the east coast of the North Island, inland to Rotorua. In the 1880s, New Zealand's economy was in the grips of the Long depression, and the New Zealand Government (with considerable investment in Vogel railways) was in no position to make further investment in railways. New Zealand's parliament passed the Railways Construction and Land Act 1881, which allowed for private companies to build railways and for the government to grant land to those companies in return. The Wellington and Manawatu Railway Company and the New Zealand Midland Railway Company were formed under this Act.

The company itself was formed on 7 June 1882 from the Railway Committee of the Tauranga County Council, with George Morris (MP for Tauranga) elected President and George Vesey Stewart elected chairman. Articles of Association called for £250,000 in capital to be raised, through shares sold at £1 each.

A public petition was presented to parliament on 19 June 1882, with 156,000 acres of land petitioned to be handed over to the company to build the railway.

=== Proposed route ===
The company proposed a route from Tauranga across the Tauranga Harbour through Papamoa, then Te Puke and Paengaroa, then following the present-day route of State Highway 33 to Okere Falls on Lake Rotoiti, along the eastern side of Lake Rotorua to Ohinemutu. Surveys commenced in 1884.

=== Legislation ===
The Parliament of New Zealand passed the Tauranga East Coast and Hot Lakes District Railway Company (Limited) Empowering Act 1882, which was granted assent on 15 September 1882.

=== Dissolution ===
In July 1883, the company announced that it had completed the valuation of the land granted to it, and that applications for shares were now open.

The company appointed Robert Horne as its liquidator in March 1886, and was finally wound up in September 1887.
