= Hillcrest, New Zealand =

Hillcrest is the name of three places in New Zealand:

- Hillcrest, Auckland, a suburb of Auckland
- Hillcrest, Waikato, a suburb of Hamilton
- Hillcrest, Rotorua, a suburb of Rotorua
- Hillcrest, Whakatane, a suburb of Whakatāne
