= Pomare, Rotorua =

Suburb of Rotorua, New Zealand

Pomare
- Suburb
- Interactive map of Pomare
- Coordinates: 38.154°S 176.217°E
- Country: New Zealand
- City: Rotorua
- Local authority: Rotorua Lakes Council
- Electoral ward: Te Ipu Wai Auraki General Ward

Area
  - Land: 137 ha (340 acres)

Population (June 2025)
  - Total: 1,840
  - Density: 1,340/km^{2} (3,480/sq mi)

Sunnybrook	Fordlands	Westbrook; Utuhina
	Pomare	Hillcrest
		Springfield

Pomare is a south-western suburb of Rotorua in the Bay of Plenty Region of New Zealand's North Island. Rotorua International Stadium is on the eastern side of Pomare.

== Demographics ==
The statistical area of Pomare, which also includes Matipo Heights and Westbrook, covers 1.37 km^{2} (0.53 sq mi) and had an estimated population of 1,840 as of June 2025, with a population density of 1,343 people per km^{2}.

Historical population
Year	Pop.	±% p.a.
2006	1,494	—
2013	1,572	+0.73%
2018	1,713	+1.73%
2023	1,740	+0.31%

Pomare had a population of 1,740 in the 2023 New Zealand census, an increase of 27 people (1.6%) since the 2018 census, and an increase of 168 people (10.7%) since the 2013 census. There were 849 males, 888 females, and 3 people of other genders in 579 dwellings. 2.1% of people identified as LGBTIQ+. The median age was 41.3 years (compared with 38.1 years nationally). There were 357 people (20.5%) aged under 15 years, 258 (14.8%) aged 15 to 29, 795 (45.7%) aged 30 to 64, and 330 (19.0%) aged 65 or older.

People could identify as more than one ethnicity. The results were 72.2% European (Pākehā); 29.7% Māori; 3.4% Pasifika; 12.6% Asian; 0.9% Middle Eastern, Latin American and African New Zealanders (MELAA); and 1.7% other, which includes people giving their ethnicity as "New Zealander". English was spoken by 96.0%, Māori by 6.7%, Samoan by 0.2%, and other languages by 11.9%. No language could be spoken by 2.1% (e.g. too young to talk). New Zealand Sign Language was known by 0.5%. The percentage of people born overseas was 19.8, compared with 28.8% nationally.

Religious affiliations were 35.9% Christian, 3.3% Hindu, 0.2% Islam, 1.7% Māori religious beliefs, 1.2% Buddhist, 0.3% New Age, and 1.0% other religions. People who answered that they had no religion were 51.4%, and 5.3% of people did not answer the census question.

Of those at least 15 years old, 315 (22.8%) people had a bachelor's or higher degree, 792 (57.3%) had a post-high school certificate or diploma, and 279 (20.2%) people exclusively held high school qualifications. The median income was $48,600, compared with $41,500 nationally. 177 people (12.8%) earned over $100,000 compared to 12.1% nationally. The employment status of those at least 15 was 759 (54.9%) full-time, 174 (12.6%) part-time, and 45 (3.3%) unemployed.
