= Sunnybrook, Rotorua =

Suburb of Rotorua, New Zealand

Sunnybrook
- Suburb
- Interactive map of Sunnybrook
- Coordinates: 38.145°S 176.211°E
- Country: New Zealand
- City: Rotorua
- Local authority: Rotorua Lakes Council
- Electoral ward: Te Ipu Wai Auraki General Ward

Area
  - Land: 209 ha (520 acres)

Population (June 2025)
  - Total: 2,190
  - Density: 1,050/km^{2} (2,710/sq mi)

	Pukehangi	Mangakakahi
Ngongotahā Valley	Sunnybrook	Fordlands
	Pomare	Hillcrest

Sunnybrook is a western suburb of Rotorua in the Bay of Plenty Region of New Zealand's North Island.

== Demographics ==
Sunnybrook covers 2.09 km^{2} (0.81 sq mi) and had an estimated population of 2,190 as of June 2025, with a population density of 1,048 people per km^{2}.

Historical population
Year	Pop.	±% p.a.
2006	1,941	—
2013	1,884	−0.42%
2018	2,067	+1.87%
2023	2,046	−0.20%

Sunnybrook had a population of 2,046 in the 2023 New Zealand census, a decrease of 21 people (−1.0%) since the 2018 census, and an increase of 162 people (8.6%) since the 2013 census. There were 993 males, 1,047 females, and 6 people of other genders in 702 dwellings. 2.3% of people identified as LGBTIQ+. The median age was 35.5 years (compared with 38.1 years nationally). There were 432 people (21.1%) aged under 15 years, 405 (19.8%) aged 15 to 29, 924 (45.2%) aged 30 to 64, and 285 (13.9%) aged 65 or older.

People could identify as more than one ethnicity. The results were 70.2% European (Pākehā); 35.8% Māori; 5.4% Pasifika; 11.0% Asian; 0.4% Middle Eastern, Latin American and African New Zealanders (MELAA); and 2.1% other, which includes people giving their ethnicity as "New Zealander". English was spoken by 97.5%, Māori by 11.1%, Samoan by 0.1%, and other languages by 10.4%. No language could be spoken by 1.8% (e.g. too young to talk). New Zealand Sign Language was known by 0.6%. The percentage of people born overseas was 18.6, compared with 28.8% nationally.

Religious affiliations were 33.7% Christian, 1.2% Hindu, 2.2% Māori religious beliefs, 0.9% Buddhist, 0.3% New Age, and 2.6% other religions. People who answered that they had no religion were 51.0%, and 8.7% of people did not answer the census question.

Of those at least 15 years old, 348 (21.6%) people had a bachelor's or higher degree, 918 (56.9%) had a post-high school certificate or diploma, and 348 (21.6%) people exclusively held high school qualifications. The median income was $44,400, compared with $41,500 nationally. 126 people (7.8%) earned over $100,000 compared to 12.1% nationally. The employment status of those at least 15 was 903 (55.9%) full-time, 237 (14.7%) part-time, and 51 (3.2%) unemployed.
