= Springfield, Rotorua =

Suburb of Rotorua, New Zealand

Springfield
- Suburb
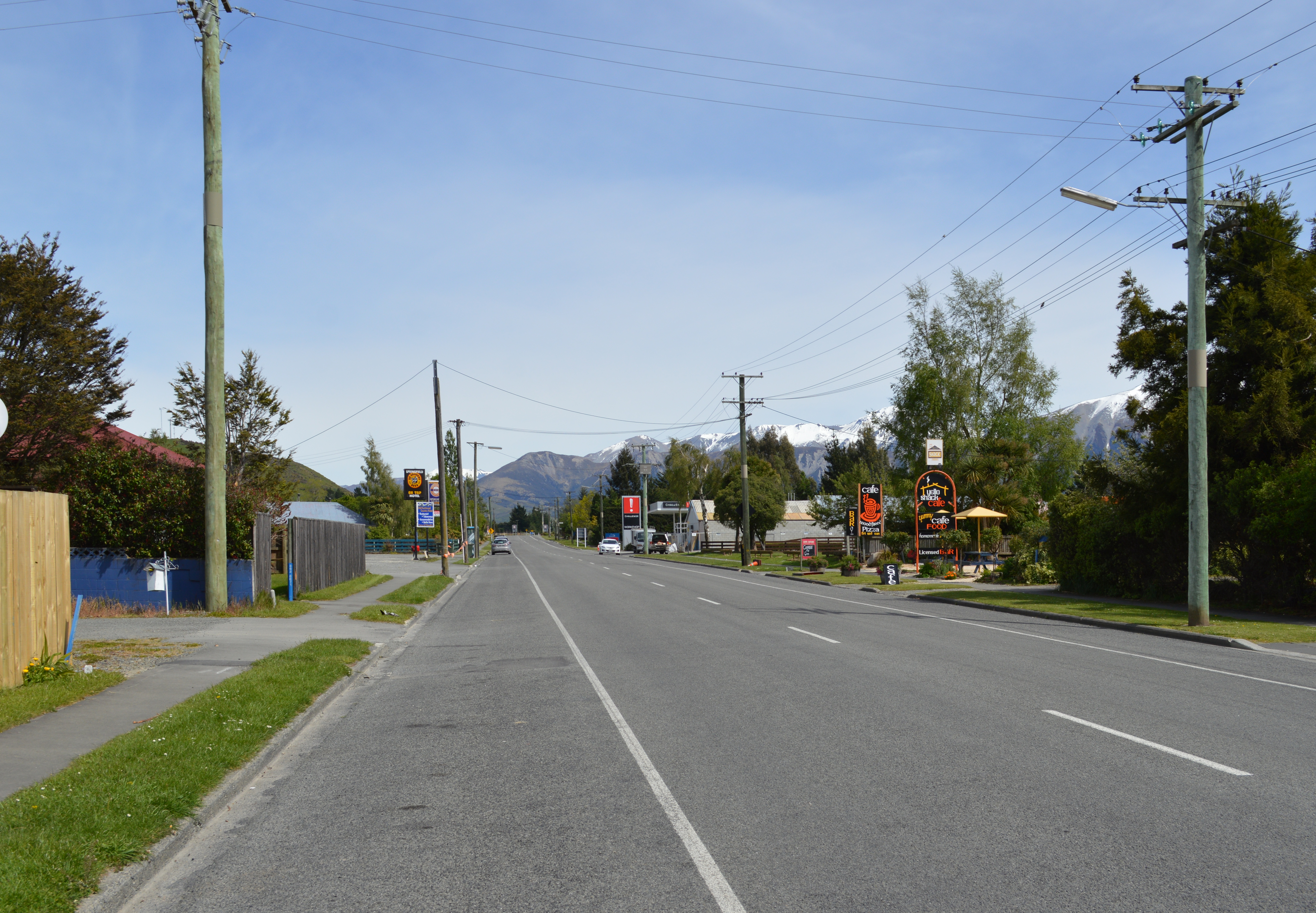
- Springfield main street
- Interactive map of Springfield
- Coordinates: 38.160367°S 176.235831°E
- Country: New Zealand
- City: Rotorua
- Local authority: Rotorua Lakes Council
- Electoral ward: Te Ipu Wai Auraki General Ward

Area
  - Land: 249 ha (620 acres)

Population (June 2025)
  - Total: 3,820
  - Density: 1,530/km^{2} (3,970/sq mi)

Pomare	Hillcrest	Glenholme
Matipo Heights	Springfield	Whakarewarewa
		Tihiotonga

Springfield is a suburb of Rotorua in the Bay of Plenty Region of New Zealand's North Island.

Springfield Golf Club started in 1947 and developed the course in Springfield from 1948.

== Demographics ==
Springfield covers 2.49 km^{2} (0.96 sq mi) and had an estimated population of 3,820 as of June 2025, with a population density of 1,534 people per km^{2}.

Historical population
Year	Pop.	±% p.a.
2006	3,702	—
2013	3,549	−0.60%
2018	3,780	+1.27%
2023	3,768	−0.06%

Springfield had a population of 3,768 in the 2023 New Zealand census, a decrease of 12 people (−0.3%) since the 2018 census, and an increase of 219 people (6.2%) since the 2013 census. There were 1,827 males, 1,932 females, and 12 people of other genders in 1,299 dwellings. 2.5% of people identified as LGBTIQ+. There were 744 people (19.7%) aged under 15 years, 537 (14.3%) aged 15 to 29, 1,671 (44.3%) aged 30 to 64, and 810 (21.5%) aged 65 or older.

People could identify as more than one ethnicity. The results were 75.6% European (Pākehā); 25.1% Māori; 3.6% Pasifika; 11.9% Asian; 1.0% Middle Eastern, Latin American and African New Zealanders (MELAA); and 3.2% other, which includes people giving their ethnicity as "New Zealander". English was spoken by 96.7%, Māori by 6.1%, Samoan by 0.2%, and other languages by 12.9%. No language could be spoken by 2.2% (e.g. too young to talk). New Zealand Sign Language was known by 0.4%. The percentage of people born overseas was 24.2, compared with 28.8% nationally.

Religious affiliations were 35.7% Christian, 1.4% Hindu, 0.5% Islam, 1.0% Māori religious beliefs, 0.9% Buddhist, 0.3% New Age, and 2.1% other religions. People who answered that they had no religion were 52.3%, and 6.1% of people did not answer the census question.

Of those at least 15 years old, 864 (28.6%) people had a bachelor's or higher degree, 1,533 (50.7%) had a post-high school certificate or diploma, and 630 (20.8%) people exclusively held high school qualifications. 390 people (12.9%) earned over $100,000 compared to 12.1% nationally. The employment status of those at least 15 was 1,572 (52.0%) full-time, 426 (14.1%) part-time, and 63 (2.1%) unemployed.

Individual statistical areas
Name	Area (km^{2})	Population	Density (per km^{2})	Dwellings	Median age	Median income
Springfield South	1.19	1,971	1,656	684	43.6 years	$51,300
Springfield North	1.30	1,797	1,382	615	43.9 years	$39,400
New Zealand					38.1 years	$41,500

== Education ==
Otonga School Te Kura o Tihiōtonga is a co-educational state primary school for Year 1 to 6 students, with a roll of 508 as of July 2025. It opened in 1958 as Otonga Primary or Otonga Road School, and expanded its name to Otonga School Te Kura o Tihiōtonga to celebrate its Māori heritage in 2015.
