= Gina Matchitt =

New Zealand jeweller, weaver and artist (born 1966)

- Born: 1966 (age 59–60); Rotorua, New Zealand
- Education: Unitec Institute of Technology; Massey University
- Website: ginamatchitt.com

Gina Matchitt (Te Arawa, Whakatōhea) is a New Zealand Māori jeweller, weaver and artist. Her work combines Māori pattern and language with contemporary pākehā brands and symbols.

== Biography ==
Matchitt was born and raised in Rotorua, and graduated from Unitec Institute of Technology with a diploma in design (jewellery) in 1994. She returned to Unitec as a lecturer in the School of Design from 1996 to 1999, teaching in the areas of body adornment, metal history and Māori arts. Her first solo exhibition, Ngā Whiriwhiri, was held in 1996 at Fingers Contemporary Jewellery Gallery in Auckland. Her Merchandise portfolio, representing external (Western) influences on Māori culture, won a Seppelt Contemporary Art Award in 1999 and was exhibited at the Museum of Contemporary Art Australia. She graduated with a masters of Māori visual arts from Massey University in 2011.

She and her family lived in Washington, D.C. from 2007 to 2012, then Rome for two years before returning to New Zealand.
