= Fordlands =

Suburb of Rotorua, New Zealand

- Suburb
- Interactive map of Fordlands
- Coordinates: 38.145°S 176.224°E
- Country: New Zealand
- City: Rotorua
- Local authority: Rotorua Lakes Council
- Electoral ward: Te Ipu Wai Auraki General Ward

Area
  - Land: 99 ha (240 acres)

Population (June 2025)
  - Total: 2,800
  - Density: 2,800/km^{2} (7,300/sq mi)

| Pukehangi | Mangakakahi |
| Sunnybrook | Fordlands | Utuhina |
| Pomare | Matipo Heights | Hillcrest |

Fordlands is a western suburb of Rotorua in the Bay of Plenty Region of New Zealand's North Island.

The area is named for Harry Ford (1878-1969), whose model dairy farm became the suburb.

It was described in 2017 as the most deprived suburb in New Zealand. The suburb was an inspiration for the novel Once Were Warriors by Alan Duff.

== Demographics ==
Fordlands covers 0.99 km^{2} (0.38 sq mi) and had an estimated population of 2,800 as of June 2025, with a population density of 2,828 people per km^{2}.

Historical population
| Year | Pop. | ±% p.a. |
|---|---|---|
| 2006 | 2,307 | — |
| 2013 | 2,118 | −1.21% |
| 2018 | 2,460 | +3.04% |
| 2023 | 2,667 | +1.63% |

Fordlands had a population of 2,667 in the 2023 New Zealand census, an increase of 207 people (8.4%) since the 2018 census, and an increase of 549 people (25.9%) since the 2013 census. There were 1,287 males, 1,362 females, and 18 people of other genders in 750 dwellings. 2.7% of people identified as LGBTIQ+. The median age was 29.7 years (compared with 38.1 years nationally). There were 711 people (26.7%) aged under 15 years, 639 (24.0%) aged 15 to 29, 1,062 (39.8%) aged 30 to 64, and 255 (9.6%) aged 65 or older.

People could identify as more than one ethnicity. The results were 32.8% European (Pākehā); 70.3% Māori; 15.0% Pasifika; 6.4% Asian; 0.2% Middle Eastern, Latin American and African New Zealanders (MELAA); and 1.1% other, which includes people giving their ethnicity as "New Zealander". English was spoken by 94.9%, Māori by 23.7%, Samoan by 1.8%, and other languages by 6.4%. No language could be spoken by 2.7% (e.g. too young to talk). New Zealand Sign Language was known by 0.7%. The percentage of people born overseas was 10.9, compared with 28.8% nationally.

Religious affiliations were 31.7% Christian, 0.6% Hindu, 0.4% Islam, 7.2% Māori religious beliefs, 0.6% Buddhist, 0.7% New Age, and 0.8% other religions. People who answered that they had no religion were 52.1%, and 7.2% of people did not answer the census question.

Of those at least 15 years old, 156 (8.0%) people had a bachelor's or higher degree, 1,080 (55.2%) had a post-high school certificate or diploma, and 723 (37.0%) people exclusively held high school qualifications. The median income was $30,100, compared with $41,500 nationally. 33 people (1.7%) earned over $100,000 compared to 12.1% nationally. The employment status of those at least 15 was 795 (40.6%) full-time, 198 (10.1%) part-time, and 183 (9.4%) unemployed.
