= Te Pokiha Taranui =

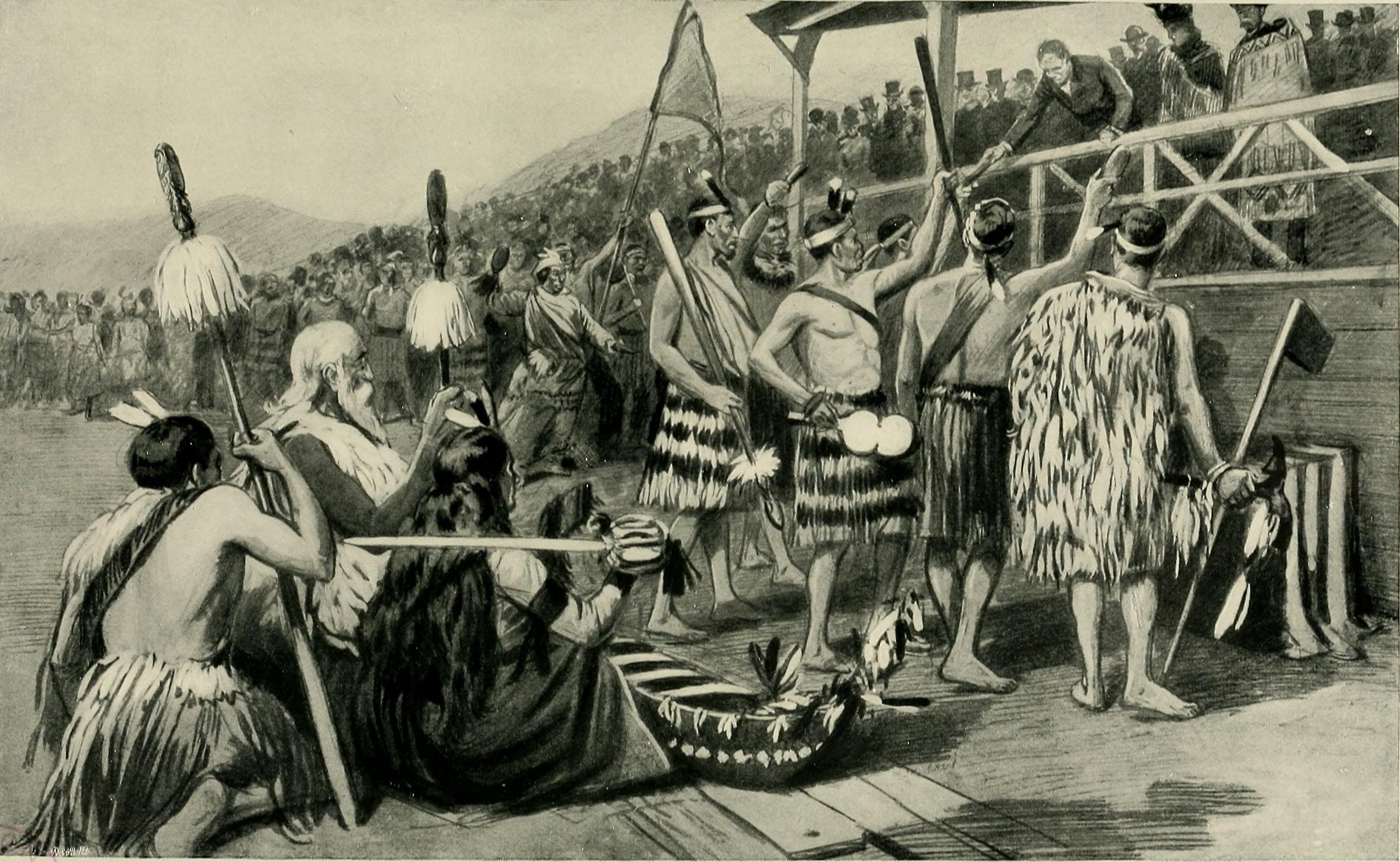
Te Pokiha Taranui (also known as 'Major Fox') at the imperial tour of the Duke and Duchess of Cornwall and York 15 June 1901 at the Rotorua racecourse

Te Pokiha Taranui (?–1901) was a notable New Zealand tribal leader and soldier. Of Māori descent, he identified with the Ngati Pikiao iwi. He was born in Rotorua, New Zealand.
