= Pukehangi =

Suburb of Rotorua, New Zealand

- Suburb
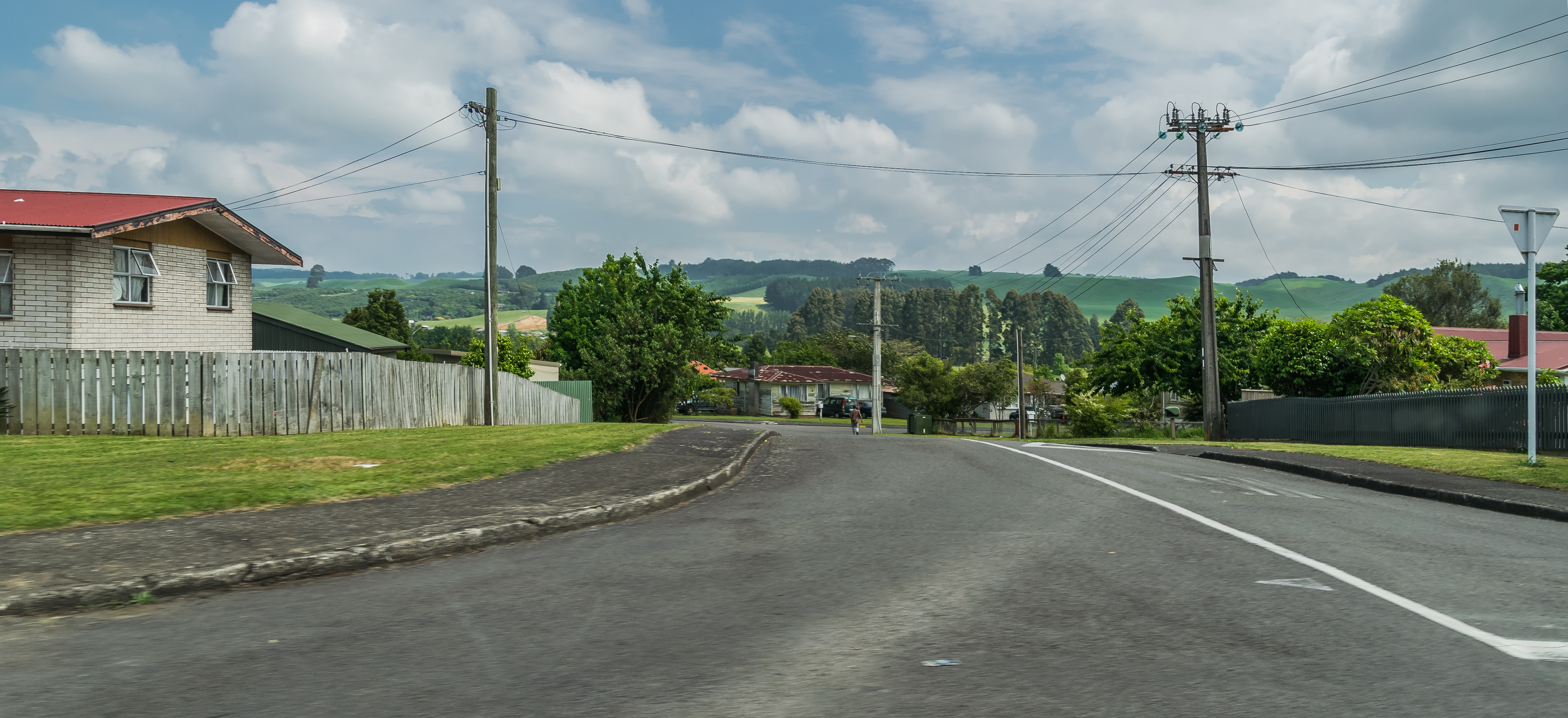
- Susan Street
- Interactive map of Pukehangi
- Coordinates: 38.136306°S 176.207755°E
- Country: New Zealand
- City: Rotorua
- Local authority: Rotorua Lakes Council
- Electoral ward: Te Ipu Wai Auraki General Ward

Area
  - Land: 229 ha (570 acres)

Population (June 2025)
  - Total: 5,460
  - Density: 2,380/km^{2} (6,180/sq mi)

		Western Heights
Ngongotahā Valley	Pukehangi	Mangakakahi
Fordlands	Sunnybrook

Pukehangi is a western suburb of Rotorua in the Bay of Plenty Region of New Zealand's North Island.

== History ==
In 2017, Rotorua District Council identified Pukehangi as a key area for future residential development. An 89-section subdivision and a 33-section subdivision were both announced that year. More sections were due to become available in 2019.

In December 2018, landowners of farmland west of the suburb sought planning consent to develop new residential areas. The plan change was approved by the Rotorua District Council and Ministry for the Environment during 2019. It was opened up it to public submissions in January 2020.

In 2019, a Pukehangi rental home was the subject of a 7-month legal dispute between a landlord and tenant, which ended with the High Court terminating the tenancy.

In 2023, Kāinga Ora was developing 60 new state houses on three sites in Pukehangi.

== Demographics ==
Pukehangi covers 2.29 km^{2} (0.88 sq mi) and had an estimated population of 5,460 as of June 2025, with a population density of 2,384 people per km^{2}.

Historical population
Year	Pop.	±% p.a.
2006	4,941	—
2013	4,884	−0.17%
2018	5,274	+1.55%
2023	5,178	−0.37%

Pukehangi had a population of 5,178 in the 2023 New Zealand census, a decrease of 96 people (−1.8%) since the 2018 census, and an increase of 294 people (6.0%) since the 2013 census. There were 2,499 males, 2,667 females, and 12 people of other genders in 1,677 dwellings. 2.4% of people identified as LGBTIQ+. The median age was 34.4 years (compared with 38.1 years nationally). There were 1,224 people (23.6%) aged under 15 years, 1,008 (19.5%) aged 15 to 29, 2,208 (42.6%) aged 30 to 64, and 738 (14.3%) aged 65 or older.

People could identify as more than one ethnicity. The results were 62.2% European (Pākehā); 47.1% Māori; 8.0% Pasifika; 8.5% Asian; 0.6% Middle Eastern, Latin American and African New Zealanders (MELAA); and 1.7% other, which includes people giving their ethnicity as "New Zealander". English was spoken by 95.8%, Māori by 13.2%, Samoan by 0.5%, and other languages by 9.1%. No language could be spoken by 2.5% (e.g. too young to talk). New Zealand Sign Language was known by 0.7%. The percentage of people born overseas was 15.9, compared with 28.8% nationally.

Religious affiliations were 29.7% Christian, 1.1% Hindu, 0.1% Islam, 2.7% Māori religious beliefs, 1.0% Buddhist, 0.3% New Age, 0.1% Jewish, and 0.9% other religions. People who answered that they had no religion were 56.7%, and 7.6% of people did not answer the census question.

Of those at least 15 years old, 657 (16.6%) people had a bachelor's or higher degree, 2,262 (57.2%) had a post-high school certificate or diploma, and 1,035 (26.2%) people exclusively held high school qualifications. The median income was $38,700, compared with $41,500 nationally. 288 people (7.3%) earned over $100,000 compared to 12.1% nationally. The employment status of those at least 15 was 2,058 (52.0%) full-time, 495 (12.5%) part-time, and 186 (4.7%) unemployed.

Individual statistical areas
Name	Area (km^{2})	Population	Density (per km^{2})	Dwellings	Median age	Median income
Pukehangi North	1.18	2,658	2,253	768	30.0 years	$35,400
Pukehangi South	1.11	2,520	2,270	906	41.3 years	$42,800
New Zealand					38.1 years	$41,500
