= Hillcrest, Rotorua =

Suburb of Rotorua, New Zealand

Hillcrest
- Suburb
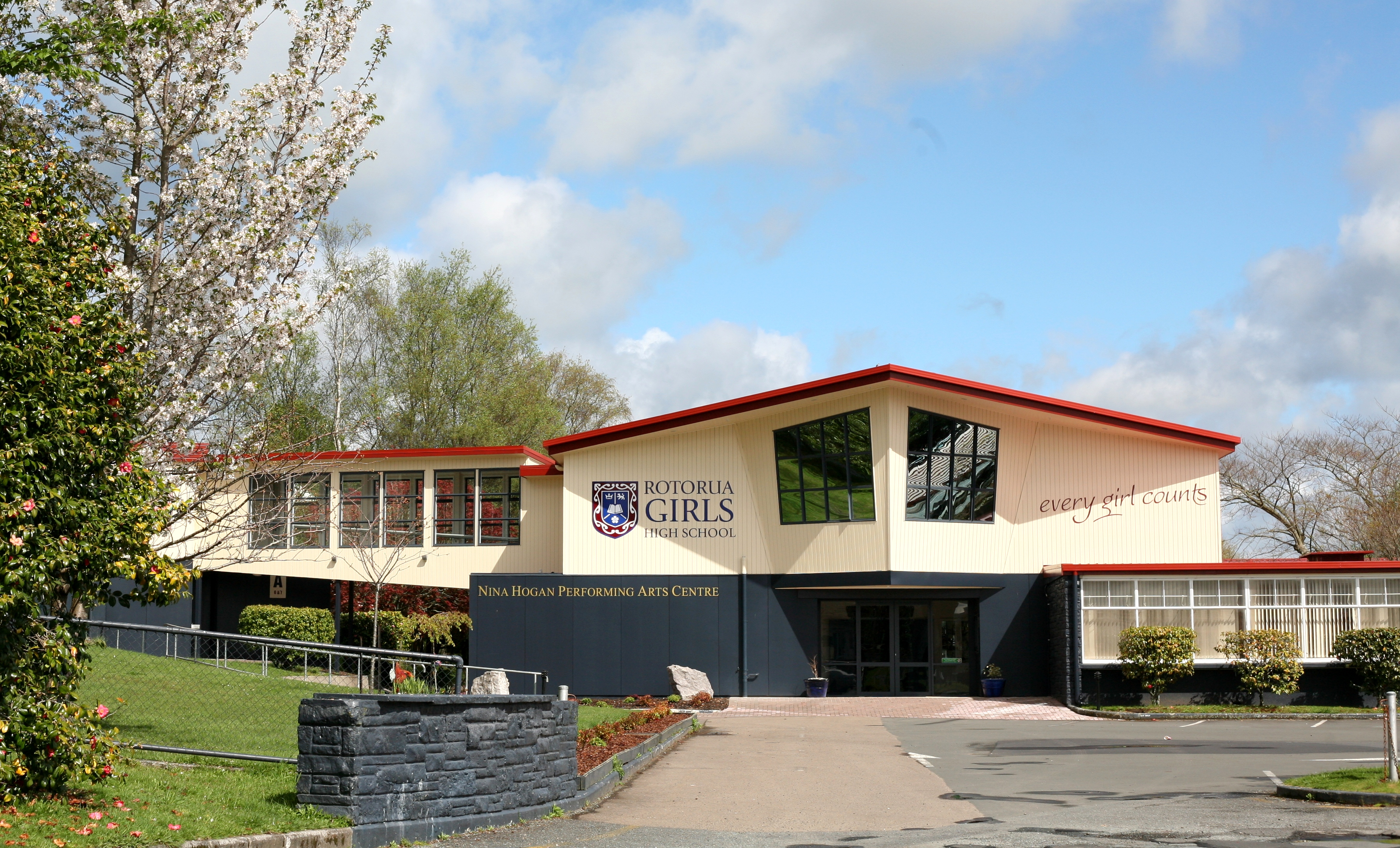
- Rotorua Girls' High School
- Interactive map of Hillcrest
- Coordinates: 38.148974°S 176.233167°E
- Country: New Zealand
- City: Rotorua
- Local authority: Rotorua Lakes Council
- Electoral ward: Te Ipu Wai Auraki General Ward

Area
  - Land: 81 ha (200 acres)

Population (June 2025)
  - Total: 1,960
  - Density: 2,400/km^{2} (6,300/sq mi)

Fordlands	Utuhina	Victoria
Westbrook; Pomare	Hillcrest	Glenholme
	Springfield	Glenholme

Hillcrest is an inner city suburb of Rotorua in the Bay of Plenty Region of New Zealand's North Island.

== Demographics ==
Hillcrest covers 0.81 km^{2} (0.31 sq mi) and had an estimated population of 1,960 as of June 2025, with a population density of 2,420 people per km^{2}.

Historical population
Year	Pop.	±% p.a.
2006	1,716	—
2013	1,623	−0.79%
2018	1,917	+3.39%
2023	1,863	−0.57%

Hillcrest had a population of 1,863 in the 2023 New Zealand census, a decrease of 54 people (−2.8%) since the 2018 census, and an increase of 240 people (14.8%) since the 2013 census. There were 915 males, 945 females, and 3 people of other genders in 543 dwellings. 2.9% of people identified as LGBTIQ+. The median age was 33.1 years (compared with 38.1 years nationally). There were 435 people (23.3%) aged under 15 years, 393 (21.1%) aged 15 to 29, 840 (45.1%) aged 30 to 64, and 192 (10.3%) aged 65 or older.

People could identify as more than one ethnicity. The results were 57.0% European (Pākehā); 45.1% Māori; 5.3% Pasifika; 14.2% Asian; 1.0% Middle Eastern, Latin American and African New Zealanders (MELAA); and 1.9% other, which includes people giving their ethnicity as "New Zealander". English was spoken by 95.0%, Māori by 13.7%, Samoan by 0.3%, and other languages by 12.7%. No language could be spoken by 2.1% (e.g. too young to talk). New Zealand Sign Language was known by 1.0%. The percentage of people born overseas was 20.1, compared with 28.8% nationally.

Religious affiliations were 29.1% Christian, 3.5% Hindu, 0.2% Islam, 4.2% Māori religious beliefs, 0.5% Buddhist, 0.5% New Age, and 2.1% other religions. People who answered that they had no religion were 53.5%, and 6.6% of people did not answer the census question.

Of those at least 15 years old, 318 (22.3%) people had a bachelor's or higher degree, 786 (55.0%) had a post-high school certificate or diploma, and 324 (22.7%) people exclusively held high school qualifications. The median income was $40,700, compared with $41,500 nationally. 87 people (6.1%) earned over $100,000 compared to 12.1% nationally. The employment status of those at least 15 was 768 (53.8%) full-time, 195 (13.7%) part-time, and 84 (5.9%) unemployed.

== Education ==
Rotorua Girls' High School is a girls' state secondary school, with a roll of 646 as of July 2025. The school was formed in 1958 when Rotorua High School was split into single-sex schools, with Rotorua Boys' High School continuing on the original site. The school had substantial rebuilding of facilities at the turn of the 21st century.
