= Rotorua =

Rotorua Te Rotorua-nui-a-Kahumatamomoe (Māori)
- City
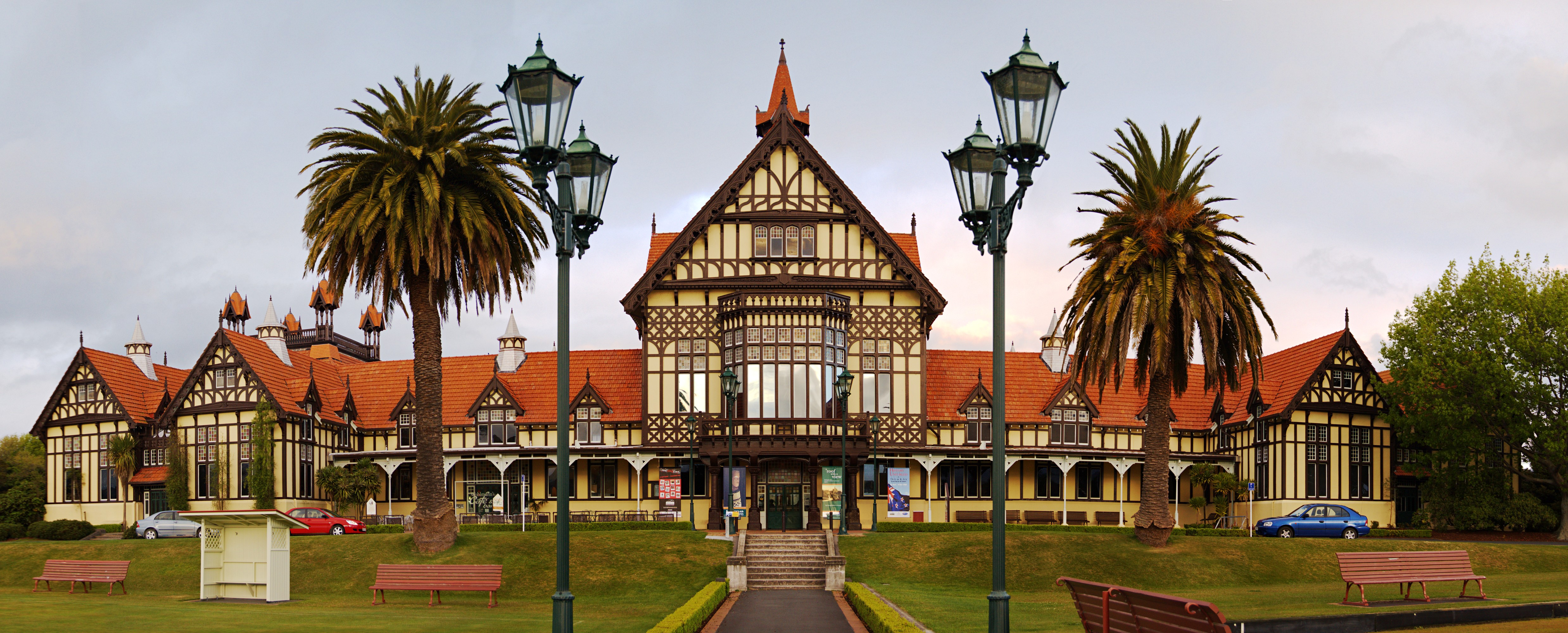
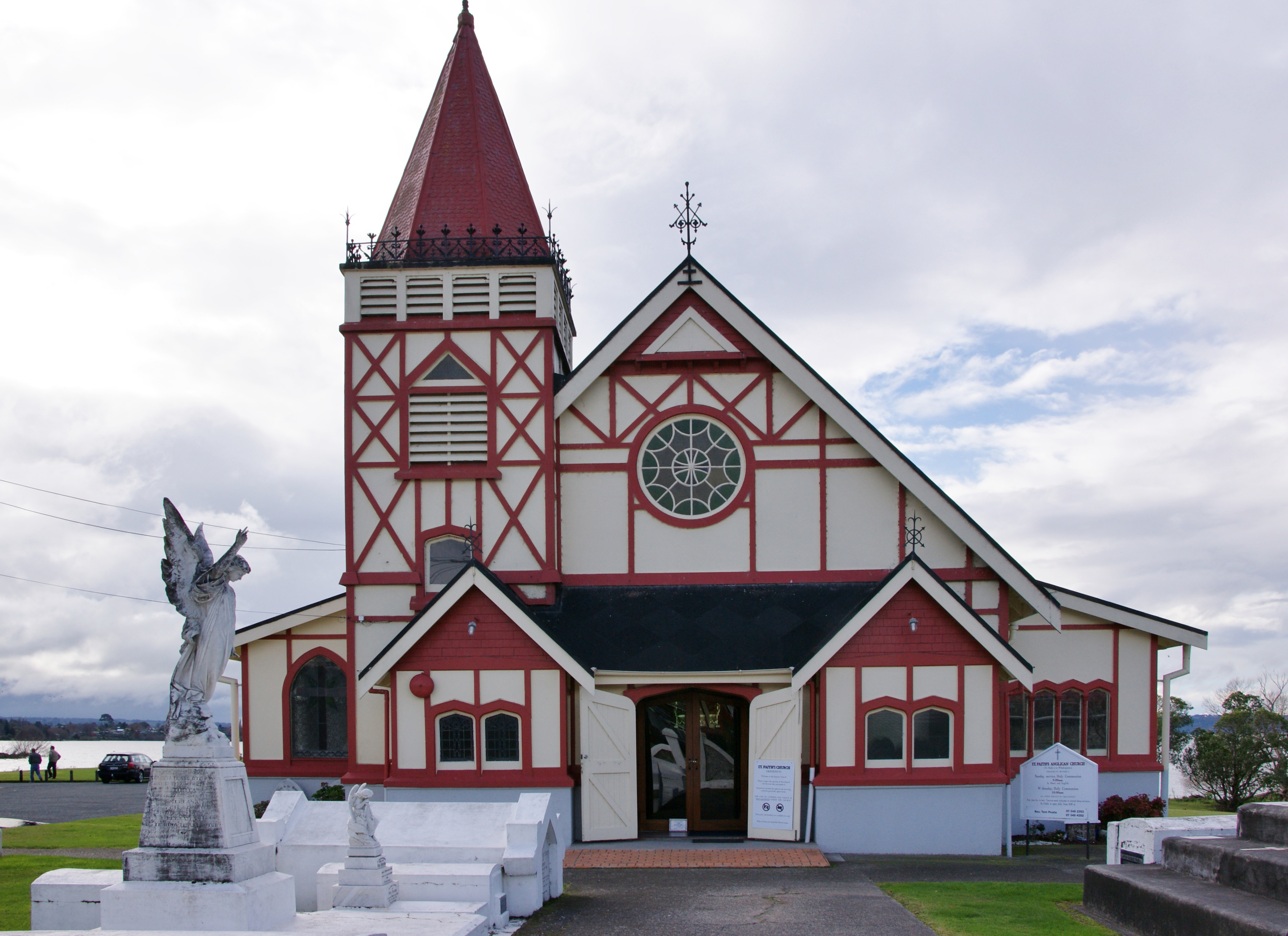
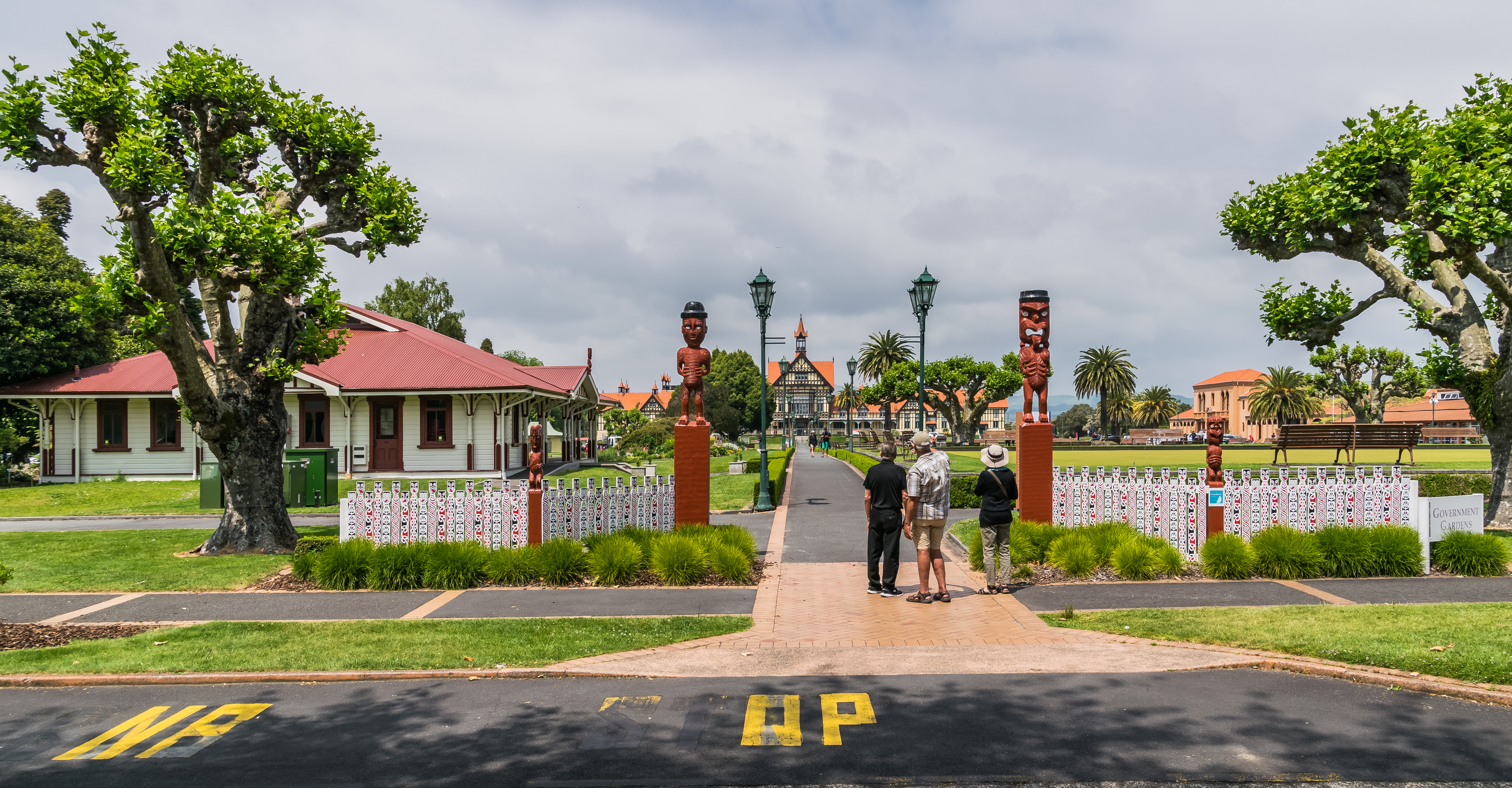
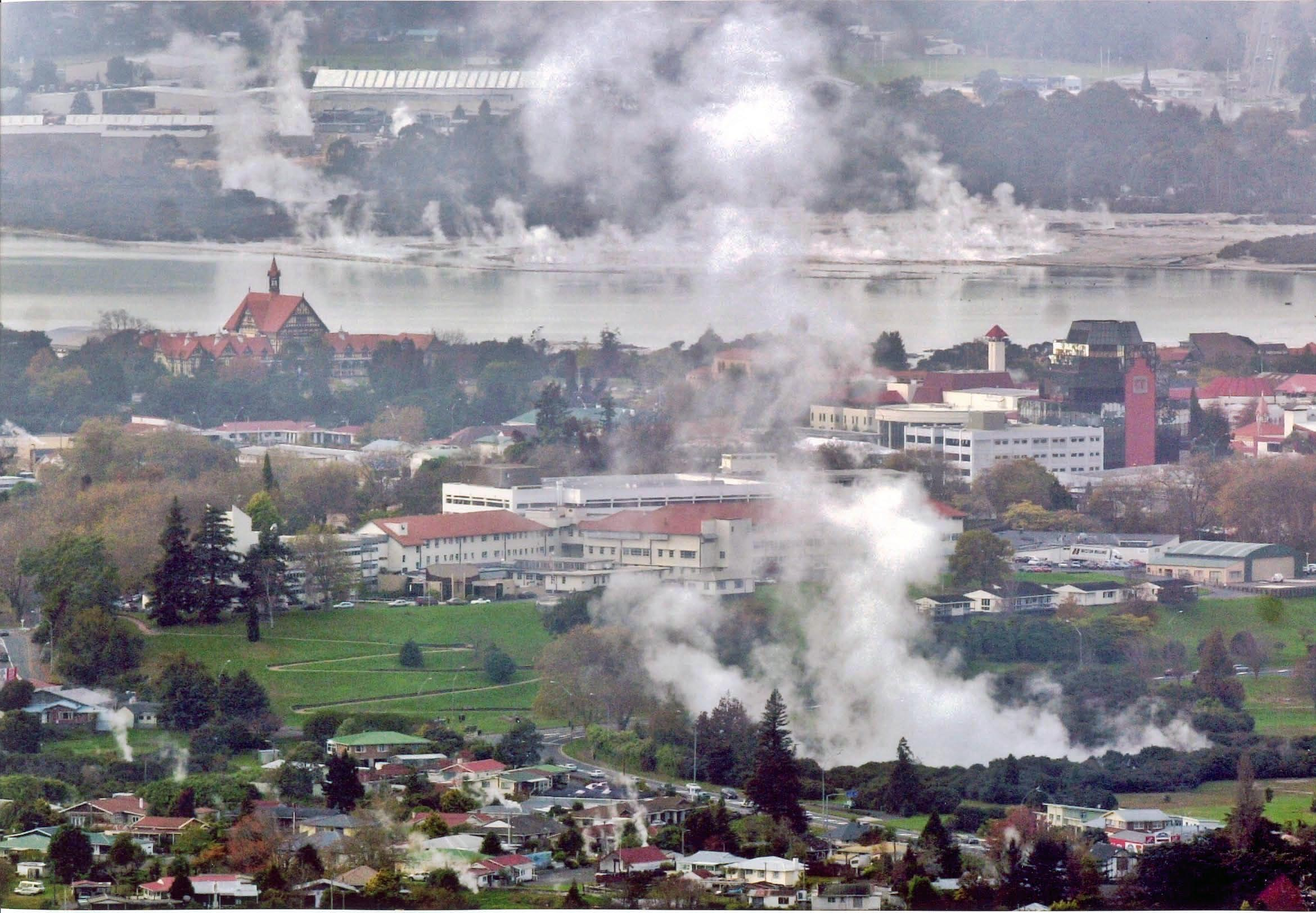
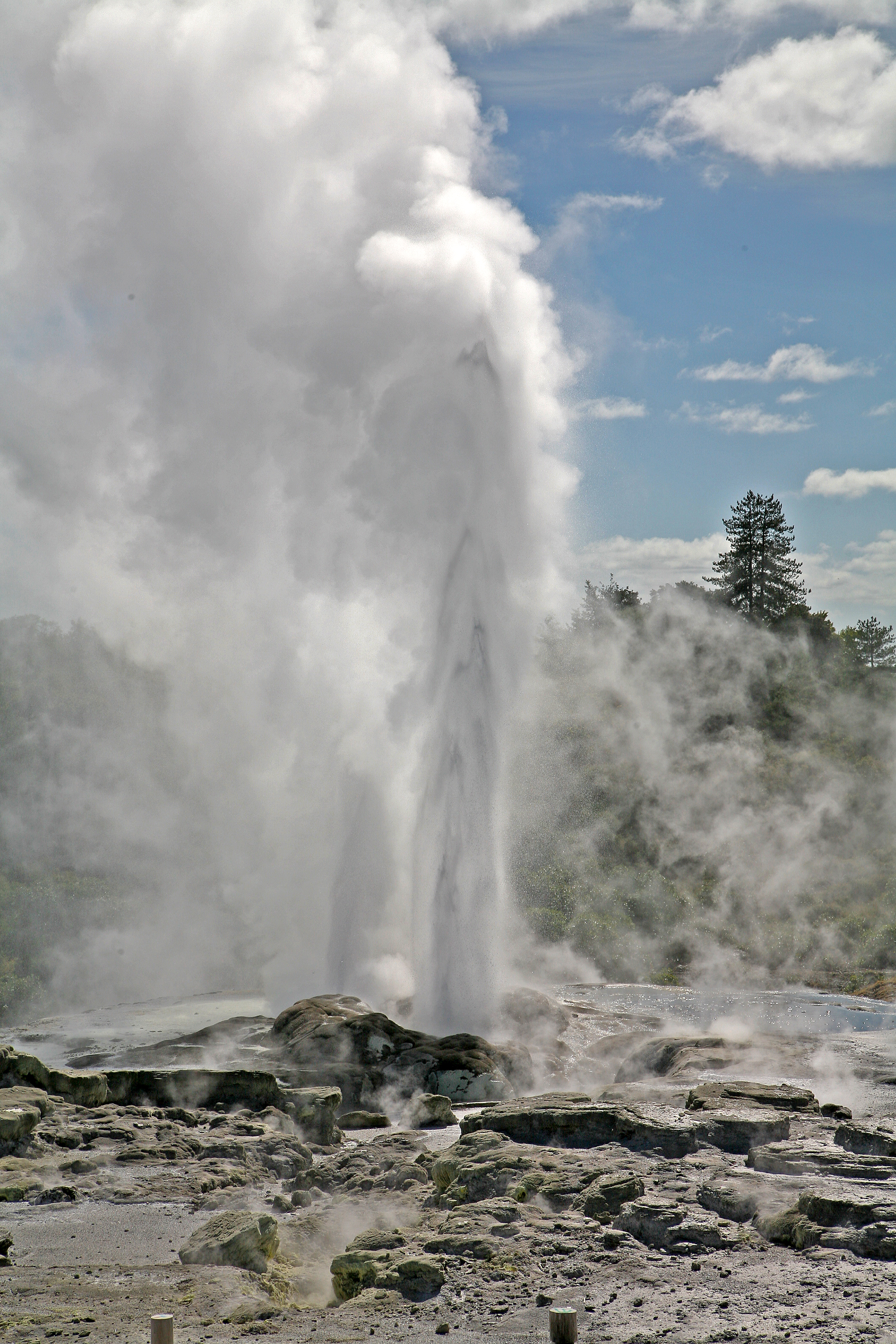

- Coat of arms
- Nicknames: Sulphur City, Roto-Vegas
- Motto: Tātau tātau
- Location within New Zealand
- Coordinates: 38°08′16″S 176°15′05″E
- Country: New Zealand
- Region: Bay of Plenty
- Territorial authority: Rotorua Lakes Council
- Settled by Māori: c. 1350
- Founded: c. 1350
- Borough status: 1922
- City status: 1962
- City status revoked: 1989
- Electorates: Rotorua; Waiariki (Māori)

Government
  - Mayor: Tania Tapsell
  - Mayor of Rotorua: Tania Tapsell
  - Rotorua MP: Todd McClay
  - Waiariki MP: Rawiri Waititi

Area
  - Territorial: 2,614.9 km^{2} (1,009.6 sq mi)
  - Urban: 46.06 km^{2} (17.78 sq mi)
  - Metro: 89.28 km^{2} (34.47 sq mi)
- Elevation: 280 m (920 ft)

Population (June 2025)
  - Territorial: 78,000
  - Density: 30/km^{2} (77/sq mi)
  - Urban: 58,500
  - Urban density: 1,270/km^{2} (3,290/sq mi)
  - Metro: 72,800
  - Metro density: 815/km^{2} (2,110/sq mi)
- Demonym: Rotoruan
- Time zone: UTC+12 (NZST)
  - Summer (DST): UTC+13 (NZDT)
- Postcode(s): 3010, 3015
- Area code: 07
- Local iwi: Ngāti Whakaue, Te Arawa
- Website: www.rotorualakescouncil.nz

Rotorua (Māori pronunciation: [ɾɔtɔˈɾʉa]) is a city in the Bay of Plenty Region of New Zealand's North Island, situated on the southern shores of Lake Rotorua, from which it takes its name. It is the seat of the Rotorua Lakes District, a territorial authority encompassing Rotorua and several rural settlements. It has an estimated resident population of 58,500, making it the country's 13th largest urban area, and the Bay of Plenty's second-largest urban area, behind Tauranga.

Te Arawa Māori first settled in Rotorua in the 14th century, and a thriving pā was established at Ohinemutu by the people who would become Ngāti Whakaue. The city became closely associated with conflict during the Musket Wars of the 1820s. Ohinemutu was invaded by a Ngāpuhi-led coalition commanded by Hongi Hika and Pōmare I in 1823. In the 19th century early European settlers had an interest in developing Rotorua due to its unique geothermal activity and the surrounding area. Then, efforts by Māori and Europeans alike to establish Rotorua as a spa town led to a 99-year lease of land from Ngāti Whakaue to the Government. The city became a major tourist destination due to its proximity to the Pink and White Terraces, until they were destroyed by the 1886 eruption of Mount Tarawera. Rotorua was elevated to borough status in 1922 and to city status 40 years later.

Rotorua is a major destination for both domestic and international tourists. It is known for its geothermal activity and Māori cultural tourism, and features geysers – notably the Pōhutu Geyser at Whakarewarewa – and hot mud pools. This thermal activity is sourced to the Rotorua Caldera, in which the city lies.

== Toponymy ==
The name Rotorua comes from the Māori language, where the full name for the city and lake is Te Rotorua-nui-a-Kahumatamomoe. Roto means 'lake' and rua means 'two' or in this case, 'second' – Rotorua thus meaning 'Second lake'. Kahumatamomoe was the uncle of the Māori chief Ihenga, the ancestral explorer of the Te Arawa. It was the second major lake the chief discovered, and he dedicated it to his uncle. It is the largest of a multitude of lakes found to the northeast, all connected with the Rotorua Caldera and nearby Mount Tarawera. The name can also mean the equally appropriate 'Crater lake'.

A common nickname for Rotorua is "Sulphur City" due to the hydrogen sulphide emissions, which gives the city a smell similar to "rotten eggs", as well as "Rotten-rua" combining its legitimate name and the rotten smell prevalent. Another common nickname is "Roto-Vegas", likening the city's own strip of road flanked by businesses and restaurants to that of Las Vegas.

== History ==
The area was initially settled by Māori of the Te Arawa iwi in the 14th century, and a thriving pā was built at Ohinemutu by the shores of Lake Rotorua. According to Te Arawa folklore, the city's bountiful geothermal springs had resulted from a plea by Ngātoro-i-rangi, an ancestral tohunga, for the gods to send fire-bearing spirits from Hawaiki, the semi-mythological Māori homeland. The Te Arawa who lived at Ohinemutu eventually began to call themselves Ngāti Whakaue, after their ancestor Whakaue Kaipapa.

Rotorua was a site of heavy conflict during the Musket Wars. During the early 1820s, the large northern iwi Ngāpuhi had begun expanding southwards, driving Ngāti Pāoa and their chief Te Hīnaki from modern-day South Auckland, and launched periodic raids into the Bay of Plenty. A military expedition into the Bay of Plenty by a combined Ngāpuhi and Ngāti Maru nō Hauraki force in 1818 had set the stage for further raids in the modern Rotorua area. Ngāpuhi and its allies launched an ambitious invasion of the Waikato in 1822, with a battalion led by junior chief Te Pae-o-te-Rangi ambushed and slaughtered by Ngāti Whakaue for trespassing into Rotorua. This was apparently at the insistence of Te Rauparaha; under Māori customary law the attack demanded utu. Ngāpuhi commander Hongi Hika convened with his fellow chiefs Pōmare I and Te Wera Hauraki to propose war, and thus in February 1823 a Ngāpuhi-led coalition invaded Rotorua. The force, which also included Ngāti Whātua and some Waikato Tainui, landed at Tauranga and headed up the Pongakawa valley to attack Mokoia Island Te Arawa fell back after the loss of 170 men and were defeated by Ngāpuhi, and utu was satisfied.

The first European in the area was probably Phillip Tapsell who was trading from the Bay of Plenty coast at Maketu from 1828. He later married into Te Arawa and became highly regarded by them. Missionaries Henry Williams and Thomas Chapman visited in 1831 and Chapman and his wife established a mission at Te Koutu in 1835. This was abandoned within a year, but Chapman returned in 1838 and established a second mission at Mokoia Island.

The lakeshore was a prominent site of skirmishes during the New Zealand Wars of the 1860s. William Fox advocated for turning the Rotorua region into a national park, inspired by the Yellowstone in the United States. Conversely, the Te Arawa community suggested the establishment of a township centred around Rotorua's thermal springs, with the intent of developing a Polynesian spa and health resort where tourists could indulge in hot pools. In 1880, instead of selling the land, the Ngāti Whakaue people leased 50 acres to the Crown under the Fenton Agreement, granting the government the authority to offer 99-year leases on their behalf. Revenues from leases helped fund Rotorua Boys' High School, and increased significantly upon the expiry of the 99-year leases. The eponymous Fenton Street in the modern city's CBD bears the judge's name. Nevertheless, the enactment of the Thermal Springs District Act in 1881 gave the government exclusive rights to both purchase and lease lands containing hot springs, lakes, or river, and as a result, by the turn of the century, nearly half of the Rotorua blocks were sold. In 1993, the Crown settled a Treaty of Waitangi claim with the Ngāti Whakaue people to honour their broken contract, by agreeing to return the gifted lands that were no longer required for their original use.

The town was connected to Auckland with the opening of the Rotorua Branch railway and commencement of the Rotorua Express train in 1894, resulting in the rapid growth of the town and tourism from this time forward. Guidebooks about the 'Land of Boiling Water' also proliferated. During the 1880s, tourists, especially from Australia, started visiting Rotorua to witness its natural marvels such as the Pink and White Terraces until these were destroyed in a volcanic eruption in 1886. Rotorua was established as a borough in 1922, elected its first mayor in 1923, and declared a city in 1962 before becoming a district in 1979.

== Geography ==
=== Setting ===
The city of Rotorua and the adjacent Lake Rotorua are located within the Rotorua Caldera that was formed in a major volcanic eruption approximately 240,000 years ago. The caldera is the source of the geothermal activity that is a key feature of the city and surrounding region.

=== Climate ===
The Rotorua region enjoys a mild temperate climate (Cfb). Rotorua is situated inland from the coast and is sheltered by high country to the south and east of the city, resulting in less wind than many other places in New Zealand. During the winter months, June – August, temperatures can drop below 0 °C. Frost is common in Rotorua during its winter months, with an average of 57 ground frosts annually, and 20 nights per year below 0 °C. Snowfall in Rotorua is rare, and since the 1970s has only been recorded twice. On 15 August 2011 and 13 July 2017, snowflakes fell in the town centre, and during the July 2017 snowfall, snow accumulated in the nearby Mamaku ranges and in the outer reaches of the district, where snowfall occurs on average once every three years.

Climate data for Rotorua (1991–2020 normals, extremes 1973–present)
Month	Jan	Feb	Mar	Apr	May	Jun	Jul	Aug	Sep	Oct	Nov	Dec	Year
Record high °C (°F)	31.5 (88.7)	32.2 (90.0)	28.7 (83.7)	25.9 (78.6)	21.4 (70.5)	19.1 (66.4)	17.4 (63.3)	18.8 (65.8)	21.9 (71.4)	24.2 (75.6)	30.9 (87.6)	30.4 (86.7)	32.2 (90.0)
Mean maximum °C (°F)	26.9 (80.4)	26.9 (80.4)	25.0 (77.0)	22.0 (71.6)	18.9 (66.0)	16.3 (61.3)	14.8 (58.6)	15.8 (60.4)	18.3 (64.9)	20.4 (68.7)	23.1 (73.6)	25.0 (77.0)	27.8 (82.0)
Mean daily maximum °C (°F)	22.9 (73.2)	23.1 (73.6)	21.1 (70.0)	18.1 (64.6)	15.2 (59.4)	12.7 (54.9)	12.0 (53.6)	12.8 (55.0)	14.5 (58.1)	16.4 (61.5)	18.6 (65.5)	20.8 (69.4)	17.4 (63.3)
Daily mean °C (°F)	17.7 (63.9)	18.1 (64.6)	16.1 (61.0)	13.4 (56.1)	10.9 (51.6)	8.6 (47.5)	7.8 (46.0)	8.4 (47.1)	10.1 (50.2)	11.9 (53.4)	13.8 (56.8)	16.2 (61.2)	12.8 (55.0)
Mean daily minimum °C (°F)	12.6 (54.7)	13.1 (55.6)	11.1 (52.0)	8.7 (47.7)	6.6 (43.9)	4.4 (39.9)	3.7 (38.7)	4.1 (39.4)	5.8 (42.4)	7.4 (45.3)	9.0 (48.2)	11.5 (52.7)	8.2 (46.8)
Mean minimum °C (°F)	6.1 (43.0)	6.4 (43.5)	4.4 (39.9)	1.5 (34.7)	−0.9 (30.4)	−2.4 (27.7)	−2.7 (27.1)	−2.5 (27.5)	−0.7 (30.7)	0.4 (32.7)	1.9 (35.4)	5.0 (41.0)	−3.5 (25.7)
Record low °C (°F)	2.0 (35.6)	1.2 (34.2)	−0.2 (31.6)	−2.1 (28.2)	−3.6 (25.5)	−4.7 (23.5)	−4.2 (24.4)	−5.6 (21.9)	−3.3 (26.1)	−3.5 (25.7)	−1.0 (30.2)	−0.5 (31.1)	−5.6 (21.9)
Average rainfall mm (inches)	93.8 (3.69)	100.4 (3.95)	100.3 (3.95)	133.0 (5.24)	130.2 (5.13)	131.9 (5.19)	137.4 (5.41)	125.2 (4.93)	106.6 (4.20)	92.9 (3.66)	86.8 (3.42)	117.1 (4.61)	1,355.6 (53.38)
Average rainy days (≥ 1.0 mm)	7.7	7.6	8.1	9.3	9.9	10.9	11.4	12.1	11	10.3	9.5	10.8	118.6
Average relative humidity (%)	78.8	81.4	81.5	83.4	87.1	87.5	87.3	85.9	81.6	79.7	77.2	78.9	82.5
Mean monthly sunshine hours	242.9	205.9	199.7	170.5	145.1	119.1	130.7	152.1	155.1	190.8	200.1	215.8	2,127.8
Mean daily daylight hours	14.5	13.5	12.3	11.1	10.1	9.6	9.8	10.7	11.9	13.1	14.2	14.8	12.1
Percentage possible sunshine	54	54	52	51	46	41	43	46	43	47	47	47	48
Source 1: Earth Sciences NZ (sun and humidity 1981–2010)
Source 2: Weather Spark

=== Lakes ===
The Rotorua region has 17 lakes, known collectively as the Lakes of Rotorua. Fishing, waterskiing, swimming and other water activities are popular in summer. Several of the lakes are stocked for sports fishing with trout from the Fish and Game New Zealand hatchery at Ngongotahā. The lakes are also used for event venues; Rotorua hosted the 2007 World Waterski Championships and Lake Rotorua was the venue for the World Blind Sailing Championships in March 2009. Lake Rotorua is also used as a departure and landing point for float planes.

=== Suburbs and rural settlements ===
Suburbs

- Rotorua Central
- Fenton Park
- Glenholme
- Ohinemutu
- Ōwhata
- Mangakakahi
- Western Heights
- Selwyn Heights
- Sunnybrook
- Westbrook
- Fordlands
- Springfield
- Tihiotonga
- Lynmore
- Victoria
- Pukehangi
- Kawaha Point
- Koutu
- Ngongotaha
- Hillcrest
- Utuhina
- Whakarewarewa
- Ngāpuna
- Holdens Bay
- Hannahs Bay
- Fairy Springs
- Pomare
- Poets' Corner
- Kuirau

Rural settlements

- Hamurana
- Tikitere
- Rotokawa
- Tarawera
- Okareka
- Horohoro
- Mamaku, New Zealand

== Demography ==
The Rotorua urban area, as defined by Statistics New Zealand, covers 46.06 km^{2} (17.78 sq mi) and incorporates 29 statistical areas. It has an estimated population of 58,500 as of June 2025.

Historical population
Year	Pop.	±% p.a.
2013	48,897	—
2018	54,186	+2.08%
2023	55,326	+0.42%

Rotorua had a population of 55,326 in the 2023 New Zealand census, an increase of 1,140 people (2.1%) since the 2018 census, and an increase of 6,429 people (13.1%) since the 2013 census. There were 26,883 males, 28,254 females, and 189 people of other genders in 19,137 dwellings. 2.7% of people identified as LGBTIQ+. The median age was 35.6 years (compared with 38.1 years nationally). There were 12,270 people (22.2%) aged under 15 years, 10,878 (19.7%) aged 15 to 29, 23,739 (42.9%) aged 30 to 64, and 8,442 (15.3%) aged 65 or older.

=== Ethnic group ===
People could identify as more than one ethnicity. The results were 57.1% European (Pākehā); 46.0% Māori; 7.3% Pasifika; 11.9% Asian; 0.7% Middle Eastern, Latin American and African New Zealanders (MELAA); and 1.9% other, which includes people giving their ethnicity as "New Zealander".

=== Languages ===
English was spoken by 95.6%, Māori by 14.7%, Samoan by 0.5%, and other languages by 10.9%. No language could be spoken by 2.3% (e.g. too young to talk). New Zealand Sign Language was known by 0.6%. The percentage of people born overseas was 19.0, compared with 28.8% nationally.

=== Religion ===
Religious affiliations were 31.9% Christian, 2.1% Hindu, 0.4% Islam, 3.9% Māori religious beliefs, 0.8% Buddhist, 0.4% New Age, 0.1% Jewish, and 1.9% other religions. People who answered that they had no religion were 51.6%, and 7.2% of people did not answer the census question.

=== Education ===
Of those at least 15 years old, 8,322 (19.3%) people had a bachelor's or higher degree, 23,331 (54.2%) had a post-high school certificate or diploma, and 11,406 (26.5%) people exclusively held high school qualifications. The median income was $38,200, compared with $41,500 nationally. 3,174 people (7.4%) earned over $100,000 compared to 12.1% nationally. The employment status of those at least 15 was 21,432 (49.8%) full-time, 5,511 (12.8%) part-time, and 2,088 (4.8%) unemployed.

Rotorua has the highest proportion of Māori of any city in New Zealand.

== Government ==
=== Local ===
In October 2013, Steve Chadwick was elected Mayor of Rotorua and was re-elected in the 2016 mayoral election and the 2019 mayoral election. She previously served as the Member of Parliament for Rotorua between 1999 and 2008, and served as a Cabinet Minister in the Fifth Labour Government.

In 2022, Tania Tapsell was elected as the Mayor of Rotorua. She is the first woman of Māori descent to hold the role.

=== National ===
Rotorua is covered by the Rotorua electorate for the general roll and the Waiariki electorate for the Māori roll.

== Economy ==
In 2024, the gross domestic product (GDP) of the Rotorua District was $4,857 M, representing 1.2% of New Zealand's total GDP. The industry sector (Note: Based on Australian and New Zealand Standard Industrial Classification) with the largest contribution to the Rotorua District GDP was agriculture, forestry and fishing, at 10.7%. This is more than twice the 5.0% contribution that this sector makes to the national economy. The next highest contribution to the district GDP was from health care and social assistance, representing 9.1% in the district GDP, versus 6.6% in the national economy. Manufacturing contributed 7.1%, compared with 7.8% in the national economy.

The industry sector with the highest employment in the district was health care and social assistance, at 12.8% of the filled jobs. The next largest sector was accommodation and food services at 9.8% of the filled jobs. As a major visitor destination, Rotorua District has a higher proportion of jobs in accommodation and food services than the national average of 6.5%. Tourism (comprising parts of multiple industry sectors) contributed $336.9 million (6.9%) to the district GDP, down from 8% in 2000.

== Geothermal attractions ==
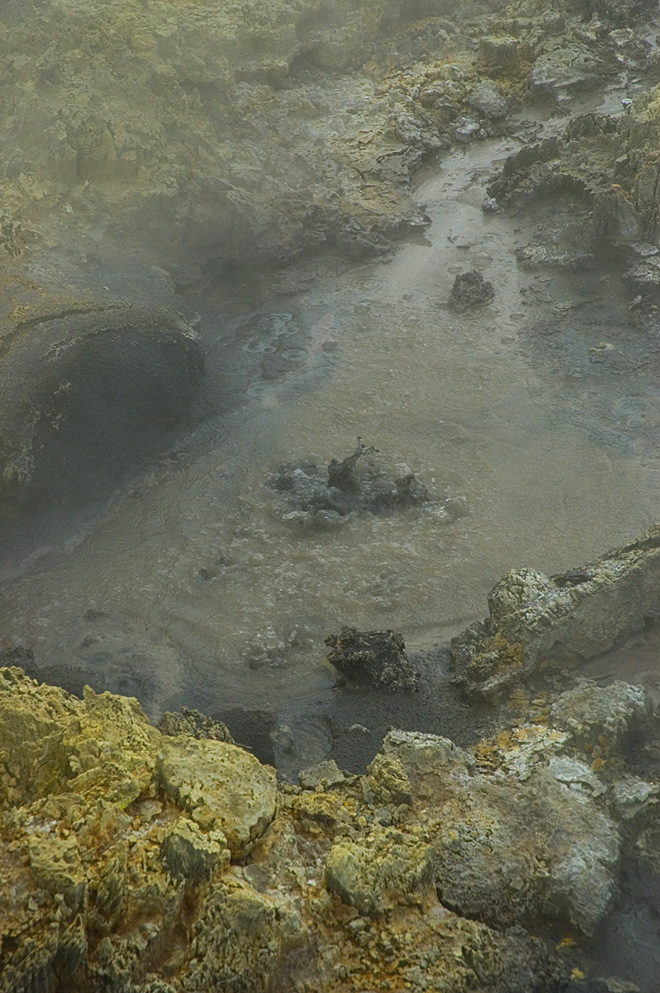
Mud pool, Tikitere ("Hell's Gate"), Rotorua.

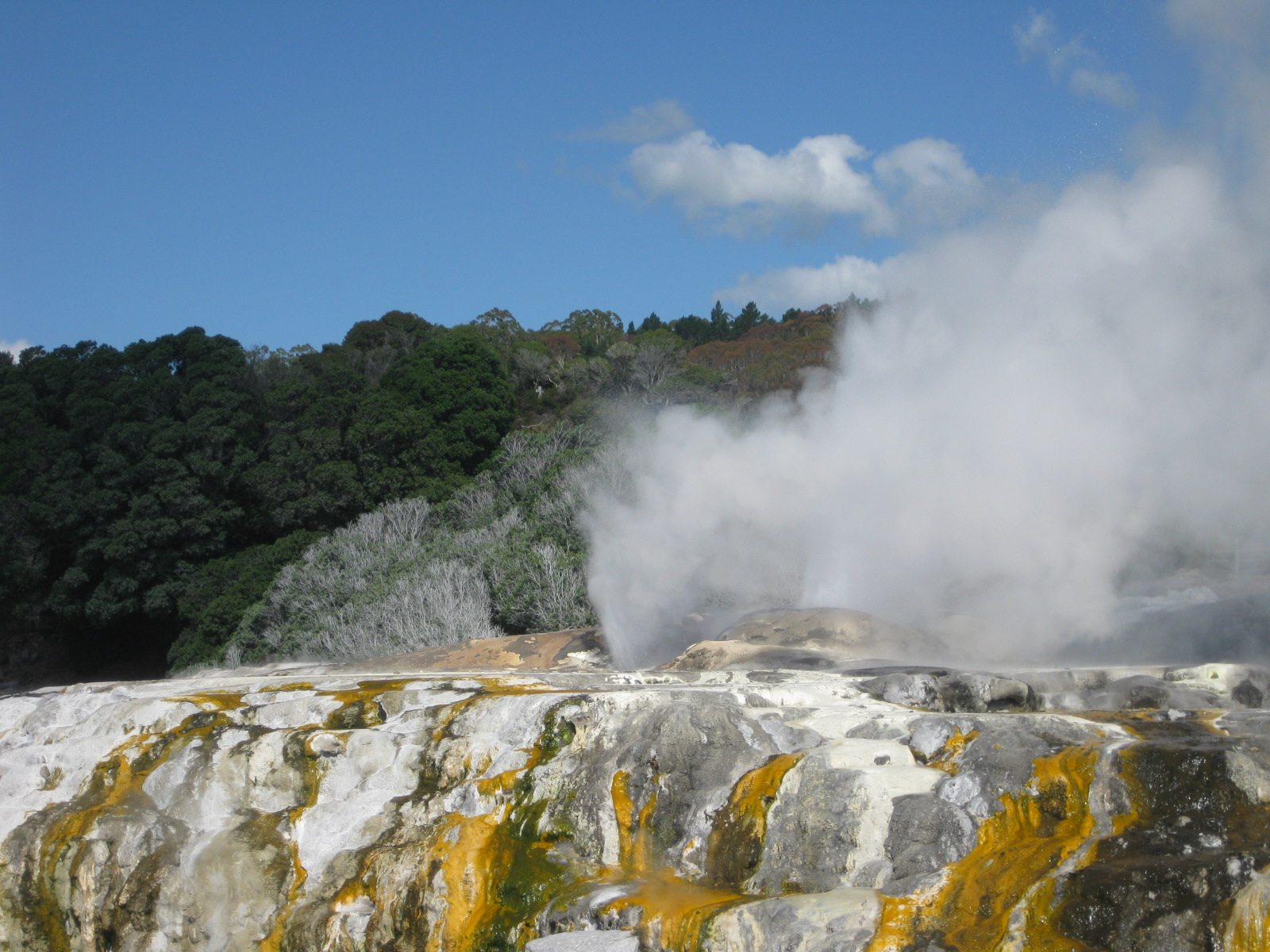
The Prince of Wales Feathers thermal spring erupting

Known as a spa town and major tourist resort since the 1800s, many of Rotorua's buildings reflect this history. Government Gardens, close to the lake-shore at the eastern edge of the town, include the Rotorua Museum of Art and History housed in the large Tudor-style bath house building, and the Art Deco style Blue Baths, noted for its embrace of mixed sex bathing in the 1930s. As of October 2023, both buildings are closed because of earthquake strength concerns.

There are many geothermal attractions in the Rotorua area, including:

- Kuirau Park, in the central city
- Government Gardens, including Sulphur Point
- Te Puia – a visitor attraction located in the Whakarewarewa volcanic valley, and home of the Pōhutu Geyser
- Tikitere – Hell's Gate Geothermal Park & Mud Spa
- Te Wairoa ("The Buried Village") — so named after it was buried by the 1886 Mount Tarawera eruption
- Lake Rotomahana
- Waimangu Volcanic Valley
- Waikite Valley Thermal Pools

The especially pungent smell in the central-east 'Te Ngae' area is due to the dense sulphur deposits located next to the southern boundary of the Government Gardens, in the area known as 'Sulphur Point'.

== Other attractions ==
=== Te Puia ===
Te Puia is a major visitor attraction and Māori cultural centre in Rotorua. It encompasses an area of 70 ha (170 acres) within the Whakarewarewa valley at the southern end of the city, and includes the Pōhutu Geyser, mud pools, hot springs, and silica formations. In addition to the geothermal features, Te Puia includes the New Zealand Māori Arts and Crafts Institute and national schools of wood carving, weaving, stone and bone carving. There is a carved meeting house, Te Aronui a Rua, and other facilities for visitors. In 2025, Te Puia was the supreme winner at the New Zealand Tourism Awards.

=== Lakeland Queen ===
Lakeland Queen is a sternwheeler passenger vessel that operates cruises on Lake Rotorua. She was built in Rotorua in 1986 by brothers Ian and Doug Stewart of the company Lakeland Steel Products, in the style of the historic Mississippi paddle steamers. Lakeland Queen was launched on 26 October 1986, and is the only sternwheeler passenger vessel in New Zealand. Lakeland Queen is used for breakfast, lunch and dinner cruises and sightseeing. Māori cultural entertainment has been provided on some cruises. The cruises often have live music, with Blues Cruises a regular feature.

=== Wingspan National Bird of Prey Centre ===
Wingspan National Bird of Prey Centre is a captive breeding facility and visitor centre located in the Ngongotahā Valley. Wingspan undertakes conservation, education and research activities related to birds of prey found in New Zealand, and provides demonstrations of falconry.

== Sport and outdoor activities ==
Another of Rotorua's attractions is mountain biking. Rotorua was listed as one of the Top 6 mountain biking destinations globally by the International Mountain Biking Association in 2015, when they awarded Rotorua the gold level ride centre status. The Whakarewarewa forest includes over 150 km of mountain bike trails and in August 2006 was a host of the UCI Mountain Bike and Trials World Championships. Each year, from 2015–present, Rotorua has hosted a round of the Crankworx World Tour.

The Rotorua Pistol club is among the largest in the Southern Hemisphere and hosted the 2013 Australasian IPSC Handgun Championship.

The Kaituna River, 15 minutes drive northeast of the CBD, provides class 5 whitewater kayaking and rafting through a tree-lined gorge.

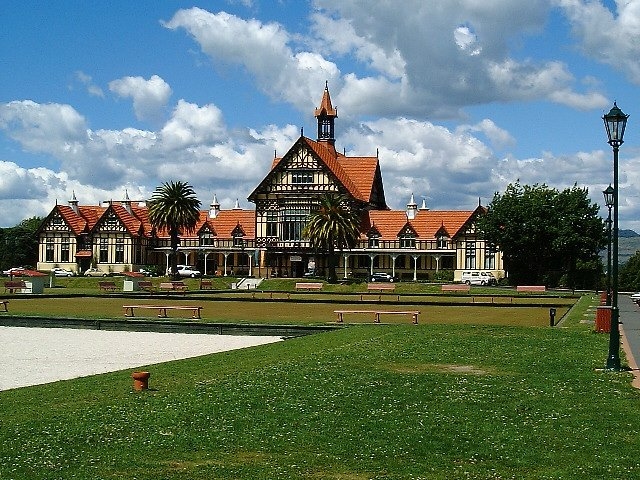
The Rotorua Museum of Art and History

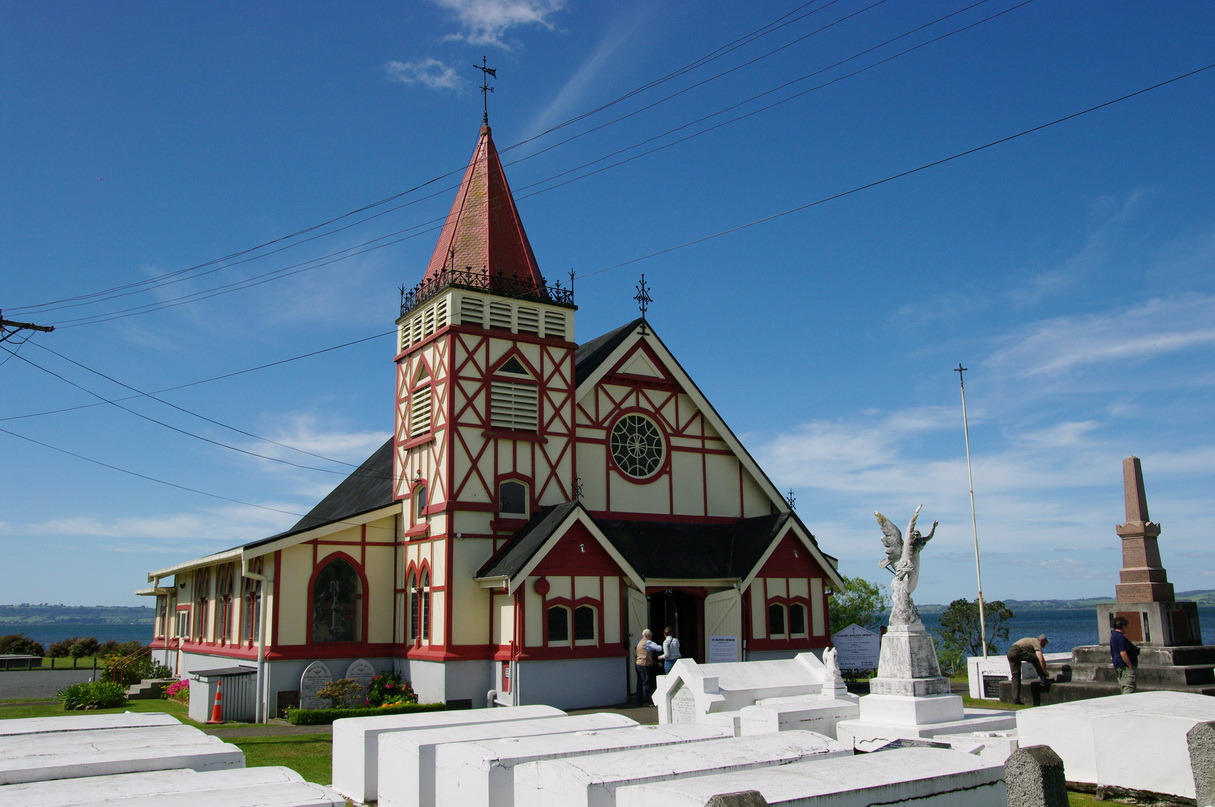
The historic Ohinemutu Church...

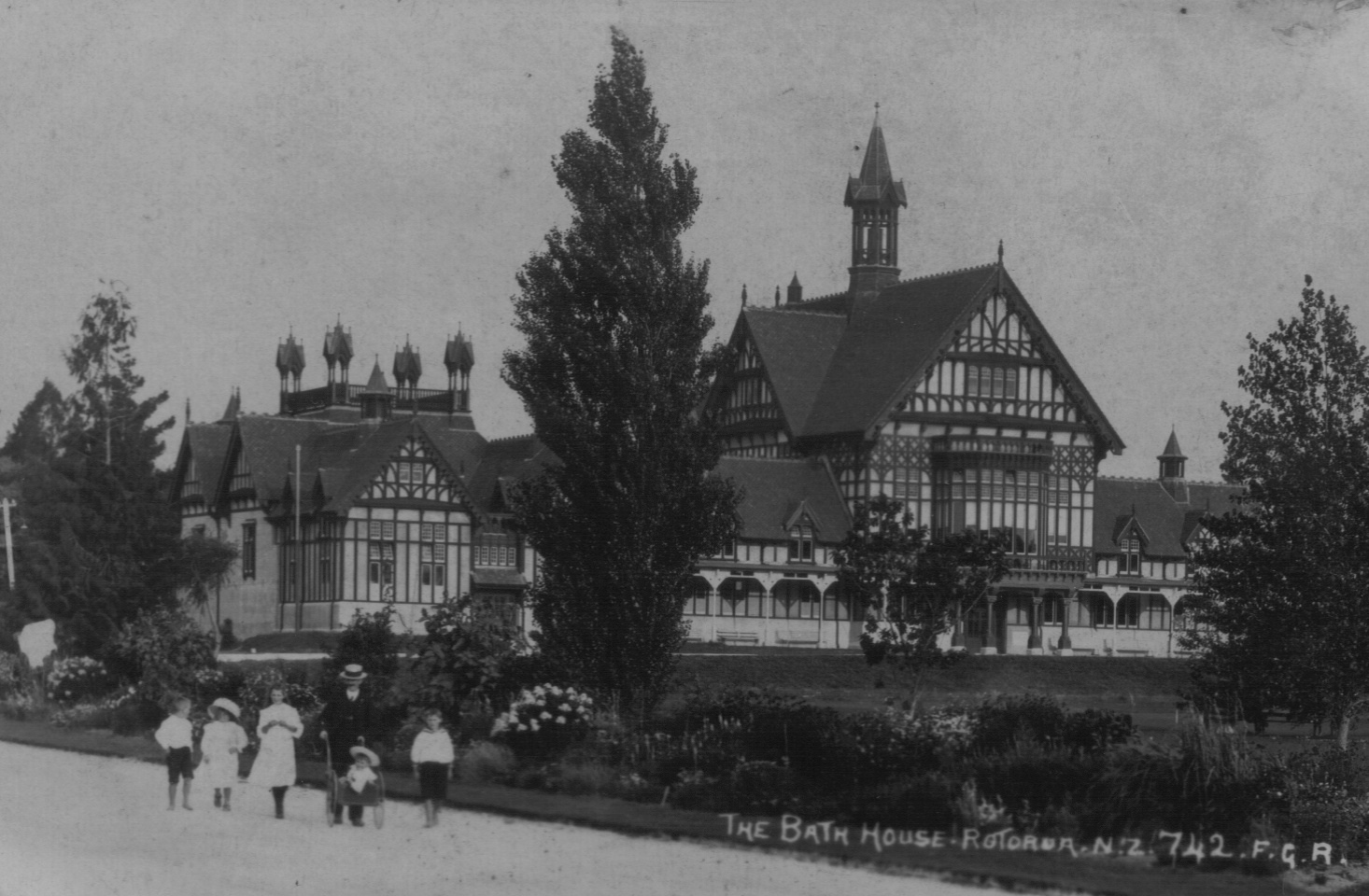
Pictured as a bath house in the early 20th century

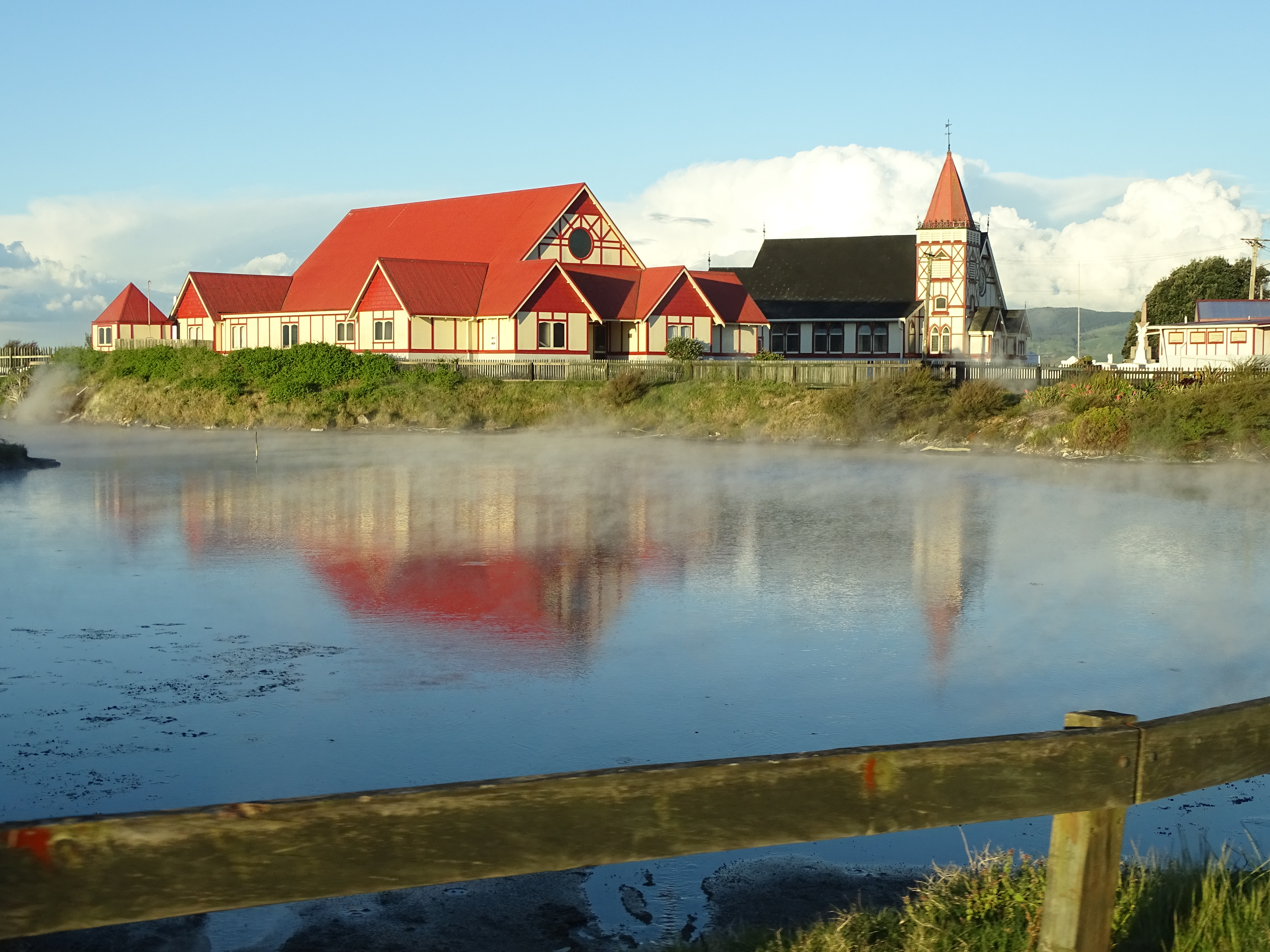
...as viewed from across the water in early spring.

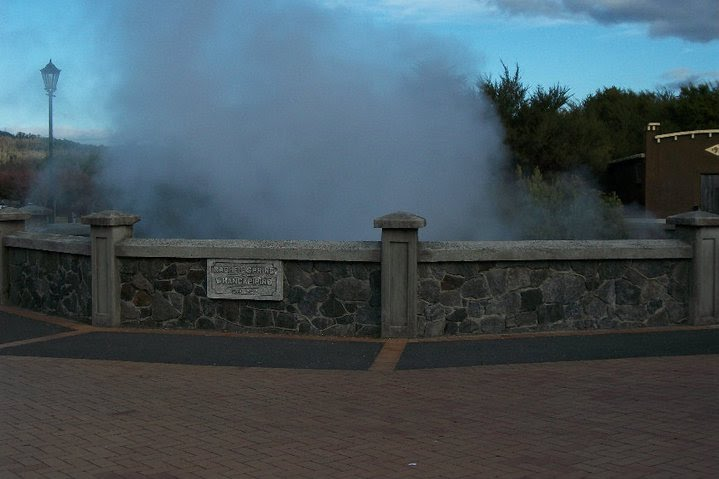
Hot springs present in much of Rotorua

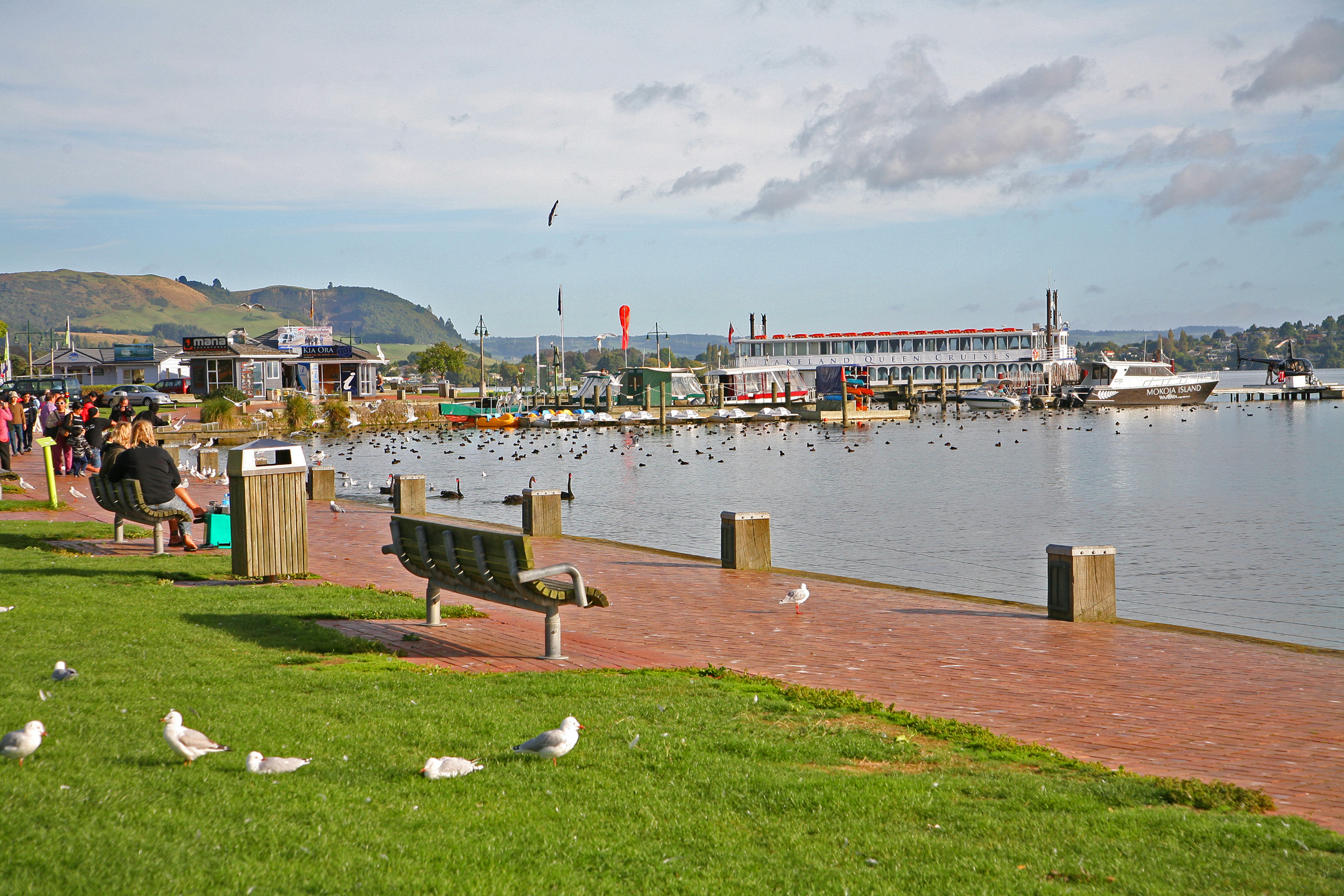
Beside Lake Rotorua

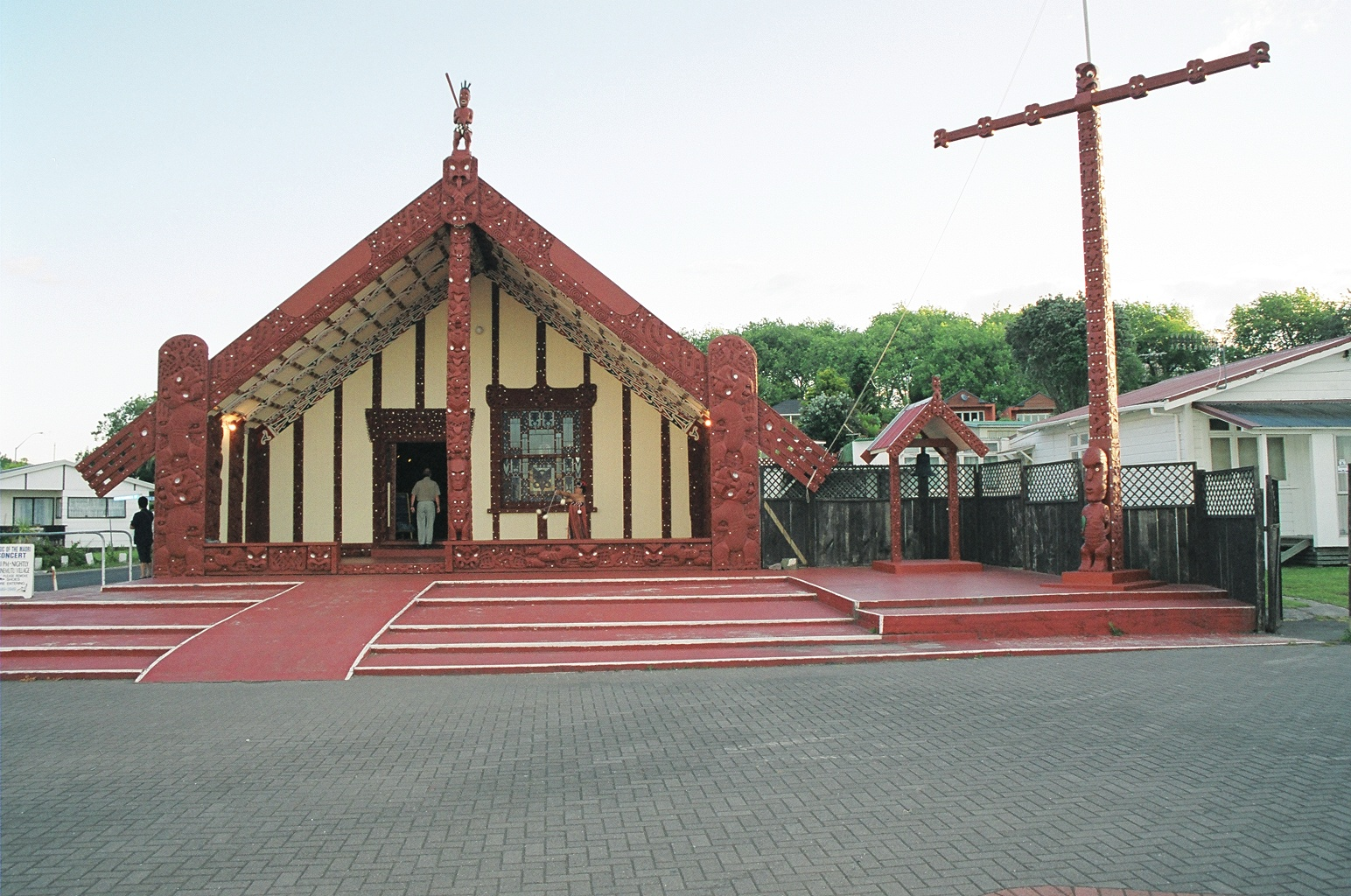
Te Papaiouru Marae in Ohinemutu, January 2001

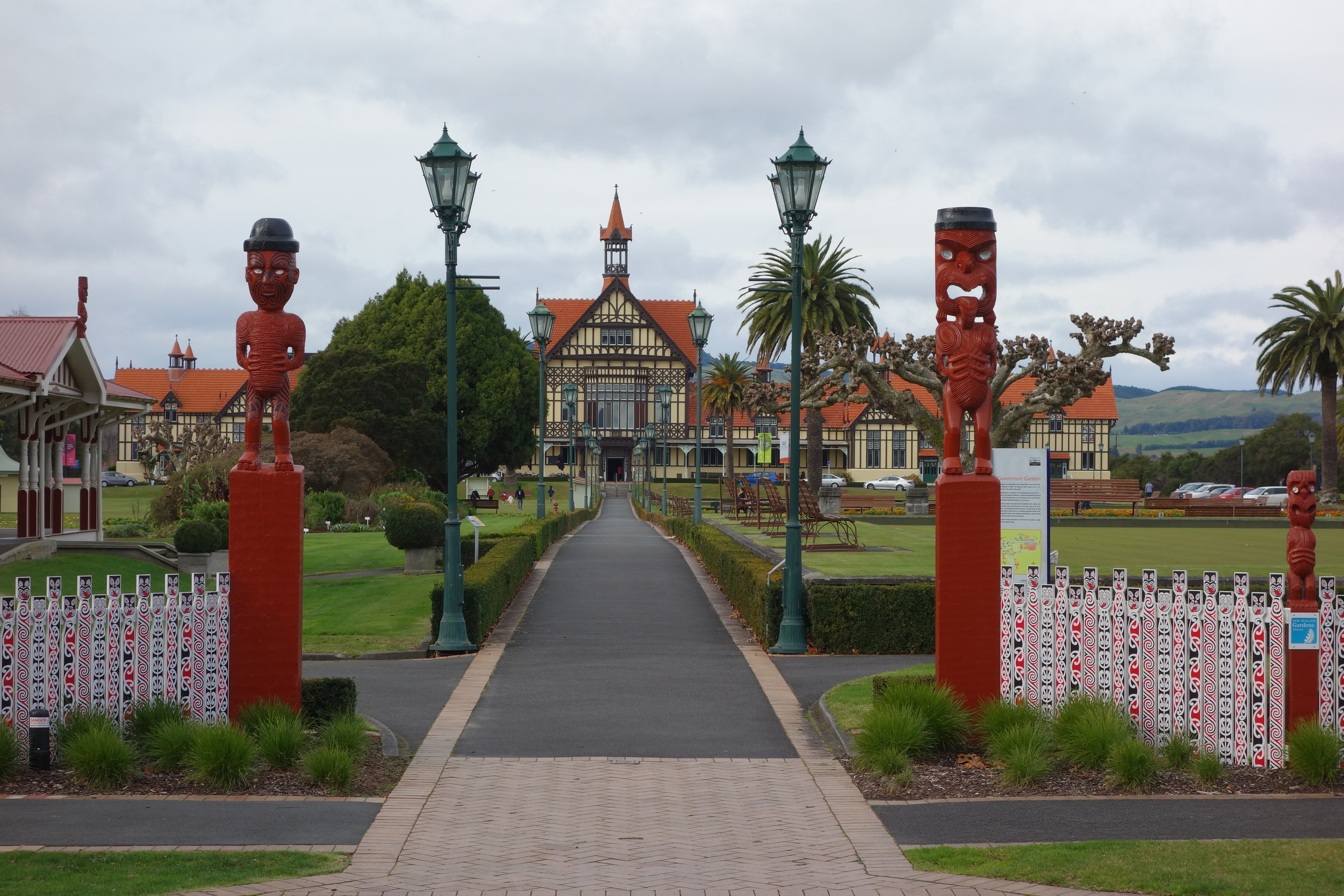
The Government Gardens

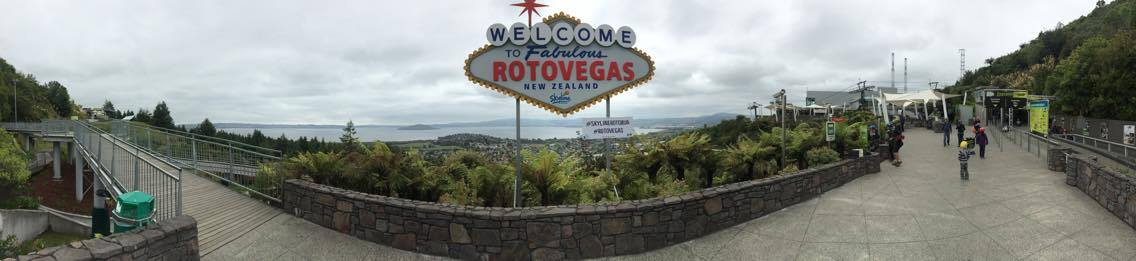
A panoramic view of Rotorua taken at the top of Mt Ngongotahā, December 2015

== Transport ==
=== Road ===
Rotorua is served by state highways 5, 30, and 30A, and the Thermal Explorer Highway touring route, with state highways 33 and 36 terminating on the outskirts of the city.

State Highway 5, running concurrently with the Thermal Explorer Highway, is the main north–south route through Rotorua, bypassing the city centre to the west. North of the city at the suburb of Ngongotahā, State Highway 36 splits off to provide a route to Tauranga via Pyes Pa, while State Highway 5 turns westward, connecting to State Highway 1 at Tīrau and providing the main route into Rotorua from Hamilton and Auckland. To the south, State Highway 5 provides the main route from Taupō, Hawke's Bay, Manawatū, and Wellington.

State Highway 30 runs southwest to northeast through the city. It enters the city in the southwest (running concurrently with SH 5), before crossing the southern suburbs to the shore of Lake Rotorua east of the city centre. It then runs through the suburb of Te Ngae, before splitting off SH 33 to continue eastwards.

State Highway 30A runs northwest to southeast, connecting State Highways 5 and 30 with each other via the city centre.

=== Bus ===
Rotorua has a local bus service, with 11 routes under the Baybus brand, serving the Rotorua urban area, mostly at half-hourly intervals, operated by Reesby Buses. Bike racks were introduced in 2017 and Bee Cards for fares on 27 July 2020. Trial commuter services between Rotorua and Tauranga are running in each direction until the end of 2021. The city is also served by InterCity and services to local tourist sites.

==== History ====
Edwin Robertson, who died aged 74 in 1931, started with pack horses in 1869 and ran coaches from 1873. In 1902, the Tauranga route was sold and became Robertson & Co, then, about 1903, Rotorua Motor Coaching Co. Ltd. In 1904, Hot Lakes Transport, which ran trips to Taupō, Waiotapu and all the lakes, and Rotorua Motor Coaching added motor cars to their fleets of coaches. In 1905 E. Robertson & Co moved from Ohinemutu to the new town, close to the new railway station, which remained the main stop until InterCity moved to their stop from Hinemoa / Fenton Street to the Tourism Office in 1995. The last coach ran in 1919. When Hot Lakes Transport's assets were sold in 1920, they had 10 coaches and 3 motor cars. In September 1920, Rotorua Motor Transport Co. was formed and took over Hot Lakes Transport Co. and Rotorua Motor Coaching Co, continuing with similar services. In 1926, a consortium of local operators formed Rotorua Bus Co. During 1922, Kusab's transport company became K Motors, which was taken over by the railways in 1938. Rotorua Motor Transport and Rotorua Bus Co followed in 1940 and all became part of New Zealand Railways Road Services.

=== Air ===
Rotorua Regional Airport is located 9 km (6 mi) northeast of the city centre, off State Highway 30. Air New Zealand provides daily turbo-prop flights between Rotorua and Auckland, Wellington, and Christchurch airports. Previously Qantas also operated Boeing 737 aircraft from Christchurch, but upon their departure from domestic flights in New Zealand this was discontinued.

Scenic and chartered flights in both helicopters and float planes are operated by Volcanic Air, who are based on Rotorua's lake front.

From 2009 to 2015 there was also an international link, with direct Sydney to Rotorua flights.

=== Rail ===
Rotorua is connected to the rail network by the Rotorua Branch line from Putāruru. Until 8 October 2001, passenger trains ran from Auckland to Rotorua via Hamilton daily using Silver Fern railcars, terminating north of the town centre at Koutu (the original station on Amohau Street was closed and relocated to Koutu on 18 August 1989). However, owing to poor advertising of the service and the location of the station being a 15-minute walk from the town centre in an industrial area, passenger services stopped in October 2001. Freight services on the line declined over the decades until the nightly freight service stopped in June 2000, largely due to a continual move of freight and passengers onto road transport using ever-improving highways in the region. The line is currently disused.

== Education ==
=== Tertiary ===
Rotorua is home to the central campus of Toi Ohomai Institute of Technology, which provides a range of certificates, diplomas and a limited number of degree-level programmes. The largest programmes on offer are Māori language, nursing, forestry, business, computing, tourism and hospitality. As of June 2022, Toi Ohomai Institute of Technology is a business division of Te Pūkenga – New Zealand Institute of Skills and Technology.

=== Secondary ===
Rotorua has five secondary schools:

- John Paul College, a co-educational, state-integrated Catholic school for Years 7–13 with about 1200 students
- Rotorua Boys' High School, a state boys school for Years 9–13 with about 1000 students
- Rotorua Girls' High School, a state girls school for Years 9–13 with about 600 students
- Rotorua Lakes High School serving the eastern suburbs. A co-educational state school for Years 9–13 with about 700 students
- Western Heights High School serving the western suburbs. A co-educational state school for Years 9–13 with about 1200 students

Students can also attend Te Rangihakahaka Centre for Science and Techbnology, a Māori- and English-medium special character school from years 1–10. It currently has around 100 students. Students here need to attend a mainstream secondary school or Kura Kaupapa Māori for their senior secondary schooling.

=== Kura Kaupapa Māori (Māori language immersion schools) ===
Rotorua has four Kura Kaupapa Māori:

- Te Wharekura o Ngāti Rongomai years 0–13 with about 115 students in eastern Rotorua
- Te Kura Kaupapa Māori O Te Koutu years 0–13 with about 240 students in western Rotorua
- Te Kura Kaupapa Māori O Ruamata years 0–13 with about 240 students in semi-rural eastern Rotorua
- Te Kura Kaupapa Māori O Hurungaterangi years 0–8 with about 80 students in central Rotorua

== Media ==
Rotorua has several media organisations, including the Rotorua Daily Post, More FM Rotorua and The Hits Rotorua.

== Sister cities ==
Rotorua's sister cities are:

- Beppu, Japan
- Klamath Falls, United States
- Lake Macquarie, Australia
- Wuzhong (Suzhou), China

== Notable people ==
- Valerie Adams, Olympic shot putter
- Steven Adams, basketball player
- Israel Adesanya, mixed martial artist, former UFC Middleweight Champion
- Michael Barker, drummer
- Jean Batten, aviator
- Sam Bewley, Olympic cyclist
- Manu Bennett, actor
- Trent Boult, New Zealand cricketer
- Simeon Brown, New Zealand politician
- Scott Curry, All Blacks 7s, Bay of Plenty 7s
- Cliff Curtis, actor
- Julian Dean, road racing cyclist
- Mike Delany, rugby union player, All Black
- Dame Susan Devoy, squash player
- Tom Donnelly, All Black, rugby union player
- Alan Duff, writer
- Gary Jeshel Forrester, musician, writer, academic
- Jack Foster, Olympic marathon runner
- Ian George, artist of Cook Islands descent.
- Kay George, artist based in Cook Islands and New Zealand
- Tony Gordon, rugby league player and coach
- Bevan Hari, hockey player
- Dylan Hartley, rugby union player (For the English National Team.)
- Tame Iti, Māori activist
- David Kosoof, Olympic hockey player
- Danny Lee, professional golfer
- Ranginui Parewahawaha Leonard, New Zealand weaver, farmer and kuia
- Dennis List, poet and writer
- Angus Hikairo Macfarlane, educator
- Gina Matchitt, Māori jeweller, weaver and artist
- Steve McDowall, All Black
- Hinematau McNeill (also writing as Naomi Te Hiini) academic and treaty negotiator
- Jon Mark, Musician. solo artist and co-founder of Mark-Almond
- Tony Marsh, rugby union player (for French national team)
- Elizabeth Marvelly, soprano
- Liam Messam, rugby union player (for Waikato and NZ)
- Sir Howard Morrison, entertainer
- Temuera Morrison, actor.
- Craig Newby, All Black
- Caleb Ralph, All Black
- William Ripia, rugby union player (Wellington Hurricanes, Western Force, Bay of Plenty, Otago Highlanders, Maori All Black)
- Joe Royal, rugby union player (Bay of Plenty Steamers and Māori All Blacks)
- Ben Sandford, Olympic men's skeleton racer
- Wayne "Buck" Shelford, former All Black
- Miriama Smith, actress
- Sir Peter Tapsell, politician
- Te Pokiha Taranui, tribal leader and soldier
- Ngahuia Te Awekotuku, academic, scholar activist, Emeritus Professor
- Sir Gordon Tietjens, New Zealand and Samoan Sevens rugby coach
- Jared Waerea-Hargreaves, rugby league player (Sydney Roosters and New Zealand Kiwis)
- Dean Whare, rugby league player (Penrith Panthers and New Zealand Kiwis)
