= Westbrook, Rotorua =

Coordinates: 38.152086°S 176.215430°E

Westbrook is a suburb of Rotorua in the Bay of Plenty Region of New Zealand's North Island.

== Education ==
Westbrook School is a co-educational state primary school for Year 1 to 6 students, with a roll of 489 as of July 2025.
