= HGX =

HGX may stand for:

- Nvidia HGX, an AI computer by Nvidia
- IBM 3477/3487 model HGX, a historic terminal computer from IBM with a green display
- HGX, a container wagon class in New Zealand
