= Te Maunga =

Suburb of Tauranga, New Zealand

- Suburb
- Interactive map of Te Maunga
- Coordinates: 37.682961°S 176.229468°E
- Country: New Zealand
- City: Tauranga
- Local authority: Tauranga City Council
- Electoral ward: Arataki General Ward

Area
  - Land: 349 ha (860 acres)

Population (June 2025)
  - Total: 8,970
  - Density: 2,570/km^{2} (6,660/sq mi)

Arataki		(Bay of Plenty)
	Te Maunga
Baypark	Kairua	Papamoa

Te Maunga is a suburb of Tauranga in the Bay of Plenty, in New Zealand's North Island.

A large timber fire broke out in Te Maunga in November 2019.

The area experienced surface flooding in June 2020.

In September 2020, the New Zealand Transport Agency began work on a new traffic interchange. The interchange opened in stages from 2022, with State Highway 2 fully separated from local roads in October 2023.

== Demographics ==
Te Maunga covers 3.49 km^{2} (1.35 sq mi) and had an estimated population of 8,970 as of June 2025, with a population density of 2,570 people per km^{2}.

Historical population
Year	Pop.	±% p.a.
2006	5,616	—
2013	5,874	+0.64%
2018	7,386	+4.69%
2023	8,448	+2.72%

Te Maunga had a population of 8,448 in the 2023 New Zealand census, an increase of 1,062 people (14.4%) since the 2018 census, and an increase of 2,574 people (43.8%) since the 2013 census. There were 3,777 males, 4,656 females, and 15 people of other genders in 3,549 dwellings. 2.0% of people identified as LGBTIQ+. There were 1,311 people (15.5%) aged under 15 years, 1,200 (14.2%) aged 15 to 29, 3,267 (38.7%) aged 30 to 64, and 2,670 (31.6%) aged 65 or older.

People could identify as more than one ethnicity. The results were 84.5% European (Pākehā); 16.9% Māori; 3.0% Pasifika; 5.9% Asian; 2.0% Middle Eastern, Latin American and African New Zealanders (MELAA); and 2.0% other, which includes people giving their ethnicity as "New Zealander". English was spoken by 96.9%, Māori by 4.0%, Samoan by 0.4%, and other languages by 9.7%. No language could be spoken by 2.0% (e.g. too young to talk). New Zealand Sign Language was known by 0.3%. The percentage of people born overseas was 23.0, compared with 28.8% nationally.

Religious affiliations were 36.3% Christian, 0.9% Hindu, 0.2% Islam, 1.8% Māori religious beliefs, 0.4% Buddhist, 0.2% New Age, and 1.2% other religions. People who answered that they had no religion were 52.3%, and 6.7% of people did not answer the census question.

Of those at least 15 years old, 1,683 (23.6%) people had a bachelor's or higher degree, 3,681 (51.6%) had a post-high school certificate or diploma, and 1,791 (25.1%) people exclusively held high school qualifications. 780 people (10.9%) earned over $100,000 compared to 12.1% nationally. The employment status of those at least 15 was 2,952 (41.4%) full-time, 897 (12.6%) part-time, and 162 (2.3%) unemployed.

Individual statistical areas
Name	Area (km^{2})	Population	Density (per km^{2})	Dwellings	Median age	Median income
Te Maunga North	1.17	3,354	2,867	1,446	42.0 years	$35,100
Te Maunga South	0.98	2,163	2,207	843	44.6 years	$39,100
Pacific Lakes	1.34	2,931	2,187	1,260	52.7 years	$38,900
New Zealand					38.1 years	$41,500

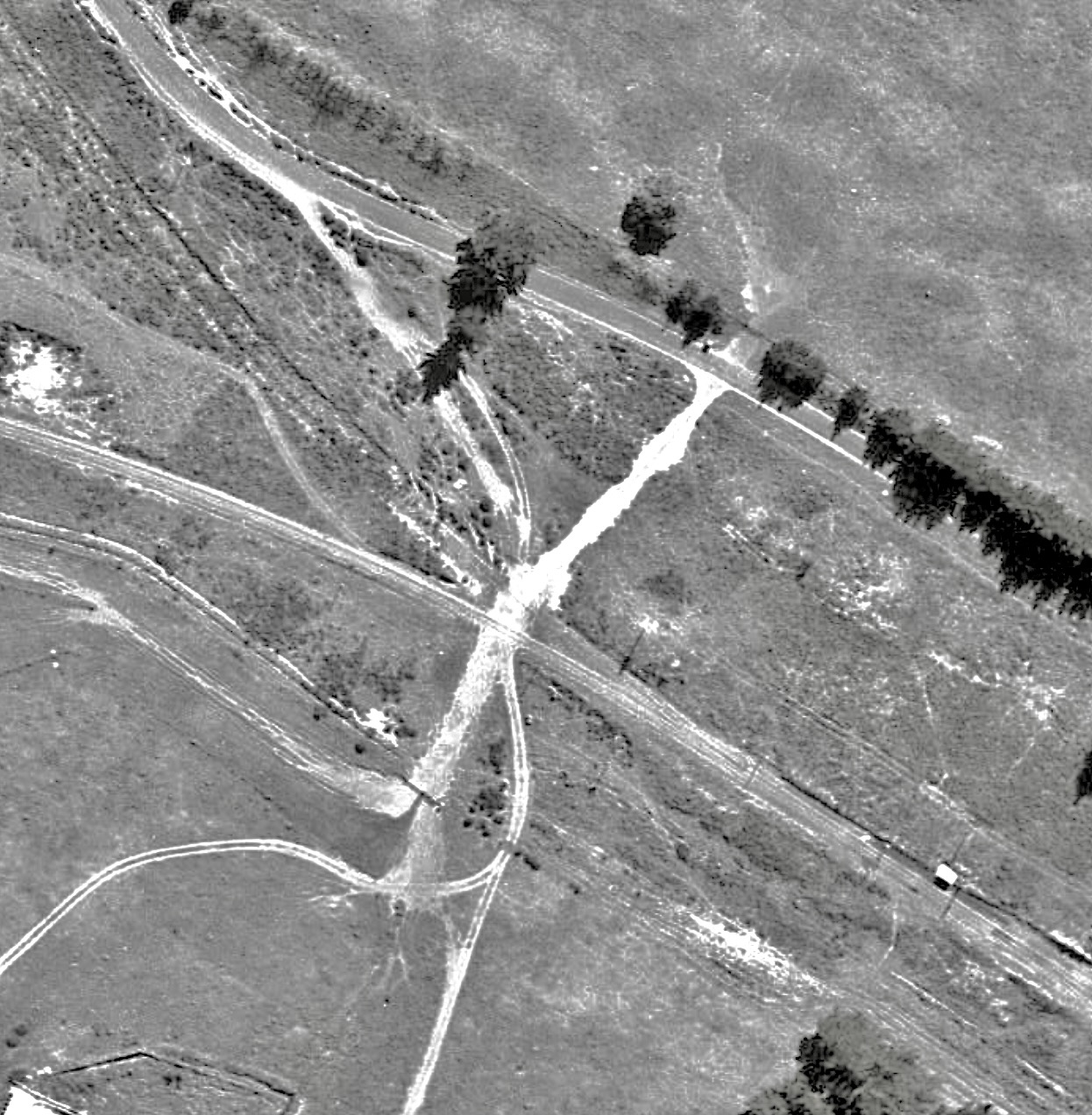
Te Maunga 1951

== Te Maunga railway station ==
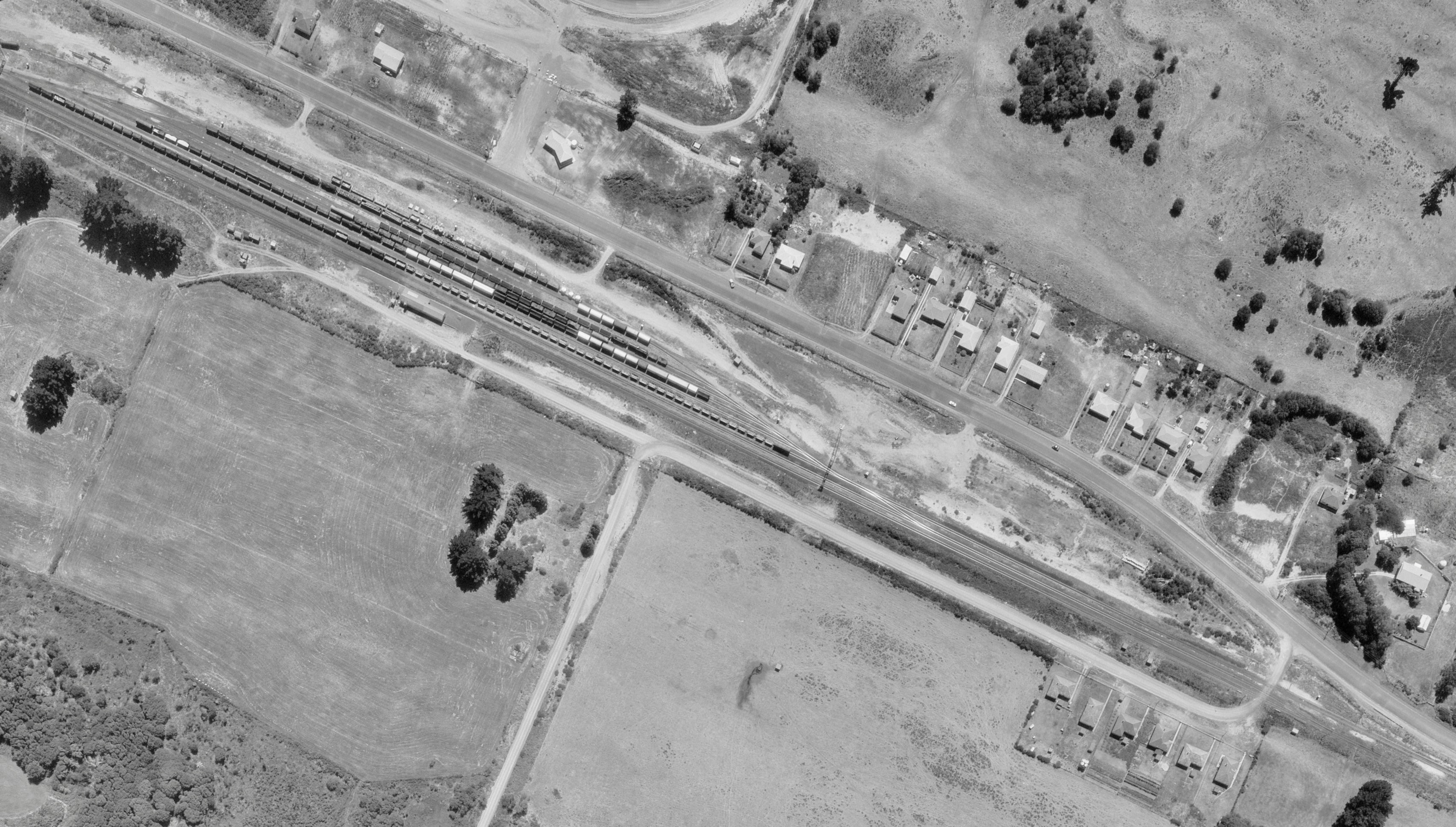
Te Maunga 1968

Te Maunga railway station was on the East Coast Main Trunk (ECMT), at the junction with the 4 mi 24 ch (6.9 km) Mount Maunganui Branch, opened on 16 October 1913 and closed to passengers on 11 September 1967 and to goods on 9 December 1979.

=== History ===
Te Maunga opened with the 13 mi (21 km) Mount Maunganui-Te Puke section, formally opened on 16 October 1913.

In 1924 plans were made to provide a building, but it was delayed in 1926, when the Harbour Board objected to closing the Maunganui branch. By the time the whole of the ECMT opened on 28 March 1928 Te Maunga had a cart approach to the station, an engine reversing triangle and a passing loop for 46 wagons. In 1932 tenders were invited for a shelter, and in 1933 part of the original Maunganui station building was moved to be the station building at Te Maunga for £300, though as late as 1940, a request was made for platform accommodation. In 1937 NZR by arrangement with PWD was frequently running excursion trains to Mount Maunganui, but It was just a railway formation by 1939, and in 1942 the Mount Maunganui Branch was described as overgrown with rubbish and, at the Airport Road crossing, the line was buried under six inches of road metal. In 1938 the Town Board asked for Te Maunga to be changed to Mount Maunganui, which happened from 14 January 1946 and the ground was also raised to make it easier for passengers getting on and off trains. From 22 February 1954 the name was changed back to Te Maunga. On 23 August 1955 the Mount Maunganui branch was reopened and the Public Works Department (PWD) handed it over to New Zealand Railways (NZR) in January 1958. 6 railway houses were built in 1956. In 1960 plans were made for a marshalling yard at Te Maunga. In 1963 the platform was sealed and the station building was enlarged by 36 ft (11 m), with a verandah along the 35 ft (11 m) frontage of the booking office and waiting room. In December 1986 tenders were called for the sale and removal of the station building. A reversing triangle was built in 1973 at the junction of the Maunganui branch.

	Former adjoining stations	
Matapihi; Line open, station closed 3.77 km (2.34 mi); Towards Hamilton	East Coast Main Trunk	Kairua; Line open, station closed 4.3 km (2.7 mi); Towards Tāneatua
Mount Maunganui; Line open, station closed 6.5 km (4.0 mi); Towards Paeroa	Mount Maunganui Branch	Terminus
