= Moturiki Island =

Island in New Zealand

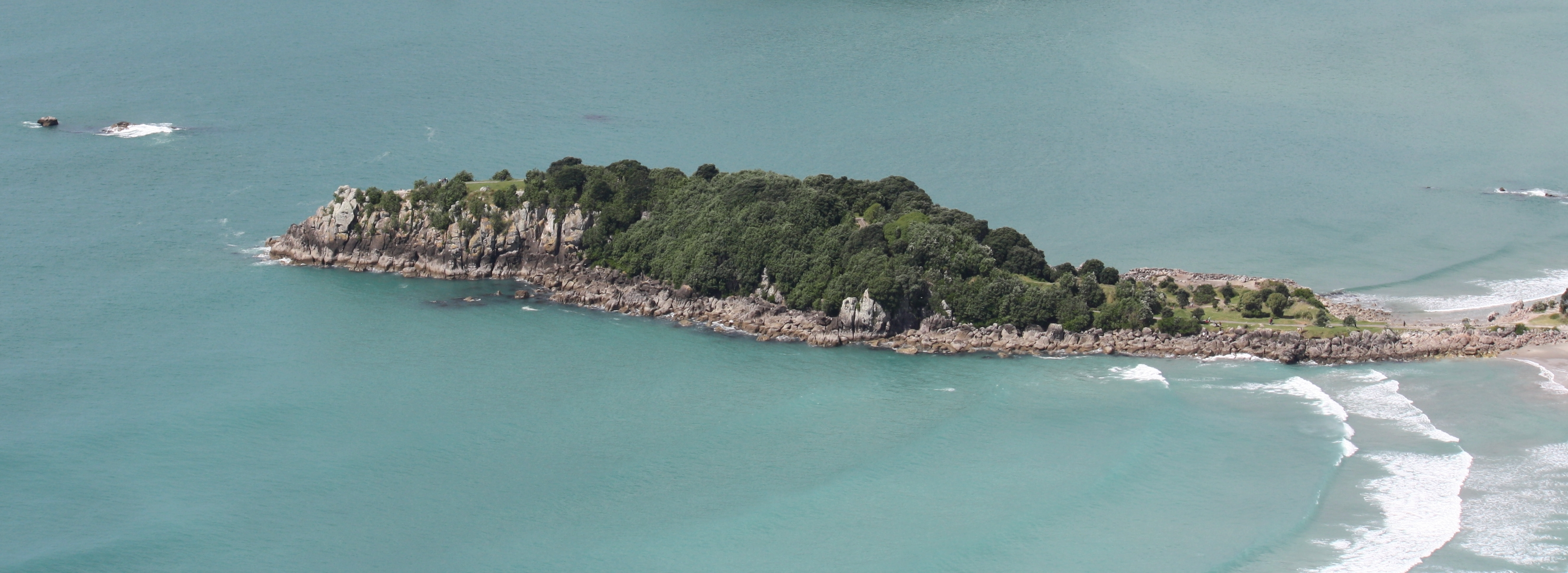
- Moturiki Island, Mount Maunganui
- Interactive map of Moturiki Island

Geography
- Location: Mount Maunganui, New Zealand
- Coordinates: 37°38′S 176°11′E

Administration
- New Zealand

Demographics
- Population: Uninhabited

Moturiki Island is a small island located just off Mount Maunganui beach, in the North Island of New Zealand. The island is connected to the beach by an artificial land bridge. NIWA maintains a tide meter on Moturiki Island. Moturiki Island offers walking, bird watching, fishing, and rock climbing opportunities.

In 1966, Marineland Limited built an aquarium called "Marineland" on the island; this closed in May 1981. Later, in 1981, "Marineland" was reconstructed into "Leisure Island", a water park with swimming pools, bumper boats, and a hydro slide. The water park operated until 1990, when it was removed from the island.

== See also ==
- Desert island
- List of islands of New Zealand
