= Anne Speir =

Television producer from New Zealand

Anne Elizabeth Speir is a former television producer from New Zealand.

In the 1970s Speir was the first female professional lifeguard on Mount Maunganui beach.

Speir joined South Pacific Television in the late 1970s and later moved to Television New Zealand where she worked on A Week of It. She also worked for Maori Television and produced Takataapui, a gay lifestyle series, in 2004.

Speir has also served as the chairwoman of the Hero Trust, which organised gay pride parades in Auckland from 1992 to 2001.
