= Kairua =

Suburb of Tauranga, New Zealand

- Suburb
- Interactive map of Kairua
- Coordinates: 37.710°S 176.253°E
- Country: New Zealand
- City: Tauranga
- Local authority: Tauranga City Council
- Electoral ward: Arataki General Ward

Area
  - Land: 1,293 ha (3,200 acres)

Population (June 2025)
  - Total: 860
  - Density: 67/km^{2} (170/sq mi)

Arataki		Papamoa
(Rangataua Bay)	Kairua
Welcome Bay		Otawa

Kairua is a rural area of Tauranga in the Bay of Plenty region of New Zealand's North Island. State Highway 2 runs along its northern side, and crosses it at the northeast. Baypark Stadium is in the northwest of the area. The East Coast Main Trunk railway runs along the south side of SH 2.

Kairua railway station opened on 2 September 1928, and closed 28 September 1957. The road between the railway station and Mount Maunganui was sealed in 1948.

== Demographics ==
Baypark-Kairua statistical area covers 12.93 km^{2} (4.99 sq mi) and had an estimated population of 860 as of June 2025, with a population density of 67 people per km^{2}.

Historical population
Year	Pop.	±% p.a.
2006	501	—
2013	468	−0.97%
2018	588	+4.67%
2023	753	+5.07%

Baypark-Kairua had a population of 753 in the 2023 New Zealand census, an increase of 165 people (28.1%) since the 2018 census, and an increase of 285 people (60.9%) since the 2013 census. There were 375 males, 375 females, and 6 people of other genders in 231 dwellings. 4.0% of people identified as LGBTIQ+. The median age was 31.4 years (compared with 38.1 years nationally). There were 126 people (16.7%) aged under 15 years, 225 (29.9%) aged 15 to 29, 309 (41.0%) aged 30 to 64, and 90 (12.0%) aged 65 or older.

People could identify as more than one ethnicity. The results were 45.4% European (Pākehā); 53.8% Māori; 5.6% Pasifika; 11.2% Asian; 2.8% Middle Eastern, Latin American and African New Zealanders (MELAA); and 0.8% other, which includes people giving their ethnicity as "New Zealander". English was spoken by 96.4%, Māori by 21.1%, and other languages by 12.7%. No language could be spoken by 1.6% (e.g. too young to talk). The percentage of people born overseas was 23.5, compared with 28.8% nationally.

Religious affiliations were 23.5% Christian, 2.8% Hindu, 27.1% Māori religious beliefs, 0.4% Buddhist, 1.2% New Age, and 5.2% other religions. People who answered that they had no religion were 34.7%, and 6.4% of people did not answer the census question.

Of those at least 15 years old, 96 (15.3%) people had a bachelor's or higher degree, 330 (52.6%) had a post-high school certificate or diploma, and 201 (32.1%) people exclusively held high school qualifications. The median income was $36,900, compared with $41,500 nationally. 45 people (7.2%) earned over $100,000 compared to 12.1% nationally. The employment status of those at least 15 was 333 (53.1%) full-time, 81 (12.9%) part-time, and 30 (4.8%) unemployed.
