= Mount Maunganui =

Suburb of Tauranga, New Zealand

Coordinates: 37.659757°S 176.214844°E

- Suburb
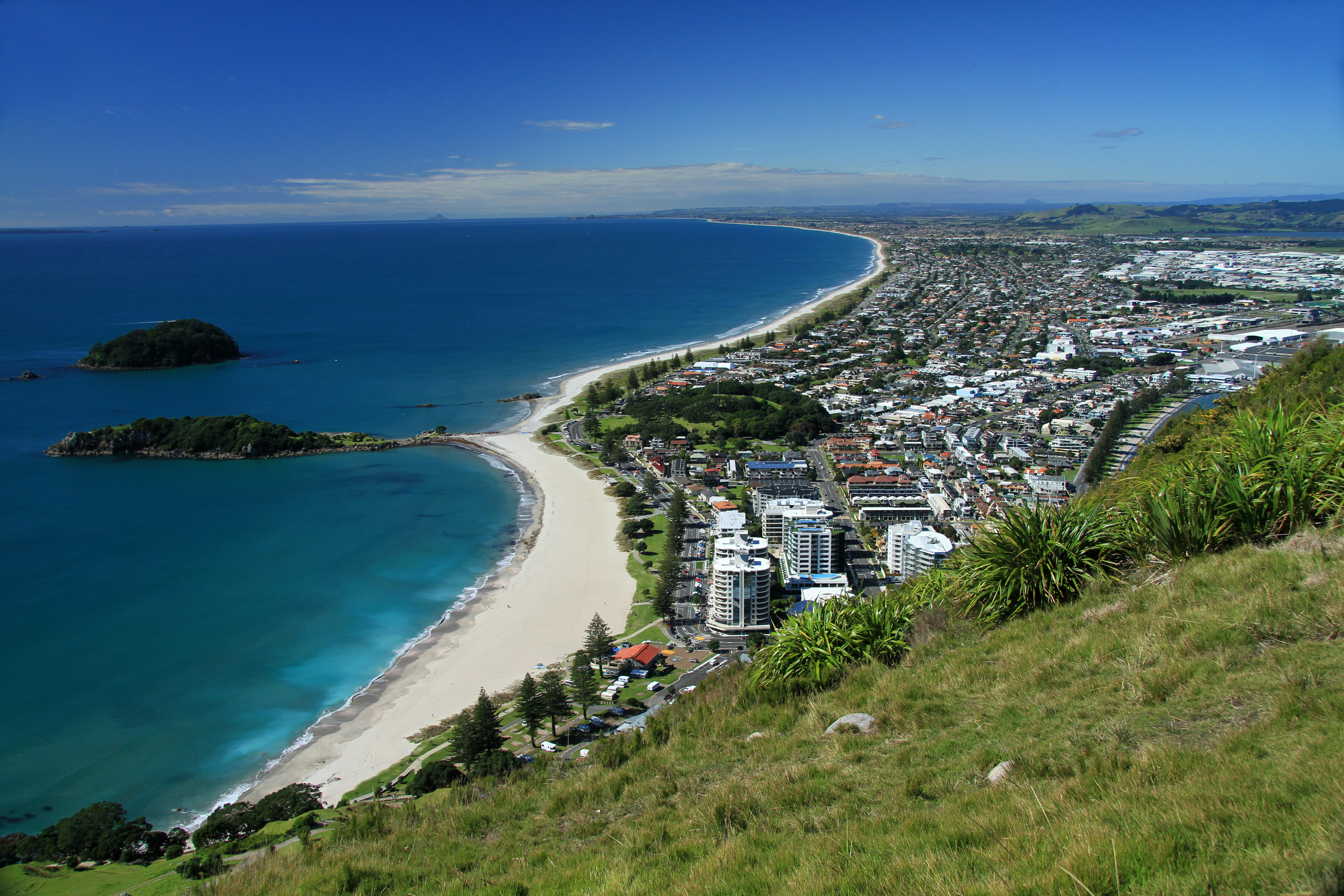
- Mount Maunganui in autumn
- Interactive map of Mount Maunganui
- Country: New Zealand
- Region: Bay of Plenty
- City: Tauranga
- Local authority: Tauranga City Council
- Electoral ward: Mauao/Mount Maunganui General Ward

Area
  - Land: 1,621 ha (4,010 acres)

Population (June 2025)
  - Total: 21,810
  - Density: 1,345/km^{2} (3,485/sq mi)
- Airports: Tauranga Airport

		(Bay of Plenty)
(Tauranga Harbour)	Mount Maunganui	Omanu
	Matapihi

Mount Maunganui (Māori pronunciation: [ˈmaʉŋaˌnʉi], locally /ˌmɒŋəˈnuːi/) is a major residential, commercial and industrial suburb of Tauranga located on a peninsula to the north-east of Tauranga's city centre. It was an independent town from Tauranga until the completion of the Tauranga Harbour Bridge in 1988, which connects Mount Maunganui to Tauranga's central business district.

Mount Maunganui is also the name of the large lava dome which was formed by the upwelling of rhyolite lava about two to three million years ago. It is officially known by its Māori name Mauao, but is colloquially known in New Zealand simply as The Mount.

The New Zealand Ministry for Culture and Heritage gives a translation of "large mountain" for Maunganui.

== Geography ==
Mount Maunganui is located atop a sand bar that connects Mauao to the mainland, a geographical formation known as a tombolo. Because of this formation, the residents of Mount Maunganui have both a harbour beach (Pilot Bay) and an ocean beach with great surf, within a short distance. At the base of Mauao, the distance between the harbour and ocean side is a couple of blocks.

The ocean beach has Mauao or Mount Maunganui at its western end, and a man made land bridge connecting Moturiki Island at its eastern end.

Adjacent to Mount Maunganui on its south-eastern edge (from Sandhurst Drive onwards) is Papamoa Beach, another very large suburb of Tauranga. Papamoa Beach has a slightly larger population than Mount Maunganui, but doesn't have as many businesses as Mount Maunganui. Both suburbs are distinctly geographically separate from the rest of Tauranga by the Tauranga Harbour; two bridges (SH2 and SH29) and the winding Welcome Bay Road are the only connections by land to the central business district.

Mauao (The Mount) are other names for the hill which rises above the town. According to Maori legend, this hill was a pononga [slave] to a mountain called Otanewainuku. The conical headland which gives the town its name is 232 metres (761 ft) in height, and dominates the mostly flat surrounding countryside. It was formerly a Māori pā, and the remains of trenches can be seen in the ridges, as well as ancient shell middens. Today, it is open to the public year-round, and is a popular place to either walk around, or hike up. From the summit, a good stretch of coastline can be seen in either direction, as well as the Kaimai Range to the west.

== Demographics ==
Mount Maunganui covers 16.21 km^{2} (6.26 sq mi) and had an estimated population of 21,810 as of June 2025, with a population density of 1,345 people per km^{2}.

Historical population
Year	Pop.	±% p.a.
2006	19,092	—
2013	18,948	−0.11%
2018	20,658	+1.74%
2023	21,030	+0.36%
The 2006 population is for a larger area of 17.52 km^{2}. Source:

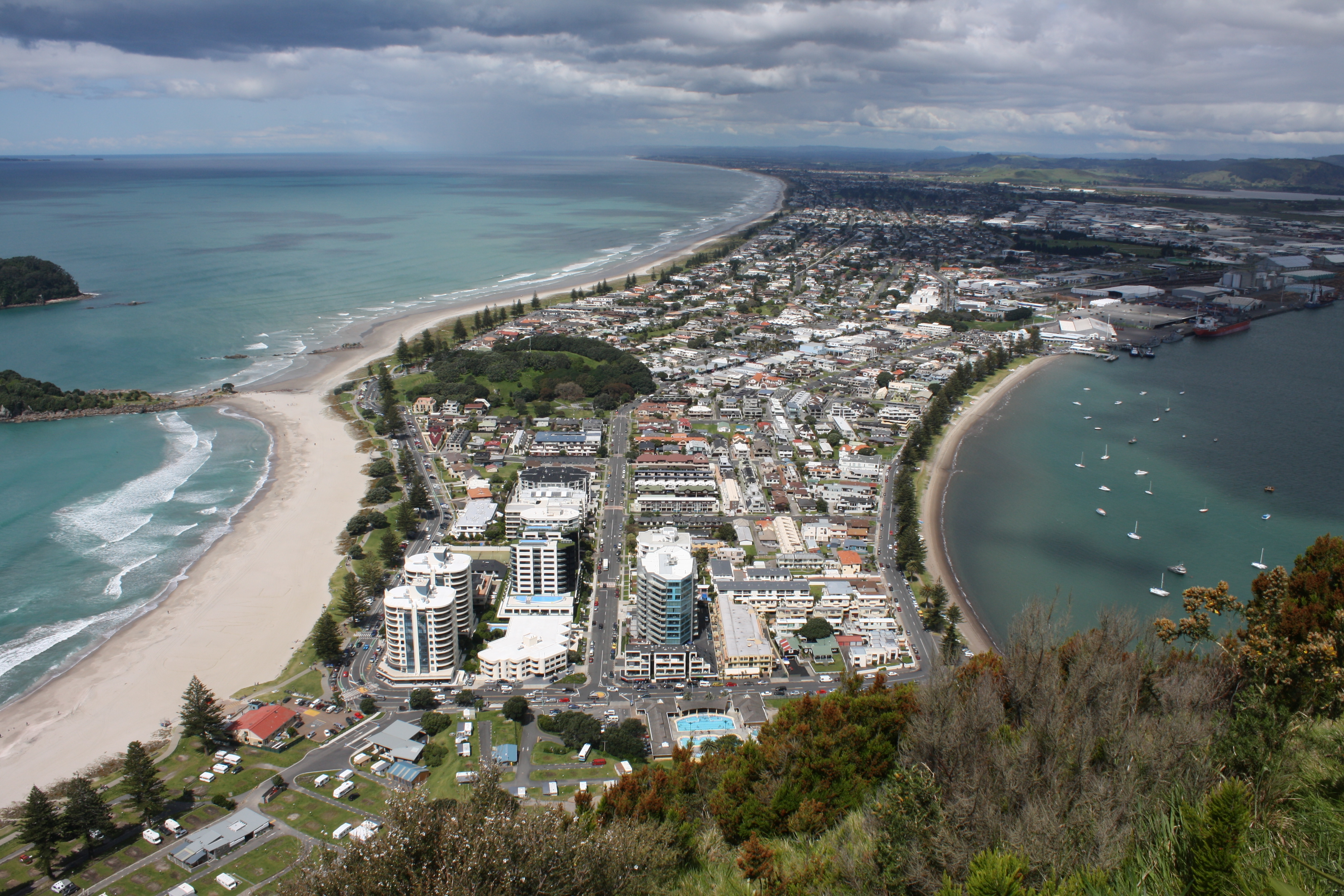
Township seen from top of Mount

Mount Maunganui had a population of 21,030 in the 2023 New Zealand census, an increase of 372 people (1.8%) since the 2018 census, and an increase of 2,082 people (11.0%) since the 2013 census. There were 9,948 males, 11,019 females, and 66 people of other genders in 8,316 dwellings. 2.6% of people identified as LGBTIQ+. The median age was 39.9 years (compared with 38.1 years nationally). There were 3,450 people (16.4%) aged under 15 years, 3,834 (18.2%) aged 15 to 29, 9,273 (44.1%) aged 30 to 64, and 4,473 (21.3%) aged 65 or older.

People could identify as more than one ethnicity. The results were 84.1% European (Pākehā); 18.0% Māori; 2.8% Pasifika; 4.9% Asian; 3.6% Middle Eastern, Latin American and African New Zealanders (MELAA); and 1.8% other, which includes people giving their ethnicity as "New Zealander". English was spoken by 96.9%, Māori by 3.8%, Samoan by 0.3%, and other languages by 10.3%. No language could be spoken by 2.0% (e.g. too young to talk). New Zealand Sign Language was known by 0.4%. The percentage of people born overseas was 22.3, compared with 28.8% nationally.

Religious affiliations were 29.8% Christian, 0.7% Hindu, 0.2% Islam, 1.4% Māori religious beliefs, 0.6% Buddhist, 0.4% New Age, 0.1% Jewish, and 1.2% other religions. People who answered that they had no religion were 59.7%, and 6.2% of people did not answer the census question.

Of those at least 15 years old, 5,073 (28.9%) people had a bachelor's or higher degree, 8,556 (48.7%) had a post-high school certificate or diploma, and 3,939 (22.4%) people exclusively held high school qualifications. The median income was $44,600, compared with $41,500 nationally. 2,469 people (14.0%) earned over $100,000 compared to 12.1% nationally. The employment status of those at least 15 was 8,787 (50.0%) full-time, 2,466 (14.0%) part-time, and 459 (2.6%) unemployed.

Individual statistical areas
Name	Area (km^{2})	Population	Density (per km^{2})	Dwellings	Median age	Median income
Mount Maunganui North	2.03	3,204	1,578	1,440	42.2 years	$50,900
Mount Maunganui South	0.94	2,844	3,026	1,086	39.3 years	$53,300
Mount Maunganui Central	6.91	225	37	99	48.0 years	$55,400
Omanu Beach	1.02	2,982	2,924	1,107	38.6 years	$47,800
Arataki North	2.16	3,201	1,482	1,212	39.9 years	$44,200
Arataki South	0.99	3,063	3,094	1,083	34.9 years	$43,500
Te Maunga North	1.17	3,354	2,867	1,446	42.0 years	$35,100
Te Maunga South	0.98	2,163	2,207	843	44.6 years	$39,100
New Zealand					38.1 years	$41,500

== Politics ==
Mount Maunganui was politically independent of Tauranga until the 1989 local government reforms.

In 1974, Bob Owens was mayor of both Mount Maunganui and Tauranga, a unique situation in local government in New Zealand. Owens favoured joining of the two municipalities. The election of 1974 was fought on this issue and Owens was defeated in the polls in Mount Maunganui with a landslide victory to Louis Kelvin O'Hara, at that time the youngest person elected mayor in New Zealand, who challenged him with the catch cry "why share a mayor?"

== History ==
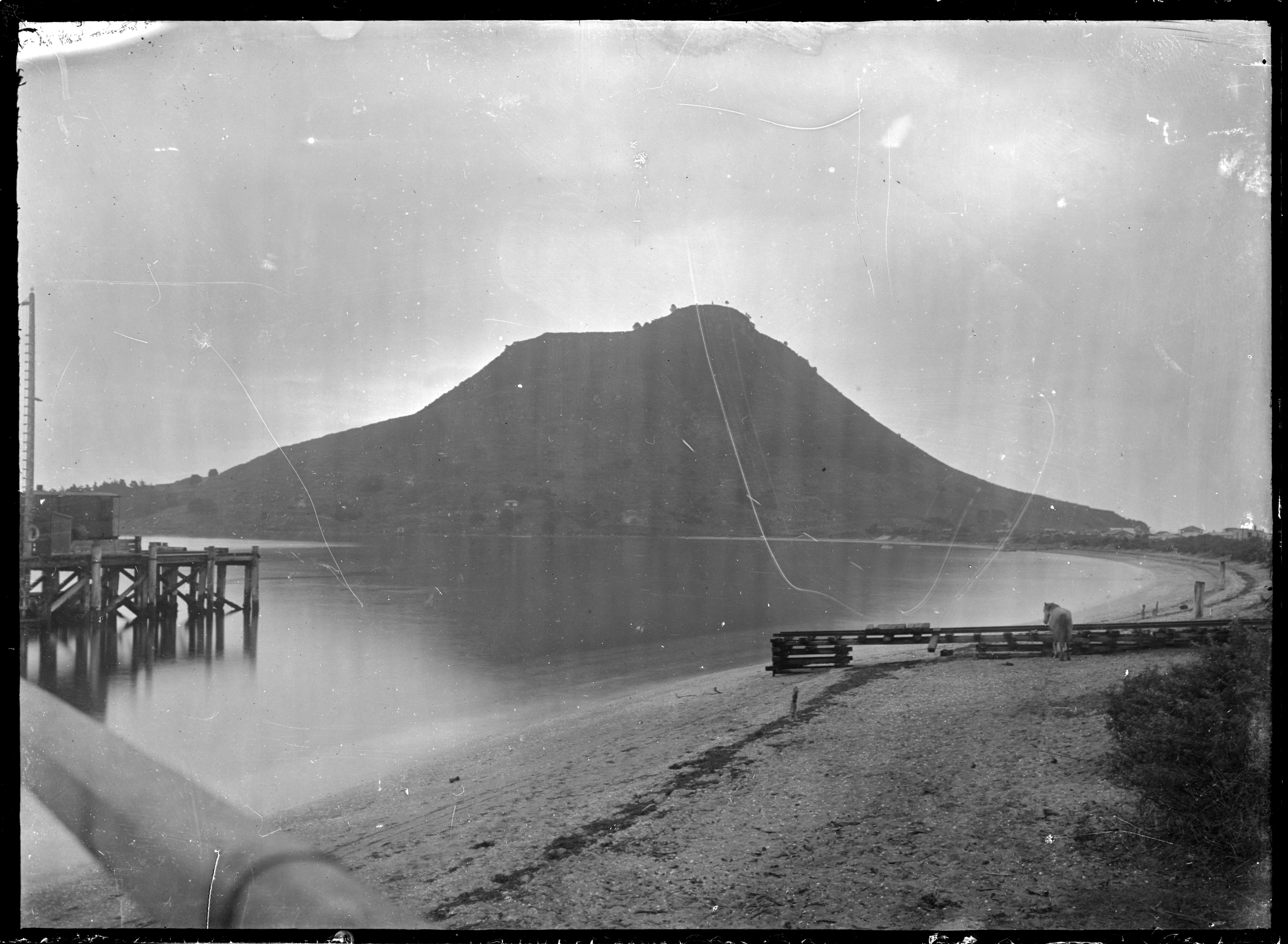
View of Mount Maunganui in 1924

Mount Maunganui was known colloquially as Maunganui until 1907; during the application process to formally name the area when the first subdivision of land was carried out, Maunganui was dismissed as being too similar to several other towns' names. One of the early settlers, J.C. Adams, then suggested three alternative names, which were Te Maire, Tamure (the Māori name for Snapper), and Rakataura, with the latter name selected by the Survey Department. The official name Rakataura never came into common use, as Maunganui had long been the unofficial name of the area. The name Mount Maunganui originated as a rebranding by early developers, who succeeded in changing the official name of the town from Rakataura. The current name is an example of a tautological place name, maunga being a Māori term for mountain (nui means "big").

Mount Maunganui fought fiercely and successfully during the 1950s to retain independence from Tauranga, then failed with the completion of the harbour bridge in 1988.

The former Mount Maunganui Borough Council set records in New Zealand as having never had a deficit in its history, something which Tauranga City Council has never achieved. Critics say the town was built by leveraging the commercial and industrial ratepayers, but Mount Maunganui was a forerunner in some areas and applied the user pays philosophy before it was common in New Zealand.

Anne Speir was the first female professional lifeguard at the beach. She later became a television producer.

The original house of early settler J.C. Adams, the first home built at Mount Maunganui, still stands at 4 Adams Avenue. The 1906 house is registered with Heritage New Zealand as a Category II historic building.

On 22 January 2026, during an intense storm, six people were killed after a landslide came down upon a campground at the base of Mount Maunganui. A landslide in nearby Welcome Bay also resulted in two deaths.

== Marae ==
The local Whareroa Marae and Rauru ki Tahi meeting house is a meeting place for the Ngāi Te Rangi hapū of Ngāti Kuku and Ngāi Tukairangi.

== Character ==
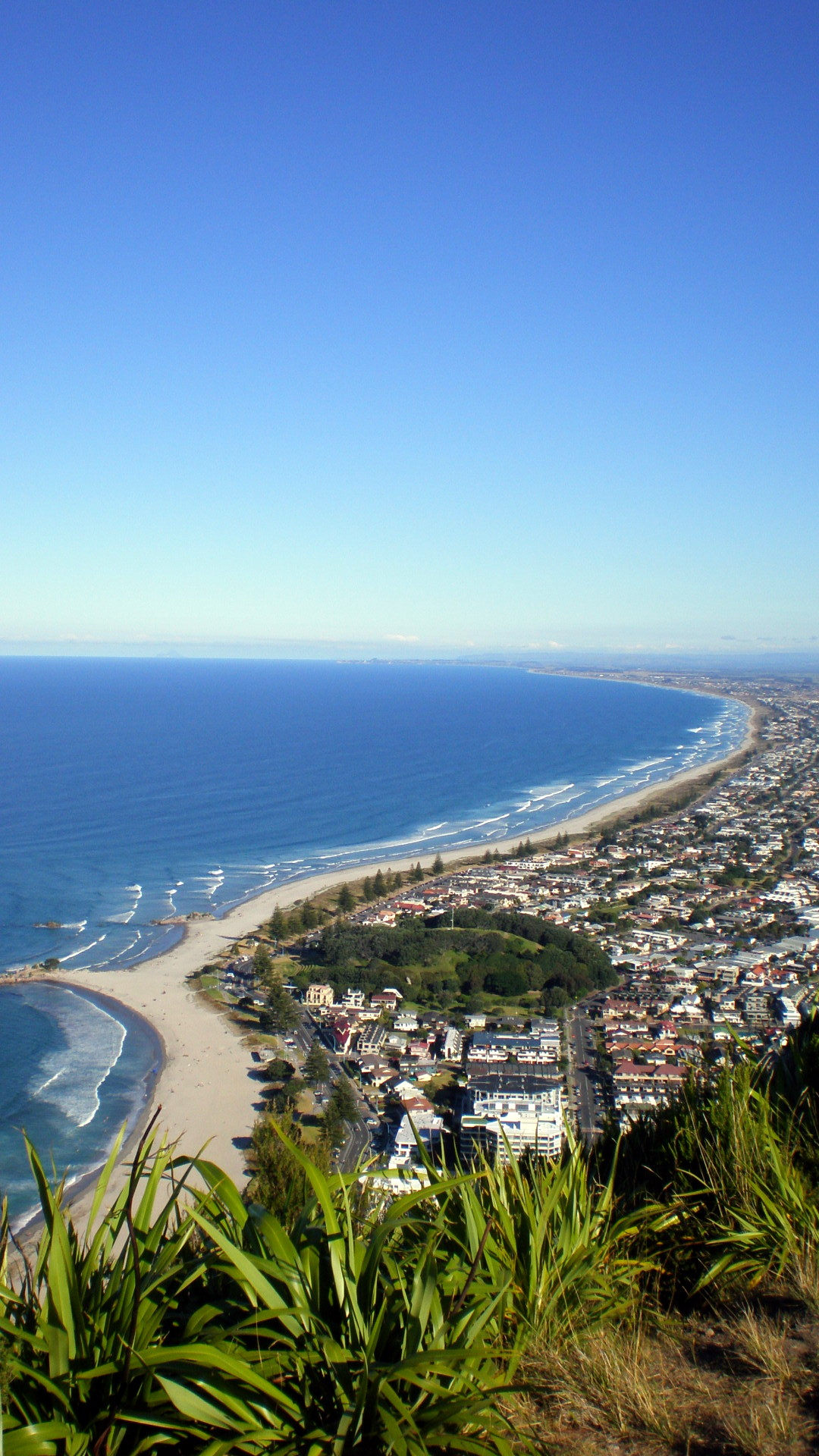
View from the summit of Mount Maunganui (Mauao)

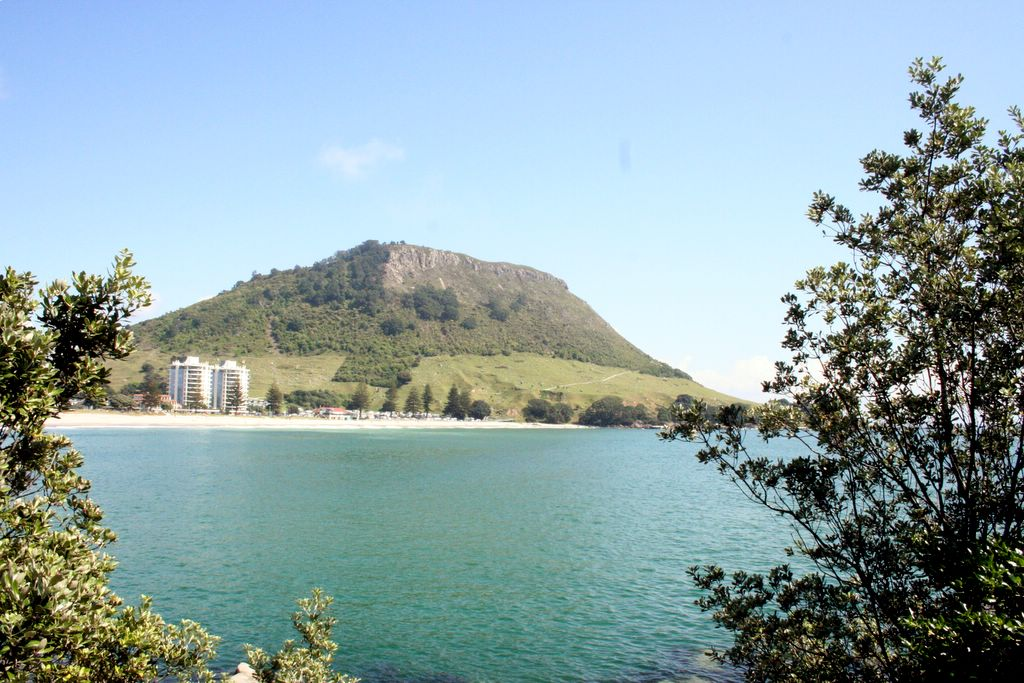
The mountain in summer

Mount Maunganui is regarded by many to be a coastal resort town, although Port of Tauranga, a major facility, is also partly located on the western (harbour) side. It is also well known for the quality of its surfing conditions, though parts of the beach are notoriously dangerous. The harbour bridge was opened in 1988, linking Mount Maunganui with Tauranga. The construction of a duplication bridge was completed in December 2009, forming a vital link in Tauranga and Mount Maunganui's growing motorway system.

A large container terminal and overseas wharf is located at Mount Maunganui. A branch railway from the East Coast Main Trunk railway runs between the Te Maunga and northern parts of the suburb.

Mount Maunganui also features the popular Bayfair Shopping Centre. The centre is one of the largest in the North Island outside Auckland and Wellington.

Mount Maunganui is a popular New Year destination, with over 20,000 people frequenting the suburb over the New Year period. Many festivities take place on and around the main beach in the north of the suburb.

As part of the Port of Tauranga is located in Mount Maunganui, there are many cruise ship visits annually to the suburb.

== Sport ==
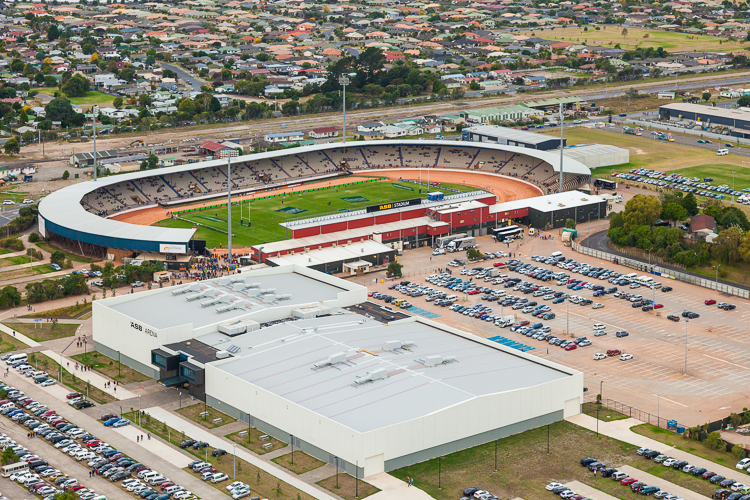
ASB Baypark Stadium

The suburb is home to the cricket ground Bay Oval, which held the 2018 ICC Under 19 Cricket World Cup final on 3 February 2018 as well as international cricket matches.

Every year Mount Maunganui hosts the Northern Regional Surf Championships (NRC's), and other events such as the NZ Under 14 Ocean Athlete Championships, the Pro Volleyball Tour and The Port of Tauranga Half Ironman triathlon.

== Artificial reef ==
New Zealand's first artificial reef was installed at the Mount. Construction of the reef was hampered by lack of funds and ironically, too many waves. Initially the public was told the reef would cost about $500k, but costs escalated to $800k. Media reported that local surfers are disappointed with the waves produced by the reef. The reef has also been blamed for creating rips and has now been removed.

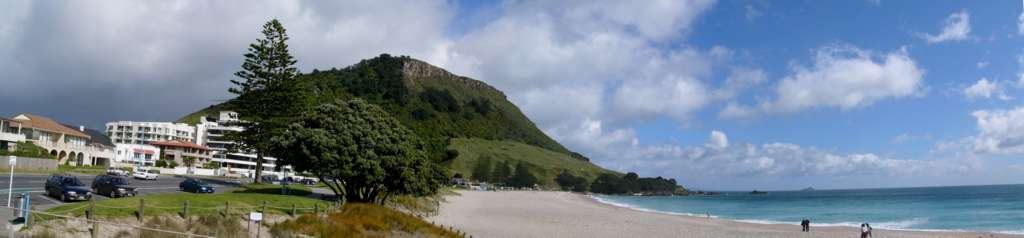
Panorama of Mount Maunganui and the Main Beach

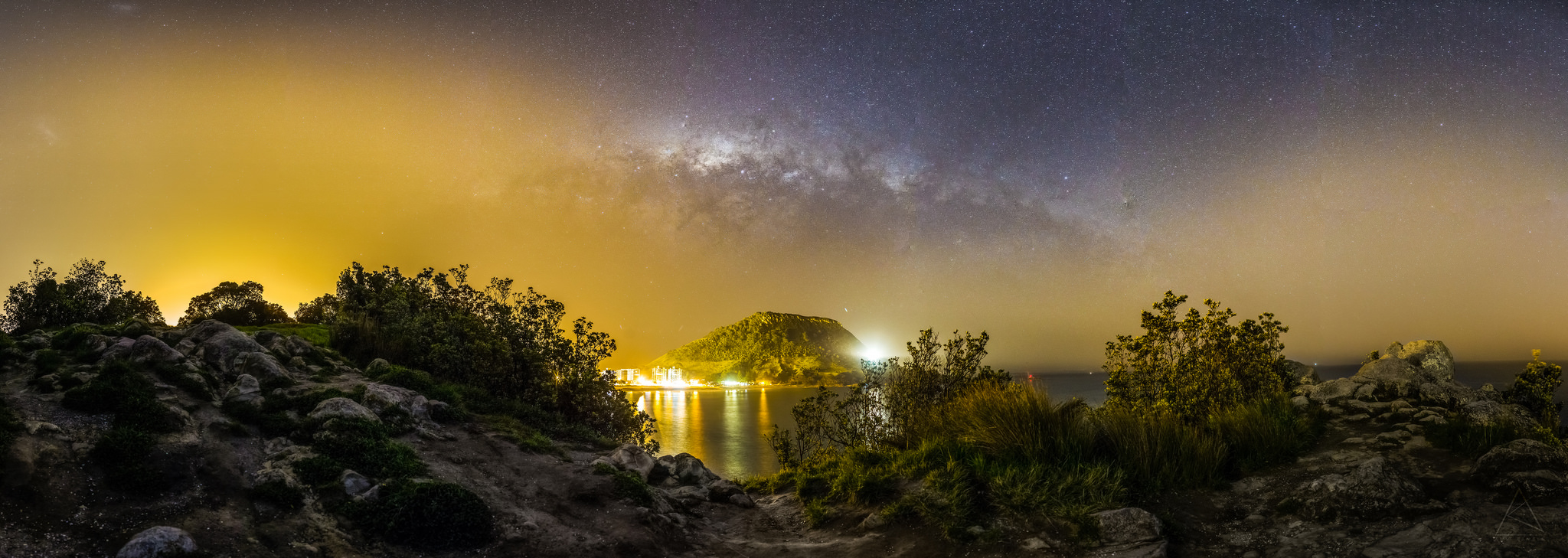
Panoramic view of Mount Maunganui from Moturiki Island at night, with the Milky Way in the background

== Climate ==
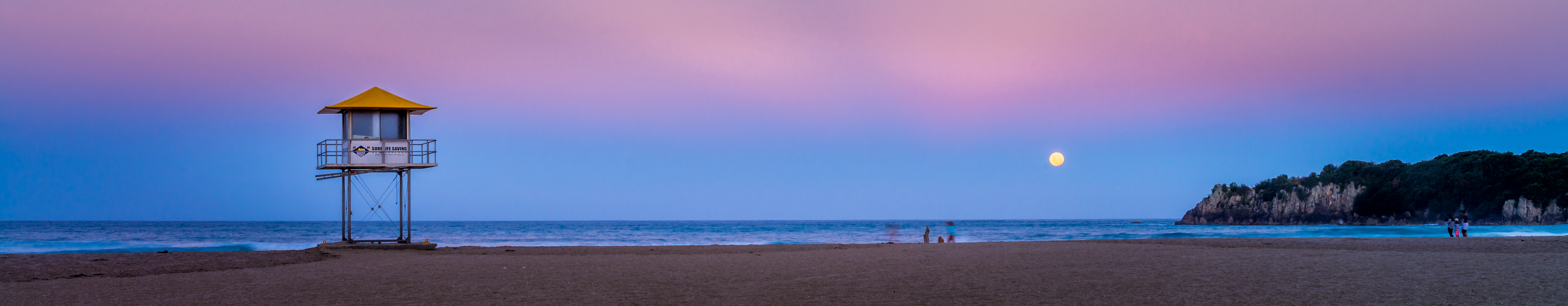
Mount Maunganui Main Beach, moon rise on 24 January 2016

The climate is mild subtropic:

- Summer = 20 °C / 30 °C (Jan/Feb)
- Winter = 10 °C / 15 °C (Jun/Jul)
- Frosts avg/yr = 12 (−1 °C −2 °C)
- Rainfall = 1280mm/yr avg
- Sunshine = min. 2200hrs/yr
- Beach temp. avg:
  - Summer = 21 °C
  - Winter = 14 °C

== Education ==
Mount Maunganui Primary School is a co-educational state primary school for Year 1 to 6 students, with a roll of 409 as of July 2026. The school opened in 1913. It moved to the current site in 1971.

Several schools are located in the suburbs of Omanu and Arataki, including Mount Maunganui College and Mount Maunganui Intermediate.

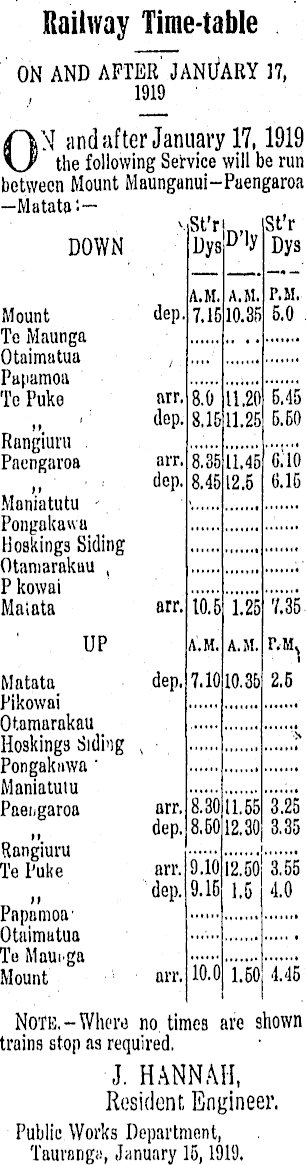
1919 timetable Mount-Matatā

== Mount Maunganui railway station ==
Mount Maunganui railway station was on the Mount Maunganui Branch of the East Coast Main Trunk (ECMT) from June 1913, which was then 4 mi 24 ch (6.9 km). It was initially planned to be a temporary station and lost its regular passenger service when Tauranga opened in 1924. It was just a railway formation by 1939, but since 1953 has become a main freight hub, including a locomotive maintenance depot.

=== History ===
On 12 April 1910 the Minister of Works, Thomas Mackenzie, turned the first sod of the Tauranga-Te Puke railway, near the site of the first railway station. It was planned that the Maunganui-Te Maunga branch would only be a temporary line, used by the Public Works Department (PWD) to carry supplies to build the rest of the ECMT.

The formal opening of the 13 mi (21 km) Maunganui-Te Puke section was on 16 October 1913, with an opening ceremony by the Mayor of Tauranga, close to where the first sod was cut. In 1913 the new Reform Party government allocated £2,000 to make a start on the approaches to the bridge to Tauranga. After protest a further £3,000 was added, making a total of £20,000 into 1914.

The branch was laid with 55lb rails. In 1910 2 platelayers' cottages were built, in 1911 2 in 1913 a drainage and a platelayers' cottages and 2 railway houses in 1928 and 8 in 1956.

By April 1911 a wharf was largely built, repaired in 1913 and 1914, when it was extended about 100 ft (30 m). By 1917 it was noted timber traffic was increasing and handling from punts was too costly, so a derrick crane was brought in, mounted on a U wagon. The yard was extended in 1922 and the wharf again in 1925. The wharf was used for timber in 1929, but by 1932 it was unsafe and being dismantled.

By mid 1912 a 2-stall engine shed, coal store and workshops for carpenters and blacksmiths had been built. In 1922 it was noted PWD maintains locomotives and rolling stock, constructs bridges, and carries out work for other parts of the country.

Buildings were noted in 1913, when there was a Post Office at the station; in 1921 the sorting shed was 80 ft (24 m) x 20 ft (6.1 m).

In 1924, when the line was extended to Tauranga, passenger trains stopped running to Maunganui and freight charges were increased. In 1926 it was proposed to close the branch, but a decision was delayed and, in 1929, it was decided excursions could run to Maunganui. By 1937 NZR the line was frequently used by excursions.

£775 was spent on the engine shed in 1933 and £100 on latrines, but part of the original station building was also moved to Te Maunga. The goods shed was largely used as a general material store, rather than as a goods shed.

Closure was again proposed in 1942 when the line was said to be overgrown with rubbish and, at the Airport Road crossing, buried under six inches of road metal. In May the branch was lifted, to use for a line to Kairanga Camp. However, "after extensive reconditioning" a private siding for the Air Department was opened to the recently built aerodrome on 4 September 1942.

In 1943 The Police Department considered using Maunganui station as lock-up cells.

==== Moturiki Island tramway ====
As an extension of the branch, there was about a mile of tramway from the station to the quarry on Moturiki Island, used until Te Puke quarry opened. The tramway was built in 1911, when its route was described as running from the station towards Ludwig's plantation, along Central Road, towards the Mount, turning off on the north side of Mt. Drury (Hopukiore) and passing between it and Mr Ward's cottage, to run straight to the island. Quarrying continued into the 1920s, but the rails had been taken up by 1926 and it was declared a reserve in 1937.

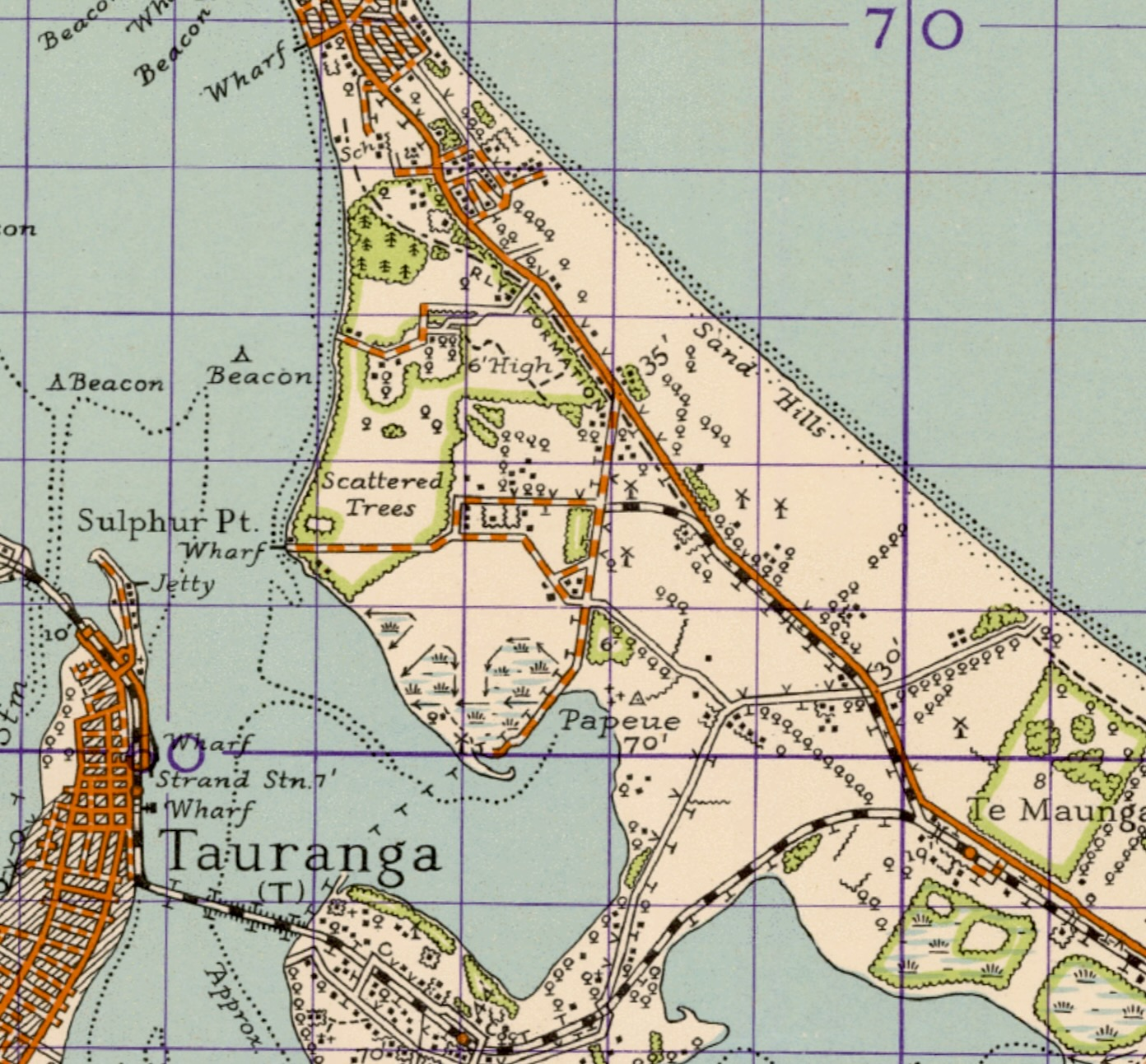
1943 map of Tauranga Harbour

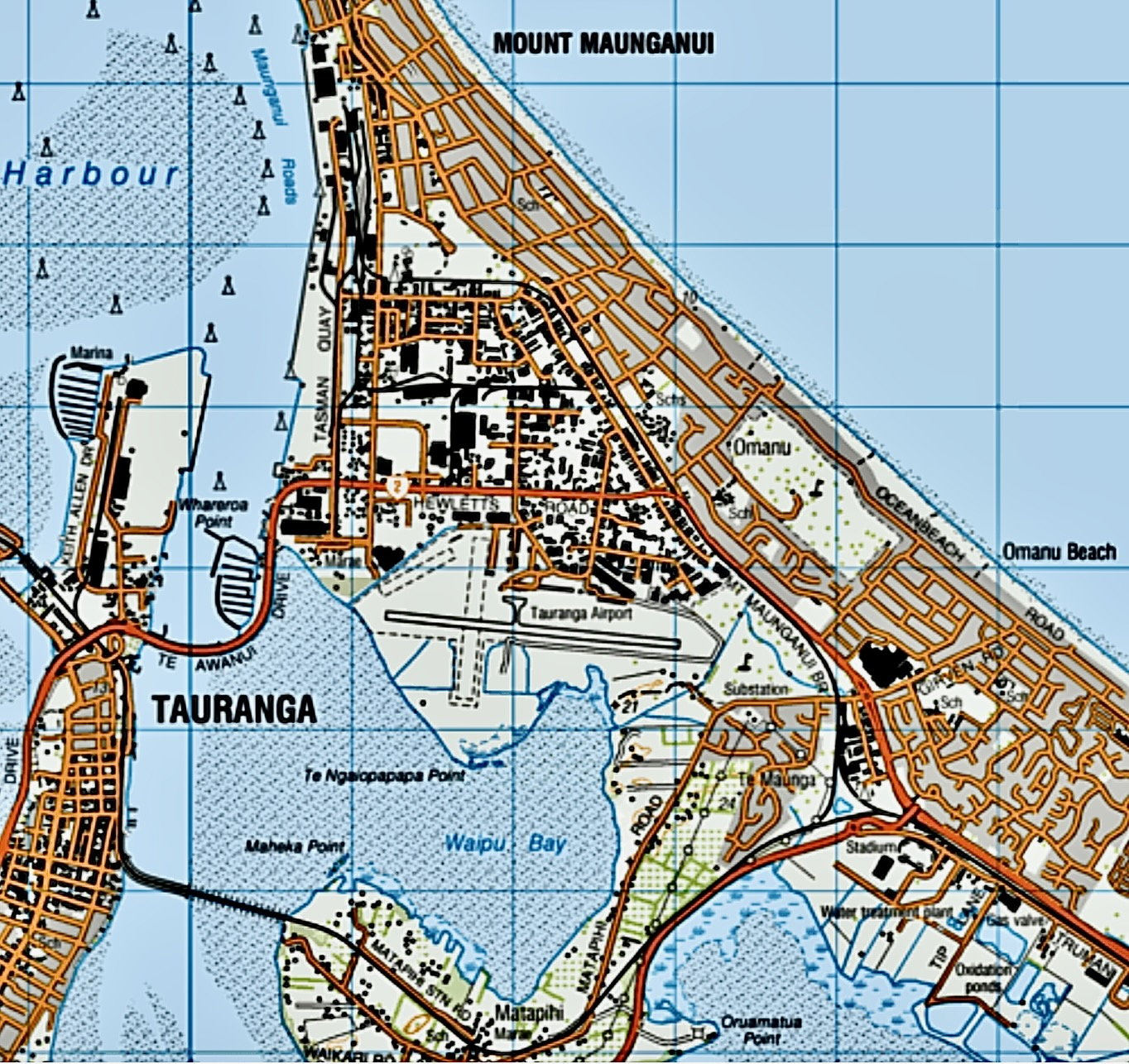
2018 map of Tauranga Harbour

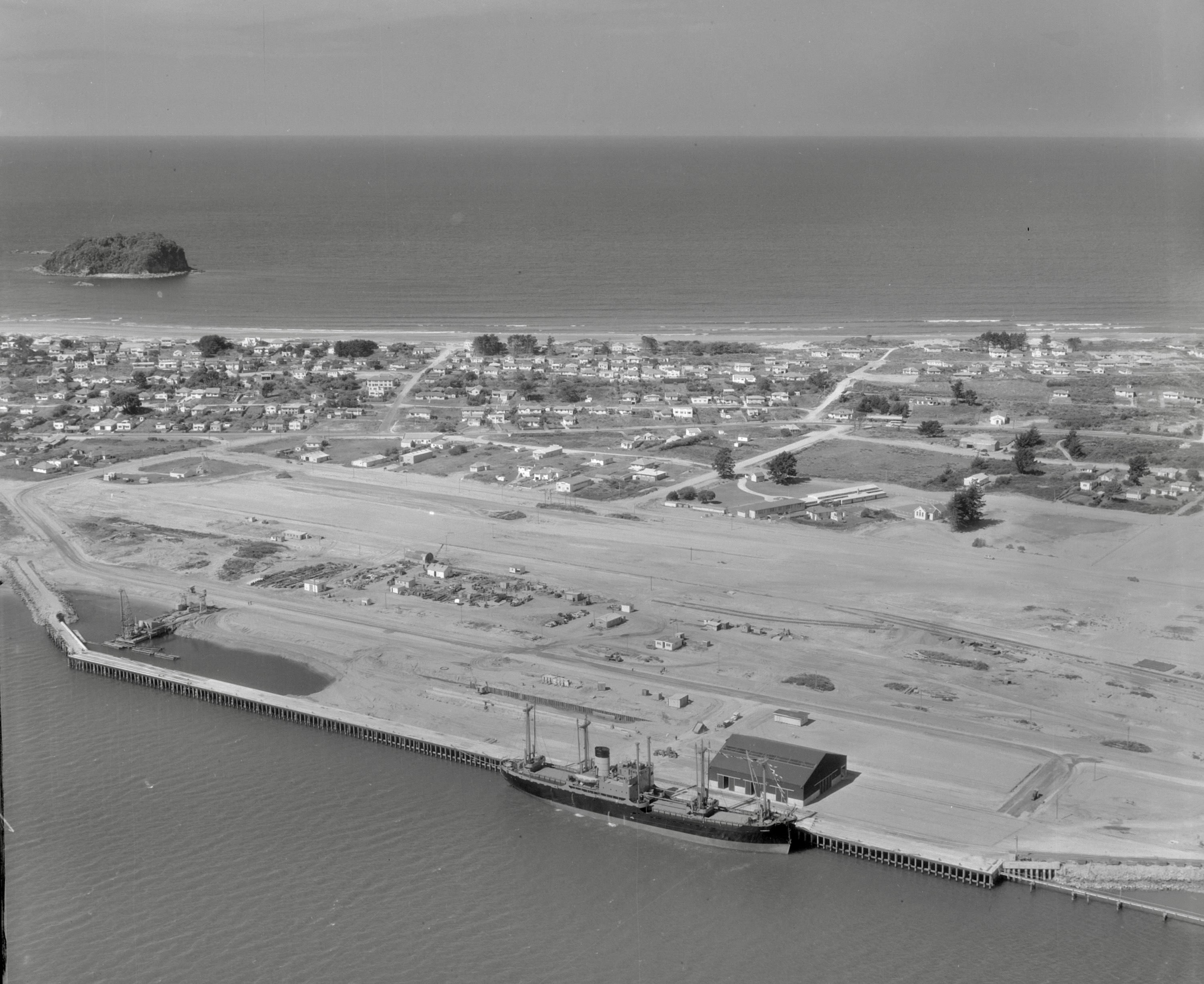
Mount Maunganui wharf in 1955

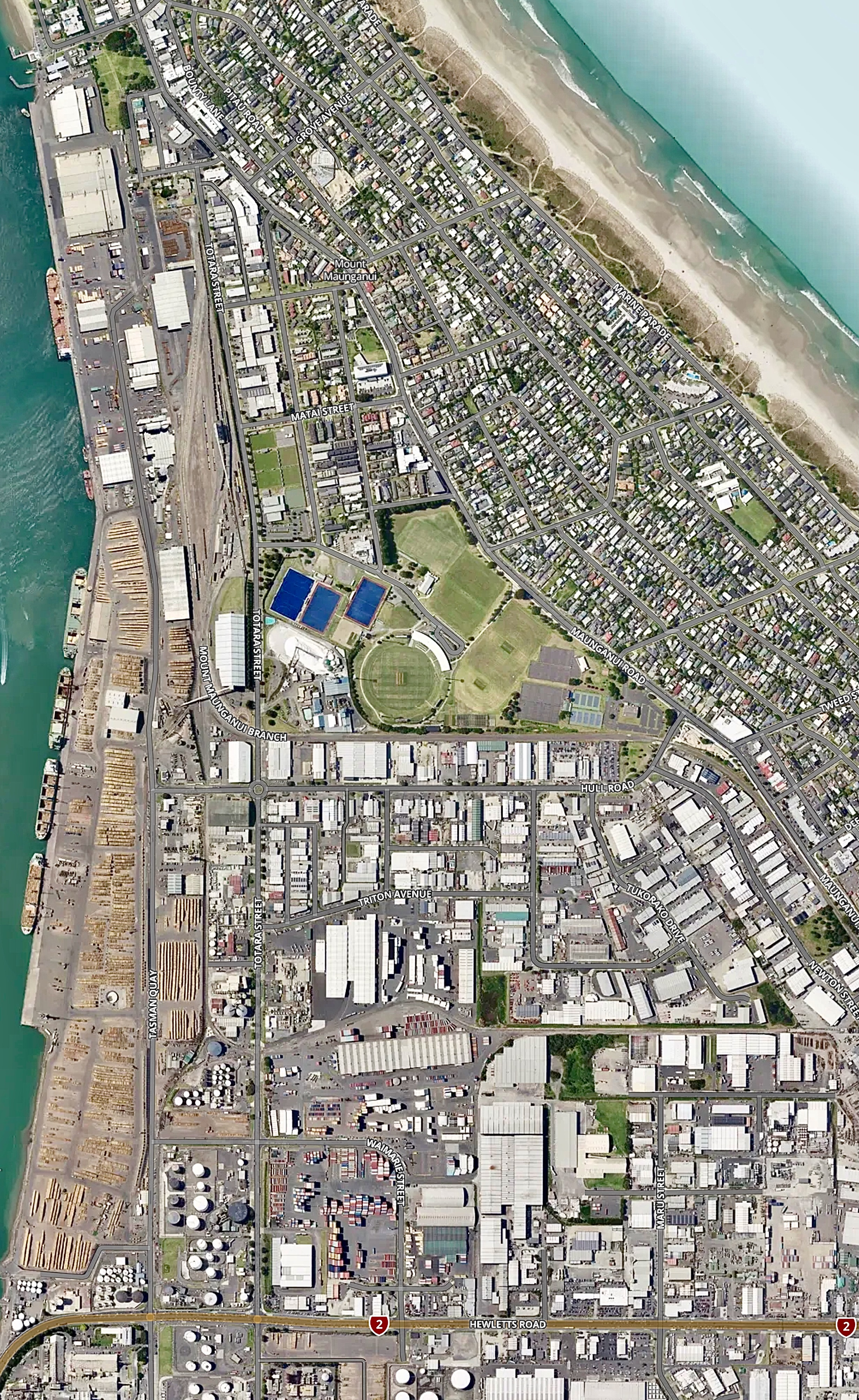
Mount Maunganui port in 2025

==== Post 1952 ====
In 1952 plans were made for a new wharf and rebuilding as a 6.5 km (4.0 mi) branch, which was done by late 1953. As the branch went through a pine plantation, steam locomotives were banned. In 1955 a 55 ft (17 m) turntable was moved from Taitā to Mount Maunganui. By 1988 it was a 21.3 m (70 ft) turntable. A goods shed, office, men's convenience, lamp room and store were also built. The branch reopened on 23 August 1955 and the new wharf on 3 December 1955. In 1964 it was extended by 700 ft (210 m). In October 1956 Mount Maunganui reopened as a station for goods and parcels, run by a stationmaster. It had 6 sidings near the wharf. PWD handed it over to New Zealand Railways in January 1958. In 1971 the yard was expanded from 277 to 980 wagons, with 100 points and 12 mi (19 km) of track in 26 sidings the line and yard was laid with 91lb rail, and the storage sidings with 70 to 75lb rails. A weighbridge was moved from Te Maunga to Mount Maunganui. It came into use in June 1972 and the 1953 yard became a service siding. The end of the branch is 104.55 km (64.96 mi) from the start of the ECMT at Hamilton

Preceding station	Historical railways	Following station
Terminus	East Coast Main Trunk; Mount Maunganui Branch; New Zealand Railways Department	Te Maunga; Line open, station goods 6.5 km (4.0 mi)

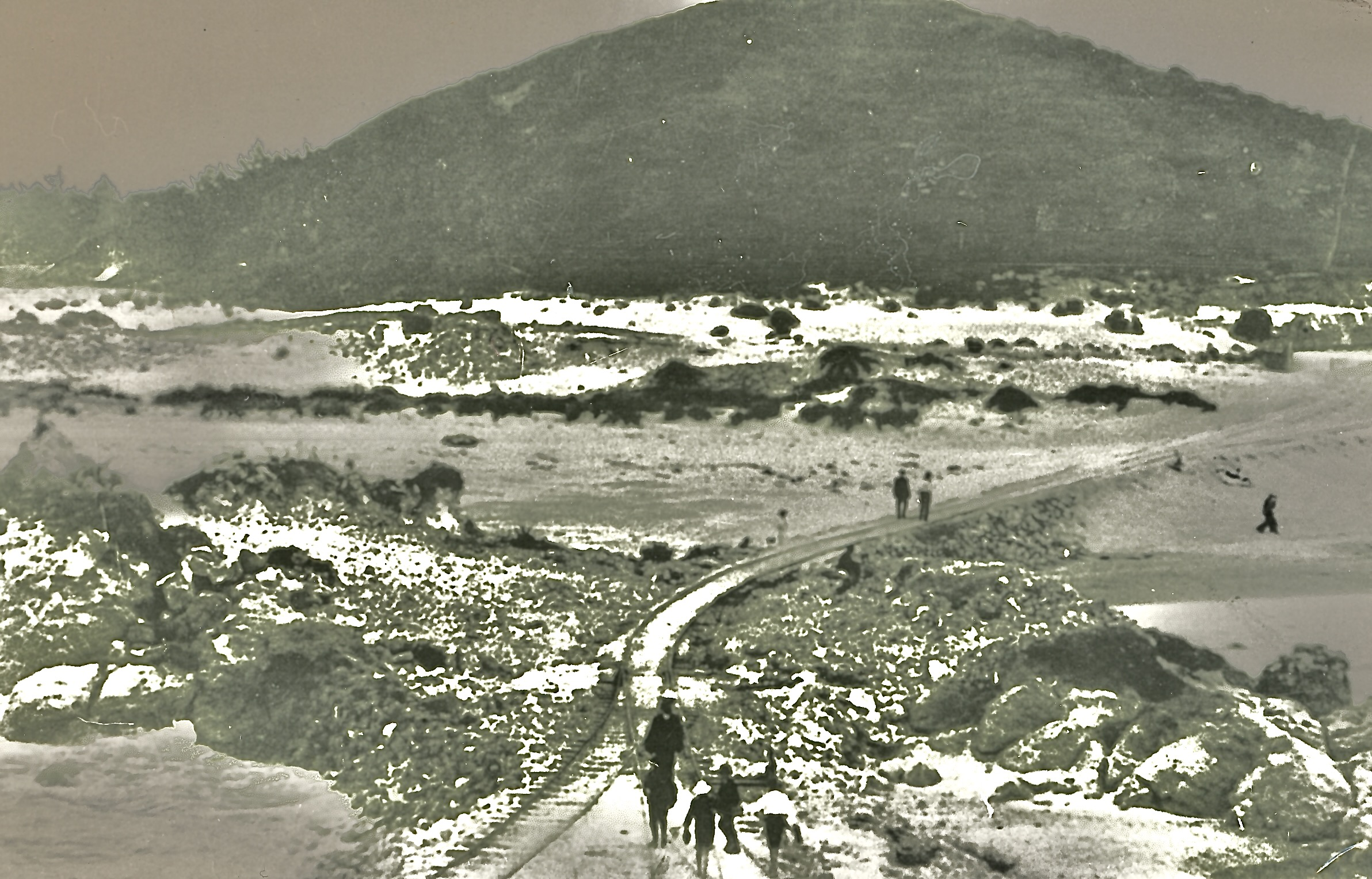
Moturiki railway across the beach

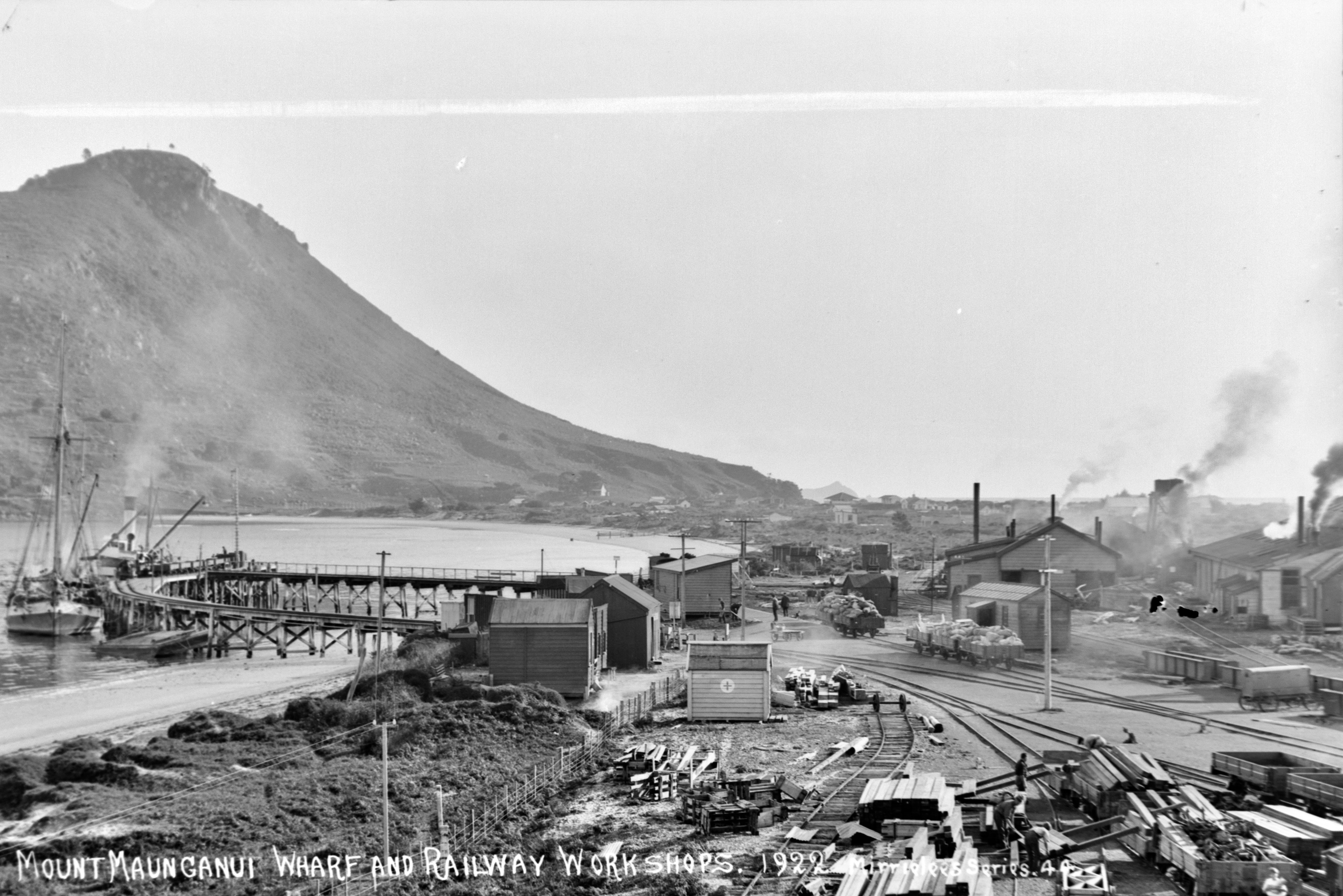
Railway station in 1922 (the shelter and platform in the centre)

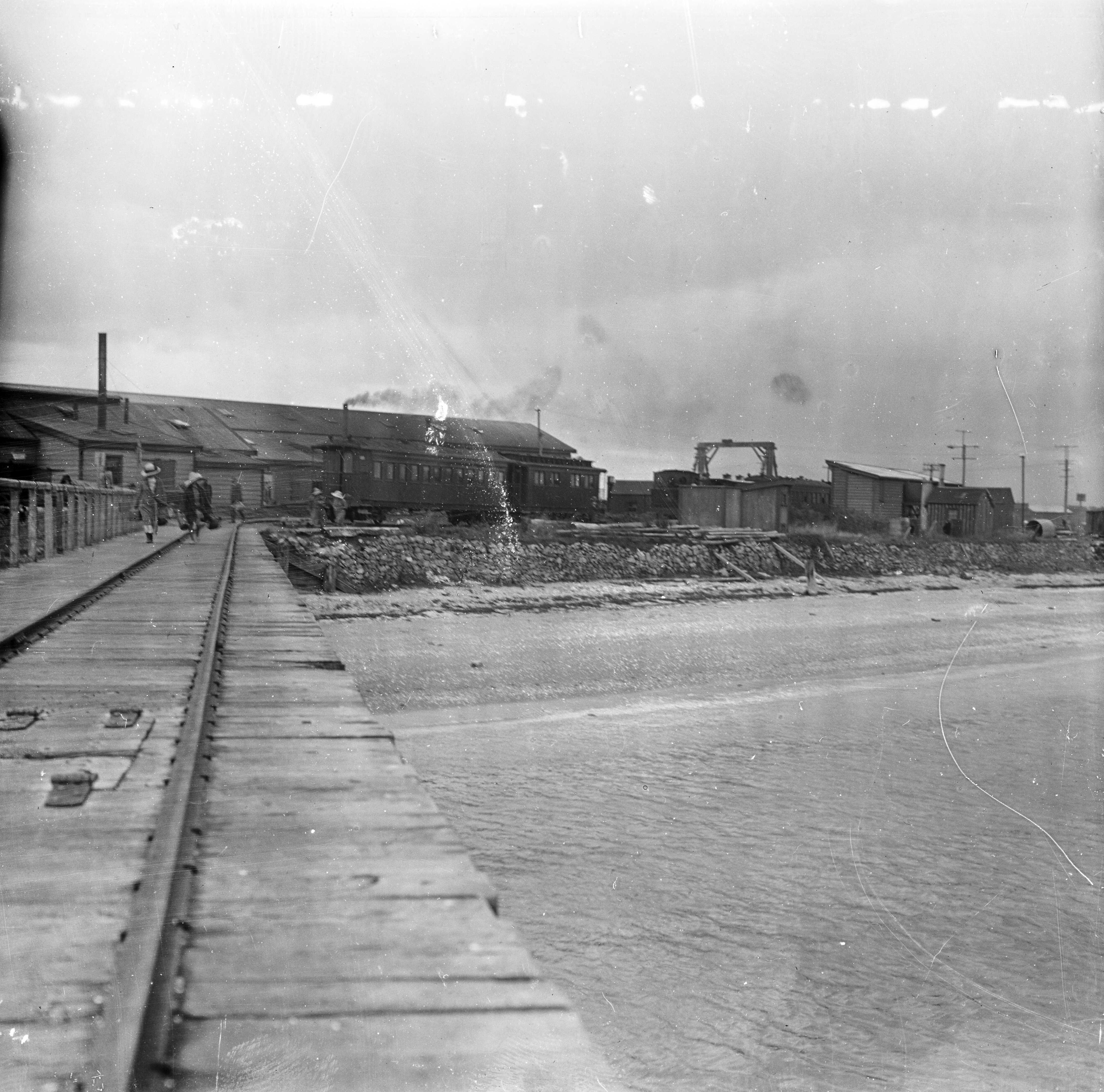
Passengers walking from train to ferry in 1924. The station is on the right

== Notable people ==
- James Ashcroft
- Simon Bridges
- Tom Furniss

== See also ==
- Mauao (Mount Maunganui)
