= List of New Zealand freight wagons =

This list contains all of the different railway freight wagons used in New Zealand, by the New Zealand Railways Department, New Zealand Railways Corporation, Tranz Rail, ONTRACK, Toll Rail and KiwiRail. Kiwirail has about 4,585 wagons.

== Classes L to M ==
Please note: to make this list easier to understand, all wagon classes are written as TMS classifications. An "?" indicates an unknown value.
Class	Type	Year	Number built
L	4 wheel highside wooden/steel	1890	9100+
LA	4 wheel highside steel	1902	13968
LB	4 wheel highside wooden	1907	2067
LB	4 wheel highside steel	1975	?
LBF	4 wheel highside fertiliser	?	250
LBG	4 wheel highside "Lake Grassmere"	1994	95
LBP	4 wheel highside paper add Easttown	1986	40
LBS	4 wheel highside scrap	1991	370
LC	4 wheel highside steel	1947	7064
LCW	4 wheel highside coal Westport	1988	39
LP	4 wheel highside newsprint	?	750
LPA	4 wheel highside paper	1972	601
LPF	4 wheel highside fertiliser	1995	101
LPL	4 wheel log 4 cradle	1998	60
LPM	4 wheel log 4 cradle	1989	25
LPS	4 wheel highside scrap	1989	50
LPX	4 wheel paper highspeed	1974	3
LW	4 wheel double highside woodchip	1979	35
LXC	4 wheel highside Penrose	1988	1
SH	4 wheel highside scrap haulage	1996	62
K	4 wheel box wooden	pre 1890	847
KC	4 wheel box wooden	1950	150
KP	4 wheel box steel	1960	2600
KS	4 wheel box steel	1967	1601
KSA	4 wheel box plug doors	1980	2
KSC	4 wheel box motor vehicle	1977	24
KSP	4 wheel box paper	1982	209
KST	4 wheel box curtainside	1984	202
KSX	4 wheel box highspeed	1976	2
M	4 wheel lowside	pre 1890	2000+
MC	4 wheel lowside	1941	389
MCC	4 wheel flat motor vehicle	1978	103
MCP	4 wheel flat tanks	1968	3

== Kiwirail wagons ==
This is Kiwirail's list of their wagons -

Class	Description	Maximum Loading Capacity (Tonnes)
C	Hopper Wagon - Coal	
CA	Hopper Wagon - Coal	
CB	Hopper Wagon - Coal	
CC	Hopper Wagon - Coal	
CE	Hopper Wagon - Coal	
CET	Hopper Wagon - Coal Covered	
CF	Hopper Wagon - Fertiliser Covered	
CG	Hopper Wagon - Grain Covered	
CW	Hopper Wagon - Coal	
CX	Hopper Wagon - Bulk/Grain Covered	
DD	Flat Deck Wagon - General Freight	
EA	Maintenance - Research Test Car	
FB	Log Wagon - Long Logs	
FC	Log Wagon - Short Logs	53
FE	Log Wagon - Short/Long Logs & Poles	41
FEG	Log Wagon - Short/Long Logs	41
FES	Log Wagon - Short Logs	40
FG	Log Wagon	41
FGS	Log Wagon	41
FM	Maintenance	
IP	Platform	
IZ	Container Wagon	
JF	Concertina Top Wagon - Coiled Steel	
JP	Concertina Top Wagon - General Freight	
JPC	Concertina Top Wagon - Coiled Steel	
JPK	Concertina Top Wagon - Steel Plates	
JPL	Concertina Top Wagon	
JPS	Concertina Top Wagon - Coiled Steel	
JPX	Concertina Top Wagon - Coiled Steel	
JT	Concertina Top Wagon - Newsprint	
LPA	Log Wagon - Short Logs	
LPF	Log Wagon - Short Logs	
LPL	Log Wagon - Short Logs	
LPM	Log Wagon - Short Logs	
LPS	Log Wagon - Short Logs	
MCW	Maintenance	
MDD	Maintenance - Flat Deck Wagon - Special Loads	
MUS	Maintenance - Flat Deck Wagon - Wheelsets & Bogies	
MWB	Maintenance - Flat Deck Wagon - Wheelsets	
NZS	Maintenance - Flat Deck Wagon - NZ Steel Coil & Billets	
OM	Container Wagon - Milk	
SH	Log Wagon - Short Logs	
TRK	Dummy Truck	
UC	Tank Wagon - Liquids	
UCA	Tank Wagon - Liquids	
UCG	Tank Wagon - LPG	
UCT	Tank Wagon - Resin	
UKL	Log Wagon - Cradles	36
UKN	Log Wagon - Cradles	33
ULA	Log Wagon - Logs & Poles	38
ULB	Log Wagon - Logs & Poles	38
ULD	Log Wagon - Logs & Poles	
ULE	Log Wagon - Logs & Poles	38
US	Flat Deck Wagon - General Freight	
USB	Flat Deck Wagon - Steel Coil & Billet	
USL	Log Wagon - Logs & Poles	38
VRA	Insulated Swap Body Wagon - refrigerated	
VRB	Insulated Swap Body Wagon - refrigerated	
XPC	Private	
XPT	Private	
YC	Maintenance	
YD	Maintenance - Side Dump Wagon - Rock Clay Ballast	
YF	Maintenance - Conveyor Wagon - Ballast & Soil	
YH	Maintenance	
YJ	Maintenance - Ballast Wagon	
YK	Maintenance	
YKR	Maintenance - Ballast Support Wagon	
YL	Maintenance	
ZA	Box Wagon - Forestry & General Freight	
ZAF	Box Wagon - Open Side - Forestry	
ZBP	Box Wagon - Curtainside - Pulp Products	
ZC	Box Wagon - Curtainside - General Freight	
ZD	Box Wagon - Curtainside - General Freight	
ZG	Box Wagon - Plug Door - General Freight	
ZH	Box Wagon - Plug Door - General Freight	
ZHC	Box Wagon - Curtainside - General Freight	38
ZHD	Box Wagon - Curtainside - General Freight	
ZHS	Box Wagon - Plug Door - General Freight	
ZK	Box Wagon - Curtainside - Pulp & Paper	41
ZL	Box Wagon - All Door - Newsprint Rolls	
ZM	Box Wagon - All Door - Newsprint & Paper Products	
ZWF	Box Wagon - GWF Container on IA Wagon	47.7
ZWT	Box Wagon - 2x25ft long GWT Containers on IA Wagon	2 x 23.8
ZWX	Box Wagon - 50ft Wide Body Container - Pulp	47.7
ZXC	Box Wagon - 2 x TSMs	
ZXF	Box Wagon - Curtainside - General Freight	35
ZXM	Box Wagon - Curtainside - General Freight	
ZXT	Box Wagon - Curtainside - General Freight	
ZXX	Box Wagon - Curtainside - General Freight	
ZXY	Box Wagon - Curtainside - General Freight	

=== Container wagons ===
1HD	10ft HC ISO Dry	
1SD	10ft Std ISO Dry	
2FD	20ft Flat Rack ISO	
2HD	20ft HC ISO Dry	
2HR	20ft HC ISO refrigerated	
2LD	25ft Std Dry	
2LR	25ft HC refrigerated Thermal	
2SD	20ft Std ISO Dry	
2SL	20ft Std Long Dry	
2SR	20ft Std ISO refrigerated	
2TG	20ft Tank Gas	
4FD	40ft Flat Rack ISO	
4HD	40ft HC ISO Dry	
4HR	40ft HC ISO refrigerated	
4LR	43ft HC refrigerated	
4SD	40ft Std ISO Dry	
4SR	40ft Std ISO refrigerated	
BSM	25FT HC SIDE OPENER - KR	
EC	20ft Service Box	
ERC	20ft Flat Rack Service	
ERR	20ft Rotable Recover	
EXL	20ft Service Tank	
GAT	20ft HC - Toll	
GBC	20ft Std Side Opener - KR/Toll	
GBD	10ft Std Grain - Toll	
GBW	10ft Std Side Opener Bulk Head KR	
GBY	20ft Std Side Opener - KR	
GCM	25ft HC Curtain Sider - KR	20
GCT	25ft HC Curtain Sider - KR	20
GEC	20ft Std End Opener - Toll	
GFC	20ft Half Height - Toll	
GFF	20ft Std End Opener - KR	
GGC	20ft HC Grain	
GOA	10ft Flat Rack - KR	
GOC	20ft Flat Rack - Toll	
GOH	10ft Domestic Steel Coil - KR	
GOL	10ft Cradle on IP Wagons	
GOP	10ft Coiled Steel Rod - KR	
GOR	10ft Cradle on IP Wagons	
GOS	10ft Domestic Steel Coil - KR	
GOW	20ft Wool Flat Rack	
GSB	40ft HC Curtain Sider - Toll	
GSC	20ft Std Side Opener - Toll	
GSD	10ft General Purpose	
GSM	25ft HC Side Opener - KR	
GSS	10ft Std Side Opener - KR	
GST	25ft General Purpose	
GSW	10ft Std Side Opener - Toll	
GSX	20ft Std Side Opener - KR/Toll	
GSY	20ft Std Side Opener - KR/Toll	
GTX	20ft General Purpose	
GVW	10ft Std Side Opener - Toll	
GVX	20ft Std Side Opener Ventilated - Toll	
GXT	25ft HC Curtain Sider - KR	20
HAC	20ft Hopper Container	
HBD	10ft Std Coal Hopper - KR	
HCC	20ft Std Coal - KR	
HCD	10ft Std Coal - KR	
HCS	20ft Scrap Steel Only	
HEC	20ft Std Urea - KR	
HED	10ft Std Grain - Toll	
HFC	20ft Std Wood Chip - KR	
HGC	20ft Std Grain - Toll	
HGX	20ft Std Grain - Toll	
HLC	20ft Std Coal - KR	
HLD	20ft Std Coal - KR	
HLS	20ft Std Scrapr - Toll	
HMC	20ft Std Dry - Toll	
HMD	10ft Std Dry - Toll	
HSW	10ft Std Grain - Toll	
HUG	20ft Std Grain & Pallets - Toll	
HWT	25ft Std Dry wood Chip - KR	
LFC	20ft Tank Water - KR	
LFF	10ft Tank Wine - Toll	
LGD	10ft Tank - Toll	
LGF	10ft Tank - Toll	
LSC	20ft Tank Insulated - Toll	
LSG	20ft Tank Insulated - Toll	
LSK	20ft Lease Milk Tank	
LSM	40ft Tank Stainless Steel - KR	
LSO	20ft Loco Lube Oil	
LST	20ft General Purpose	
LSX	20ft Milk Tank	
LTD	20ft Bulk Tallow	
LTF	20ft Std - Log Cradle	19.5
LWD	10ft Tank Stainless Steel - Toll	
LXG	20ft Tank Heavy Insulated - Toll	
LXM	20ft Tank Insulated Stainless Steel	
LXP	20ft Tank Insulated - Toll	
LXR	20ft Tank Heavy Insulated - Toll	
LXW	20ft Tank Insulated - Toll	
LYC	20ft Tank Stainless Steel - Toll Container	
MAL	10ft Maintenance Parts	
MRB	20ft Mech Rollo Beam	
MSM	20ft General Purpose	
MSX	20ft Std Side Opener - KR	
MWC	20ft Mechanical Wheel	
NZC	20ft HC Coloursteel Coile	
PFC	20ft Std Flour - KR	
PFD	10ft Std Flour - Toll	
PFX	10ft Std Flour - KR	
PGD	10ft Std Powder - Toll	
PLC	20ft Bulk Lime	
TBB	20ft Insulated Container	
TBC	20ft Insulated Container	
TBG	20ft General Box	
TBH	20ft Thermal Box Pelts Container	
TBK	20ft Insulated Container	
TBL	20ft Open Top Offal Container	
TCC	20ft Insulated Container	
TFF	20ft Clothing Container	
TFR	20ft Flat Rack	
TRA	43ft HC refrigerated	
TRB	48ft HC refrigerated	
TRC	50ft HC refrigerated	
TSD	25ft HC Curtain Sider - KR	26.3
TSF	25ft HC Container	26.3
TSH	25FT HC refrigerated THERMAL SWAP BODY - KR	26.3
TSL	25ft HC Curtain Sider Insulated - KR	26.3
TSM	25ft HC Curtain Sider - KR/Toll	26.3
TSR	25ft HC refrigerated thermal Swap Body - KR	
TST	20ft General Purpose	
TSX	20ft Std Side Opener Insulated - KR	
TVG	20ft Insulated Container	
VCX	20ft Scrap Box	
XBC	20ft Std End Opener Grain - Toll	
XGC	20ft Std End Opener Grain - Toll	
XOP	10ft Std Steel Rod Rack	

=== Generators ===
GEN	Genset 10' Base
GEP	Genset 10' Base
GET	Genset 10' Base
GEX	Genset <8'6"
GSR	Containerised Genset
POT	GENSET 10' BASE
RGS	Generator Set
WEB	Genset 10' Base
