= Koutu =

Suburb of Rotorua, New Zealand

- Suburb
- Interactive map of Koutu
- Coordinates: 38.119843°S 176.238450°E
- Country: New Zealand
- City: Rotorua
- Local authority: Rotorua Lakes Council
- Electoral ward: Te Ipu Wai Auraki General Ward

Area
  - Land: 96 ha (240 acres)

Population (June 2025)
  - Total: 2,340
  - Density: 2,400/km^{2} (6,300/sq mi)

Fairy Springs	Kawaha Point
Western Heights	Koutu	(Lake Rotorua)
Mangakakahi	Ohinemutu	Rotorua Central

Koutu is a suburb of Rotorua in the Bay of Plenty Region of New Zealand's North Island. Koutu was originally a home for the people of Ngati Whakaue and Ngāti Uenukukopako and has been in existence since before the establishment of Rotorua Township.

It is located on the southwest shore of Lake Rotorua.

A new development of 58 houses, with 28 subsidised for rent, is expected to have tenants by the end of 2025.

== Marae ==
The suburb has one marae:

- Koutu or Karenga Marae and Tumahaurangi meeting house is a meeting place of the Ngāti Whakaue hapū of Ngāti Karenga.

== Transport ==
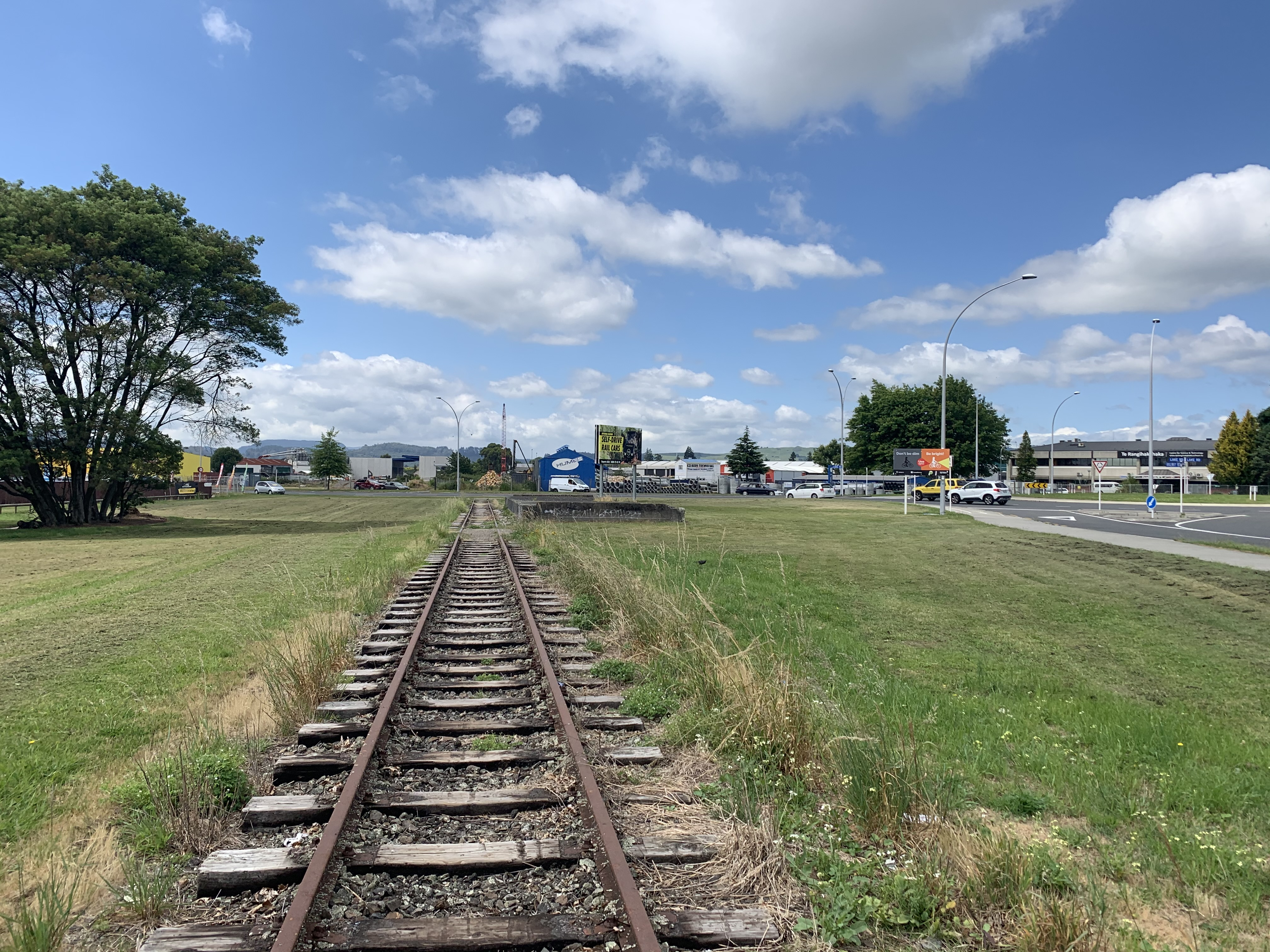
The derelict site of Koutu railway station in December 2019, looking south across Lake Road.

Koutu sits on State Highway 5.

Koutu received a railway in 1894 when the Rotorua Branch line opened. It operated for over a century. In 1989, the last 2.4 km into central Rotorua closed, and a goods yard near industries in Koutu became the end of the line. Passenger trains from Auckland had ceased operating in 1968, but, ironically, a new service began two years after the railway was cut back to Koutu. Called the Geyserland Express, it first operated on 9 December 1991 and terminated at a small platform north of Lake Road; the goods yard was on the southern side of Lake Road. Passengers complained about the station being in an industrial area away from the centre of Rotorua, but proposals to rebuild the line to a more central terminus never came to fruition. Goods trains ceased in 2000 and Tranz Rail cancelled the Geyserland Express in October 2001 after it failed to find a new operator to buy the service. The railway has been mothballed ever since; the tracks to Koutu remain in place but disused, while a passenger shelter on the platform has been removed.

== Demographics ==
Koutu covers 0.96 km^{2} (0.37 sq mi) and had an estimated population of 2,340 as of June 2025, with a population density of 2,438 people per km^{2}.

Historical population
Year	Pop.	±% p.a.
2006	1,848	—
2013	1,830	−0.14%
2018	2,094	+2.73%
2023	2,184	+0.85%

Koutu had a population of 2,184 in the 2023 New Zealand census, an increase of 90 people (4.3%) since the 2018 census, and an increase of 354 people (19.3%) since the 2013 census. There were 1,068 males, 1,113 females, and 3 people of other genders in 696 dwellings. 2.6% of people identified as LGBTIQ+. The median age was 31.9 years (compared with 38.1 years nationally). There were 522 people (23.9%) aged under 15 years, 498 (22.8%) aged 15 to 29, 915 (41.9%) aged 30 to 64, and 246 (11.3%) aged 65 or older.

People could identify as more than one ethnicity. The results were 41.2% European (Pākehā); 72.8% Māori; 8.9% Pasifika; 7.3% Asian; 0.4% Middle Eastern, Latin American and African New Zealanders (MELAA); and 1.4% other, which includes people giving their ethnicity as "New Zealander". English was spoken by 95.6%, Māori by 25.7%, Samoan by 0.7%, and other languages by 7.0%. No language could be spoken by 2.5% (e.g. too young to talk). New Zealand Sign Language was known by 0.5%. The percentage of people born overseas was 11.7, compared with 28.8% nationally.

Religious affiliations were 32.3% Christian, 0.7% Hindu, 0.3% Islam, 5.6% Māori religious beliefs, 0.5% Buddhist, 0.5% New Age, and 1.6% other religions. People who answered that they had no religion were 50.7%, and 8.5% of people did not answer the census question.

Of those at least 15 years old, 243 (14.6%) people had a bachelor's or higher degree, 939 (56.5%) had a post-high school certificate or diploma, and 483 (29.1%) people exclusively held high school qualifications. The median income was $33,100, compared with $41,500 nationally. 60 people (3.6%) earned over $100,000 compared to 12.1% nationally. The employment status of those at least 15 was 768 (46.2%) full-time, 213 (12.8%) part-time, and 123 (7.4%) unemployed.
