= Fairy Springs =

Suburb of Rotorua, New Zealand

- Suburb
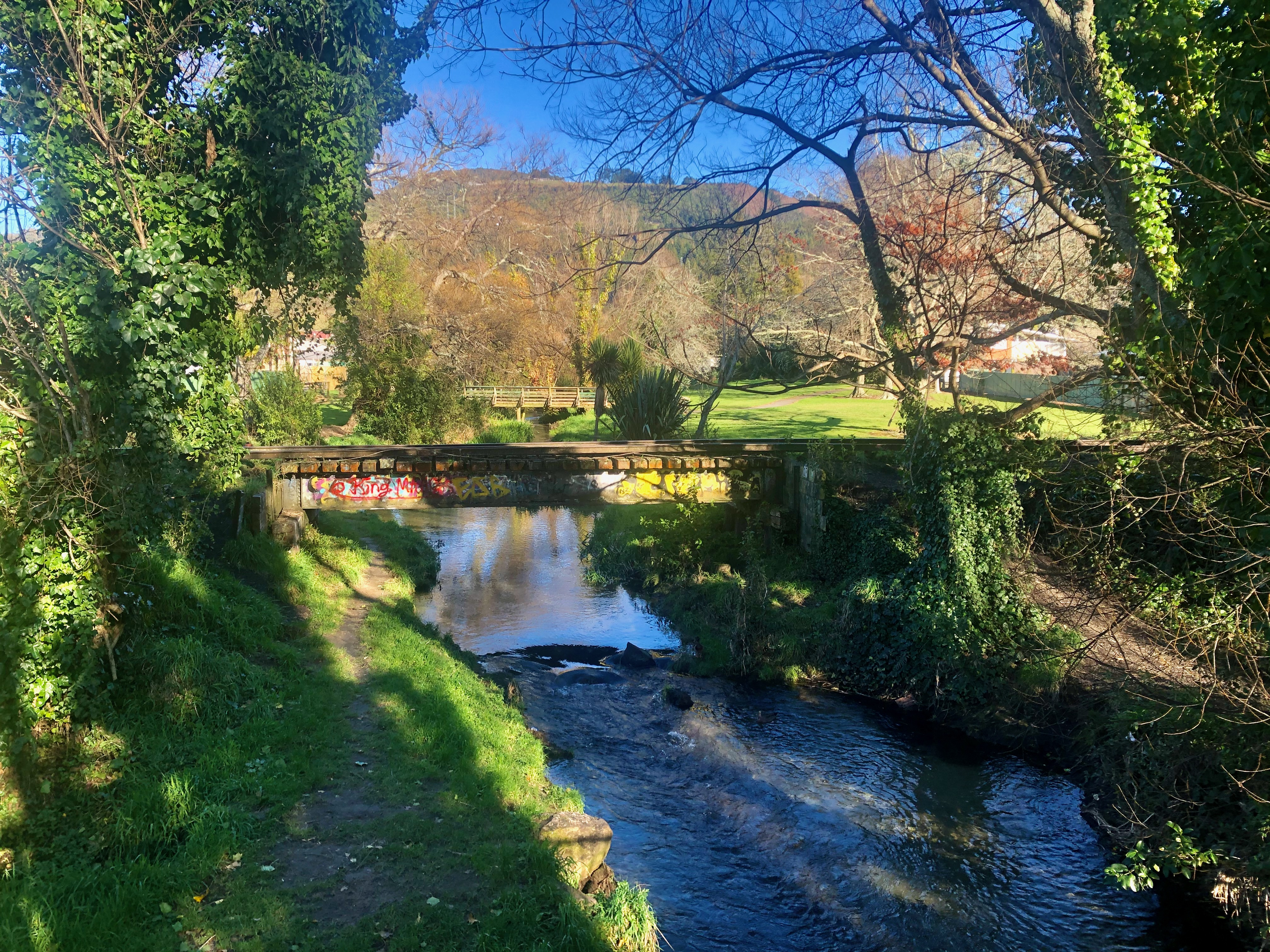
- Railway bridge over Waiowhiro Stream
- Interactive map of Fairy Springs
- Coordinates: 38.118264°S 176.227688°E
- Country: New Zealand
- City: Rotorua
- Local authority: Rotorua Lakes Council
- Electoral ward: Te Ipu Wai Auraki General Ward

Area
  - Land: 74 ha (180 acres)

Population (June 2025)
  - Total: 1,890
  - Density: 2,600/km^{2} (6,600/sq mi)

Ngongotahā	Ngongotahā	Kawaha Point
Selwyn Heights	Fairy Springs	Koutu
Western Heights	Mangakakahi	Ohinemutu

Fairy Springs is a suburb of Rotorua in the Bay of Plenty Region of New Zealand's North Island. It is located south of Ngongotahā, west of Koutu, east of Selwyn Heights, and north of Mangakakahi.

A major arterial road, Fairy Springs Road, runs through the centre of the suburb. The busy road has been used for political protests. Motorists continued to use the road during severe flooding in April 2018.

Rainbow Springs Nature Park on Fairy Springs Road closed in 2022. The land was bought by a collective of Ngāti Whakaue, which developed it as Rotorua Heritage Farm and 3D Trick Art Gallery. In 2025, a retirement village was approved for the site.

== Demographics ==
Fairy Springs covers 0.74 km^{2} (0.29 sq mi) and had an estimated population of 1,890 as of June 2025, with a population density of 2,554 people per km^{2}.

Historical population
Year	Pop.	±% p.a.
2006	1,626	—
2013	1,572	−0.48%
2018	1,782	+2.54%
2023	1,791	+0.10%

Fairy Springs had a population of 1,791 in the 2023 New Zealand census, an increase of 9 people (0.5%) since the 2018 census, and an increase of 219 people (13.9%) since the 2013 census. There were 870 males, 915 females, and 3 people of other genders in 624 dwellings. 3.4% of people identified as LGBTIQ+. The median age was 33.8 years (compared with 38.1 years nationally). There were 402 people (22.4%) aged under 15 years, 390 (21.8%) aged 15 to 29, 756 (42.2%) aged 30 to 64, and 240 (13.4%) aged 65 or older.

People could identify as more than one ethnicity. The results were 54.8% European (Pākehā); 53.4% Māori; 7.4% Pasifika; 12.1% Asian; 0.7% Middle Eastern, Latin American and African New Zealanders (MELAA); and 2.3% other, which includes people giving their ethnicity as "New Zealander". English was spoken by 95.6%, Māori by 16.9%, Samoan by 0.3%, and other languages by 8.7%. No language could be spoken by 2.2% (e.g. too young to talk). New Zealand Sign Language was known by 0.5%. The percentage of people born overseas was 15.9, compared with 28.8% nationally.

Religious affiliations were 29.3% Christian, 1.5% Hindu, 0.7% Islam, 4.7% Māori religious beliefs, 0.8% Buddhist, 0.3% New Age, and 1.7% other religions. People who answered that they had no religion were 55.6%, and 5.9% of people did not answer the census question.

Of those at least 15 years old, 213 (15.3%) people had a bachelor's or higher degree, 801 (57.7%) had a post-high school certificate or diploma, and 366 (26.3%) people exclusively held high school qualifications. The median income was $39,000, compared with $41,500 nationally. 63 people (4.5%) earned over $100,000 compared to 12.1% nationally. The employment status of those at least 15 was 738 (53.1%) full-time, 177 (12.7%) part-time, and 63 (4.5%) unemployed.
