= Kawaha Point =

Suburb of Rotorua, New Zealand

- Suburb
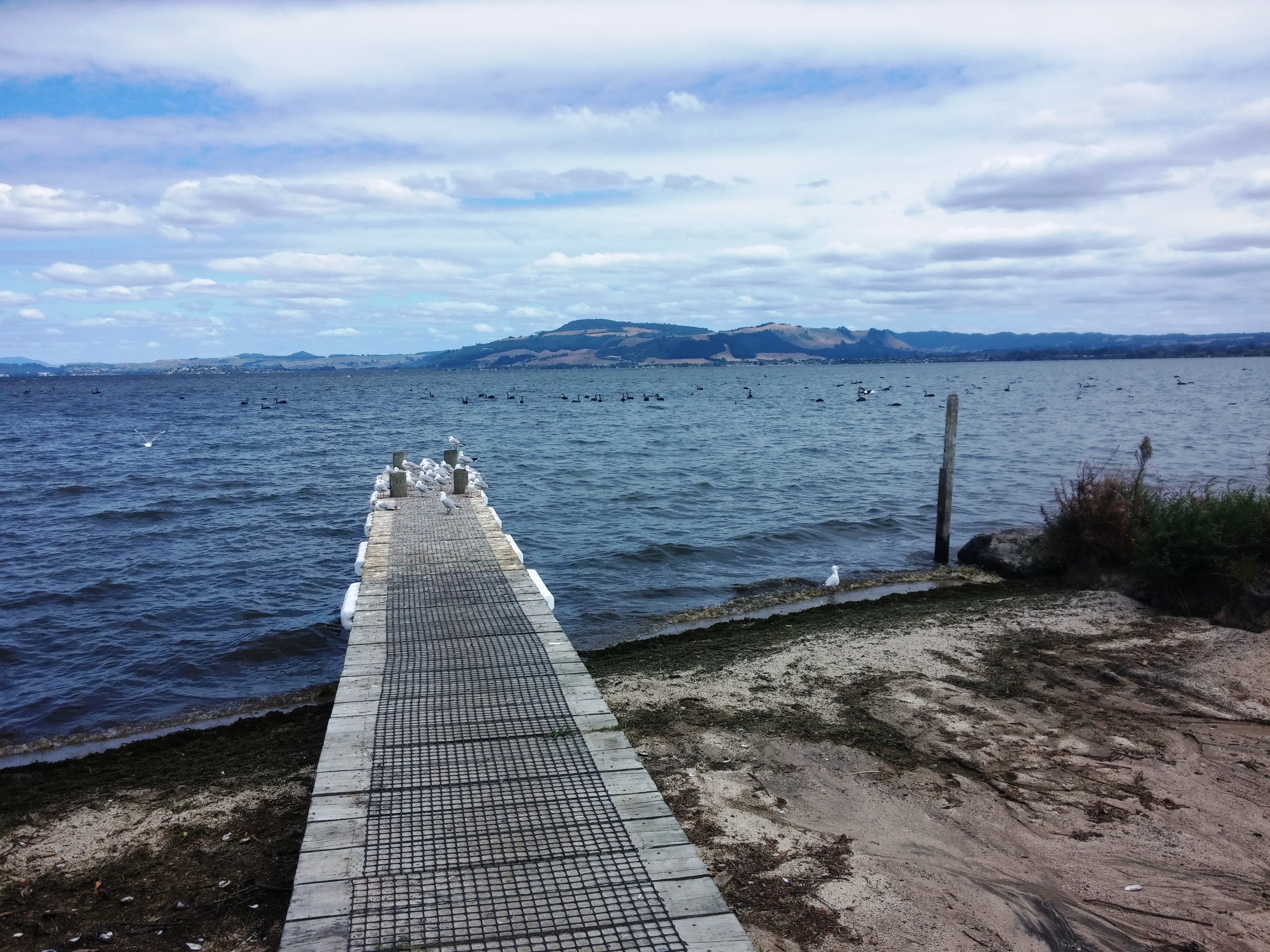
- A small jetty at the edge of Lake Rotorua
- Interactive map of Kawaha Point
- Coordinates: 38.111349°S 176.236947°E
- Country: New Zealand
- City: Rotorua
- Local authority: Rotorua Lakes Council
- Electoral ward: Te Ipu Wai Auraki General Ward

Area
  - Land: 103 ha (250 acres)

Population (June 2025)
  - Total: 1,980
  - Density: 1,920/km^{2} (4,980/sq mi)

Ngongotahā		(Lake Rotorua)
Fairy Springs	Kawaha Point
Selwyn Heights	Koutu

Kawaha Point is a suburb of Rotorua in the Bay of Plenty Region of New Zealand's North Island.

== History ==
In 1910 the area was used for growing potatoes. In 1917 a son of businessman and politician, Robert Gillies, Arthur William Gillies, started the development of Kawaha Point, when he offered an area for a hospital, on condition that the government improve the road. A loan to improve the road was approved in 1924. Land was sold in 1927 and more in 1929. Initially development was only on the south side of the point. The area to the north was built between about 1966 and 2000.

In 2023, Kāinga Ora proposed the replacement of six state houses on Kawaha Point Road with 16 modern houses of between two and five bedrooms. Later the same year, Rotorua Lakes Council voted to develop council-owned land on Kawaha Point Road, creating about 30 sections, with more sections being likely on an adjoining rugby field.

== Demographics ==
Kawaha statistical area, which corresponds to this suburb, covers 1.03 km^{2} (0.40 sq mi) and had an estimated population of 1,980 as of June 2025, with a population density of 1,922 people per km^{2}.

Historical population
Year	Pop.	±% p.a.
2006	1,641	—
2013	1,773	+1.11%
2018	1,902	+1.41%
2023	1,905	+0.03%

Kawaha had a population of 1,905 in the 2023 New Zealand census, an increase of 3 people (0.2%) since the 2018 census, and an increase of 132 people (7.4%) since the 2013 census. There were 915 males, 987 females, and 6 people of other genders in 684 dwellings. 3.3% of people identified as LGBTIQ+. The median age was 39.6 years (compared with 38.1 years nationally). There were 378 people (19.8%) aged under 15 years, 357 (18.7%) aged 15 to 29, 843 (44.3%) aged 30 to 64, and 330 (17.3%) aged 65 or older.

People could identify as more than one ethnicity. The results were 62.4% European (Pākehā); 40.8% Māori; 7.4% Pasifika; 10.7% Asian; 1.3% Middle Eastern, Latin American and African New Zealanders (MELAA); and 1.9% other, which includes people giving their ethnicity as "New Zealander". English was spoken by 95.6%, Māori by 14.3%, Samoan by 0.3%, and other languages by 13.4%. No language could be spoken by 1.7% (e.g. too young to talk). New Zealand Sign Language was known by 0.6%. The percentage of people born overseas was 20.5, compared with 28.8% nationally.

Religious affiliations were 32.9% Christian, 1.7% Hindu, 0.2% Islam, 2.7% Māori religious beliefs, 1.1% Buddhist, 0.5% New Age, and 1.1% other religions. People who answered that they had no religion were 52.3%, and 7.6% of people did not answer the census question.

Of those at least 15 years old, 369 (24.2%) people had a bachelor's or higher degree, 759 (49.7%) had a post-high school certificate or diploma, and 396 (25.9%) people exclusively held high school qualifications. The median income was $39,400, compared with $41,500 nationally. 168 people (11.0%) earned over $100,000 compared to 12.1% nationally. The employment status of those at least 15 was 711 (46.6%) full-time, 237 (15.5%) part-time, and 54 (3.5%) unemployed.

== Education ==
Kawaha Point School is a co-educational state primary school for Year 1 to 6 students, with a roll of 218 as of July 2025. The school teaches some classes in the Māori language. The school opened in 1979.

== Transport ==
Kawaha has been served by a bus since at least 1943 and now has a half-hourly service. Ngongotahā cycleway, which was opened in 2012, runs to the west of Kawaha.
