= Selwyn Heights =

Suburb of Rotorua, New Zealand

- Suburb
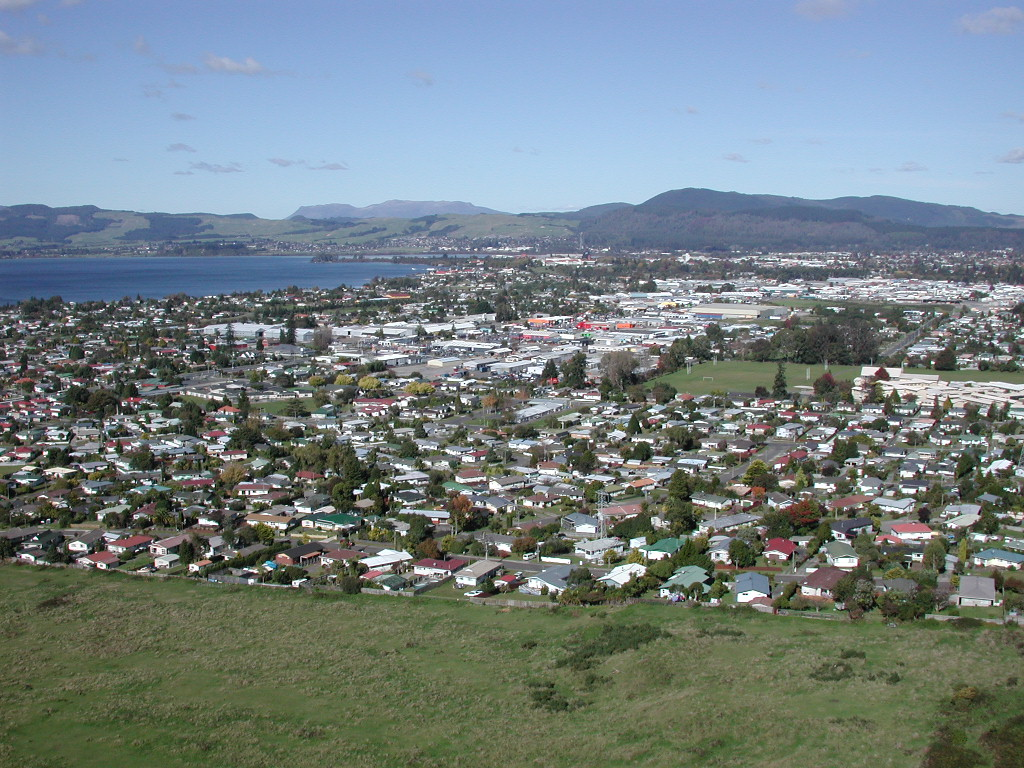
- Selwyn Heights (foreground) with Western Heights in the middle-right
- Interactive map of Selwyn Heights
- Coordinates: 38.117718°S 176.223459°E
- Country: New Zealand
- City: Rotorua
- Local authority: Rotorua Lakes Council
- Electoral ward: Te Ipu Wai Auraki General Ward

Area
  - Land: 89 ha (220 acres)

Population (June 2025)
  - Total: 1,180
  - Density: 1,300/km^{2} (3,400/sq mi)

	Ngongotahā	Fairy Springs
Ngongotahā Valley	Selwyn Heights
	Western Heights	Mangakakahi

Selwyn Heights is a suburb of Rotorua in the Bay of Plenty Region of New Zealand's North Island.

== Demographics ==
Selwyn Heights covers 0.89 km^{2} (0.34 sq mi) and had an estimated population of 1,180 as of June 2025, with a population density of 1,326 people per km^{2}.

Historical population
Year	Pop.	±% p.a.
2006	1,128	—
2013	1,047	−1.06%
2018	1,134	+1.61%
2023	1,113	−0.37%

Selwyn Heights had a population of 1,113 in the 2023 New Zealand census, a decrease of 21 people (−1.9%) since the 2018 census, and an increase of 66 people (6.3%) since the 2013 census. There were 552 males, 555 females, and 3 people of other genders in 351 dwellings. 4.0% of people identified as LGBTIQ+. The median age was 32.2 years (compared with 38.1 years nationally). There were 249 people (22.4%) aged under 15 years, 264 (23.7%) aged 15 to 29, 468 (42.0%) aged 30 to 64, and 129 (11.6%) aged 65 or older.

People could identify as more than one ethnicity. The results were 57.4% European (Pākehā); 57.1% Māori; 10.5% Pasifika; 5.4% Asian; 0.3% Middle Eastern, Latin American and African New Zealanders (MELAA); and 1.1% other, which includes people giving their ethnicity as "New Zealander". English was spoken by 97.6%, Māori by 14.8%, Samoan by 1.3%, and other languages by 5.4%. No language could be spoken by 1.9% (e.g. too young to talk). New Zealand Sign Language was known by 0.8%. The percentage of people born overseas was 12.4, compared with 28.8% nationally.

Religious affiliations were 26.1% Christian, 1.3% Hindu, 0.3% Islam, 5.4% Māori religious beliefs, 0.5% Buddhist, 0.5% New Age, and 1.3% other religions. People who answered that they had no religion were 55.0%, and 10.0% of people did not answer the census question.

Of those at least 15 years old, 99 (11.5%) people had a bachelor's or higher degree, 498 (57.6%) had a post-high school certificate or diploma, and 264 (30.6%) people exclusively held high school qualifications. The median income was $37,000, compared with $41,500 nationally. 36 people (4.2%) earned over $100,000 compared to 12.1% nationally. The employment status of those at least 15 was 444 (51.4%) full-time, 84 (9.7%) part-time, and 45 (5.2%) unemployed.

== Education ==
Selwyn School is a co-educational state primary school, with a roll of 343 as of July 2025. It offers education in both English and Māori languages.

Rotorua Specialist School – Te Kura Pūkenga o Rotorua (formerly Kea Street Specialist School) is also located in Selwyn Heights. The roll was 102 as of July 2025. It provides education to students with intellectual or physical disabilities. It opened in 1964.
