= Henry Taiporutu Te Mapu-o-te-rangi Mitchell =

New Zealand Ngāti Pikiao leader, farmer, surveyor and land supervisor

Henry Taiporutu Te Mapu-o-te-rangi Mitchell (5 May 1877 – 5 May 1944) was a notable New Zealand Ngāti Pikiao leader, farmer, surveyor, land development supervisor and community leader. Of Māori descent, he identified with both the Ngati Pikiao and Te Arawa iwi. He was born in Ohinemutu, Rotorua/Taupo, New Zealand on 5 May 1877.
