= Merekotia Amohau =

New Zealand singer, entertainer and composer

Merekotia Amohau (16 April 1898–30 December 1978) was a New Zealand singer, entertainer and composer.

== Early life ==
Amohau was born in Ohinemutu, Rotorua, New Zealand on 16 April 1898. Of Māori descent, she was the youngest child of Hēnare Mete Amohau, a prominent leader of the Te Arawa iwi, and his wife, Tūkau Te Hira, of the Ngāti Pikiao iwi. Her education took place at Ōhinemutu and Maketū, and then from 1911 onwards she attended the Queen Victoria School for Māori Girls in Auckland.

== Career ==
Amohau's early musical career was guided by F. A. Bennett, the superintendent of the Māori mission at Rotorua at the time. In 1915, Bennett's Māori Opera Company performed Hinemoa, in which Amohau played the role of Tupa. The production received mixed reviews. In 1920, Amohau played the lead role in the comic opera Mārama, to great success, leading to a nationwide tour of the show. She reprised this role in 1940.

Amohau was a member of the Rotorua Māori Choir and of Saint Faith's choir in Ōhinemutu. In 1930 she recorded Aroha Pūmai.

Amohau became a foundation menber of Te Rōpū o te Ora Māori Women's Health League, upon its foundation by Robina Cameron in 1937. She was involved with the Taipōrutu Club, advising leaders, tutoring waiata, composing songs and performing and travelling alongside them. As well as composing traditional and contemporary Māori music, Amohau became an expert on historical Te Arawa chants.

== Personal life ==
On the 4 February 1939, Amohau married Rongomaiwhiti Winiata in Ōhinemutu. Amohau had six children in total, three of whom she had with Winiata. She died in Rotorua on 30 December 1978. She was buried at Kauae cemetery in Ngongotahā.Amohau is the great-aunt of Anania Amohau who composed the words of the anthem of the 28th Maori Battalion.
