= Inez Kingi =

New Zealand health advocate (1931–2022)

Inez Kingi QSO MNZM JP
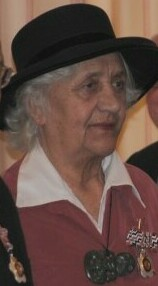
- Kingi in 2009
- Born: Inez Haereata Hayward; 1 January 1931; Ōhinemutu, New Zealand
- Died: 27 July 2022 (aged 91); Ōhinemutu, New Zealand
- Resting place: Kauae Cemetery
- Occupations: Health advocate; dental nurse
- Spouse: Hamilton Manaia Pihopa Kingi (m. 1955; died 2017)
- Children: 4

Inez Haereata Kingi QSO MNZM JP (née Hayward; 1 January 1931 – 27 July 2022) was a New Zealand health advocate for Māori people and for women and children. Beginning her career as a dental nurse, Kingi was instrumental in establishing a number of healthcare organisations in Rotorua with a particular focus on Māori and women's health.

== Life and career ==
Kingi was born in Ōhinemutu, part of Rotorua, on 1 January 1931. She was the youngest of 12 children. Her mother was part of the iwi (tribe) of Ngāti Whakaue, and her father was English. She attended Rotorua Primary School and Rotorua High and Grammar School. In her early career she worked as a school dental nurse (having been awarded the director's medal for outstanding excellence in her Wellington Dental School course in 1952) and became involved in women's and Māori health. In 1955 she married Pihopa Kingi at St Faith's Church in Ōhinemutu. They went on to have three sons and one daughter together.

From 1978 to 2003, Kingi served as the president of the Women's Health League, a Rotorua-based organisation. In this role she worked to promote the health of Māori women and children, developed government relationships, and supported the establishment of activities for kaumātua (tribal elders). In 1983, she began working to establish a health centre at Tūnohopū Marae. A centre had been suggested by Ruby Cameron, the founder and first president of the league, who had died in 1971. The centre was built on land owned by Kingi's husband, and he became the centre's first administrator. It opened in 1986. The centre used both traditional Māori health practices and Western medicine, and was dedicated to Cameron.

In the 1990s, Kingi founded an addiction treatment service called Te Utuhina Manaakitanga Trust, which was described by the Rotorua Daily Post in 2013 as "one of the country's most successful alcohol and addiction treatment services". She also established Tipu Ora Health Centre in Ōhinemutu, a mother and child healthcare programme, and served as national coordinator of the Tipu Ora Charitable Trust. Te Utuhina Manaakitanga Trust and Tipu Ora later merged to become Manaaki Ora, which continues to provide services in the Rotorua district as of 2022. In the mid-1990s she played a key role in the foundation of the Te Ao Marama Māori Dental Association, after becoming concerned that there were only three Māori dentists working in New Zealand. She was elected founding chair of the organisation. In 1997 she established a programme titled Hei Oranga Niho mo te Iwi Māori, which enabled fifth-year dental students to provide services free of charge to the Māori community.

Kingi served as Māori Advisor to the Health Department. She was also a member of the Marae Heritage and Facilities Committee of the New Zealand Lotteries Commission, a member of the Rotorua High Schools Board of Governors, a member of the Auckland Medical School pre-selection committee, and chair of the national Maori Health Workforce committee and Rotorua District Council's recreation and sports committees.

== Awards and legacy ==
In 1993, Kingi received the New Zealand Suffrage Centennial Medal 1993. In the 2000 New Year Honours, Kingi and her husband were each appointed as a Member of the New Zealand Order of Merit, for their services to the community. In the 2009 Queen's Birthday Honours, they were each appointed as a Companion of the Queen's Service Order.

Kingi's husband died in 2017, aged 88. In 2013 he had written a book about her life and work titled The Life & Times of Inez Haereata Kingi. Kingi herself died on 27 July 2022, after suffering from dementia for 12 years. On the same day, New Zealand MP Arena Williams acknowledged her death in Parliament. She was described by Radio New Zealand as "Rotorua's queen of Māori health".
