= Ohinemutu =

Suburb of Rotorua, New Zealand

- Suburb
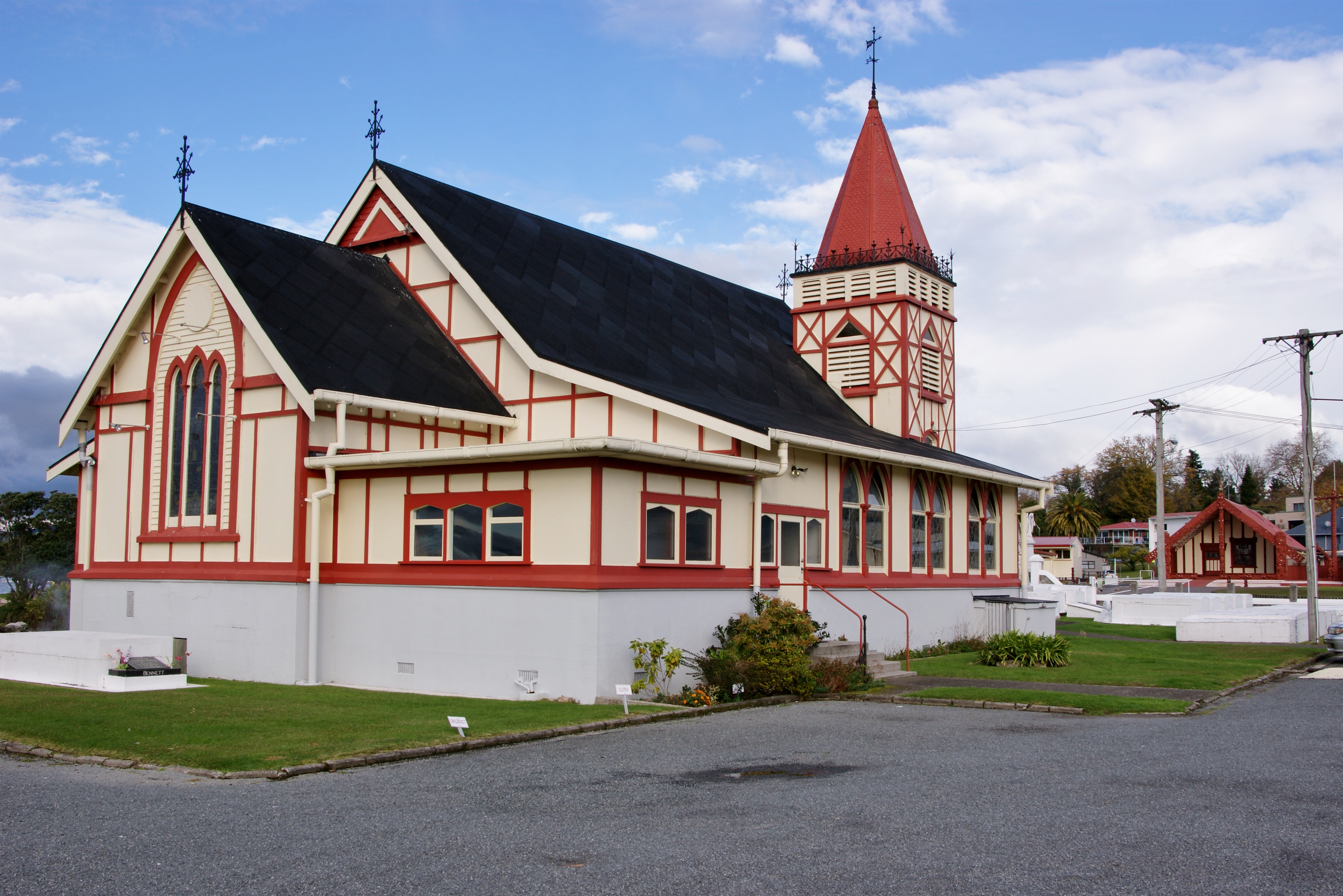
- St Faith's Anglican Church
- Interactive map of Ohinemutu
- Coordinates: 38.129°S 176.245°E
- Country: New Zealand
- City: Rotorua
- Local authority: Rotorua Lakes Council
- Electoral ward: Te Ipu Wai Auraki General Ward

Area
  - Land: 121 ha (300 acres)

Population (June 2025)
  - Total: 1,100
  - Density: 910/km^{2} (2,400/sq mi)

| Koutu | Lake Rotorua | (Lake Rotorua) |
| Mangakakahi | Ohinemutu | Lake Rotorua |
| Utuhina | Victoria | Rotorua Central |

Ohinemutu is a suburb in Rotorua, New Zealand. It includes a living Māori village and the original settlement of Rotorua. The organiser of a celebration for the area having been settled for 650 years said it has been continuously inhabited since 1365.

== Demographics ==
The statistical area of Kuirau, which corresponds to Ohinemutu, covers 1.21 km^{2} (0.47 sq mi) and had an estimated population of 1,100 as of June 2025, with a population density of 909 people per km^{2}.

Historical population
| Year | Pop. | ±% p.a. |
|---|---|---|
| 2006 | 927 | — |
| 2013 | 921 | −0.09% |
| 2018 | 1,065 | +2.95% |
| 2023 | 1,080 | +0.28% |

Kuirau had a population of 1,080 in the 2023 New Zealand census, an increase of 15 people (1.4%) since the 2018 census, and an increase of 159 people (17.3%) since the 2013 census. There were 549 males, 528 females, and 3 people of other genders in 429 dwellings. 2.5% of people identified as LGBTIQ+. The median age was 35.5 years (compared with 38.1 years nationally). There were 228 people (21.1%) aged under 15 years, 219 (20.3%) aged 15 to 29, 477 (44.2%) aged 30 to 64, and 156 (14.4%) aged 65 or older.

People could identify as more than one ethnicity. The results were 35.0% European (Pākehā); 67.8% Māori; 9.4% Pasifika; 14.4% Asian; 0.3% Middle Eastern, Latin American and African New Zealanders (MELAA); and 0.6% other, which includes people giving their ethnicity as "New Zealander". English was spoken by 94.2%, Māori by 29.7%, and other languages by 11.4%. No language could be spoken by 2.5% (e.g. too young to talk). New Zealand Sign Language was known by 0.8%. The percentage of people born overseas was 18.3, compared with 28.8% nationally.

Religious affiliations were 34.4% Christian, 3.3% Hindu, 0.3% Islam, 7.2% Māori religious beliefs, 0.8% Buddhist, 0.3% New Age, and 1.7% other religions. People who answered that they had no religion were 47.5%, and 5.6% of people did not answer the census question.

Of those at least 15 years old, 168 (19.7%) people had a bachelor's or higher degree, 447 (52.5%) had a post-high school certificate or diploma, and 246 (28.9%) people exclusively held high school qualifications. The median income was $33,900, compared with $41,500 nationally. 45 people (5.3%) earned over $100,000 compared to 12.1% nationally. The employment status of those at least 15 was 396 (46.5%) full-time, 117 (13.7%) part-time, and 51 (6.0%) unemployed.

== Marae ==
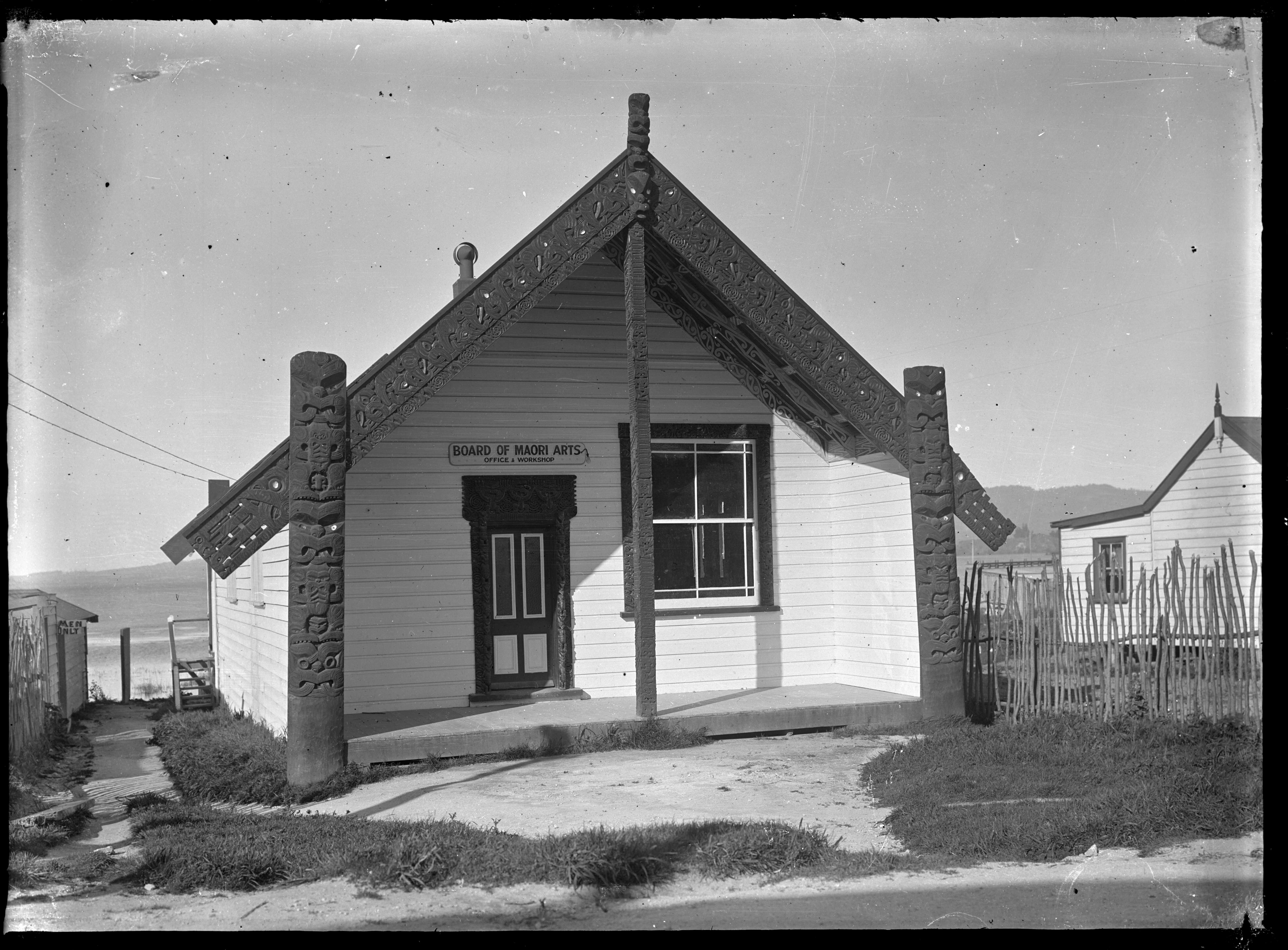
Te Ao Marama meeting house in Ohinemutu in the 1930s

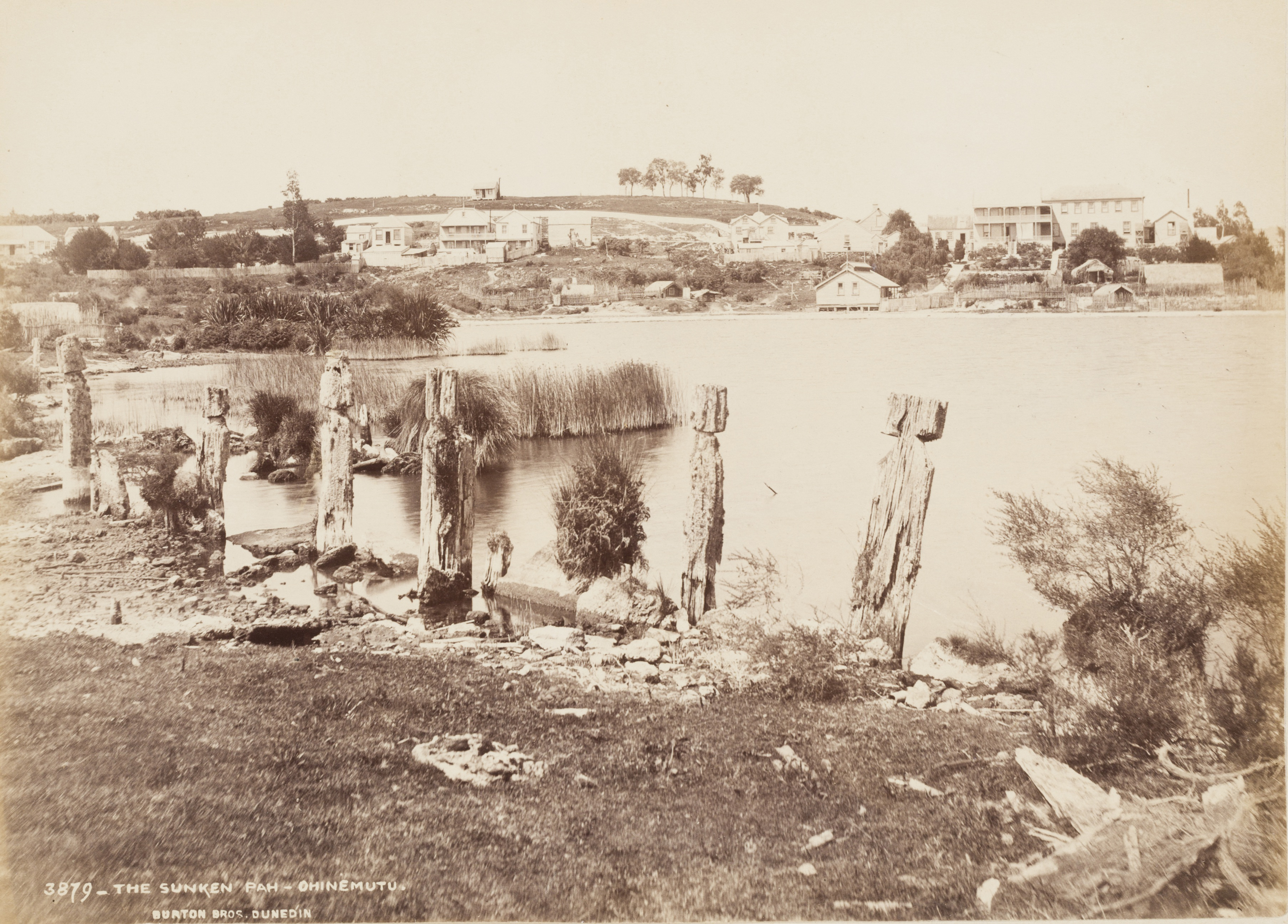
The Sunken Pā, Ohinemutu SLNSW FL10386959

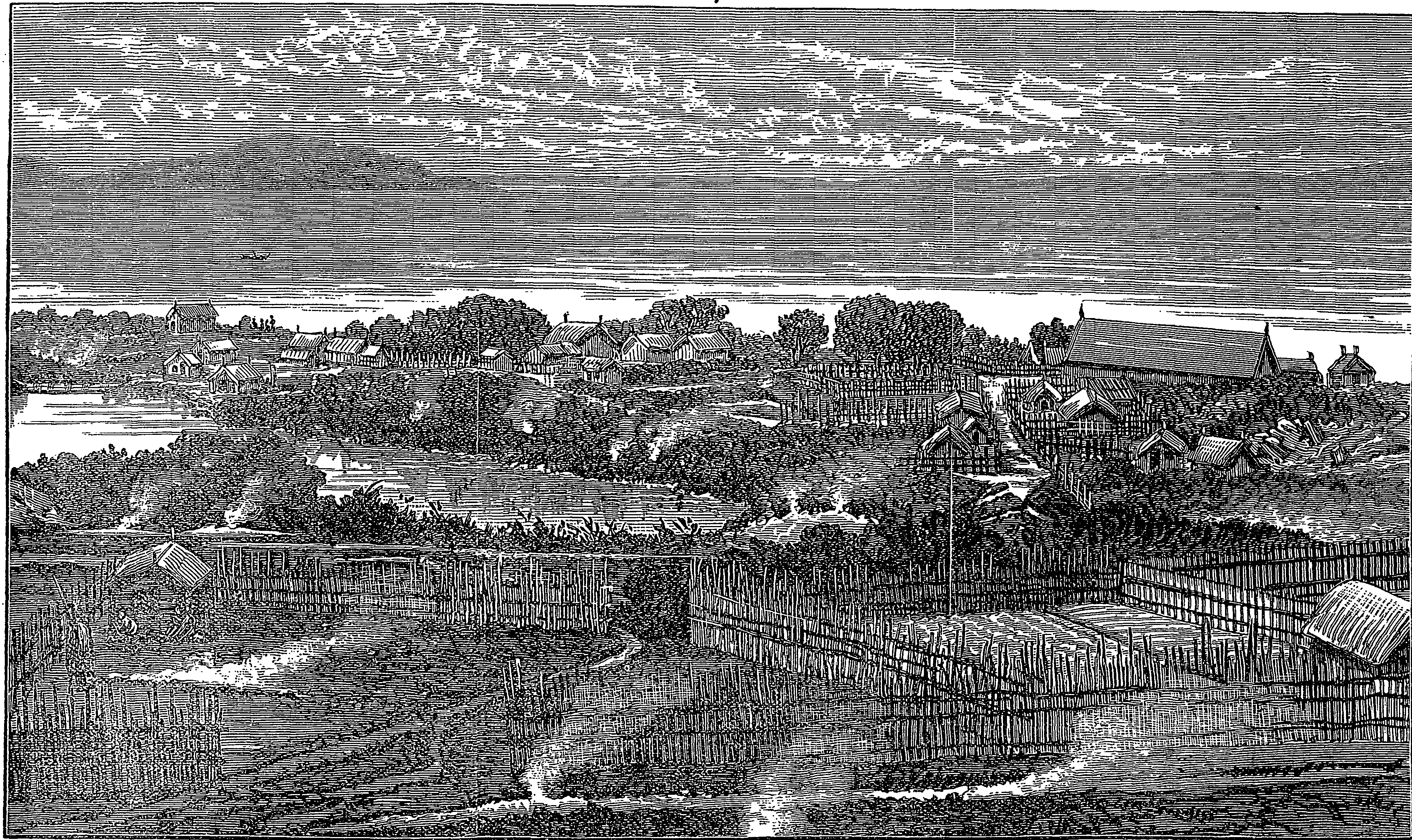
1880 sketch of Ohinemutu

The Ohinemutu area has four marae:

- Te Kuirau or Utuhina Marae and Te Roro o Te Rangi meeting house is a meeting place of the Ngāti Whakaue hapū of Ngāti te Roro o te Rangi.
- Te Papaiouru Marae and Tamatekapua meeting house is a meeting place of the Ngāti Whakaue hapū of Ngāti Hurunga Te Rangi, Ngāti Pūkaki, Ngāti Taeotu, Ngāti Te Rangiwaho, Ngāti te Roro o te Rangi and Ngāti Tūnohopū.
- Para te Hoata or Tūnohopū Marae and Tūnohopū meeting house is a meeting place of the Ngāti Whakaue hapū of Ngāti Tūnohopū and Ngāti Whakaue.
- Waikite Marae and Tiki meeting house is a meeting place of the Ngāti Whakaue hapū of Ngāti Whakaue.

== Notable people ==
- Merekotia Amohau
- Inez Kingi
- Henry Taiporutu Te Mapu-o-te-rangi Mitchell
- Maata Horomona
