= Western Heights, Rotorua =

Suburb of Rotorua, New Zealand

Western Heights
- Suburb
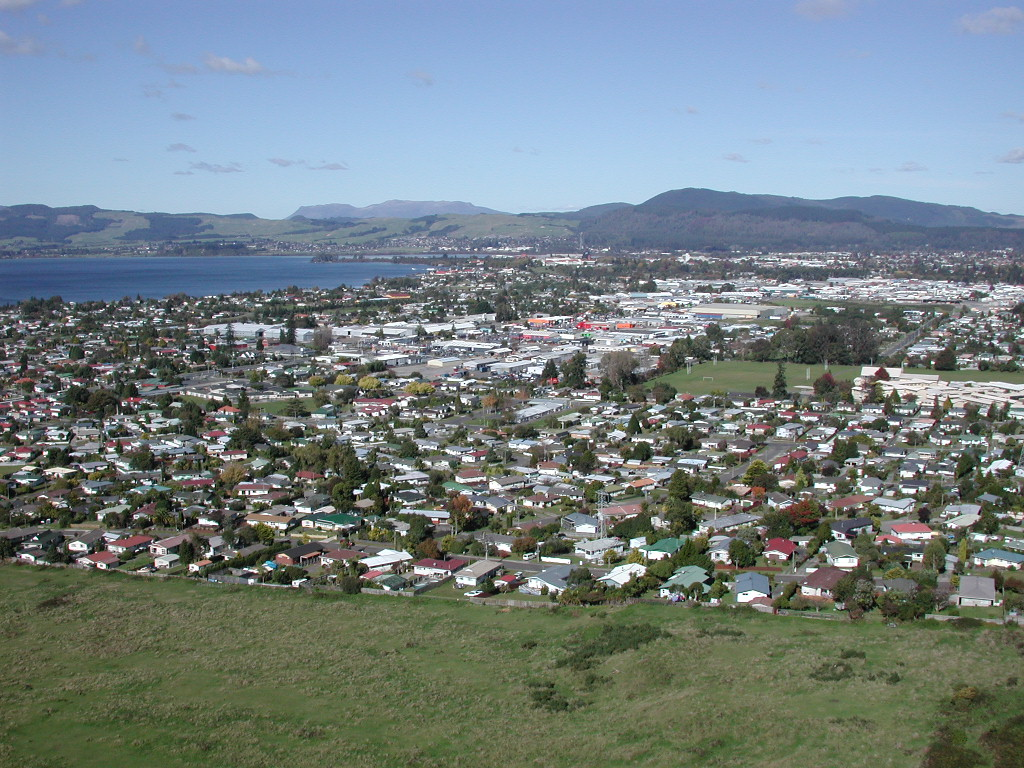
- Selwyn Heights High School is the green square in the middle-right, with the suburb behind it and to the right
- Interactive map of Western Heights
- Coordinates: 38.127505°S 176.210809°E
- Country: New Zealand
- City: Rotorua
- Local authority: Rotorua Lakes Council
- Electoral ward: Te Ipu Wai Auraki General Ward

Area
  - Land: 238 ha (590 acres)

Population (June 2025)
  - Total: 5,010
  - Density: 2,110/km^{2} (5,450/sq mi)

	Selwyn Heights	Fairy Springs
Ngongotahā Valley	Western Heights
Pukehangi		Mangakakahi

Western Heights is a suburb of Rotorua in the Bay of Plenty Region of New Zealand's North Island.

== Demographics ==
Western Heights covers 2.38 km^{2} (0.92 sq mi) and had an estimated population of 5,010 as of June 2025, with a population density of 2,105 people per km^{2}.

Historical population
Year	Pop.	±% p.a.
2006	4,092	—
2013	3,822	−0.97%
2018	4,404	+2.88%
2023	4,731	+1.44%

Western Heights had a population of 4,731 in the 2023 New Zealand census, an increase of 327 people (7.4%) since the 2018 census, and an increase of 909 people (23.8%) since the 2013 census. There were 2,283 males, 2,421 females, and 27 people of other genders in 1,401 dwellings. 2.9% of people identified as LGBTIQ+. The median age was 29.1 years (compared with 38.1 years nationally). There were 1,314 people (27.8%) aged under 15 years, 1,113 (23.5%) aged 15 to 29, 1,854 (39.2%) aged 30 to 64, and 450 (9.5%) aged 65 or older.

People could identify as more than one ethnicity. The results were 50.2% European (Pākehā); 64.1% Māori; 11.0% Pasifika; 5.6% Asian; 0.3% Middle Eastern, Latin American and African New Zealanders (MELAA); and 1.0% other, which includes people giving their ethnicity as "New Zealander". English was spoken by 95.1%, Māori by 19.3%, Samoan by 1.0%, and other languages by 6.1%. No language could be spoken by 3.2% (e.g. too young to talk). New Zealand Sign Language was known by 0.8%. The percentage of people born overseas was 11.3, compared with 28.8% nationally.

Religious affiliations were 27.3% Christian, 0.5% Hindu, 0.1% Islam, 5.9% Māori religious beliefs, 0.6% Buddhist, 0.7% New Age, 0.1% Jewish, and 0.9% other religions. People who answered that they had no religion were 55.5%, and 9.0% of people did not answer the census question.

Of those at least 15 years old, 366 (10.7%) people had a bachelor's or higher degree, 1,986 (58.1%) had a post-high school certificate or diploma, and 1,062 (31.1%) people exclusively held high school qualifications. The median income was $33,800, compared with $41,500 nationally. 117 people (3.4%) earned over $100,000 compared to 12.1% nationally. The employment status of those at least 15 was 1,596 (46.7%) full-time, 387 (11.3%) part-time, and 240 (7.0%) unemployed.

Individual statistical areas
Name	Area (km^{2})	Population	Density (per km^{2})	Dwellings	Median age	Median income
Pleasant Heights	1.35	2,223	1,647	651	30.3 years	$36,300
Western Heights	1.03	2,505	2,432	750	28.0 years	$31,800
New Zealand					38.1 years	$41,500

== Education ==
Western Heights has two state primary schools for Year 1 to 6 students: Western Heights School, established 1958, with a roll of 395; and Aorangi School, with a roll of 82.

St Michael's Catholic School is a state-integrated Catholic primary school for Year 1 to 6 students, with a roll of 94. It opened in 1958.

Kaitao Intermediate is a state intermediate school, with a roll of 253. It opened in 1969.

Western Heights High School is a state secondary school, with a roll of 1,249. It opened in 1961.

All these schools are co-educational. Rolls are as of March 2026.
