= Mangakakahi =

Suburb of Rotorua, New Zealand

- Suburb
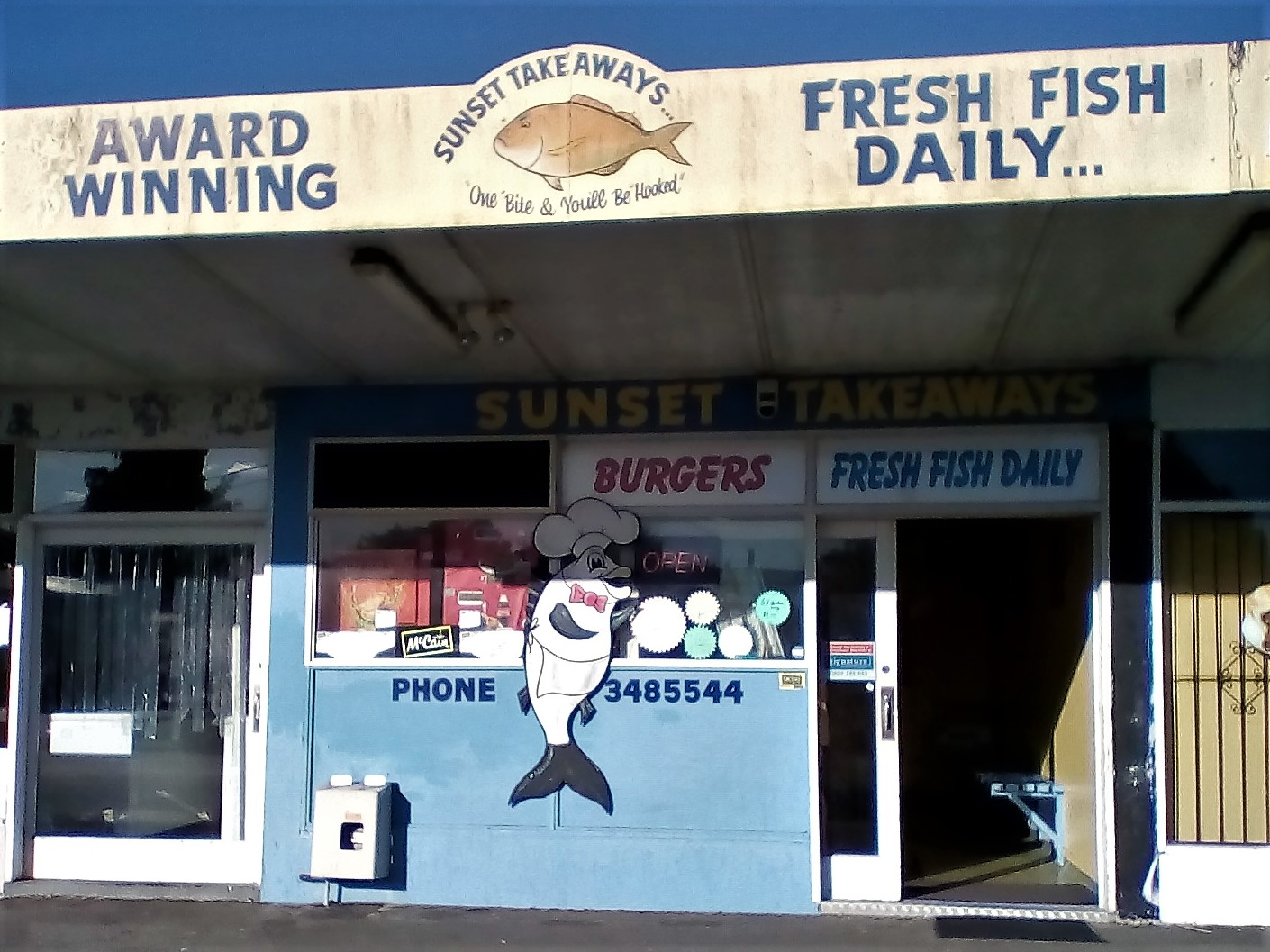
- Sunset Fish and Chip Shop
- Interactive map of Mangakakahi
- Coordinates: 38.133281°S 176.234188°E
- Country: New Zealand
- City: Rotorua
- Local authority: Rotorua Lakes Council
- Electoral ward: Te Ipu Wai Auraki General Ward

Area
  - Land: 281 ha (690 acres)

Population (June 2025)
  - Total: 2,380
  - Density: 847/km^{2} (2,190/sq mi)

Western Heights	Fairy Springs	Ohinemutu
Pukehangi	Mangakakahi
Fordlands	Utuhina	Victoria

Mangakakahi is a suburb of Rotorua in the Bay of Plenty Region of New Zealand's North Island.

== Demographics ==
Mangakakahi covers 2.81 km^{2} (1.08 sq mi) and had an estimated population of 2,380 as of June 2025, with a population density of 847 people per km^{2}.

Historical population
Year	Pop.	±% p.a.
2006	2,109	—
2013	2,055	−0.37%
2018	2,244	+1.78%
2023	2,223	−0.19%

Mangakakahi had a population of 2,223 in the 2023 New Zealand census, a decrease of 21 people (−0.9%) since the 2018 census, and an increase of 168 people (8.2%) since the 2013 census. There were 1,110 males, 1,101 females, and 12 people of other genders in 681 dwellings. 3.0% of people identified as LGBTIQ+. The median age was 32.0 years (compared with 38.1 years nationally). There were 561 people (25.2%) aged under 15 years, 483 (21.7%) aged 15 to 29, 978 (44.0%) aged 30 to 64, and 201 (9.0%) aged 65 or older.

People could identify as more than one ethnicity. The results were 52.0% European (Pākehā); 54.9% Māori; 11.1% Pasifika; 8.4% Asian; 0.5% Middle Eastern, Latin American and African New Zealanders (MELAA); and 0.8% other, which includes people giving their ethnicity as "New Zealander". English was spoken by 94.7%, Māori by 18.4%, Samoan by 0.7%, and other languages by 7.2%. No language could be spoken by 3.2% (e.g. too young to talk). New Zealand Sign Language was known by 0.4%. The percentage of people born overseas was 15.0, compared with 28.8% nationally.

Religious affiliations were 29.4% Christian, 0.7% Hindu, 0.3% Islam, 5.8% Māori religious beliefs, 0.5% Buddhist, 0.5% New Age, 0.1% Jewish, and 1.2% other religions. People who answered that they had no religion were 54.4%, and 7.7% of people did not answer the census question.

Of those at least 15 years old, 186 (11.2%) people had a bachelor's or higher degree, 1,008 (60.6%) had a post-high school certificate or diploma, and 474 (28.5%) people exclusively held high school qualifications. The median income was $38,300, compared with $41,500 nationally. 57 people (3.4%) earned over $100,000 compared to 12.1% nationally. The employment status of those at least 15 was 873 (52.5%) full-time, 222 (13.4%) part-time, and 105 (6.3%) unemployed.

Individual statistical areas
Name	Area (km^{2})	Population	Density (per km^{2})	Dwellings	Median age	Median income
Mangakakahi Central	1.79	60	34	30	51.2 years	$39,300
Mangakakahi West	1.02	2,163	2,121	654	31.6 years	$38,300
New Zealand					38.1 years	$41,500

== Education ==
Sunset Primary School is a co-educational state primary school, with a roll of 156 as of March 2026.

Te Kura Kaupapa Māori o Hurungaterangi is a co-educational Māori language immersion school for Year 1 to 8 students, with a roll of 95. It opened in 1997 at the Hurungaterangi marae, and moved to its current site in 2005.

Te Āhuru Mōwai, formerly Rotorua School for Young Parents, is also located in Mangakakahi.

Sunset Intermediate School, later called Sunset Junior High School, opened in 1959 and closed in 2007.
