= 2024 Tauranga mayoral election =

Tauranga mayoral election

- 20 July 2024
- Turnout: 42,632 (38.98 ▼1.43 pp)
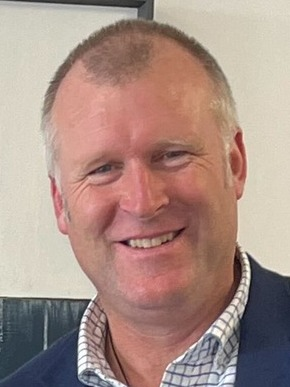

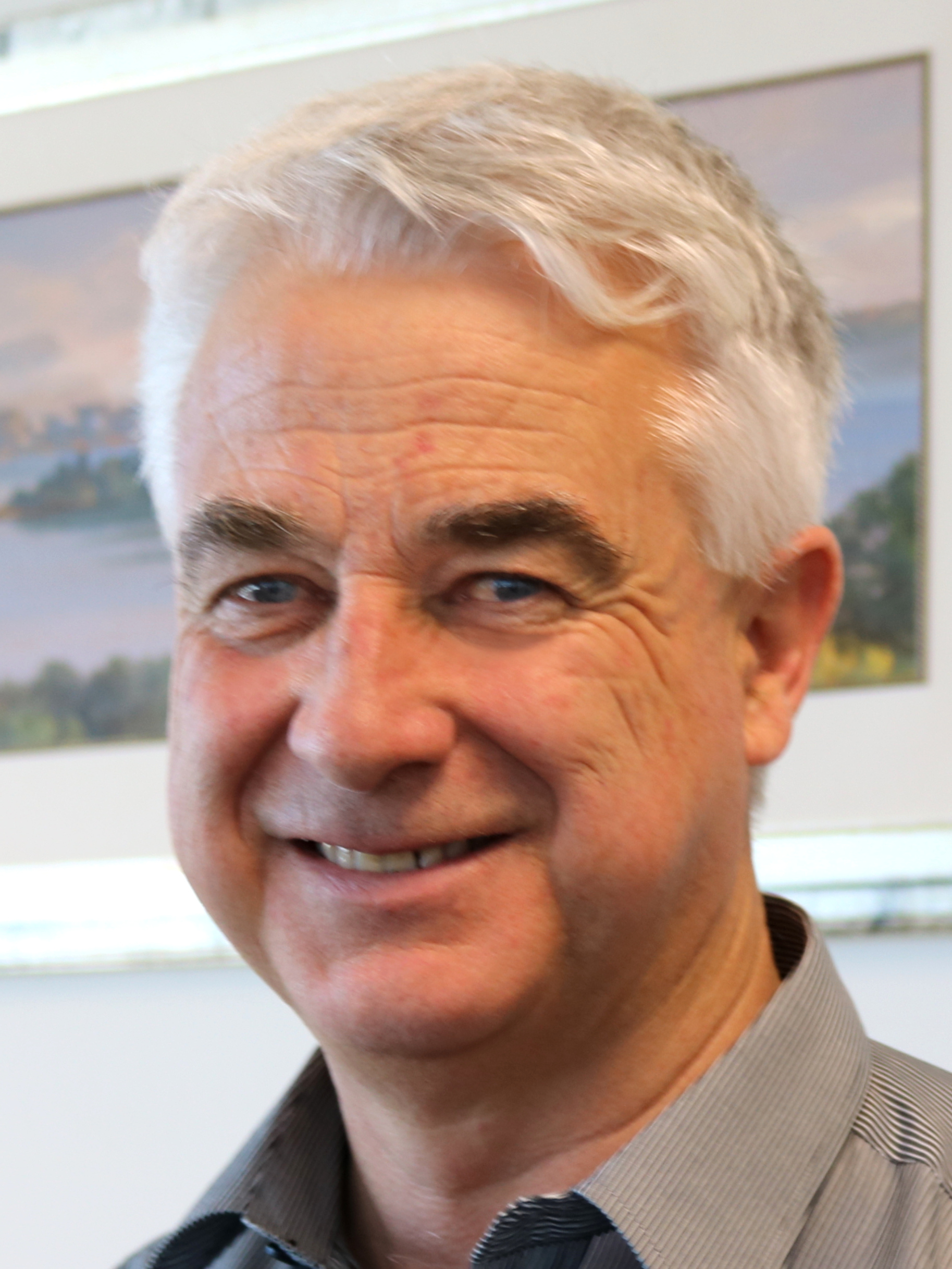

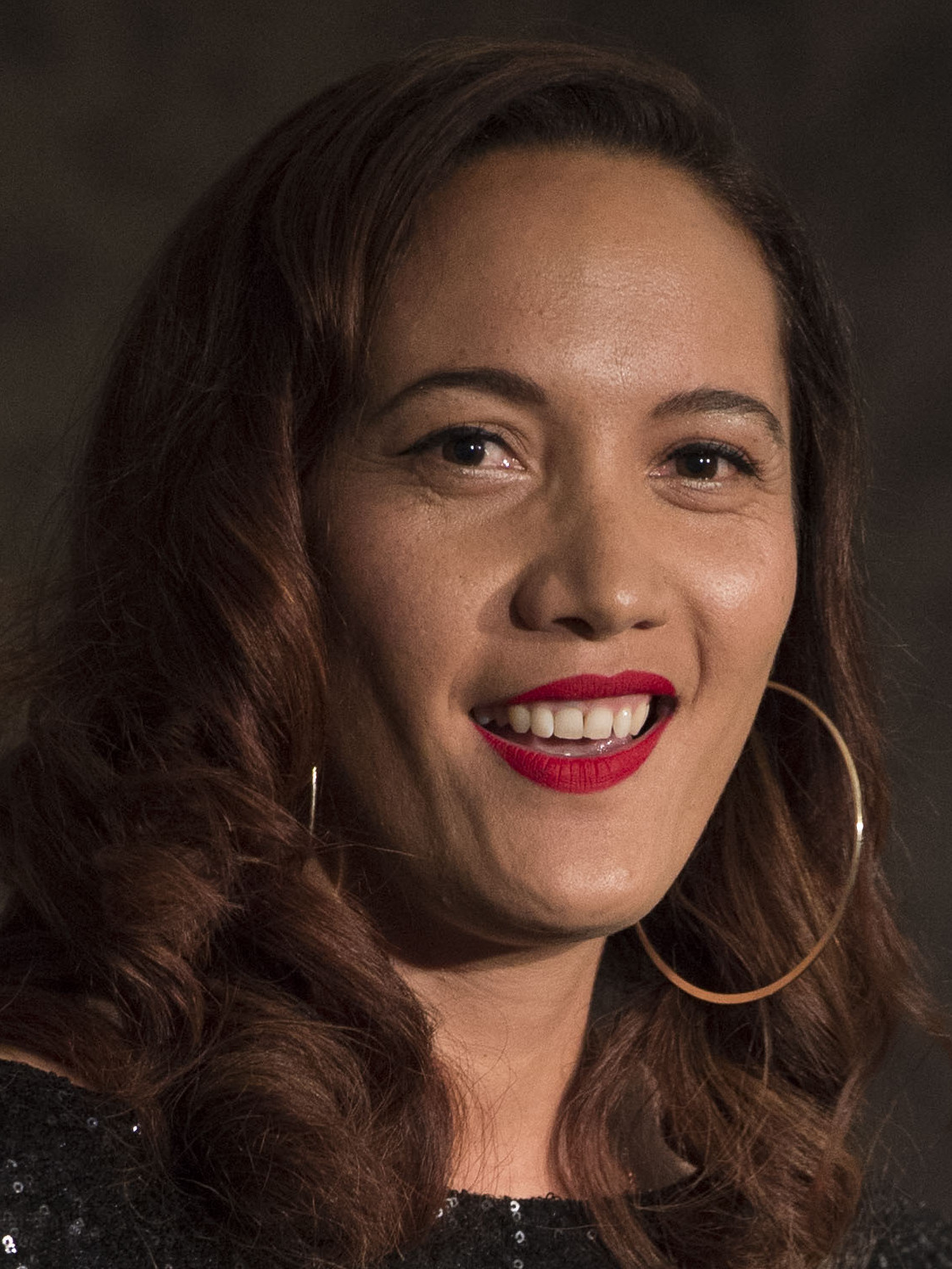

Candidate	Mahé Drysdale	Greg Brownless
Affiliation	Independent	Independent
Primary vote	10,147	5,785
Percentage	23.80%	13.57%
Final vote	16,606	10,510
Candidate	Ria Hall	Tina Salisbury
Affiliation	Independent	Independent
Primary vote	6,808	5,096
Percentage	15.97%	11.95%
Final vote	eliminated	eliminated
- Margin of victory by ward (primary vote)
Mayor before election
Under commission
Elected mayor
Mahé Drysdale
Independent

The 2024 Tauranga mayoral election was held to elect the mayor of Tauranga as part of the 2024 Tauranga local elections. The election took place between 29 June and 20 July 2024, with the official results released on 25 July. It was the first election since the Minister of Local Government appointed a Crown Commission on 9 February 2021 to oversee all of Tauranga City Council's governance responsibilities. The election was held using the Single Transferable Vote system.

Mahé Drysdale was elected as mayor.

== Background ==
The last mayor, Tenby Powell, was elected to the office in October 2019 but resigned in November 2020, eight months after he was unanimously censured by his council for an angry outburst. Following further mayoral "outbursts," Powell publicly called for the Minister of Local Government to appoint a commission to replace the "dysfunctional" council. The decision to cancel the election for a new mayor and councillors, and the appointment of a crown commission instead by Local Government minister Nanaia Mahuta was not without controversy. A legal opinion by law firm Russell McVeagh found her decision may have been "unlawful" and Tauranga MP Simon Bridges called the decision "dramatic and draconian", while saying that Powell quitting removed "a significant source of friction" and it was reasonable to assume the council would become more functional with the election of a new Mayor and Councillors.

The 2022 local elections were cancelled by the government and the commission will remain in place until an election for members of the Tauranga City Council is held on 20 July 2024. Additionally, the Minister also decided to postpone the 2025 local election in Tauranga until 2028. The council elected in 2024 will thus serve a four year term, a first for New Zealand.

== Key dates ==
Key dates for the election are:

- 19 April: Last day to switch electoral roll.
- 26 April: Nominations opened for candidates.
- 24 May: Nominations close.
- 29 June – 3 July: Voting papers delivered.
- 29 June: Special voting begins.
- 20 July: Polling day. Voting documents needed to be at council before voting closes at 12 noon. Preliminary results available as soon as all ordinary votes are counted.
- 23–25 July: Official results, including all valid ordinary and special votes, declared.

== Candidates ==
Candidate	Ticket (if any)	Notes
Tanya Bamford-King	Independent	
Aureliu Braguta	Independent	
Greg Brownless	Community Focus - Responsible Spending	Mayor 2016–2019
Andrew Caie	Independent	
Mahé Drysdale		Olympic champion rower, grandson of former mayor Bob Owens
Anthony Goddard		
Chudleigh Haggett		
Ria Hall		Musician and television presenter
Donna Hannah		
BOP Hori		Also stood in 2016
Tim Maltby	Our Rates are too High	
Jos Nagels	Visionary Leadership, Not Repeatership	
Douglas Owens	Independent	Former Bay of Plenty regional councillor. Son of former mayor Bob Owens, uncle of Mahé Drysdale
John Robson	Principled; Professional; Democratic	Councillor 2013-2016, 2018-2021
Tina Salisbury	People and Progress over Politics	Deputy mayor 2020–2021

=== Withdrawn ===
- Eric Chuah
- B A (Brian) Friend

== Results ==
The official results were released on 25 July, showing Mahé Drysdale was elected as mayor. Voter turnout was 38.77%, which compares with a turnout of 40.28% at the 2019 election.

=== Overall ===
2024 Tauranga mayoral election
Affiliation	Candidate	Primary vote	%	Final vote (Note: Rounded to whole number.)
Independent	Mahé Drysdale	10,147	23.80	16,606
Independent	Greg Brownless	5,785	13.57	10,510
Independent	Ria Hall	6,808	15.97	
Independent	Tina Salisbury	5,096	11.95	
Independent	Tim Maltby	3,287	7.71	
Independent	Douglas Owens	3,287	7.71	
Independent	John Robson	3,012	7.07	
Independent	Andrew Caie	1,273	2.99	
Independent	Tanya Bamford-King	898	2.11	
Independent	Jos Nagels	789	1.85	
Independent	Anthony Goddard	717	1.68	
Independent	Aureliu Braguta	480	1.13	
Independent	Chudleigh Haggett	237	0.56	
Independent	Donna Hannah	145	0.34	
Independent	BOP Hori	141	0.33	
Valid		42,323	99.28	
Informal		129	0.30	
Blank		180	0.42	
Total		42,632	38.98	
Registered		109,381		
Independent win				

=== Primary vote by ward ===
Primary vote by ward
Ward	Margin (pp)	Drysdale	Brownless	Hall	Salisbury	Other	Total
Arataki	12.93	1,355	666	609	586	2,112	5,328
Bethlehem	10.65	1,493	890	513	777	1,988	5,661
Matua-Otūmoetai	3.82	1,372	1,142	709	861	1,942	6,026
Mauao/Mount Maunganui	14.16	1,231	579	604	571	1,442	4,427
Pāpāmoa	13.32	1,252	607	621	394	1,865	4,739
Tauriko	14.62	1,269	610	421	604	1,604	4,508
Te Awanui	75.99	149	42	2,175	83	217	2,666
Te Papa	9.17	890	547	493	453	1,357	3,740
Welcome Bay	8.30	1,136	702	663	767	1,960	5,228
Total	7.89	10,147	5,785	6,808	5,096	14,487	42,323
