= Eric Faulkner (mayor) =

New Zealand politician

Eric Faulkner CStJ JP

23rd Mayor of Tauranga
- In office 25 October 1977 – 22 October 1980
- Preceded by: Bob Owens
- Succeeded by: Ray Dillon

Personal details
- Born: Eric Lees Faulkner; 27 December 1919; Tauranga, New Zealand
- Died: 30 May 1997 (aged 77)
- Spouse: Constance Winifred Crawford (m. 1947)
- Children: 4
- Relatives: John Lees Faulkner (great-grandfather)
- Education: Tauranga District High School
- Occupation: Supermarket operator

Eric Lees Faulkner CStJ JP (27 December 1919 – 30 May 1997) was a New Zealand local-body politician. He served as mayor of Tauranga from 1977 to 1980.

== Early life and family ==
Born in Tauranga on 27 December 1919, Faulkner was the son of Arthur Lees Faulkner and Gladys Ursula Faulkner (née Hammond), and the great-grandson of settler John Lees Faulkner. Eric Faulkner was educated at Tauranga District High School, and served as a warrant officer class 1 for three years during World War II with the 2nd New Zealand Expeditionary Force 6th Reserve Military Transport Company in North Africa and Italy.

In 1947, Faulkner married Constance Winifred Crawford, and the couple went on to have four children.

== Local-body politics ==
Faulkner served as a member of the Tauranga City Council and deputy mayor from 1962 to 1977, and mayor from 1977 to 1980.

== Other activities ==
Faulkner was grocery and supermarket operator, until his retirement in 1976. He was also active in St John New Zealand, chairing the Tauranga branch for 40 years. He was appointed a Serving Brother of the Order of St John in 1968, promoted to Officer of the Order of St john in 1976, and further promoted to Commander of the Order of St John in 1983. Faulkner was also a justice of the peace.

== Death ==
Faulkner died on 30 May 1997, and he was buried at Pyes Pa Cemetery. His wife died in 2016.
