= 2024 Tauranga City Council election =

Elections in New Zealand

- 20 July 2024
- Mayoral election
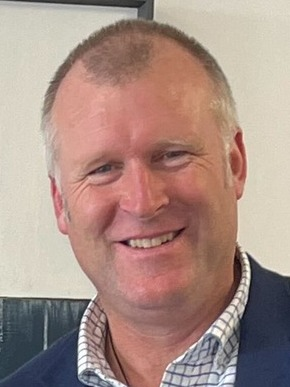

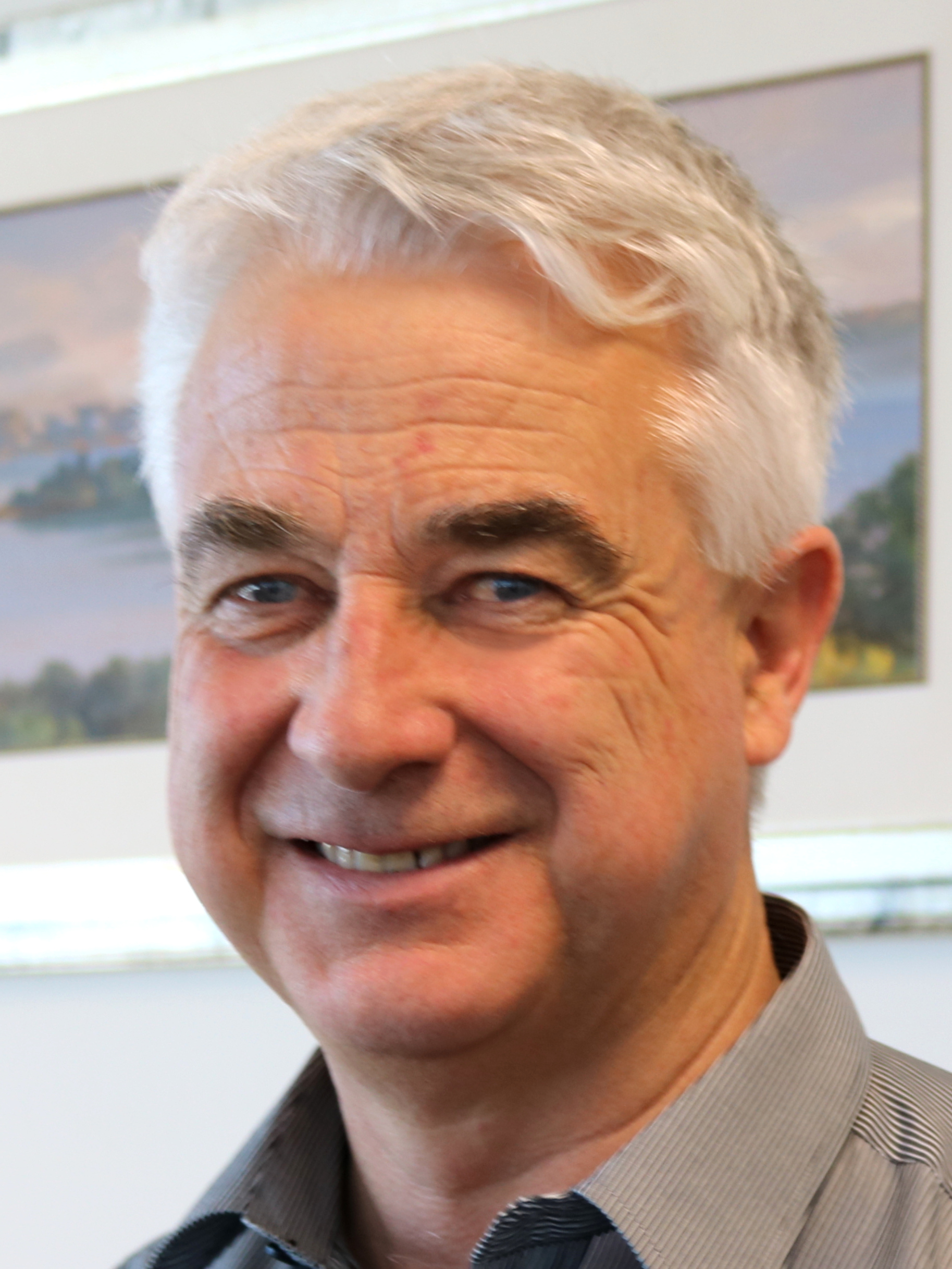

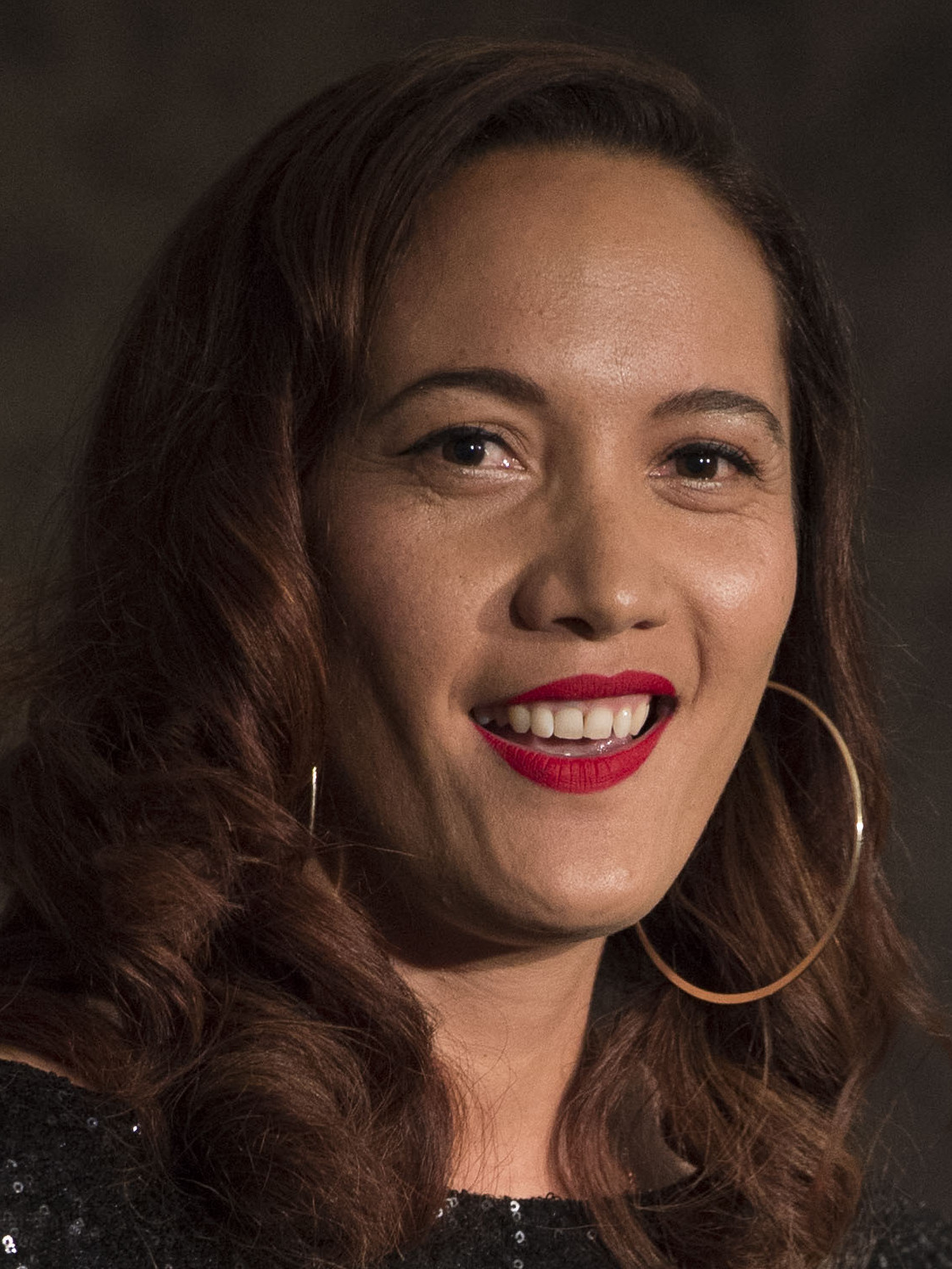

Candidate	Mahé Drysdale	Greg Brownless
Affiliation	Independent	Independent
Primary vote	10,147	5,785
Percentage	23.80%	13.57%
Final vote	16,606	10,510
Candidate	Ria Hall	Tina Salisbury
Affiliation	Independent	Independent
Primary vote	6,808	5,096
Percentage	15.97%	11.95%
Final vote	eliminated	eliminated
Mayor before election
Under commission
Elected mayor
Mahé Drysdale
Independent
- Council election
- 9 seats on the Tauranga City Council; 6 seats needed for a majority
Party	Seats	+/–
Independent	9	
This lists parties that won seats. See the complete results below.

The 2024 Tauranga City Council election was a local election held from 29 June to 20 July in Tauranga, New Zealand, following the end of the crown commission. Voters elected the mayor of Tauranga and 9 city councillors, for the unusually quadrennial 2024–2028 term of the Tauranga City Council. Postal voting and the first-past-the-post voting system was used.

== Key dates ==
Key dates relating to the election were as follows:

26 April	Nominations opened
26 April	Preliminary electoral roll opened for inspection
24 May	Nominations closed
24 May	Inspection of preliminary electoral roll closed
29 June	Voting papers sent out
29 June	Start of voting period
20 July	Final polling day
20 July	Progress result released
21 July	Preliminary result released
23 July	Final result released

== Background ==
These were the first elections for the Tauranga City Council since 2019, following the appointment by the Minister of Local Government of a Crown Commission to oversee Tauranga City Council's governance responsibilities on 9 February 2021.

The Tauranga City Council used the single transferable voting system to elect the Mayor of Tauranga and city councillors for a term that will last until the 2028 local elections.

Tauranga City Council created nine electoral wards for these elections. There were eight general wards (Mauao/Mount Maunganui, Arataki, Pāpāmoa, Welcome Bay, Matua-Otūmoetai, Bethlehem, Tauriko and Te Papa) and one Māori ward (Te Awanui, covering the entire city) which each returned one councillor.

== List of candidates ==
Nominations for candidates opened on 26 April 2024 and closed on 24 May 2024. The following 86 candidates have been confirmed to be running for the positions of mayor and the nine city councillors:

=== Mayor ===
There were 14 candidates for mayor.

=== Councillors ===
==== Te Awanui Māori ward ====
Candidate	Affiliation
Suaree Borell	Learning, Leading and Leveraging
Ashley Hillis	None
Mikaere Sydney	Tauranga Moana Kōkiritia

==== Arataki general ward ====
Candidate	Affiliation
Sarah-Jane Bourne	None
Rick Curach	Pick Rick community needs over wants
Anthony Goddard	None
Teresa Killian	None
Adrienne Pierce	None
Kim Renshaw	Voice for Arataki
Jeroen Van der Beek	A local for Arataki Ward
Andrea Webster	Independent
Harris Williams	None
Mike Williams	Common sense on Council

==== Bethlehem general ward ====
Candidate	Affiliation
Charlene Apaapa	None
Shelley Archibald	None
Felicity Auva'a	Forward with Experience Energy Action
Darren Gilchrist	None
Gerry Hodgson	None
Jos Nagels	Visionary Leadership, Not Repeatership
Bevan Rakoia	None
John Robson	Principled; Professional; Democratic
Kevin (Herb) Schuler	Constructive and Positive Leadership

==== Matua-Otūmoetai general ward ====
Candidate	Affiliation	Notes
Tanya Bamford-King	Independent	
Ronald Chamberlain	None	
Glen Crowther	Accountability, Transparency, Community	
Suzie Edmonds	Independent	
Cam Holden	Independent	
Jim McKinlay	None	
Ken Patterson	None	
Basie Pikimaui	Tauranga Moana Kōkiritia	
Tenby Powell	Our City. Our Future. Together	Mayor 2019–2020
Kim Pritchard	Independent	
Mike Rayner	For keeping our current facilities	
Zach Reeder	None	
David Tank	None	
David Webb	Tomorrow's thriving Tauranga, together	

==== Mauao/Mount Maunganui general ward ====
Candidate	Affiliation	Notes
Heidi Hughes	Community, environment, future	Councillor 2019–2020
Garth Mathieson	None	
Teresa Nichols	Independent	
Michael O'Neill	Independent	
Jacqueline Pointon	None	
Jen Scoular	Commercial acumen, community heart	
Peter Douglas Stanley	None	

==== Pāpāmoa general ward ====
Candidate	Affiliation	Notes
Bryan Archer	None	
John Bowden	None	
Phillip Coleman	None	
Ria Hall	None	
Tim Maltby	Our Rates are too High	
Steve Morris	Championing Pāpāmoa on Council	Former councillor
Maaka Nelson	None	
Craig Purcell	Pāpāmoa Pāpāmoa Proud	
Shelley Robb	Independent	

==== Tauriko general ward ====
Candidate	Affiliation	Notes
Larry Baldock	Let's Keep Moving Forward	Former deputy mayor
Murray Guy	Democracy for Tauranga	
Marten Rozeboom	None	
Stephen Wheeler	None	

==== Te Papa general ward ====
Candidate	Affiliation
Andrew Caie	Independent
Mark Decke	None
Chudleigh Haggett	None
Reihana Marx	None
Terry Molloy	None
Jim Smith	Loyal and Local
Rod Taylor	Tauranga True
Barbara Turley	None
Abraham (Bram) van Berkel	None

==== Welcome Bay general ward ====
Candidate	Affiliation
Hautapu Baker	Healthy Environment Thriving Community
Aureliu Braguta	None
Ethan Brinkman	Ethan for Reason
Robert Coe	Independent
Donna Hannah	None
Cameron Templer	Action over Words

== Results ==
The official results of the election were released on 25 July. Voter turnout was 38.77%, which compares with a turnout of 40.28% at the 2019 election. Only one woman, Jen Scoular for the Mauao/Mount Maunganui ward, was elected to the council. Two former councillors, Steve Morris and Rick Curach, were re-elected.

Mikaere Sydney was elected as councillor for Tauranga's first Māori ward Te Awanui, which the Tauranga commission had confirmed at a meeting in April 2021 following the passage of the Local Electoral (Māori Wards and Māori Constituencies) Amendment Act 2021. Te Awanui is at risk of dissolution due to the National-led coalition government requiring local councils to hold binding referendums on Māori wards.

=== Summary ===
Winning candidate	Position	Ward
Mahé Drysdale	Mayor	At-large
Jen Scoular	Councillor	Mauao/Mount Maunganui
Glen Crowther	Councillor	Matua-Otūmoetai
Rod Taylor	Councillor	Te Papa
Kevin "Herb" Schuler	Councillor	Bethlehem
Marten Rozeboom	Councillor	Tauriko
Hautapu Baker	Councillor	Welcome Bay
Rick Curach	Councillor	Arataki
Steve Morris	Councillor	Pāpāmoa
Mikaere Sydney	Councillor	Te Awanui

=== Mayor ===
Mahé Drysdale was elected, defeating Greg Brownless after 14 iterations. Ria Hall came second on the primary vote but was eliminated in the 13th iteration. Tina Salisbury was the only other candidate to get over 10% of the primary vote.

=== Mauao/Mount Maunganui general ward ===
Mauao/Mount Maunganui general ward
Affiliation	Candidate	Primary vote	%	Final vote (Note: Rounded to whole number.)
Independent	Jen Scoular	1,757		2,025
Independent	Heidi Hughes	863		1,022
Independent	Garth Mathieson	745		950
Independent	Michael O'Neill	192		
Independent	Jacqueline Pointon	191		
Independent	Peter Douglas Stanley	192		
Independent	Teresa Nichols	97		
Valid		4,351		
Informal		37		
Blank		81		
Total		4,469		
Registered		10,933		
Independent win				

=== Matua-Otūmoetai general ward ===
Matua-Otūmoetai general ward
Affiliation	Candidate	Primary vote	%	Final vote
Independent	Glen Crowther	1,582		2,523
Independent	Tenby Powell	1,385		1,975
Independent	Cam Holden	808		
Independent	David Matthew Webb	686		
Independent	Suzie Edmonds	306		
Independent	Ken Patterson	274		
Independent	Tanya Bamford-King	262		
Independent	Mike Rayner	241		
Independent	Jim McKinlay	120		
Independent	Kim Pritchard	80		
Independent	Zach Reeder	74		
Independent	Basie Pikimaui	48		
Independent	Ronald Chamberlain	46		
Independent	David Tank	38		
Valid		5,950		
Informal		35		
Blank		72		
Total		6,057		
Registered		13,219		
Independent win				

=== Te Papa general ward ===
Te Papa general ward
Affiliation	Candidate	Primary vote	%	Final vote
Independent	Rod Taylor	726		1,287
Independent	Andrew Caie	765		1,182
Independent	Terry Molloy	465		
Independent	Barbara Turley	404		
Independent	Jim Smith	365		
Independent	Mark Decke	323		
Independent	Reihana Marx	205		
Independent	Chudleigh Haggett	181		
Independent	Abraham van Berkel	169		
Valid		3,603		
Informal		45		
Blank		123		
Total		3,771		
Registered		11,132		
Independent win				

=== Bethlehem general ward ===
Bethlehem general ward
Affiliation	Candidate	Primary vote	%	Final vote
Independent	Kevin "Herb" Schuler	1,544		2,349
Independent	Darren Gilchrist	1,042		1,763
Independent	John Robson	1,033		
Independent	Felicity Jane Auva'a	459		
Independent	Shelley Archibald	436		
Independent	Charlene Apaapa	332		
Independent	Jos Nagels	280		
Independent	Bevan Rakoia	248		
Independent	Gerry Hodgson	157		
Valid		5,531		
Informal		29		
Blank		136		
Total		5,696		
Registered		12,923		
Independent win				

=== Tauriko general ward ===
Tauriko general ward
Affiliation	Candidate	Primary vote	%	Final vote
Independent	Marten Rozeboom	1,885		2,182
Independent	Larry Baldock	1,060		1,133
Independent	Murray Guy	724		800
Independent	Stephen Wheeler	636		
Valid		4,305		
Informal		56		
Blank		183		
Total		4,544		
Registered		12,071		
Independent win				

=== Welcome Bay general ward ===
Welcome Bay general ward
Affiliation	Candidate	Primary vote	%	Final vote
Independent	Hautapu Baker	2,125		2,559
Independent	Cameron Templer	1,457		1,909
Independent	Aureliu Braguta	801		
Independent	Robert Coe	390		
Independent	Ethan Brinkman	226		
Independent	Donna Hannah	187		
Valid		5,073		
Informal		40		
Blank		146		
Total		5,259		
Registered		13,421		
Independent win				

=== Arataki general ward ===
Arataki general ward
Affiliation	Candidate	Primary vote	%	Final vote
Independent	Rick Curach	1,200		1,894
Independent	Kim Renshaw	794		1,724
Independent	Harris Williams	615		
Independent	Mike Williams	552		
Independent	Jeroen van der Beek	418		
Independent	Anthony Goddard	359		
Independent	Andrea Webster	316		
Independent	Teresa Killian	202		
Independent	Sarah-Jane Bourne	157		
Valid		5,224		
Informal		49		
Blank		69		
Total		5,342		
Registered		13,006		
Independent win				

=== Pāpāmoa general ward ===
Pāpāmoa general ward
Affiliation	Candidate	Primary vote	%	Final vote
Independent	Steve Morris	1,273		1,818
Independent	Tim Maltby	1,122		1,616
Independent	Ria Hall	838		
Independent	Maaka Nelson	591		
Independent	Bryan Archer	386		
Independent	Phil Coleman	272		
Independent	Shelley Robb	109		
Independent	John Bowden	96		
Valid		4,687		
Informal		26		
Blank		69		
Total		4,782		
Registered		13,735		
Independent win				

=== Te Awanui Māori ward ===
Te Awanui Māori ward
Affiliation	Candidate	Primary vote	%
Independent	Mikaere Sydney	1,515	
Independent	Suaree Borell	754	
Independent	Ashley Hillis	207	
Valid		2,476	
Informal		82	
Blank		134	
Total		2,692	
Registered		8,941	
Independent win			
