= 2016 Tauranga mayoral election =

Mayoral Election in 2016

- 8 October 2016
- Turnout: 68,364
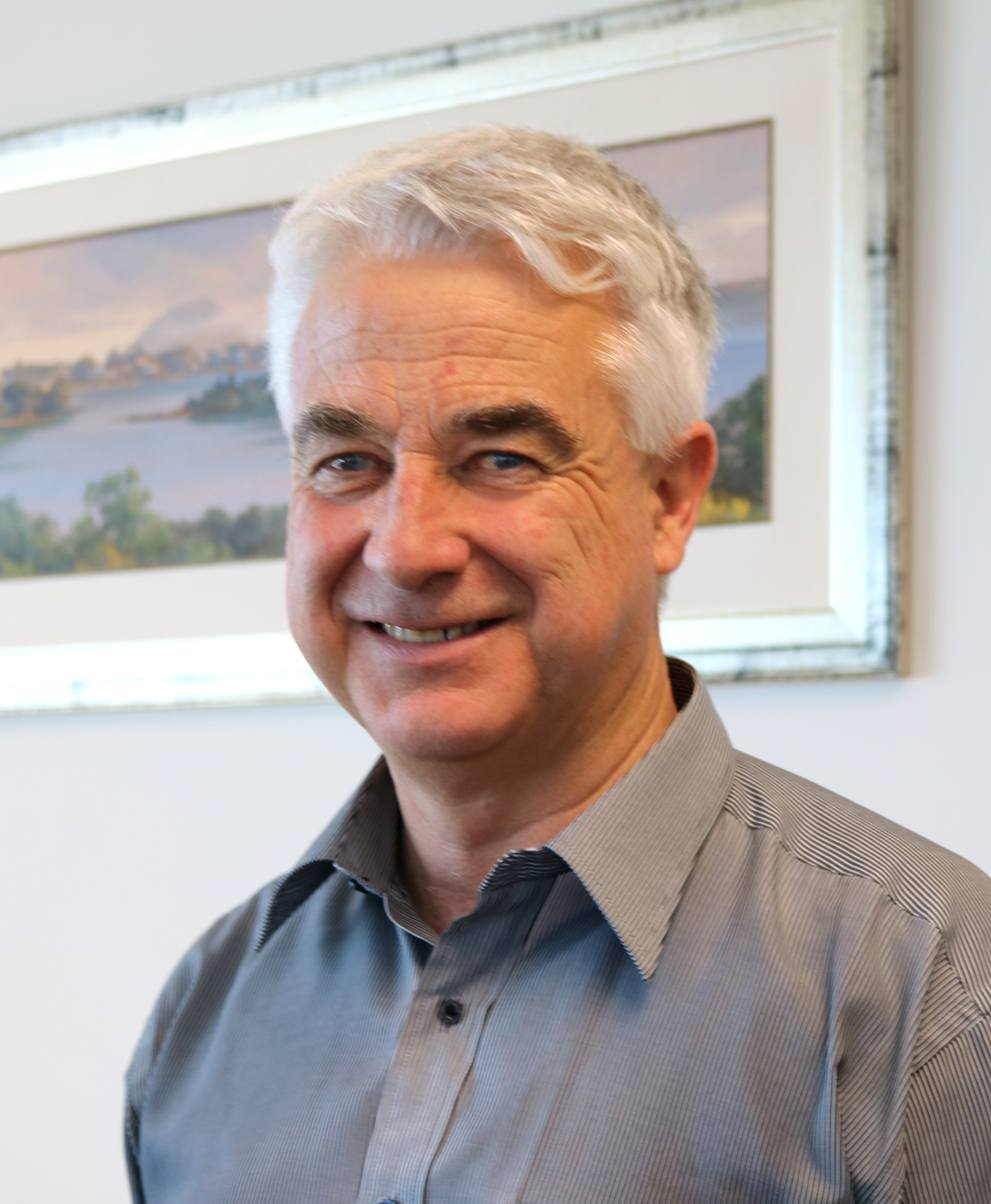

Candidate	Greg Brownless	Kelvin Clout
Party	Independent	Independent
Popular vote	9,110	7,128
Percentage	26.65	20.85
Candidate	Max Mason	Doug Owens
Party	Independent	Independent
Popular vote	4,040	3,991
Percentage	11.82	11.67
Mayor before election
Stuart Crosby
Elected mayor
Greg Brownless

The 2016 Tauranga mayoral election was held on 8 October 2016 as part of the New Zealand local elections to elect the Mayor of Tauranga.

Incumbent mayor Stuart Crosby announced in 2014 that he would not seek re-election.

== Results ==
The following table gives the election results:

2016 Tauranga mayoral election
Party	Candidate	Votes	%	±%
Independent	Greg Brownless	9,110	26.65	
Independent	Kelvin Clout	7,128	20.85	−11.37
Independent	Max Mason	4,040	11.82	
Independent	Doug Owens	3,991	11.67	
Independent	Steve Morris	3,019	8.83	
Independent	Murray Guy	1,764	5.16	
Independent	Larry Baldock	1,654	4.83	
Independent	John Robson	1,478	4.32	−6.28
Independent	Graeme Purches	995	2.91	
Independent	Noel James Peterson	452	1.32	
Independent	Hori BOP Leaming	406	1.18	−8.15
Informal votes		145	0.42	+0.16
Majority		1,982	5.8	
Turnout		68,364		
