= Crown commission administration of Tauranga =

New Zealand government commission for Tauranga, Bay of Plenty

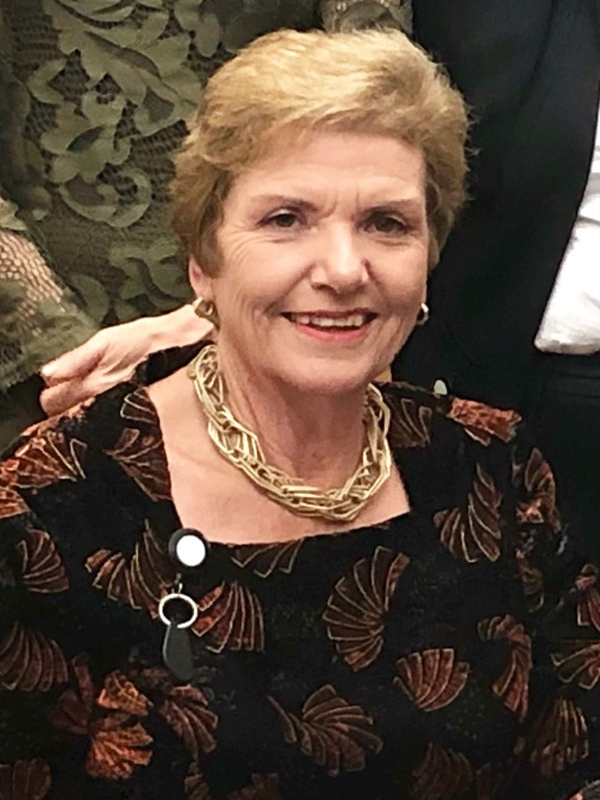
Anne Tolley was the commission chair from 2021 to 2024.

The Crown commission of Tauranga, officially known as the Commission to the Tauranga City Council, was the administrative body of the Tauranga City Council between February 2021 and July 2024.

On 9 February 2021, the New Zealand Government suspended the elected members of the Tauranga City Council, the largest city in the Bay of Plenty Region, and appointed a government commission of four administrators to the territorial authority instead. Anne Tolley was the chair of the commission. The suspension was to last until October 2022, in time for the 2022 New Zealand local elections, but was later extended to July 2024. The voters of Tauranga were thus having a local election outside of the normal three-yearly cycle and because the next New Zealand local elections are to be held just fourteen months later, the electoral term for the incoming council was set at four years.

== Background ==
On 20 November 2020, Mayor of Tauranga Tenby Powell resigned following infighting between himself and city councillors. The resignation came eight months after the mayor was unanimously censured by his council for an angry outburst. Following further mayoral "outbursts", Powell publicly called for the Minister of Local Government to appoint a commission to replace the "dysfunctional" council.

On 18 December 2020, Minister of Local Government Nanaia Mahuta confirmed that the government would be appointing commissioners to administrate Tauranga in response to infighting within the city council. The commissioners' terms began in early 2021 and were scheduled to last until the next local elections scheduled for October 2022. The decision to cancel the election for a new mayor and councillors, and the appointment of a crown commission instead by Nanaia Mahuta was not without controversy. A review by law firm Russell McVeagh found the minister's decision may have been "unlawful" because she failed to adequately consider lesser alternatives, such as the appointment of a crown manager. Then Tauranga MP, Simon Bridges, called the decision "dramatic and draconian" while saying that Powell quitting removed "a significant source of friction" and it was reasonable to assume the council would become more functional with the election of a new mayor and councillor.

=== Commission reappointment controversy ===
Contrary to Minister Mahuta's assurance that local democracy would be restored at the next local elections in October 2022, she later decided that the Tauranga City Council would continue to be administered by four commissioners until July 2024. In her announcement she cited "substantial infrastructure challenges" in Tauranga and the surrounding Bay of Plenty region. However, a legal opinion by Linda Clark from Dentons Kensington Swan argued that relying on infrastructure challenges as a reason to postpone elections "sets the bar very low and would apply to a wide range of local authorities on an indefinite basis."

On 22 April 2022, Mahuta confirmed that the commission's chairwoman, Anne Tolley, and fellow commissioners Bill Wasley, Stephen Selwood, and Shadrach Rolleston had been reappointed as commissioners with elections postponed until July 2024.

While Tauranga City Council chief executive Marty Grenfell and Bay of Plenty Regional Council chairman Doug Leeder welcomed the reappointments on the ground that they ensured continuity, Tauranga Ratepayers' Alliance spokesman Michael O'Neill and former Tauranga mayor Greg Brownless criticised the extension of the commissioners' terms and called for a return of local democracy. Local Government New Zealand president and Bay of Plenty regional councillor Stuart Crosby labelled the extension of the commission's appointment "disgusting" while then Tauranga MP, Simon Bridges, cited “power, convenience and control” as the reasons behind Mahuta's decision, and questioned a lack of achievement since the four-person commission was put in place by Labour in February 2021. Victoria University of Wellington public law expert, Dean Knight, said democracy had taken a hit and "should have been restored forthwith."

=== Legal arguments against reappointment ===
The Dentons advice argued that Mahuta's decision was both unlawful and unreasonable; not meeting the statutory test for crown intervention under the Local Government Act 2002. They outlined several reasons why the suspension of democracy for a second time were challengeable:

- The Minister failed to take proper account of the purpose of the Local Government Act
- The Minister failed to identify problems that were unique to Tauranga that warranted the reappointment of a commission
- The Minister failed to undertake a proper risk assessment, and the one provided to her by the commissioners was "highly speculative"
- The Minister failed to provide sufficient evidence or provide reasonable grounds to reappoint the commission
- The Minister failed to have regard to the mandatory relevant considerations in Part 10 of the Local Government Act.

=== Public criticism of the commission ===
The commission's appointment was met with a protest. It faced criticism over its handling of CBD projects and a three-year series of roadworks on Cameron Road that forced businesses to permanently close. The chair of the commission admitted that the council "didn’t get it right” and the council and community have since been left “scarred” by failings in the Cameron Rd works. The chair of the commission was awarded the 2021 Local Government Waste Award by the Taxpayers' Union as "under her watch the city has seen record rate hikes, council salary bloat, and infrastructure botch-ups."

The commission faced criticism of its financial stewardship of the city with "spiralling debt", "underfunding transport infrastructure" and raising rates to "the highest of any NZ city." The commission was accused by ratepayer organisations of putting non-essential infrastructure such as a library, museum, performing arts centre and swimming complex ahead of essential transport infrastructure. The council's own residents' survey conducted between November and December 2023 found just 16% of residents were satisfied with Council's financial management under the commissioners.

A Curia poll in April 2023 showed that 67% of Tauranga residents wanted the commissioners dismissed and a local election to be held at the same time as the 2023 New Zealand general election with only 26% wanting them to remain. Despite being tasked to "maintain the trust of the community in council," Council's aforementioned residents' survey showed just 26% of residents were satisfied with the council under commissioners; down from 66% satisfaction with the democratically elected council in 2019. Under commissioners, only 22% of the residents surveyed were satisfied with the council's leadership and just 21% found the council trustworthy. Tauranga's commissioners scored the lowest approval rating (−18%) among the leadership of 37 councils in 2024.

=== Commission's attempt to remain in power ===
In December 2023, the commission wrote to the new Minister of Local Government, Simeon Brown and asked for a law change so that they could remain until at least 2025 and possibly 2028 with the commission chair acting as in the place of mayor until 2025. The request was only revealed in public in April 2024 after an official information request. The Minister rejected their request to remain and said that Tauranga would return to full democracy in July 2024. Locally based ACT MP, Cameron Luxton criticised the attempt, saying "It's a lesson in the fragility of democracy – give someone an inch of power without accountability, and they'll try to take a mile."

== Commissioners ==
The crown commissioners appointed to replace the mayor and councillors of the Tauranga City Council on 9 February 2021 were:

| Position | Member |
|---|---|
| Commission chair | Anne Tolley |
| Commissioner | Bill Wasley |
| Commissioner | Stephen Selwood |
| Commissioner | Shadrach Rolleston |
