= Anne Tolley =

New Zealand politician

The Honourable Anne Tolley JP
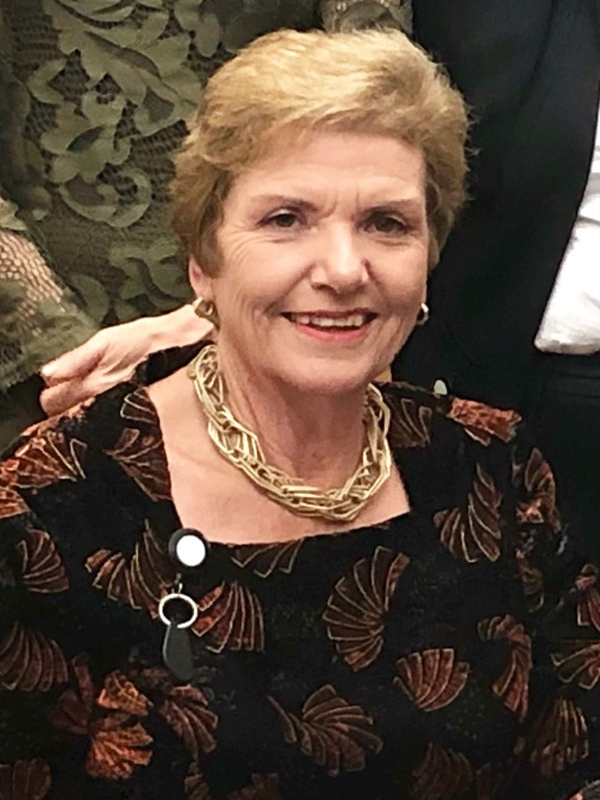
- Tolley in 2019

Commission Chair of the Tauranga City Council
- In office 9 February 2021 – 2 August 2024
- Preceded by: Tenby Powell (as Mayor)
- Succeeded by: Mahe Drysdale (as Mayor)

Deputy Speaker of the New Zealand House of Representatives
- In office 8 November 2017 – 17 October 2020
- Preceded by: Chester Borrows
- Succeeded by: Adrian Rurawhe

26th Minister of Social Development
- In office 13 October 2014 – 26 October 2017
- Prime Minister: John Key; Bill English
- Preceded by: Paula Bennett
- Succeeded by: Carmel Sepuloni

44th Minister of Education
- In office 19 November 2008 – 25 November 2011
- Prime Minister: John Key
- Preceded by: Chris Carter
- Succeeded by: Hekia Parata

Minister for Tertiary Education
- In office 19 November 2008 – 27 January 2010
- Prime Minister: John Key
- Preceded by: Pete Hodgson
- Succeeded by: Steven Joyce

Member of the New Zealand Parliament for East Coast
- In office 17 September 2005 – 17 October 2020
- Preceded by: Janet Mackey
- Succeeded by: Kiri Allan
- Majority: 6,413

Member of the New Zealand Parliament for National Party list
- In office 27 November 1999 – 27 July 2002

Personal details
- Born: Anne Merrilyn Hicks; 1 March 1953 (age 73) Wellington, New Zealand
- Party: National Party
- Spouse: Allan Hunt Tolley (m. 1973)
- Children: Three
- Occupation: Hotelier, Local Government
- Website: annetolley.co.nz

Anne Merrilyn Tolley JP (née Hicks; born 1 March 1953) is a New Zealand politician.

Tolley was elected as a member of the Napier City Council in 1986 and served as deputy mayor from 1989 until 1995. In 1999 she was elected to Parliament as a list MP representing the National Party. She was unseated in 2002 but returned in 2005 as the new East Coast MP. Between 2008 and 2017 she was a senior minister in the Fifth National Government, holding the offices of Minister of Education, Minister of Social Development, Minister of Corrections, Minister of Police and Minister of Local Government. She established Oranga Tamariki and was the first Minister for Children from 2016 to 2017.

She was Deputy Speaker of the House of Representatives from 2017 to 2020. In 2021 she was appointed chair of the commission overseeing the Tauranga City Council.

== Early life and family ==
Tolley was born in Wellington on 1 March 1953, the daughter of Mary Margaret Hicks (née Norris) and her husband Ronald James Hicks. She was educated at Colenso High School (now William Colenso College) in Napier, and spent time as a Rotary exchange student in Allentown, Pennsylvania, United States. She went on to gain a diploma in computer programming. In 1973 she married Allan Hunt Tolley, and the couple had three children. With her husband, Tolley ran a boutique hotel in Napier.

== Local government ==
In 1986 Tolley was elected as a member of the Napier City Council and remained in that role until 1995. She served as deputy mayor of Napier between 1989 and 1995, and was an elected member of the Hawke's Bay Regional Council from 1989 to 1992. She has been a Justice of the Peace since 1989.

While on Napier City Council, Tolley was involved in the establishment of a local-authority trading enterprise to run Marineland and the Napier Aquarium, the Emerson Street redevelopment project, and the redevelopment of McLean Park. She sought re-election in the 1995 local elections, but was defeated.

== Member of Parliament ==
New Zealand Parliament
Years	Term	Electorate	List	Party
1999–2002	46th	List	20	National
2005–2008	48th	East Coast	43	National
2008–2011	49th	East Coast	10	National
2011–2014	50th	East Coast	8	National
2014–2017	51st	East Coast	12	National
2017–2020	52nd	East Coast	11	National

An independent on the Napier City Council, Tolley was encouraged to join the Labour Party by incumbent Napier MP Geoff Braybrooke but declined, instead joining the National Party. She was interested in being a candidate for National at the 1996 general election, but had not been a member of the party for long enough. She challenged Braybrooke for the Napier seat in 1999. While unsuccessful in that contest, Tolley was elected as a list MP.

In her first term, Tolley sat on the governance and administration committee and served as the National Party spokesperson for early childhood education and women's affairs. In 2000, her members bill—the Films, Videos, and Publications Classification (Prohibition of Child Pornography) Amendment Bill—was introduced. The bill responded to, and sought to overturn, the Court of Appeal's decision on Moonen v Film and Literature Board of Review, which had found that the right to freedom of expression in the New Zealand Bill of Rights Act 1990 held even in the Film and Literature Board of Review's consideration of photographs depicting children in sexualised poses. The bill was eventually voted down because the government did not consider Moonen to sanction child pornography. Issues around censorship were progressed soon after through an inquiry into the Films, Videos, and Publications Classification Act 1993 and a government amendment passed in 2005.

In the 2002 election, she unsuccessfully contested the Napier seat against Braybrooke's successor, Russell Fairbrother. Along with many other National MPs, Tolley did not escape the collapse of the party's vote that year, and so did not return to Parliament as a list MP. She did return at the 2005 general election, having won the East Coast electorate over Labour candidate Moana Mackey, daughter of the previous East Coast MP Janet Mackey. She held the electorate at the four subsequent elections.

She served as the first woman National Party whip from December 2006 until February 2008 when she became the party's education spokesperson. When National won the 2008 general election, she became the first woman Minister of Education. She continued in senior roles in the Fifth National Government until its defeat in 2017 and thereafter became Deputy Speaker. In that role, she chaired a cross-party steering group steering group to develop a parliamentary code of conduct, as an outcome of an independent review into bullying and harassment in the parliamentary workplace. This occurred after interrupting Youth MP Lily Dorrance's speech at the 2022 Youth Parliament, leaving Dorrance "humiliated", which Tolley said made her "all the more aware of the issues".

At the end of 2019, Tolley declared her intention to run as a list-only candidate in the 2020 general election in hope of being able to be appointed Speaker of the House if National were able to form a government. She was succeeded as National's candidate for the East Coast electorate by Rotorua District Councillor Tania Tapsell. However, in June 2020, with National polling poorly, Tolley announced that she would instead retire at the 2020 election. She gave her valedictory statement on 23 July 2020.

== Minister in the Fifth National Government ==
=== Minister of Education: 2008–2011 ===
The National Party formed a government after the 2008 general election and Tolley was appointed Minister of Education, the first woman to hold that position. The key policy introduced during her term was introduction of the National Standards programme that measured children's progress against the curriculum in reading, writing and mathematics, in order to increase schools' accountability. The programme was opposed by many teachers and school principals, some of whom refused to implement the standards. In January 2010, Tolley's responsibilities for tertiary education were reassigned to Steven Joyce, with Prime Minister John Key stating that this would allow Tolley to focus on the implementation of national standards.

In June 2010, Tolley expressed concerns about a Parliamentary Library research paper that was critical of National Standards, calling it "unprofessional", "highly political" and so biased it could have been written by the union opposing the policy. Such papers are required by the Parliamentary Library to be politically neutral. A month later the New Zealand Principals Federation voted to support regional associations which boycotted training for National Standards. Tolley reminded principals that in her view it would be quicker and give better results to contact herself or the Ministry of Education with concerns about the changes, than to speak through the media.

The stand-off between Tolley and teachers was embarrassing for the Government and resulted in Cabinet changes after National was re-elected in November 2011. Hekia Parata was made Education Minister while Tolley was demoted in the Cabinet rankings, becoming Minister of Corrections and Police, succeeding Judith Collins who was promoted to Minister of Justice.

=== Minister of Police and Minister of Corrections: 2011–2014 ===
In March 2012, one of her first major announcements as the Minister of Corrections was the proposed closure of the old prisons in Wellington and New Plymouth. She also said that a number of older units at Arohata, Rolleston, Rangipo and Waikeria prisons would close. Later that year, the Government awarded a 25-year contract to Serco to build a 960-bed prison at Wiri, South Auckland, at a cost of NZ$900 million. Tolley attended a sod-turning ceremony at the site of the new prison Wiri in September 2012.

In June 2012, Tolley as Police Minister was responsible for crushing the first "boy racer" car under the Vehicle Confiscation and Seizure Act.

=== Minister of Social Development and Minister for Children: 2014–2017 ===
When National was returned to government after the 2014 general election, Tolley succeeded Paula Bennett as Minister of Social Development. A key achievement during this term was reforming the Child, Youth and Family service within the Ministry of Social Development into a standalone agency, Oranga Tamariki, the Ministry for Children, after a Children's Commissioner report in 2015 found that the government had failed children in state care.

From September to December 2016, Tolley had an additional appointment as Minister for Youth. On 20 December 2016 she became the Minister for Children and the Minister of Local Government and held these roles, along with Minister of Social Development, until the Government was defeated at the 2017 general election.

Along with former state services minister Paula Bennett, Tolley was accused by New Zealand First party leader Winston Peters in 2017 of leaking information about his incorrectly filed superannuation application. Tolley admitted having told her sister of the situation before it was reported by media, but was not found to have alerted media.

== Tauranga City Council ==
On 9 February 2021, the Minister of Local Government appointed a Crown Commission to oversee all of Tauranga City Council's governance responsibilities (with all existing elected members being discharged). Tolley was appointed commission chair.

== Health ==
It emerged in 2010 that Tolley had undergone gastric bypass (stomach stapling) surgery in order to lose weight. Tolley joins other current and former New Zealand politicians including Rahui Katene, David Lange, Chester Borrows, Donna Awatere-Huata and Tariana Turia to have had gastric bypass surgery at some point in the past.

New Zealand Parliament
Preceded by Janet Mackey	Member of Parliament for East Coast; 2005–2020	Succeeded by Kiri Allan
Political offices
Preceded by Chris Carter	Minister of Education; 2008–2011	Succeeded by Hekia Parata
Preceded by Judith Collins	Minister of Corrections; 2011–2014	Succeeded by Sam Lotu-Iiga
Preceded by Judith Collins	Minister of Police; 2011–2014	Succeeded by Michael Woodhouse
Preceded by Paula Bennett	Minister for Social Development; 2014–2017	Succeeded by Carmel Sepuloni
