= Tauranga City =

Tauranga City may refer to:

- Tauranga City (district), the area covered by Tauranga City Council
- Tauranga, a city in the North Island of New Zealand
- Tauranga City AFC, a former football team from Tauranga, now merged as part of Tauranga City United
