= Stuart Crosby =

New Zealand politician

Stuart Crosby ONZM
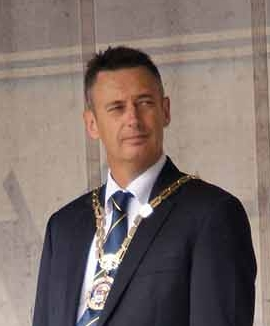

28th Mayor of Tauranga
- In office 9 October 2004 – 8 October 2016
- Deputy: David Stewart
- Preceded by: Jan Beange
- Succeeded by: Greg Brownless
- Majority: 7,392 (21.86%)

Personal details
- Born: Stuart Alan Crosby; 1956 (age 69–70)

Stuart Alan Crosby ONZM (born 1956) is a New Zealand politician who served as mayor of the city of Tauranga from 2004 to 2016.

== Early life ==
Crosby was born in 1956. His family moved from Gisborne to Papamoa in 1966, where they started the Papamoa Beach Resort Holiday Park. After finishing high school, Crosby took up an apprenticeship with the Tauranga Electric Power Board, which later became Trustpower. He travelled and worked overseas from 1978 to 1981; after returning to Tauranga he owned Papamoa Electrical Services and Accolade Homes.

== Political career ==
Crosby stood for and was elected to the Papamoa Community Council, which was part of the Tauranga Borough Council, in 1986. Crosby was 30 at the time, which was considered young for a councillor. The 1989 local government reforms saw a merger of local authorities, resulting in the establishment of the Tauranga District Council (renamed Tauranga City Council in 2003). Crosby was elected to Tauranga District Council in 1989 and was re-elected every three years thereafter.

Crosby was deputy mayor to Noel Pope from 1998 to 2001. After Pope's retirement, Crosby sought the mayoralty but was defeated at the 2001 local elections by Jan Beange. In 2004, Crosby defeated Beange and began what would become a twelve-year period as mayor.

Crosby did not recontest the mayoralty in 2016. Instead, he successfully sought election to the Bay of Plenty Regional Council, representing the Tauranga constituency. In 2019, he was re-elected unopposed.

In August 2020, Crosby was elected as the president of Local Government New Zealand, the national association of councils in New Zealand, succeeding former Dunedin mayor Dave Cull. Crosby had previously served as Cull's vice-president.

== Honours and awards ==
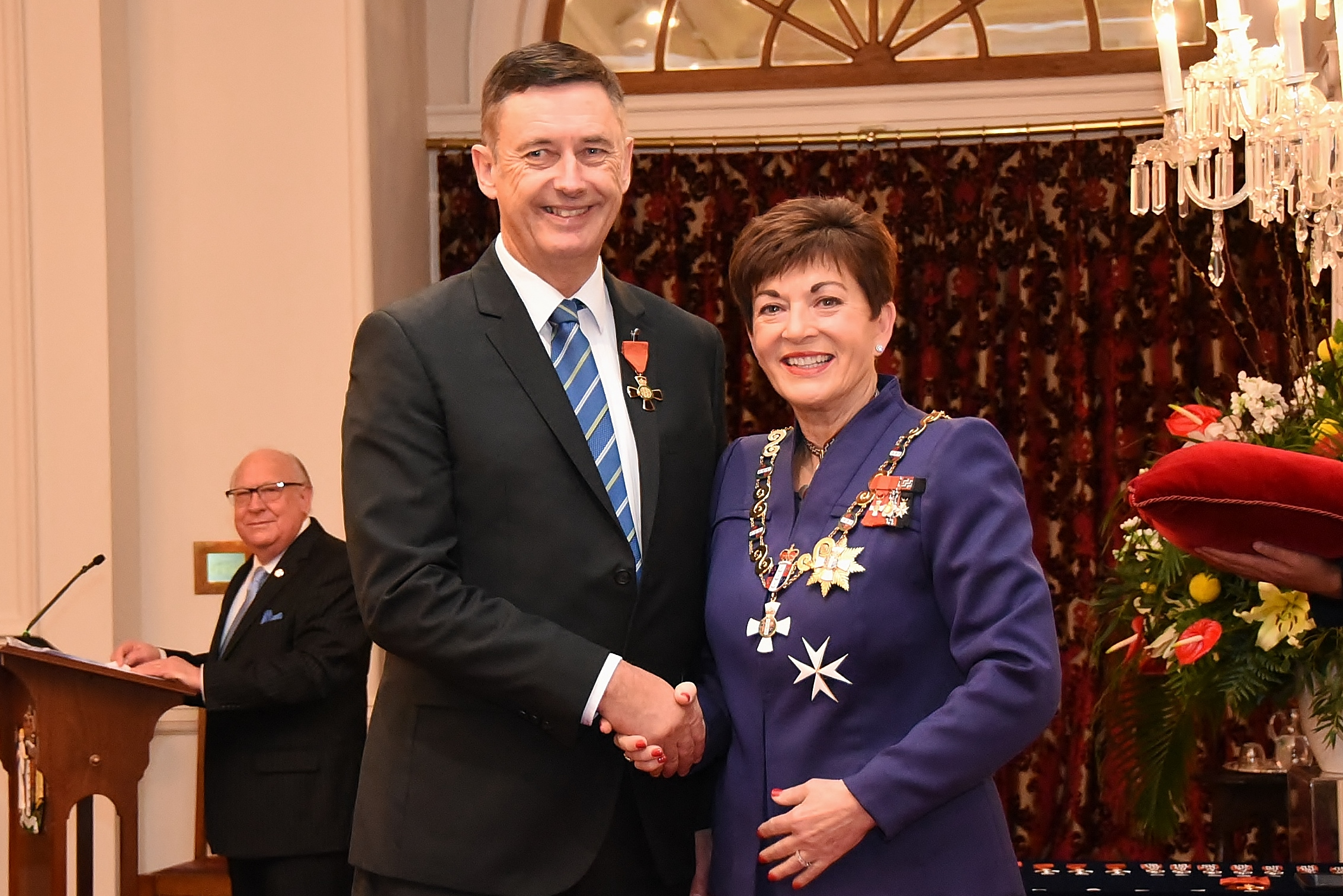
Crosby (left), after his investiture as an Officer of the New Zealand Order of Merit by the governor-general, Dame Patsy Reddy, at Government House, Wellington, on 31 August 2017

In the 2017 New Year Honours, Crosby was appointed an Officer of the New Zealand Order of Merit, for services to local government.

Political offices
Preceded by Jan Beange	Mayor of Tauranga; 2004–2016	Succeeded by Greg Brownless
