= Bradshaw Dive =

New Zealand politician

New Zealand Parliament
Years	Term	Electorate	Party
1908–1909	17th	Egmont	Independent
1909–1911	Changed allegiance to:		Reform

Bradshaw Dive (2 August 1865 – 17 April 1946) was a Reform Party Member of Parliament in New Zealand.

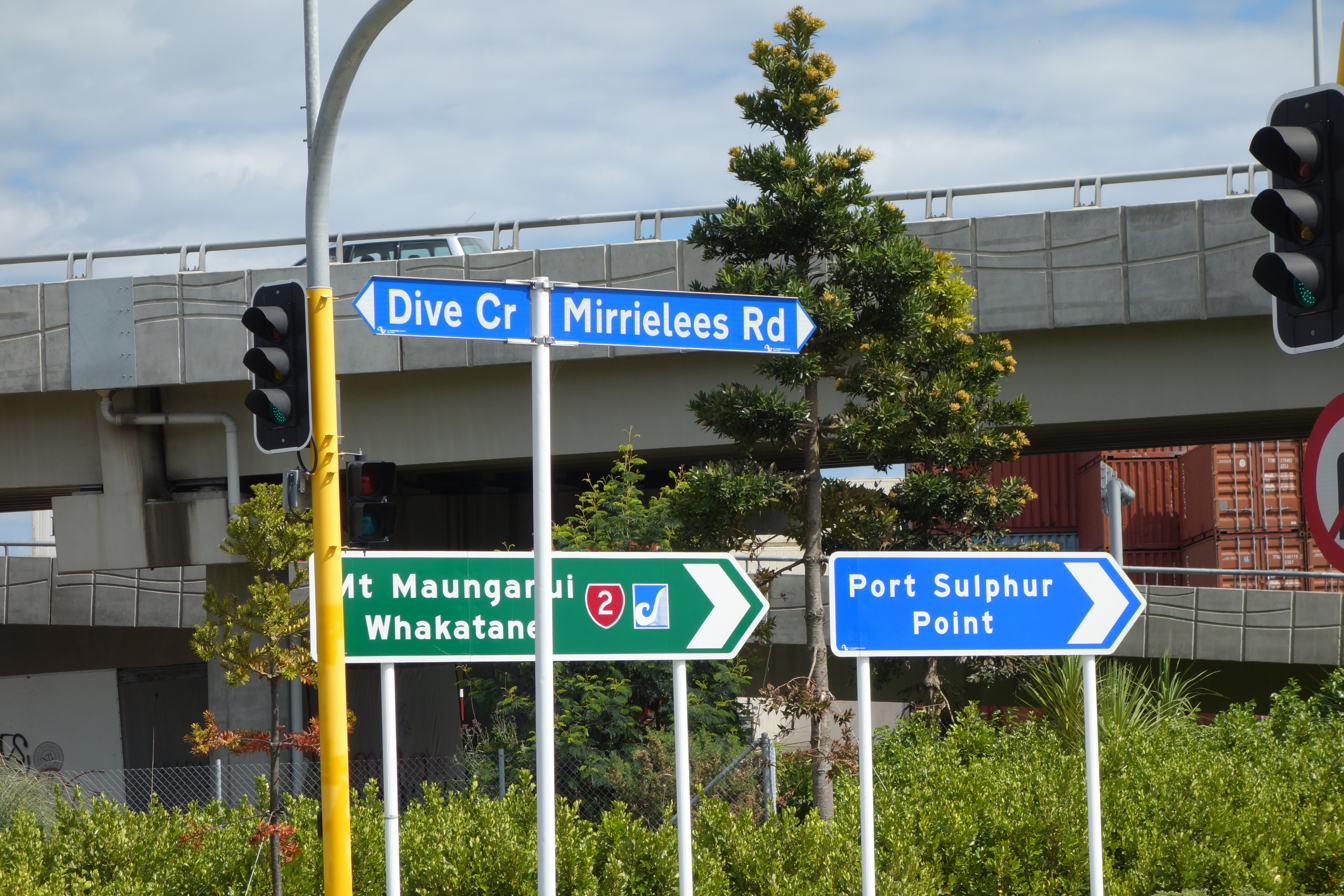
Dive Crescent in Tauranga is named after the former Mayor of Tauranga

He was elected to the Egmont electorate in the 1908 general election, but was defeated in 1911. He later served as Mayor of Tauranga.

== Notes ==
New Zealand Parliament
Preceded by William Jennings	Member of Parliament for Egmont; 1908–1911	Succeeded by Thomas Mackenzie
Political offices
Preceded by John Cuthbert Adams	Mayor of Tauranga; 1919–1929	Succeeded by Benjamin Conrad "Cockie" Robbins
