= Bob Owens (businessman) =

New Zealand businessman and mayor

Sir Bob Owens KNZM CBE

22rd Mayor of Tauranga
- In office 29 October 1968 – 25 October 1977
- Preceded by: David Mitchell
- Succeeded by: Eric Faulkner

Mayor of Mount Maunganui
- In office 1971–1974
- Preceded by: Arthur Harris
- Succeeded by: Kelvin O'Hara

Personal details
- Born: Eric Lees Faulkner; 26 August 1921 Manchester, Lancashire, England
- Died: 5 September 1999 (aged 78)
- Spouse(s): Constance Joy Walker (m. 1950, divorced) Ximena Owens
- Children: 4
- Relatives: Mahé Drysdale (grandson); Rose Keddell (granddaughter)
- Education: Manchester Grammar School; Liverpool Technical College
- Occupation: Businessman

Sir Robert Arthur Owens KNZM CBE (26 August 1921 – 5 September 1999) was a New Zealand businessman and local politician. He served as mayor of both Tauranga and the nearby Mount Maunganui in the Bay of Plenty. He later moved from Mount Maunganui (which has the Port of Tauranga) to Auckland. He was knighted in 1997.

== Biography ==
Owens was born in Manchester and educated at Manchester Grammar School and Liverpool Technical College. He was in the British merchant service from 1937 to 1946 when he arrived in New Zealand. He was chief officer holding a Master Mariner's Certificate and on Royal Navy transport tankers in the Mediterranean from 1942 to 1944.

He started his own shipping and stevedoring business in Tauranga in 1953. The Owens Group expanded into travel and insurance, covered 38 companies, and represented the Mitsui OSK Lines in New Zealand. The Owens Group was taken over by Mainfreight in 1993.

Owens was a Tauranga city councillor from 1962 to 1968, mayor of Tauranga from 1968 to 1977, and mayor of Mount Maunganui Borough from 1971 to 1974 (when he was defeated on the issue of amalgamation with Tauranga, which he favoured). He was on the Bay of Plenty Harbour Board from 1962 to 1988, director of the Port of Tauranga in 1988 and chairman of Air New Zealand from 1981 to 1984.

== Personal life ==
Owens married Constance Joy Walker in Auckland in 1950, and they went on to have four children. Their grandchildren include rower Mahé Drysdale and field hockey player Rose Keddell. The couple later divorced and Owens married Ximena. He died in Auckland on 5 September 1999.

In the 2007 New Year Honours, Owens' first wife, Joy Owens, was appointed a Companion of the Queen's Service Order for community service. She died in 2016.

== Honours and awards ==
In 1990, Owens was awarded the New Zealand 1990 Commemoration Medal. In the 1991 Queen's Birthday Honours, he was made a Commander of the Order of the British Empire, for services to transport industry, local government and community. In the 1997 Queen's Birthday Honours, he was appointed a Knight Companion of the New Zealand Order of Merit, for services to business and the community. In 1996, Owens was inducted into the New Zealand Business Hall of Fame.

Political offices
Preceded by David Mitchell	Mayor of Tauranga; 1968–1977	Succeeded by Eric Faulkner
