= 2019 Tauranga mayoral election =

Local election in New Zealand

- 12 October 2019
- Turnout: 38,328 (40.41%)

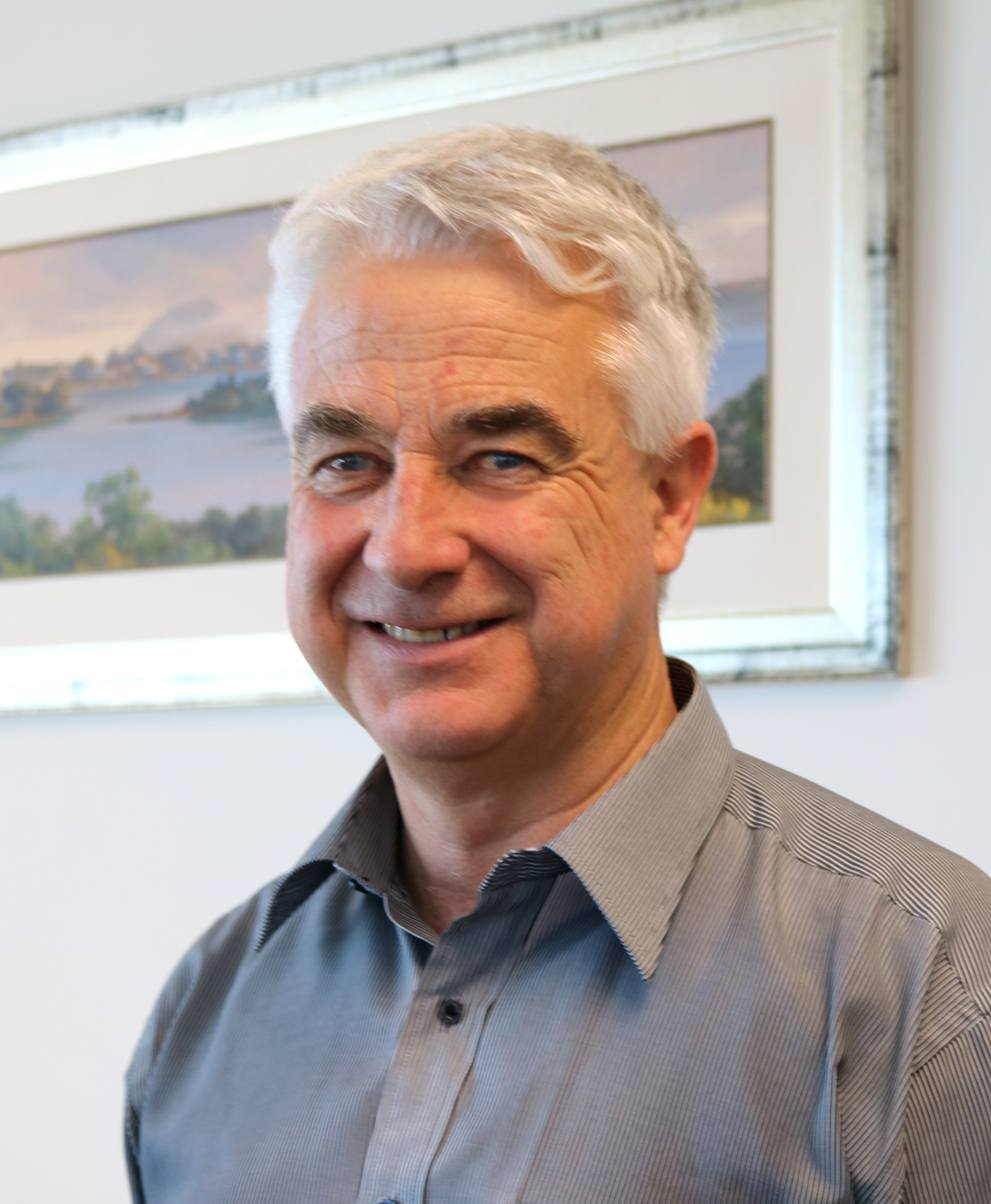
Candidate	Tenby Powell	Greg Brownless
Party	Independent	Independent
Popular vote	17,299	12,400
Percentage	58.24	41.75
Mayor before election
Greg Brownless
Elected mayor
Tenby Powell

The 2019 Tauranga mayoral election was part of the New Zealand local elections that were 12 October 2019 to elect the Mayor of Tauranga. It was won by Tenby Powell who defeated the incumbent mayor Greg Brownless.

== Key dates ==
Key dates for the election were:

- 1 July: Electoral Commission enrolment campaign started.
- 19 July: Nominations opened for candidates. Rolls opened for inspection.
- 16 August: Nominations closed at 12 noon. Rolls closed.
- 21 August: Election date and candidates' names announced.
- 20 to 25 September: Voting documents delivered to households. Electors could post the documents back to electoral officers as soon as they have voted.
- 12 October: Polling day. Voting documents needed to be at council before voting closes at 12 noon. Preliminary results were available as soon as all ordinary votes are counted.
- 17 to 23 October: Official results, including all valid ordinary and special votes, declared.

== Candidates ==
=== Declared candidates ===
- Greg Brownless, incumbent mayor
- Kelvin Clout, deputy mayor
- Murray Guy, former city councillor
- Andrew Hollis
- Jos Nagels
- Tenby Powell, businessman
- John Robson, city councillor
- Christopher Stokes
- RangiMarie TeAmopui-Kaa Kingi
- Les Wallen, pastor

=== Withdrawn candidates ===
- Danny Cancian, property developer
- Dame Susan Devoy DNZM CBE, former Race Relations Commissioner and squash champion

== Result ==
Tenby Powell won the election to become mayor of Tauranga, with 17,299 votes over Brownless' 12,400 in the final STV iteration.

2019 Tauranga mayoral election
Party	Candidate	FPv%	Count								
Party	Candidate	FPv%	1	2	3	4	5	6	7	8	9
Independent	Tenby Powell	32.58%	12,486	12,505	12,554	12,696	12,857	13,098	13,690	15,085	17,299
Independent	Greg Brownless	20.82%	7,978	7,993	8,029	8,105	8,180	8,463	8,989	9,647	12,400
Independent	Kelvin Clout	16.42%	6,295	6,315	6,375	6,484	6,610	6,959	7,533	8,635	
Independent	Andrew Hollis	10.34%	3,964	4,001	4,074	4,219	4,381	4,800	5,715		
Independent	John Robson	7.78%	2,982	3,011	3,044	3,132	3,235	3,474			
Independent	Murray Guy	4.94%	1,893	1,909	1,962	2,031	2,128				
Independent	Christopher Stokes	2.34%	897	916	1,003	1,142					
Independent	Jos Nagels	2.39%	916	932	974						
Independent	Rangimarie Kingi	1.81%	695	703							
Independent	Les Wallen	0.58%	222								
Valid: 38328 Spoilt: 73 + 466 blank Quota: 1st iteration: 19,164; final iteration: 14,850
