= Charles Jordan (mayor) =

Mayor of Tauranga, New Zealand (1838–1912)

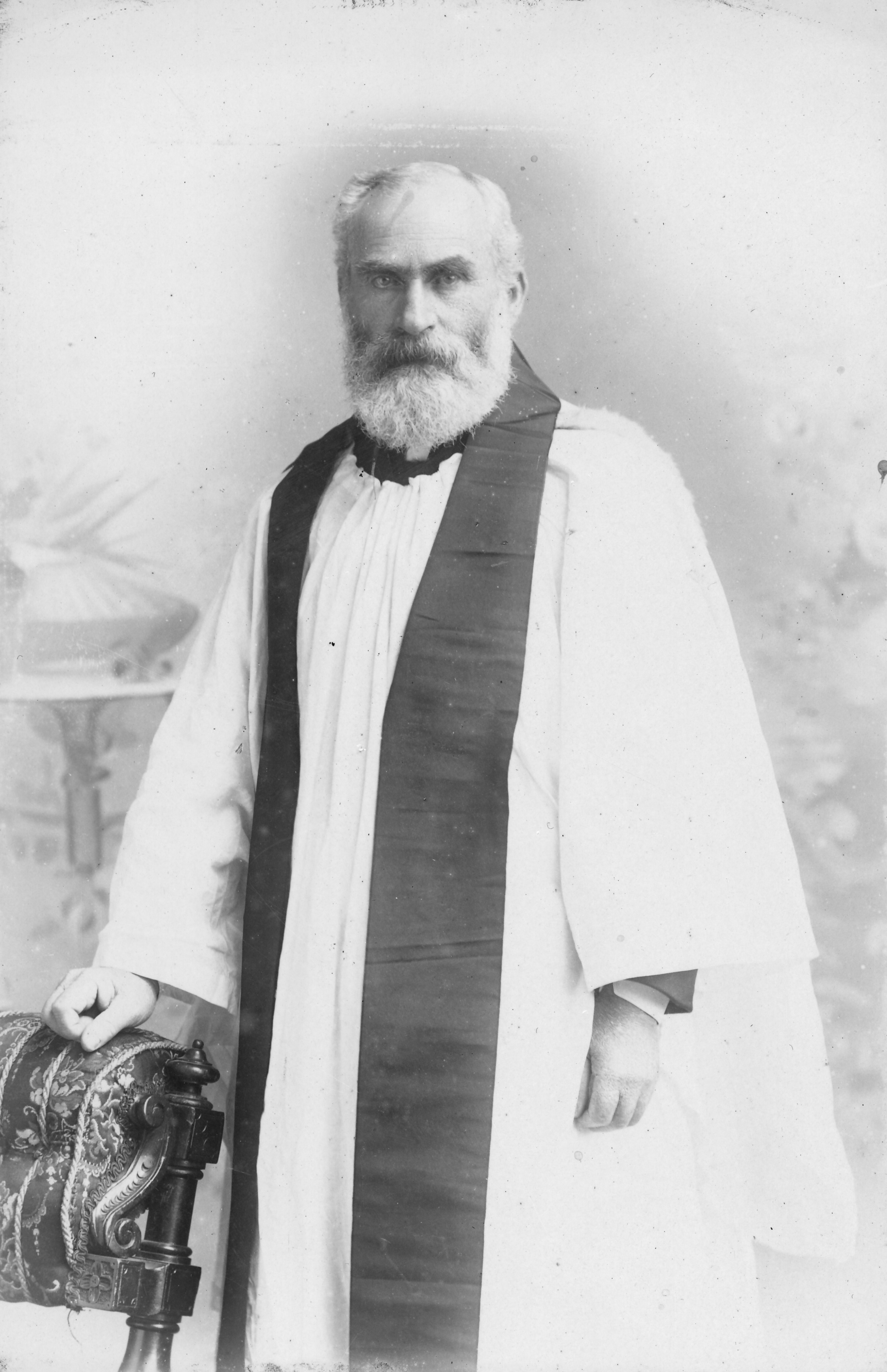

Mayor of Tauranga
- In office 1885–1886
- Preceded by: Thomas Wrigley
- Succeeded by: David Lundon
- In office 1900–1905
- Preceded by: James Weir Gray
- Succeeded by: William McKenzie Commons
- In office 1907–1908
- Preceded by: William McKenzie Commons
- Succeeded by: John Bull
- In office 1909–1910
- Preceded by: John Bull
- Succeeded by: John Bull
- In office 1911–1912
- Preceded by: John Bull
- Succeeded by: Benjamin Robbins

Personal details
- Born: 1838 County Kerry, Ireland
- Died: 5 October 1912 (aged 73–74) Tauranga, Bay of Plenty, North Island, New Zealand
- Spouse: Eleanor Anne Armstrong

Charles Jordan (1838 – 5 October 1912) was an Irish-born New Zealand politician and Anglican clergyman. He was mayor of Tauranga five times (1885–1886, 1900–1905, 1907–1908, 1909–1910 and 1911–1912).

== Biography ==
=== Early life and career ===
Rev Canon Charles Jordan was born in Ventry, near Dingle, County Kerry, Ireland. Charles Jordan was the son of James Jordan and Eliza Jordan (nee O'Connor) and husband of Eleanor Anne Jordan (nee Armstrong), and with her he became the father of James Jordan, Mary Ann Pittar, Joseph Armstrong Jordan, Marguerite Martina Clemson, Eleanor Grace Norris and William Jordan. He was educated at Trinity College Dublin and took his degree of Bachelor of Arts in 1866.

He was ordained in County Galway on 14 July 1867 in St. Mary's Cathedral, Tuam, County Galway by Rev. Dr. Bernard for the curacy of Bangor, in the parish of Kilcomon, Erris. Rev. Jordan continued in Church work in Ireland till 1872, and left on September 11th of that year for Tauranga, being appointed thereto by the commissaries of the former Bishop of Waiapu, Rev. Dr. William Williams. He arrived from Ireland at the end of 1872 to be the first vicar of Holy Trinity Church, a position he kept for 39 years.

=== Death ===
Up until roughly six weeks ago, Rev. Canon Jordan seemed to be in his typical state of health. However, on the eleventh ultimo, he became ill after getting a chill while returning from the Bay of Plenty Hospital and Charitable Aid Board's most recent meeting in Whakatāne. His condition deteriorated to the point where a number of his relatives, who live across the Dominion, were called to his bedside.

According to his obituary, Jordan had "an honorable record of excellent service, and it may be said of him that he sacrificed his personal interests for the good of the people." He died on October 5, 1912.

Political offices
Preceded by Thomas Wrigley	Mayor of Tauranga; 1885–1886	Succeeded by David Lundon
Preceded by James Weir Gray	Mayor of Tauranga; 1900–1905	Succeeded by William McKenzie Commons
Preceded by William McKenzie Commons	Mayor of Tauranga; 1907–1908	Succeeded by John Bull
Preceded by John Bull	Mayor of Tauranga; 1909–1910	Succeeded by John Bull
Preceded by John Bull	Mayor of Tauranga; 1911–1912	Succeeded by Benjamin Robbins
