= Ruawahine Irihapeti Faulkner =

Māori leader and landowner

Ruawahine Irihapeti Faulkner (? – 24 September 1855) was a New Zealand tribal leader and landowner. Of Māori descent, she identified with the Ngāi Te Rangi iwi. She was born in New Zealand. She was married to John Lees Faulkner.
