= Benjamin Robbins =

New Zealand politician

Benjamin Conrad Robbins
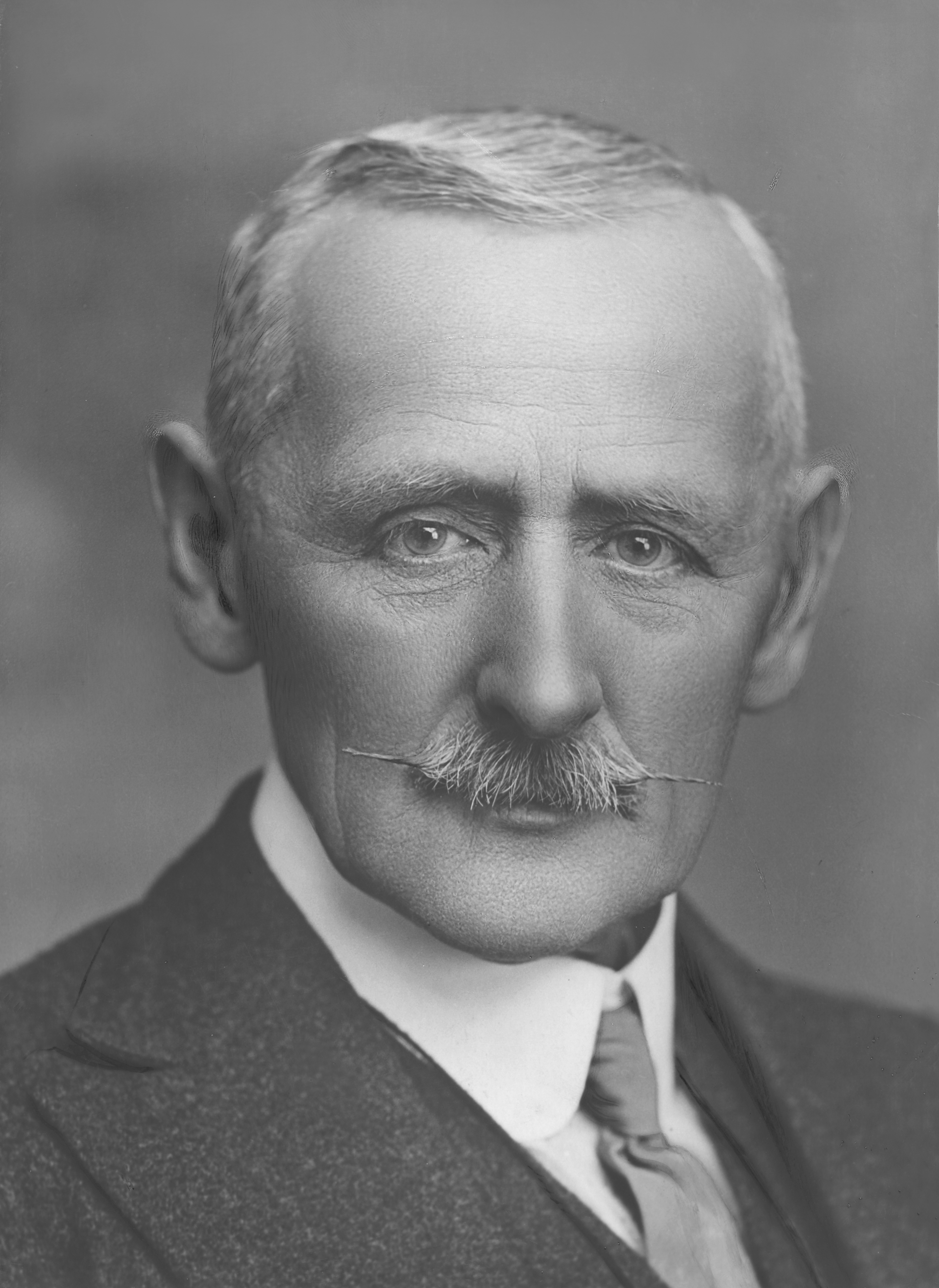

14th Mayor of Tauranga
- In office 6 May 1912 – 5 May 1915
- Preceded by: Charles Jordan
- Succeeded by: Charles Macmillan
- In office 9 May 1929 – 11 May 1933
- Preceded by: Bradshaw Dive
- Succeeded by: Alfred Francis Daly Tunks

Personal details
- Born: 1857 Yarmouth, Nova Scotia
- Died: 20 January 1953 (aged 95–96)
- Resting place: Presbyterian Cemetery, Tauranga
- Party: Liberal

Benjamin Conrad "Cockie" Robbins (1857 – 20 January 1953) was a member of the New Zealand Legislative Council from 9 March 1936 to 8 March 1943; and 9 March 1943 to 8 March 1950.

Robbins was born in Yarmouth, Nova Scotia, son of Capt. B. Robbins, and educated at the Yarmouth Academy. He arrived in Wellington in 1874, and was a storekeeper in Hāwera from 1881. In Hāwera he organised a local dairy factory and the National Dairy Association. He was on various local boards; Fire Board (3 years), Hospital Board (chairman 1906–09), and the Wanganui Education Board 1897–1906. His first public service was as a member of the school committee in Hāwera for a good decade, where he was chairman for most of that time. He was a member of the Hawera Borough Council for fifteen years and Mayor of Hawera for seven years. Robbins stood in the 1893 election in the Egmont electorate and came second of three candidates. He contested the Hawera electorate in the 1896 and 1905 elections. He came a close second in 1896, and came third in 1905.

Robbins moved to Tauranga in 1911, and was Mayor of Tauranga twice, from 1912 to 1915 and 1929 to 1933. He retired from the mayoralty in 1915 and did not contest the election, which was won by Charles Macmillan over John Cuthbert Adams.

Robbins stood against the incumbent, William Herries of the Reform Party, in the 1919 election in the Tauranga electorate and was beaten with a margin of over 30% of the vote. He initially declared himself an Independent Progressive Liberal but received the endorsement of Joseph Ward and was the official candidate of the Liberal Party.

He was appointed to the Legislative Council by the First Labour Government. He died in January 1953 aged 96 and is buried at the Presbyterian Cemetery on 18th Avenue in Tauranga.

He married in 1877 Jane Anne Ross (died 6 March 1950).
