= Vehicle Confiscation and Seizure Bill (New Zealand) =

- Coat of arms of New Zealand

Parliament of New Zealand
- Enacted by: Parliament of New Zealand
- Introduced by: Hon. Judith Collins MP

Related legislation
- New Zealand Land Transport (Enforcement Powers) Act 2009

The New Zealand Vehicle Confiscation and Seizure Bill was a Government bill introduced to the NZ Parliament on 26 March 2009.

It builds upon The Land Transport ( Street and Illegal Drag racing ) Amendment Bill 2002 which was introduced by the previous government of Helen Clark. These two Bills, in combination, formed the Governments legislative response to illegal street racing.

It was divided into three Separate Bills by the Committee of the Whole House on the 20/10/09. These bills took the form of The Sentencing (Vehicle Confiscation ) Amendment Act 2009, The Summary Proceedings ( Vehicle Seizure ) Amendment Act 2009 and The Privacy Amendment Act 2009.

== Aims of the Legislation. ==
“The central objective of this legislation is to significantly reduce the harm and nuisance caused to communities by illegal street racers” - Hon Judith Collins ( Member in charge of the bill ) during the third reading on 20 October 2009.

The bill, in partnership with the Land Transport ( Enforcement Powers Act ), is the primary legislative response to illegal ‘street racing.’ It seeks to increase the powers of the judiciary and law enforcement. Increased powers of the courts involve the ability to order the destruction of vehicles used by recidivist offenders. It was hoped that introducing such a deterrent would encourage the payment of unpaid fines and general safer road usage.

The bill also seeks to close a loophole in the legislation of the time surrounding third parties. The bill extends the courts the necessary powers to confiscate - and potentially destroy - vehicles owned by a third party but utilised by the offender in their offending. This was a major problem for the judicial system under the previous legislation. Approximately half of all vehicles liable for confiscation were owned by a third party.

== Timeline of the Bills Legislative Pathway ==
- Introduction - 26/05/2009
- Date of First Reading - 02/06/2009. Ayes - 112. 58 New Zealand National, 42 New Zealand Labour, 5 Act New Zealand, 5 Maori Party, 1 United Future, 1 Progressive Party. Noes - 9. 9 Green Party.
- Submissions due - 03/07/2009
- Select Committee Report - 15/09/2009
- Date of Second Reading - 13/10/2009. Ayes - 113. 58 New Zealand National, 43 New Zealand Labour, 5 Act New Zealand, 5 Maori Party, 1 United Future, 1 Progressive Party. Noes - 8. 8 Green Party.
- Committee of the Whole House - 20/10/2009 ( Divided by committee of the Whole House )
- Third Readings ( of the now Divided Sentencing (Vehicle Confiscation) Amendment Bill, Summary Proceedings (Vehicle Seizure) Amendment Bill and Privacy Amendment Bill - 20/10/2009 Ayes - 113. 58 New Zealand National, 43 New Zealand Labour, 5 Act New Zealand, 5 Maori Party, 1 United Future, 1 Progressive Party. Noes - 9. 9 Green Party.
- Date of Royal Assent - 27/10/2009

== Debate around the Bill's Introduction ==
As demonstrated above, the New Zealand Parliament overwhelmingly supported the initiative of the National Government in seeking to address the issue of 'boy racing. This however does not mean that the legislation passed without debate. Three Political parties dominated this debate. Their perspectives are outlined below.

The areas of intense / and or repeated debate were:

- The question of crushing as an effective deterrent
- The removal of mandatory confiscation upon a third offence within four years. As outlined in the Sentencing ( Vehicle Confiscation ) Amendment Act 2009, this mandatory confiscation was to be replaced with the discretionary order of the judge.

New Zealand National Party - The Vehicle Confiscation and Seizure bill was a Government bill. Consequently, it was introduced with the support of the government of the time - National. Logically, National supported the bill and, in these later debates defended it quite strongly. National were strong in their belief that crushing would act as an effective deterrent and that the judges would choose to order confiscations when given the ability. Notable National speakers in these debates would be the Hon Judith Collins, Hon Tau Henare and the Hon. Nicky Wagner. The party would unilaterally support the bill, with each of its 58 members voting 'Aye' at each individual vote.

New Zealand Labour Party - The Labour party stated their support for tackling the issue of 'boy racing' early on. Yet whilst Labour unilaterally voted in support of the bill, both before and after it was divided, this does not mean they supported the legislation in its entirety. This was most apparent through the statements of the Hon. Clayton Cosgrove. His believed the removal of mandatory confiscation was a weakening of the very legislation this bill intended to strengthen. This was a major concern for his party. The practical applications of 'crushing' as a deterrent was also questioned by Cosgrove and his colleagues. One strong area of Labour support was for the 3rd Party Loophole closure. Labour recognised this as an unintended consequence of the previous legislation that they had introduced. As can be seen above, Labour decided the benefits of this legislation outweighed any concerns they had. They collectively supported the bill/bills at every vote.

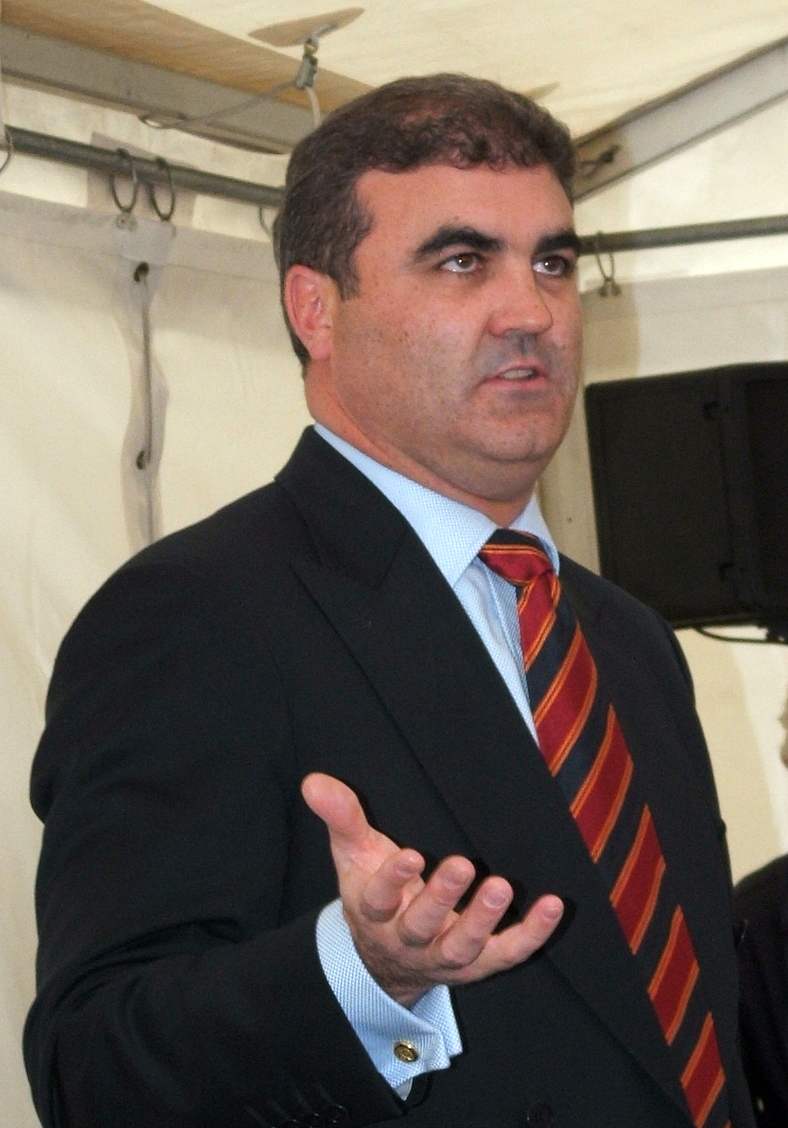
Hon. Clayton Cosgrove. Labour MP.

Green Party of Aotearoa New Zealand - Green Party MP's were the only MP's to not support the bill/bills. They signalled this opposition collectively, with all 9 members voting no. This was due to a number of factors. One such factor was their belief that car crushing was a "draconian measure" that would "not solve the problem." Another factor was their belief the legislation in place was already provided law enforcement the necessary capabilities to tackle these issues.

Additionally the Greens objected to the cost of administering such legislation. Estimated administrative costs of $1.5 million (from the second year onwards) were quoted. The party also criticised the priorities of the government - critiquing why the cars of 'boy racers' were being destroyed whilst vehicles that had been used "to main and kill people" were not subject to these same conditions. Notable speakers for the Greens were the Hon. Jeanette Fitz-Simmons and the Hon. Meteria Turei.

== Sentencing ( Vehicle Confiscation ) Amendment Act 2009 ==
This Act came into force on 1 December 2009. The Sentencing Act 2002 is the Act principally amended by the introduction of the Sentencing (Vehicle Confiscation ) Amendment Act 2009.

It is the intention of this Act to reduce illegal street racing - referred to in the legislation as ‘traffic offending’. Increasing the power of the judiciary to be able to order the confiscation and/or crushing of vehicles is how this is achieved.

Notable Amendments and their meanings.

- 129A - The Court may order the Confiscation and Destruction of a Vehicle after a third illegal street racing offence. These three offences must be committed within a span of four years by the same offender. It does not matter, for this order, the differences between these three offences nor if the vehicle is owned by the offender or owned by a third party.
- 130A - This section seeks to close the loophole of offenders disposing their ownership share in the vehicle after being served with a written caution. It enables the courts to disregard this sale of ownership - and apply Section 128 or 129A - if the court believes the intent behind this sale was not bona fide.
- 132A - This section creates it as an offence to either sell or dispose of a vehicle that is subject to a confiscation order.
- 141A - This section outlines the payments that must occur before section 141 can take place and the order they must take place in. These are the costs associated with the vehicles impoundment and the confiscation costs.
- 141B - This section outlines the manner about which the party, to whom the vehicle was transferred to under 141, would go about selling said vehicle and their responsibilities to the court.

== Summary Proceedings ( Vehicle Seizure ) Amendment Act 2009 ==
The date this act came into force was 1 December 2009. The Summary Proceedings Act 1957 is the Act amended by the introduction of this Act.

The intention behind this Acts introduction is to improve the provisions surrounding the seizure of vehicles and the collection of fines. This specific purpose fits within the overarching goal of reducing traffic offending.

Notable Amendments and their meanings.

- 100C - This section introduces a comprehensive group of measures surrounding the serving of written cautions. The purpose of this caution is to advise the owner of a vehicle - owing to which there are outstanding fines - that this vehicle is able to be seized in the event these fines remain unpaid. The caution also advises that if another traffic offence was to be committed the vehicle would also be able to be seized.
- 100F - This section details the protocol surrounding the actual seizure of said vehicles. What is new is the ability for those seizing the vehicle to also be able to seize any vehicle that the defendant looks to have an ownership share in. They are also able to seize any vehicle that a substitute for the defender looks to have an ownership share in.
- 100R - This section enables substitutes for the defendant - who have an ownership share in the seized vehicle - to challenge the seizure of the said vehicle. This challenge must be within seven days of the seizure and be on the appropriate grounds - for example, that they did not actually have an ownership share in said vehicle.

== Privacy Amendment Act 2009 ==
The date this Act came into force was 1 December 2009. The Privacy Amendment Act 2009 is the smallest of the three Acts divided from the Vehicle Confiscation and Seizure Bill. The Privacy Act 1993 is the Act amended by the introduction of this act.

It seeks to amend Schedule five of the Privacy Act which details information available to law enforcement. Specifically, in this context, it is done with the purpose of aiding the Ministry of Justice to aid them in collecting unpaid fines.

Notable Amendments and their meanings.

- This act only has one amendment. It details the information which the Ministry of Justice (New Zealand) is entitled to. Specifics of the vehicle in which the offence was committed and personal information relating to the offender is now available to the MoJ.

== Impacts of the Acts ==
Flag of the New Zealand Police

Quantifiably, the successfulness of this type of legislation is hard to determine. This is due to the fact that traffic offending is influenced by many factors coincidentally. The most notable of these changing factors is the Road Policing Strategy by the New Zealand Police. In 2010 for example, "Reducing illegal street racing " was a defined goal of the police. These changing four-year initiatives by the police force bring differing degrees of focus upon illegal street racing and as such interfere with any attempt to clearly define the legislation impacts. The statistics provided below, however, are still very useful in demonstrating the legislations impact.

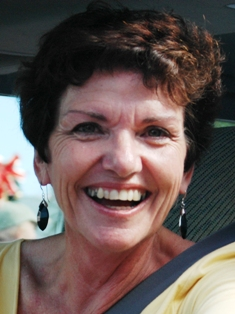
Anne Tolley, Minister of Police 2011-2014

The first car to be crushed - as a result of this legislation - took place on 21 June 2012. On the same day, the Minister of Police, Anne Tolley reported Police data indicating a 29% decrease in 'boy racing' since 2009. She directly linked the legislation as the key deterrent contributing to this decrease. As of 2017, two more vehicles have also been crushed after confiscation, resulting in a total of three.

As the Minister in Charge of the Bill, Judith Collins, stated: “The number of deaths, injuries and crashes due to illegal street racing have plummeted.” Statistics released from her office, in 2016, detailed the number of deaths, injuries and crashes that Police believed 'racing' to have been a contributing factor in. This data - as demonstrated in the table below - clearly tracks a decline in all three categories presented. The mean average of deaths declined from 6.625 in the years 2001-2008 to 2.2 between 2010-2014. In the same time periods - injuries decreased from an average of 82.25 to 28.4 and total crashes also decreased from 86.375 to 40.8.

=== Table of Deaths, Injuries and Crashes in which Racing was a Contributing Factor ===
Year	Deaths	Injuries	Crashes (Injury and Non-Injury)
2001	7	77	70
2002	3	88	85
2003	9	79	72
2004	8	71	77
2005	6	97	97
2006	6	87	92
2007	9	91	116
2008	5	68	82
2009	6	49	69
2010	1	49	71
2011	4	29	42
2012	4	27	36
2013	2	14	32
2014	0	23	23

Other statistics also support the trends purported in the table above. Crashes related to ‘Boy racing’ decreased between the years 2007 and 2015. The record high of 116 racing influenced accidents in 2007 is substantially higher than the 15 crashes reported in 2015. Additionally, statistics provided by Anne Tolley in 2013 revealed a 35% decline in 'boy-racer' / traffic offences. Quantifiably, this decline was from 2738 offences in 2009 to 1759 in 2012.

With regard to recidivist traffic offenders: from the 8,765 offenders since 2009 a total of 172 offenders have been awarded a second strike whilst ten have committed a third offence and are liable to have their vehicles confiscated by the judiciary.

== Criticisms of the Acts ==
Notably, throughout the submission process, many key stakeholders voiced critical opinions towards the act.

Once such stance was taken by the New Zealand Police towards the first incarnation of the Vehicle Confiscation and Seizure Bill. In a submission presented to the Transport and Industrial Relations committee, Police championed the bills intent to "address some of the major concerns associated with habitual irresponsible behaviour involving motor vehicles". However, the Police went on to express some major doubts concerning the effectiveness of the legislation. Their statement "in our view, however, the package of measures as introduced, whilst containing some positive changes, is unlikely in practice to make a great deal of difference overall to the status quo" demonstrates this.

Another criticism of the legislation was its failure to adequately address the impacts of excessive noise. These submissions especially highlighted the phenomenon of 'cruising' has wrought. Modified cars are considered, by these aggrieved individuals, to be the a key factor in this issue. Polling by the New Zealand Automobile Association (AA) revealed this to be the case. 40.8% of those surveyed believed "selling less modifications" would a worthwhile option relative to the vehicle disposal system put forth by the act. This grievance was particularly notable in the submissions of the general public. This group of submissions did not have any substantive impact in altering the legislation.
