= John Lees Faulkner =

New Zealand trader, shipbuilder and farmer

John Lees Faulkner (c.1812–8 September 1882) was a New Zealand trader, shipbuilder and farmer. He was born in Whitby, Yorkshire, England on c.1812. His wife was Ruawahine Irihapeti Faulkner.
