= Mahé Drysdale =

New Zealand rower and mayor of Tauranga (born 1978)

Mahé Drysdale MNZM
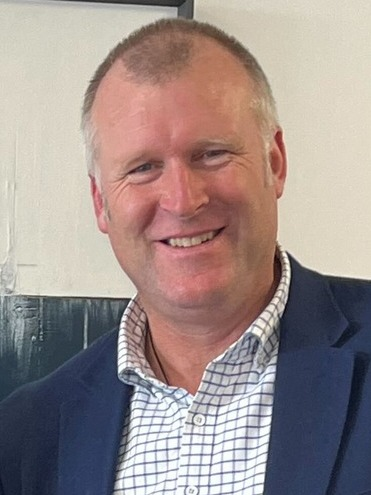
- Drysdale in 2025

Mayor of Tauranga
- Incumbent
- Assumed office 2 August 2024
- Deputy: Jen Scoular
- Preceded by: Vacant (Note: Replaced a crown commission, post was last held by Tenby Powell)

Personal details
- Born: 19 November 1978 (age 47) Melbourne, Victoria, Australia
- Spouse: Juliette Haigh (m. 2013)
- Relatives: Peter Drysdale (brother); Rose Keddell (cousin); Bob Owens (grandfather)
- Sports career
- Height: 2.00 m (6 ft 6 1/2 in)
- Weight: 99 kg (218 lb; 15.6 st)
Medal record
Men's rowing
Representing New Zealand
Olympic Games
Gold medal – first place	2012 London	Single sculls
Gold medal – first place	2016 Rio de Janeiro	Single sculls
Bronze medal – third place	2008 Beijing	Single sculls
World Championships
Gold medal – first place	2005 Kaizu	Single sculls
Gold medal – first place	2006 Dorney	Single sculls
Gold medal – first place	2007 Oberschleißheim	Single sculls
Gold medal – first place	2009 Poznań	Single sculls
Gold medal – first place	2011 Bled	Single sculls
Silver medal – second place	2010 Cambridge	Single sculls
Silver medal – second place	2014 Amsterdam	Single sculls
Silver medal – second place	2015 Aiguebelette-le-Lac	Single sculls

Alexander Mahé Owens Drysdale MNZM (born 19 November 1978) is a New Zealand politician and retired rower. Drysdale is a two-time Olympic champion and a five-time world champion in the single sculls. He is a seven-time New Zealand national champion and five-time recipient of New Zealand Sportsman of the Year. He is the current mayor of Tauranga.

== Early life and background ==
Born in Australia to New Zealand parents, Mahé was named after the largest island in the Seychelles. He attended Tauranga Boys' College in Tauranga, New Zealand, then the University of Auckland where he took up rowing at the age of 18. He initially gave up rowing to concentrate on his studies, but resumed after watching fellow New Zealander Rob Waddell win gold at the 2000 Olympic Games. Drysdale rowed from West End Rowing Club in Avondale, Auckland, New Zealand, and is also a member of the Tideway Scullers School, London.

== Rowing ==
=== World Championships ===
Drysdale first represented New Zealand at the Rowing World Cup III in 2002, in the New Zealand coxless four. After the 2004 Olympic Games, where his New Zealand crew finished fifth in the final, Drysdale switched to the single scull. He won his first World Championship title at the 2005 World Rowing Championships at Gifu, Japan, despite having broken two vertebrae in a crash with a water skier earlier in the year.

He successfully defended his title in 2006 at Dorney Lake, Dorney, England, in 2007 at Oberschleißheim, Germany, and again in 2009 in Poznań, Poland, holding off Britain's Alan Campbell and the Czech Republic's Ondřej Synek. At the 2009 World Rowing Championships, he beat his own world best time in the single, lowering it to 6:33.35. As of 2021 that time stands as the best time at a World Rowing Championship but it was beaten in 2017 by his countryman Robbie Manson for the new men's single scull world record.

=== Olympic Games ===
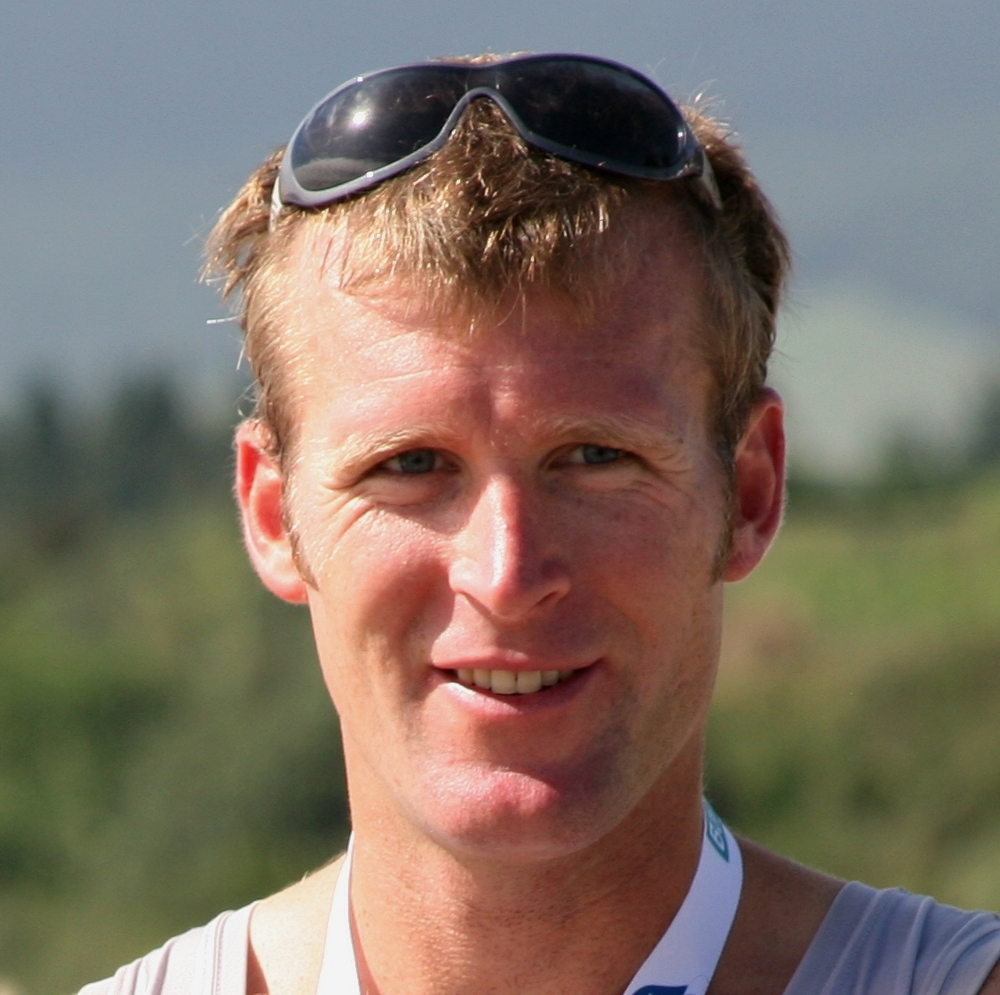
Drysdale in 2010

At his first Olympic Games, in 2004, Drysdale was part of the New Zealand coxless four team that finished fifth.

Drysdale was officially selected as New Zealand's Olympic heavyweight sculler for the Beijing Olympics on 7 March 2008. He was also chosen to carry the flag for New Zealand during the parade of nations in the opening ceremony. Unfortunately for Drysdale, a severe gastrointestinal infection in the week before his final saw him off form and he was only able to win the bronze medal in the men's single scull. The gold and silver medals went to Olaf Tufte from Norway and Ondřej Synek from the Czech Republic, respectively. Clearly suffering from his illness, after his race Drysdale was carried by life raft and then moved to a waiting ambulance. He was also seen vomiting. He was, however, able to stand to be awarded his medal.

At the 2012 Summer Olympics Drysdale won the gold medal in the men's single sculls, despite throwing up the morning of race day due to nervousness. He has since been dethroned, and had to settle with silver in the world championships leading up to the 2016 Olympics, each time bested by the Czech Ondřej Synek, who won the WC in 2010, 2013, 2014 and 2015.

At the 2016 Summer Olympics, Drysdale successfully defended his Olympic men's single sculls title, taking the gold medal over Croatia's Damir Martin. The race was decided by a photo finish, with Drysdale edging out Martin by half a bow ball. In November 2016, Drysdale announced that he would take a break from rowing in 2017. He returned to the New Zealand squad at the end of 2017 with a view of competing at the 2020 Tokyo Olympics.

After losing out to Jordan Parry in selection for the single scull at the rearranged 2020 Tokyo Olympics, Drysdale announced his retirement from international rowing in June 2021.

=== New Zealand national championships ===
Drysdale won the gold medal six times in single sculls at the New Zealand national championships through 2010. In 2011, he won the silver medal in single sculls at the New Zealand National Rowing Championships at Lake Ruataniwha in Twizel, losing to Nathan Cohen by two lengths. He reclaimed the national title in 2012, where Cohen took second. He did not compete in 2013.

=== Other ===
In 2018, he won a sixth Diamond Challenge Sculls title (the premier event for single sculls) at the Henley Royal Regatta.

== Canoe polo ==
Drysdale has also represented New Zealand in canoe polo as a junior. He represented NZ in an under-18 team that toured to Fiji. Later he was a NZ under-21 representative that toured to Tonga. In 1999–2000 he was executive of NZ Canoe Polo.

== Awards ==
Drysdale has won the Sportsman of the Year award at the Halberg Awards on five occasions (2006, 2007, 2009, 2012, and 2016). He is the only New Zealander to have won the award more than three times. In 2006 he also won the Halberg Supreme Prize.

He won the University of Auckland Young Alumnus of the Year Award in 2007, and was awarded Member of the New Zealand Order of Merit for services to rowing in the 2009 New Year Honours.

== Politics ==
On 19 May 2024, Drysdale announced his candidacy for the Tauranga mayoralty. On 20 July 2024, Drysdale was elected as mayor, and was sworn in on 2 August. Jen Scoular became deputy mayor.

On 14 October 2024, the majority of the Tauranga City Council voted 6 to 3 to adopt a resolution to fluoridate the city's water supply, which came into effect on 24 October. The vote was in response to a directive by the Director-General of Health, Dr Diana Sarfati, to fluoridate Tauranga's water supply. Drysdale voted against the resolution, citing "concerns about fluoride's impact on people's health" and a desire for assurance from Sarfati that recent evidence continued to support fluoridation as a safe and risk-free public health measure.

Drysdale was elected as mayor of Tauranga while living outside the city, and stated before the election he would not immediately move to Tauranga. As of 2025, Drysdale lives in the Waikato town of Cambridge, but has purchased a house in Papamoa, a suburb of Tauranga, and has stated he will move to the house at the end of the school year, to avoid disrupting his primary-school aged children.

== Personal life ==
Drysdale married fellow rower and Olympic bronze medallist Juliette Haigh in September 2013. They have three children, a daughter born in October 2014, a son in January 2017, and another daughter in September 2019.

Drysdale is cousin to Rose Keddell, a member of the New Zealand women's hockey team. His younger brother, Peter, is a cricketer. His grandfather, Bob Owens, served as mayor of Tauranga from 1968 to 1977.

== Notes ==
Awards
Preceded by Michael Campbell	Halberg Awards – Supreme Award; 2006	Succeeded by Valerie Vili
Preceded by Michael Campbell	New Zealand's Sportsman of the Year; 2006, 2007; 2009; 2012; 2016	Succeeded by Scott Dixon
Preceded by Scott Dixon	New Zealand's Sportsman of the Year; 2006, 2007; 2009; 2012; 2016	Succeeded by Richie McCaw
Preceded by Richie McCaw	New Zealand's Sportsman of the Year; 2006, 2007; 2009; 2012; 2016	Succeeded by Scott Dixon
Preceded by Kane Williamson	New Zealand's Sportsman of the Year; 2006, 2007; 2009; 2012; 2016	Succeeded by Tomas Walsh
Preceded by Caroline and Georgina Evers-Swindell	Lonsdale Cup; 2009	Succeeded by Silver Ferns
Political offices
Vacant Title last held by Tenby Powell	Mayor of Tauranga; 2024–present	Incumbent
