= Noel Pope (mayor) =

New Zealand local-body politician (1931–2019)

Noel Pope CNZM JP

25th Mayor of Tauranga
- In office 8 October 1983 – 14 October 1989
- Preceded by: Ray Dillon
- Succeeded by: Keith Clarke
- In office 14 October 1995 – 13 October 2001
- Preceded by: Keith Clarke
- Succeeded by: Jan Beange

Personal details
- Born: Noel Frank Pope; 28 September 1931 Hamilton, New Zealand
- Died: 15 August 2019 (aged 87)
- Spouse: Ena Ethel Edgar (m. 1953)
- Children: 3
- Education: Tauranga College
- Occupation: Electrician

Noel Frank Pope CNZM JP (28 September 1931 – 15 August 2019) was a New Zealand local-body politician. He served as Mayor of Tauranga from 1983 to 1989 and again in 1995 to 2001.

In the 1998 Queen's Birthday Honours, Pope was appointed a Companion of the New Zealand Order of Merit, for services to local government. He died on 15 August 2019.
