= College of Technology and Museum Extension =

Listed building in Liverpool, England

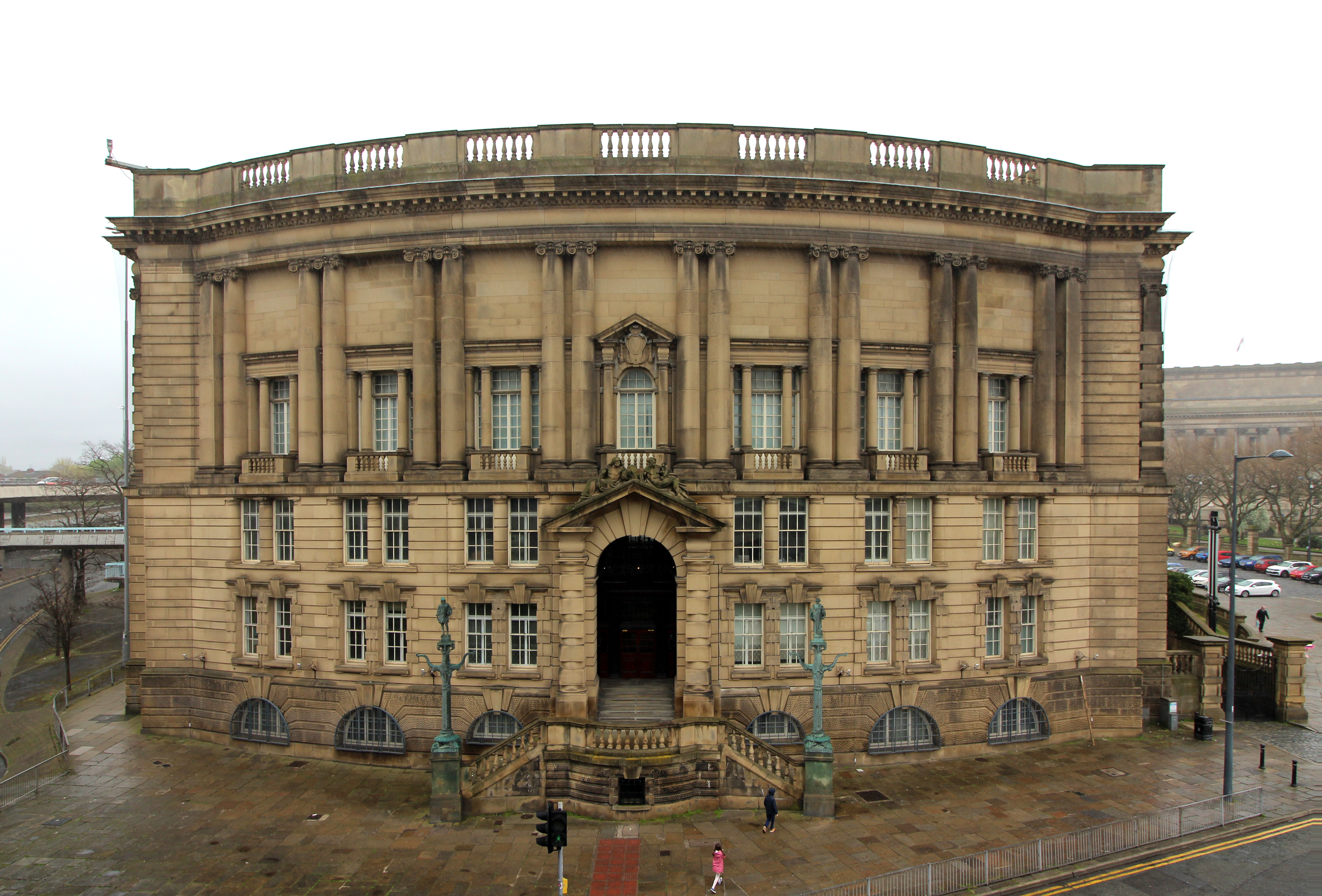
- The building in 2018
- Interactive map of the College of Technology and Museum Extension area

General information
- Location: Byrom Street, Liverpool, England
- Coordinates: 53°24′36″N 2°58′57″W
- Year built: 1896–1909

Design and construction
- Architect: Edward William Mountford
- Designations

Listed Building – Grade II*
- Official name: College of Technology and Museum Extension
- Designated: 12 July 1966
- Reference no.: 1205724

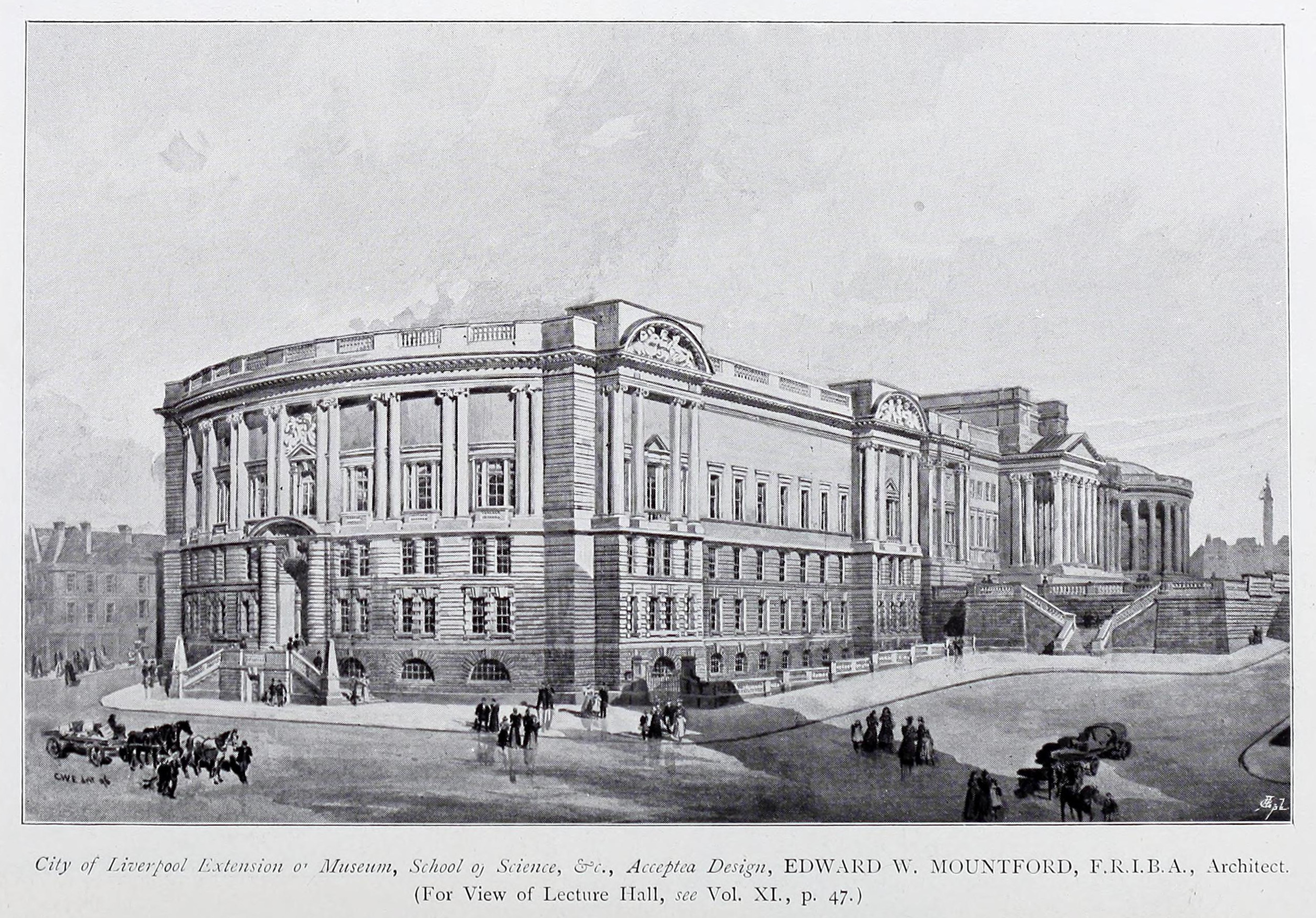
Perspective drawing

The College of Technology and Museum Extension on Byrom Street in Liverpool, England, was built between 1896 and 1909, the architect was Edward William Mountford. The building was constructed to provide a new College of Technology and an extension to the museum. The college occupied the lower levels and the museum the upper levels. Bomb damage led to some reconstruction work in the 1960s. The building was Grade II* listed in 1966.

The lower levels were taken over by Liverpool Polytechnic and its successor Liverpool John Moores University. Initially, they held the engineering department but were subsequently split between the Sports Science and Computing Services departments, being home to the University's DEC computers.

More recently, during the transformation of Liverpool Museum into World Museum Liverpool, the museum acquired the remainder of the building which now houses its research department.

== See also ==
- Architecture of Liverpool
- Grade II* listed buildings in Liverpool – City Centre
