= Mayor of Tauranga =

- Coat of arms of Tauranga

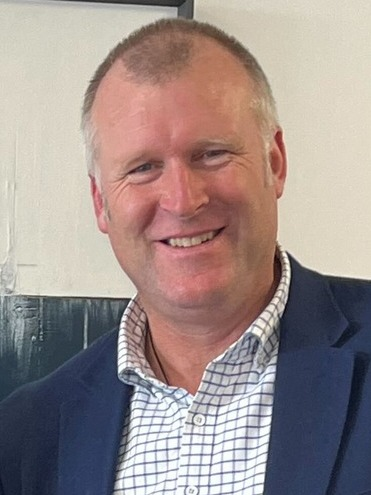
- Incumbent; Mahé Drysdale since 2 August 2024
- Style: His/Her Worship
- Seat: Tauranga
- Term length: 3 years, renewable (Note: Following the 2024 election, the mayor will serve a 4 years term until the 2028 local elections.)
- Formation: 1882
- First holder: George Vesey Stewart
- Deputy: Jen Scoular
- Salary: $172,918
- Website: Official website

The mayor of Tauranga is the head of local government in Tauranga, New Zealand's fifth-largest city. The mayor presides over the Tauranga City Council. The mayor is directly elected using the single transferable vote method. The current mayor is Mahé Drysdale, elected in the 2024 Tauranga local elections. He assumed office on 2 August.

== History ==
Tauranga was gazetted as a borough in 1882, and achieved sufficient population to become a city in 1963. The 1989 Local Body reforms saw the city become part of the Tauranga District, before the City of Tauranga was reproclaimed in 2004.

Elections for mayor were held annually from 1882 up to 1915, when terms become two years. In 1935 terms were made three years, the current system. The election used first-past-the-post voting up until the 2016 election, then changed to single transferable vote.

One of Tauranga's longest-serving mayors was Canon Charles Jordan, who was mayor for nine years in total over five separate periods. He is the subject of a commemorative statue, unveiled in Tauranga Domain in 1916, four years after his death.

Tenby Powell was elected to the mayoralty in October 2019 but resigned in November 2020, eight months after he was unanimously censured by his council for an angry outburst. Following further mayoral "outbursts," Powell publicly called for the Minister of Local Government to appoint a commission to replace the "dysfunctional" council. The decision to cancel the election for a new mayor and councillors, and the appointment of a Crown commission instead by minister Nanaia Mahuta on 9 February 2021 was not without controversy. A legal opinion by law firm Russell McVeagh found her decision may have been "unlawful" and Tauranga MP Simon Bridges called the decision "dramatic and draconian", while saying that Powell quitting removed "a significant source of friction" and it was reasonable to assume the council would become more functional with the election of a new Mayor and Councillor.

The council and mayor were restored following elections in 2024. Mahé Drysdale was elected as mayor.

== List of mayors ==
	Name	Portrait	Term
Tauranga Borough Council (1882–1963)
1	George Vesey Stewart		1882
2	Richard Coles Jordan		1882–1883
3	Thomas Wrigley		1883–1885
4	Charles Jordan		1885–1886
5	David Lundon		1886–1888
6	James Bodell		1888–1889
7	Robert Sharpe Galbraith		1889–1890
(5)	David Lundon		1890–1893
8	Richard John Gill		1893
9	Charles Angus Clarke		1893–1898
10	Gerard Arnold Ward		1898–1899
11	James Weir Gray		1899–1900
(4)	Charles Jordan		1900–1905
12	William McKenzie Commons		1906–1907
(4)	Charles Jordan		1907–1908
13	John Bull		1908–1909
(4)	Charles Jordan		1909–1910
(13)	John Bull		1910–1911
(4)	Charles Jordan		1911–1912
14	Benjamin Robbins		1912–1915
15	Charles Macmillan		1915–1917
16	John Cuthbert Adams		1917–1919
17	Bradshaw Dive		1919–1929
(14)	Benjamin Robbins		1929–1933
18	Alfred Francis Daly Tunks		1933–1935
19	Lionel Wilkinson		1935–1950
20	Bill Barnard		1950–1952
(19)	Lionel Wilkinson		1952–1956
21	David Mitchell		1956–1963
Tauranga City Council (1963–1989)
(21)	David Mitchell		1963–1968
22	Bob Owens		1968–1977
23	Eric Faulkner		1977–1980
24	Raymond Francis Dillon		1980–1983
25	Noel Pope		1983–1989
Tauranga District Council (1989–2003)
26	Keith "Nobby" Clarke		1989–1995
(25)	Noel Pope		1995–2001
27	Jan Beange		2001–2003
Tauranga City Council (2003–present)
(27)	Jan Beange		2003–2004
28	Stuart Crosby		2004–2016
29	Greg Brownless		2016–2019
30	Tenby Powell		2019–2020
–	Replaced by Crown commission chaired by Anne Tolley		2020–2024
31	Mahé Drysdale		2024–

== Sources ==
- Mayors of Tauranga, 1882– Tauranga City Council
- History of Tauranga and Western Bay of Plenty
