= 2019 Bay of Plenty Regional Council election =

Local election in New Zealand

- 12 October 2019

The 2019 Bay of Plenty Regional Council election was a local election held from 20 September until 12 October in the Bay of Plenty region of New Zealand as part of that year's nation-wide local elections. Voters elected fourteen regional councillors for the 2019–2022 term of the Bay of Plenty Regional Council. Postal voting and the first-past-the-post voting system were used.

== Results ==
=== Eastern Bay of Plenty General Constituency (2) ===
Both candidates were elected.

Bay of Plenty Regional Council election, 2019 – Eastern Bay of Plenty General Constituency (2 vacancies)
Party	Candidate	Votes	%	±%
Independent	Bill Clark	n/a		
Independent	Douglas Leeder	n/a		

=== Kōhī Māori Constituency (1) ===
Bay of Plenty Regional Council election, 2019 – Kōhī Māori Constituency (1 vacancy)
Party	Candidate	Votes	%	±%
Independent	Toi Kai Rākau Iti	2,450	60.81%	–
Independent	Tiipene Marr	1,579	39.19%	−14.15%
Total valid votes		4,029		
Informal votes		8		
Turnout		4,037		

=== Mauāo Māori Constituency (1) ===
Bay of Plenty Regional Council election, 2019 – Mauāo Māori Constituency (1 vacancy)
Party	Candidate	Votes	%	±%
Independent	Matemoana McDonald	1,547	58.00%	–
Independent	Riki Nelson	1,120	41.99%	–
Total valid votes		2,667		
Informal votes		49		
Turnout		2,716		

=== Ōkurei Māori Constituency (1) ===
The candidate was elected unopposed.

Bay of Plenty Regional Council election, 2019 – Ōkurei Māori Constituency (1 vacancy)
Party	Candidate	Votes	%	±%
Independent	Te Taru White	n/a		

=== Rotorua General Constituency (2) ===
Bay of Plenty Regional Council election, 2019 – Rotorua General Constituency (2 vacancies)
Party	Candidate	Votes	%	±%
Independent	Kevin Winters	9,573	37.33%	+8.59%
Independent	Lyall Thurston	8,284	32.30%	+1.54%
Living and Working for Rotorua	Katie Priscilla Paul	7,787	30.37%	+13.63%
Total valid votes		25,644		
Informal votes		5		
Turnout		25,649		

=== Tauranga General Constituency (5) ===
All candidates were elected.

Bay of Plenty Regional Council election, 2019 – Tauranga General Constituency (5 vacancies)
Party	Candidate	Votes	%	±%
Independent	Stuart Crosby	n/a		
LOVE TAURANGA!	David Love	n/a		
Lets BANG This OUT	Stacey Rose	n/a		
Independent	Paula Thompson	n/a		
ACTION not WORDS	Andrew von Dadelszen	n/a		

=== Western Bay of Plenty General Constituency (2) ===
Bay of Plenty Regional Council election, 2019 – Western Bay of Plenty General Constituency (2 vacancies)
Party	Candidate	Votes	%	±%
Independent	Jane Nees	7,067	32.45%	–
Independent	Norm Bruning	5,608	25.75%	–
Independent	Matthew Farrell	4,563	20.96%	–
Independent	Jenny Hobbs	4,537	20.84%	–
Total valid votes		21,775		
Informal votes		40		
Turnout				
