= Tauranga City Council =

Territorial authority of New Zealand

- Brand logo

Type
- Type: Territorial authority of Tauranga
- Term limits: None

History
- Established: 1 November 1989; 36 years ago
- Preceded by: Tauranga City Council; Mount Maunganui Borough Council
- New session started: 26 July 2024

Leadership
- Mayor: Mahé Drysdale, Ind. since 26 July 2024
- Deputy: Jen Scoular, Ind. since 2 August 2024
- CEO: vacant since 29 September 2026

Structure
- Seats: 10 (including mayor)
- Political groups: Independent (10)

Elections
- Voting system: Single transferable vote
- First election: 14 October 1989
- Last election: 20 July 2024
- Next election: 14 October 2028

Meeting place
- 90 Devonport Road

Website
- www.tauranga.govt.nz

Tauranga City Council is the territorial authority for the city of Tauranga, New Zealand. It serves as the city's local government alongside the Bay of Plenty Regional Council as the regional council. From 1989 until 2003 the authority was known as the Tauranga District Council.

A borough council for the area was first formed in 1888, and was granted city status in 1963. Following the 1989 reforms to local government, that city council was dissolved and the current authority established.

The governing body of council has 9 councillors and is chaired by the mayor of Tauranga (currently Mahé Drysdale since July 2024).

== History ==
=== Predecessors ===
The historic predecessor was Tauranga Borough Council, which existed from 1888 to 1963. Tauranga City Council was then formed and existed from 1963 until the 1989 local government reforms. Post-amalgamation with other authorities in 1989 (e.g. Mount Maunganui Borough Council), Tauranga District Council existed until 2003 when it again became Tauranga City Council.

=== Crown commission and suspension ===
On 20 November 2020, Mayor of Tauranga Tenby Powell resigned following infighting between himself and city councillors. The resignation came eight months after the mayor was unanimously censured by his council for an angry outburst. Following further mayoral "outbursts," Powell publicly called for the Minister of Local Government to appoint a commission to replace the "dysfunctional" council.

On 18 December 2020, Minister of Local Government Nanaia Mahuta confirmed that the government would be appointing commissioners to administrate Tauranga in response to infighting within the council. The commissioners' terms began in early 2021 and were scheduled to last until the next local elections scheduled for October 2022, but was later extended to July 2024. The commissioners were stood down by Minister of Local Government Simeon Brown despite seeking reappointment. Elected representatives returned in August 2024.

== Governing body ==
=== Mayor ===
Under most circumstances, the council is presided over by the mayor. At its first meeting after a local election, the council elects from among its members a deputy mayor, who acts as mayor in the absence and with the consent, or in the incapacity, of the mayor. The deputy mayor also presides at meetings if the mayor is not present. The deputy mayor serves until losing his set on the council, unless removed from office by a vote of the council.

=== Current composition ===
The current members of the governing body of council are:

Role	Portrait	Name	Affiliation	Ward
Mayor		Mahé Drysdale	Strong Accountable Leadership	Elected at-large
Deputy Mayor		Jen Scoular	Commercial acumen, community heart	Mauao/Mount Maunganui
Councillor		Hemi Rolleston		Te Awanui
Councillor		Rick Curach	Pick Rick community needs over wants	Arataki
Councillor		Kevin (Herb) Schuler	Constructive and Positive Leadership	Bethlehem
Councillor		Glen Crowther	Accountability, Transparency, Community	Matua
Councillor		Steve Morris	Championing Papamoa on Council	Pāpāmoa
Councillor		Marten Rozeboom		Tauriko
Councillor		Rod Taylor	Tauranga True	Te Papa
Councillor		Hautapu Baker	Healthy Environment Thriving Community	Welcome Bay

== Elections ==
The council is normally elected every three years, using the single transferable vote voting system. The vote is conducted by postal ballot. The 2007 election, which closed on 13 October 2007, had a turnout of 40%. Turnouts have since been 38.07% 2010, 37.78% 2013, 43.64% 2016, 40.28% 2019.

Tauranga City Council formerly used the first-past-the-post (FPP) voting system until 2019, when it switched to using single transferable vote (STV).

No election was held for the Tauranga City Council during the 2022 local elections, due to the council having been replaced with a Crown commission. The next elections for the city council were instead held during July 2024.

Tauranga City Council created nine electoral wards for the 2024 local elections. There are eight general wards (Mauao/Mount Maunganui, Arataki, Pāpāmoa, Welcome Bay, Matua-Otūmoetai, Bethlehem, Tauriko and Te Papa) and one Māori ward (Te Awanui, covering the entire city), which each return one councillor.

In January 2025, Te Awanui Māori ward councillor Mikaere Sydney resigned his seat after not being able to take up his position as councillor due to illness. A by-election to fill his seat was held in April 2025, and Sydney's uncle Hemi Rolleston was elected.
