= Bessie Te Wenerau Grace =

First Māori woman university graduate; educator

- Born: 28 October 1889; Pukawa, New Zealand
- Died: 20 June 1944 (aged 54); Melbourne, Victoria, Australia
- Resting place: Box Hill Cemetery
- Other names: Wene Grace, Sister Eudora CSC
- Education: St Mary's College, University of London
- Known for: First female Māori university graduate
- Father: Lawrence Grace
- Relatives: Thomas Grace (grandfather); Te Heuheu Tūkino IV (grandfather); Hāmi Grace (brother)

Bessie Te Wenerau Grace (28 October 1889 – 20 June 1944), also known as Wene and Sister Eudora, was a New Zealand teacher and education leader. In 1926, while living in Kilburn, London, she completed a bachelor of arts from the University of Canterbury by distance, making her the first Māori woman to graduate from university.

== Early life and education ==
Grace was born on 28 October 1889 at Pukawa, on the shores of Lake Taupō. Her mother, Te Kahui Te Heuheu (1860–1929), was the eldest daughter of Horonuku Te Heuheu, a Ngāti Tūwharetoa paramount chief. Her father was Lawrence Grace, a missionary's son, who was a member of parliament for Tauranga. Grace was the eldest of twelve children. Although Grace's father had established a Native School in Pukawa in 1895, of which his own brother was headmaster, he wanted his own children to be educated in a New Zealand European school. Grace and her siblings were brought up in Blenheim by her uncle and aunt, Archdeacon and Mrs Grace, and attended Blenheim Borough Primary School. She won the Marlborough Education Board Scholarship in 1898, enabling her to attend secondary school without fees. Between 1899 and 1903, Grace was a boarder at Nelson College for Girls, about 70 miles (110 km) outside of Blenheim. The college was run by Kate Edger, New Zealand's first female university graduate. Grace was probably the first Māori student at the college. It was at college that Bessie met and became life-long friends with artist and physiotherapist Cora Wilding.

Grace remained at Nelson College after matriculating. The teachers, including Kate Edger, Althea Tendall and Beatrice Gibson, were mostly graduates of Canterbury themselves, and had such strong links with the University College in Christchurch, that it was made an adjunct college, allowing girls to study and sit their exams without travelling to Christchurch.

In 1905, Grace enrolled in the college in Christchurch, where she was to remain for seven years. She represented the University College in tennis and hockey in local matches, and partnered future world champion Anthony Wilding in mixed doubles. In 1909, Grace was elected vice president of the Canterbury Students’ Association Executive, and was joined by her brother, Lawrence William Te Heuheu Grace, the following year.

Grace had trained as a teacher, and was appointed as House Mistress and to teach English at St Margaret's Girls' College in Christchurch in 1912. The school is a private Anglican school, at that time run by three members of the Community of the Sisters of the Church assisted by several lay teachers. During her time there, Grace also taught swimming, diving, golf, and was president of the Literary Club. In 1912, Grace's pupils debated the neighbouring Christchurch Girls' High School with a motion set by Grace, "that the execution of Mary Queen of Scots was justifiable". St Margaret's lost the debate, but won the prize for best speech, which was given by Ngaio Marsh.

== Europe ==
In 1912, Grace and her married sister Agnes both applied for legal status as New Zealand Europeans, under the Native Land Amendment Act of 1912. They were two of the first four Māori to be Europeanised in this way. The status of European holders of native land would have allowed the Grace sisters to sell the land they had inherited individually rather than having to be bound by collective title. Grace had already planned to travel to Europe, and may have considered it would be easier to travel overseas as a New Zealand European.

Grace travelled with her cousin Monica to England in May 1913, where they visited Cora Wilding, who was studying art at Bushey in Hertfordshire, stayed with their uncle, the Reverend George Grace in Stanstead Abbotts, and met up with Grace's brother Richard, who was studying medicine at the University of Edinburgh. At some point prior to the trip or during it, Grace became engaged to Anthony Wilding, but told her siblings that she called it off. She returned to New Zealand alone in 1914.

== Teaching career ==
Despite not having finished university, Grace attained a position at St Hilda's Collegiate in Dunedin from 1915 to teach the fourth form, tennis and singing. By 1921, having seen colleagues leave St Hilda's to teach in schools in Burma, Australia, and London, Grace decided she would travel to the mother house of the Sisters of the Church in Kilburn, London, to become a religious sister.

Grace arrived at Kilburn in September 1922, and was received as a novice on 2 July 1924. The order encouraged Grace to finished her undergraduate degree, and she completed her Bachelor of Arts at distance through the Canterbury University College in 1926, having studied French, German and education, and also attained a blue for lawn tennis. This made her the first Māori woman to earn a university degree. In 1926, Grace enrolled at St Mary's College, in the University of London, where she graduated in 1927 with an MA with first-class honours in modern languages. She was awarded the Berlitz Diploma for studies in French, German and Spanish. On 7 September 1928, Grace was professed at Kilburn, under the name Sister Eudora, meaning Excellent Gift.

Grace was headmistress of St Hilda's Collegiate School in Paddington from 1928 until it closed in 1936. For three years, Grace took a break from teaching, and was at St Mary's Convalescent Home in Broadstairs, caring for sick children and orphans.

== Australia ==
In 1939 the order requested that she lead the order's school in Melbourne. She was remembered by her former pupils as "so approachable, so human but not one of us ever doubted her strength or control of a situation". Grace remained as headmistress of St Michael's School in Melbourne until her death in 1944.

In November 1943, Grace returned to New Zealand to visit family, and arranged for them to purchase a house in Devonport for her retirement. However shortly after her return to Melbourne, she was diagnosed with cancer. She died on 20 June 1944 and was interred at Box Hill Cemetery in Melbourne.

== Legacy ==
Cora Wilding commissioned a carved wooden cup to be made by a Māori carver at the Dominion Museum. The Wene Grace Cup is awarded annually after the inter-Anglican girls' school speech competition. Wilding remembered her friend as "immensely popular, a splendid hockey captain, tennis champion, above all set an example of absolute integrity and a keen sense of honour – her word once given was never broken".

In 2017, Grace was selected as one of the Royal Society Te Apārangi's 150 women in 150 words, celebrating the contributions of women to knowledge in New Zealand.
