= Thomas Grace =

Thomas Grace may refer to:

- Thomas Grace (Archdeacon of Ardfert) (1770–1848), Irish priest
- Thomas Grace (Archdeacon of Marlborough) (fl. 1873–1890), Anglican priest in New Zealand, son of the above
- Thomas Grace (bishop of Sacramento) (1846–1921), Irish-born Roman Catholic bishop
- Thomas Grace (bishop of Saint Paul) (1814–1897), Roman Catholic bishop in the USA
- Thomas Grace (cricketer) (1890–1915), New Zealand cricketer
- Thomas Grace (missionary) (1815–1879), English-born Anglican missionary to New Zealand
- Tom Grace (born 1948), Irish rugby union player
- Thomas Grace (Alias), a character on the spy-fi drama series Alias

== See also ==
- Thomas de Grace (1584–1636), Roman Catholic prelate
