= 2022 Tauranga by-election =

Tauranga by-election in 2022

- 18 June 2022

Tauranga constituency of the House of Representatives
- Turnout: 20,784 (40.19%)
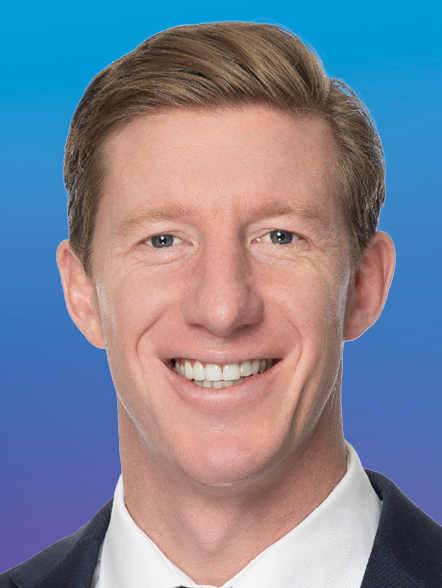

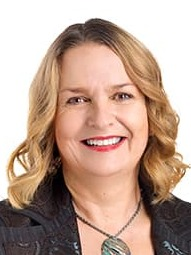

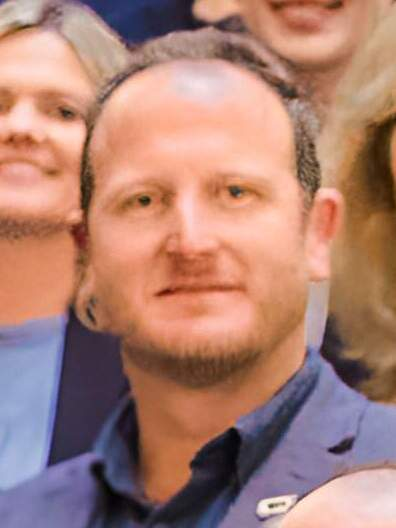
Candidate	Sam Uffindell	Jan Tinetti	Cameron Luxton
Party	National	Labour	ACT
Popular vote	11,613	5,259	2,133
Percentage	55.87%	25.30%	10.26%
Swing	▲13.11	▼13.23	▲6.29
- Uffindell: 30–40% 40–50% 50–60% 60–70% Tinetti: 30–40% No polling places
MP before election
Simon Bridges
National
Elected MP
Sam Uffindell
National

The 2022 Tauranga by-election for the New Zealand House of Representatives was held on 18 June 2022 in the Tauranga electorate, after the sitting member, former National Party leader Simon Bridges, resigned from parliament. The National Party's Sam Uffindell won the by-election in a landslide result, ahead of the Labour Party's Jan Tinetti.

== Background ==
The Tauranga electorate is based around the eponymous city of Tauranga as well as Mount Maunganui and Omanu Beach. It was created in 1881, disestablished in 1890 and reestablished in 1908. Since the 1908 election the electorate has voted mostly conservatively with the exception of 1935 wherein Charles Burnett was voted from the Labour Party. Winston Peters, former Deputy Prime Minister, was the Tauranga MP from 1984 to 2005 — representing the National Party from 1984 to 1993, at which stage Peters left the party to establish New Zealand First. In 2005 the electorate was regained for National by Bob Clarkson and it has been held by the party since.

In 2020 the incumbent MP Simon Bridges was reelected with a majority of 1,856 votes (4.23%), National's lowest majority in the electorate since 2005.

=== Outgoing member ===
Bridges took over the electorate from Clarkson in 2008 and was reelected in every triennial election since. On 15 March 2022, Bridges announced his retirement from politics, thereby causing a by-election. Bridges served as a cabinet minister during the Fifth National Government of New Zealand, Bridges was Minister of Economic Development, Minister for Transport, and Minister for Communications. Following the 2017 election and the formation of the Sixth Labour Government Bridges was elected National Party leader and became Leader of the Opposition between 2018 and 2020, at which stage Todd Muller took over leadership.

=== Election schedule ===
Key dates relating to the by-election are as follows:

15 March 2022 (Tuesday)	Incumbent Member Simon Bridges foreshadows his resignation
6 April 2022 (Wednesday)	Prime Minister Jacinda Ardern announces the by-election will be held on 18 June 2022
10 May 2022 (Tuesday)	Regulated period for election expenses starts day after notice of vacancy published
11 May 2022 (Wednesday)	Writ Day – Governor General issues writ directing the Electoral Commission to hold the Tauranga by-election. Voters enrolled after this date cast a special declaration vote.
17 May 2022 (Tuesday)	Nominations close (12:00) for candidates in the Tauranga by-election. Tauranga by-election candidates announced by the Electoral Commission.
1 June 2022 (Wednesday)	Overseas voting starts
4 June 2022 (Saturday)	Advance voting starts
17 June 2022 (Friday)	All political advertising ceases and election signs taken down by midnight. Last day for overseas voters to enrol.
18 June 2022 (Saturday)	Election day – polling places open from 9:00 to 19:00. Results progressively released after 19:00.
1 July 2022 (Friday)	Official results declared
7 July 2022 (Thursday)	Writ returned, official declaration of successful candidate and elected member

== Candidates ==
National in a press release, announced the timeline for candidate nomination submissions, starting from 29 March and ending 13 April. The candidate will be decided on 1 May. Rotorua Lakes District Councillor Tania Tapsell was speculated as a potential candidate. Tapsell unsuccessfully contested the East Coast electorate in the 2020 election. On 31 March, she said she would not run. Waipā District Councillor Susan O'Regan, daughter of former National MP and Tauranga candidate Katherine O'Regan, ruled out a bid on 7 April. Former Tauranga City Councillor Kevin Clout said that he was "seriously considering" putting his hand up for the National candidacy. Tauranga Business Chamber CEO and former City Councillor Matt Cowley announced on 13 April that he would seek the National Party's nomination for the election. On 29 April, the top four National candidates were announced as Clout, Cowley, Sam Uffindell, and Tom Rutherford. Uffindell was selected on 1 May.

Minister of Internal Affairs and Women Jan Tinetti, who contested the electorate at the 2017 and 2020 elections, put her name forward for the Labour candidacy. and was confirmed as their candidate on 6 April.

Former Deputy Prime Minister, Tauranga MP and New Zealand First leader Winston Peters has been speculated to run for the seat. When asked about potentially running, he replied that it was a "fascinating question", however later stated that he hasn't "had a chance to absorb all that" and doesn't have anything to say at the moment. On 17 May, he announced that neither he nor his party would stand a candidate in the by-election.

The ACT party board would hold a meeting on the by-election, revealed ACT Leader David Seymour. Cameron Luxton, the previous ACT candidate for the electorate intends to put his name forward for the election. Luxton was confirmed as the ACT candidate on 7 April 2022.

Peter Wakeman, a perennial candidate who most often stands in Canterbury and who came third in the 1993 Tauranga by-election with 1.5% of the vote, has said he would stand as an independent candidate.

Former National MP Matt King stated that his newly formed DemocracyNZ party would not be ready in time to contest the election.

The New Conservative Party announced on 11 April that co-leader Helen Houghton would run for the seat. Houghton contested Christchurch East previously.

Former Tauranga City Councillor and 2019 mayoral candidate Andrew Hollis will run for the unregistered New Nation Party.

The New Zealand Outdoors Party announced on 29 March that co-leader Sue Grey would contest the election. Grey previously ran in Nelson.

The Aotearoa Legalise Cannabis Party announced on 31 March that their candidate would be Christopher Coker, who previously contested the Bay of Plenty electorate.

The Māori Party announced on 13 May that they would not contest the election for safety reasons, citing claims of threats made by residents.

=== List of candidates ===
Nominated candidates
Party	Candidate	Background
ONE	Allan Cawood	Contested Ōhāriu in 2020
Legalise Cannabis	Christopher Coker	Contested the neighbouring Bay of Plenty seat in 2020
Independent	Tony Corbett	
Independent	Gordon Dickson	Contested Selwyn for Labour in 2014
Outdoors	Sue Grey	Party co-leader who contested Nelson in 2020
New Nation	Andrew Hollis	A former Tauranga City councillor and mayoral candidate in 2019
New Conservative	Helen Houghton	Party co-leader who contested Christchurch East in 2020
Independent	Yvette Lamare	
ACT	Cameron Luxton	Contested the electorate in 2020
Labour	Jan Tinetti	List MP since 2017 who contested Tauranga in 2017 and 2020, Minister of Internal Affairs and Minister for Women since 2020
National	Sam Uffindell	A banker at Rabobank
Independent	Peter Wakeman	A perennial candidate from Canterbury who stood and finished third in Tauranga in 1993

== Campaigning ==
During the regulated period prior to election day, parties and candidates have limits on how much they may spend on election campaigning. It is illegal in New Zealand to campaign on election day itself, or within 10 metres of an advance polling booth. For the Tauranga by-election, the regulated period runs from 10 May to 17 June 2022, and every candidate contesting the by-election is permitted to spend $57,200 on campaigning during the regulated period.

== Opinion polling ==
Poll source	Date(s)	Allan Cawood	Chris Coker	Tony Corbett	Sue Grey	Andrew Hollis	Helen Houghton	Yvette Lamare	Cameron Luxton	Jan Tinetti	Sam Uffindell	Peter Wakeman	Undecided
Newshub–Reid Research	19–29 May 2022	1.9%	–	–	3.4%	3.9%	–	–	7.4%	21.9%	56.9%	–	31.4%
Q+A Kantar Public	31 May – 8 June 2022	1%	2%	0.3%	3%	3%	1%	0.9%	7%	35%	45%	0.5%	13%

== Results ==
The following table shows the final by-election results:

2022 Tauranga by-election
Notes: Blue background denotes the winner of the by-election. Pink background denotes a candidate elected from their party list prior to the by-election. Yellow background denotes the winner of the by-election, who was a list MP prior to the by-election. A ✓ or ✗ denotes status of any incumbent, win or lose respectively.
Party	Candidate	Votes	%	±%
National	Sam Uffindell	11,613	55.87	
Labour	Jan Tinetti	5,259	25.30	-13.23
ACT	Cameron Luxton	2,133	10.26	+6.29
Outdoors	Sue Grey	1,030	4.95	
New Nation	Andrew Hollis	260	1.25	
ONE	Allan Cawood	182	0.87	
Legalise Cannabis	Christopher Coker	117	0.56	
New Conservatives	Helen Houghton	103	0.49	
Independent	Yvette Lamare	22	0.10	+0.04
Independent	Peter Wakeman	20	0.09	
Independent	Tony Corbett	17	0.08	
Independent	Gordon Dickson	9	0.04	
Informal votes		19	0.09	−1.52
Majority		6,354	30.57	
Turnout		20,784	40.19	−44.45
National hold		Swing	+26.34	
