= 1885 Tauranga by-elections =

Two New Zealand by-elections

Two 1885 by-elections were held in the electorate of Tauranga to replace the sitting member in 1885, during the term of the 9th Parliament.

William Kelly stood and came second in both by-elections. He had come second for the electorate in the two previous general elections in 1881 election and 1884 election, and was finally elected in the 1887 election.

== May 1885 by-election ==
The first by–election was held on 22 May after the resignation of George Morris when he was appointed the Legislative Council, and was won by John Sheehan. After Kelly asked for a scrutiny of the votes, Sheehan's majority was reduced from 15 to 12.

1885 Tauranga by-elections
Party	Candidate	Votes	%	±%
Independent	John Sheehan	535	50.38	
Independent	William Kelly	527	49.62	
Turnout		1062		
Majority		8	0.75	

== July 1885 by-election ==
The second by–election was held on 11 July after the death of John Sheehan on 12 June, Lawrence Grace won the seat.

1885 Tauranga by-elections
Party	Candidate	Votes	%	±%
Independent	Lawrence Grace	565	51.18	
Independent	William Kelly	539	48.82	
Turnout		1104		
Majority		26	2.36	
