= Charles Macmillan =

New Zealand politician

The Honourable Charles Macmillan
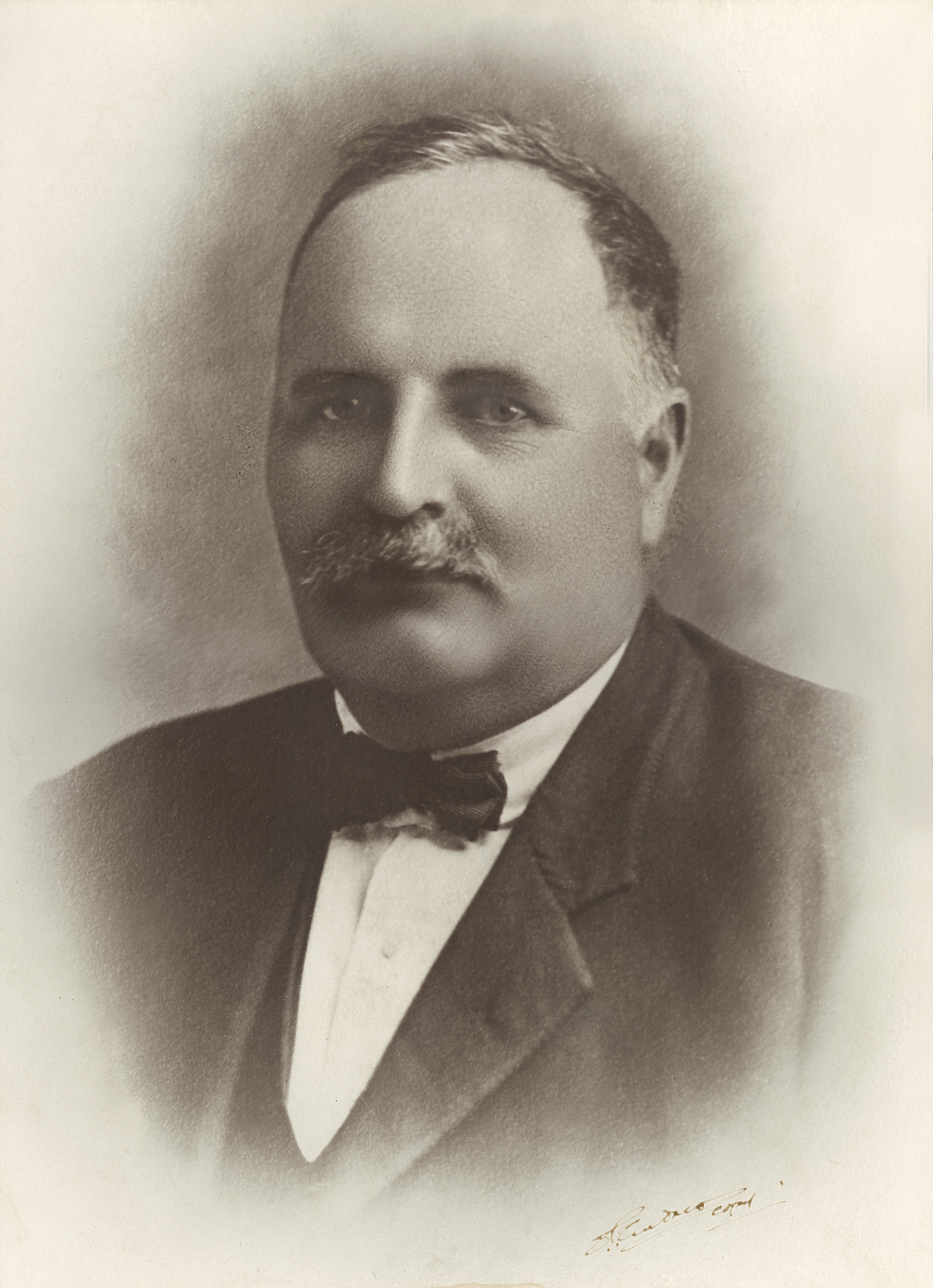

15th Mayor of Tauranga
- In office 5 May 1915 – 2 May 1917
- Preceded by: Benjamin Robbins
- Succeeded by: John Cuthbert Adams

Member of the New Zealand Parliament for Tauranga
- In office 23 March 1923 – 1 November 1935
- Preceded by: William Herries
- Succeeded by: Charles Burnett

Personal details
- Born: December 1872 Saint Croix, Danish West Indies
- Died: 9 January 1941 (aged 69) Tauranga, New Zealand
- Party: Reform

Charles Edward de la Barca Macmillan (December 1872 – 9 January 1941) was a New Zealand politician. He was Mayor of Tauranga (1915–1917) and a member of the House of Representatives (1923–1935).

== Early life ==
Macmillan was born in Saint Croix in the Danish West Indies in December 1872. His father, Donald Macmillan, had been a paymaster with the Royal Navy and was later a sugar planter. His mother, Maria Elise Barca, was the Baroness de la Barca, the daughter of Baron de la Barca. Following an uprising by workers in 1879, the Macmillans left Saint Croix.

Macmillan came to New Zealand with his parents and two siblings on the May Queen in 1881. They were part of the George Vesey Stewart Special Settlement to Te Puke, however his father wanted to be closer to the sea and thus bought land at Katikati.

In 1900, he married Ethel Latham. They moved to Tauranga in 1908.

== Political career ==
New Zealand Parliament
Years	Term	Electorate	Party
1923–1925	21st	Tauranga	Reform
1925–1928	22nd	Tauranga	Reform
1928–1931	23rd	Tauranga	Reform
1931–1935	24th	Tauranga	Reform

Macmillan was the 15th Mayor of Tauranga and served from 1915 to 1917. In the 1915 mayoral election, he defeated John Cuthbert Adams. In the 1917 mayoral election, Adams narrowly defeated Macmillan (by 292 to 276 votes).

Standing for the Reform Party, he won the Tauranga electorate in the 1923 by-election after the death of William Herries, and held it to 1935 when he was defeated by the Labour candidate, Charles Burnett. He was a cabinet minister in the United–Reform Coalition government (Minister of Agriculture and Minister of Mines from 13 February 1932 to 6 December 1935). He was subsequently granted the right to retain the title of "Honourable", having served more than three years as a member of the Executive Council. In 1935, he was awarded the King George V Silver Jubilee Medal.

== Death ==
Macmillan died in Tauranga on 9 January 1941. He was survived by his wife, his son, two daughters, and two sisters.

== Notes ==
New Zealand Parliament
Preceded by William Herries	Member of Parliament for Tauranga; 1923–1935	Succeeded by Charles Burnett
