= Lawrence Grace =

New Zealand politician

New Zealand Parliament
Years	Term	Electorate	Party
1885–1887	9th	Tauranga	Independent

Lawrence Marshall Grace (16 April 1854 – 10 January 1934) was a 19th-century Member of Parliament from the Bay of Plenty region of New Zealand.

He represented the Tauranga electorate from 1885 to 1887, when he retired.

He was the son of missionary Thomas Grace and Agnes Fearon. Lawrence's twin brother was John Edward. In 1885 he married Te Kahui Te Heuheu, daughter of Ngāti Tuwharetoa paramount chief Te Heuheu Tūkino IV, and sister of Tureiti Te Heuheu Tukino V. They had 12 children. Their eldest daughter, Bessie Te Wenerau Grace, was the first Māori woman to earn a degree from a university. His son, Hāmi Grace, was a New Zealand cricketer.

As an MP and son-in-law of Te Heuheu Tūkino IV, Grace was involved in the negotiations to establish Tongariro National Park.

New Zealand Parliament
Preceded by John Sheehan	Member of Parliament for Tauranga; 1885–1887	Succeeded by William Kelly
