= Sam Uffindell =

New Zealand politician (born 1983)

Sam Uffindell MP
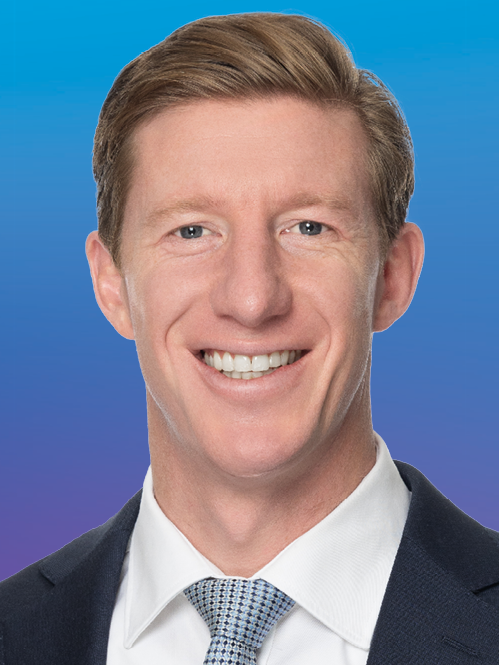
- Uffindell in 2023

Member of the New Zealand Parliament for Tauranga
- Incumbent
- Assumed office 18 June 2022
- Preceded by: Simon Bridges
- Majority: 9,370

Personal details
- Born: September 1983 (age 43) Auckland, New Zealand
- Party: National (since 2008)
- Spouse: Julia (m. 2015)
- Children: 3
- Education: University of Otago; University of New South Wales

Samuel Julian Uffindell (born September 1983) is a New Zealand politician and former international banking executive. He has been a Member of Parliament for Tauranga, representing the National Party, since winning a by-election in June 2022.

Uffindell was asked to leave from a high school for participating in a violent attack on a younger student. This attack was made public in 2022, after his election to Parliament. After this, and another accusation about Uffindell's behaviour while at university, the party temporarily stood him down from its caucus. The party commissioned an independent investigation; while it was not made public, the party concluded that the allegations from his university time were not as publicly reported and reinstated him to the caucus.

== Early life ==
Uffindell was born in Auckland in September 1983. His father was a computer company entrepreneur (UCC, a Dell reseller) and his mother was later an English lecturer.

He attended King's College, but at age sixteen was asked to leave after participating in a violent attack on a younger student. The victim, who was 13, suffered severe bruising and trauma. Police were not involved. After the matter came to light in 2022, Uffindell said he could not recall if he and the other attackers used wooden bed legs as a weapon, but could not rule it out. He later acknowledged the attack, saying he was “a thug”.

Uffindell finished his schooling at St Paul's Collegiate School in Hamilton. At this school, he was suspended for three days for leaving the property without permission.

He earned a Bachelor of Arts in Political Studies and a Bachelor of Commerce in Management at the University of Otago. While at university, he and his flatmates competed in an online competition for Dunedin's filthiest flat, and city health inspectors visited three times. After university, he worked in banking for ten years in Sydney and in Singapore, including working in financial crime at Westpac and becoming a vice president at Deutsche Bank. He gained a Master of International Law and International Relations from the University of New South Wales. Uffindell returned to New Zealand in 2020 following the COVID-19 pandemic. As of early 2022 he was the head of financial economic crime for Rabobank New Zealand, and was a partner in his wife's fertiliser supply business.

== Political career ==
New Zealand Parliament
Years	Term	Electorate		Party
2022–2023	53rd	Tauranga		National
2023–2026	54th	Tauranga	57	National
2026–present	55th	Tauranga	50	National

=== Election to parliament ===
Uffindell has been a member of the National Party since 2008. In 2021, he became the Papamoa Branch chair and the Bay of Plenty deputy electorate chair of the party. He put his name forward for the National candidacy in the 2022 Tauranga by-election following the resignation of Simon Bridges in March 2022, and was officially announced as their candidate on 1 May. Uffindell was a clear favourite for the election; Labour had not won the Tauranga electorate seat since 1935 and New Zealand First, the only party other than National to hold Tauranga since then, not standing a candidate. Uffindell's opponents in the by-election included sitting Labour List MP and cabinet minister Jan Tinetti and ACT New Zealand candidate Cameron Luxton.

The 2022 by-election gave Uffindell an outright majority of 56%. He received 11,613 votes to Tinetti's 5,259 and Luxton's 2,133. He was sworn in on 2 August 2022 and gave his maiden speech that day.

=== Political positions ===
After the by-election, Uffindell announced that improving Tauranga's roads and tackling gang crime in the city would be his top priorities in parliament. He also announced that he planned to lodge a member's bill which would make participation in gang convoys a finable offence.

Before entering parliament, Uffindell promoted organic fertiliser as a useful offset for the adverse effects of climate change, and as a way for farmers to respond to levies or caps on synthetic nitrogen fertiliser.

A few months after he entered parliament, Uffindell was appointed by the National Party as its associate spokesperson for research, science, and innovation, and associate for economic and regional development.

=== Investigation into bullying ===
On 9 August 2022, Uffindell's attack on a 13-year-old student when he was 16 was made public. That day, Uffindell said, "It was the last day of the year and we were just being silly and playing up... we got carried away and we did what we did." School representatives confirmed that it had been an "open and shut case", and Uffindell confirmed that it was the worst of several acts of violence he committed while at high school. Uffindell offered the victim an apology in 2021, 22 years after the attack, and nine months before he publicly announced his political aspirations. Leader of the National Party Christopher Luxon said he had not been aware of Uffindell's assault on the boy until the day before, stating "He has my backing and he has my support but clearly he needs to be able to build back trust with the voters in Tauranga, and make sure that he is ... demonstrating as we go into the next election – that he's a person of good character".

Later on 9 August, allegations of a separate bullying incident were made public. A woman who shared a flat with Uffindell in 2003 alleged Uffindell was a bully who once pounded on her bedroom door, screaming obscenities, until she fled through her window. Uffindell denied these bullying allegations but did say he "enjoyed a student lifestyle", including drinking alcohol and smoking cannabis. He rejected accusations that he engaged in behaviour that was intimidatory or bullying. On 11 August, it was reported that Uffindell's Dunedin flat, when he was at Otago University, was one of the filthiest in the city and that women's underwear had hung on a wall, apparently as trophies. National Party deputy leader Nicola Willis said the photo of the "trophy" rack made her feel "pretty yuck."

Uffindell was stood down from the party's caucus from 9 August to 19 September while these allegations were investigated. The investigation, conducted by Maria Dew KC, was originally intended to take two weeks, but took six. The National Party announced the results the day of the Queen's funeral, saying that Dew's report found that while the attack at King's College was substantiated, the other allegations against Uffindell about his behaviour as a university student towards a female flatmate in Dunedin were not as reported; there were differing accounts and the allegations could not be substantiated. Uffindell was reinstated into the party caucus.

National Party president Sylvia Wood said that neither the report, the investigation's terms of reference, nor the executive summary would be released to the National Party MPs or to the public; Luxon stated that he could be trusted to represent the findings. Only Wood, Luxon and Uffindell saw the report; deputy party leader Nicola Willis was excluded from the conversations and decisions about what conclusion would ultimately be presented to caucus. The former flatmate who had accused him of bullying, and her father, responded by saying they were happy for a redacted form of the report to be published.

=== 2023 election ===
For the 2023 general election, National placed Uffindell 57th on its party list. Stuff reporter Glenn McConnell described this as a "big drop" but noted he was standing in the "winnable electorate" of Tauranga.

The National Party media team "blocked interview requests" for him during the campaign, after he proudly stated that he did his family’s grocery shopping once a month "to give his wife a break". Implications in the speech that it was a woman’s job to do chores were mocked online and satirised.

In the 2023 election, the Tauranga electorate gave Uffindell 9,370 votes more than Labour's candidate Jan Tinetti.

=== Second term, 2023–present ===
In March 2025, Uffindell introduced a member's bill with the stated goal of preserving equal suffrage in both local and central governments. Uffindell said: "I hear a lot of concern from members of the community that councils, like Tauranga City Council, want to move away from equal suffrage and give special rights and voting power to people based on ethnicity. My response to that is we are all Kiwis; we should all have equal rights and responsibilities." Ngāi Te Rangi chief executive Paora Stanley and Te Rangapū Mana Whenua o Tauranga Moana chair Matire Duncan criticised the bill, claiming that it ignored the disadvantages that Māori faced in political representation in both local and central governments.

During the 2026 New Zealand general election, Uffindell contested Tauranga for National. He was ranked 50th on the National Party list. Based on preliminary results, Uffindell retained Tauranga by a landslide margin of 10,274 votes on 7 November 2026.

== Personal life ==
Uffindell met his wife Julia at the University of Otago. They married in Tauranga in 2015 and have three children.

Together they have invested in the business New Zealand Humates, founded in 2006 to import manufacture and supply a coal-based fertiliser. The Uffindells have a majority shareholding in the New Zealand Carbon Company Ltd.
