= George Walsh (New Zealand politician) =

New Zealand politician (1899–1979)

George Walsh OBE
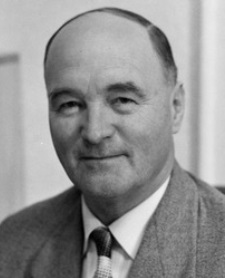

Member of the New Zealand Parliament for Tauranga
- In office 1 September 1951 – 25 November 1972
- Preceded by: Frederick Doidge
- Succeeded by: Keith Allen

Personal details
- Born: 22 November 1899 Foxton, New Zealand
- Died: 15 May 1979 (aged 79)
- Party: National
- Occupation: Farmer

George Augustus Walsh OBE (22 November 1899 – 15 May 1979) was a New Zealand politician of the National Party.

== Biography ==
New Zealand Parliament
Years	Term	Electorate	Party
1951–1954	30th	Tauranga	National
1954–1957	31st	Tauranga	National
1957–1960	32nd	Tauranga	National
1960–1963	33rd	Tauranga	National
1963–1966	34th	Tauranga	National
1966–1969	35th	Tauranga	National
1969–1972	36th	Tauranga	National

He was the oldest of six children of Gemima Howan and Augustus Walsh, who got married at Foxton around 1894. He was educated at Foxton Primary School, Palmerston North Boys' High School and Wellington Technical College. He then became a farmer in Waikato and became involved with Federated Farmers. He was chairman of the meat and wool section and also on the executive of Federated Farmers from 1941 to 1957.

He joined the National Party and was on the party's dominion council and executive and Waikato divisional chairman from 1946 to 1951 before being selected as a parliamentary candidate. He represented the Tauranga electorate from the 1951 election to 1972, when he retired. At the 17 October 1962 meeting of the New Zealand Parliament's External Affairs Select Committee, Walsh was elected to chair the committee, on the motion of Defence Minister, Dean Eyre.

== Honours and awards ==
In 1953, Walsh was awarded the Queen Elizabeth II Coronation Medal. He was appointed an Officier of the Order of the British Empire, for services to politics, in the 1973 New Year Honours.

== Notes ==
New Zealand Parliament
Preceded by Frederick Doidge	Member of Parliament for Tauranga; 1951–1972	Succeeded by Keith Allen
