= 1923 Tauranga by-election =

New Zealand by-election

- 28 March 1923
- Turnout: 7,630 (85.53%)
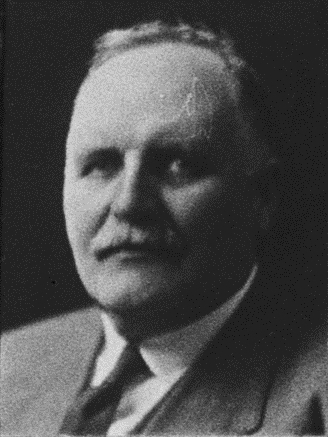

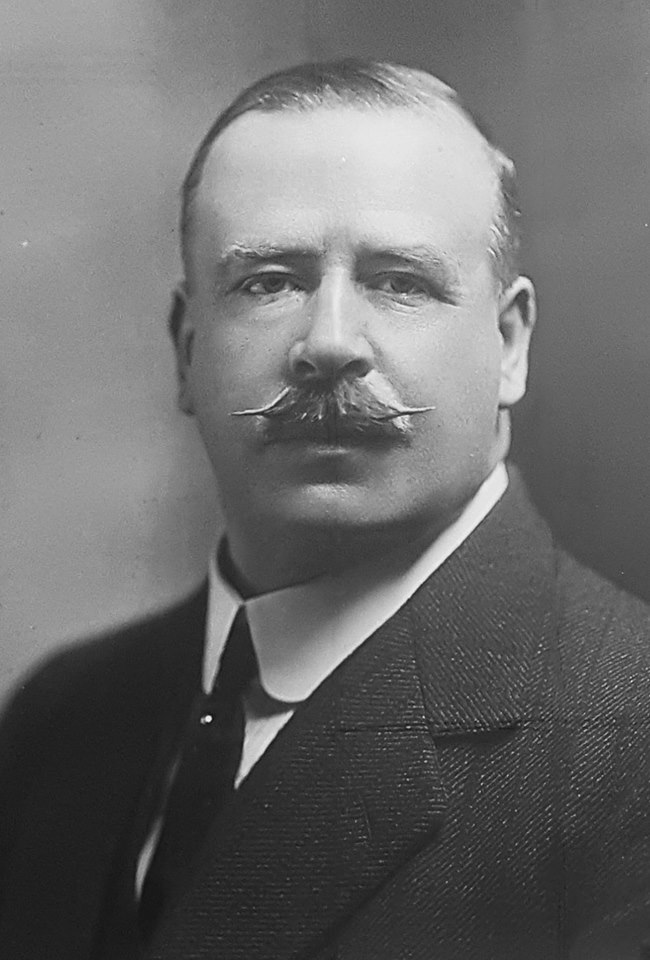
Candidate	Charles Macmillan	Sir Joseph Ward
Party	Reform	Liberal
Popular vote	4,360	3,235
Percentage	57.41	42.59
Member before election
William Herries
Reform
Elected Member
Charles Macmillan
Reform

The Tauranga by-election of 1923 was a by-election during the 21st New Zealand Parliament in the Tauranga electorate. The seat became vacant due to the death of the sitting Member, William Herries. The election was held on 28 March 1923 and won by Charles Macmillan, who defeated the former prime minister Joseph Ward.

== Background ==
Two candidates contested the seat. The first was Charles Macmillan, a former Mayor of Tauranga (1915–1917. Macmillan represented the Reform Party and was put forward by the party to succeed Herries. The other candidate was Sir Joseph Ward, a former Liberal party Prime Minister.

The Labour Party took a keen interest in the by-election. Leader Harry Holland was fearful that Ward's return to Parliament might result in a revival of the Liberals, delaying Labour's rise as the main left-wing party. As a result, he sought to stand a candidate to split the anti-Reform vote. He was overruled however, by the party executive citing the lack of any established branches within the electorate and the possibility of a poor showing by the candidate damaging party morale and credibility.

== Result ==
Macmillan won the by-election; Ward's defeat was humiliating to him.

1923 Tauranga by-election
Party	Candidate	Votes	%	±%
Reform	Charles Macmillan	4,360	57.41	
Liberal	Sir Joseph Ward	3,235	42.59	
Informal votes		35	0.46	
Majority		1,125	14.81	
Turnout		7,630	85.53	
Registered electors		8,921		
Reform hold		Swing		

Macmillan remained as Tauranga's representative until his defeat at the 1935 election. Ward was thought to be a spent force, but he was returned to Parliament again in the 1925 election, and then went on to become Prime Minister again in 1928. He retired in 1930, and died soon after.
