= Jan Tinetti =

New Zealand politician

The Honourable Jan Tinetti MP
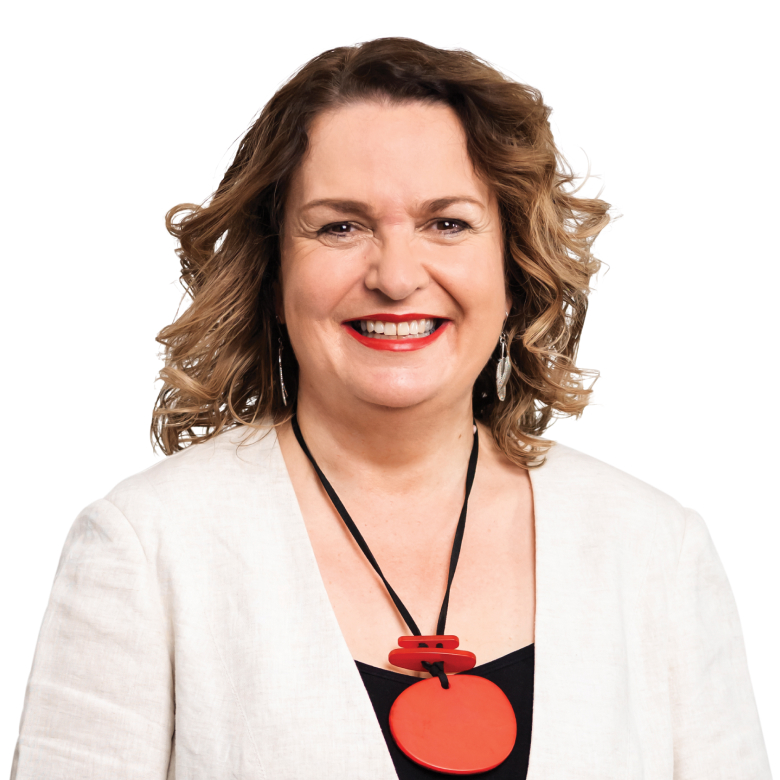
- Tinetti in 2023

48th Minister of Education
- In office 1 February 2023 – 27 November 2023
- Prime Minister: Chris Hipkins
- Preceded by: Chris Hipkins
- Succeeded by: Erica Stanford

36th Minister of Internal Affairs
- In office 6 November 2020 – 1 February 2023
- Prime Minister: Jacinda Ardern; Chris Hipkins
- Preceded by: Tracey Martin
- Succeeded by: Barbara Edmonds

16th Minister for Women
- In office 6 November 2020 – 27 November 2023
- Prime Minister: Jacinda Ardern; Chris Hipkins
- Preceded by: Julie Anne Genter
- Succeeded by: Nicola Grigg

Member of the New Zealand Parliament for Labour party list
- Incumbent
- Assumed office 23 September 2017

Personal details
- Born: Janette Rose Tinetti; 1968 (age 57–58) Hokitika, New Zealand
- Party: Labour
- Spouse: David Merton
- Relations: Don Merton (father-in-law)
- Children: 2
- Profession: School principal

Janette Rose Tinetti (born 1968) is a New Zealand politician and a Member of Parliament in the House of Representatives for the Labour Party.

== Personal life ==
Tinetti was born in Hokitika on the West Coast of the South Island, the youngest of six children. When she was 11 months old, her family moved to Templeton, just outside Christchurch, when her father Peter Tinetti became secretary of Templeton Hospital and Training School, an institution for people with intellectual disabilities. The family lived in the only staff house, in the middle of the institution, which is where Tinetti grew up. She received her secondary school education at Villa Maria College in Christchurch. She then studied at the Christchurch College of Education, from where she obtained a diploma in teaching in 1990. She became a primary school teacher and union member, teaching in Southland, Greymouth and Tauranga, and spent 20 years as a primary school principal. She graduated from the University of Canterbury with a Postgraduate Diploma in Education in 2013 and a Master of Education in 2016. She was the principal of Merivale School in Tauranga and has been on the national executive of the New Zealand Educational Institute. She is married to David Merton, whose father Don Merton was a noted conservationist, and the couple have two children. In 2019, she was diagnosed with breast cancer, for which she had surgery, but did not need chemotherapy or radiation treatment.

== Political career ==
New Zealand Parliament
Years	Term	Electorate	List	Party
2017–2020	52nd	List	15	Labour
2020–2023	53rd	List	32	Labour
2023–2026	54th	List	6	Labour
2026–present	55th	List	15	Labour

=== In Government, 2017–2023 ===
Tinetti stood for Labour in the Tauranga electorate in the 2017 election and was placed 15 on Labour's party list for that election. She entered parliament via the party list, after coming second in the electorate vote, with the incumbent the National Party's Simon Bridges preferred by a 11,252-vote margin.

She contested Tauranga again in the 2020 general election and was 32nd on the 2020 Labour party list. She was elected from the party list, with the electorate giving Bridges 1,856 more votes.

In the Cabinet formed after the 2020 election, Tinetti was appointed Minister of Internal Affairs, Minister for Women and Associate Minister of Education.

==== 2022 Tauranga by-election ====
Tinetti put her name forward for the Labour candidacy in the 2022 Tauranga by-election, after Bridges resigned from parliament, and was confirmed as the candidate on 6 April. The electorate chose the National Party candidate Sam Uffindell.

==== Minister of Education, 2023 ====
In a cabinet reshuffle by new Prime Minister Chris Hipkins on 31 January 2023, Tinetti was promoted to the number six position in Cabinet, becoming the Minister of Education and Minister for Child Poverty Reduction, while retaining her role as Minister for Women.

On 30 May 2023, Tinetti was referred by Speaker Adrian Rurawhe to Parliament's Privileges Committee after she delayed correcting a false statement in February 2023 that she had no responsibility for the release of school attendance data. Tinetti was subsequently informed by a staff member about the error but had failed to correct the record until 2 May 2023. Tinnetti claimed that she did not know that she needed to correct the record until Rurawhe raised the matter in a letter. In response, Hipkins stated that he still had confidence in Tinetti as Education Minister and would not relieve her off her ministerial portfolio while she was investigated by the Privileges Committee. On 31 May, Newshub reported that the Prime Minister's staff were aware that the Education Minister's office had been delaying the release of official school attendance data.

On 8 June, Tinetti appeared before the Privileges Committee. She expressed regret for misleading Parliament regarding truancy statistics. National Party MP Michael Woodhouse claimed that Tinetti's parliamentary staff were implicated in deciding when the information was released. Woodhouse subsequently apologised for describing Tinetti as a "good girl" during the committee hearing.

On 29 June 2023 the Privileges Committee released its report into the delay. The committee found that Tinetti had not intentionally misled Parliament, but said she had acted with a "high degree of negligence". The committee said Tinetti should formally apologise to the House.

=== In opposition, 2023–present ===
In the 2023 New Zealand general election, the Tauranga electorate preferred Sam Uffindell by a margin of 9,370 votes. Following the 2023 election, Tinetti expressed relief that a "weight had been lifted" from her. Tinetti was subsequently re-elected to Parliament on the Labour Party list.

On 30 November 2023, Tinetti assumed the education and women portfolios in the Shadow Cabinet of Chris Hipkins.

On 5 December 2023, Tinetti was granted retention of the title The Honourable, in recognition of her term as a member of the Executive Council.

On 7 March 2025, Tinetti lost the education and women portfolios but gained the workplace relations and safety, social investment, early childhood and education and childhood poverty reduction portfolios.

On 20 November 2025, Tinetti announced her selection to stand as Labour's candidate for the Tauranga electorate during the 2026 New Zealand election. She was ranked 15th on the Labour Party list. Based on preliminary results, Tinetti came second place in the Tauranga electorate with 8,843 votes on 7 November 2026. She was re-elected to Parliament on the Labour Party list.

Political offices
Preceded by Tracey Martin	Minister of Internal Affairs; 2020–2023	Succeeded by Barbara Edmonds
Preceded by Julie Anne Genter	Minister for Women; 2020–2023	Succeeded by Nicola Grigg
Preceded by Chris Hipkins	Minister of Education; 2023	Succeeded by Erica Stanford
