= Frederick Doidge =

New Zealand politician and journalist (1884–1954)

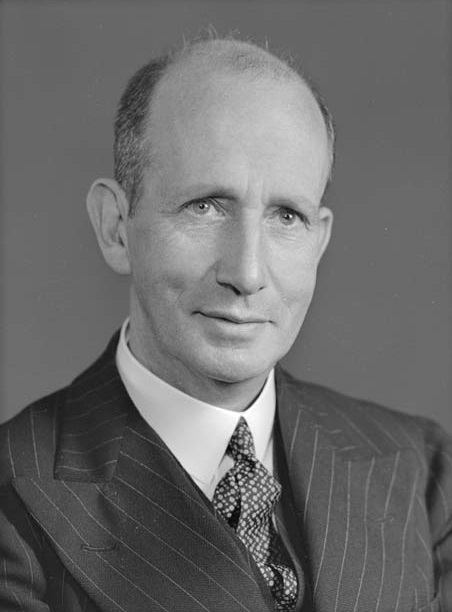
Doidge circa 1940.

Sir Frederick Widdowson Doidge KCMG (26 February 1884 – 26 May 1954) was a journalist in New Zealand and England, then a National Party member in the New Zealand House of Representatives.

== Biography ==
=== Early life and career ===
Doidge was born in Cootamundra, New South Wales, Australia. His father, Edwin Doidge, was a journalist in Thames, New Zealand, and founded the Cootamundra Liberal in August 1882 in competition with the Cootamundra Herald. Frederick Doidge received his training as a journalist from his father. Doidge came to New Zealand in 1902. During his time as a journalist, he founded and served as the first president of the New Zealand Journalists' Association.

=== Political career ===
New Zealand Parliament
Years	Term	Electorate	Party
1938–1943	26th	Tauranga	National
1943–1946	27th	Tauranga	National
1946–1949	28th	Tauranga	National
1949–1951	29th	Tauranga	National

In the 1935 election, Doidge ran as an independent in the Rotorua electorate after having had a brief encounter with the anti-Labour New Zealand Democrat Party. Of the four candidates, he came second after Labour's Alexander Moncur. The next year he ran as the new National Party's candidate in the 1936 Manukau by-election, becoming the first National candidate to run for election in history. He was defeated by Labour candidate Arthur Osborne.

Doidge then represented the electorate of Tauranga for National from 1938 to 1951, when he retired.

He served as both Minister of External Affairs and Minister of Island Territories from 1950 to 1951 in the First National Government of New Zealand. Later, Doidge became New Zealand's High Commissioner to the United Kingdom from 1951 until his death. He was appointed a Knight Commander of the Order of St Michael and St George in the 1953 New Year Honours, and awarded the Queen Elizabeth II Coronation Medal.

=== Political views ===
Doidge was known as one of the most conservative New Zealand politicians throughout his career. He openly criticized Bill Airey for his teachings, questioning why the government was funding Airey's lectures.

=== Personal life and death ===
Doidge died in London on 26 May 1954.

New Zealand Parliament
Preceded by Charles Burnett	Member of Parliament for Tauranga; 1938–1951	Succeeded by George Walsh
Diplomatic posts
Preceded by Bill Jordan	High Commissioner of New Zealand to the United Kingdom; 1951–1954	Succeeded by Clifton Webb
