= John Sheehan (New Zealand politician) =

New Zealand politician

The Honourable John Sheehan
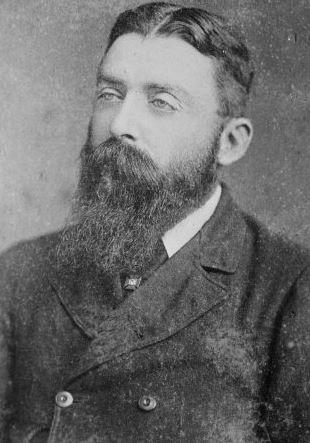
- Sheehan c. 1884

5th Minister of Justice
- In office 13 October 1877 – 8 October 1879
- Prime Minister: George Grey
- Preceded by: Charles Bowen
- Succeeded by: William Rolleston

Personal details
- Born: 5 July 1844 Auckland, New Zealand
- Died: 12 June 1885 (aged 40) Petane, New Zealand
- Spouse: Lucy Caroline Young

John Sheehan (5 July 1844 – 12 June 1885) was a 19th-century New Zealand politician. He was the first New Zealand-born Member of Parliament elected by a general electorate (rather than a Māori electorate) and he was the first New Zealand-born person to hold cabinet rank.

== Biography ==
=== Early life and career ===
Sheehan was born in Auckland in 1844. He was educated at St Peter's School under the guidance of his teacher, Richard O'Sullivan and where he knew another later Cabinet Minister, Joseph Tole.

=== Political career ===
New Zealand Parliament
Years	Term	Electorate	Party
1872–1875	5th	Rodney	Independent
1876–1879	6th	Rodney	Independent
1879–1881	7th	Thames	Independent
1881–1884	8th	Thames	Independent
1885	9th	Tauranga	Independent

He was the Minister of Justice and the Minister of Māori Affairs from 1877 to 1879. He represented several North Island electorates: Rodney from 1872 to 1879, then Thames from 1879 to 1884, when he was defeated (for Napier by John Davies Ormond). He then represented Tauranga from a by-election on 22 May 1885 until he died shortly after on 12 June.

A fluent Māori speaker and a lawyer, he is noted for his efforts with the Repudiation Movement in the 1870s to solve land issues on behalf of Hawkes Bay Māori chiefs who claimed large European land holders, such as Donald McLean, had acquired land improperly. The Repudiation Movement failed but Sheehan gained a positive reputation with Māori leaders. In 1877 he became Native Minister in the Grey Government. He tried to negotiate land deals in Taranaki with iwi leaders and, in respect of the King Country, with King Tawhaio, but failed. However, during these meetings he discovered that Rewi Maniapoto wanted to sell land and negotiated land sales to Europeans in the King Country that the government hoped would speed up assimilation. Sheehan negotiated unsuccessfully with Te Whiti whose base of Parihaka was destroyed by the Armed Constabulary in November 1881 after Sheehan had ceased to hold ministerial office (in 1879). Sheehan was also active in promoting secular education and widening the franchise but he wanted only one system of Parliamentary representation, the abolition of separate Māori seats and the end of plural voting. He was one of the first ministers to advocate breaking up of the large runholder monopolies which he believed had created a social elite at the expense of the normal citizen.

=== Death ===
Sheehan died of pneumonia and cirrhosis of the liver in Petane (now Bay View) on 12 June 1885 aged 40 years. In 1890, his widow, Lucy Caroline Sheehan, married Herbert Samuel Wardell, previously a resident magistrate of Wellington. She was given away by John Nathaniel Wilson.

== Notes ==
New Zealand Parliament
Preceded by William Rowe	Member of Parliament for Thames; 1879–1884; Served alongside: George Grey	Succeeded by William Fraser
Preceded by George Morris	Member of Parliament for Tauranga; 1885	Succeeded by Lawrence Grace
Political offices
Preceded by Charles Bowen	Minister of Justice; 1877–1879	Succeeded by William Rolleston
