= Fordell, New Zealand =

Rural community in Manawatū-Whanganui, New Zealand

Fordell
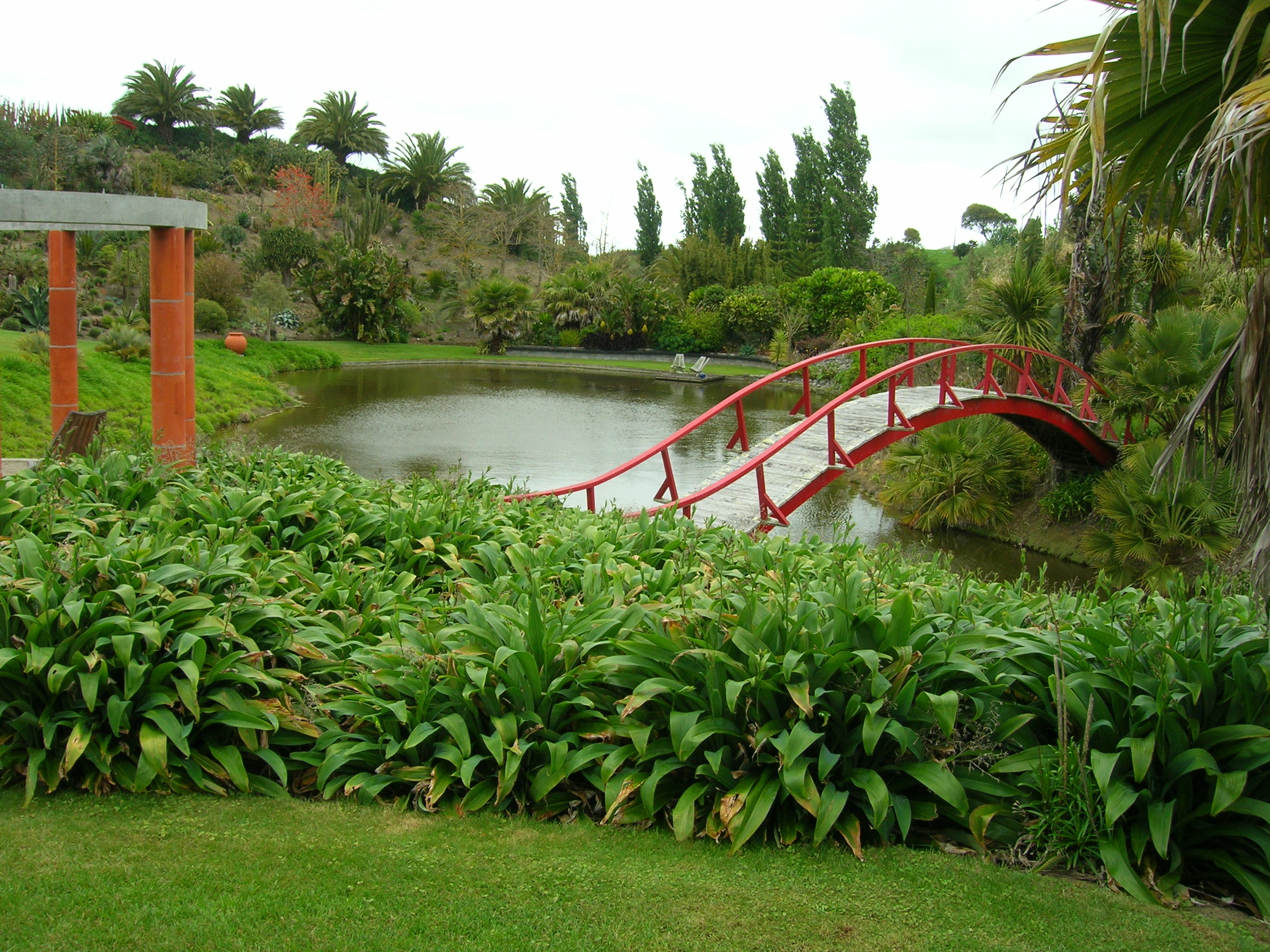
- Paloma Gardens
- Interactive map of Fordell
- Coordinates: 39.960543°S 175.204711°E
- Country: New Zealand
- Region: Manawatū-Whanganui
- District: Whanganui District
- Community: Whanganui Rural Community
- Electorates: Whanganui; Te Tai Hauāuru (Māori)

Government
  - Territorial Authority: Whanganui District Council
  - Regional council: Horizons Regional Council
  - Mayor of Whanganui: Andrew Tripe
  - Whanganui MP: Carl Bates
  - Te Tai Hauāuru MP: Debbie Ngarewa-Packer

Area
  - Total: 7.32 km^{2} (2.83 sq mi)

Population (2023 Census)
  - Total: 168
  - Density: 23.0/km^{2} (59.4/sq mi)

Fordell is a rural community in the Whanganui District and Manawatū-Whanganui region of New Zealand's North Island. It is on the Marton-New Plymouth railway line east of Kaitoke and north of Whangaehu.

Paloma Gardens in Fordell is a private garden rated by the New Zealand Gardens Trust as "Significant". The American horror film X, directed by Ti West and starring Mia Goth, was filmed in the area.

== Demographics ==
Fordell locality covers 7.32 km^{2} (2.83 sq mi). It is part of the larger Kaitoke-Fordell statistical area.

Historical population for Fordell locality
Year	Pop.	±% p.a.
2006	141	—
2013	147	+0.60%
2018	138	−1.26%
2023	168	+4.01%

Fordell had a population of 168 in the 2023 New Zealand census, an increase of 30 people (21.7%) since the 2018 census, and an increase of 21 people (14.3%) since the 2013 census. There were 81 males and 87 females in 63 dwellings. 1.8% of people identified as LGBTIQ+. The median age was 45.3 years (compared with 38.1 years nationally). There were 36 people (21.4%) aged under 15 years, 24 (14.3%) aged 15 to 29, 75 (44.6%) aged 30 to 64, and 39 (23.2%) aged 65 or older.

People could identify as more than one ethnicity. The results were 92.9% European (Pākehā), 12.5% Māori, 7.1% Pasifika, 3.6% Asian, and 3.6% other, which includes people giving their ethnicity as "New Zealander". English was spoken by 100.0%, and Māori by 1.8%. No language could be spoken by 1.8% (e.g. too young to talk). The percentage of people born overseas was 12.5, compared with 28.8% nationally.

Religious affiliations were 44.6% Christian, and 1.8% New Age. People who answered that they had no religion were 44.6%, and 8.9% of people did not answer the census question.

Of those at least 15 years old, 27 (20.5%) people had a bachelor's or higher degree, 81 (61.4%) had a post-high school certificate or diploma, and 24 (18.2%) people exclusively held high school qualifications. The median income was $34,900, compared with $41,500 nationally. 12 people (9.1%) earned over $100,000 compared to 12.1% nationally. The employment status of those at least 15 was 63 (47.7%) full-time, 21 (15.9%) part-time, and 6 (4.5%) unemployed.

=== Kaitoke-Fordell statistical area ===
Kaitoke-Fordell statistical area covers 261.31 km^{2} (100.89 sq mi) and had an estimated population of 2,110 as of June 2025, with a population density of 8 people per km^{2}.

Historical population for Kaitoke-Fordell
Year	Pop.	±% p.a.
2006	1,398	—
2013	1,773	+3.45%
2018	1,770	−0.03%
2023	2,061	+3.09%

Kaitoke-Fordell had a population of 2,061 in the 2023 New Zealand census, an increase of 291 people (16.4%) since the 2018 census, and an increase of 288 people (16.2%) since the 2013 census. There were 1,197 males, 855 females, and 6 people of other genders in 612 dwellings. 1.7% of people identified as LGBTIQ+. The median age was 41.7 years (compared with 38.1 years nationally). There were 381 people (18.5%) aged under 15 years, 294 (14.3%) aged 15 to 29, 1,056 (51.2%) aged 30 to 64, and 327 (15.9%) aged 65 or older.

People could identify as more than one ethnicity. The results were 86.2% European (Pākehā), 21.5% Māori, 2.8% Pasifika, 2.0% Asian, and 4.1% other, which includes people giving their ethnicity as "New Zealander". English was spoken by 97.8%, Māori by 4.5%, Samoan by 0.4%, and other languages by 3.2%. No language could be spoken by 1.7% (e.g. too young to talk). New Zealand Sign Language was known by 0.9%. The percentage of people born overseas was 9.2, compared with 28.8% nationally.

Religious affiliations were 31.4% Christian, 0.4% Islam, 1.7% Māori religious beliefs, 0.3% Buddhist, 0.9% New Age, and 0.6% other religions. People who answered that they had no religion were 56.2%, and 8.6% of people did not answer the census question.

Of those at least 15 years old, 261 (15.5%) people had a bachelor's or higher degree, 1,056 (62.9%) had a post-high school certificate or diploma, and 363 (21.6%) people exclusively held high school qualifications. The median income was $32,300, compared with $41,500 nationally. 132 people (7.9%) earned over $100,000 compared to 12.1% nationally. The employment status of those at least 15 was 771 (45.9%) full-time, 258 (15.4%) part-time, and 78 (4.6%) unemployed.

== Education ==
Fordell School is a co-educational state primary school for Year 1 to 8 students, with a roll of 128 as of July 2026. It opened in 1883.

== Notable people ==
- Charles Harris Burnett, born (1875) and farmed at Fordell before becoming an MP for Tauranga
- Henry Shafto Harrison, early settler (1847), the first MP for the Wanganui electorate, first and only President of the Wanganui Jockey Club.
