= Cameron Luxton =

New Zealand politician (born 1988 or 1989)

Cameron Luxton MP
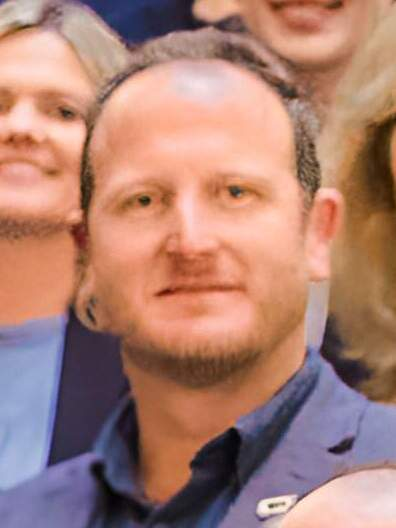
- Luxton in 2023

Member of the New Zealand Parliament for ACT party list
- Incumbent
- Assumed office 14 October 2023

Personal details
- Born: Cameron Gib Luxton; 1988 or 1989 (age 37–38)
- Party: ACT New Zealand
- Children: 2
- Occupation: Builder; farmer

Cameron Gib Luxton (born 1988 or 1989) is a New Zealand politician. He was elected to the New Zealand House of Representatives in the 2023 general election as an ACT New Zealand list Member of Parliament.

== Early life ==
Luxton was raised in the Tauranga suburb of Papamoa and attended Mount Maunganui College. He spent seven years on a dairy farm in Galatea, during which he won Modern Apprentice of the Year in Rotorua at the Dairy Industry Awards in 2013 and Bay of Plenty Dairy Trainee in 2014. He has also worked as a self-employed builder.

Luxton resides in Papamoa with his wife, Susan, and their two children.

== Political career ==
New Zealand Parliament
Years	Term	Electorate	List	Party
2023–2023	54th	List	11	ACT
2026–present	55th	List	12	ACT

Luxton contested Tauranga in the 2020 election. Originally at 16 on the ACT party list, he was bumped up to 15 after Pakuranga candidate Stephen Berry withdrew his nomination. He came fourth in Tauranga, receiving 3.97% of the vote, and his list placement was not high enough to enter parliament.

Following National MP Simon Bridges' announcement in March 2022 that he would resign, Luxton stated his intention to contest the resulting by-election. His candidacy was confirmed on 7 April. During the campaign, he likened Tauranga commission chair Anne Tolley to former French queen Marie Antoinette and stated "It's time Tauranga gave her the same treatment. The power has gone to her head, and we say off with it." He finished third in the election with 10.2% of the vote.

=== First term, 2023–2026 ===
In the 2023 general election, Luxton was placed at number 11 on the ACT party list. He also contested the electorate of Bay of Plenty, coming third place. He was elected as a list MP. After the election, Luxton was appointed the ACT spokesperson for conservation, housing, building and construction, infrastructure, local government, and transport. He was also appointed to the transport and infrastructure committee and the health committee.

On 11 April 2024, Luxton's private member's bill to remove restrictions on selling alcohol over Easter was selected for debate. The bill was first debated on 17 December 2024 and was defeated by a margin of 74 to 49 votes; with MPs being granted a conscience vote on the matter.

In mid-April 2026, Luxton introduced a member's bill seeking to ban unelected appointees on local council committees from having voting rights. In addition, ACT leader David Seymour confirmed that the party would campaign on passing Luxton's bill within the first 100 days if re-elected following the 2026 New Zealand general election. ACT Local councillor Davina Smolders had earlier clashed with Mayor of the Far North Moko Tepania for expanding the number of Māori iwi (tribal) and hapu (clan) representatives on the Far North District Council's Te Kuaka Māori Strategic Relationships Committee.

=== Second term, 2026–present ===
During the 2026 New Zealand general election, Luxton was ranked 12th place on the ACT party list and contested the Mt Maunganui electorate. On 7 November, Luxton came fifth place with 2,041 votes, based on preliminary results. He was re-elected to Parliament via the ACT party list.
