= Cootamundra Herald =

Australian periodical

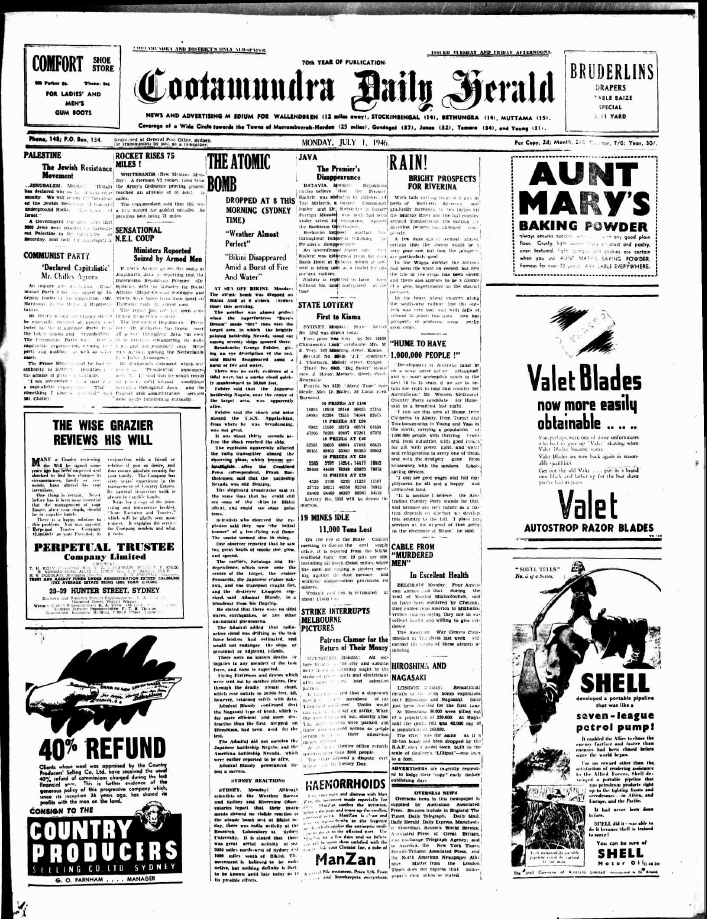
Front page of The Cootamundra Herald - Monday 1 July 1946

The Cootamundra Herald is a former printed bi-weekly newspaper now existing only on-line and containing little or no news of direct relevance to the community of Cootamundra, New South Wales, Australia. The Herald website carries syndicated non-local copy with occasional government media releases referring to local issues. Following the purchase of the masthead in 2019 by Australian Community Media, the Herald office which had existed for 144 years in the main street was closed and local staff were forced to work part-time from home. The staff resigned or were eventually sacked, and there are now no local Herald employees generating content related to the town.

Some duties of a local newspaper have been undertaken by the Twin Towns Times of Harden-Murrumburrah.

== Newspaper history ==
The Cootamundra Herald, originally subtitled Murrumburrah, Bethungra and Bland Advertiser, was founded by Thomas Campbell Brown (c. 1855 – 7 April 1936) and Frederick Pinkstone (1847 – 2 January 1922) and first published on 30 January 1877. Brown, a friend of Pinkstone for even longer than they were business partners, left for Sydney in 1883, and Pinkstone continued as editor until 1916, when he was forced to retire due to illness. He called on his son William Henry Pinkstone (died 2 March 1953) to take over the editorship which he did until the age of 75 and held the ownership until his death at 78. William Henry's son Harry Pinkstone then inherited the paper and edited it for five years before his own death at the age of 48. Harry Pinkstone's widow eventually sold the newspaper to the Bradley family in 1963. On 2 October 1990 the Bradley family sold the newspaper to Rural Press Limited which merged with Fairfax in 2007.

Fairfax sold its regional mastheads to the Nine Network in 2018, and Nine sold them to Antony Catalano's Australian Community Media in 2019.

Barry Clarke was the longest standing editor of The Cootamundra Herald, a position he held from approximately 1965-1997. He was known for his strong editorial and campaigning for the benefits of the community.

Between approximately 1946 and 1954 the newspaper issued in a daily frequency and was briefly titled Cootamundra Daily Herald.

More recently it was published twice weekly (Wednesday and Friday) both on-line and as hard copy until 17 March 2020, when the printed version was suspended, initially for three months, and then stopped altogether. Management attributed this to the "economic decline that attended the COVID-19 pandemic". However a more likely reason is that Australian Community Media could not make the paper generate sufficient profit to support head office overheads. Another printed newspaper, the Cootamundra Times, which commenced publication immediately after the last printed edition of the Herald, has consistently attracted sufficient support from advertisers to continue publication. Australian Community Media has downgraded or discontinued many other regional newspapers. Independently-owned newspapers in nearby Gundagai and Temora continued to publish throughout the pandemic, demonstrating that local ownership is a far more resilient model for newspaper publication that ownership by large chains like Fairfax and ACM.

== Competition ==
In August 1882 the Cootamundra Liberal was founded, for many years owned by Edwin Doidge, father of Frederick W. Doidge. In 1928, shortly after being renamed the Cootamundra Daily News, the paper was purchased from its proprietor, William John Bright (c. 1886 – c. 1 April 1966), by the Herald, and discontinued. The Liberal and the Herald have been confused by commentators. The week after the Herald stopped printing in March 2020, the Cootamundra Times, under local ownership and published in conjunction with the Harden-based Twin Town Times, commenced publication and has published weekly subsequently..

== Digitisation ==
The paper has been digitised as part of the Australian Newspapers Digitisation Program project of the National Library of Australia.

== See also ==
- List of newspapers in Australia
- List of newspapers in New South Wales
