= George Read (New Zealand politician) =

New Zealand politician and mariner (1814/1815–1878)

- Born: George Edward Read; 1814/1815; Mendlesham, Suffolk, England
- Died: 23 February 1878 (aged 63); Gisborne, New Zealand
- Spouse: Noko Pahipa

George Edward Read (1814/1815 – 23 February 1878) was a British mariner, trader, landowner and politician in Poverty Bay, New Zealand. Known as Captain Read, he settled in Gisborne after a career in whaling, setting up a store in what was then a small town.

== Early life ==
Read was born in Mendlesham, Suffolk, England, in either 1814 or 1815. Little is known of his early life. He came to the Pacific in the 1830s on a whaling ship, and worked on trading ships.

== Poverty Bay ==
Read first arrived in the settlement of Tūranga in 1844. By 1852, he owned a schooner, and was a prominent trader and landowner.

=== Member of Parliament ===
New Zealand Parliament
Years	Term	Electorate	Party
1876	6th	East Coast	Independent

Following the general election held on 6 January 1876, he represented the East Coast electorate until 22 August, when he was unseated on a petition.

Read died at his home in Gisborne on 23 February 1878.

New Zealand Parliament
Preceded by William Kelly	Member of Parliament for East Coast; 1876	Succeeded by George Morris
