= George Morris (New Zealand politician) =

New Zealand politician

The Honourable George Morris
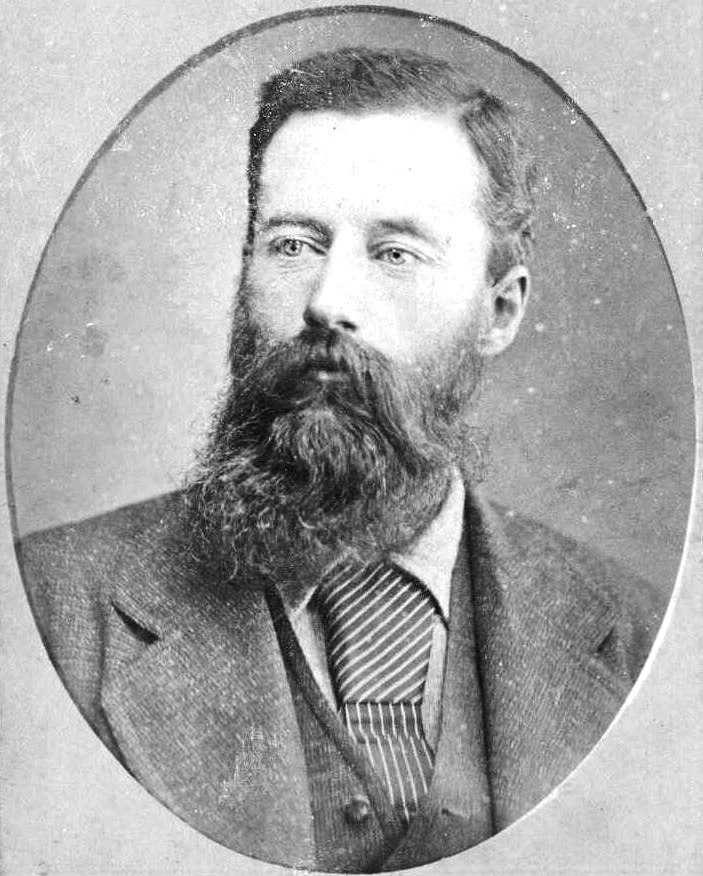

Member of the New Zealand Parliament for Tauranga
- In office 1881–1885
- Succeeded by: John Sheehan

Personal details
- Born: George Bentham Morris; 1839 Oatlands, Tasmania, Australia
- Died: 16 April 1903 (aged 63) Onehunga, New Zealand

George Bentham Morris (1839 – 16 April 1903) was a 19th-century Member of Parliament from the Gisborne and Bay of Plenty regions of New Zealand.

== Early life ==
Morris was born in Oatlands, Van Diemen's Land in 1839, the son of Susan Emma Waudby and Reverend George Sculthorpe Morris. He joined the marines after leaving school, and eventually arrived in New Zealand in 1870, settling in Auckland.

== Political career ==
New Zealand Parliament
Years	Term	Electorate	Party
1876–1879	6th	East Coast	Independent
1881–1884	8th	Tauranga	Independent
1884–1885	9th	Tauranga	Independent

Morris represented the Tauranga electorate in the Auckland Provincial Council from 12 November 1873 until the abolition of provincial government on 31 October 1876. He represented the East Coast electorate in the House of Representatives from 1876 (when he was declared elected on a petition) to 1879, when he was defeated.

The 1881 election in the newly formed Tauranga electorate was hotly contested. Four candidates were nominated: Morris; William Kelly, who had also previously represented the East Coast electorate; George Vesey Stewart, then the owner of the Bay of Plenty Times; and Henry Thomas Rowe, a surveyor and commission agent. Rowe announced his retirement from the contest on 6 December three days out from election day, urging his supporters to vote for Stewart instead. The unofficial results were released the day after the election (Saturday, 10 December) and Morris had a majority of 13 votes over Stewart, with the official declaration to be made on 12 December. This was deferred until 14 December, with Morris ahead by 10 votes. Stewart stood for the Tauranga mayoralty a few months later and was elected the town's first mayor.

He represented the Tauranga electorate until 1885, when he resigned.

He was later a member of the Legislative Council, from 15 May 1885 until his death. He died at his home in Onehunga on 16 April 1903, aged 63, as a result of tripping and sustaining a blow to his temple. He was buried at Waikaraka Cemetery, Onehunga.

== Notes ==
New Zealand Parliament
Preceded by George Read	Member of Parliament for East Coast; 1876–1879	Succeeded by Allan McDonald
New constituency	Member of Parliament for Tauranga; 1881–1885	Succeeded by John Sheehan
