= William Kelly (New Zealand politician) =

New Zealand politician (1840–1907)

The Honourable William Kelly
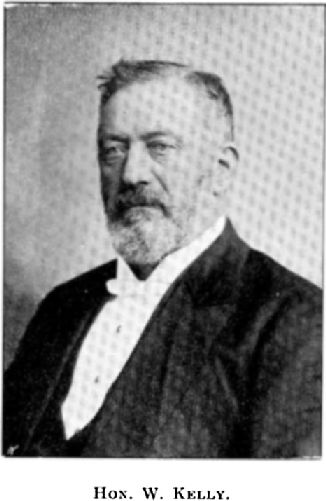

Member of the New Zealand Parliament for East Coast
- In office 1871–75
- In office 1890–93

Member of the New Zealand Parliament for Tauranga
- In office 1887–90

Member of the New Zealand Parliament for Tauranga
- In office 1893–96

Personal details
- Born: 1840 County Louth, Ireland
- Died: 19 September 1907 (aged 66) Auckland, New Zealand
- Party: Liberal Party

William Kelly (1840 – 19 September 1907) was an Irish migrant to New Zealand, and became a businessman, soldier and politician.

== Early life ==
Kelly was born in 1840 in County Louth, Ireland, and emigrated to New Zealand as a young man in 1863. In 1864 he became a contractor for the troops stationed in Auckland, then in the following year went to Ōpōtiki and set up a shipping business between Ōpōtiki and Auckland. In 1868 he became captain of the Bay of Plenty cavalry corps and fought in the New Zealand Wars.

== Political career ==
New Zealand Parliament
Years	Term	Electorate	Party
1871–1875	5th	East Coast	Independent
1887–1890	10th	Tauranga	Independent
1890–1893	11th	East Coast	Liberal
1893–1896	12th	Bay of Plenty	Liberal

He was a member of Auckland Provincial Council, representing the Pensioner Settlements (18 November 1872 – 3 October 1873) and Opotiki (18 November 1873 – 31 October 1876) electorates. In 1871, he was elected to the House of Representatives for the East Coast electorate. He held that seat until the end of the parliamentary term in 1875. The "most sensational electoral contest ever held in the East Coast" electorate was held in January 1876, when mysterious pieces of cardboard were distributed by supporters of George Read in Gisborne, which hotel bars accepted as legal tender. Read, George Morris and Kelly received 215, 206 and 185 votes, with another candidate coming a distant fourth. Morris petitioned against Read's election. A parliamentary committee of enquiry determined that Read had not broken any laws by approving the initiative, but the House of Representatives resolved that Read was to be unseated in favour of Morris, which happened later in 1876. This was the last election enquiry held by a parliamentary committee. Subsequently, these enquiries were held by the courts.

The 1881 election in the newly formed Tauranga electorate was hotly contested. Four candidates were nominated: Kelly; George Morris, who had previously represented the East Coast electorate; George Vesey Stewart, then the owner of the Bay of Plenty Times; and Henry Thomas Rowe, a surveyor and commission agent. Rowe announced his retirement from the contest on 6 December three days out from election day, urging his supporters to vote for Stewart instead. The unofficial results were released the day after the election (Saturday, 10 December) and Morris had a majority of 13 votes over Stewart, with the official declaration to be made on 12 December. This was deferred until 14 December, with Morris ahead by 10 votes. Stewart stood for the Tauranga mayoralty a few months later and was elected the town's first mayor.

After a break from politics, he was returned as an MP in 1887 for the Tauranga electorate. In the following election in 1890, he was again returned in the East Coast electorate. In 1893, he was successful in the Bay of Plenty electorate, but he was defeated there in 1896 by William Herries. In 1897 he was called to the New Zealand Legislative Council.

== Notes ==
New Zealand Parliament
New constituency	Member of Parliament for East Coast; 1871–1876; 1890–1893	Succeeded by George Read
Preceded by Alexander Creighton Arthur	Member of Parliament for East Coast; 1871–1876; 1890–1893	Vacant Constituency abolished, recreated in 1999 Title next held by Janet Mackey
Preceded by Lawrence Grace	Member of Parliament for Tauranga; 1887–1890	Vacant Constituency abolished, recreated in 1908 Title next held by William Herries
New constituency	Member of Parliament for Bay of Plenty; 1893–1896	Succeeded by William Herries
