= Thomas Grace (Archdeacon of Marlborough) =

New Zealand Anglican priest (1850–1918)

- Born: Thomas Samul Grace; 17 May 1850; At Sea
- Died: 1 April 1918 (aged 67); Blenheim, New Zealand

Thomas Samuel Grace (1850 – 1 April 1918) was an Anglican priest in the last decades of the 19th century and the opening decades of the 20th.

Grace was the son of Thomas Samuel Grace, an eminent English Anglican missionary to New Zealand. He was educated at Church of England Grammar School, Auckland and Bishopdale College; and ordained deacon in 1873, and priest in 1875. He was Domestic Chaplain to the BIshop of Nelson from 1874 to 1881; a CMS missionary at Whanganui from 1881 to 1885; Vicar of Blenheim from 1885; and Archdeacon of Marlborough from 1890.
