= Charles Burnett (politician) =

New Zealand politician

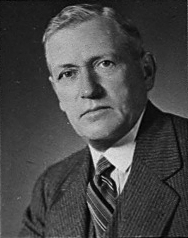
- Burnett in 1935

Member of the New Zealand Parliament for Tauranga
- In office 1935–1938
- Preceded by: Charles Macmillan
- Succeeded by: Frederick Doidge

Personal details
- Born: Charles Harris Burnett; 24 June 1875 Fordell, Wanganui, New Zealand
- Died: 7 January 1947 (aged 71) Tauranga, New Zealand
- Party: Labour
- Spouse: Helen Mary Burr (m. 1901)
- Children: 3
- Education: Wanganui Collegiate School

Charles Harris Burnett (24 June 1875 – 7 January 1947) was a New Zealand politician of the Labour Party.

== Early life and family ==
Born on his parents' farm at Fordell near Wanganui on 24 June 1875, Burnett was the son of Cornelius Burnett, a barrister and solicitor, and Lily Marion Burnett (née Harris). He was educated at Wanganui Collegiate School, and went farming when he was 16 years old, going on to farm on the property where he was born for 25 years. He was involved in the establishment of the New Zealand Farmers' Union, and was a life member of the Wanganui Agricultural Society.

On 9 October 1901, Burnett married Helen Mary Burr at Omanaia in the Hokianga, and the couple went on to have four children.

== Political career ==
New Zealand Parliament
Years	Term	Electorate	Party
1935–1938	25th	Tauranga	Labour

Burnett began his community and political involvement in the Wanganui district. He served for a number of years on the Purua Road Board, the Wanganui County Council and the Fordell school board. He was later elected as a member of the Wanganui City Countil, serving in that capacity for 13 years. He also served on the Wanganui-Rangitikei Electric Power Board, the Wanganui-Rangitikei Hospital Board, and the Wellington Land Board. In 1932, he unsuccessfully stood for election as a member of the New Zealand Dairy Board.

He represented the Tauranga electorate from 1935 to 1938, when he was defeated. He was to stand as an independent candidate for the 1941 New Zealand general election. However, the election was cancelled due to World War II.

== Later life and death ==
Burnett remained in the Tauranga district, and died there on 7 January 1947. He was buried at Tauranga Public Anglican Cemetery. His widow, Helen Burnett, died in 1964.

== Notes ==
New Zealand Parliament
Preceded by Charles Macmillan	Member of Parliament for Tauranga; 1935–1938	Succeeded by Frederick Doidge
