= George Vesey Stewart =

New Zealand farmer, coloniser and local politician

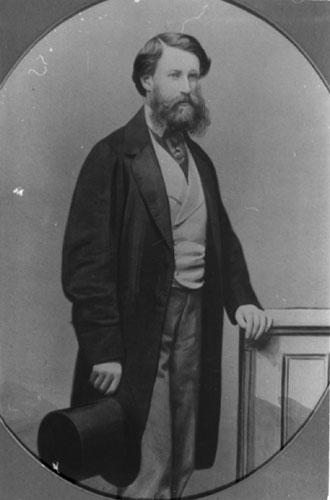

George Vesey Stewart (1832–1920) was a New Zealand farmer, coloniser and local politician. He was born in Brighton, Sussex, England in about 1832.

He was a member of the Orange Order, and recruited settlers for his colonial project in Katikati from Orange Order members in Ulster.

The 1881 election in the newly formed Tauranga electorate was hotly contested. Four candidates were nominated: George Morris, who had previously represented the East Coast electorate; Stewart, then the owner of the Bay of Plenty Times; William Kelly, who had also previously represented the East Coast electorate; and Henry Thomas Rowe, a surveyor and commission agent. Rowe announced his retirement from the contest on 6 December three days out from election day, urging his supporters to vote for Stewart instead. The unofficial results were released the day after the election (on Saturday, 10 December) and Morris had a majority of 13 votes over Stewart, with the official declaration to be made on 12 December. This was deferred until 14 December, with Morris ahead by 10 votes. Stewart stood for the Tauranga mayoralty a few months later and was elected the town's first mayor.

Stewart stood in the 1893 election in the Bay of Plenty electorate as an independent and came a distant fourth.

His brother's wife was Adela Blanche Stewart, who wrote the book My Simple Life in New Zealand.
