= Tauranga (electorate) =

- Single-member general constituency for the New Zealand House of Representatives
- Interactive map of boundaries from the 2026 election
- Formation: 1861, 1908
- Region: Bay of Plenty
- Character: Suburban
- Term: 3 years

Member for Tauranga
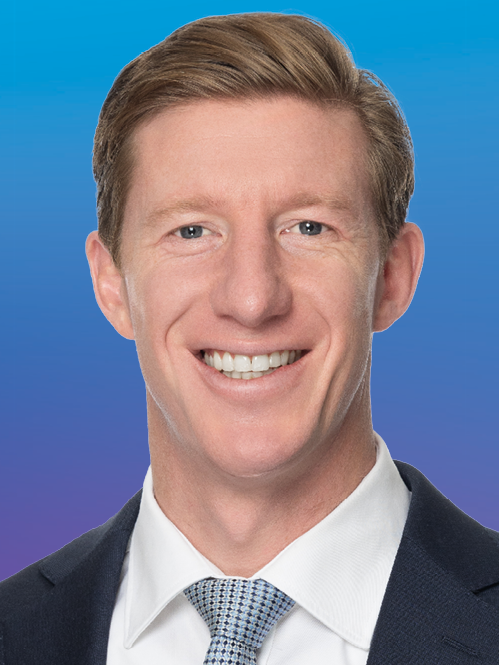
- Sam Uffindell since 18 June 2022
- Party: National
- List MPs: Jan Tinetti (Labour)
- Previous MP: Simon Bridges (National)
Party vote distribution

Tauranga is a New Zealand parliamentary electorate, returning one Member of Parliament to the New Zealand House of Representatives. The current MP for Tauranga is Sam Uffindell of the National Party, who won the seat in the 2022 Tauranga by-election, following the resignation of the previous MP, Simon Bridges of the National Party.

== Population centres ==
The previous electoral redistribution was undertaken in 1875 for the 1875–1876 election. In the six years since, New Zealand's European population had increased by 65%. In the 1881 electoral redistribution, the House of Representatives increased the number of European representatives to 91 (up from 84 since the 1875–76 election). The number of Māori electorates was held at four. The House further decided that electorates should not have more than one representative, which led to 35 new electorates being formed, including Tauranga, and two electorates that had previously been abolished to be recreated. This necessitated a major disruption to existing boundaries.

Map of boundaries at the 2020 and 2023 general elections

The electorate includes Tauranga, Mount Maunganui and Omanu, but excluding Hairini, Maungatapu, Matapihi and Welcome Bay. In the 2025 boundary review, the electorate was shifted westward, gaining the communities of Te Puna, Te Puna West and Minden while transferring Mount Maunganui and Omanu to the newly created Mt Maunganui electorate.

== History ==
Tauranga electorate was created for the 1881 election, which determined the composition of the 8th Parliament. Initially, it existed until the 1890 election and during that time, it was represented by four MPs.

The 1881 election was hotly contested. Four candidates were nominated: George Morris, who had previously represented the East Coast electorate; George Vesey Stewart, then the owner of the Bay of Plenty Times; William Kelly, who had also previously represented the East Coast electorate; and Henry Thomas Rowe, a surveyor and commission agent. Rowe announced his retirement from the contest on 6 December three days out from election day, urging his supporters to vote for Stewart instead. The unofficial results were released the day after the election (Saturday, 10 December) and Morris had a majority of 13 votes over Stewart, with the official declaration to be made on 12 December. This was deferred until 14 December, with Morris ahead by 10 votes. Stewart stood for the Tauranga mayoralty a few months later and was elected the town's first mayor.

Morris was re-elected in the 1884 election, but resigned in April 1885, as he had been appointed to the Legislative Council. The resulting by-election on 22 May 1885 was won by John Sheehan, who died on 12 June 1885. The second 1885 by-election on 11 July was won by Lawrence Grace, who represented the electorate until the end of the term in 1887. The 1887 election was won by William Kelly, who represented the electorate until the end of the term in 1890, at which time the electorate was abolished.

The electorate was recreated in 1908. William Herries was the first representative, elected at the 1908 election; he had since the 1896 election represented the Bay of Plenty electorate. He became a member of the Reform Party when it formed itself in the following year. Herries represented the electorate until his death on 22 February 1923.

The resulting 1923 by-election was won by Charles Macmillan, who also represented the Reform Party. Macmillan won the three subsequent general elections before he was beaten in the 1935 election by Labour's Charles Burnett. At the next election held in 1938, Burnett was beaten by National's Frederick Doidge, who held the electorate until his retirement in 1951.

Doidge was succeeded by George Walsh, who won the 1951 election. Walsh served for seven terms and retired in 1972. Keith Allen was the next representative, first elected in 1972 and an MP until his death shortly before the 1984 election.

Allen's death did not cause a by-election, as it occurred within six months of the next general election. The 1984 election was won by Winston Peters, who had previously represented the Hunua electorate. In 1990 until March 1991, Peters was Minister of Māori Affairs, but he was sacked from Cabinet by Prime Minister Jim Bolger in October 1991 after repeatedly criticising his National Party leadership. Peters remained as a National backbencher, continuing to criticise the party. In late 1992, when the National Party was considering possible candidates for the elections in the following year, it was decided that Peters would not be allowed to seek renomination for the Tauranga electorate. Peters unsuccessfully challenged this decision in the High Court, and in early 1993, he chose to resign from the party and from Parliament. This prompted a by-election in Tauranga some months before the scheduled general election. Peters stood as an independent and won with over 90% of the vote, assisted by the major parties not standing candidates against him. Shortly before the 1993 election, Peters established New Zealand First and retained the Tauranga electorate. He continued to represent Tauranga until he was defeated in the 2005 election by National's Bob Clarkson.

Clarkson's defeat of Winston Peters was significant, as this resulted in New Zealand First losing its only electorate seat. The party still gained parliamentary representation by polling over the five percent threshold, however. Clarkson retired at the end of the parliamentary term. He was succeeded by National's Simon Bridges, who won the 2008 election, with Peters coming a distant second. Bridges was re-elected in 2011.

=== Members of Parliament ===
Key

Independent Conservative Reform Labour National NZ First United Future

Election	Winner
1881 election	George Morris
1884 election	George Morris
1885 by-election	John Sheehan
1885 by-election	Lawrence Grace
1887 election	William Kelly
(Electorate abolished 1890–1908)
1908 election	William Herries
1911 election	William Herries
1914 election	William Herries
1919 election	William Herries
1922 election	William Herries
1923 by-election	Charles Macmillan
1925 election	Charles Macmillan
1928 election	Charles Macmillan
1931 election	Charles Macmillan
1935 election	Charles Burnett
1938 election	Frederick Doidge
1943 election	Frederick Doidge
1946 election	Frederick Doidge
1949 election	Frederick Doidge
1951 election	George Walsh
1954 election	George Walsh
1957 election	George Walsh
1960 election	George Walsh
1963 election	George Walsh
1966 election	George Walsh
1969 election	George Walsh
1972 election	Keith Allen
1975 election	Keith Allen
1978 election	Keith Allen
1981 election	Keith Allen
1984 election	Winston Peters
1987 election	Winston Peters
1990 election	Winston Peters
1993 by-election	Winston Peters
1993 election	Winston Peters
1996 election	Winston Peters
1999 election	Winston Peters
2002 election	Winston Peters
2005 election	Bob Clarkson
2008 election	Simon Bridges
2011 election	Simon Bridges
2014 election	Simon Bridges
2017 election	Simon Bridges
2020 election	Simon Bridges
2022 by-election	Sam Uffindell
2023 election	Sam Uffindell

=== List MPs ===
Members of Parliament elected from party lists in elections where that person also unsuccessfully contested the Tauranga electorate. Unless otherwise stated, all MPs terms began and ended at general elections.

Election	Winner
1996 election	Katherine O'Regan
1999 election	Margaret Wilson
2002 election	Margaret Wilson
2002 election	Larry Baldock
2005 election	Winston Peters
2011 election	Brendan Horan
2014 election	Clayton Mitchell
2017 election	Clayton Mitchell
2017 election	Jan Tinetti
2020 election	Jan Tinetti
2023 election	Jan Tinetti

== Election results ==
=== 2026 election ===
The next election will be held on 7 November 2026. Candidates for Tauranga are listed at Candidates in the 2026 New Zealand general election by electorate § Tauranga. Official results will be available after 27 November 2026.

=== 2023 election ===
2023 general election: Tauranga
Notes:	Blue background denotes the winner of the electorate vote. Pink background denotes a candidate elected from their party list. Yellow background denotes an electorate win by a list member, or other incumbent. A ✓ or ✗ denotes status of any incumbent, win or lose respectively.						
Party	Candidate	Votes	%	±%	Party votes	%	±%
National	✓ Sam Uffindell	18,980	45.68	−10.19	19,345	45.93	+13.43
Labour	Jan Tinetti	9,610	23.13	−2.17	7,664	18.19	−23.82
ACT	Christine Young	3,791	9.12		4,471	10.61	+1.66
NZ First	Erika Harvey	3,403	8.19	+5.04	3,753	8.91	+5.30
Green	Justin Crooks	2,729	6.56		3,766	8.94	
Independent	Larry Baldock	1,039	2.50				
Te Pāti Māori	Mikaere Sydney	613	1.47		440	1.04	+0.69
Vision NZ	Leon Samuels	285	0.68				
Animal Justice	Chelsea Stokman	246	0.59		85	0.20	
New Conservatives	Jonathan Langridge	245	0.58		101	0.23	−2.11
Opportunities					935	2.22	+0.30
NZ Loyal					470	1.11	
NewZeal					463	1.09	
Freedoms NZ					171	0.40	
Legalise Cannabis					124	0.29	−0.02
DemocracyNZ					66	0.15	
New Nation					39	0.09	
Women's Rights					35	0.08	
Leighton Baker Party					24	0.05	
Informal votes		603			162		
Total valid votes		41,544			42,114		
National hold	Majority	9,370	22.55	−8.02			

=== 2022 by-election ===
The following table shows the final by-election results:

2022 Tauranga by-election
Notes: Blue background denotes the winner of the by-election. Pink background denotes a candidate elected from their party list prior to the by-election. Yellow background denotes the winner of the by-election, who was a list MP prior to the by-election. A ✓ or ✗ denotes status of any incumbent, win or lose respectively.
Party	Candidate	Votes	%	±%
National	Sam Uffindell	11,613	55.87	
Labour	Jan Tinetti	5,259	25.30	-13.23
ACT	Cameron Luxton	2,133	10.26	+6.29
Outdoors	Sue Grey	1,030	4.95	
New Nation	Andrew Hollis	260	1.25	
ONE	Allan Cawood	182	0.87	
Legalise Cannabis	Christopher Coker	117	0.56	
New Conservatives	Helen Houghton	103	0.49	
Independent	Yvette Lamare	22	0.10	+0.04
Independent	Peter Wakeman	20	0.09	
Independent	Tony Corbett	17	0.08	
Independent	Gordon Dickson	9	0.04	
Informal votes		19	0.09	−1.52
Majority		6,354	30.57	
Turnout		20,784	40.19	−44.45
National hold		Swing	+26.34	

=== 2020 election ===
2020 general election: Tauranga
Notes:	Blue background denotes the winner of the electorate vote. Pink background denotes a candidate elected from their party list. Yellow background denotes an electorate win by a list member, or other incumbent. A ✓ or ✗ denotes status of any incumbent, win or lose respectively.						
Party	Candidate	Votes	%	±%	Party votes	%	±%
National	✓ Simon Bridges	18,721	42.76	−11.53	14,437	32.50	−20.10
Labour	Jan Tinetti	16,865	38.53	+12.65	18,547	42.01	+15.31
Green	Josh Cole	1,901	4.34	−0.55	2,407	5.45	+1.57
ACT	Cameron Luxton	1,739	3.97	+3.45	3,952	8.95	+8.35
NZ First	Erika Harvey	1,397	3.15	−9.04	1,595	3.61	−7.63
Opportunities	Andrew Caie	935	2.16	—	847	1.92	−1.26
New Conservative	Paul Hignett	725	1.66	—	1,032	2.34	+2.06
Advance NZ	Daniel Crosa	471	1.08	—	540	1.22	—
Outdoors	Tracy Livingston	188	0.43	—	53	0.12	+0.05
Independent	James Capamagian	83	0.19	—			
Independent	Yvette Lamare	63	0.14	+0.01			
Maori Party					155	0.35	−0.17
Legalise Cannabis					139	0.31	+0.09
ONE					95	0.22	—
Vision NZ					51	0.12	—
Sustainable NZ					31	0.07	—
Social Credit					11	0.02	−0.01
TEA					9	0.02	—
Heartland					3	0.01	—
Informal votes		706			334		
Total valid votes		43,776			44,148		
National hold	Majority	1,856	4.23	−24.18			

=== 2017 election ===
2017 general election: Tauranga
Notes:	Blue background denotes the winner of the electorate vote. Pink background denotes a candidate elected from their party list. Yellow background denotes an electorate win by a list member, or other incumbent. A ✓ or ✗ denotes status of any incumbent, win or lose respectively.						
Party	Candidate	Votes	%	±%	Party votes	%	±%
National	✓ Simon Bridges	21,499	54.29	−2.59	21,182	52.6	−3.21
Labour	Jan Tinetti	10,247	25.88	+9.76	10,737	26.7	+12.2
NZ First	Clayton Mitchell	4,829	12.19	−3.88	4,523	11.24	−3.26
Green	Emma-Leigh Hodge	1,935	4.89	−1.09	1,562	3.88	−3.24
Māori Party	Joseph James Borell	267	0.67	+0.15	211	0.52	−0.08
ACT	Stuart Pedersen	205	0.52	+0.1	242	0.6	+0.24
Independent	Rusty Kane	72	0.18	—			
United Future	Ben Rickard	64	0.16	−0.08	40	0.1	−0.15
Independent	Yvette Lamare	50	0.13	—			
Independent	Hugh E Robb	49	0.12	—			
Democrats	Jason Jobsis	33	0.08	—	14	0.03	−0.02
Opportunities					1,282	3.18	—
Conservative					113	0.28	−5.5
Legalise Cannabis					89	0.22	−0.08
Outdoors					27	0.07	—
Ban 1080					22	0.05	+0.02
People's Party					17	0.04	—
Mana					8	0.02	−0.46 (Note: 2017 Mana Party swing is relative to the votes for Internet-Mana in 2014; it shared a party list with the Internet Party in the 2014 election)
Internet					6	0.01	−0.47 (Note: 2017 Internet Party swing is relative to the votes for Internet-Mana in 2014; it shared a party list with Mana Party in the 2014 election)
Informal votes		350			180		
Total valid votes		39,600			40,255		
National hold	Majority	11,252	28.41	−12.35			

=== 2014 election ===
2014 general election: Tauranga
Notes:	Blue background denotes the winner of the electorate vote. Pink background denotes a candidate elected from their party list. Yellow background denotes an electorate win by a list member, or other incumbent. A ✓ or ✗ denotes status of any incumbent, win or lose respectively.						
Party	Candidate	Votes	%	±%	Party votes	%	±%
National	✓ Simon Bridges	20,711	56.88	−4.52	20,728	55.81	+1.58
Labour	Rachel Jones	5,869	16.12	+2.97	5,361	14.50	−0.58
NZ First	Clayton Mitchell	5,851	16.07	+3.19	5,387	14.50	−0.40
Green	Ian McLean	2,177	5.98	−0.89	2,645	7.12	−1.64
Conservative	Nathaniel Heslop	1,065	2.92	−1.31	2,146	5.78	+1.69
Māori Party	Verna Ohai-Gate	188	0.52	+0.18	222	0.60	+0.10
Independent Coalition	Michael O'Neill	179	0.49	—	96	0.26	—
ACT	Stuart Pedersen	154	0.42	−0.11	134	0.36	−0.80
United Future	James Maxwell	87	0.24	—	94	0.25	−0.31
Independent	Rusty Kane	84	0.23	—			
Independent	Yvette Lamare	46	0.13	−0.04			
Internet Mana					180	0.48	+0.32 (Note: 2014 Internet Mana swing is relative to the votes for Mana in 2011; it shared a party list with Internet in the 2014 election)
Legalise Cannabis					110	0.30	−0.20
Democrats					17	0.05	−0.01
Ban 1080					12	0.03	—
Civilian					7	0.02	—
Focus					3	0.01	—
Informal votes		312			152		
Total valid votes		36,411			37,142		
Turnout		37,294					
National hold	Majority	14,842	40.76	−7.48			

=== 2011 election ===
2011 general election: Tauranga
Notes:	Blue background denotes the winner of the electorate vote. Pink background denotes a candidate elected from their party list. Yellow background denotes an electorate win by a list member, or other incumbent. A ✓ or ✗ denotes status of any incumbent, win or lose respectively.						
Party	Candidate	Votes	%	±%	Party votes	%	±%
National	✓ Simon Bridges	21,971	61.40	+4.59	19,858	54.23	−0.08
Labour	Deborah Mahuta-Coyle	4,707	13.15	+5.45	5,496	15.01	−7.61
NZ First	Brendan Horan	4,611	12.88	−12.24	5,455	14.90	+4.78
Green	Ian McLean	2,458	6.87	+2.93	3,208	8.76	+4.18
Conservative	Larry Baldock	1,512	4.23	−0.78 (Note: Larry Baldock contested the electorate in 2008 as a candidate for the Kiwi Party)	1,499	4.09	—
ACT	Kath McCabe	190	0.53	−0.05	426	1.16	−1.73
Māori Party	Awanui Black	123	0.34	+0.34	182	0.50	−0.07
Mana	Jayson Gardiner	90	0.25	+0.25	59	0.16	+0.16
Democrats	Katherine Ransom	63	0.18	+0.09	22	0.06	−0.01
Independent	Yvette Lamare	61	0.17	+0.17			
United Future					205	0.56	−0.12
Legalise Cannabis					184	0.50	+0.13
Libertarianz					18	0.05	−0.01
Alliance					8	0.02	−0.02
Informal votes		699			283		
Total valid votes		35,786			36,620		
National hold	Majority	17,264	48.24	+16.55			

Electorate (as at 26 November 2011): 48,133

=== 2008 election ===
2008 general election: Tauranga
Notes:	Blue background denotes the winner of the electorate vote. Pink background denotes a candidate elected from their party list. Yellow background denotes an electorate win by a list member, or other incumbent. A ✓ or ✗ denotes status of any incumbent, win or lose respectively.						
Party	Candidate	Votes	%	±%	Party votes	%	±%
National	Simon Bridges	21,051	56.81	+15.19	20,418	54.31	+9.04
NZ First	Winston Peters	9,309	25.12	−14.47	3,804	10.12	−3.15
Labour	Anne Pankhurst	2,856	7.71	−3.43	8,504	22.62	−7.61
Kiwi	Larry Baldock	1,893	5.11		897	2.39	
Green	Karen Summerhays	1,461	3.94	+1.58	1,721	4.58	+1.07
ACT	Ron Scott	217	0.59	+0.42	1,086	2.89	+1.99
Independent	Gray Eatwell	111	0.30				
United Future	John D. Willocks	76	0.21	−3.46	257	0.68	−3.79
Democrats	Katherine Ransom	31	0.08	-0.00	27	0.07	+0.01
Independent	Terry Leaming	30	0.08				
RONZ	David Macartney	20	0.05		26	0.07	+0.06
Māori Party					215	0.57	+0.23
Bill and Ben					179	0.48	
Progressive					178	0.47	−0.30
Legalise Cannabis					140	0.37	+0.19
Family Party					81	0.22	
Libertarianz					21	0.06	-0.00
Alliance					15	0.04	+0.02
Workers Party					14	0.04	
Pacific					9	0.02	
RAM					2	0.01	
Informal votes		229			147		
Total valid votes		37,055			37,594		
National hold	Majority	11,742	31.69	+29.67			

=== 2005 election ===
2005 general election: Tauranga
Notes:	Blue background denotes the winner of the electorate vote. Pink background denotes a candidate elected from their party list. Yellow background denotes an electorate win by a list member, or other incumbent. A ✓ or ✗ denotes status of any incumbent, win or lose respectively.						
Party	Candidate	Votes	%	±%	Party votes	%	±%
National	Bob Clarkson	15,020	41.62	+25.30	16,559	45.28	+23.30
NZ First	✗ Winston Peters	14,290	39.59	−13.08	4,851	13.26	−8.80
Labour	Sally Barrett	4,020	11.14	−9.70	11,055	30.23	−1.93
United Future	Larry Baldock	1,323	3.67	−1.39	1,636	4.47	−5.09
Green	Noel Peterson	853	2.36	−0.31	1,283	3.51	−2.15
Destiny	Neils Jensen	272	0.75	+0.75	295	0.81	+0.81
Progressive	Karandeep Singh Lall	164	0.45	+0.06	282	0.77	−0.02
ACT	Francis Denz	61	0.17	−0.75	329	0.90	−3.79
Libertarianz	Russell Watkins	57	0.16	−0.32	22	0.06	+0.06
Democrats	Katherine Ransom	31	0.09	+0.09	27	0.07	+0.07
Māori Party					124	0.34	+0.34
Legalise Cannabis					65	0.18	−0.25
Christian Heritage					22	0.06	−0.98
Alliance					7	0.02	−0.56
One NZ					7	0.02	−0.06
99 MP					4	0.01	+0.01
Direct Democracy					3	0.01	+0.01
RONZ					3	0.01	+0.01
Family Rights					2	0.01	+0.01
Informal votes		229			152		
Total valid votes		36,091			36,573		
National gain from NZ First	Majority	730	2.02	+38.37			

=== 2002 election ===
2002 general election: Tauranga
Notes:	Blue background denotes the winner of the electorate vote. Pink background denotes a candidate elected from their party list. Yellow background denotes an electorate win by a list member, or other incumbent. A ✓ or ✗ denotes status of any incumbent, win or lose respectively.						
Party	Candidate	Votes	%	±%	Party votes	%	±%
NZ First	✓ Winston Peters	17,145	52.67	+22.40	7,278	22.06	+9.14
Labour	Margaret Wilson	6,783	20.84	−7.34	10,608	32.16	−1.34
National	Tim Macindoe	5,312	16.32	−13.76	7,250	21.98	−7.72
United Future	Larry Baldock	1,647	5.06	+5.06	3,155	9.56	+9.56
Green	Ian G. Douglas	870	2.67	−0.68	1,865	5.65	+0.84
ACT	Ron Scott	300	0.92	+0.92	1517	4.60	−1.55
Christian Heritage	Margaret Canter-Leighton	207	0.64	−1.55	342	1.04	−1.75
Libertarianz	Russell Watkins	157	0.49	+0.49			
Progressive	Gary Oster	129	0.40	+0.40	262	0.79	+0.79
ORNZ					337	1.02	+1.02
Alliance					191	0.58	−4.01
Legalise Cannabis					140	0.42	−0.31
One NZ					27	0.08	-0.00
Mana Māori					12	0.04	+0.00
NMP					5	0.02	−0.05
Informal votes		176			111		
Total valid votes		32,550			32,989		
NZ First hold	Majority	10,362	31.83	+31.65			

=== 1999 election ===
1999 general election: Tauranga
Notes:	Blue background denotes the winner of the electorate vote. Pink background denotes a candidate elected from their party list. Yellow background denotes an electorate win by a list member, or other incumbent. A ✓ or ✗ denotes status of any incumbent, win or lose respectively.						
Party	Candidate	Votes	%	±%	Party votes	%	±%
NZ First	✓ Winston Peters	10,225	30.27	−19.70	4,387	12.92	−12.92
National	Katherine O'Regan	10,162	30.08	+1.23	10,083	29.70	−2.64
Labour	Margaret Wilson	9,519	28.18	+18.33	11,372	33.50	+12.02
Christian Democrats	Larry Baldock	1,456	4.31	+4.31	1,182	3.48	+3.48
Green	Karen Summerhays	1,131	3.35	+3.35	1,634	4.81	+4.81
Christian Heritage	Frank Grover	738	2.18	+2.18	945	2.78	+2.78
Alliance	Tekarehana Wicks	453	1.34	−2.79	1,558	4.59	−2.29
Independent	John Hepburn	73	0.22	+0.22			
NMP	Vivienne Berry-Evans	24	0.07	+0.07	23	0.07	+0.07
ACT					2088	6.15	+2.01
Legalise Cannabis					249	0.73	−0.28
United NZ					159	0.47	−0.03
Libertarianz					112	0.33	+0.31
McGillicuddy Serious					44	0.13	−0.16
Animals First					39	0.11	+0.00
One NZ					28	0.08	+0.08
Natural Law					16	0.05	-0.00
Mana Māori					12	0.04	+0.02
Mauri Pacific					7	0.02	+0.02
The People's Choice					4	0.01	+0.01
Freedom Movement					3	0.01	+0.01
Republican					3	0.01	+0.01
South Island					3	0.01	+0.01
Informal votes		464			294		
Total valid votes		33,781			33,951		
NZ First hold	Majority	63	0.19	−20.93			

=== 1996 election ===
1996 general election: Tauranga
Notes:	Blue background denotes the winner of the electorate vote. Pink background denotes a candidate elected from their party list. Yellow background denotes an electorate win by a list member, or other incumbent. A ✓ or ✗ denotes status of any incumbent, win or lose respectively.						
Party	Candidate	Votes	%	±%	Party votes	%	±%
NZ First	✓ Winston Peters	18,997	49.97	−5.36	9,849	25.84	
National	Katherine O'Regan	10,969	28.85	+8.21	12,325	32.33	
Labour	Stephanie Hammond	3,745	9.85	−2.58	8,187	21.48	
Christian Coalition	Kel Steiner	1,679	4.42	+4.42	2,612	6.85	
Alliance	Gary Barham	1,570	4.13	−4.91	2,621	6.88	
Independent	Michael Ryan	615	1.62	+1.62			
McGillicuddy Serious	Graeme Cairns	310	0.82	−0.05	109	0.29	
Natural Law	Helen Treadwell	72	0.19	−0.07	19	0.05	
Te Tawharau	Steven Te Kani	31	0.08	+0.08	94	0.01	
Independent	Maxine Leech	27	0.07	+0.07			
ACT					1580	4.15	
Legalise Cannabis					386	1.01	
United NZ					189	0.50	
Progressive Green					76	0.20	
Superannuitants & Youth					62	0.16	
Animals First					43	0.11	
Green Society					21	0.06	
Conservatives					10	0.03	
Mana Māori					7	0.02	
Libertarianz					6	0.02	
Advance New Zealand					5	0.01	
Asia Pacific					5	0.01	
Ethnic Minority					3	0.01	
Informal votes		244			141		
Total valid votes		38,015			38,118		
NZ First hold	Majority	8,028	21.12	−13.57			

=== 1993 election ===
1993 general election: Tauranga
Party	Candidate	Votes	%	±%
NZ First	Winston Peters	12,638	55.33	−35.39
National	John Cronin	4,714	20.64	
Labour	Cliff Lee	2,839	12.43	
Alliance	Gary Barham	2,064	9.04	+7.57
Christian Heritage	Barbara Smith	331	1.45	
McGillicuddy Serious	Greg Pittams	198	0.87	−1.28
Natural Law	Jacqueline Hughes	59	0.26	
Majority		7,924	34.69	−53.88
Informal votes		412	1.77	−1.66
Turnout		23,255	85.87	+36.79
Registered electors		27,082		

=== 1993 by-election ===
1993 Tauranga by-election
Party	Candidate	Votes	%	±%
Independent	Winston Peters	11,458	90.71	+25.07
McGillicuddy Serious	Greg Pittams	271	2.15	
Independent	Peter Wakeman	190	1.50	
HFA	Gary Barham	185	1.46	
Silent Majority	Peter Richard Watson	184	1.46	
Independent	Ian Baikie	109	0.86	
Natural Law	Lynne Lee	101	0.80	
HEMP	Ashley Bedford	55	0.44	
Blokes' Liberation Front	Rhona Tengblad	29	0.23	
Aotearoa Partnership	Raymond Campbell	25	0.20	
Christ's Ambassadors Union	Victor Bryers	24	0.19	
Informal votes		449	3.43	
Majority		11,187	88.57	+44.61
Turnout		13,080	49.08	−38.99
Registered electors		26,651		

=== 1990 election ===
1990 general election: Tauranga
Party	Candidate	Votes	%	±%
National	Winston Peters	13,906	65.64	+12.22
Labour	Bill Delaney	4,592	21.67	
Green	Terry Coles	1,566	7.39	
NewLabour	Muriel Powell	605	2.85	
Social Credit	Trevor Powell	287	1.35	
McGillicuddy Serious	Richard Barr	141	0.66	
Democrats	Douglas Meiklejohn	87	0.41	
Majority		9,314	43.96	+32.33
Turnout		21,184	88.07	+0.14
Registered electors		24,052		

=== 1987 election ===
1987 general election: Tauranga
Party	Candidate	Votes	%	±%
National	Winston Peters	11,256	53.42	+11.14
Labour	Jenny Seddon	8,805	41.78	
Democrats	G Oster	1,009	4.78	
Majority		2,451	11.63	−9.74
Turnout		21,070	87.93	−4.37
Registered electors		23,961		

=== 1984 election ===
1984 general election: Tauranga
Party	Candidate	Votes	%	±%
National	Winston Peters	9,716	42.28	
NZ Party	David Parlour	4,804	20.90	
Labour	Ted Howard	4,667	20.30	
Social Credit	Paul Hills	3,793	16.50	−17.19
Majority		4,912	21.37	
Turnout		22,980	92.30	+2.85
Registered electors		24,896		

=== 1981 election ===
1981 general election: Tauranga
Party	Candidate	Votes	%	±%
National	Keith Allen	9,694	43.41	−2.05
Social Credit	Paul Hills	7,642	34.22	+5.66
Labour	Glenda Fryer	4,338	19.42	
Independent	Colin Fraser MacGillivray	532	2.38	
Values	C M Wait	121	0.54	
Majority		2,232	9.99	−6.91
Turnout		22,327	90.17	
Registered electors		24,759		

=== 1978 election ===
1978 general election: Tauranga
Party	Candidate	Votes	%	±%
National	Keith Allen	8,924	45.46	−7.37
Social Credit	Paul Hills	5,606	28.56	
Labour	Charles William Steele-Boyce	4,665	23.76	
Values	Anthony Neville	433	2.20	
Majority		3,318	16.90	−5.31
Turnout		19,628	74.62	−8.86
Registered electors		26,301		

=== 1975 election ===
1975 general election: Tauranga
Party	Candidate	Votes	%	±%
National	Keith Allen	11,517	52.83	+4.40
Labour	Richard Hendry	6,674	30.61	
Social Credit	Raymond Lawrence Mills	2,571	11.79	+1.42
Values	Deidre Kent	1,036	4.75	
Majority		4,843	22.21	+10.16
Turnout		21,798	83.48	−4.57
Registered electors		26,110		

=== 1972 election ===
1972 general election: Tauranga
Party	Candidate	Votes	%	±%
National	Keith Allen	8,902	48.43	
Labour	Henry Uttinger	6,687	36.38	
Social Credit	Raymond Lawrence Mills	1,907	10.37	
Values	Colin Fraser MacGillivray	596	3.24	
New Democratic	Wilfrid Owen	288	1.56	
Majority		2,215	12.05	
Turnout		18,380	88.05	−1.29
Registered electors		20,874		

=== 1969 election ===
1969 general election: Tauranga
Party	Candidate	Votes	%	±%
National	George Walsh	9,742	52.49	+5.06
Labour	Ray Dillon	7,038	37.92	
Social Credit	John Stuart-Menzies	1,662	8.95	
Country Party	Clifford Stanley Emeny	115	0.61	
Majority		2,704	14.57	+1.01
Turnout		18,557	89.34	−3.57
Registered electors		20,769		

=== 1966 election ===
1966 general election: Tauranga
Party	Candidate	Votes	%	±%
National	George Walsh	8,040	47.43	−8.57
Labour	Olive Smuts-Kennedy	5,741	33.86	
Social Credit	Robert William Johnson	3,170	18.70	+1.58
Majority		2,299	13.56	−15.57
Turnout		16,951	85.77	−1.59
Registered electors		19,762		

=== 1963 election ===
1963 general election: Tauranga
Party	Candidate	Votes	%	±%
National	George Walsh	8,738	56.00	−2.59
Labour	Gordon Hardaker	4,193	26.88	
Social Credit	Robert William Johnson	2,670	17.12	
Majority		4,545	29.13	−4.53
Turnout		15,601	87.36	−1.11
Registered electors		17,857		

=== 1960 election ===
1960 general election: Tauranga
Party	Candidate	Votes	%	±%
National	George Walsh	9,120	58.59	+4.38
Labour	D C Goodfellow	3,881	24.94	
Social Credit	Robert Young	2,563	16.47	
Majority		5,239	33.66	+10.48
Turnout		15,564	88.47	−2.89
Registered electors		17,591		

=== 1957 election ===
1957 general election: Tauranga
Party	Candidate	Votes	%	±%
National	George Walsh	7,814	54.21	−3.67
Labour	Oliver Liddell	4,472	31.03	
Social Credit	Eric Ernest McGowan	2,127	14.76	
Majority		3,342	23.18	−2.25
Turnout		14,413	91.36	+1.26
Registered electors		15,776		

=== 1954 election ===
1954 general election: Tauranga
Party	Candidate	Votes	%	±%
National	George Walsh	7,846	57.88	−10.50
Labour	Oliver Liddell	4,398	32.45	
Social Credit	Ernest James Whyte	1,311	9.67	
Majority		3,448	25.43	−11.33
Turnout		13,555	90.10	+4.21
Registered electors		15,043		

=== 1951 election ===
1951 General election: Tauranga
Party	Candidate	Votes	%	±%
National	George Walsh	10,043	68.38	
Labour	Hillary Joseph Pickett	4,643	31.62	−2.02
Majority		5,400	36.76	
Turnout		14,686	85.89	−4.76
Registered electors		17,097		

=== 1949 election ===
1949 general election: Tauranga
Party	Candidate	Votes	%	±%
National	Frederick Doidge	9,330	66.33	+6.06
Labour	Hillary Joseph Pickett	4,735	33.64	
Majority		4,595	32.66	+12.11
Turnout		14,065	90.65	−0.87
Registered electors		15,515		

=== 1946 election ===
1946 general election: Tauranga
Party	Candidate	Votes	%	±%
National	Frederick Doidge	7,931	60.27	−0.99
Labour	Dudley A. Hill	5,227	39.73	+9.14
Majority		2,704	20.55	−10.11
Turnout		13,158	91.52	−2.08
Registered electors		14,377		

=== 1943 election ===
1943 general election: Tauranga
Party	Candidate	Votes	%	±%
National	Frederick Doidge	7,241	61.26	+6.73
Labour	Dudley A. Hill	3,616	30.59	
Independent	Lionel Wilkinson	449	3.79	
Real Democracy	Henry James Angus	393	3.32	
Informal votes		121	1.02	+0.32
Majority		3,625	30.66	+20.17
Turnout		11,820	93.60	+0.41
Registered electors		12,628		

=== 1938 election ===
1938 general election: Tauranga
Party	Candidate	Votes	%	±%
National	Frederick Doidge	5,915	54.53	
Labour	Charles Burnett	4,777	44.04	+8.98
Country Party	Horace Charles Barker	78	0.71	
Informal votes		76	0.70	−0.06
Majority		1,138	10.49	
Turnout		10,846	93.21	+3.86
Registered electors		11,635		

=== 1935 election ===
1935 general election: Tauranga
Party	Candidate	Votes	%	±%
Labour	Charles Burnett	3,602	35.06	
Reform	Charles Macmillan	3,567	34.72	−7.58
Country Party	Albert Robinson	2,243	21.83	
Democrat	Charles Thomas McFarlane	806	7.84	
Independent	Fred Polley	53	0.51	
Informal votes		79	0.76	+0.23
Majority		35	0.34	
Turnout		10,271	89.35	+10.62
Registered electors		11,495		

=== 1931 election ===
1931 general election: Tauranga
Party	Candidate	Votes	%	±%
Reform	Charles Macmillan	3,147	42.30	−0.64
Independent	Bill Sullivan (Note: Bill Sullivan was a member of the United Party, but Charles Macmillan was the official candidate of the United–Reform Coalition, hence Sullivan stood as an independent)	2,489	33.46	
Country Party	Frank Colbeck (Note: For biographical details of Frank Colbeck, please refer to his father's article)	1,803	24.24	+1.26
Informal votes		40	0.53	−0.78
Majority		658	8.85	−0.02
Turnout		7,479	78.73	−7.05
Registered electors		9,499		

Table footnotes:

=== 1928 election ===
1928 general election: Tauranga
Party	Candidate	Votes	%	±%
Reform	Charles Macmillan	3,285	42.94	
Labour	Douglas Charles Chalmers	2,607	34.08	
Country Party	Frank Colbeck (Note: For biographical details of Frank Colbeck, please refer to his father's article)	1,758	22.98	
Majority		678	8.86	
Informal votes		102	1.32	
Turnout		7,752	85.78	
Registered electors		9,037		

Table footnotes:

=== 1923 by-election ===
1923 Tauranga by-election
Party	Candidate	Votes	%	±%
Reform	Charles Macmillan	4,360	57.41	
Liberal	Sir Joseph Ward	3,235	42.59	
Informal votes		35	0.46	
Majority		1,125	14.81	
Turnout		7,630	85.53	
Registered electors		8,921		
Reform hold		Swing		

=== 1919 election ===
1919 general election: Tauranga
Party	Candidate	Votes	%	±%
Reform	William Herries	3,946	65.42	
Liberal	Benjamin Robbins	2,086	34.58	
Majority		1,860	30.84	
Informal votes		118	1.92	
Turnout		6,150	68.19	
Registered electors		9,019		

=== 1881 election ===
1881 general election: Tauranga
Party	Candidate	Votes	%	±%
Independent	George Morris	381	36.18	
Independent	George Vesey Stewart	371	35.23	
Independent	William Kelly	301	28.58	
Majority		10	0.95	
Turnout		1,053	71.34	
Registered electors		1,476		

== Bibliography ==
- Hislop, J. (1923). The General Election, 1922. Government Printer.
- Part 1: Votes recorded at each polling place (Technical report). Chief Electoral Office. 1993.
- McRobie, Alan (1989). Electoral Atlas of New Zealand. Wellington: GP Books. ISBN 0-477-01384-8.
- Scholefield, Guy (1950) [First published in 1913]. New Zealand Parliamentary Record, 1840–1949 (3rd ed.). Wellington: Govt. Printer.
- Wilson, Jim (1985) [First published in 1913]. New Zealand Parliamentary Record, 1840–1984 (4th ed.). Wellington: V.R. Ward, Govt. Printer. OCLC 154283103.
- Norton, Clifford (1988). New Zealand Parliamentary Election Results 1946–1987: Occasional Publications No 1, Department of Political Science. Wellington: Victoria University of Wellington. ISBN 0-475-11200-8.
