= Thomas Grace (missionary) =

English missionary (1815–1879)

Thomas Samuel Grace
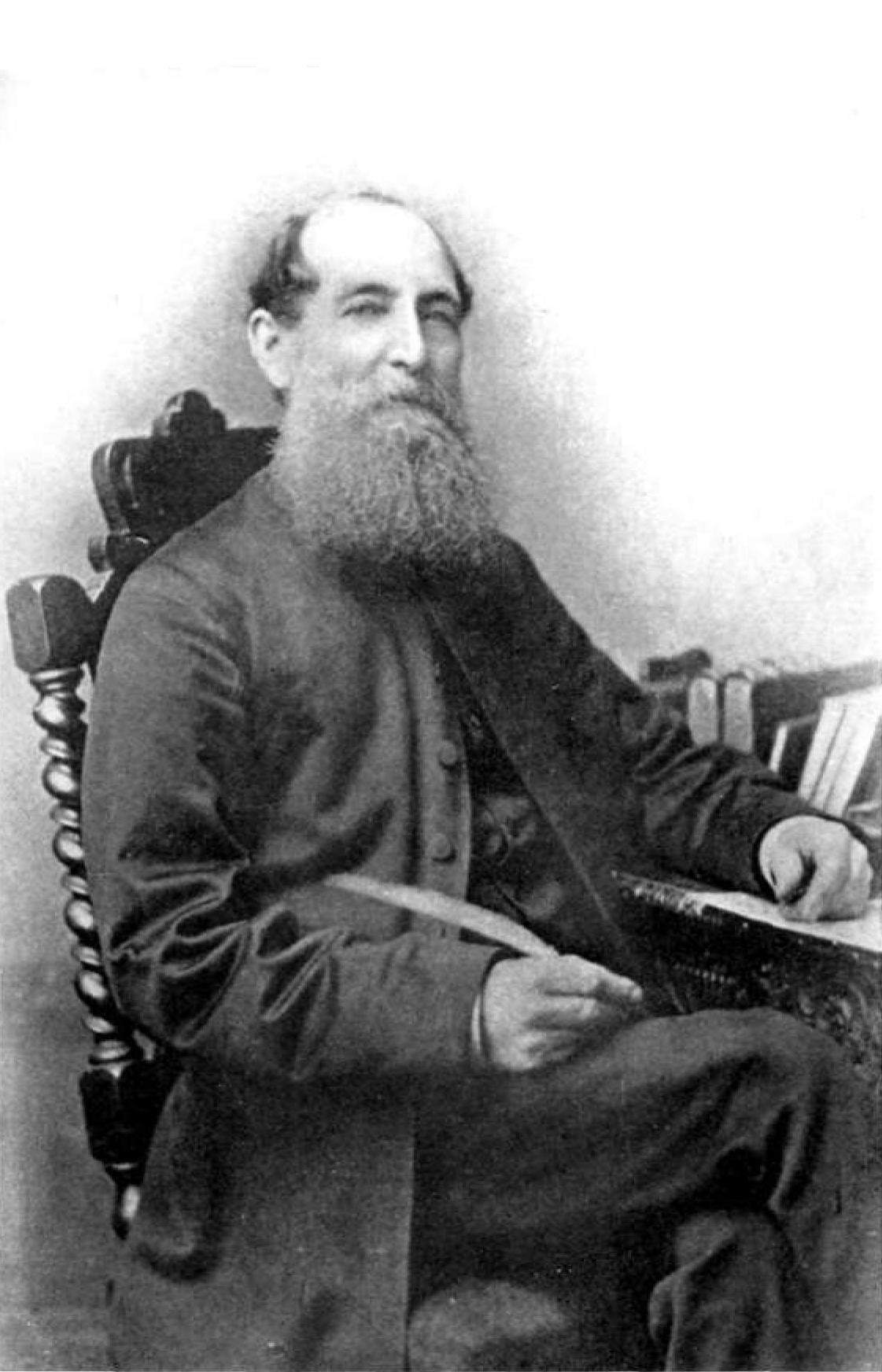
- Thomas Samuel Grace
- Born: 16 February 1815; Liverpool, England
- Died: 30 April 1879
- Occupation: Missionary
- Spouse: Agnes Grace
- Relatives: Lawrence Marshall Grace M.P. (son)

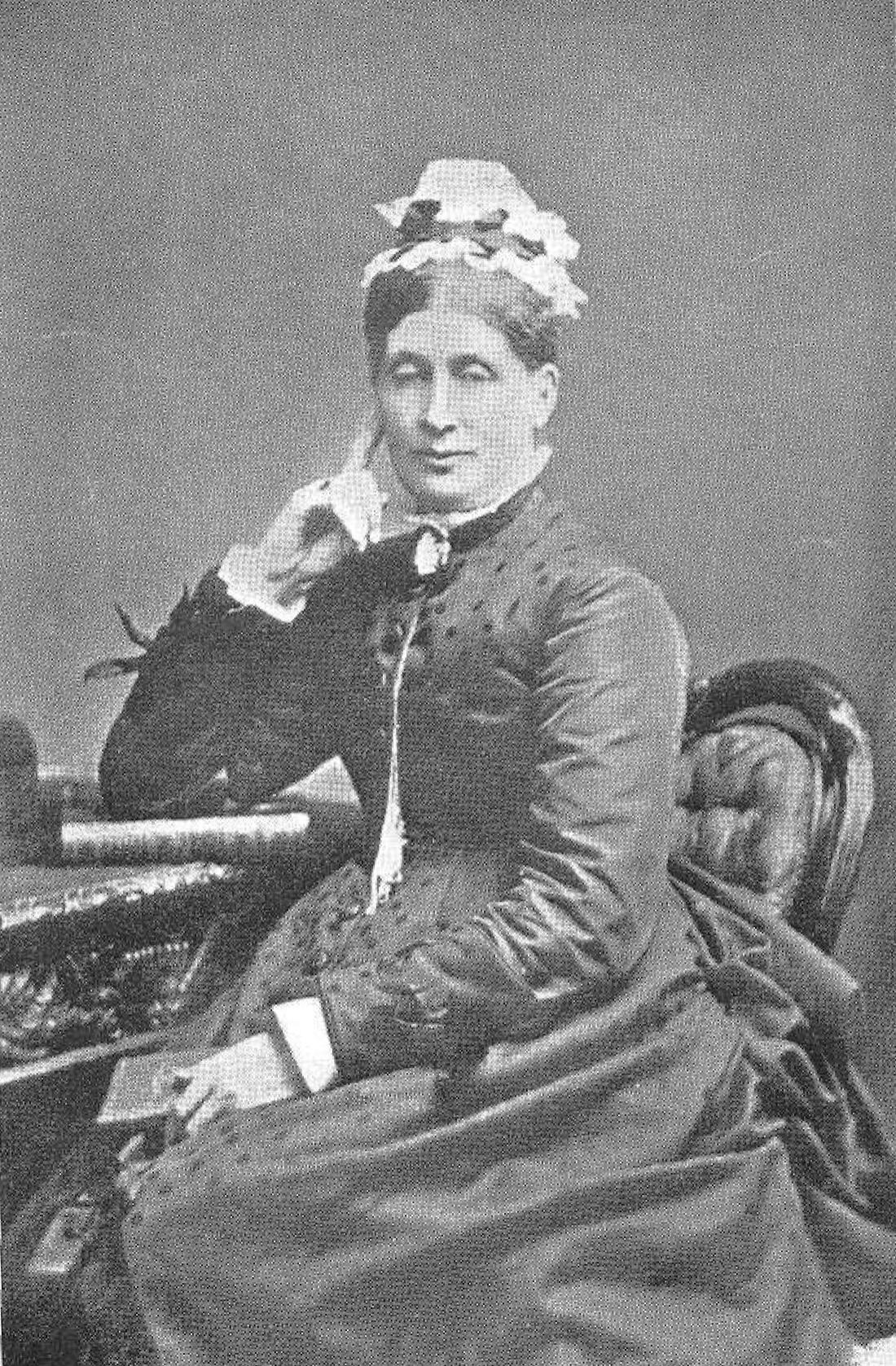
Agnes Grace, his wife

Thomas Samuel Grace (16 February 1815 – 30 April 1879) was an English Anglican missionary in New Zealand. He was a member of the Church Missionary Society. He was born in Liverpool, Lancashire, England on 16 February 1815. Prior to being engaged by the Church Missionary Society (CMS) in 1844, Grace had success in business and was later ordained at St Bee's College. He and his wife Grace sailed to New Zealand in 1850, initially to establish a new station at Taupo, but instead to replace William Williams at Tūranga in Poverty Bay from 1850 until 1853, during the latter's trip to Britain. Te Kooti attended the boarding school at Tūranga during the time Grace was in charge of the mission.

He was appointed to Taupō. In 1865 the Pai Mārire ransacked his house. Grace fled from Taupō to Ōpōtiki and was caught up in the Völkner Incident. He was arrested and put on trial by the Pai Mārire party. He was rescued from captivity two weeks later by a British man-of-war, HMS Eclipse, after an attempt by the Pai Mārire to exchange him for Tauranga chief Hori Tupaea, who was in prison. In the 1870s he rebuilt the mission station at Taupō.

His son Lawrence Marshall Grace was Member of Parliament for Tauranga in the 1880s.

== Sources ==
- D. Grace, A Driven Man – Missionary Thomas Samuel Grace 1815-1879: His Life and Letters, Wellington : Ngaio Press, 2004
