= Rabobank New Zealand =

Bank in New Zealand

Rabobank New Zealand Limited
- Type: Subsidiary, Cooperative
- Industry: Banking
- Founded: 1994
- Headquarters: New Zealand
- Key people: Ben Russell
- Products: Rural banking, business banking and saving services
- Net income: ▲NZ$105.49mil (2014)
- Total equity: NZ$1.1bln (2013)
- Parent: Rabobank
- Website: www.rabobank.co.nz

Rabobank New Zealand Limited is a bank in New Zealand, a subsidiary of Rabobank. Rabobank focuses on rural banking, business banking and saving services. The New Zealand subsidiary was registered in 1994, and as of June 2022, has a market share of approximately 3%.

== History ==
In 1998, Rabobank purchased the finance company Wrightson Farmers Finance Limited from Wrightson, a 160-year-old farming business, for NZ$300mil. The sale destabilised Wrighton, but effectively established Rabobank as a rural lender in New Zealand. From November 2008 until December 2012, Rabobank was the principal sponsor of BikeNZ (since renamed to Cycling New Zealand).

=== Credit rating ===
Rabobank New Zealand historically had the highest-possible credit rating of AAA from Standard & Poor's. However, after its parent company Rabobank had its rating downgraded and the deposit guarantee that the parent provided to the New Zealand subsidiary expired, S&P downgraded Rabobank's credit rating to A. Rabobank stated that deposits in Rabobank and RaboDirect made before the expiry of the parental guarantee in 2015 will still be guaranteed as long until they are withdrawn or transferred to another account.

The credit rating of Rabobank New Zealand as of October 2015 is A from Standard & Poor's.

== RaboDirect ==
RaboDirect a division of Rabobank New Zealand specialising in online savings and investments. It runs under the slogan "Your specialist savings bank". RaboDirect offers online savings accounts and access to investment funds.

Cash deposits through RaboDirect are used for lending to the New Zealand rural sector through Rabobank New Zealand.

RaboDirect, originally known as RaboPlus, was launched in February 2006. The bank originally advertised to customers as "Your significant other bank". By August 2006, six months after its launch, it had gathered over $500 million in deposits.

In July 2010 the bank was rebranded as RaboDirect to bring it in line with other countries where Rabodirect operated such services.

== Criticism ==
In March 2013 a Taranaki dairy farming family were forced off their Ōkato farm after Rabobank refused to negotiate a deal to refinance their mortgage with another bank and repossessed the farm. The family were initially given 21 days to come up with a resolution but 2 weeks earlier than this forced off the farm after threatening to damage farm assets. The repossession resulted in bobby calves that were owned by the son of the family being killed by the receivers as well as some stock slaughtered. A journalist, Melanie Reid, from the TV3 show 3rd Degree was assaulted along with the cameraman when questioning the receivers on the receivership. There were also disputes over part of the farm being gifted to the family by local Maori on the condition the farm stay with the family. The farm was sold in May 2013.
