= Hāmi Grace =

New Zealand cricketer (1890–1915)

Thomas Grace
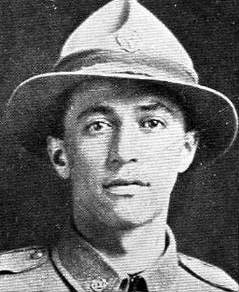

Personal information
- Born: 11 July 1890; Pukawa, New Zealand
- Died: 8 August 1915 (aged 25); Gallipoli, Turkey
- Source: Cricinfo, 24 October 2020

Thomas Marshall Percy Grace (11 July 1890 – 8 August 1915), known as Hāmi Grace, was a New Zealand cricketer. He played in two first-class matches for Wellington from 1911 to 1914. He was killed in action during the Gallipoli campaign in World War I.

== See also ==
- List of Wellington representative cricketers
- List of cricketers who were killed during military service
