= Katherine Mary Clutterbuck =

Australian Anglican nun

Coordinates: 31°52′20″S 116°8′10″E

Sister Kate

Katherine Mary Clutterbuck CSC MBE (October 1860 in Wiltshire, England – 31 July 1946 in Nedlands, Western Australia), usually known as Sister Kate, was an Anglican nun who pioneered a cottage home system for looking after orphan babies and children in Western Australia. She later became well known for her work with Indigenous Australian children who were selected according to a criterion of skin colour and sent to her homes to groom the young "nearly white" children for absorption into the white community. These children would later be described as part of the Stolen Generation.

Clutterbuck was the daughter of well-off parents, Captain Clutterbuck and his wife. She was awarded an Order of the British Empire (Member of the Civil Division), on 1 January 1934, for her services to disadvantaged children.

In December 2006, the West Australian newspaper published a list entitled the "100 Most Influential Western Australians" which included Clutterbuck. The list was developed by a committee including several eminent Western Australian historians.

== Orphanage career ==
In 1881 Clutterbuck joined the Community of the Sisters of the Church, a Church of England order founded in London in 1870 by Mother Emily Ayckbowm. Now referred to as "Sister Kate", Clutterbuck worked with orphans in the London slums for 17 years until 1901 when she and several other sisters were sent to Western Australia to establish a girls' school and orphanage. She arrived in Western Australia in December 1901 with Sister Sarah and 22 orphaned English children aged between 6 and 10 in her care.

Parkerville Children and Youth Care is situated approximately 27.6 km (17.1 mi) east-northeast of the central business district of Perth, Western Australia.

Other sisters of her order set about the establishment of founding a church school (now Perth College), Clutterbuck and Sister Sarah set out to establish a home for orphaned babies. Sisters Rosalie, Vera and Susanna had a prime mission of establishing a school but they were meant to go on to assist Clutterbuck.

Temporary premises in William Street, Perth were used while a permanent children's home in the country was located. The nuns purchased a 20-acre (8.1 ha) block at Parkerville in the Darling Range. Clutterbuck took up residence in 1903 with eight children in an old hut and bark roofed barn which she named The League of Charity Homes for Waifs and Stray Babies and which was later expanded to become Parkerville Children's Home. Forty-five children were being fostered by 1905 and, thanks to a benefactor, Walter Padbury, a large stone nursery was built. Other improvements included a 27,000-litre (6,000-imperial-gallon) water tank and 49 hectares (120 acres) of land partially planted with fruit trees as well as a carriage and horse. The state government provided some funding and by 1911, 100 children were living there. Another two sisters were recruited from England and the building were extended to include a dining-room, schoolhouse and kitchen.

For nearly 30 years Clutterbuck ran the home where over 800 disadvantaged children passed through her care. In 1927 the home was taken over by the Diocese of Perth and in 1930 she retired at the age of 70. She was awarded an MBE the following year.

Parkerville continues to operate today as Parkerville Children and Youth Care, providing "a range of primary, secondary and tertiary services." The goals of these services are to "protect, care, advocate and promote recovery for children and young people who have experienced trauma from abuse, to support families and to work with the community to prevent child abuse."

A small river in the vicinity of the home is named Clutterbuck Creek.

== Return from retirement and the Stolen Generations ==
Friend and associate Ruth Lefroy shared an interest in the welfare of Aboriginal children. In 1932, Lefroy purchased a property in Neville Street, Bayswater called the Children's Cottage Home which was run by Clutterbuck. Another house used as a holiday home was acquired in Beach Street, Mosman Park. The home was funded by government subsidies from the Native Welfare and Child Welfare Departments, as well as fêtes, jumble sales, donations and street collections.

At this time A. O. Neville, the government Chief Protector of Aboriginals, was the architect of an official scheme which oversaw the care, custody and education of Aboriginal and half-caste children under 16 years in the state. The scheme's purpose was to integrate young and part Aboriginal children into white society by separating them from their families. The process by which the separation was done has been widely condemned since a report entitled Bringing Them Home was published in 1997 following a federal government inquiry. These people are now known as the Stolen Generations.

As part of the scheme, Neville directed young Aboriginal children and babies into the Children's Cottage Home run by Clutterbuck.

In June 1934, Clutterbuck and Ruth Lefroy relocated the home with ten school-aged children to a new site on Railway Street (now Treasure Road), Queens Park. The new six-roomed home was named "Myola" and had been purpose built with the help of private sponsorship. Due to a measles epidemic, the cottage was soon extended to create a ward where sick children could be isolated and nursed. In 1935 a kitchen and a second cottage, "Friendly Cottage", were built on the site to accommodate younger children. At this time Queens Park was a relatively undeveloped suburb although the cottage was well located with a school and train station nearby. Towards the end of 1936, Neville began negotiations on behalf of Clutterbuck for the purchase of land immediately adjacent to the home. An adjoining 5.25 acres (2 hectares) was acquired at a cost of £85 in January 1937 using funds donated by a benefactor. The same person also donated funds to extend the second cottage and to build a third cottage and a chapel. This third cottage was known as "Nursery Cottage" and the chapel was named the "Chapel of the Guardian Angel".

Neville supposedly reproached Sister Kate for building the chapel, suggesting that the funds should have been spent on the children.

Church services, Sunday School and daily prayers were conducted in the new chapel on a regular basis. A morning service conducted by Sister Kate was conducted each morning. The chapel was very important to Sister Kate: according to Vera Whittington

Even in her last years, when she no longer took the services, it was her delight to walk to the chapel for private devotions. The chapel stood as a symbol for the centre of Sister Kate's life and that of the Home.

She refused to have the building dedicated, believing that its non-denominational status would encourage patronage by the children, and it was not until after her death in February 1948 that Anglican Archbishop Moline dedicated the chapel. In 1937, fund-raising by a group known as the "Virgillians", led by Mary Durack, enabled further development of the site and in 1938–41 a kindergarten and another cottage were constructed.

With the onset of World War 2 most of the children were evacuated to the Duke of York Hotel at Greenbushes. Some children required specialised medical attention and attendance at Perth hospitals however, and so Ruth Lefroy purchased a cottage at Roleystone. After the war, the Roleystone property was sold and the proceeds used to pay for the construction of "Memorial cottage".

In 1946, funds from the Lotteries Commission helped build "Gran's Cottage" (as she was then known) as a private residence for Sister Kate. Soon after however, she died suddenly at Tresillian Hospital in Nedlands at the age of 86.

== Posthumous events ==
A committee then administered the home, with the position of Superintendent Matron taken over by Ruth Lefroy. The Queens Park complex, which by this time comprised seven cottages as well as the chapel and kindergarten, became known as "Sister Kate's Children's Cottages" in recognition of her work. Ruth Lefroy died in 1953 and her will made provision for the ownership of the property to be donated to the Presbyterian Church, now part of the Uniting Church in Australia.

Dean Collard was appointed Director of the Cottages in August 1987.

In 1988, the cottages were renamed as "Manguri". The organisation continues today to provide Aboriginal child-care services.

Clutterbuck Crescent in the Canberra suburb of Macquarie is named in her honour.

== Notable residents ==
- Ken Colbung, indigenous leader
- Polly Farmer, Australian rules footballer
- Sue Gordon, Perth Children's Court magistrate
- Hannah McGlade, academic, human rights advocate and lawyer
- Rob Riley, director of the Aboriginal Legal Service
