= St Augustine's, Kilburn =

Coordinates: 51.5332°N 0.1915°W

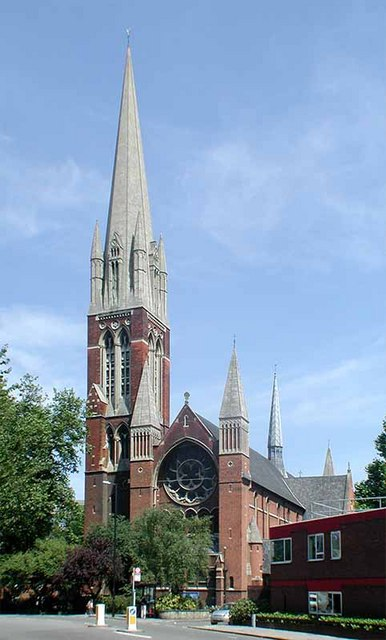
- St Augustine's, Kilburn
- OS grid reference: TQ 25530 83130
- Location: City of Westminster, London
- Country: England
- Denomination: Church of England
- Churchmanship: Anglo-Catholic

History
- Founder: Richard Carr Kirkpatrick
- Dedicated: 1880

Architecture
- Architect: John Loughborough Pearson
- Years built: 1871–1897

Administration
- Diocese: London

Clergy
- Bishop: Bishop of Fulham (AEO)
- Vicar: Colin J. Amos

Saint Augustine's, Kilburn, is a Church of England church in the area of Kilburn, in North London, England. Because of its large size and ornate architecture, it is sometimes affectionately referred to as "the Cathedral of North London", although the church is not a cathedral in any official sense.

== History ==
St Augustine's was founded by Richard Carr Kirkpatrick in the Anglo-Catholic tradition in 1870. By 1871, a foundation stone had been laid and the original "iron church" was subsequently replaced by a much more ambitious building, a Gothic Revival church designed by John Loughborough Pearson. It is listed as a Grade I building by Historic England.

== Architecture ==
Pearson's plans called for a red brick structure, vaulted ceilings, and extensive interior stone sculpture in a style reminiscent of 13th-century Gothic architecture. The church was consecrated in 1880, but the tower and spire, remarkable for such structures in the Victorian era, were not constructed until 1897–1898. Sir Giles Gilbert Scott designed the reredos (altar screens) for the high altar in 1930. He also designed the reredos of the Lady chapel and the Stations of the Cross. In 1878, two years prior to the dedication of the church, contemporary historian Edward Walford had already referred to St Augustine's, Kilburn, as "one of the finest examples of ecclesiastical structures in London."

The spire measures more than 77 metres (253 feet) high. Completed in 1878, the nave measures nine metres (30 ft) wide with nine bays and a crossing that is bounded by transepts on the north and south sides. The religious art in various forms depicts most of the major biblical stories. Clayton and Bell created the stained glass windows, which include a large rose window depicting the Creation, nine clerestory windows (five depicting types of angels), nave windows depicting saints connected with England, a window depicting Saint Augustine and several other tall lancet windows. Paintings around the nave depict the healing ministry of Christ. The chancel and sanctuary are surrounded by densely-carved sculptural forms representing the Passion, Crucifixion, Entombment, and Resurrection of Christ, as well as the Apostles, saints and other religious iconography. The south transept leads to St Michael's Chapel with depictions of the Eucharist, sacrifice, angels and the worship of Heaven. The Lady Chapel presents frescoes of the Christ child and a later carving of Christ's Presentation in the Temple.

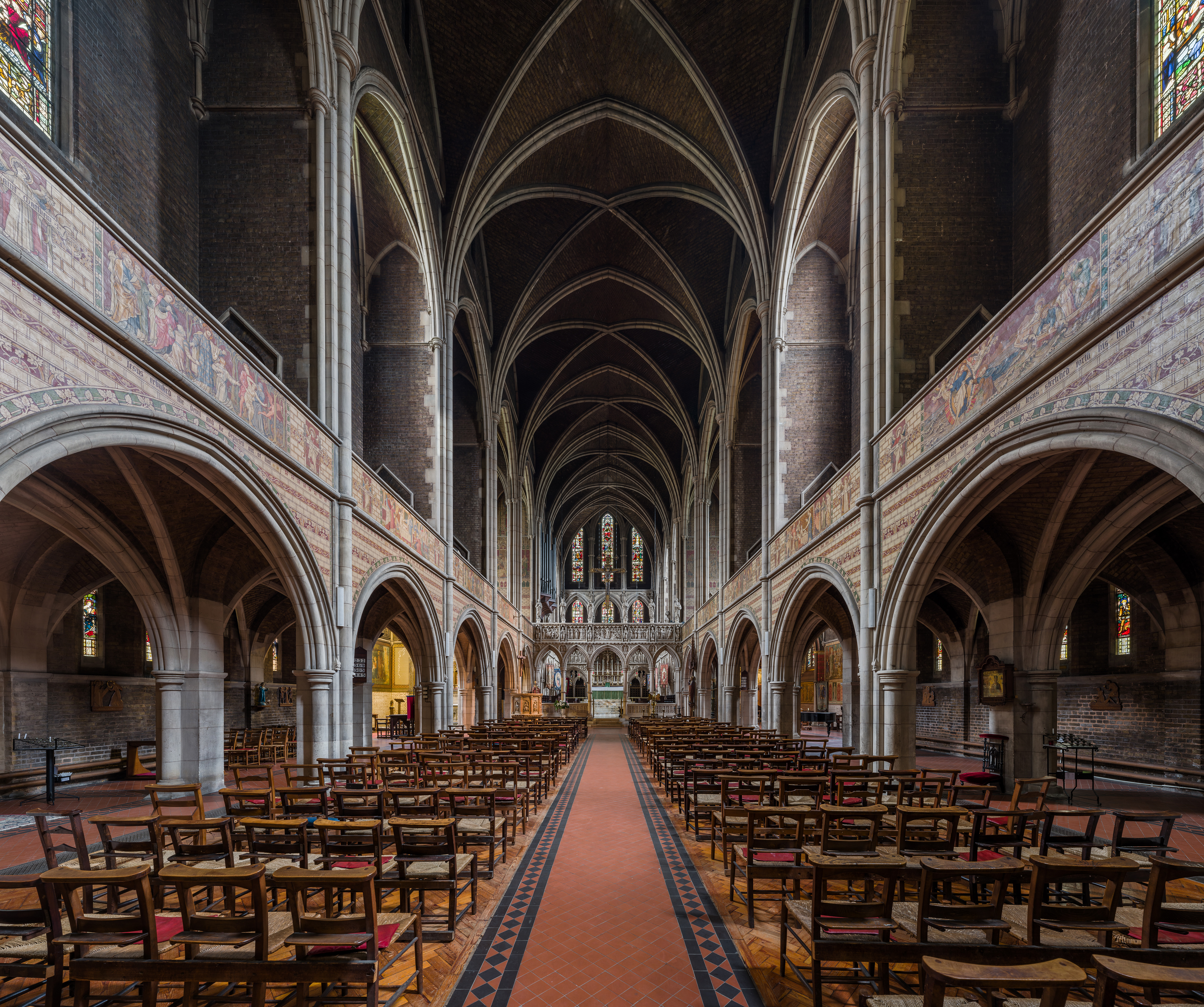
The nave (looking east)

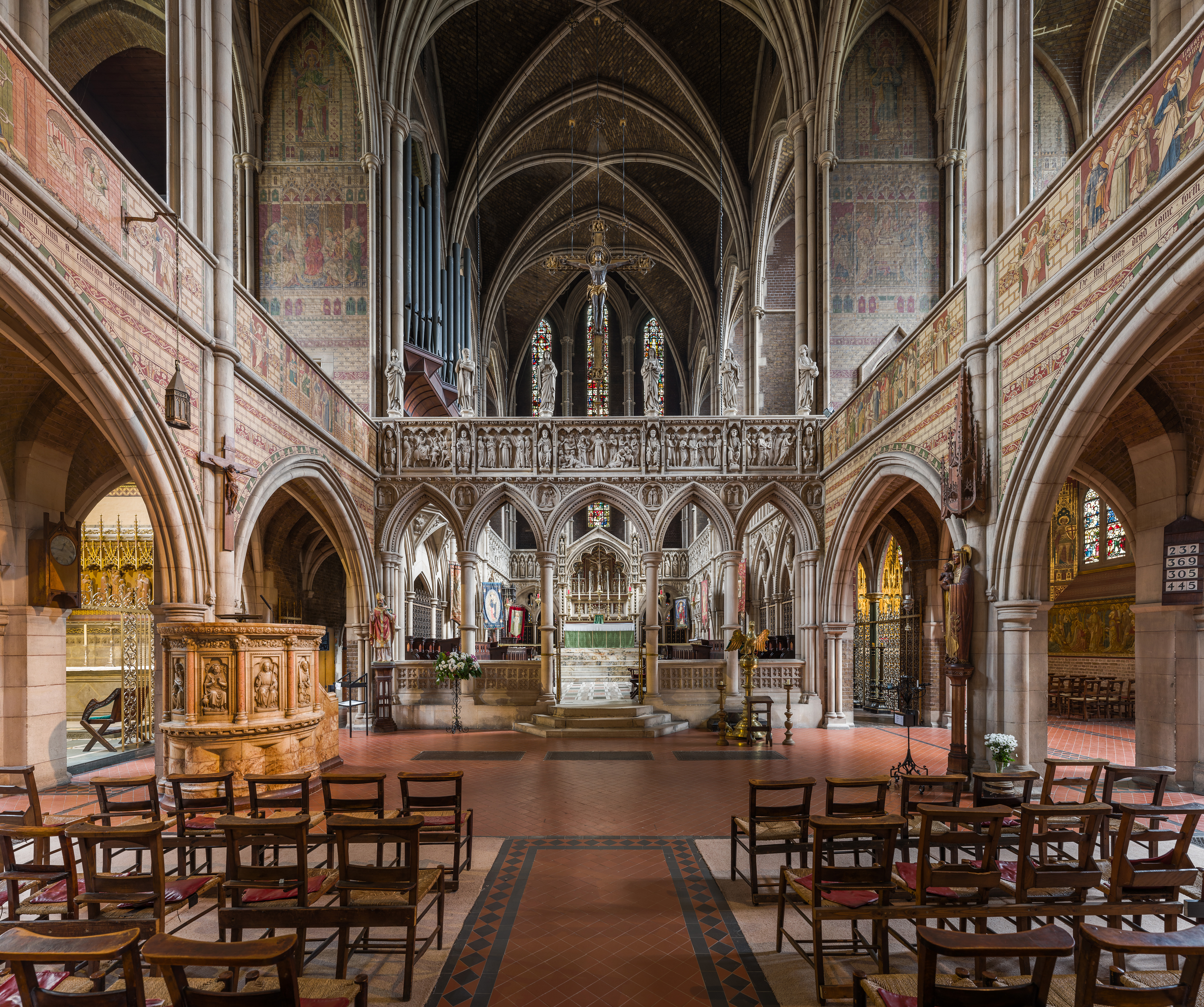
The rood screen

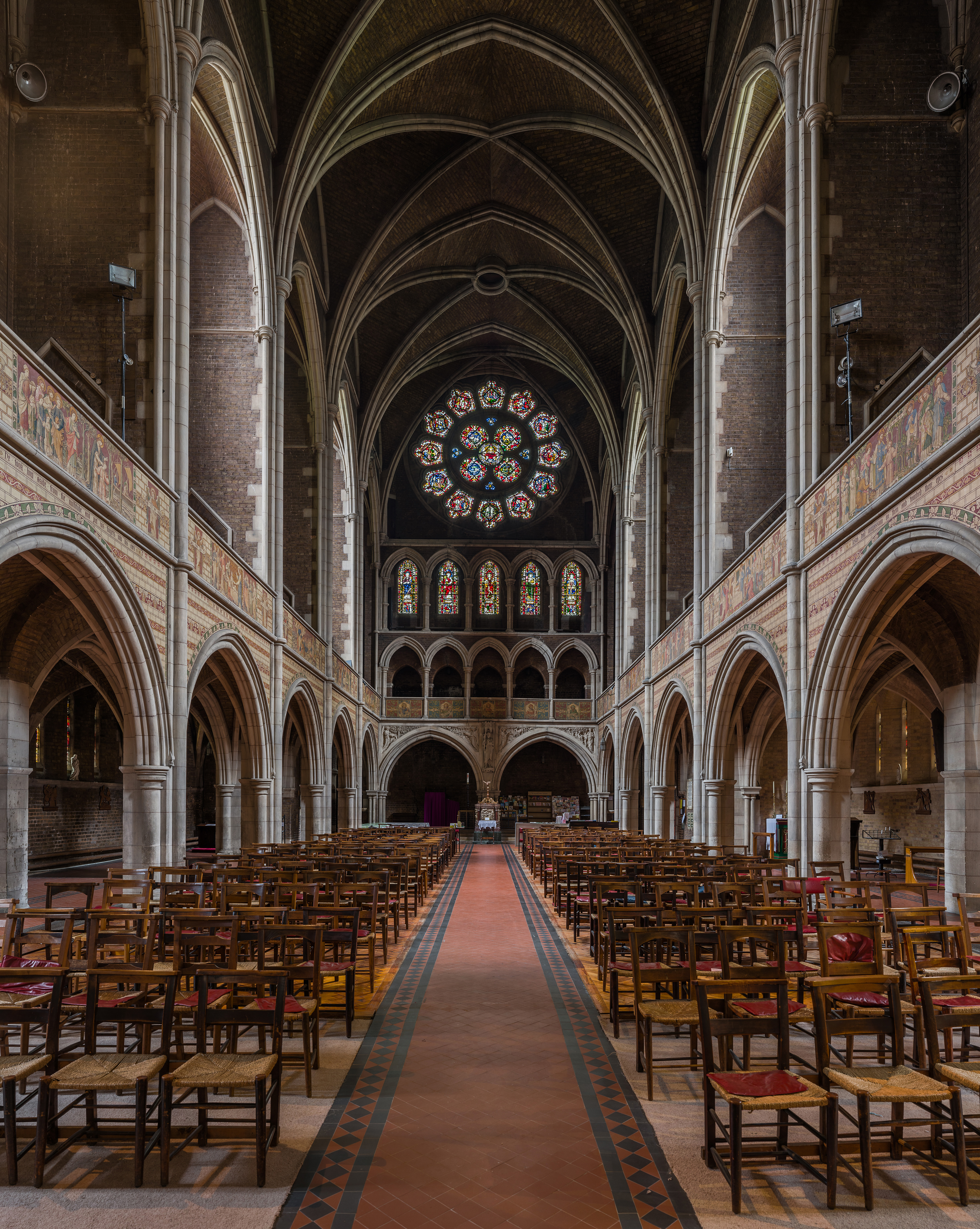
The nave (looking west)

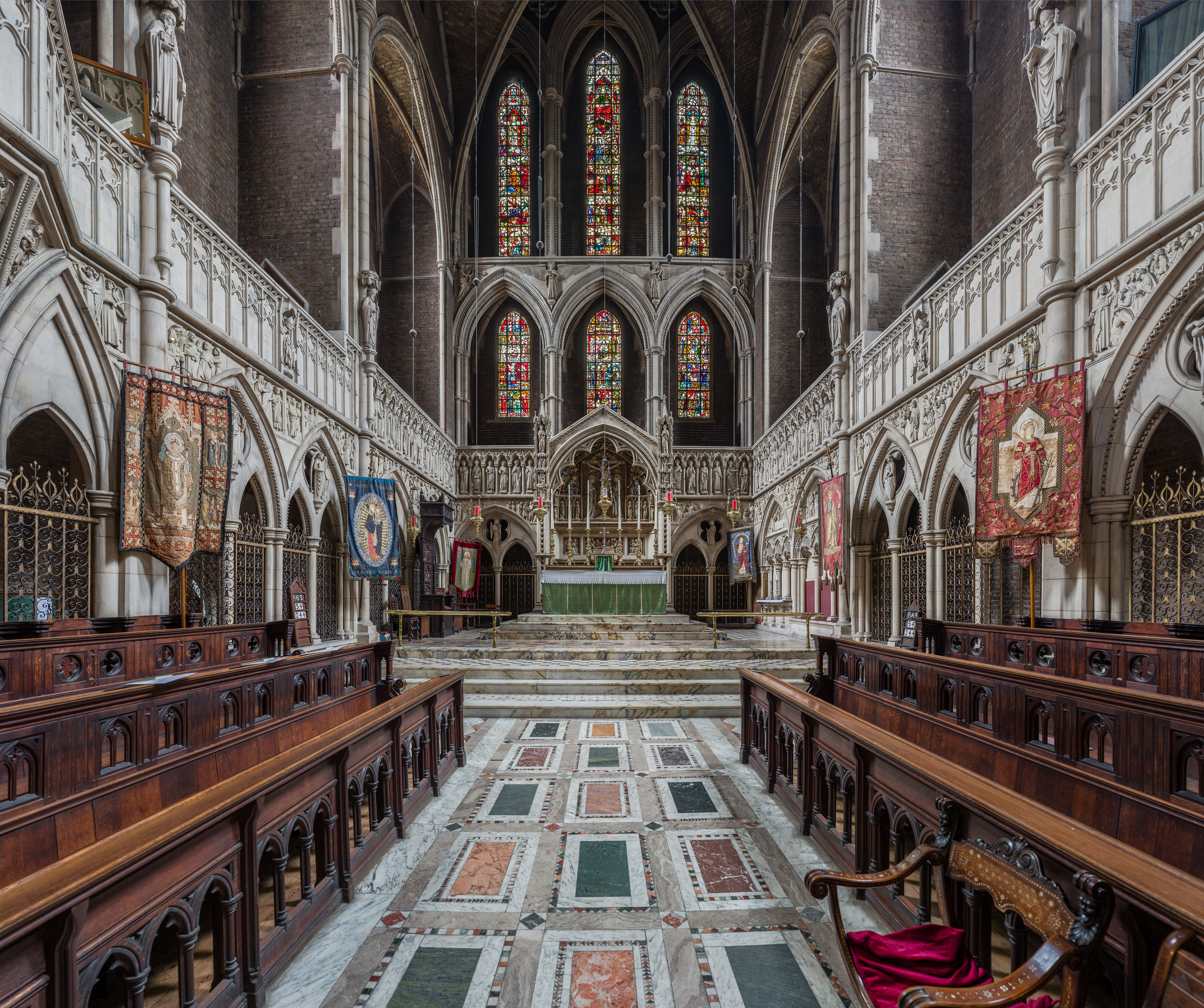
The sanctuary

== Today ==
The church stands prominently to the south of Kilburn and the north of Maida Vale. It has two schools, St Augustine's Primary School and St Augustine's High School.

== Congregational history ==
Richard Carr Kirkpatrick served as parish priest at Saint Augustine, Kilburn, from 1870 to 1907. He formed the church after his parish at St Mary's, Kilburn, where he served as curate, received an evangelical vicar unsympathetic to the Anglo-Catholic movement (also referred to as the Oxford Movement, "Tractarians" or disparagingly as "Puseyites" after one of the founders of the movement, Edward Bouverie Pusey). Kirkpatick clothed Emily Ayckbowm as the founding sister of the Community of the Sisters of the Church here in 1870. Kirkpatrick was followed in the vicarage by:

- Philip Leary, 1907–1930
- William Percy Theodore Atkinson, 1930–1954
- Harold Riley, 1955–1975
- Claude Eric Hampson, 1975–1977
- Raymond John Avent, 1977–1987
- Paul Tudor Rivers, 1987–1994
- Anthony Hugh Yates, 1995–2011
- Colin J. Amos, 2012– 2025
- Jason Rendell, 2025-present

== In popular culture ==
The interior of St Augustine's Church was used in the filming of Young Sherlock Holmes (1985), for the church of the Reverend Duncan Nesbitt (played by Donald Eccles). In the scene, Nesbitt is hit by a poison dart, and begins hallucinating about one of the stained glass figures (a knight) coming alive and trying to kill him. This knight is noted for being the first fully photorealistic animated character in any feature film.

St Augustine's Church was used to portray a New York church in the movie Highlander, for a scene in which Macleod (Christopher Lambert) and the Kurgan (Clancy Brown) meet on "holy ground" prior to their final battle.

The interior of St. Augustine’s Church was used in the 2024 season one finale "In the Bleak Midwinter", of the Netflix series Black Doves, as the location for a meeting between Helen Webb (Keira Knightley) and Reed (Sarah Lancashire) during a Christmas Eve service.

== Gallery ==
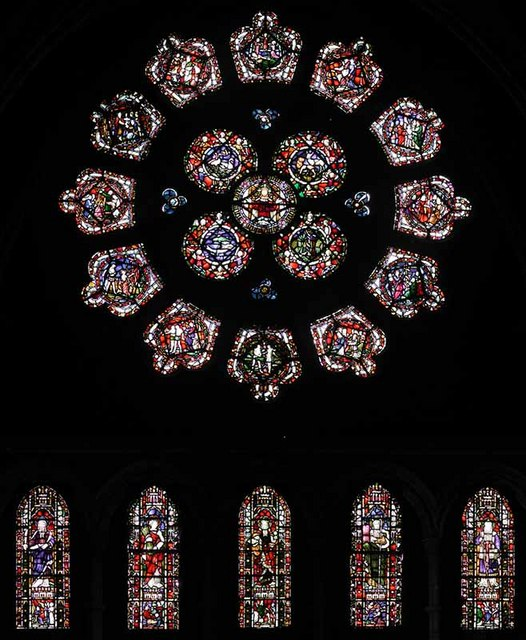
West rose window

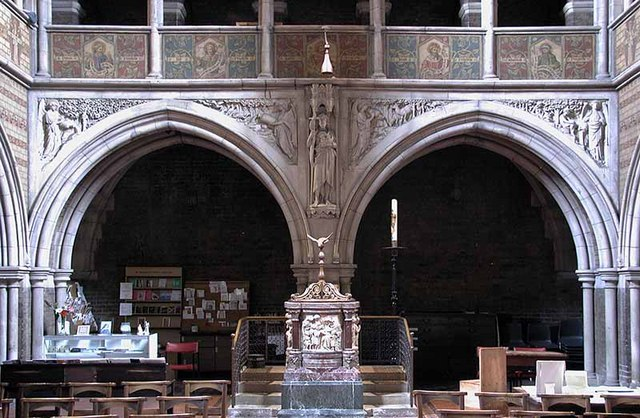
Western arcade

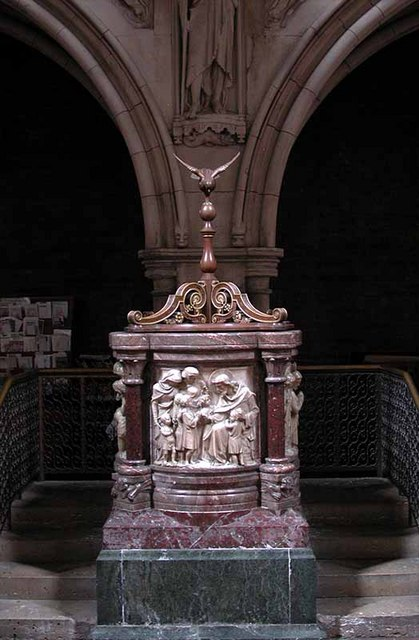
The font

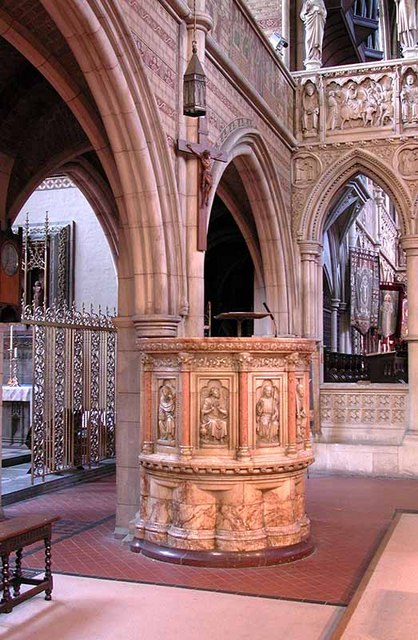
Pulpit

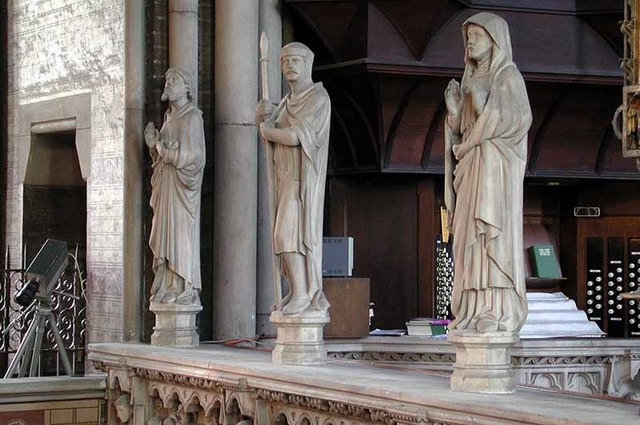
Statues on the Rood Screen

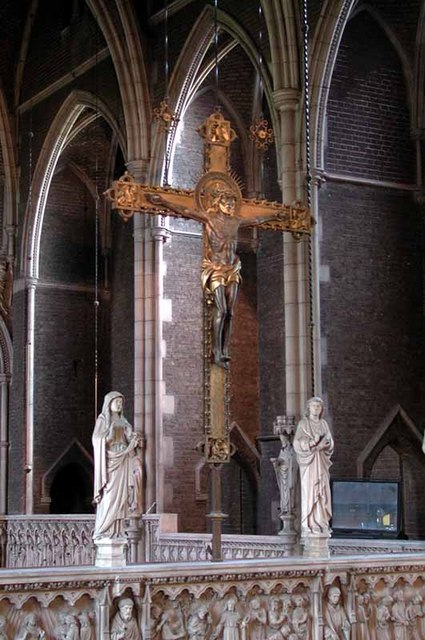
The Rood flanked by Saints Mary and John

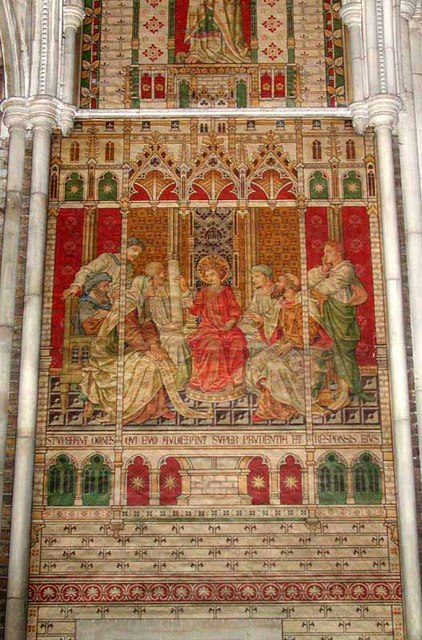
Painting north-west, Christ among the Doctors

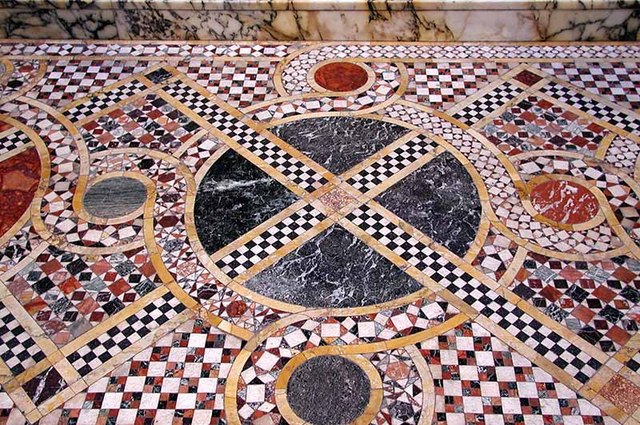
The sanctuary pavement

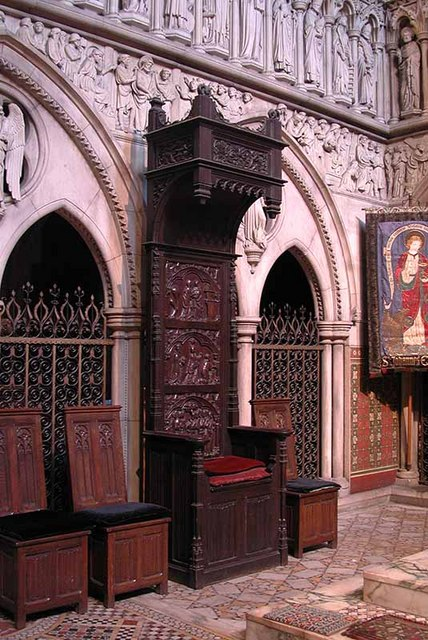
Throne in the sanctuary

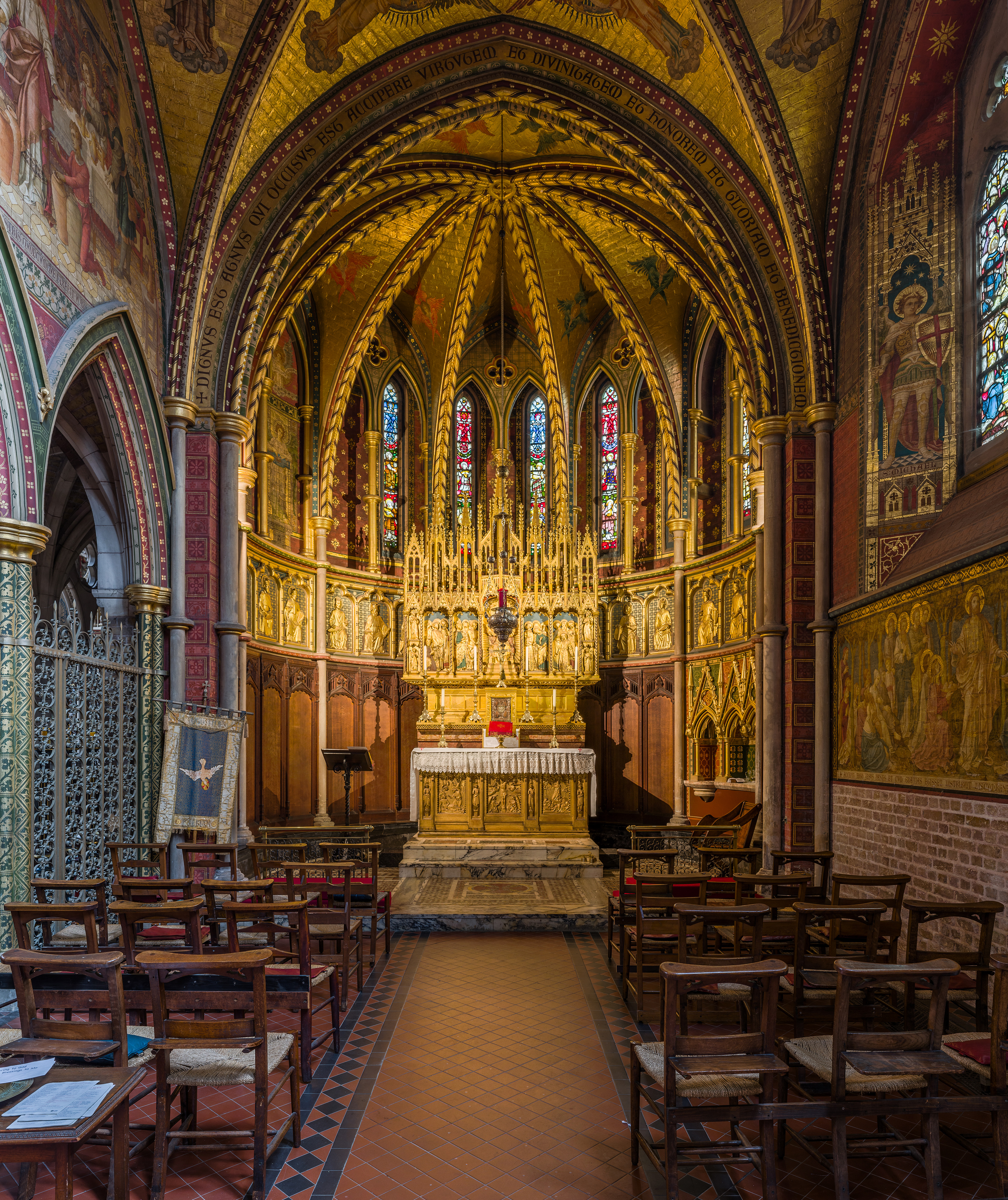
Chapel of St Michael

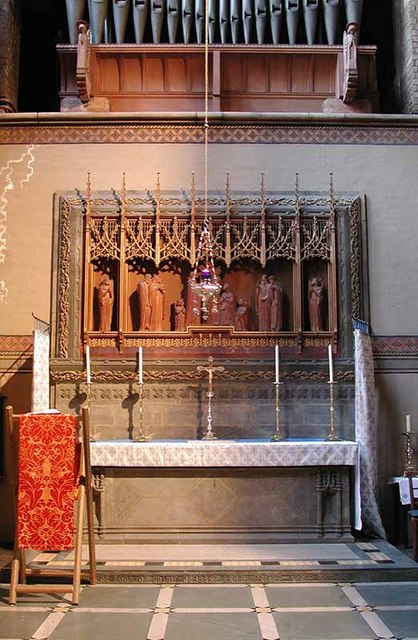
Altar in the Lady Chapel

== See also ==
- List of new ecclesiastical buildings by J. L. Pearson
