= St Michael's Grammar School =

Location
- 25 Chapel Street, St Kilda, Victoria; Australia; 37°51′34″S 144°59′28″E

Information
- Type: Independent co-educational primary and secondary day school
- Motto: Latin: Pro Ecclesia Dei (For the Church of God)
- Religious affiliations: Anglican Diocese of Melbourne; Community of the Sisters of the Church
- Denomination: Anglican
- Established: 1895; 131 years ago
- Chairman: Andrew Eddy
- Head of the School: Gerard Houlihan
- Staff: 225
- Years: K–12
- Gender: Co-educational
- Enrolment: 1,194
- Colours: Blue, red, white
- Slogan: Nurturing Creative, Inquiring Minds
- Affiliation: Association of Coeducational Schools; Junior School Heads Association of Australia
- Website: stmichaels.vic.edu.au

St Michael's Grammar School is an Australian independent Anglican co-educational primary and secondary day school located in the Melbourne suburb of St Kilda, Victoria.

St Michael's was founded in 1895 by the Community of the Sisters of the Church and remains in its original location on a single campus. The School is associated with the Anglican Diocese of Melbourne and is a member of the Association of Coeducational Schools (ACS) and the Junior School Heads Association of Australia.

The school educates students from 3-year-old kindergarten to the Victorian Certificate of Education (VCE), which all Year 12 students at St Michael's complete.

== History ==
=== Foundation ===
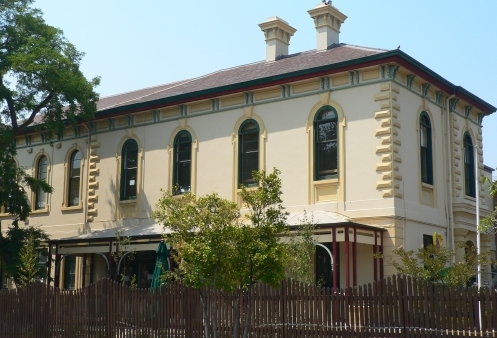
"Marlton" (now St Michael's House), an 1870s mansion which was purchased in 1892 during the depression and served as a boarding house between 1905 and 1975.

In 1870, Mother Emily Ayckbowm founded the Community of the Sisters of the Church, a new Anglican religious order. The order was invited to Australia to further educational work for girls, and St Michael's was one of six schools established in different parts of Australia. They also founded schools in England, New Zealand and Canada. The schools, known as The Emily Group, share the same crest, patron saint and founding narrative, however, they all differ in significant ways, which enriches the group’s diversity. St Michael’s is the sole coeducational school in the group. On 23 April 1895, in Marlton Crescent, St Kilda, the Sisters opened an advanced primary school: The Church of England Day School (now St Michael's).

=== 20th century ===
In 1972, St Michael’s Church of England Girls Grammar School Pty Ltd (later a company limited by guarantee) was established in 1972 to manage the School. The idea was put forward to make the school co-educational. In 1974 a coeducation subcommittee was established, and the School embarked on its coeducational journey. In 1980, with the appointment of a new Headmaster, Anthony Hewison, the decision was taken to admit boys to all levels of the school, thus making it fully coeducational, and to embark on modernising the school.

=== 21st century ===
With the arrival of Headmaster Simon Gipson in the year 2000, the School administration adopted new approaches, including introducing modern terminology, a new school uniform, and a six-stage building plan, including the Sisters of the Church Learning Centre and the new playing surface for the oval.

On 6 December 2007, St Michael's purchased the Astor Theatre building in St Kilda. The cinema continued to operate as usual, with films screening at nights and on weekends, while the building was often used by the school for assemblies and events on weekdays. On 24 August 2012 the school announced that it had sold the building to Ralph Taranto.

The sisters have retained their interest in the school but no longer play a part in its governance. The school is managed by a Head who is appointed by a board of directors.

== Academics ==
St Michael's offers a wide range of subjects including core mathematics, science, English, IT, LOTEs (Languages Other Than English), arts and humanities courses. At primary level, all students study basic subjects including mathematics, English, science, geography, history, Japanese, music and sport. The school is renowned for its Performing Arts program.

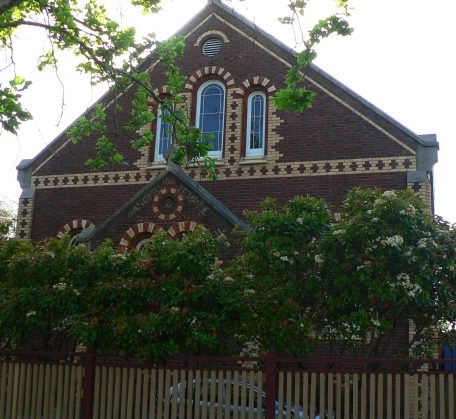
Masonic Hall in Crimea Street, built in 1876 as a Baptist church, was acquired by the school in 1995

== Sport ==
St Michael's is a member of the Association of Coeducational Schools (ACS).

=== ACS premierships ===
St Michael's has won the following ACS premierships since 1998.

OVERALL CHAMPIONS: (9) 2003, 2004, 2007, 2008, 2009, 2010, 2011, 2012, 2013

Sport Carnivals:

- Swimming (14) – 1998, 1999, 2001, 2002, 2003, 2004, 2007, 2008, 2009, 2010, 2011, 2012, 2013, 2014
- Athletics (10) – 2003, 2004, 2005, 2006, 2007, 2008, 2009, 2012, 2013, 2016
- Cross Country (7) – 2007, 2008, 2009, 2010, 2011, 2012, 2013

Combined:

- Badminton (6) – 2002, 2003, 2004, 2008, 2009, 2012
- Beach Volleyball (2) – 2013, 2017
- Chess (6) – 2004, 2005, 2006, 2008, 2021, 2022
- Public Speaking (4) – 2005, 2008, 2020, 2022

Boys:

- Basketball – 2008, 2022
- Cricket (4) – 1998, 1999, 2000, 2003
- Football (2) – 1998, 2012
- Hockey (8) – 2000, 2002, 2010, 2011, 2016, 2018, 2019, 2023
- Soccer (2) – 2013, 2026
- Softball (5) – 2000, 2006, 2008, 2013, 2017
- Table Tennis (10) – 1999, 2000, 2001, 2002, 2003, 2004, 2006, 2007, 2014, 2015
- Volleyball (15) – 2004, 2006, 2010, 2011, 2013, 2014, 2015, 2016, 2017, 2018, 2019, 2022, 2023, 2025, 2026

Girls:

- Basketball (3) – 1998, 2015, 2016
- Football – 2018
- Futsal – 2015
- Hockey (11) – 1998, 2000, 2012, 2013, 2014, 2015, 2016, 2017, 2018, 2019, 2026
- Netball – 2013
- Soccer (2) – 2006, 2007
- Softball (4) – 2010, 2016, 2017, 2018
- Volleyball (16) – 1999, 2005, 2006, 2008, 2009, 2010, 2012, 2013, 2014, 2017, 2018, 2022, 2023, 2024, 2025, 2026

== Performing arts ==
Each year the school puts on productions, including Years 10 to 12 senior musical; the Years 7 to 9 musical and play; Dance Project (a contemporary dance production); a student production; a house drama festival and three yearly senior productions (Year 6, Years 7–9, Years 10–12). In 2001, St Michael's was the first school to stage a production at Melbourne’s Athenaeum Theatre with the performance of Les Misérables. The 2010 senior musical, 13, was the Australian premiere of the musical and won the best production award at the Victorian Musical Theatre Guild awards (the fourth St Michael's musical to do so).

The St Michael's 2025 10-12 Quadrant's GREASE: The Musical has been recognised by the Music Theatre Guild of Victoria (MTGV) with 16 nominations and commendations.

St Michael's also conducts an annual house drama competition, and an annual house singing & aerobics competition, in which all five of the school houses perform a musical item. Many other musical ensembles perform regularly throughout the year, including the 7–12 Harrison Choir, which each year performs a large choral work, and the Grigoryan Orchestra (named for school alumnus, classical guitarist Slava Grigoryan).

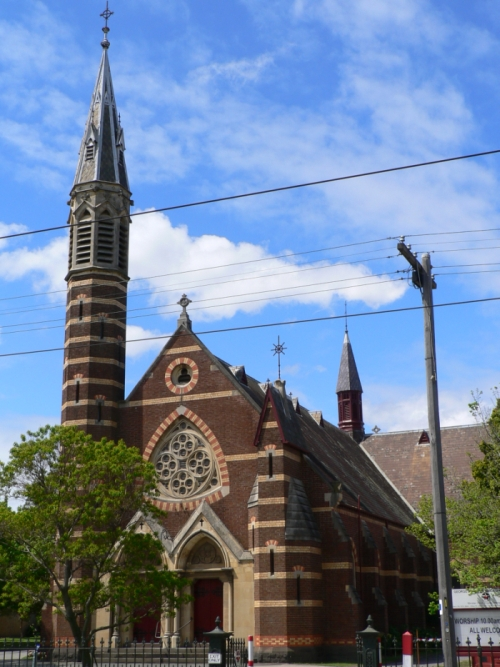
St George's Presbyterian Church. Leased by St Michael's Grammar since 1990.

In 2025, the school apologised for the descriptions of pupils in a cast list distributed to parents. Principal Gerard Houlihan addressed the issue in a radio interview.

== School of Rock ==
St Michael's has a "School of Rock" program, where students in Years 7–12 are mentored by rock musicians, leading to public performances and recordings.

The program is notable for being the origin of the Cheeky Geezers, a local rock band.

== Social service and charity work ==
The school is involved in social service, working to raise money for various charities.

Once or twice a term, a Community Action Day is held, organised by the social service captains of each house, to raise money for a diverse number of charities. Every year in May, a prefect-organised program, the 'Merry Month of May', is held to raise money for social initiatives.

== House system ==
The Junior School Houses (Years K–6) are Moss, Woods, Marlton and Cintra.

The Senior School Houses (Years 7–12) are Mitre, Sarum, Hughes, Kilburn and Breen. Mitre, Sarum, Hughes and Kilburn are the four original school houses and were all created in 1922, all significant for their own reasons. When the school started to grow a fifth senior school house, Breen was created in 1987. The pastoral care system is based on a house structure which deals with all matters relating to a student's wellbeing or curriculum needs. Each student is placed in a house tutorial group which is overseen by a house tutor. There are five houses and therefore five house tutorial groups at each year level. A house contains students from Years 7 to 12. Each house is led by two co-heads. The members of each house are led by co-house captains and co-vice-captains. The houses meet on a regular basis.

The house tutor and heads of house work as a team to monitor the academic and personal progress of each student in the house tutorial group and house. Generally, the house tutor is the first and main point of contact between the parent and the school.

== School leaders ==
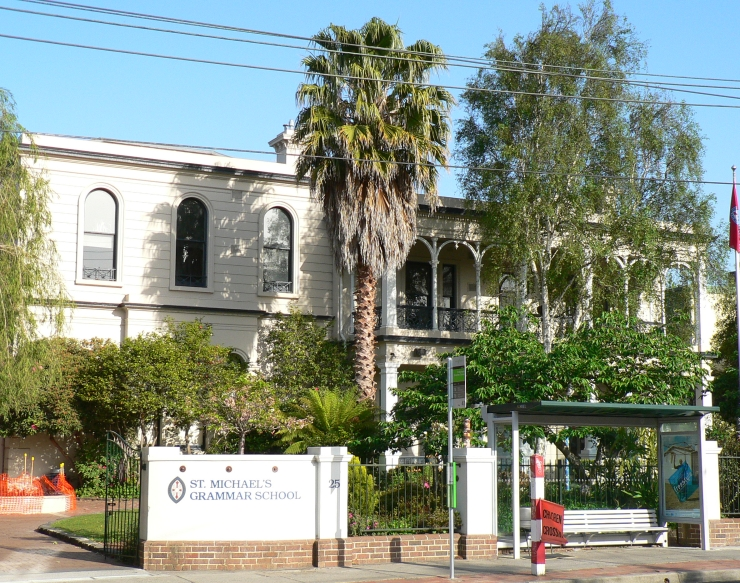
Hewison House, a former 1860s mansion was acquired by the school in 1988 and named after a former headmaster

=== Principal ===
The following individuals have served as the school principal:

Ordinal	Officeholder	Title	Term start	Term end	Time in office	Notes
1	Sister Hannah CSC	Principal	1895	1903	7–8 years	
2	Sister Adele CSC	Principal	1903	1912	8–9 years	
3	Sister Mildred CSC	Principal	1912	1925	12–13 years	
4	Sister Persis CSC	Principal	1925	1933	7–8 years	
5	Sister Dora Beatrice CSC	Principal	1934	1939	4–5 years	
6	Sister Eudora CSC	Principal	1939	1944	4–5 years	
7	Sister Karina CSC	Principal	1945	1949	3–4 years	
8	Sister Shirley CSC	Principal	1950	1952	1–2 years	
9	Sister Gabrielle CSC	Principal	1953	1954	0–1 years	
10	Sister Patricia CSC	Principal	1955	1963	7–8 years	
11	Sister Scholastica CSC	Principal	1963	1966	2–3 years	
–	Sister Gabrielle CSC	Principal	1966	1967	0–1 years	
–	Sister Scholastica CSC	Principal	1967	1968	0–1 years	
12	Sister Elizabeth May CSC	Principal	1968	1970	1–2 years	
–	Sister Scholastica CSC	Principal	1971	1972	0–1 years	

=== Head of the school ===
The following individuals have served as the head of the school or any previous title:

Ordinal	Officeholder	Title	Term start	Term end	Time in office	Notes
1	May Vicars Foote	Headmistress	1937	1946	8–9 years	
2	Dorothy Benson	Headmistress	1963	1965	1–2 years	
3	Margaret Thomas	Headmistress	1965	1979	13–14 years	
4	Anthony Hewison AM	Headmaster	1980	1999	18–19 years	
5	Simon Gipson OAM	Head of the School	2000	2017	16–17 years	
6	Terrie Jones	Head of the School	2018	2022	7–8 years	
6	Gerard Houlihan	Head of the School	2022	present	3–4 years	

== Notable alumni ==
- Marjorie McQuade, represented Australia at the 1948 Summer Olympics at London and the 1952 Summer Olympics at Helsinki
- Marie Breen, politician
- Philip Dalidakis, politician
- Slava Grigoryan, guitarist
- Joy Hester, artist
- Isabel Huntington, footballer and former AFL Women's No. 1 draft pick
- Asher Keddie, actress
- Samantha Lane, TV presenter
- Faith Leech, Olympic swimmer, gold and bronze medalist at the 1956 Olympic Games in Melbourne, Australia
- Andrew MacLeod, former United Nations humanitarian expert and former CEO of the Committee for Melbourne
- Eloise Mignon, actress
- Radha Mitchell, actress
- Frances Newson, hockey player
- Anna O'Byrne, singer
- Jan Skubiszewski, member of Jackson Jackson
- Dan Spielman, actor
- Nora Sumberg, artist
- Brodie Summers, Olympic Mogul skier and World Cup silver medalist
- Winnie Laing, AFL Women's footballer
- Sean Wroe, Australian sprinter, silver medalist in the 2010 Commonwealth Games in Delhi, India. Wroe also represented Australia at the 2006 Commonwealth Games, 2008 Olympic Games in Beijing.
- Tess Coady, Olympic snowboarder, bronze medalist at the 2022 Winter Olympics in Beijing, China
- Elena Galiabovitch, Australian shooter, Women's 10-metre air pistol bronze medalist at the 2018 Commonwealth Games. Galiabovitch has represented Australia in both the 2016 Rio Olympics and the 2020 Tokyo Olympics. Elena was selected to be by the International Olympic Committee as one of six athletes to carry the Olympic flag at the Games opening ceremony in Tokyo.
- Col Pearse, Paralympic Swimmer, bronze medalist at the 2021 Paralympics in Tokyo, Japan
- Chris Watts, Visual Artist, painted a portrait of Mitch Brown which was a finalist for the Archibald Prize
- Erol Mujanovic, Volleyball Player, represented Slovenia at the 2024 Summer Olympics

== See also ==
- List of schools in Victoria
- List of high schools in Victoria
- Victorian Certificate of Education
