= Manyiel Wugol =

South Sudanese-Australian professional basketball player (born 1999)

No. 24 – Southern Tigers
- Position: Shooting guard
- League: NBL1

Personal information
- Born: 24 January 1999 (age 27) Rumbek, South Sudan
- Listed height: 6 ft 6 in (1.98 m)
- Listed weight: 200 lb (91 kg)

Career information
- High school: Thomas Carr College (Melbourne, Victoria); Believe Prep Academy (Athens, Tennessee)
- College: Southwestern Iowa CC (2019–2021); ASA (2021–2022); Florida National (2022)
- Playing career: 2023–present

Career history
- 2023–2025: South West Slammers
- 2025-present: Southern Tigers

Career highlights
- 2x Club Defensive Player of the Year (2023, 2026)

Manyiel Majak Ater Wugol (born 24 January 1999) is a South Sudanese-Australian professional basketball player who plays for Southern Tigers in the NBL1.

== Early life ==
Manyiel Wugol was born in Rumbek, South Sudan. His family fled the war-torn South Sudan and escaped to Kakuma refugee camp where they waited to be granted their visas and immigrated to Perth, Australia when he was two years old.

Wugol started playing basketball at the late age of 16, growing up he mainly took interest in soccer, australian rules football and boxing. Wugol attended Caramarr Primary School and Thomas Carr College for high school. Wugol was drawn to basketball due to his older brother and cousins playing the game. His family relocated from Perth to Melbourne and he grew a large interest in basketball.

== High school career ==
Wugol attended Lake Joondalup Baptist College in Perth from year 7 to year 9. He transferred to Thomas Carr College when his family moved to Melbourne. In his first year on the varsity squad, He led the team to a championship in the Association of Co-educational School (ACS) basketball winter league. He played his grassroots basketball for South Sudanese basketball club Perth Rhinos and Melbourne based Longhorns, who has produced many South Sudanese-Australian college and professional players .

in 2017, two years after he started playing the game of basketball he enrolled at Believe prep in Athens, Tennessee on an athletic scholarship.

== College career ==
=== Southwestern Community College (2019–2021) ===
In August 2019, Wugol signed to Southwestern Community College who compete in the Iowa Community College Athletic Conference. Wugol made his college debut on November 1 against Independence Community College.

=== Long Beach State (2021) ===
On 3 June, Wugol Committed to Long Beach State Beach program but did not get eligible to play for the Beach and had to enter the transfer portal.

=== ASA College (2021–2022) ===
Wugol attended ASA college after not being academically eligible at Long Beach State. He appeared in 13 games making 6 starts, averaging 6.0 points per game with a season high of 18 points.

=== Florida National University (2022) ===
Wugol signed with the Florida National Conquistadors program. He only appeared in 1 game before making the decision to turn professional.

== Professional career ==
=== South West Slammers (2023–2025) ===
On February 10, 2023, Wugol signed with the South West Slammers. On April 1, he made his debut against Geraldton Buccaneers scoring 17 points, 4 rebounds, 2 assists and 2 steals. Wugol chose to wear number 15 for the season to honor a late friend who was murdered a year prior. Wugol finished the season averaging 11.25 points per game and named the South West Slammers' Defensive Player of the Year. Following the 2023 season, Manyiel Wugol re-signed with South West Slammers for 2024 NBL1 West season. In the opening round of the season on March 28 he scored 13 points against Rockingham Flames.. Wugol finished the season averaging 8.73 points per game. In 2025, Wugol re-signed with the South West Slammers for another season in the NBL1 West. He finished the 2025 season averaging 7.81 points per game..

=== Southern Tigers (2025-Present) ===
In November 2025, Wugol signed with the Southern Tigers of NBL1 Central ahead of the 2026 season. Wugol was named the Southern Tigers' Defensive Player of the Year.

== Personal life ==
Wugol has three brothers and five sisters. He is a descendant of the Dinka tribe of South Sudan. Wugol is the cousin of basketball players Makur Maker and Thon Maker.
