= Westbourne Grammar School =

Location
- Truganina, Victoria; Australia; 37°50′59″S 144°43′17″E

Information
- Type: Independent, co-educational
- Motto: Age Quod Agas (That Which You Do, Do Well)
- Denomination: Non-denominational
- Established: 1867
- Principal: Adrian Camm
- Years offered: K–12
- Gender: Co-educational
- Enrolment: ~1,700 (P–12)
- Colours: Blue, green, gold
- Affiliation: Association of Coeducational Schools
- Website: westbournegrammar.com

Westbourne Grammar School is an Australian independent co-educational day school in Truganina, a western suburb of Melbourne, Victoria. Westbourne has two campuses.

== History ==
The larger campus, opened in 1978, is located on Sayers Road in Truganina and offers classes for students at all levels, kindergarten to the Victorian Certificate of Education (VCE). A smaller campus is situated in nearby Williamstown and provides education for students up to and including Year 4. Amici ELC provides childcare and kindergarten at the Truganina campus.

In 2017, the school celebrated its 150th anniversary. The sesquicentenary year also included rebranding of the school logo.

== School structure ==
The total enrolment is approximately 2,230 students, with 1,200 at secondary level (Years 7 to 12). Most students come from suburbs in the west of Melbourne, from Werribee and Hoppers Crossing, to Newport and Williamstown, to Sydenham and St Albans, to Footscray and Maribyrnong.

== Extracurricular activities ==
=== Sport ===
Westbourne participates in the Association of Co-Educational Schools (ACS) in the senior school, where they play in weekly sport as well as carnivals (swimming, athletics, cross country, public speaking, chess and girls' football).

=== ACS Championships ===
Westbourne has won the following ACS premierships since 1998.

Sport Carnivals:

Athletics (6) – 2010, 2011, 2015, 2017, 2021, 2023

Cross Country (5) – 2017, 2018, 2019, 2022, 2023

==== Summer ====
- Cricket (boys)
- Futsal (boys)
- Hockey (boys)
- Netball (girls)
- Soccer (girls)
- Softball (girls and boys)
- Table Tennis (boys)
- Tennis (girls)
- Touch Rugby (mixed)
- Volleyball (girls)

==== Winter ====
- Australian Rules Football (boys)
- Australian Rules Football (girls)
- Badminton (mixed)
- Basketball (girls)
- Beach Volleyball (mixed)
- Futsal (girls)
- Hockey (girls)
- Netball (girls)
- Soccer (boys)
- Softball (boys)
- Table Tennis (girls)
- Tennis (boys)
- Volleyball (boys)

== Campus ==
The school has sporting facilities including a Sports and Aquatic Centre (25mtr and learn to swim pools, dance studio and gym) two full sized football ovals, all weather soccer fields, and tennis courts.

== Notable alumni ==
- Jimmy Jeggo – Socceroo
- Shannon Corcoran – AFL footballer
- Lydia Lassila – Winter Olympics gold medal winner
- Bella Paige – runner up of the Voice Kids Australia 2014, Australian entrant to Junior Eurovision 2015 and runner up of The Voice Australia 2018
- Julian Knight – Australian mass murderer

== Former headteachers ==
The principal of Westbourne is Adrian Camm. He has held the position since 2022 and is the fourth principal of the school.

== See also ==
- List of schools in Victoria
- List of high schools in Victoria
