= Thomas Carr College =

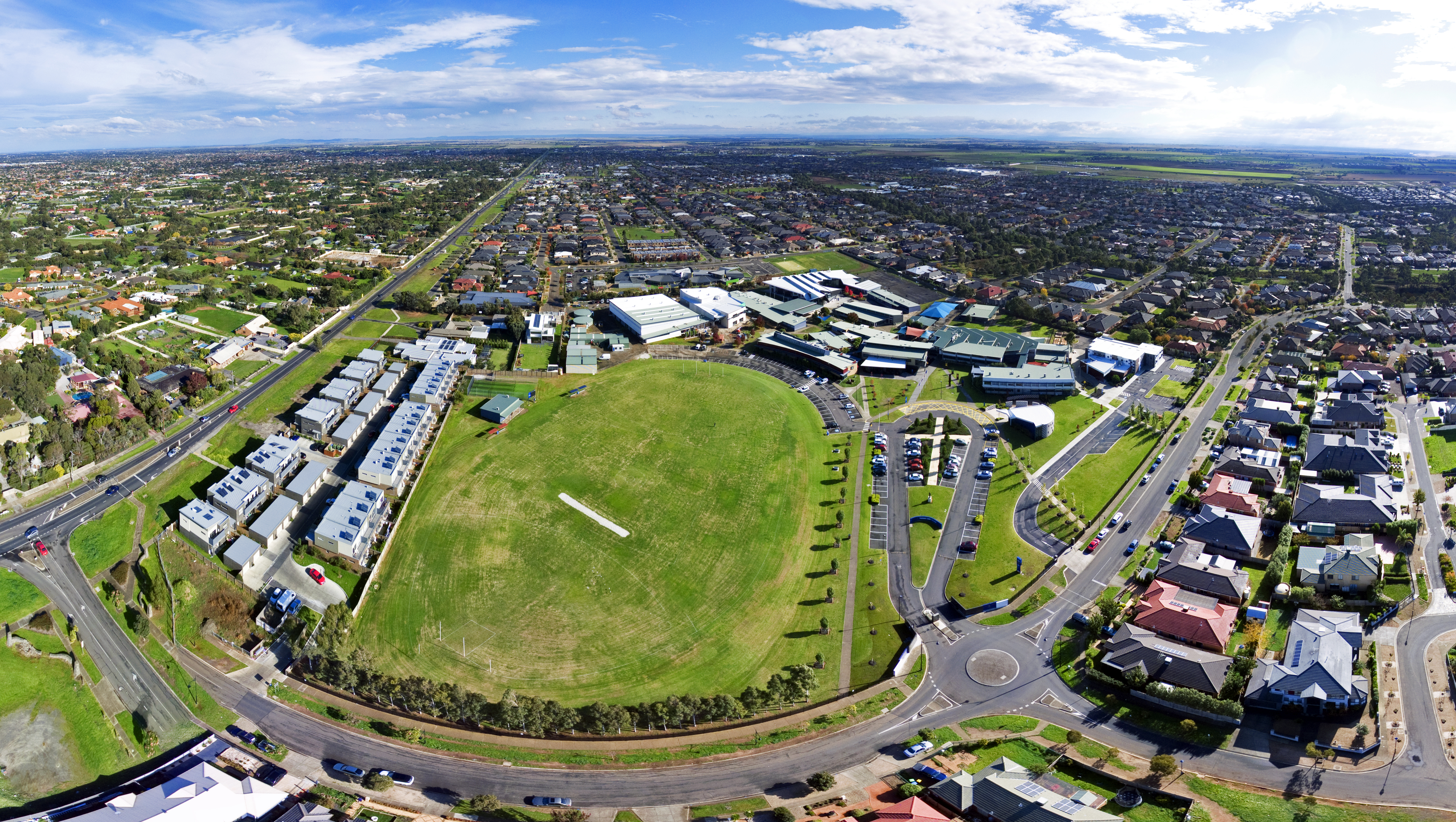
- An aerial panorama of Thomas Carr College, in 2017

Location
- 35 Thomas Carr Drive; Tarneit, Victoria 3029; Australia; 37°50′50″S 144°42′1″E

Information
- School type: Catholic school
- Motto: They Will Shine
- Denomination: Roman Catholic
- Established: 1997; 29 years ago
- Principal: Rose Connolly
- Grades: 7–12
- Gender: Co-educational
- Campus: Suburban
- Campus size: 10 hectares (25 acres)
- Colours: Navy blue and white
- Publication: The Beacon
- Newspaper: The Beacon'
- School fees: $4,980 per annum + $550 family levy fee
- Affiliation: Sports Association of Catholic Coeducational Secondary Schools (SACCSS)
- Website: thomascarr.vic.edu.au

Thomas Carr College is a Roman Catholic co-educational day school in Tarneit, Victoria, Australia. It is named after Thomas Joseph Carr, the second Roman Catholic Archbishop of Melbourne.

== School principals ==
In 2006, the principal since the College's founding, Paul D'Astoli, was transferred and succeeded by Bruce Runnalls. Runnalls died in office in 2011 and was succeeded by Andrew Watson until December 2018, when he resigned. Craig Holmes took over the role as college principal from January 2019 to 2020, before the role was passed to Jamie Madigan until 23 June 2023. Rose Connolly currently holds the position as of 2023.

== Sport ==
Thomas Carr College is a member of the Sports Association of Catholic Co-educational Secondary Schools (SACCSS) since 2019 and a former member of the Association of Co-educational School (ACS) sporting competition from 2003-2018.

=== ACS premierships ===
Thomas Carr College won the following ACS premierships.

Combined:

- Beach Volleyball – 2018
- Touch Football (3) – 2008, 2010, 2011

Boys:

- Hockey (2) – 2015, 2016
- Basketball (7) – 2005, 2006, 2007, 2010, 2011, 2017, 2019
- Cricket (3) – 2011, 2015, 2017
- Soccer – 2005
- Softball (6) – 2004, 2005, 2007, 2010, 2011, 2012
- Table Tennis – 2005
- Tennis – 2015

Girls:

- Football (3) – 2012, 2014, 2015
- Hockey – 2011
- Netball (3) – 2006, 2008, 2009
- Softball (3) – 2007, 2008, 2009

== Houses ==
There are four houses at Thomas Carr College. They are the Galway (yellow), the Moylough (blue), Maynooth (red) and Westport (green). All are named after towns in Ireland and are significant places in Thomas Carr's life.

== Controversy ==
In 2002 it was reported that some Year 8 students were given money from male students to perform sexual acts.

In 2003, a Year 9 student committed suicide after being bullied at school camp. The resulting controversy led to widespread bullying awareness, and the state government introduced various reforms.

In 2005, the school established a "wireless bully button" system which alerts teachers by SMS when students push the button and records incidents via a network of 20 video cameras.

In 2011, a muck-up prank by thirteen (13) Year-12 students caused approximately $30,000 in damages. (Note: There were a series of 3 schools pranked, with the total damages reaching $45,000. The damages at Thomas Carr College were estimated at $30,000.) The students were required to pay for the damages and were allowed to sit for their final exams.

== Notable alumni ==
- Michael Czepil – basketball coach
- Dante Exum – basketball player
- Manyiel Wugol – basketball player

== See more ==
- List of schools in Victoria
- List of high schools in Victoria
- Victorian Certificate of Education
