= Loyola College, Melbourne =

Secondary school in Melbourne, Australia

Loyola College
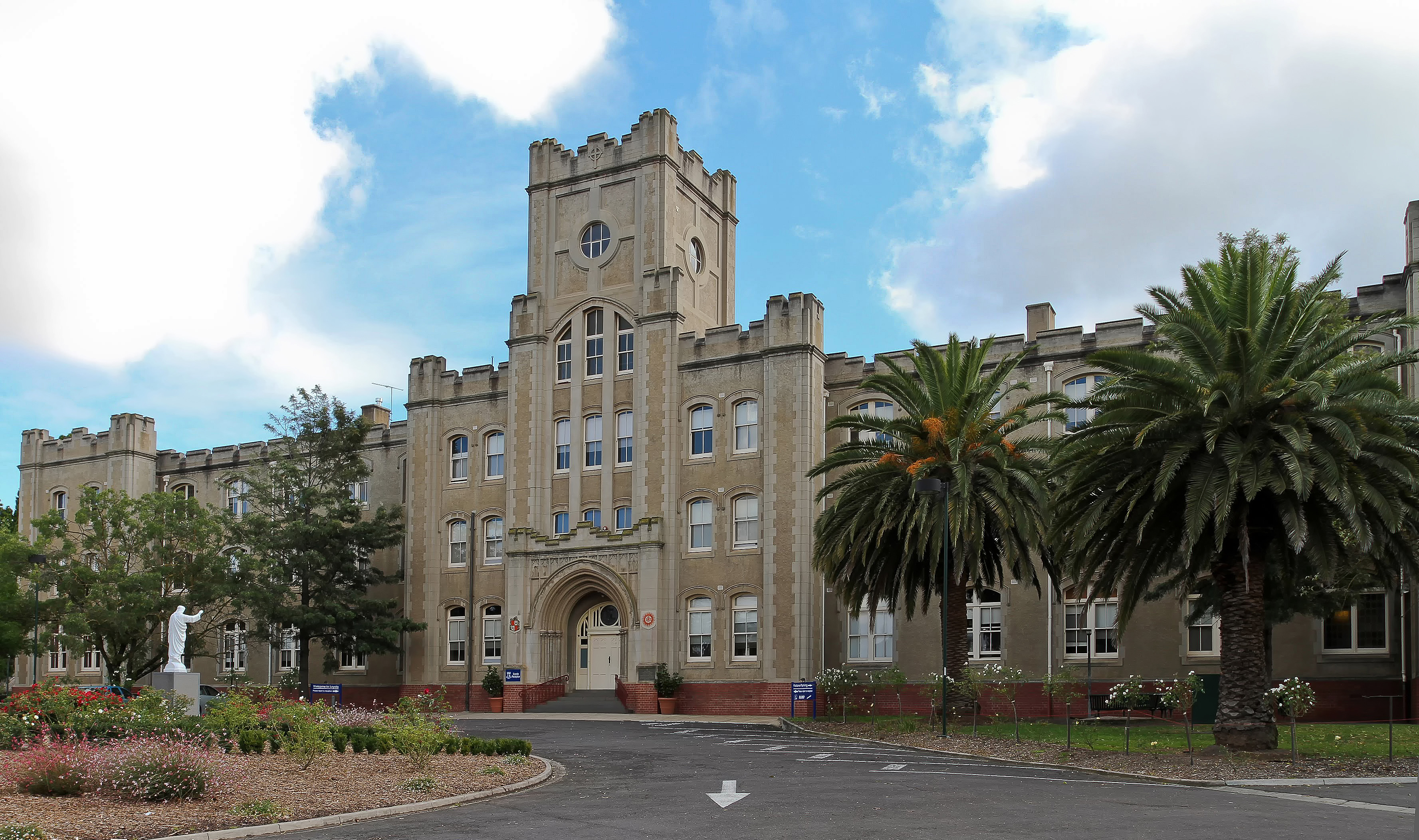
- Façade of Loyola College

Location
- 325 Grimshaw Street; Watsonia, Melbourne, Victoria; Australia; 37°42′15″S 145°04′43″E

Information
- Type: Independent secondary school
- Motto: Justice, Mercy, Faith
- Religious affiliation: Catholicism
- Denomination: Jesuits
- Patron saint: Ignatius Loyola
- Established: 1980; 46 years ago
- Founder: John Ormond Kennedy
- Principal: Alison Leutchford
- Grades: 7–12
- Gender: Co-educational
- Enrolment: 1,360
- Campus: Suburban
- Area: 10.9 hectares (27 acres)
- Colours: Blue, maroon and light blue
- School fees: $7,162 – $7,780
- Affiliation: Association of Coeducational Schools
- Website: www.loyola.vic.edu.au

Loyola College is an independent Catholic secondary school, located in Watsonia, a suburb of Melbourne, in Victoria, Australia. The college was founded by the Society of Jesus in 1980 with an initial enrolment of 134 students. The Jesuits conduct the school in the Ignatian tradition. Located on 11 hectares (27 acres), as of 2020, Loyola College had a student population of approximately 1,360 students from Year 7 to Year 12.

== History ==
The Loyola Seminary built between 1932 and 1934 was located at the corner of Bungay and Grimshaw Streets, Watsonia. After being owned by various parties over the years, the land was bought by John Kennedy in 1979, and formally opened as a school the next year.

== Structure ==
A regional Catholic college, Loyola's associated parishes are St Damian's, Bundoora; Sacred Heart, Diamond Creek; St Mary's, Greensborough; Our Lady of the Way, Kingsbury, St Martin of Tours’, Macleod; St Francis of Assisi, Mill Park and St Thomas’, North Greensborough. The college also serves the parishes of St Francis Xavier, Montmorency, including Holy Trinity, Eltham North and Our Lady Help of Christians, Eltham.

Each staff member and student belongs to one of the seven houses (The 7th house was added at the start of 2026): Chisholm, named after Caroline Chisholm; Flynn, named after John Flynn; McAuley, named after the Venerable Mother Catherine McAuley; MacKillop, named after Saint Mary MacKillop; Mannix, named after Archbishop Daniel Mannix; and Xavier, named after St. Francis Xavier. In 2026, a new house named Acutis house was added. All houses compete with each other through sports, theatre and more, in order to gain the most points and win the House Shield, which is awarded annually.

== Past principals ==
John Ormond Kennedy was the founding principal in September 1979. Joseph Favrin was the principal from 2008 until June 2022. Alison Leutchford was temporarily acting principal before officially being appointed principal in July 2024.

== Curriculum ==
The college offers a range of subjects including arts, Design and Technology, English, Humanities, Language, Mathematics, Music, Physical and Outdoor Education and Science. Loyola College also offers extra curricular activities including Clubs and Societies, Performing Arts, Public speaking and Debating, Service and Spirituality, and Sport. Major events during the school year include St Ignatius Day, the Musical Production and Dramatic Production, House Drama, House Music, House Chess, Athletics Carnival and Swimming Carnival.

== Sport ==
Loyola is a member of the Association of Coeducational School (ACS). Loyola has won the following ACS premierships:

Combined

- Touch Football – 2012

Boys

- Basketball – 2020
- Cricket (2) – 2019, 2020
- Football (3) – 1999, 2001, 2013
- Volleyball (2) – 2002, 2003

Girls

- Basketball (8) – 2003, 2006, 2007, 2008, 2010, 2019, 2021, 2022
- Football (6) – 2008, 2009, 2010, 2011, 2016, 2017
- Futsal (3) – 2016, 2017, 2019
- Netball (4) – 1999, 2005, 2007, 2012
- Soccer (3) – 2016, 2017, 2018
- Softball (4) – 2013, 2014, 2015, 2020
- Tennis (4) – 1998, 2005, 2008, 2014
- Volleyball – 2003

== Partnerships ==
The school has a partnership with Jesus Good Shepherd School in the Philippines.

== Notable alumni ==
- Jasmine Curtis – actress, dancer, endorser, writer and commercial model
- Jack Grimes – Australian rules football player for Melbourne Demons
- Dylan Grimes – Australian rules football player for Richmond Tigers
- Matthew Kreuzer – Australian rules football player for Carlton Blues
- Ben Lennon – Australian rules football player for Richmond Tigers
- Alicia Loxley – news reporter
- Richard Muscat – racing driver
- Sarah Sansonetti – Australian rules football player for Richmond Tigers
- Heath Shaw – Australian rules football player for Collingwood Mapgies and GWS Giants
- Rhyce Shaw – Australian rules football player for Sydney Swans; coach of North Melbourne Kangaroos
- Rebecca Privitelli – Australian rules football player for Sydney Swans, Carlton Blues and GWS Giants
- Jiordan Tolli – singer and actress
- Sam Philp – Australian rules football player for Carlton Blues
- Jesse Baird – television presenter and Australian rules football goal umpire

== Victorian Certificate of Education results ==
- 2023: DUX Pio Abi Raad (97.30 ATAR) and PROXIME ACCESSIT Gabrielle Liew (94.20 ATAR)
- 2022: DUX Alysha Prisc (99.45 ATAR) and PROXIME ACCESSIT Kelly Tran (99.40 ATAR)
- 2021: DUX Matthew Stanton (99.45 ATAR) and PROXIME ACCESSIT Callista Nguyen (99.00 ATAR)
- 2020: DUX Mary Tomasiello (99.15 ATAR) and PROXIME ACCESSIT Loujine Azmay (98.25 ATAR)

== Controversies ==
Joseph Favrin, the Loyola College principal between 2008 and 2022, stepped down after his teaching license was stripped from accusations of sexual offenses.

== See also ==
- Catholic education in Australia
- List of non-government schools in Victoria, Australia
- List of Jesuit schools
