= Irene Dean-Williams =

Australian aviator (1903 - 1946)

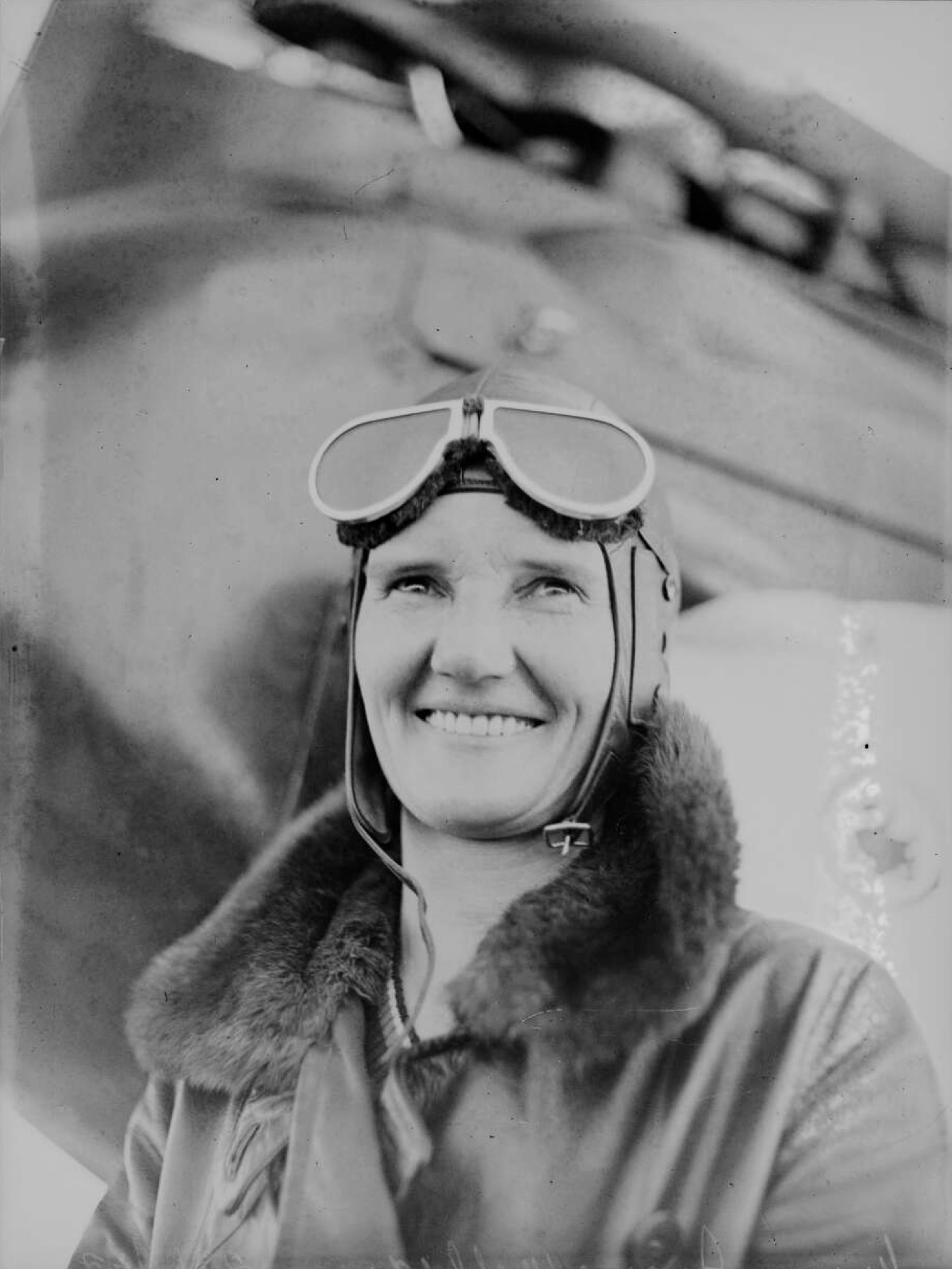
- Irene Dean-Williams in Adelaide, April 1932 during her Perth–Sydney record-breaking flight
- Born: Irene Dean-Williams
- Aviation career
- First flight: 1931
- Famous flights: first woman to fly between Perth and Sydney return in 1932

Irene Selina Dean-Williams (12 July 1903 – 3 July 1946) was a pioneer aviator. She was the first woman to obtain a commercial pilot license and became the first woman pilot to own an aircraft in Western Australia. She is best known for making a record-breaking flight from Perth to Sydney.

== Early life and education ==
Dean-Williams was born Selina Irene Schmidt at Warracknabeal, Victoria on 12 July 1903. Her father died a year later and, following her mother's remarriage to Harry Dean-Williams in 1910, she and her sisters adopted their stepfather’s surname. After the family moved to Perth, Western Australia, she was educated at Perth College in Mount Lawley.

== Career ==
Dean-Williams obtained her private pilot’s licence on 30 May 1931. She then obtained a commercial pilot’s licence in late 1932. Her mother bought her a bi-plane and the renowned Harry “Cannon-Ball” Baker gave her flight instruction.

In 1932 she made a record-breaking flight. She was the first woman to fly between Perth and Sydney return. Sponsored by Berlei Clothing Company, Dean-Williams left Perth on 27 March 1932 arriving in Sydney on 20 April 1932. Her return flight left Sydney eight days later. Flying at 80 miles per hour she returned to Perth on 27 April 1932.

== Personal ==
Dean-Williams married Lance Corporal William John McGushion on 16 May 1942.

She died of cancer on 3 July 1946 and was buried in Northam Cemetery.

== Legacy ==
A building is named after Dean-Williams at Perth Airport.

A collection of her papers was donated to the J.S.Battye Library of West Australian History in 2008.
