= Association of Coeducational Schools =

Australian interschool sports organization

Association of Co-educational Schools
- Abbreviation: ACS
- Formation: 1997
- Headquarters: Melbourne, Victoria, Australia
- Members: 8
- Website: acssport.org.au

The Association of Coeducational Schools (ACS) was formed in 1997 and commenced midweek sporting competitions for Years 7–12 in 1998 with five founding member schools that are coeducational and shared similar philosophies and a commitment to sport.

== Weekly Sport ==
Sport for all year levels is played during the week. ACS offers 14 weekly sports, played midweek, across summer and winter seasons, including mixed sports.

Sports offered include: mixed badminton, basketball, cricket, Australian Rules football, football (soccer), futsal, hockey, mixed lawn bowls, netball, softball, table tennis, tennis, mixed touch football and volleyball.

== Championship Carnivals ==
The ACS offers three major championships; athletics, swimming and cross country. The annual chess tournament and public speaking events are also part of the ACS calendar.

== Member Schools ==
School	Location	Principal	Enrolment	Founded	Denomination	Year Entered Competition	School Colours
Aitken College	Greenvale	Josie Crisara	~1200	1999	Uniting Church	2025	Navy, dark green, sky blue and yellow
Bacchus Marsh Grammar School	Maddingley, Bacchus Marsh	Debra Ogston	~2,500	1988	Ecumenical	2024	Black, gold, royal blue and white
Loyola College	Watsonia	Alison Leutchford (acting principal)	1,333	1980	Roman Catholic	1997	Royal blue, white and maroon
Overnewton Anglican Community College	Keilor, Taylors Lakes	Emily FitzSimmons	2,109	1987	Anglican	2003	Red, blue and white
St Aloysius' College	North Melbourne	Mary Farah	550	1887	Roman Catholic	2022	Navy, white and old gold
St Leonard's College	Brighton East	Peter Clague	1,426	1914	Uniting Church	1997	Navy and green
St Michael's Grammar School	St Kilda	Gerard Houlihan	1,204	1895	Anglican	1997	Navy, red and white
Westbourne Grammar School	Truganina	Adrian Camm	1,479	1867	Non-Denominational	1997	Navy, green and gold

== Former members ==
School	Location	Enrolment	Founded	Denomination	Years Competed	School Colours
Beaconhills College	Berwick, Pakenham	3,000	1982	Anglican, Uniting Church	2013–2023	Navy and gold
Eltham College	Research	1,200	1973	Non-Denominational	1997–2009	Sage, cream and cranberry
Thomas Carr College	Tarneit	1,125	1997	Roman Catholic	2003–2019	Navy, royal blue and white

== See also ==
- List of schools in Victoria
