= Danté Exum =

Australian basketball player (born 1995)

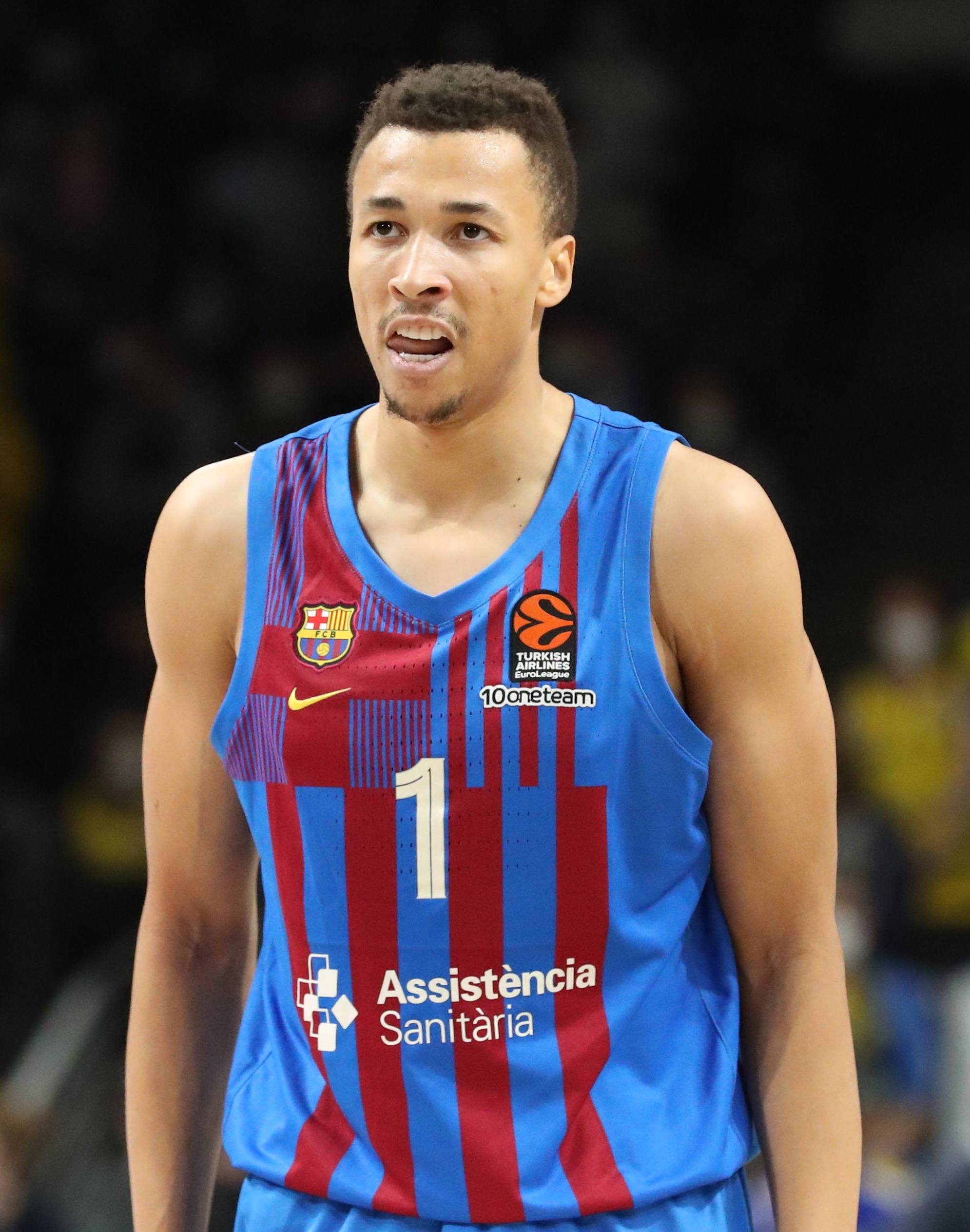
- Exum with FC Barcelona in 2022

Free agent
- Position: Shooting guard / point guard

Personal information
- Born: 13 July 1995 (age 31) Melbourne, Victoria, Australia
- Listed height: 6 ft 5 in (1.96 m)
- Listed weight: 214 lb (97 kg)

Career information
- High school: Thomas Carr College (Melbourne, Victoria); Lake Ginninderra (Canberra, ACT)
- NBA draft: 2014: 1st round, 5th overall pick
- Drafted by: Utah Jazz
- Playing career: 2014–present

Career history
- 2014–2019: Utah Jazz
- 2019–2021: Cleveland Cavaliers
- 2021–2022: FC Barcelona
- 2022–2023: Partizan
- 2023–2026: Dallas Mavericks

Career highlights
- ABA League champion (2023); All-ABA League Team (2023); Spanish Cup winner (2022); EuroLeague Magic Moment (2023)
- Stats at NBA.com
- Stats at Basketball Reference
Medals
Men's basketball
Representing Australia
Olympic Games
Bronze medal – third place	2020 Tokyo	Team
FIBA Oceania Championship
Gold medal – first place	2013 Australia/New Zealand
FIBA Oceania Youth Tournament
Gold medal – first place	2010 New Caledonia	Team

Danté Exum (/ˈdɑːnteɪ ˈɛksəm/ DAHN-tay EK-səm; born 13 July 1995) is an Australian professional basketball player who last played for the Dallas Mavericks of the National Basketball Association (NBA). He chose to bypass college and was ultimately selected by the Utah Jazz with the fifth overall pick in the 2014 NBA draft.

Exum has played for the Australia national team and won a bronze medal at the 2020 Tokyo Olympics.

== Early career ==
Exum was born in the Melbourne suburb of East Melbourne to American parents. He played basketball for the Keilor Thunder as a junior and also played Australian rules football at school. He attended Thomas Carr College in Melbourne. He later moved to Canberra to attend the Australian Institute of Sport and Lake Ginninderra Secondary College. He competed for Lake Ginninderra in the Australian National High School Basketball Championships in 2013, helping them win the title.

In April 2013, Exum participated in the Nike Hoop Summit for the World Select Team, where he recorded 16 points, three rebounds and two assists in a 112–98 win over the USA Junior Select Team.

In October 2013, Exum graduated from high school in Australia and had the option to enroll in college and play college basketball during the 2013–14 season, but he decided against it. On 28 January 2014, it was announced that Exum signed with agents from Landmark Sports and that he would declare for the 2014 NBA draft.

== Professional career ==
=== Utah Jazz (2014–2019) ===
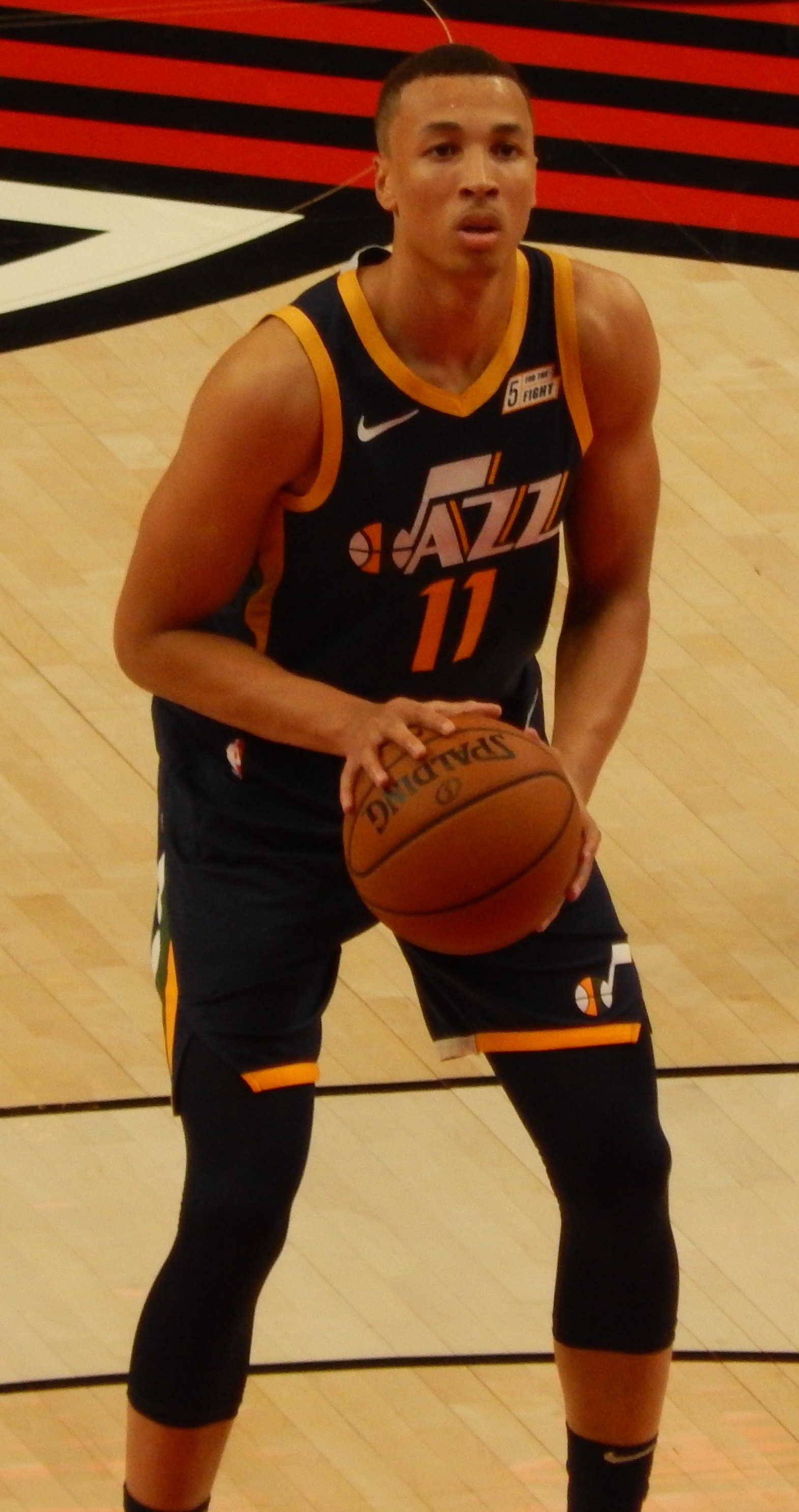
Exum with the Utah Jazz in 2018

Exum was selected by the Utah Jazz with the fifth overall pick in the 2014 NBA draft. He made his NBA debut in the Jazz's season opener on 29 October, scoring five points in 9½ minutes off the bench in a 104–93 loss to the Houston Rockets. On 22 January, he scored a career-high 15 points on five 3-pointers in a 101–99 win over the Milwaukee Bucks. On 1 April, he had a career-high 12 assists in a 98–84 win over the Denver Nuggets. He appeared in all 82 games (41 starts) as a rookie and averaged 4.8 points, 1.6 rebounds and 2.4 assists in 22.2 minutes. Exum became only the 10th rookie in Jazz history to play in all 82 games, scoring in double figures in 13 games and leading the team in assists 11 times. He helped the Jazz to a 24–17 record as a starter and was selected to compete in the 2015 Rising Stars Challenge during the NBA's All-Star Weekend in New York.

In August 2015, Exum sustained a tear of the anterior cruciate ligament (ACL) in his left knee while playing for Australia in Slovenia. He underwent surgery and subsequently missed the entire 2015–16 season.

Exum returned to action in the 2016–17 season. He played in 28 of the first 29 games of the season, but then sat out 10 of 11 games between 21 December and 10 January. On 11 March, he scored a career-high 22 points in a 112–104 loss to the Oklahoma City Thunder.

In October 2017, Exum underwent shoulder surgery. He made his first appearance of the season on 15 March 2018, finishing with 10 points in a 116–88 win over the Phoenix Suns. On 30 March 2018, he scored a season-high 21 points in a 107–97 win over the Memphis Grizzlies.

On 6 July 2018, Exum re-signed with the Jazz. On 27 December 2018, he scored a season-high 20 points in a 114–97 loss to the Philadelphia 76ers. Two days later, in his first start of the season, Exum had 13 points and a career-high 13 assists in a 129–97 victory over the New York Knicks. On 7 January 2019, he was ruled out for "a couple of weeks" due to an ankle sprain that he suffered two days earlier against the Detroit Pistons. His return was delayed after developing a bone bruise from his ankle sprain. He returned to action on 11 March against the Thunder after missing 25 games. Four days later however, he was ruled out indefinitely after sustaining a partially torn patellar tendon in his right knee.

=== Cleveland Cavaliers (2019–2021) ===
On 24 December 2019, Exum was traded, alongside two second-round picks, to the Cleveland Cavaliers in exchange for Jordan Clarkson.

On 16 January 2021, Exum was traded to the Houston Rockets in a multi-player, four-team deal with the Cleveland Cavaliers that sent James Harden to the Brooklyn Nets; the Cavaliers received Taurean Prince and Jarrett Allen in the deal. He did not appear in any regular season games for Houston, although he did play sparse minutes in the preseason for the Rockets.

On 17 September 2021, Exum re-signed with the Rockets. However, he was waived on 16 October.

=== FC Barcelona (2021–2022) ===
On 7 December 2021, Exum signed with FC Barcelona of the Liga ACB and the EuroLeague.

=== Partizan Belgrade (2022–2023) ===
On 10 July 2022, Exum signed with Partizan Mozzart Bet of the Basketball League of Serbia (KLS), ABA League and the EuroLeague. During the 2022–23 season, Partizan was eliminated by Real Madrid in the playoffs. Over the season, Exum averaged 13.2 points, 2.7 assists and 2.3 rebounds per game. Partizan ended the 2022–23 season by lifting the ABA League championship trophy, after 3–2 score against Crvena zvezda in the Finals series.

=== Dallas Mavericks (2023–2026) ===
On 14 July 2023, Exum signed with the Dallas Mavericks. He made his debut for the Mavericks on 25 October in a 126–119 win over the San Antonio Spurs. On 12 December, Exum scored a season-high 26 points with a career-high seven made three-pointers in a 127–125 win over the Los Angeles Lakers. In 55 games (17 starts) for the team, he averaged 7.8 points, 2.7 rebounds, and 2.9 assists. Exum helped the Mavericks reach the NBA Finals where they lost to the Boston Celtics in five games.

Exum made 18 appearances (12 starts) during the 2024–25 NBA season, averaging 9.1 points, 1.7 assists, and 2.8 assists. On 14 March 2025, he was ruled out for the remainder of the season after suffering a broken bone in his left hand during a game against the Houston Rockets.

On 2 September 2025, he re-signed with the Mavericks on a one-year contract. On 20 November, before playing in any games during the season, Exum was ruled out for the remainder of the season to undergo surgery on his right knee. On 5 February 2026, Exum was traded to the Washington Wizards in a three-team trade involving the Charlotte Hornets. Three days later, Exum was waived by Washington.

== Career statistics ==
Legend
GP	Games played	GS	Games started	MPG	Minutes per game
FG%	Field-goal percentage	3P%	3-point field-goal percentage	FT%	Free-throw percentage
RPG	Rebounds per game	APG	Assists per game	SPG	Steals per game
BPG	Blocks per game	PPG	Points per game	PIR	Performance index rating
**Bold**	Career high

=== NBA ===
==== Regular season ====
Year	Team	GP	GS	MPG	FG%	3P%	FT%	RPG	APG	SPG	BPG	PPG
2014–15	Utah	**82**	**41**	**22.2**	.349	.314	.625	1.6	2.4	.5	.2	4.8
2016–17	Utah	66	26	18.6	.427	.295	.795	2.0	1.7	.3	.2	6.2
2017–18	Utah	14	0	16.8	.483	.278	.806	1.9	**3.1**	.6	.2	8.1
2018–19	Utah	42	1	15.8	.419	.290	.791	1.6	2.6	.3	.1	6.9
2019–20	Utah	11	0	7.6	.435	.333	**1.000**	1.1	.6	.1	.2	2.2
2019–20	Cleveland	24	1	16.8	.479	.351	.732	2.3	1.4	.5	**.3**	5.6
2020–21	Cleveland	6	3	19.4	.385	.182	.500	**2.8**	2.2	**.7**	**.3**	3.8
2023–24	Dallas	55	17	19.8	**.533**	**.491**	.779	2.7	2.9	.4	.1	7.8
2024–25	Dallas	20	13	18.6	.478	.434	.742	1.7	2.8	.6	.2	**8.7**
Career		320	102	18.8	.435	.343	.765	1.9	2.3	.4	.2	6.2

==== Playoffs ====
Year	Team	GP	GS	MPG	FG%	3P%	FT%	RPG	APG	SPG	BPG	PPG
2017	Utah	7	0	**12.0**	.407	.333	**1.000**	.9	**1.3**	**.7**	.0	4.6
2018	Utah	10	0	11.4	**.488**	.286	.750	**1.4**	1.0	.1	**.1**	**5.1**
2024	Dallas	**21**	0	6.8	.364	**.350**	.667	.8	.6	.1	.0	2.0
Career		38	0	9.0	.420	.333	.792	1.0	.8	.2	.1	3.3

=== EuroLeague ===
Year	Team	GP	GS	MPG	FG%	3P%	FT%	RPG	APG	SPG	BPG	PPG	PIR
2021–22	Barcelona	25	**10**	17.0	.515	**.545**	.849	**2.5**	1.6	.5	**.3**	6.3	8.1
2022–23	Partizan	**38**	7	**23.0**	**.520**	.393	**.858**	2.3	**2.7**	**.8**	.2	**13.2**	**14.3**
Career		63	17	20.6	.519	.419	.856	2.4	2.3	.7	.2	10.4	11.8

== National team career ==
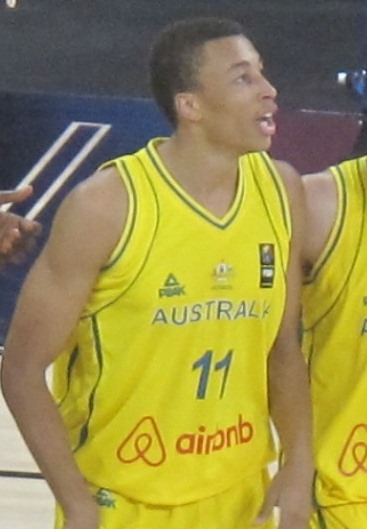
Exum with the Australian basketball team in 2014

Exum played for Australia's junior national team at the 2012 FIBA Under-17 World Cup, where he was named to the All-Tournament Team, as well as the 2013 FIBA Under-19 World Cup, where he was again named to the All-Tournament Team. 2013 also marked Exum's debut for the senior national team, playing against New Zealand at the 2013 FIBA Oceania Championship. In 2014, he played for Australia at the 2014 FIBA World Cup, where he averaged 2.7 points, 1.5 rebounds and 2.0 assists in six games.

Exum was selected for the Australian basketball team at the 2020 Tokyo Olympics. In the bronze playoff, he scored or assisted on 13 of Australia's points in the pivotal 20–8 run that turned a five-point lead into a 17-point advantage (105–88) with just over a minute remaining.

== Personal life ==
Exum has an older brother, Jamaar, and a twin sister, Tierra. His father, Cecil, played college basketball at the University of North Carolina and won an NCAA championship in 1982, a team which featured Michael Jordan and James Worthy. His mother also attended North Carolina. Cecil was drafted in 1984 by the Denver Nuggets, and later settled in Australia where he played in the National Basketball League for the North Melbourne Giants, Melbourne Tigers and Geelong Supercats. Exum is a passionate supporter of the Essendon Football Club, who compete in the Australian Football League. Exum wore Essendon-inspired shoes during the Rising Stars Challenge at the 2017 NBA All-Star Weekend.
