= Overnewton Anglican Community College =

Anglican school in Melbourne, Victoria, Australia

Location
- Keilor, Victoria; Australia; 37°42′25″S 144°49′23″E

Information
- Type: Independent day school
- Motto: The Lord is My Light
- Denomination: Anglican
- Established: 1987; 39 years ago
- Principal: Emily FitzSimons
- Staff: ~350
- Years offered: Prep – 12
- Gender: Co-educational
- Enrolment: >2,400
- Campus: Suburban
- Colours: Navy blue, ruby red, sky blue and white
- Slogan: Over & Above
- School fees: $11,350 – $23,750
- Affiliation: Association of Coeducational Schools
- Website: overnewton.vic.edu.au

The Overnewton Anglican Community College, commonly referred to as Overnewton, is an independent Anglican co-educational day school, in Melbourne, Victoria, Australia, founded in 1987.

The College has two campuses, the Yirramboi Campus (formerly Keilor Campus) located in Keilor and the Canowindra Campus (formerly Taylors Lakes Campus) located in Taylors Lakes. Prep to Year 4 (Junior School) and Year 9 operate at the Canowindra Campus, while Years 5 to 8 (Middle School) and Years 10 to 12 (Senior School) operate at the Yirramboi Campus.

== Principals ==
The following individuals have served as principals of the College:

Order	Name	Term started	Term ended	Time in office	Notes
1	Keith Richardson	1987	1995	7–8 years	
2	Lesley Bell	1995	2000	4–5 years	
3	John Brenan	2000	2001	0–1 years	
4	James Laussen	2001	2023	21–22 years	
5	Emily FitzSimons	2023	incumbent	2–3 years	

== Curriculum approach ==
The College provides a carefully sequenced curriculum from Prep to Year 12, guided by a collaborative approach among teaching teams, learning leaders, and the College Academic Executive. Programs are informed by best practice and evidence-based strategies, with a strong focus on personalised learning. Students receive targeted support to consolidate new concepts or extend their learning, assisted by Learning Development and Support staff and the Talent and Potential Team, which offers enrichment opportunities. This approach aims to ensure students have clear pathways to progress and achieve at each stage of their education.

John Lee serves as Director of Teaching and Learning, overseeing the implementation of this curriculum and the coordination of teaching teams across all year levels and subject areas.

== House Program ==
The House Program at Overnewton is a core component of the co-curricular program, providing students with opportunities for teamwork, leadership, and cross-age activities. Events and clubs are coordinated to align with the College’s four co-curricular pillars, emphasising participation and inclusivity. Students can compete for house shields in a variety of activities, and top performers may represent the College in external competitions. The four houses; Curie, Edison, Newton, and Pasteur, are represented by distinct colours worn on sports uniforms.

The House Program is part of Overnewton’s broader co-curricular framework, which offers students a range of experiences designed to support personal development, engagement, and growth beyond the classroom.Upon enrolment, each student is allocated to a house for the duration of their time at the College. House placement is determined either randomly or by aligning the student with the house of an enrolled sibling.

=== College Houses ===
House	Colour	Named after	Mascot
Curie		Marie Curie; A Polish-French physicist and chemist	Cougars
Edison		Thomas Edison; An American inventor and businessman	Eagles
Pasteur		Louis Pasteur; A French chemist, pharmacist, and microbiologist	Pirates
Newton		Isaac Newton; An English mathematician, physicist, astronomer, alchemist, theologian, and author	Knights

== Co-curricular ==
Students are encouraged to become involved in a range of co-curricular activities that complement the academic program.

=== Activate Sport ===
In Prep to Year 4, students participate in sports to provide a way for children to be physically active and to improve their sporting abilities for later Years in a non-competitive environment.

In Years 5 and 6, students participate in a weekly interschool sporting program, competing in a range of team sports available at district, zone, region and national levels. Competition is under the guidelines of the Victorian Department of Education's School Sport Victoria (SSV). The sport teams are organised so that students can participate in boys, mixed or girls only competitions. The sports offered including basketball, hot shot tennis, football, kanga cricket, netball, soccer, softball, and volleyball. In Term 4, all Year 5 students compete in an additional sporting competition with other independent co-educational schools within the district.

The College is part of the Association of Coeducational Schools (ACS) sports competition which involves other independent co-educational schools around Melbourne since 2003. Year 6 students prepare to join ACS in Term 4 where participation is mandatory in Years 7-11, and optional for Year 12 students. Students participate in a range of team sports, through the Summer and Winter Seasons, as well as three major sport carnivals (Swimming, Cross Country and Athletics) within the ACS competition. In Years 10-12, the Best and Fairest players as nominated by their coaches are recognised via ACS All Star awards. ACS All Star recipients have the opportunity to play in association matches against the Ballarat Associated Schools (BAS).

=== Activate Performance Programs ===
Overnewton offers Performance Programs across a range of sports, with two sports - Soccer and Cheer Sport - achieving national recognition.

==== Cheer ====
Overnewton offers a Cheer Sport program in which students from Years 5 to 12 can participate, with opportunities to compete in external competitions and showcases. The College’s representative teams have won the primary and secondary national scholastic titles for two consecutive years. Training is provided by coaches from Southern Cross Cheer with the program emphasising skill development, participation, and teamwork.

==== Soccer ====
Overnewton is the first football partner school of Melbourne Victory Football Club. Through this affiliation, students have access to professional coaching, specialised training environments, and selected A-League engagement opportunities. The program is delivered by Melbourne Victory academy coaches and focuses on developing technical skills, tactical understanding, teamwork, and resilience. Students also participate in match-day activities and other club-based experiences as part of the program.

=== Be Heard ===
The Be Heard program focuses on developing students’ communication and public speaking abilities. Students begin building basic speaking skills in their early years and may later participate in debates and competitive public speaking. The program provides access to external opportunities, including the Debating Association of Victoria and the YMCA Victorian Youth Parliament, where students practise argument construction, evidence-based reasoning, and impromptu responses.

Debating is a commonly participated activity at the College, with students entering events such as the DAV Junior Public Speaking Competition, ACS Public Speaking, and the VCAA Plain English Speaking Award. These activities are intended to support the development of confidence, critical thinking, and effective communication.

=== Encore ===
The Performing Arts co-curricular program at Overnewton provides students from Prep to Year 12 with opportunities to participate in music, dance, and drama activities. Students may undertake tuition in a range of instruments and participate in ensembles such as symphonic, jazz, and rock bands, string orchestra, and various choirs. Many students also complete external performance examinations, including those offered by AMEB and ANZCA.

In the Junior School, students take part in performances at assemblies, College events, Eisteddfods, and the House Encore Performance. In later years, opportunities extend to larger productions, including the Year 5/6 Musical, the College Musical, and Battle of the Houses. These events provide experience in ensemble performance and public presentation.

Senior School students participate in activities such as improvisation workshops, drama evenings, and the Senior School House Performance Production. The program also includes participation in community events, contributing to the College’s broader performing arts culture.

=== Getaways ===
Overnewton offers a Getaways Program that provides students with a range of educational travel experiences. Destinations have included the Northern Territory for Indigenous cultural learning, New York and Los Angeles for performing arts activities, New Zealand for outdoor and adventure programs, China for cultural immersion, and the United Kingdom for soccer development tours. These experiences are designed to support independence, global awareness, and personal development.

=== Synergy ===
Synergy at Overnewton focuses on engagement within the community, service learning, sustainability, Indigenous culture, and global awareness. Activities include fundraising, awareness projects, and opportunities to engage with the College’s sister school in Galiwin’ku, Northern Territory.

The pillar includes groups such as the Student Representative Council, Sustainability Team, Reconciliation Action Plan Committee, People of Colour Alliance, Kindness Collective, and the Delta Project. These groups work on initiatives related to inclusion, reconciliation, environmental sustainability, and student leadership.

== Master plan ==
In 2018, principal James Laussen, unveiled a new master plan for the College. Implemented in 2021, the plan restructured the Junior and Middle Schools, resulting in one Junior School located at the Canowindra Campus and one Middle School at the Yirramboi Campus. Previously, both campuses housed their own Junior and Middle Schools. In addition to these organisational changes, the plan included the construction of a Prep–2 Learning Centre and a new Year 6–7 Learning Centre, the latter of which won the Learning Environments Australasia Award for New Facility Over $8M in 2022.
