= Emily Ayckbowm =

Mother Superior of the Community of Sisters of the church (1836–1900)

- Born: 14 November 1836; Heidelberg
- Died: 5 June 1900 (aged 63); Broadstairs
- Occupation: nun
- Known for: founder of the Community of the Sisters of the Church

Emily Ayckbowm (1836–1900) was the founder and first mother superior of the Community of the Sisters of the Church. This Anglican order was founded in 1870.

== Life ==
She was the daughter of Mary Ann(e) born Hutchinson and the Rev. Frederick Ayckbowm, rector of Holy Trinity Church, Chester. He was of German descent and she was born in Heidelberg whilst her parents were visiting. Her mother died in 1842 and her father soon remarried, Charlotte, and she gained a devoted stepmother. In 1861 her married sister died and in 1862 her father died.

In 1864 she founded the very successful Church Extension Association which had a wide remit to do good works. She came to notice when she and her friend were commended for their voluntary work during an outbreak of cholera in Chester in 1866. In 1870 she founded the Community of the Sisters of the Church. She became the first novice of the order and she was "clothed" by the Reverend R.C.Kirkpatrick in the new parish of St Augustine's, Kilburn.

Whilst she was the Mother Superior the community found that it had gathered a number of critics. One of the patrons, Archbishop Edward White Benson, tried to intercede but Ayckbowm distrusted his views and he had little trust in her. She rejected his help. This is thought to be poor judgement by Ayckbowm, she removed him, and any other male supporters, from their literature and it is judged that the community's reputation was reduced. However the "Community of the Sisters of the Church" continued.

== Death and legacy ==
Ayckbowm lived to see sisters of the order going to South Africa. She died of gangrene and diabetes on 5 June 1900 and she was buried at St Peter's Church in Thanet. Sisters including Sister Rosalie that she had trained later set out for Australia to found Perth College in 1901.
