= Mabel Nicholas =

Anglican Sister and college principal (1866–1958)

Sister Rosalie
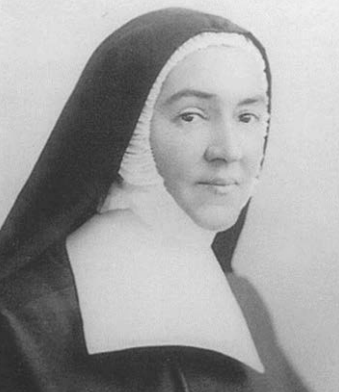
- Born: Mabel Nicholas; 13 July 1866; Kilburn
- Died: 16 July 1958 (aged 92); Mount Lawley
- Occupation: Anglican sister
- Known for: founding and leading Perth College

Mabel Nicholas OBE who became Sister Rosalie (13 July 1866 – 16 July 1958) was a UK-born Anglican Sister and a founder and principal of Perth College for girls.

== Life ==
Nicholas was born in the London area of Kilburn in 1866. Her parents were Mary Ellen (born Hodding) and a wine merchant named John Nicholas. She made her first donation to Emily Ayckbowm's Community of the Sisters of the Church when she was four years old. She gave money to feed breakfasts for poor schoolchildren. Her parents were well off and she became a novice in 1892, In 1895 she took the name of Sister Rosalie encouraged by Emily Ayckbowm to use her talent for business organisation.

She and two other sisters, Vera and Susanna, arrived at Fremantle on the ship named Australia on 20 November 1901. They quickly founded a school for girls named the Girls' High School in Kalgoorlie but it was also known as Lamington Heights Orphanage. Nine of the initial students had been transported by the sisters from the Orphanage of Mercy in Kilburn. These students were aged between six and ten years old.

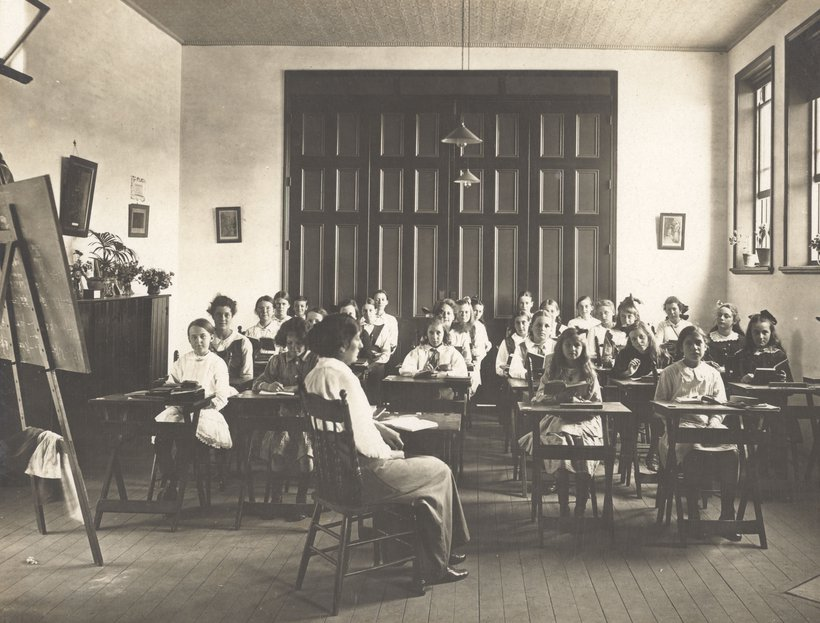
Perth College - a 1920 class

Her contribution to the founding of Perth College was significant. The sisters chose Mount Lawley in Perth as a location for their school but it was Nicholas and the diocese's secretary who raised the money in Perth to build it. She then went to England where she gained the support of Arthur Winnington-Ingram, the Bishop of London, and the editors of two newspapers. They assisted her in publicising the nun's appeal for financial support, By 1916 she was able to supervise the opening of the new school and the school in Kalgoorlie closed.

In 1949 she was awarded an OBE. She is reported to have said "What for?"

== Death and legacy ==
Nicholas died in 1958 in Mount Lawley. Perth College named Rosalie House after her. The school estimates that it has educated over 13,000 girls and it was doing it with another 1,000 enrolled at the school when it celebrated its centenary.
