= Aitken College (Greenvale, Victoria) =

Location
- 1010 Mickleham Road; Greenvale, Victoria 3059; Australia; 37.627607°S 144.890335°E

Information
- Type: private school, co-educational, primary, secondary and day
- Motto: In Mind and Spirit
- Denomination: in association with the Uniting Church
- Established: 1999
- Founder: Doug Mahoney
- Chairman: Robert Evans
- Principal: Josie Crisara
- Deputy Principal: Kim Forward
- Enrolment: ~1200 (Prep–12)
- Campus: Suburban, 18 hectares (44 acres)
- Colours: Yellow, green, blue & red
- Newspaper: College newsletter
- Yearbook: The Windmill
- Website: www.aitkencollege.edu.au

Aitken College is a private, co-education day school located in Greenvale, Victoria, Australia. It offers schooling education from Prep through to Year 12.

The College caters for students of all faiths and religious denominations in the northwest region of Melbourne. It opened in January 1999. It operates in association with the Uniting Church in Australia but is not governed or managed by the Church.

== Students ==
As of the 2022 school year, there were 1600 students. The college is divided into four smaller "schools":

- Fairview (preparatory school) – Prep to Year 2
- Cumberland (junior school) – Year 3 to Year 6
- Dunhelen (middle school) – Year 7 to Year 9
- Brookhill (senior school) – Year 10 to Year 12

== Leadership ==
The following individuals have served as principal of Aitken College:

Ordinal	Principal	Term start	Term end	Time in office	Notes
1	Doug Mahoney	1999	2008	8–9 years	Founding Principal
2	Josie Crisara	2009	incumbent	16–17 years	

The following individuals have served as deputy principal of Aitken College:

Ordinal	Deputy Principal	Term start	Term end	Time in office	Notes
1	Josie Crisara	2002	2008	5–6 years	
2	Kim Forward	2009	incumbent	16–17 years	

The following individuals have served as Assistant Principal for Primary (Prep - Year 6) of Aitken College:

Ordinal	Assistant Principal for Primary	Term start	Term end	Time in office	Notes
1	Leanne Schulz	2022	incumbent	3–4 years	

The following individuals have served as Assistant Principal for Secondary (Year 7 - Year 12) of Aitken College:

Ordinal	Assistant Principal for Secondary	Term start	Term end	Time in office	Notes
1	Chris Graham	2022	incumbent	3–4 years	

The following individuals have served as Assistant Principal for Learning of Aitken College:

Ordinal	Assistant Principal for Learning	Term start	Term end	Time in office	Notes
1	Kerri Batch	2022	incumbent	3–4 years	

The following individuals have served as Chairman of the Aitken College Board:

Ordinal	Chairman of the Board	Term start	Term end	Time in office	Notes
1	Rev. Clem Dickinson	1999	2018	18–19 years	
2	Robert Evans	2019	incumbent	6–7 years	
