= Perth College (Western Australia) =

Anglican girls' school in Mount Lawley, Western Australia

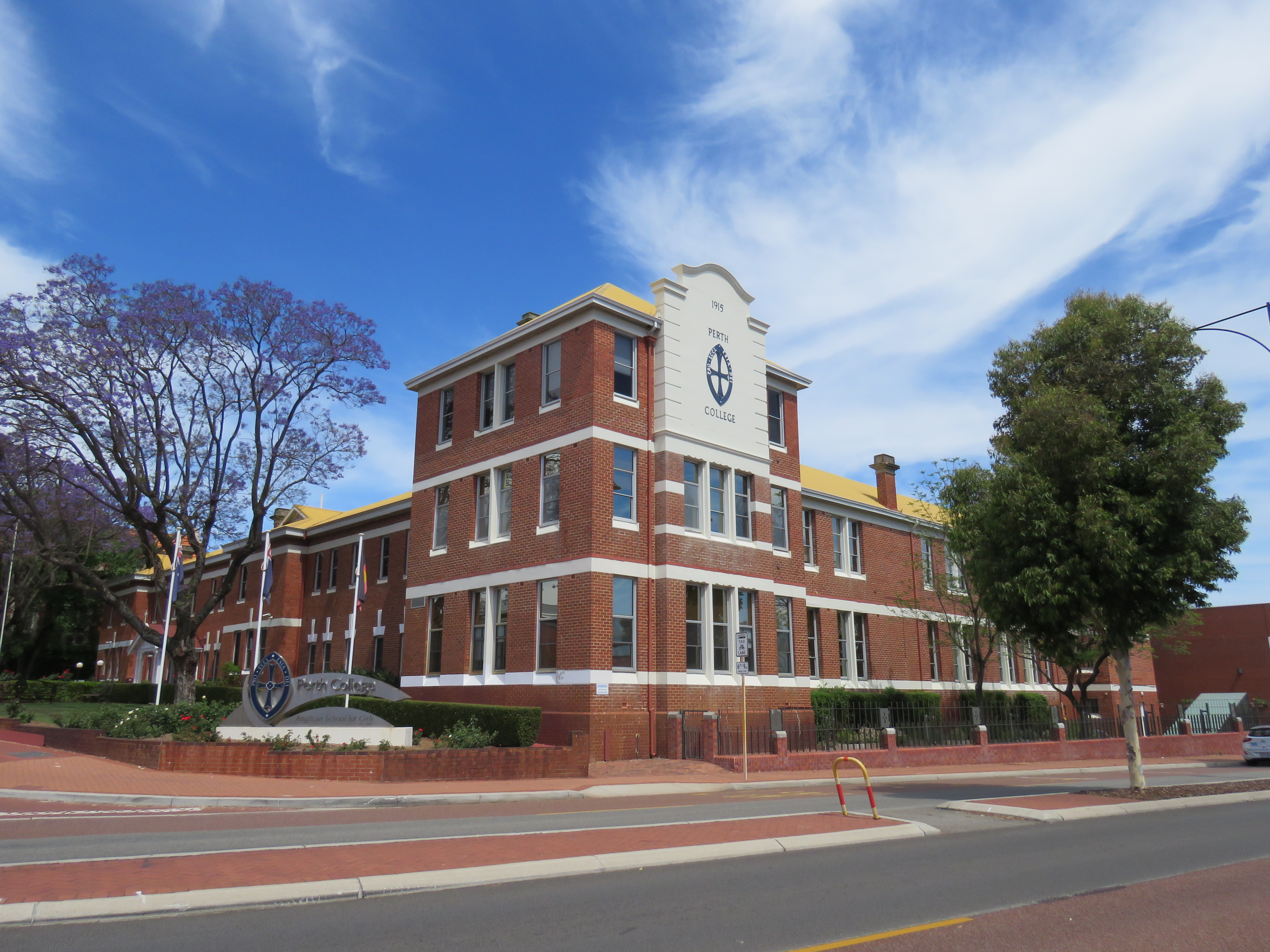
- Perth College seen from Beaufort Street

Location
- Mount Lawley, Western Australia; Australia; 31°55′54″S 115°52′34″E

Information
- Type: Independent, single-sex, day and boarding
- Motto: Latin: Pro Ecclesia Dei (For the Church of God)
- Denomination: Anglican
- Established: 1902
- Principal: Sarah McGarry
- Employees: ~96
- Enrolment: ~1,100 (K–12)
- Colours: Navy blue, white and jacaranda
- Affiliation: Independent Girls Schools Sports Association
- Website: www.perthcollege.wa.edu.au

Perth College is an Australian independent Anglican day and boarding school for girls located in Mount Lawley, an inner northern suburb of Perth, Western Australia. The school maintains a non-selective enrolment policy and currently has approximately 1,000 students from Kindergarten to Year 12, including 110 boarders from Year 7 onwards.

Perth College is affiliated with the Association of Heads of Independent Schools of Australia (AHISA), the Junior School Heads Association of Australia (JSHAA), the Association of Independent Schools of Western Australia, the Australian Boarding Schools Association (ABSA) and the Alliance of Girls' Schools Australia (AGSA). The school is also a member of the Independent Girls' Schools Sports Association (IGSSA).

== History ==
The school was founded in 1902 by Sister Rosalie and other members of the Community of the Sisters of the Church, an Anglican religious order. Perth College is the oldest Anglican girls' school in Western Australia. The school first commenced in St Mary's Hall in Colin Street, West Perth, with 32 girls. The demand for the introduction of boarding students increased and, as a result, Hawkesbury, situated near Kings Park, was opened in 1903.

Due to the development of Hawkesbury for boarders and Cowandilla for the junior students, together with the amalgamation of other subsidiary schools under the control of the Sisters of the Church, the school moved to the Mount Lawley site in 1916.

Perth College premises were used during World War II as a base of operations for the Army. The flagpole which stands at the front of the school was a gift.

Perth College came under the control of the Anglican Province of Western Australia in 1968.

The school has performed consistently well in the WACE school rankings and is often amongst the best performing schools in the state.

Year	% +75 in WACE (Note: Based on the number of Stage 3 course enrolments in the school where a WACE course score of 75 or above was achieved)	State ranking (Note: Ranking of school compared to other schools in the state)	% +65 in WACE (Note: Based on the number of Stage 3 course enrolments in the school where a WACE course score of 65 or above was achieved)	State ranking	% graduation (Note: Percentage of Year 12 cohort that graduated with a WACE certificate)
2016	-	-	-	7	100
2014	26.01	10	55.31	10	100
2013	19.15	11	52.63	8	100
2012	23.67	11	55.64	12	99.28
2011	19.75	19	59.08	13	99.30
2010	28.91	8	68.07	6	100
2009		5		5	100

== Notable alumnae ==
The alumnae of Perth College are commonly referred to as Old Girls and they may join the school's alumnae association, the Perth College Old Girls' Association. Some notable Perth College Old Girls include:

- Carrie Bickmore – radio and television presenter seen on The Project
- Sally Carlton – community and social worker; superintendent in Western Australia of the Australian Women's Land Army during the Second World War
- Irene Dean-Williams – aviator and Perth–Sydney women's flight record holder
- The Hon. Donna Faragher (MLC) – politician; Minister and Parliamentary Secretary in the Barnett Ministry
- Jean Elsie Ferguson – hospital matron
- Dorothy Hewett – writer
- Kate Hooper – water polo player who won a gold medal at the 2000 Summer Olympics in Sydney
- Decima Norman – track-and-field athlete who won five gold medals at the 1938 British Empire Games in Sydney
- Brianna Throssell – Australian swimmer

== See also ==
- List of schools in the Perth metropolitan area
- List of boarding schools
