= Community of the Sisters of the Church =

Anglican religious order of women

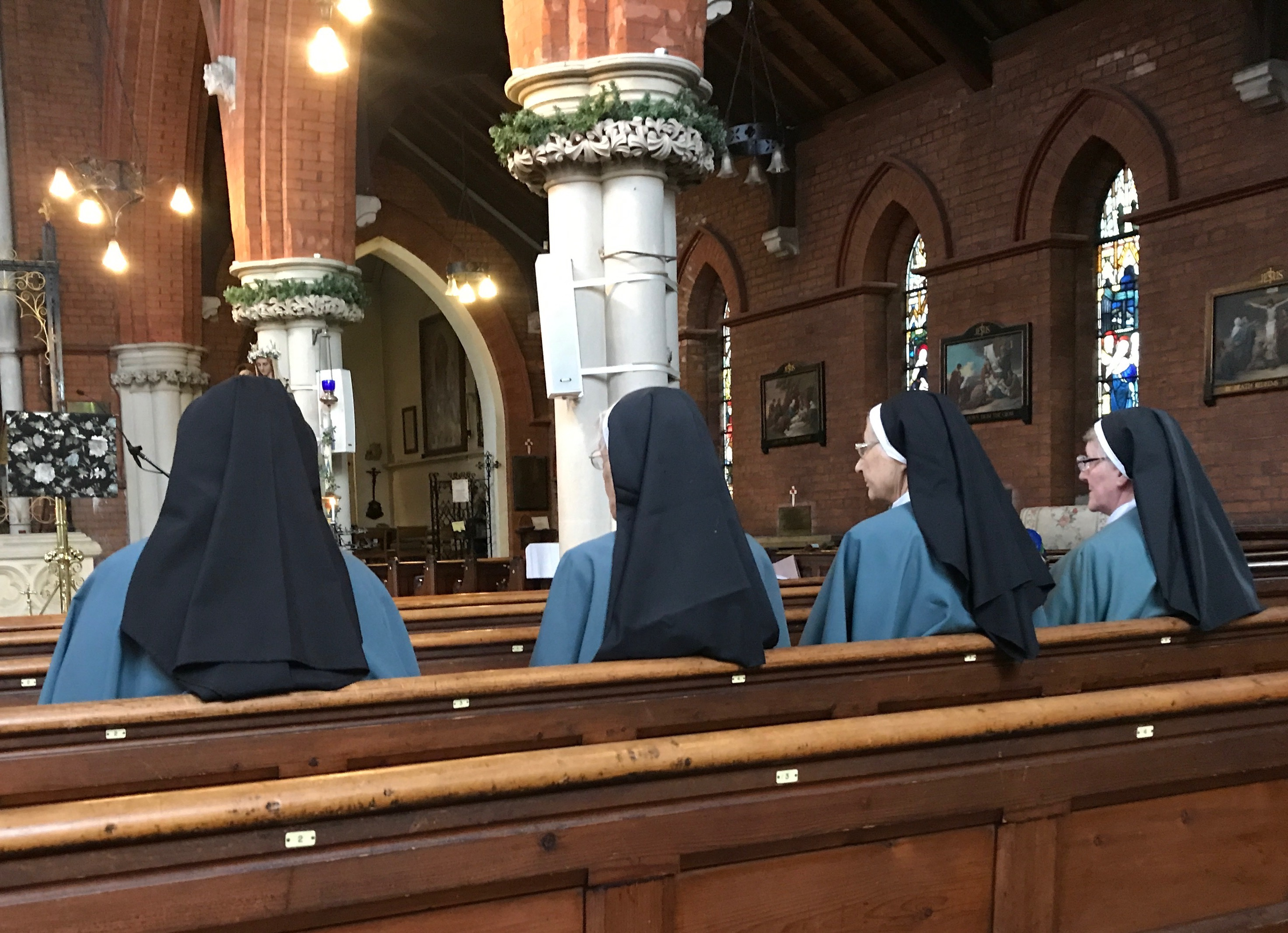
Four members of the United Kingdom Province.

The Community of the Sisters of the Church is a religious order of women in various Anglican provinces who live the vowed life of poverty, chastity and obedience. In 2012 the order had 105 sisters living in community, together with an extensive network of associates.

== History ==
The order was founded by Mother Emily Ayckbowm who in 1864 had founded the Church Extension Association. The Church Extension Association evolved into the present Community of the Sisters of the Church. Ayckbowm was the first novice of the order in 1870. Mother Emily and other women who felt called to the religious life established schools and orphanages throughout England in the late 19th century. The sisters have houses worldwide (see below). The order is under the patronage of St Michael and All Angels.

Sister Dorina CSC was a prominent religious artist of the 1920s and 1930s who is particularly remembered for a set of Stations of the Cross which has been replicated many times over; examples of this work may be found in many Anglican churches, especially in London.

Sister Eudora CSC (Bessie te Wenerau Grace) was the first Māori woman to gain a university degree.

== Current life and work ==
Any woman who feels called to join the sisters must first apply to the order and then make several visits. Then she becomes an aspirant, then a novice, then makes promises to live as a junior sister for a few years before taking life vows.

The Sisters of the Church are supported by an international network of associates, who pray for the sisters and give financial and other support for their ministries, which include parish and retreat work, counselling and the only centre in the Solomon Islands for abused women and children at Tenaru.

Their most visible presence in recent years was when two sisters, one in Reeboks, sat in the sanctuary of Westminster Abbey during the wedding of the Prince and Princess of Wales on 29 April 2012.

== Structure ==
The order is led by an elected Reverend Mother Superior, who has international responsibility for all houses and all sisters. The order is then divided into provinces, each of which has an elected provincial superior and assistant superior. While individual provinces and even individual houses may set local regulations, there is a common rule of life throughout the order.

=== Australia ===
The community was founded in 1892. In 1901 three sisters arrived from England and Sister Rosalie became one of the founders of Perth College.

The community was constituted in 1965, the province has convents in New South Wales at Glebe, Kempsey and Camperdown (Sydney).

In addition two sisters live in Melbourne, Victoria:

  - One sister is in retirement housing at Toorak
  - One sister works in Melton parish

=== Canada ===
Founded in 1890 and constituted in 1965, the province had a single convent before transitioning to a dispersed community:

- Oakville, Ontario (St Michael's House)

=== Solomon Islands ===
Founded in 1970 and constituted in 2001, the province has convents at:

- Tetete ni Kolivuti (the training centre for postulants and novices)
- Honiara (Patteson House)
- Ysabel (St Scholastica's House)
- Temotu, Santa Cruz (St Mary's House)
- Kira Kira, Ulawa (St Gabriel's House)
- Auki, Malaita (St Raphael's House)
- Christian Care Centre (home for women victims of domestic abuse)

=== United Kingdom ===
Founded in 1870, in Kilburn, NW London, the 'original' province has convents at these locations:

- Gerrards Cross, Buckinghamshire (St Michael's Convent)
- Bristol (parish work, and street ministry amongst sex workers)
- Clevedon, Somerset (St Gabriel's Convent) (retreat house, and training centre for postulants and novices)
- West Harrow, Middlesex
- St Anne's-on-Sea, Lancashire
- Kingsdown, Kent

The UK mother house, St Michael's Convent, was relocated from Ham Common (Richmond, Surrey) to Gerrards Cross between 2016 and 2018, with the new St Michael's Convent and retreat centre officially opening on the weekend of 2 and 3 June 2018.

=== Extra-provincial ===
There are currently no convents of the order outside the four provinces shown above. In the past, convents have been located outside these provinces, in India, Burma, South Africa, and extensively in New Zealand.

== See also ==
- St James' Church, Sydney
