= David Meates =

New Zealand businessman and health administrator

David Meates MNZM
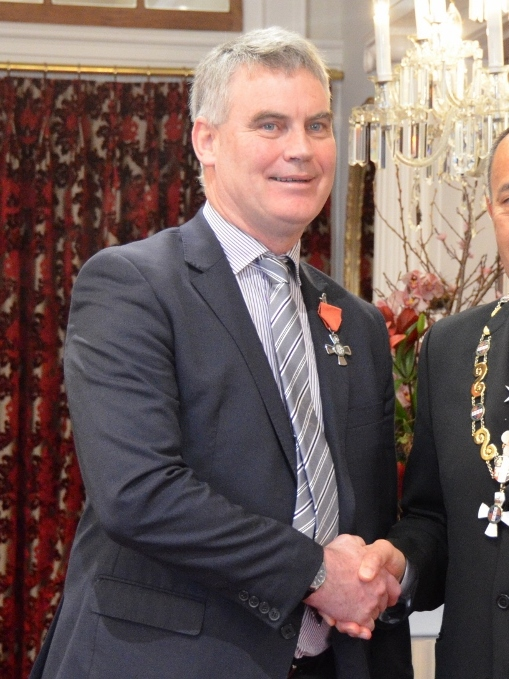
- Meates in 2014
- Born: David William Meates; 1961 or 1962 (age 64–65); Christchurch, New Zealand
- Education: University of Canterbury
- Occupation: Business executive
- Years active: since 1988
- Spouse: Julie Meates
- Children: 3
- Relatives: Bill Meates (father); Kevin Meates (uncle)

David William Meates (born 1961 or 1962) MNZM is a New Zealand business leader in Christchurch, New Zealand, and son of former All Black, Bill Meates. He was chief executive of Canterbury and West Coast District Health Boards until 4 September 2020.

He resigned because of alleged pressure from the Ministry of Health, Crown monitor of the Health Board and Canterbury District Health Board over cost-cutting measures. Meates was farewelled from his position by hundreds of people in a guard of honour.

On 29 June 2022 he announced he will run in the race for Christchurch's mayoralty in the October local elections.

== Early life and education ==
Meates was born in Christchurch, and is the seventh child of ten, having eight sisters and one brother. Meates attended high school at St Bede's College, Christchurch. After finishing school he studied a Bachelor of Agricultural Science at University of Canterbury. After graduating from University of Canterbury, Meates started as a Consultant at the Ministry of Agriculture. During his time in the role he met his now wife Julie and they travelled in Africa, India and Asia, before settling in the United Kingdom.

== Career ==
In the United Kingdom Meates began working for BHS (formerly British Home Stores) for 6 years eventually becoming national marketing manager at BHS.

He left his job at BHS to return home to New Zealand to take up the position of General Manager of Greymouth Hospital. One of Meates earliest challenges in the role was the 1995 Cave Creek disaster in which Meates was heavily involved in the identification of the bodies.

Finishing up as Meates oversaw the controversial rebuild of the Hawkes Bay Hospital which involved a merger of Hastings and Napier hospitals.

== Honours ==
In the 2014 Queen's Birthday Honours, Meates was appointed a Member of the New Zealand Order of Merit, for services to health.
