= Bill Meates (rugby union) =

NZ international rugby union player

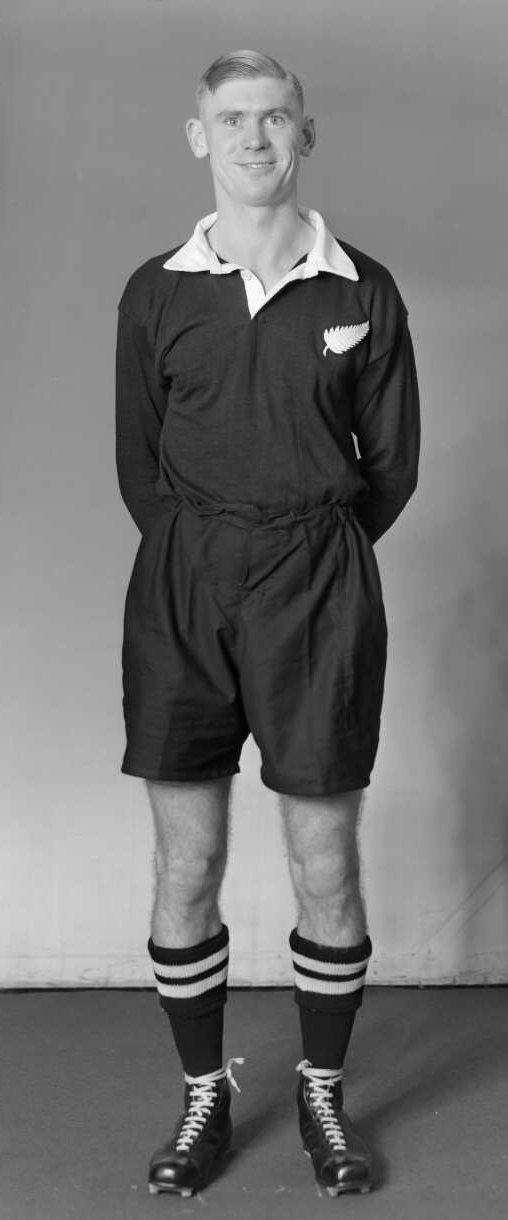
- Meates in 1949
- Born: William Anthony Meates; 26 May 1923 Greymouth, New Zealand
- Died: 1 February 2003 (aged 79) Christchurch, New Zealand
- Height: 1.83 m (6 ft 0 in)
- Weight: 93 kg (205 lb)
- School: Marist Brothers' School; St Bede's College
- University: Canterbury University College
- Notable relative(s): Kevin Meates (brother); David Meates (son)
- Occupation: Schoolteacher

Rugby union career
- Position: Wing three-quarter
Provincial / State sides
Years	Team	Apps	(Points)
1947	Canterbury	2	
1948–1950	Otago		
International career
Years	Team	Apps	(Points)
1949–1950	New Zealand	7	(0)

William Anthony Meates (26 May 1923 – 1 February 2003) was a New Zealand rugby union player, soldier and schoolteacher.

== Biography ==
Meates was born in Greymouth in 1923, and was an elder brother of Kevin Meates. He received his education at Marist Brothers' School, Greymouth, and at St Bede's College in Christchurch. A wing three-quarter, Bill Meates represented Canterbury and Otago at a provincial level, and was a member of the New Zealand national side, the All Blacks, in 1949 and 1950. He played 20 matches for the All Blacks including seven internationals.

Rejected for military service as an 18-year-old because of flat feet, Meates graduated from Christchurch Teachers' Training College in 1944. While there he served as vice-president of the student union, and his future wife Nancy was president. He was subsequently accepted for military service. However, by the time his contingent reached Egypt, Germany had surrendered. Following the end of the war, he toured Britain and France with the 2nd New Zealand Expeditionary Force rugby team, known as the "Kiwis", playing in 13 matches.

Back in New Zealand, worked as a teacher and studied at Canterbury University College, graduating with a Bachelor of Arts in 1954. He taught at Aranui High School in Christchurch for 25 years, rising to deputy principal. As chairman of Sacred Heart Girls' College, he was influential in the integration of Catholic schools into the state system.

With his wife Nancy, Meates had ten children, including David Meates who was CEO of the Canterbury District Health Board for 12 years. He died at Christchurch on 1 February 2003, and was buried at Ruru Lawn Cemetery. His wife, Nancy Meates, died in 2017.
