= John Paul II High School, Greymouth =

John Paul II High School
- Te Kura Tuarua o Hone Paora Tuarua ki Mawhera

Location
- Alexander St, Greymouth, New Zealand; 42.4513°S 171.2120°E

Information
- Type: Integrated secondary (year 9–13) co-ed
- Motto: Christ is the Key
- Established: 1980; 46 years ago (antecedent schools founded in 1882 and 1892)
- Ministry of Education Institution no.: 304
- Chairperson: Alan Berry
- Principal: Renee Hutchinson
- Enrolment: 191 (July 2026)
- International students: 0
- Socio-economic decile: 7
- Website: johnpaul.ac.nz

John Paul II High School, Greymouth is an integrated Catholic, co-educational Year 9 to Year 13 (Form 3–7) secondary school located in Greymouth, New Zealand.

== Ethos ==
The college is proud of its Catholic, Marist and Mercy heritage, encourages student academic and intellectual success holistically — physically, emotionally, spiritually and mentally, and promotes a strong social conscience. The school, which has a strong Catholic focus, is staffed by people who are lay and not members of any religious order.

== History ==
The school was founded in 1980 from the amalgamation of two schools, St Mary's High School, operated by the Sisters of Mercy (who arrived in Greymouth in 1882) and Marist Brothers Boys' School (latterly, the Marist Brothers High School) operated by the Marist Brothers (founded in 1892). John Paul II High School was integrated into the State education system by the agreement of the proprietor of the school the (Catholic Bishop of Christchurch) and the Minister of Education in 1983.

== Principals ==
- Kieran Stone (2016)
- David Sullivan (2019–2021)
- Angela Sloane (2021–2021)
- Renée Hutchinson (2022–present)

== Notable alumni ==
This is a list of notable former students of John Paul II High School, Greymouth and its antecedent schools, St Mary's High School, Greymouth and Marist Brothers High School, Greymouth.

- Paddy Blanchfield MBE JP (1911–1980) – Labour Party member of the New Zealand Parliament for Westland and the West Coast (Marist Brothers).
- Mocky Brereton – former professional rugby league footballer; represented New Zealand in the 1970 and 1972 World Cups and one match in the 1975 World Championship Series (Marist Brothers).
- Peter Bush CNZM QSM (1930–2023) – photographer and photojournalist (Marist Brothers).
- Tony Coll (1949–2020) – professional rugby league footballer and coach; represented New Zealand in three World Cups (Marist brothers).
- Kevin Dixon – rugby league footballer; represented New Zealand in the 1968 World Cup (Marist Brothers).
- George Duggan (1912–2012)– Marist priest, philosopher, seminary professor and writer (Marist Brothers).
- Wayne Dwyer – former rugby league footballer who represented New Zealand (Marist Brothers).
- Graham Kennedy (1939–2002) ("Ginger") – rugby league footballer and coach; represented New Zealand.(Marist Brothers).
- Tony Kokshoorn ONZM (born 1955) – politician, publisher, and activist; Grey District Mayor from 2004 to 2019 (Marist Brothers).
- Charlie McBride (1925–2013) – rugby league player; represented New Zealand (Marist Brothers).
- Bill Meates (1923–2003) – rugby union player, All Black, soldier and school teacher (Marist Brothers).
- Kevin Meates (1930–2022) – rugby union player; All Black (Marist Brothers)
- Ray O'Callaghan (1925–2004) – New Zealand rugby union player; All Black (Marist Brothers).
- Patrick O'Farrell (1933–2003) – historian known for his histories of Roman Catholicism in Australia, Irish history and Irish Australian history (Marist Brothers).
- Pauline O'Regan DCNZM CBE (1922–2019) – nun, school teacher, community worker and writer (St Mary's).
- Maureen Pugh (born 1958) – National Party Member of Parliament; First Assistant Speaker of the House of Representatives (2023–present) (St Mary's).
- Brent Stuart – rugby league and coach and former player who represented New Zealand (Marist Brothers).
- Neville Tiller (1937–2021) – former rugby league footballer; represented New Zealand (Marist Brothers).
- Ruby Tui (born 1991) – rugby sevens player; member of rugby sevens team won the silver medal at the 2016 Summer Olympics tournament; member of the Black Ferns team that won the 2021 Rugby World Cup.

== Notable staff ==
- Mary Gertrude Joyce (1884–1964) – Sister Mary Gertrude RSM, Irish Sister of Mercy nun and musician; taught piano, violin and singing in Greymouth from 1912 to 1949 (St Mary's) – she was the oldest sister of the Irish writer, James Joyce (St Mary's)

== Sources ==
- Pat Gallager, The Marist Brothers in New Zealand Fiji & Samoa 1876–1976, New Zealand Marist Brothers' Trust Board, Tuakau, 1976.
- Greymouth Sisters of Mercy centennial, 1882–1982 : Convent of Mercy Greymouth, Our Lady of Perpetual Succour Convent Brunner, Sacred Heart Convent Cobden, St. Joseph’s Convent Runanga, Greymouth Evening Star, Greymouth 1982.
- Reflect, rejoice : Sisters of Mercy celebrate one hundred years in Greymouth, Mercy Centennial Planning Committee, Greymouth, 1982.
- Michael O'Meeghan S.M., Held firm by faith : a history of the Catholic Diocese of Christchurch, 1840–1987, Catholic Diocese of Christchurch, Christchurch, 1988.
- Peter Kerridge, Marist memories, 100 : a 1992 record of the presence in Greymouth over the last one hundred years of the Marist Brothers, the schools that have developed in that time, and the activities of some of the pupils who have been prepared so well for life in the community, 1892 – 1992, Marist Brothers Centennial Celebrations Committee, Greymouth, 1992.
- Michael King, God's farthest outpost : a history of Catholics in New Zealand, Viking, Auckland 1997.
- John Paul II High School School Prospectus 2012
