= 2022 Christchurch mayoral election =

- 8 October 2022
- Turnout: 118,728 (43.82%)
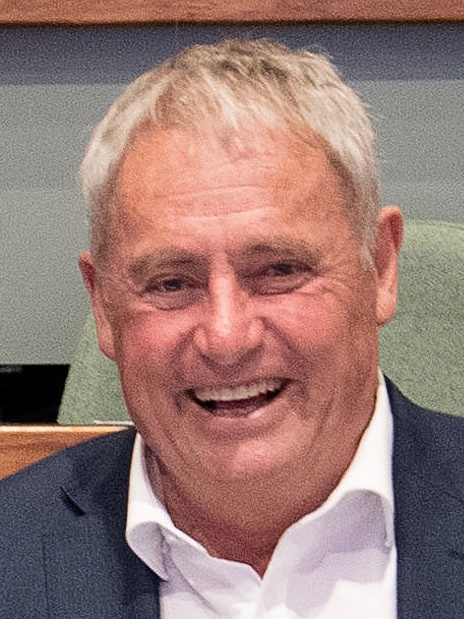

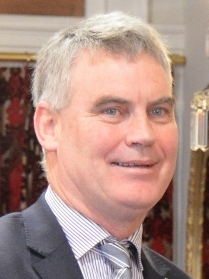
Candidate	Phil Mauger	David Meates
Party	Independent	Independent
Popular vote	53,569	51,298
Percentage	45.11%	43.21%
- Margin of victory by ward
Mayor before election
Lianne Dalziel
Independent
Elected mayor
Phil Mauger
Independent

The 2022 Christchurch mayoral election was a local election held from 16 September to 8 October in Christchurch, New Zealand, as part of that year's city council election and nation-wide local elections. Voters elected the mayor of Christchurch for the 2022–2025 term of the Christchurch City Council. Postal voting and the first-past-the-post voting system was used.

Incumbent third-term mayor Lianne Dalziel did not run for re-election. Centre-right independent Phil Mauger narrowly defeated centre-left independent David Meates.

== Campaign ==
Phil Mauger, who was first elected as a city councillor at the 2019 local elections, was the first to declare his candidacy 14 months out from the election. He said in August 2021 that he would stand for mayor only and not also contest his incumbent council seat.

The Wizard of New Zealand was the next to declare his candidacy in December 2021.

David Meates, the former Canterbury District Health Board chief executive, announced his candidacy in June 2022.

=== Debates ===
A debate between the 2 frontrunner candidates Phil Mauger and David Meates was hosted by Stuff on 16 September 2022.

=== Endorsements ===
==== Phil Mauger ====
- Gerry Brownlee, current National Party MP
- James Gough
- Aaron Keown

==== David Meates ====
- Raf Manji

== List of candidates ==
=== Declared ===
Candidate	Photo	Affiliation	Notes
Carl Bromley		Independent	Founder of the Life Connection Missionary Baptist Fellowship
Mark Chirnside		Chirny for Mayor	Business owner
Tubby Hansen		Economic Euthenics	Perennial candidate
Stephen Jelley		Stop the Stadium	
Drucilla Kingi-Patterson		Independent	
Phil Mauger		Let's Get Stuff Done	Business owner and city councillor
David Meates		Listens, Leads, and Gets Results	Former Canterbury District Health Board chief executive
Nikora Nitro		Independent	
Sam Park		None	
The Wizard of New Zealand		Independent	
Peter Wakeman		Independent	Perennial candidate

=== Declined ===
- Jimmy Chen, Christchurch councillor
- Melanie Coker, Christchurch councillor
- Pauline Cotter, Christchurch councillor
- Lianne Dalziel, incumbent mayor
- Mike Davidson, Christchurch councillor
- Ruth Dyson, former Labour MP
- Anne Galloway, Christchurch councillor
- James Gough, Christchurch councillor
- Yani Johanson, Christchurch councillor
- Raf Manji, former city councillor, former leader of The Opportunities Party
- Jake McLellan, Christchurch councillor
- John Minto, activist and 2019 mayoral candidate
- Garry Moore, former Christchurch mayor
- Darryll Park, business owner and 2019 mayoral candidate
- Eugenie Sage, Green MP
- Sara Templeton, Christchurch councillor
- Andrew Turner, Christchurch deputy mayor
- Nicky Wagner, former National MP
- Duncan Webb, Labour MP
- Megan Woods, Labour MP

== Opinion polling ==
Date	Polling organisation	Carl Bromley	Mark Chirnside	Tubby Hansen	Stephen Jelley	Drucilla Kingi-Patterson	Phil Mauger	David Meates	Nikora Nitro	Sam Park	Peter Wakeman	The Wizard of New Zealand
29 August–4 September 2022	Q+A–Kantar	2	1	1	2	0	58	26	<0.5	3	1	5

== Results ==
2022 Christchurch mayoral election
Party	Candidate	Votes	%	±%
Independent	Phil Mauger	53,569	45.11	
Independent	David Meates	51,298	43.21	
Independent	Mark Chirnside	4,673	3.94	
Independent	Carl Bromley	2,807	2.36	
Independent	The Wizard of New Zealand	2,474	2.08	
Independent	Nikora Nitro	1,035	0.87	
Independent	Peter Wakeman	964	0.81	
Independent	Drucilla Kingi-Patterson	800	0.68	
Independent	Sam Park	479	0.40	
Economic Euthenics	Tubby Hansen	293	0.25	
Independent	Stephen Jelley	237	0.20	
Informal votes		99	0.08	
Majority		2,271	1.91	
Turnout		118,728	43.82	
Registered electors		270,959		
