= Pauline O'Regan =

New Zealand teacher and writer (1922–2019)

Pauline O'Regan DCNZM CBE

Principal of Villa Maria College
- In office 1950–1966

Principal of Mercy College, Timaru
- In office 1967–1968

Personal details
- Born: Pauline Margaret O'Regan; 28 June 1922 Reefton, New Zealand
- Died: 2 May 2019 (aged 96) Christchurch, New Zealand

Pauline Margaret O'Regan DCNZM CBE (28 June 1922 – 2 May 2019) was a New Zealand school teacher, community worker and writer.

== Biography ==
Born in Reefton on 28 June 1922, O'Regan was the daughter of Margaret Mary O'Regan (née Barry) and John Joseph O'Regan. She was educated at St Mary's High School in Greymouth, and entered the religious order of the Sisters of Mercy Ngā Whaea Atawhai o Aotearoa in Christchurch in 1942. She professed as a Sister of Mercy two years later, in 1944. O'Regan graduated from Canterbury University College with a Master of Arts in history in 1954.

Between 1950 and 1966, O'Regan was principal of Villa Maria College in Christchurch. During her tenure, the school roll increased from 48 to 450 students, academic standards rose, and she oversaw the building programme required to accommodate the roll growth. She then served as principal of Mercy College, Timaru from 1967 to 1968, and was a staff member at Aranui High School, Christchurch, from 1973 to 1977.

From 1973, O'Regan lived in the Aranui Community of Sisters of Mercy, to work in the community and train local women to become community leaders. In 1979, she was a Churchill Fellow, travelling to the United States and Britain to study community development, and from 1986 to 1991 she was a board member of the Winston Churchill Memorial Trust in New Zealand.

O'Regan began writing in the early 1980s, and published books on subjects including community development and her views of the Catholic church. She died in Christchurch on 2 May 2019.

== Honours ==
In the 1990 New Year Honours, O'Regan was appointed a Commander of the Order of the British Empire, for services to education and the community. In the 2001 Queen's Birthday Honours, she was appointed a Distinguished Companion of the New Zealand Order of Merit, also for services to education and the community. Following the restoration of titular honours by the New Zealand government in 2009, O'Regan declined redesignation as a Dame Companion of the New Zealand Order of Merit.

== Publications ==
Books written by O'Regan include:

- O'Regan, Pauline (1986). A changing order. Port Nicholson Press.
- O'Regan, Pauline; O'Connor, Teresa (1989). Community: give it a go!. Allen & Unwin.
- O'Regan, Pauline (1991). Aunts and windmills. Bridget Williams Books. ISBN 0908912013.
- O'Regan, Pauline (1995). There is hope for a tree. Bridget Williams Books. ISBN 1869401328.
- O'Regan, Pauline (2004). Miles to go: a book to make you laugh out loud. Penguin. ISBN 9780143007821.
