= 2022 Masterton District Council election =

Local election in New Zealand

- 8 October 2022
- Mayoral election

Candidate	Gary Caffell	Craig Bowyer
Affiliation	Independent	Independent
Popular vote	5,455	1,335
Percentage	58.37%	14.28%
Mayor before election
Lyn Patterson
Independent
Elected mayor
Gary Caffell
Independent
- Council election
- 10 seats on the Masterton District Council; 6 seats needed for a majority
Party	Seats	+/–
Independents	10	0
This lists parties that won seats. See the complete results below.

The 2022 Masterton District Council election was a local election held from 16 September until 8 October 2022 in the Masterton District of New Zealand as part of that year's nation-wide local elections. Voters elected the mayor of Masterton and 8 district councillors for the 2022–2025 term of the Masterton District Council. Postal voting and the first-past-the-post voting system were used for the election.

== Background ==
=== Representation ===
The Masterton District Council review of representation in 2021 resulted in the establishment of a Māori ward and a reduction in the number of councillors from ten to eight.

== Results ==
=== Mayor ===
Incumbent mayor Lyn Patterson chose not to stand for re-election.

Candidate	Party	Votes	%
Gary Caffell	Masterton Matters	5,455	58.37
Craig Bowyer	Masterton The Way You Want It	1,335	14.28
Jo Hayes	Independent	930	9.95
Tina Nixon	Our District, Our Taxes, Our Decisions	895	9.58
William Izard	Independent	650	6.95
Hakepa	Independent	81	0.87
Total		9,346	100.00
Valid votes		9,346	97.51
Invalid/blank votes		239	2.49
Total votes		9,585	100.00

=== Council ===
==== Masterton/Whakaoriori general ward ====
The Masterton/Whakaoriori general ward returned four councillors to the district council.

Candidate	Party	Votes	%
Bex Johnson†	A Voice For Our Community	5,753	18.14
Gary Caffell† (withdrawn)*	Masterton Matters	5,585	17.61
Tom Hullena	Independent	4,755	14.99
Tim Nelson†	Independent	4,292	13.53
Craig Bowyer	Masterton The Way You Want It	2,881	9.09
Dick Graham	Progress not Procrastination	2,631	8.30
Chris Peterson	Independent	2,417	7.62
Peter James	Independent	1,910	6.02
Ryan Soriano	Independent	1,487	4.69
Total		31,711	100.00
Valid votes		31,711	99.69
Invalid/blank votes		98	0.31
Total votes		31,809	100.00

*Withdrawn due to being elected as mayor
†Incumbent candidate

==== Masterton/Whakaoriori Māori ward ====
The Masterton/Whakaoriori Māori ward returned one councillor to the district council. Marama Tuuta was elected unopposed.

==== Council at-large ====
Three councillors were returned to the district council by the district at-large.

Candidate	Party	Votes	%
David Holmes†	Independent	4,810	19.61
Stella Lennox	Next Generation Councillor	4,278	17.44
Brent Goodwin	Reduce staff and Civic Centre costs	4,028	16.42
Hewitt Harrison	Affordability and Accountability	3,671	14.97
Brent (BG) Gare†	Independent	3,460	14.11
Sandy Ryan†	Community at heart	2,853	11.63
Drew Hullah	Independent	983	4.01
Hakepa	Independent	447	1.82
Total		24,530	100.00
Valid votes		24,530	98.88
Invalid/blank votes		277	1.12
Total votes		24,807	100.00

†Incumbent candidate

== Other local elections ==
Masterton voters also be voted in concurrent local elections for the:

- Masterton Community Trust;
- Masterton Trust Lands Trust; and
- Montfort Trimble Foundation.
