= Kevin Dixon (rugby league) =

NZ international rugby league footballer

Personal information
- Full name: John Kevin Dixon
- Born: 17 September 1943 (age 82) Greymouth, New Zealand

Playing information
- Position: Second-row
Club
Years	Team	Pld	T	G	FG	P
	Marist (WCRL)
1971	Cronulla-Sutherland	4	1	0	0	3
	Total	4	1	0	0	3
Representative
Years	Team	Pld	T	G	FG	P
	West Coast
1965–70	New Zealand	10	1	0	0	3

Kevin Dixon is a New Zealand former rugby league footballer who represented New Zealand in the 1968 World Cup.

== Early life ==
Dixon was born in Greymouth and was educated at, and first played rugby league for, Marist Brothers High School, Greymouth.

== Playing career ==
A West Coast representative, Dixon made his debut for the New Zealand national rugby league team in 1965 in the second test match against Australia. He went on to play in ten test matches for New Zealand, including at the 1968 World Cup.

In 1971 Dixon moved to Sydney and played for the Cronulla-Sutherland Sharks in the NSWRL Premiership.

== Coaching career ==
In 1991 Dixon coached Nelson against Marlborough.
