= 2022 Marlborough District Council election =

Local election in New Zealand

- 8 October 2022

District council election
- Turnout: 15,641(44.1%)
- Seats: 14 Independents

Mayoral election
- Turnout: 15,641 (44.1%)

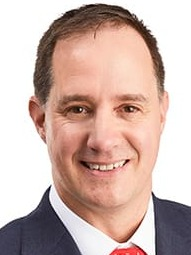
| Candidate | Nadine Taylor | Matt Flight |
| Affiliation | None | None |
| Vote count | — | — |
| • First | 12,431 | 2,230 |
| • FPv% | 79.48 | 14.26 |
Mayor before election
John Leggett
Independent
Elected mayor
Nadine Taylor
Independent
- First preference vote share of elected members

The 2022 Marlborough District Council election was held on 8 October 2022 as part of the wider 2022 New Zealand local elections to elect members to sub-national councils and boards. These elections covered one district council, consisting of fourteen district councillors and one mayor.

== Council ==
=== Mayor ===
2022 Marlborough mayoral election
| Affiliation | Candidate | Votes at iteration | FPv% |
| Affiliation | Candidate | 1 | FPv% |
|---|---|---|---|
| None | Nadine Taylor | 12,431 | 79.48 |
| None | Matt Flight | 2,230 | 14.26 |
| None | Chris Lippiatt | 431 | 2.76 |
| Money Free NZ | Richard Osmaston | 251 | 1.60 |
| Informal | | 20 | 0.13 |
| Blank | | 278 | 1.78 |
| Turnout | | 15,641 | |

=== Council ===
Summary of results
| Ward | Incumbent | Elected |
|---|---|---|
| Marlborough Māori | New ward | Allanah Riria Burgess |
| Marlborough Sounds | Barbara Faulls | |
| Marlborough Sounds | Nadine Taylor | Ben Minehan |
| Marlborough Sounds | David Oddie | Raylene Innes |
| Wairau-Awatere | Gerald Hope | |
| Wairau-Awatere | Cynthia Brooks | Scott Adams |
| Wairau-Awatere | Francis Maher | Sally Arbuckle |
| Blenheim | Jamie Arbuckle | |
| Blenheim | David Croad | |
| Blenheim | Thelma Sowman | |
| Blenheim | Brian George Dawson | |
| Blenheim | Jenny Andrews | Matt Flight |
| Blenheim | Mark Peters | Deborah Dalliessi |
| Blenheim | Michael Fitzpatrick | Jonathan Rosene |

==== Details ====
Marlborough Sounds Ward (Note: Votes rounded down to whole votes)
| Affiliation | Candidate | Votes at iteration | | | | | | | | | | FPv% |
| Affiliation | Candidate | 1 | 2 | 3 | 4 | 5 | 6 | 7 | 8 | 9 | 10 | FPv% |
|---|---|---|---|---|---|---|---|---|---|---|---|---|
| None | Barbara Faulls | 1,425 | 725 | 712 | 709 | 714 | 721 | 695 | 714 | 654 | 633 | 24.37 |
| None | Ben Minehan | 340 | 571 | 589 | 629 | 671 | 775 | 698 | 745 | 665 | 636 | 11.43 |
| None | Raylene Innes | 193 | 335 | 342 | 370 | 404 | 448 | 483 | 573 | 628 | 648 | 6.49 |
| None | Frith Chamberlain | 316 | 387 | 399 | 414 | 438 | 467 | 485 | 542 | 570 | 580 | 10.62 |
| None | John Wedde | 180 | 219 | 233 | 241 | 286 | 328 | 345 | | | | 6.05 |
| Independent | David R McInnes | 160 | 234 | 244 | 251 | 262 | | | | | | 5.38 |
| None | Kim Saunders-Singer | 122 | 155 | 163 | 186 | | | | | | | 4.10 |
| Independent | Dai Mitchell | 99 | 119 | 130 | | | | | | | | 3.33 |
| None | John Reuhman | 68 | 77 | | | | | | | | | 2.29 |
| Informal | | 24 | | | | | | | | | | 0.81 |
| Blank | | 48 | | | | | | | | | | 1.61 |
| Turnout | | 2,975 | | | | | | | | | | |

Wairau-Awatere Ward
| Affiliation | Candidate | Votes at iteration | | | | | | FPv% |
| Affiliation | Candidate | 1 | 2 | 3 | 4 | 5 | 6 | FPv% |
|---|---|---|---|---|---|---|---|---|
| None | Gerald Hope | 1,377 | 955 | 942 | 894 | 885 | 882 | 36.77 |
| None | Scott Adams | 1,068 | 1,055 | 928 | 899 | 885 | 882 | 28.52 |
| None | Sally Arbuckle | 604 | 738 | 846 | 873 | 881 | 883 | 16.13 |
| None | Mike Insley | 522 | 736 | 827 | 863 | 874 | 877 | 13.94 |
| None | Chris Lippiatt | 97 | 109 | | | | | 2.59 |
| Informal | | 18 | | | | | | 0.48 |
| Blank | | 59 | | | | | | 1,58 |
| Turnout | | 3,745 | | | | | | |

Blenheim Ward
| Affiliation | Candidate | Votes at iteration | | | | | | | | | | | | | | | | | | | FPv% |
| Affiliation | Candidate | 1 | 2 | 3 | 4 | 5 | 6 | 7 | 8 | 9 | 10 | 11 | 12 | 13 | 14 | 15 | 16 | 17 | 18 | 19 | FPv% |
|---|---|---|---|---|---|---|---|---|---|---|---|---|---|---|---|---|---|---|---|---|---|
| None | Jamie Arbuckle | 2,255 | 1,091 | 1,113 | 1,073 | 1,061 | 1,052 | 1,043 | 1,034 | 1,059 | 1,034 | 1,018 | 1,006 | 997 | 991 | 987 | 984 | 982 | 981 | 980 | 26.43 |
| None | David Croad | 1,395 | 1,287 | 1,136 | 1,096 | 1,079 | 1,068 | 1,052 | 1,041 | 1,066 | 1,049 | 1,028 | 1,013 | 1,002 | 994 | 989 | 986 | 983 | 981 | 980 | 16.35 |
| None | Matt Flight | 1,102 | 1,306 | 1,109 | 1,089 | 1,071 | 1,065 | 1,049 | 1,038 | 1,085 | 1,043 | 1,026 | 1,011 | 1,001 | 994 | 989 | 985 | 983 | 981 | 980 | 12.91 |
| None | Thelma Sowman | 1,067 | 1,357 | 1,136 | 1,110 | 1,085 | 1,076 | 1,057 | 1,044 | 1,081 | 1,056 | 1,033 | 1,016 | 1,004 | 996 | 990 | 986 | 983 | 982 | 980 | 12.50 |
| None | Deborah Dalliessi | 795 | 1,020 | 1,191 | 1,105 | 1,089 | 1,082 | 1,059 | 1,046 | 1,102 | 1,058 | 1,036 | 1,018 | 1,006 | 997 | 991 | 987 | 984 | 982 | 981 | 9.32 |
| None | Brian George Dawson | 678 | 910 | 1,083 | 1,133 | 1,090 | 1,076 | 1,062 | 1,047 | 1,078 | 1,065 | 1,038 | 1,020 | 1,007 | 997 | 991 | 987 | 984 | 982 | 981 | 7.95 |
| None | Jonathan Rosene | 357 | 424 | 479 | 523 | 558 | 604 | 633 | 653 | 758 | 821 | 869 | 904 | 929 | 947 | 959 | 968 | 974 | 977 | 980 | 4.18 |
| None | Cyril Dawson | 417 | 540 | 592 | 633 | 664 | 699 | 722 | 739 | 810 | 855 | 889 | 914 | 932 | 944 | 953 | 958 | 962 | 965 | 967 | 4.89 |
| None | Haysley MacDonald | 273 | 328 | 371 | 404 | 430 | 469 | 490 | 506 | | | | | | | | | | | | 3.20 |
| None | Ni Fruean | 69 | 76 | 85 | 96 | 103 | | | | | | | | | | | | | | | 0.81 |
| Informal | | 48 | | | | | | | | | | | | | | | | | | | 0.56 |
| Blank | | 77 | | | | | | | | | | | | | | | | | | | 0.90 |
| Turnout | | 8,533 | | | | | | | | | | | | | | | | | | | |

Marlborough Māori Ward
| Affiliation | Candidate | Votes at iteration | FPv% |
| Affiliation | Candidate | 1 | FPv% |
|---|---|---|---|
| None | Allanah Riria Burgess | 216 | 55.67 |
| None | Tony MacDonald | 147 | 37.89 |
| Informal | | 4 | 1.03 |
| Blank | | 21 | 5.41 |
| Turnout | | 388 | |
