= Neville Tiller =

New Zealand international rugby league footballer

Personal information
- Full name: Neville Tiller
- Born: 4 August 1937 Sydney, Australia
- Died: 5 May 2021 (aged 83)

Playing information
Club
Years	Team	Pld	T	G	FG	P
	Marist
Representative
Years	Team	Pld	T	G	FG	P
1961	New Zealand	3	0	0	0	0
- As of 11 January 2024

Neville Tiller (4 August 1937 – 5 May 2021) was a New Zealand former rugby league footballer who represented New Zealand.

== Early life ==
Tiller was born in Sydney. He was educated at Marist Brothers High School, Greymouth.

== Playing career ==
Tiller toured Great Britain and France with the Kiwis in 1961.
