= Kevin Meates =

NZ international rugby union player (1930–2022)

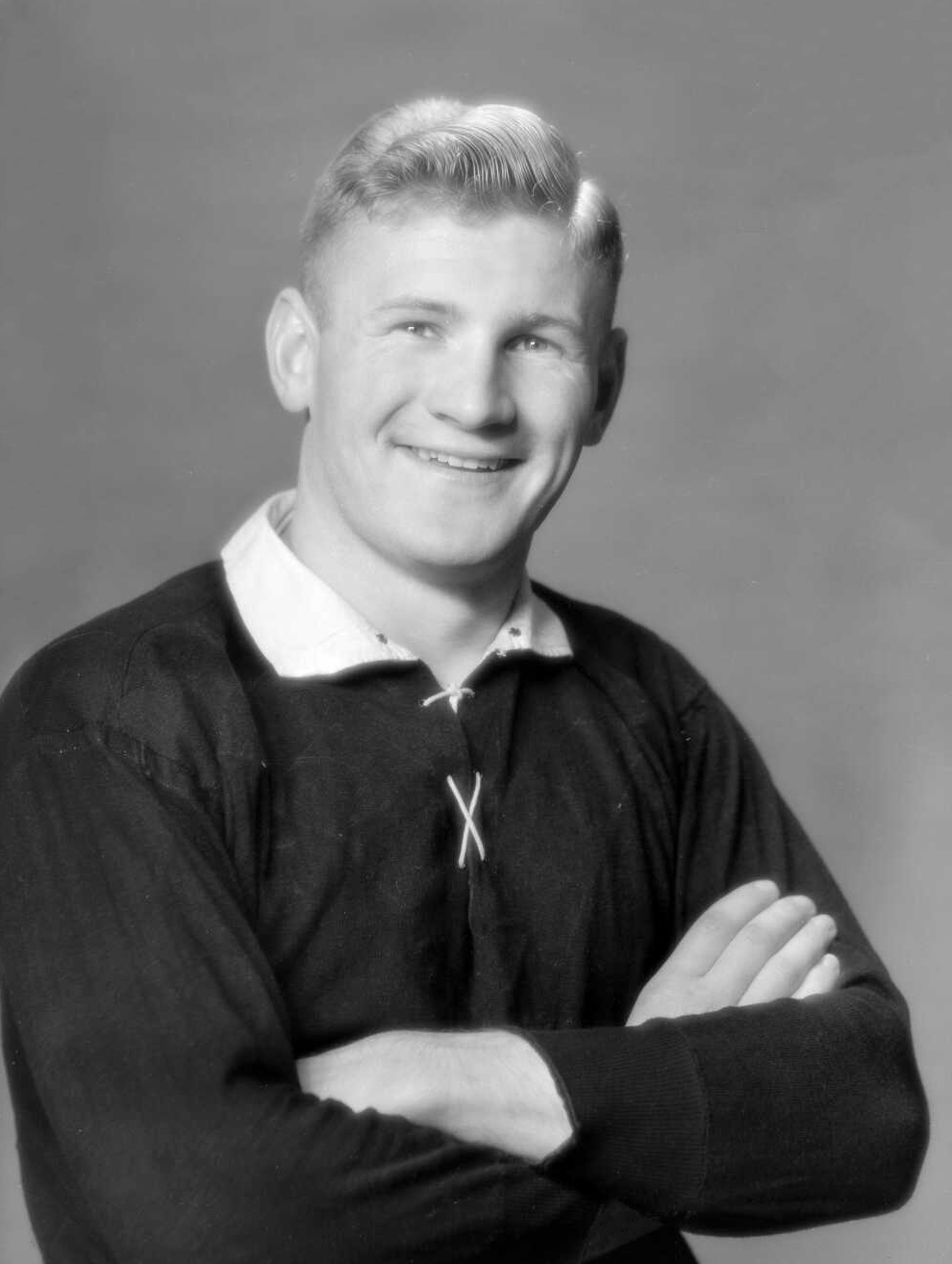
- Meates, c. 1952
- Born: Kevin Francis Meates; 20 February 1930 Greymouth, New Zealand
- Died: 17 April 2022 (aged 92) Christchurch, New Zealand
- Height: 1.88 m (6 ft 2 in)
- Weight: 95 kg (209 lb)
- School: St Bede's College; Marist Brothers School, Greymouth
- University: Canterbury University College
- Notable relative(s): Bill Meates (brother); David Meates (nephew)

Rugby union career
- Position(s): Flanker; Lock
Provincial / State sides
Years	Team	Apps	(Points)
1951–57	Canterbury	44	
International career
Years	Team	Apps	(Points)
1952	New Zealand	2	(0)

Kevin Francis Meates (20 February 1930 – 17 April 2022) was a New Zealand rugby union player. A flanker, sometimes playing at lock, Meates represented Canterbury at a provincial level. He was a member of the New Zealand national side, the All Blacks, in 1952, appearing in two internationals for the All Blacks against the touring Australian team in 1952.

Meates was the younger brother of Bill Meates, another rugby player, and uncle of David Meates (his brother Bill's son). He graduated from Canterbury University College with a Bachelor of Science in 1952.

Meates died in Christchurch on 17 April 2022, at the age of 92.
