= 2022 Queenstown-Lakes District Council election =

Election in New Zealand

← 2019	8 October 2022	2025 →
- Turnout: 44.47% ▼5.81 pp (12,492 out of 28,088 enrolled voters)
- Mayoral election
Candidate	Glyn Lewers	Jon Mitchell
Party	Independent	Communities First
Popular Vote	4,382	3,796
Percentage	35.08%	30.39%
Mayor before election
Jim Boult
Independent
Elected mayor
Glyn Lewers
Independent
- Council election
- All 11 seats available
Party	Leader	Vote %	Seats	+/–
Independents			11	+1
This lists parties that won seats. See the complete results below.

The 2022 Queenstown-Lakes District Council election took place between 16 September and 8 October 2022 via postal vote as part of nation-wide local elections.

== Electoral System ==
Alongside the mayor, there are eleven councillors elected across three wards. The three wards are Queenstown-Whakatipu (four councillors), Wānaka-Upper Clutha (four councillors), and Arrowtown-Kawarau (three councillors). The ward arrangements are new following a representation review in 2021.

This replaced the previous structure of three wards: Queenstown-Wakatipu (six councillors), Arrowtown (one councillor), and Wānaka (three councillors). Wānaka-Upper Clutha retains the same boundaries as the former Wānaka ward, but was renamed and gained an additional councillor. Queenstown-Whakatipu largely covers the same area as Queenstown-Wakatipu, although it transferred its eastern area (including the settlements of Gibbston, Arthurs Point, Shotover Country and Lake Hayes Estate) to the newly created Arrowtown-Kawarau.

All officials were elected through a first-past-the-post system via postal voting.

== Mayoral Election ==
The incumbent Mayor, Jim Boult, decided not to stand after serving two terms. Glyn Lewers, a sitting councillor was elected mayor.

=== Results ===
2022 Queenstown-Lakes mayoral election
Party	Candidate	Votes	%	±%
Independent	Glyn Lewers	4,382	35.08	
Communities First	Jon Mitchell	3,796	30.39	
Fresh Thinking. Innovation. Transparency	Olivia Wensley	2,531	20.26	
Independent	Al Angus	821	6.57	−4.77
Independent	Neeta Shetty	541	4.33	
Independent	Daniel Shand	201	1.61	
Informal votes		20	0.16	−0.03
Blank ballots		200	1.60	0.02
Majority		586	4.69	
Turnout		12,492	44.47	−5.81

== Council ==
=== Queenstown-Whakatipu Ward ===
The Queenstown-Whakatipu ward returned four councillors to the district council. Councillors Valerie Miller and Penny Clark who represented the former Queenstown-Wakatipu ward decided not to stand for re-election.

At-large ward
Party	Candidate	Votes	%	±%
Independent	Matt Wong	2,338	20.94	
Independent	Esther Whitehead	1,972	17.66	
Independent	Gavin Bartlett	1,705	15.27	
Independent	Niki Gladding	1,626	14.56	
Independent	Peter Newport	1,101	9.86	
Independent	Claire Turnham	1,049	9.39	
Independent	Tony Dorner	625	5.60	
Independent	Mary Weston	375	3.36	
Independent	Stevey Chernishov	169	1.51	
Informal votes		3	0.03	
Blank ballots		204	1.83	
Majority		525		

=== Arrowtown-Kawarau Ward ===
The Arrowtown-Kawarau ward returned three councillors to the district council.

At-large ward
Party	Candidate	Votes	%	±%
Independent	Craig Ferguson	2,540	29.67	
Independent	Lisa Guy	1,893	22.11	
Independent	Neeta Shetty	1,542	18.01	
Independent	Nell Hunter	1,162	13.57	
Independent	Melissa White	1,081	12.63	
Independent	Daniel Duvnjak	202	2.36	
Informal votes		2	0.02	
Blank ballots		140	1.64	
Majority		380		

=== Wānaka-Upper Clutha Ward ===
The Wānaka-Upper Clutha ward returned four councillors to the district council. Incumbent councillors Calum MacLeod and Niamh Shaw decided not to stand for re-election.

At-large ward
Party	Candidate	Votes	%	±%
Independent	Quentin Smith	3,583	21.89	
Independent	Barry Bruce	2,658	16.24	
Independent	Lyal Cocks	2,464	15.06	
Independent	Cody Tucker	2,369	14.48	
Independent	John Wellington	2,141	13.08	
Independent	Ross McCarthy	1,879	11.48	
Independent	Daniel Shand	792	4.84	
Independent	Olly Burke	418	2.55	
Informal votes		2	0.01	
Blank ballots		60	0.37	
Majority		228		

== Other local elections ==
Depending on where in Queenstown-Lakes they lived, voters also voted in concurrent local elections for the:

- Wānaka-Upper Clutha Community Board
