= 2022 Kāpiti Coast District Council election =

Local election in New Zealand

- 8 October 2022
- Turnout: 19,718 (45.8%)
- Mayoral election
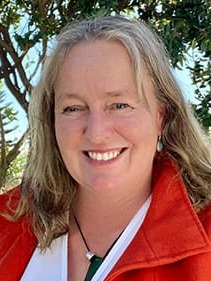

Candidate	Janet Holborow	Rob McCann
Affiliation	Independent	Independent
Primary vote	5,538	4,587
Percentage	28.09%	23.26%
Final vote	7,819	7,537
Mayor before election
K Gurunathan
Independent
Elected mayor
Janet Holborow
Independent
- Council election
- 10 seats on the Kāpiti Coast District Council; 6 seats needed for a majority
Party	Seats	+/–
Independents	10	+1
Labour	0	−1
This lists parties that won seats. See the complete results below.

The 2022 Kāpiti Coast District Council election was a local election held from 16 September until 8 October in the Kāpiti Coast District of New Zealand as part of that year's nation-wide local elections. Voters elected the mayor of Kāpiti Coast, 10 district councillors, and other local representatives for the 2022–2025 term of the Kāpiti Coast District Council. Postal voting and the single transferable vote system were used.

== Background ==
=== Voting system ===
The Kāpiti Coast District Council used the single transferable vote system to elect the Mayor of Kāpiti Coast and district councillors for the 2022–2025 term. The positions of mayor and ten district councillors were contested by the following candidates:

== Results ==
=== Mayor ===
Incumbent mayor K Gurunathan chose not to stand for re-election.

2022 Kāpiti Coast mayoral election
Affiliation	Candidate	Votes at iteration					FPv%
Affiliation	Candidate	1	2	3	4	5	FPv%
Independent	Janet Holborow	5,538	5,902	6,065	6,792	7,819	28.09
Independent	Rob McCann	4,587	4,736	5,086	6,051	7,537	23.26
Independent	Chris Mitchell	3,358	3,531	4,023	4,833	0	17.03
Independent	Martin Halliday	2,944	3,099	3,417	0		14.93
None	Murray Lobb	1,717	1,828	0			8.71
None	Michelle Lewis	1,326	0				6.72
Informal		47					0.24
Blank		220					1.12
Turnout		19,718					

=== Council ===
==== Summary ====
Summary of results
Ward	Incumbent	Elected
District Wide	Angela Buswell	Liz Koh
District Wide	Gwynn Compton	Rob Kofoed
District Wide	Jackie Elliott	Lawrence Kirby
Ōtaki	James Cootes	Shelly Warwick
Waikanae	Jocelyn Prvanov	
Waikanae	New ward	Nigel Wilson
Paekākāriki-Raumati	Sophie Handford	
Paraparaumu	Martin Halliday	
Paraparaumu	Bernie Randall	Glen Cooper
Paraparaumu	New ward	Kathy Spiers

==== Ōtaki ward ====
Affiliation	Candidate	Votes at iteration	FPv%
Affiliation	Candidate	1	FPv%
None	Shelly Warwick	1,468	56.35
None	Chris Papps	1,046	40.15
Informal		3	0.12
Blank		88	3.38
Turnout		2,605	

==== Waikanae ward ====
Affiliation	Candidate	Votes at iteration				FPv%
Affiliation	Candidate	1	2	3	4	FPv%
Independent	Jocelyn Prvanov	2,029	2,090	2,003	2,133	31.68
None	Nigel Wilson	1,868	1,949	1,983	2,118	29.17
Independent	Tim Parry	784	816	832	940	12.24
None	Kate Thomson	557	617	634	724	8.7
None	Gerald Ponsford	507	535	542	0	7.92
None	Jordon Wansbrough	317	0			4.95
Informal		26				0.41
Blank		324				5.06
Turnout		6,404				

==== Paraparaumu ward ====
Affiliation	Candidate	Votes at iteration						FPv%
Affiliation	Candidate	1	2	3	4	5	6	FPv%
Independent	Martin Halliday	1,690	1,738	1,850	1,799	2,072	1,819	21.97
None	Glen Cooper	1,551	1,640	1,766	1,779	2,051	1,831	20.16
Independent	Kathy Spiers	1,129	1,181	1,337	1,348	1,586	1,733	14.68
None	Murray Lobb	977	1,026	1,135	1,145	1,296	1,453	12.7
Independent	David Ogden	920	984	1,107	1,116	0		11.96
None	Bernie Randall	675	714	0				8.78
Independent	Martin Frauenstein	397	0					5.16
Informal		55						0.72
Blank		316						4.11
Turnout		7,692						

==== Paekākāriki-Raumati ward ====
Affiliation	Candidate	Votes at iteration	FPv%
Affiliation	Candidate	1	FPv%
None	Sophie Handford	2,015	66.79
Independent	Richard Young	879	29.13
Informal		3	0.10
Blank		120	3.98
Turnout		3,017	

==== District wide ward ====
Affiliation	Candidate	Votes at iteration										FPv%
Affiliation	Candidate	1	2	3	4	5	6	7	8	9	10	FPv%
Independent	Liz Koh	4,179	4,336	4,644	4,961	4,548	4,929	4,441	4,438	4,919	4,386	21.19
None	Rob Kofoed	3,176	3,324	3,545	3,903	4,015	4,370	4,510	4,422	4,987	4,397	16.11
None	Lawrence Kirby	2,343	2,504	2,622	2,866	2,937	3,223	3,312	3,335	3,765	4,094	11.88
Independent	Jackie Elliott	1,847	1,934	2,080	2,261	2,323	2,655	2,735	2,754	3,184	3,466	9.37
None	Michelle Lewis	1,877	2,015	2,130	2,327	2,383	2,588	2,659	2,678	0		9.52
None	Mark Benton	1,504	1,533	1,736	1,873	1,913	0					7.63
Independent	Ian Powell	1,291	1,512	1,669	0							6.55
Independent	Michael Scott	1,354	1,401	0								6.87
None	Maria McMillan	1,130	0									5.73
Informal		172										0.87
Blank		657										3.33
Turnout		19,718										

== Other local elections ==
Voters also elected the members of 5 community boards (Ōtaki, Paekākāriki, Paraparaumu, Raumati, and Waikanae).
