= Ray O'Callaghan =

- Born: Thomas Raymond O'Callaghan; 19 January 1925 Greymouth, New Zealand
- Died: 17 December 2004 (aged 79) Wellington, New Zealand
- Height: 1.80 m (5 ft 11 in)
- Weight: 86 kg (190 lb)
- School: Marist Brothers High School, Greymouth
- Occupation(s): Rugby administrator and coach

Rugby union career
- Position: First five-eighth
Provincial / State sides
Years	Team	Apps	(Points)
- Wellington
International career
Years	Team	Apps	(Points)
1949	New Zealand	1	(3)

Thomas Raymond O'Callaghan (19 January 1925 – 17 December 2004) was a New Zealand rugby union player. A second five-eighth, O'Callaghan represented Wellington at a provincial level. He was a member of the New Zealand national side, the All Blacks, in 1949, playing a single international match against Australia earning 3 points.
