= 2022 Gisborne District Council election =

Local election in New Zealand

- 8 October 2022
- Turnout: 14,738 (43.4%)
- Mayoral election
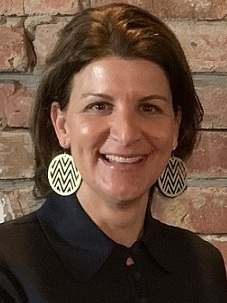

Candidate	Rehette Stoltz	Colin Alder	Rhonda Tibble
Affiliation	None	None	None
Popular vote	8,009	2,943	2,583
Percentage	54.34	19.97	17.53
Mayor before election
Rehette Stoltz
Independent
Elected mayor
Rehette Stoltz
Independent
- Council election
- 14 seats on the Gisborne District Council; 8 seats needed for a majority
Party	Seats	+/–
Independents	13	−1
Ngāti Porou	1	+1
This lists parties that won seats. See the complete results below.

The 2022 Gisborne District Council election was a local election held from 16 September to 8 October in the Gisborne District of New Zealand as part of that year's nation-wide local elections. Voters elected thirteen district councillors for the 2022–2025 term of the Gisborne District Council. Postal voting and the single transferable vote system were used.

== Key dates ==
- 30 June: Electoral Commission enrolment campaign starts.
- First week of July: Enrolment update packs sent by Electoral Commission to electors.
- 12 August: Enrolment closes for the printed electoral roll.
- 16–21 September: Voting documents sent to all enrolled voters by local councils.
- 4 October: Last day to post ballot to ensure delivery.
- 7 October: Last day to enrol to vote.
- 8 October: Polling day — The voting documents must be at the council before voting closes at midday/12:00pm.

== Background ==
=== Voting system ===
The election was the first in the district held under the Single Transferable Vote (STV) system. This meant that voters ranked candidates and if no candidate cleared the necessary threshold the bottom polling candidate's vote was tallied out to the other candidates based on those rankings, this process continuing until all positions were filled.

== Campaign ==
=== Mayoral candidates ===
Incumbent first-term mayor Rehette Stoltz ran for a second term, having cruised to victory against councillor Meredith Akuhata-Brown in 2019 with over 10,000 votes. Born in South Africa she moved to New Zealand in 2001 and later settled in Gisborne. She was first elected to council in 2010 and was previous mayor Meng Foon's deputy. When Foon stepped down Stoltz took up the role of mayor for the period in 2019 before that year's election.

Akuhata-Brown said of Stoltz (when asked whether she would stand again for mayor) that because of Stoltz's background she would find it hard to understand issues affecting Māori, and that because she fit the image of what people expect a mayor to look like that "There's no fight for the position [of mayor], it's handed to her." Akuhata-Brown later apologised for her comments.

Colin Alder was also a candidate; a semi-retired organic farmer, he had never run for office previously. He joined the race because of the actions of Trust Tairawhiti, the local regional development agency. He said he was angry that they were "..putting all their eggs in those baskets and [that] they're selling the cash cow, steady income, rock-solid serve the people business", referring to electricity network asset sales and their focus on "high-risk ventures like forestry."

Darin Brown, another candidate, told Radio New Zealand: "I am not an anti-vaxxer, no way am I an anti-vaxxer, I'm just a pro-choicer, that's it." He had concerns that the council focused too much on vanity projects. A photo surfaced of Brown wearing a hazmat suit defaced with drawings of a swastika and genitalia. The photo was taken around the time of the first lockdown, and Brown claimed to have actually warn it to the supermarket as a protest of the central government's response to the COVID-19 pandemic. Brown was adamant he wasn't a Nazi or white supremacist.

A fluent speaker of te reo Māori, Rhonda Tibble said that she was running because "it's time that tangata whenua occupy this space and that we also have the opportunity to flex muscle in the bi-cultural nature of New Zealand and also the diverse nature of New Zealand." Housing was a key issue for her.

=== General ward candidates ===
Mayoral candidate Darin Brown's wife Jen Brown stood for the general ward. She had attended the anti-mandate and anti-lockdown protests in Wellington earlier that year, which councillor Wharehinga criticised her for. She was anti-vaccine rollout for children and had made posts critical of a transgender swimmer who competed against "biological" women. She rejected the label anti-vax, preferring the term pro-choice. She said she was "definitely not" racist or a right winger, pointing to her husband being Māori as evidence of this claim. She claimed to have taken a test that said she was a "leftist liberal". She confirmed she was a member of Voices for Freedom.

Candidates Ben Florance and Leighton Packer had also attended the Wellington protests. Florance shared posts on social media that accused Prime Minister Jacinda Ardern of having total control of the media. He had previously worked in the military and the Salvation Army. Packer had labelled gay activists as clowns in social media posts, saying that they had been counter-protestors at Wellington and that they had taken actions inappropriate for children to witness.

Peter Jones, another candidate, complained that no party in Parliament represented his COVID denialist beliefs, him having labelled the pandemic a "scam".

=== Campaign events ===
Almost 100 people attended a campaign event on 22 August at Te Poho-o-Rawiri Marae, with 28 candidates making an appearance. Topics of discussion included whether candidates supported the Eastland Network sale, and their opininons on key land issues, the road network, the introduction of a Māori ward and how to secure funding from the central government.

== Results ==
=== Mayor ===
Stoltz was re-elected to a second term. Talking to Local Democracy Reporting she said "I'm very, very happy and excited about the term ahead of us." Stoltz went on to say her major focus would be on issues such as the Resource Management Act review, Three Waters, and the Future of Local Government Review.

The results as declared on 14 October 2022:

Affiliation	Candidate	Iteration	Votes received	FPv%	Status
None	Rehette Stoltz	1	8,009	54.34	Re-elected
None	Colin Alder	1	2,943	19.97	
None	Rhonda Tibble	1	2,583	17.53	
None	Darin Brown	1	969	6.57	
Informal			35	0.24	
Blank			198	1.34	
Turnout			14,738		

=== Council ===
==== Tairāwhiti General Ward ====
The General Ward saw three new councillors elected whilst incumbent three-term councillor Meredith Akuhata-Brown failed to be re-elected.

The results as declared on 14 October 2022:

Affiliation	Candidate	Iteration	Votes received (Note: Rounded to 2 decimal places)	Status
None	Josh Wharehinga	1	1921.00	Re-elected
None	Colin Alder	1	1639.00	Elected
None	Larry Foster	20	1184.60	Re-elected
None	Rob Telfer	22	1169.44	Elected
None	Andy Cranston	23	1201.50	Re-elected
Independent	Debbie Gregory	25	1162.23	Re-elected
None	Tony Robinson	36	1170.18	Re-elected
None	Teddy Thompson	48	1069.99	Elected
Independent	Meredith Akuhata-Brown	48	1022.52	Not re-elected
None	Jen Brown	35	669.86	
None	Charlie Reynolds	28	555.81	
None	Tina Karaitiana	22	411.51	
None	Ben Florance	21	383.20	
None	Alistarmalcolm Mckellow	19	332.63	
None	Jordan Walker	17	322.58	
Independent	Moera Brown	15	245.82	
None	Frank Murphy	14	211.83	
None	Rachel Lodewyk	13	199.54	
None	Hine Moeke-Murray	11	170.17	
None	Leighton Packer	10	141.42	
None	Julian Tilley	9	134.22	
None	Peter Jones	7	108.74	
None	Gareth Mill	6	99.15	
Independent	Dennis Pennefather	4	73.25	
None	Mike Page	3	46.00	
Informal			503	
Blank			125	
Turnout			11,081	

==== Tairāwhiti Māori Ward ====
The new Māori Ward saw five first-term councillors elected.

The results as declared on 14 October 2022:

Affiliation	Candidate	Iteration	Votes received	Status
None	Rhonda Tibble	1	844.00	Elected
None	Aubrey Ria	11	602.30	Elected
None	Nick Tupara	13	618.95	Elected
Independent	Ani Pahuru-Huriwai	17	578.05	Elected
Ngati Porou	Rawinia Parata	18	568.22	Elected
None	Darin Brown	18	389.81	
None	Ian Procter	16	316.42	
None	Jody Toroa	12	245.69	
Independent	Chris Haenga	10	226.30	
None	Agnes Walker	8	199.66	
None	Marijke Warmenhoven	6	131.46	
None	Harawira Pearless	5	123.64	
None	Athena Emmerson	3	118.67	
Informal			60	
Blank			76	
Turnout			3,650	
