= John Stanislaus Joyce =

Father of James Joyce (1849–1931)

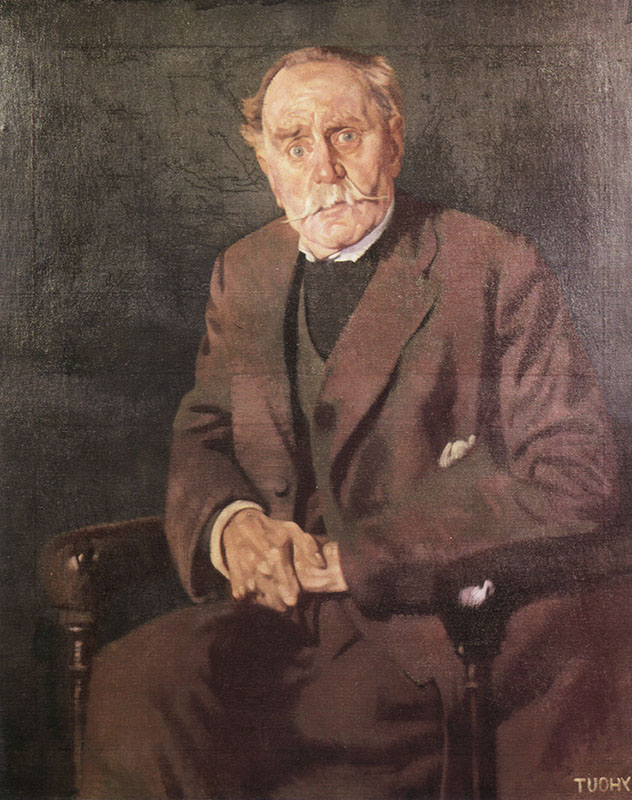
Portrait of John Joyce by Patrick Tuohy

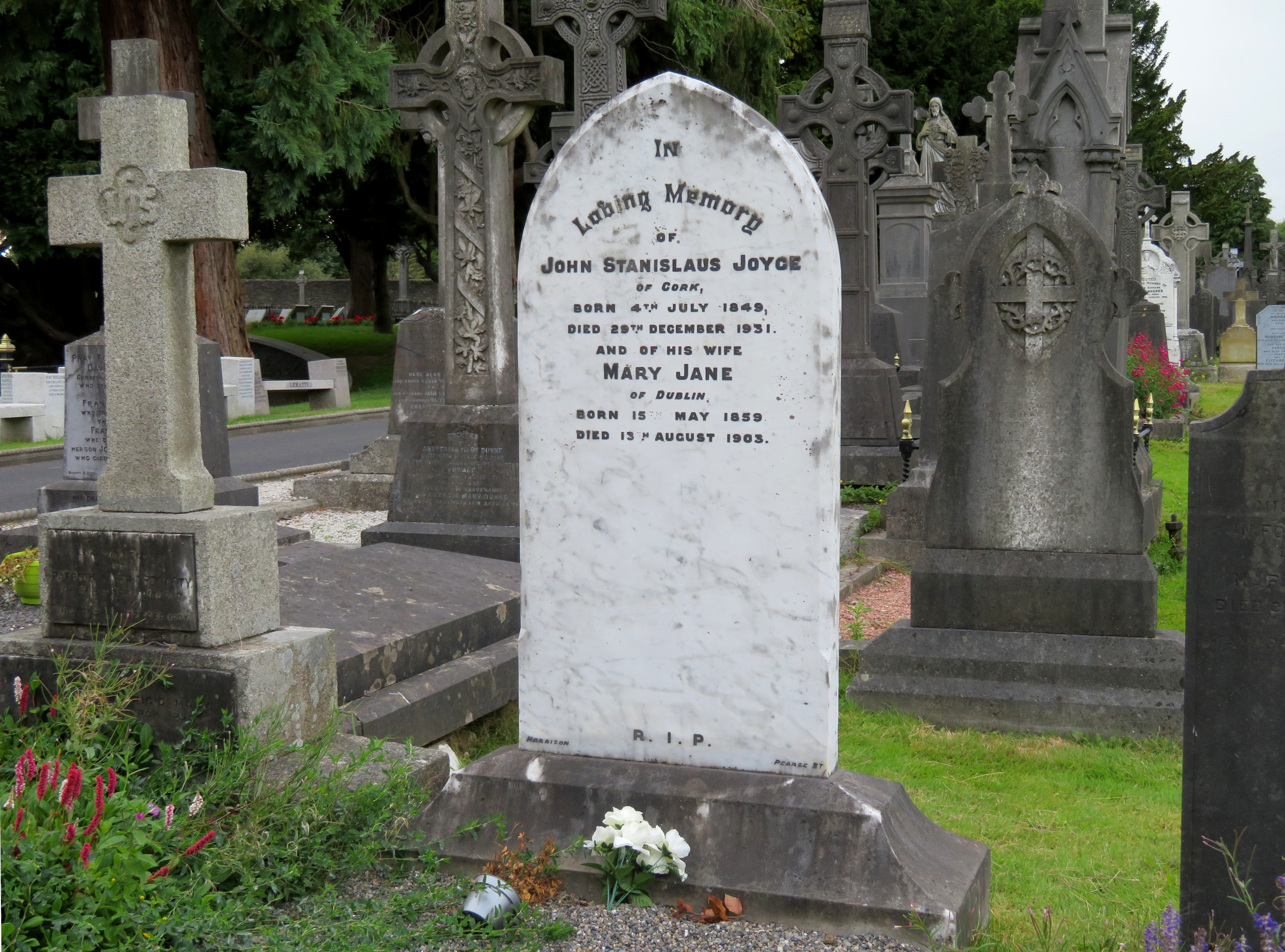
Grave of John Joyce and his wife Mary in Glasnevin Cemetery, Dublin. The grave is within sight of the grave of Charles Stewart Parnell, John Joyce's hero.

John Stanislaus Joyce (4 July 1849 – 29 December 1931) was the father of writer James Joyce, and a well known Dublin man about town. The son of James and Ellen (née O'Connell) Joyce, John Joyce grew up in Cork, where his mother's family, which claimed kinship to "Liberator" Daniel O'Connell, was quite prominent.

Baptised in St. Finbarr's South Church, Joyce grew up in the Anglesea Street area. He attended St Colman's College, Fermoy, from 1859 and later studied medicine at The Queen's College, Cork, from 1867. However, he did not complete his university studies.

Following his father's death in 1866, Joyce inherited substantial property around Cork. Soon after he moved to Dublin, where he worked for several years as secretary at a distillery company. He was noted as a fine tenor singer, although he never pursued a musical career.

On 5 May 1880, Joyce married Mary "May" Murray. That year, as a reward for his work supporting Liberal candidates in the General Election of 1880, Joyce was given a post in the Dublin Custom House.

In 1882, his son James was born, the first of ten surviving children. From eldest to youngest, names and ages given according to the 1901 census: James Augustine (aged 19 in 1901), Margaret Alice (17), John Stanislaus (16), Chales [sic] Patrick (14), George Alfred (13), Eileen (12), May Kathleen (11), Eva May (10), Florence (9) and Mabel (8).

Over the next ten years, Joyce gradually ran through his property. A supporter of the nationalist politician Charles Stewart Parnell, Joyce was crushed by what he saw as Parnell's betrayal and death following the revelation of his adultery with Kitty O'Shea. He remained a committed Parnellite and benefited from the patronage of political colleagues in later life when he had few other sources of income.

By the time of Parnell's death in 1891, Joyce had spent most of his inheritance and had been pensioned from his post at the custom house. A spendthrift, he proved barely able to live on the small pension that was left to him, and spent much of his time drinking. His wife died in 1903, but despite his poor management of the household, he managed to outlive her by 28 years. He died at the age of 82.

Of all his children, Joyce got along well only with his eldest, James, who enjoyed his father's company and shared in some of his traits, including his musical talent and his inability with money. John Joyce inspired several characters in his son's works, such as Simon Dedalus in A Portrait of the Artist as a Young Man and Ulysses, Humphrey Chimpden Earwicker in Finnegans Wake, and the narrator's uncle in the stories "The Sisters" and "Araby" in Dubliners.
