= 2022 Carterton District Council election =

Local election in New Zealand

- 8 October 2022
- Mayoral election
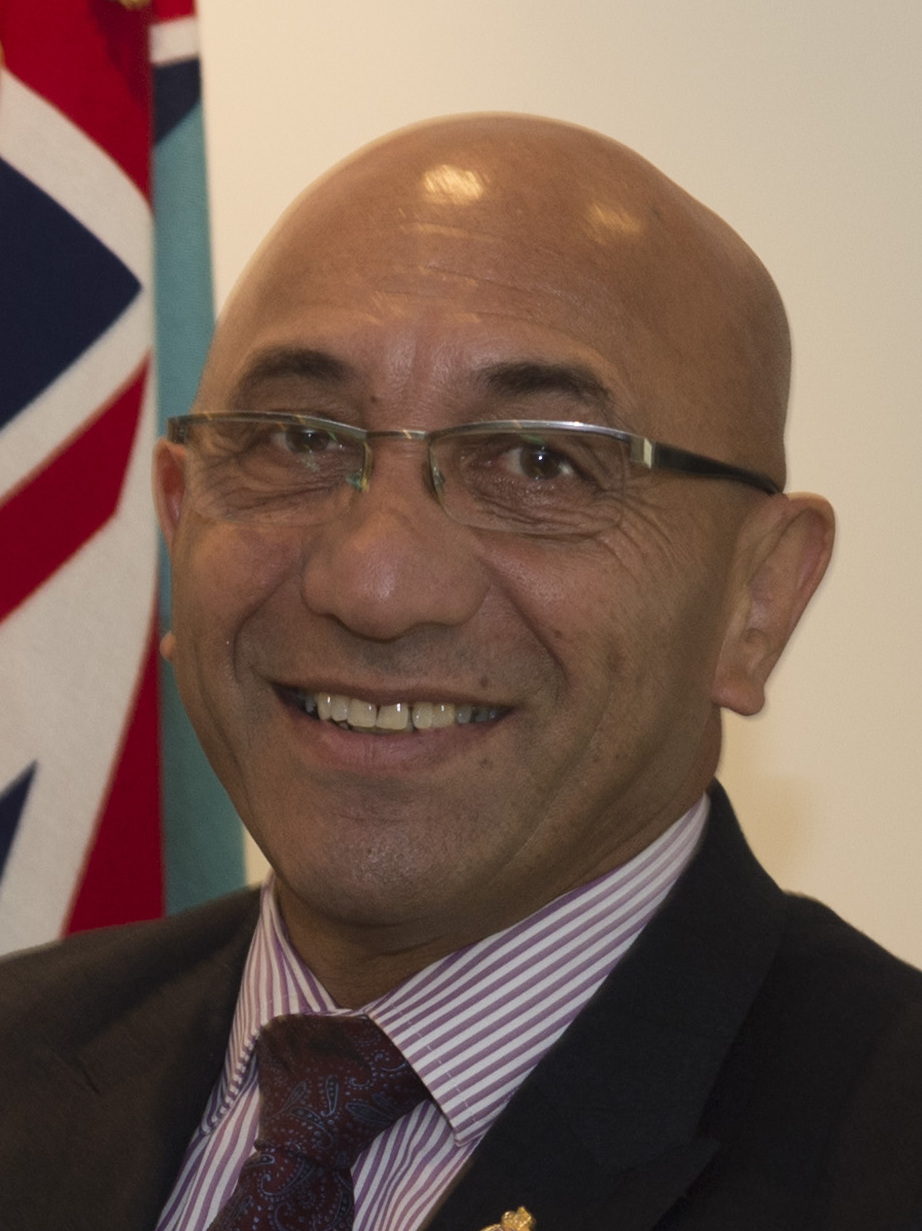

Candidate	Ron Mark	Greg Lang
Affiliation	Independent	Independent
Popular vote	2,475	2,053
Percentage	54.66%	45.34%
Mayor before election
Greg Lang
Independent
Elected mayor
Ron Mark
Independent
- Council election
- 8 seats on the Carterton District Council; 5 seats needed for a majority
Party	Seats	+/–
Independents	8	0
This lists parties that won seats. See the complete results below.

The 2022 Carterton District Council election was a local election held from 16 September until 8 October in the Carterton District of New Zealand as part of that year's nation-wide local elections. Voters elected the mayor of Carterton and 8 district councillors for the 2022–2025 term of the Carterton District Council. Postal voting and the first-past-the-post voting system were used.

== Key dates ==
15 July 2022 Nominations opened for Mayor and Council candidates

12 August 2022 Nominations closed (at 12:00 PM)

17 August 2022 Public notice of candidates' names

16 September 2022 Voting opened; delivery of voting documents via post began

21 September 2022 Delivery of voting documents completed

4 October 2022 Recommended last day to post ballots via NZ Post

8 October 2022 Election Day; voting closed at 12:00 PM

8 October 2022 Progress results released (afternoon)

13–19 October 2022 Official declaration of results (final count)

26 October 2022 Inaugural meeting of the new Council

== List of candidates ==
=== Mayor ===
There was one vacancy for the mayoralty of Carterton. The incumbent Greg Lang stood for re-election, with Ron Mark, former Carterton mayor (2010–2014) and New Zealand First MP (1996–2008 and 2014–2020), standing against him.

== Results ==
=== Mayor ===
Candidate	Party	Votes	%
Ron Mark	Independent	2,475	54.66
Greg Lang†	Independent	2,053	45.34
Total		4,528	100.00
Valid votes		4,528	98.52
Invalid/blank votes		68	1.48
Total votes		4,596	100.00

†Incumbent candidate

=== Council ===
Candidate	Party	Votes	%
Steve Laurence	Independent	2,559	9.29
Dale Williams†	Independent	2,550	9.26
Steve Cretney†	Independent	2,471	8.97
Steve Gallon	Independent	2,411	8.75
Lou Newman	Independent	2,400	8.71
Robyn Cherry-Campbell†	Community at heart	2,148	7.80
Brian Deller†	Independent	2,110	7.66
Grace Ayling	Independent	2,029	7.37
Roger Boulter	Independent	2,000	7.26
Michael O'Donnell	Independent	1,792	6.51
Jill Greathead†	Refreshing Local Democracy	1,515	5.50
Andy Rogers	Independent	1,310	4.76
Ben Dugdale	Independent	1,241	4.51
Thomas Lissington	Independent	1,011	3.67
Total		27,547	100.00
Valid votes		27,547	99.56
Invalid/blank votes		121	0.44
Total votes		27,668	100.00

†Incumbent candidate
