= 2022 New Zealand local elections =

Local elections in New Zealand

- 8 October 2022
- 77 of 78 councils
Party	Councils	+/–
missing info		
This lists parties that won seats. See the complete results below.
- 67 mayors, ?? local councillors, and ?? regional councillors
Party	Seats	+/–
Mayors
missing info		
Local councillors
missing info		
Regional councillors
Independent	120	+3
Green	8	+4
Labour	2	−3
Te Pāti Māori	1	+1
This lists parties that won seats. See the complete results below.

The 2022 New Zealand local elections (Māori: Nga Pōtitanga ā-Rohe 2022) were triennial elections that was held from 16 September until 8 October to elect local mayors and councillors, regional councillors, and members of various other local government bodies.

All 11 of New Zealand's regions and 66 of New Zealand's 67 cities and districts participated in the elections; Tauranga City Council was under crown commission and did not hold elections.

== Key dates ==
Key dates relating to the local elections were as follows:

30 June	Electoral Commission enrolment campaign starts.
First week of July	Enrolment update packs sent by Electoral Commission to electors.
12 August	Enrolment closes for the printed electoral roll.
16–21 September	Voting documents sent to all enrolled voters by local councils.
4 October	Last day to post ballot to ensure delivery.
7 October	Last day to enrol to vote.
8 October	Polling day — The voting documents must be at the council before voting closes at midday/12:00pm. Preliminary results to be released as soon as readily available afterwards.

== Campaign ==
=== Low candidate numbers ===
In early August 2022, Local Government New Zealand (LGNZ) and several local councils (Note: Including: Central Otago District Council, Greater Wellington Regional Council, Hastings District Council, Mackenzie District Council, Nelson City Council, Otago Regional Council, Environment Southland, Queenstown Lakes District Council, Rangitikei District Council, South Waikato District Council, and Rotorua Lakes Council) expressed concern about the low number of candidates standing for wards, council seats, and mayoral offices. For example, the Mackenzie District Council reported only three nominations for a total of 19 vacancies.

LGNZ President Stuart Crosby attributed the low number of candidates to several factors including abusive rhetoric directed against electoral officials on issues such as the Three Waters reform programme and resource management reform, and low remuneration rates which disadvantaged candidates from young and diverse communities in rural and provincial areas. Local government consultant Peter McKinlay identified central government pressure on local councils, compliance requirements, and changes to governing arrangements since the 1980s as factors discouraging people from standing for local government positions.

=== Entryism ===
In mid–August 2022, Stuff and the Guardian Australia reported that the anti-vaccination group Voices for Freedom (VFF) had encouraged its members to contest the 2022 local elections with the intention of infiltrating local government bodies in order to make New Zealand "ungovernable" at the local government level. VFF candidates were instructed to conceal their affiliation with the group when running as candidates. Victoria University of Wellington political scientist Dr Mona Krewel expressed concern that VFF candidates could be elected due to the low number of candidates and possible low voter turnout.

Notable VFF-affiliated candidates have included Teviot Valley Community Board candidate Gill Booth, Southland dairy farmer Jaspreet Bopara, Dunedin coordinators Watson and Tracey Pita, Christchurch City Council candidates Sally Cogle and Mike Wilson, VFF head of national operations and New Plymouth District Council candidate Tane Webster, Nelson City Council candidate Zoe Byrne, Whangārei District Council candidate Tracy Thomasson, and Tasman District Council candidate James Wolfen Duvall.

In early September 2022, Local Government NZ launched a campaign to help voters identify conspiracy theorists and extremists running for local government positions. Anti-misinformation group FACT Aotearoa had identified 170 candidates with extremist views or who were associated with anti-vaccination or anti-government groups. Massey University's Centre for Defence and Security Studies director Dr William Hoverd attributed the surge in "extremist" candidates to the occupation of the New Zealand Parliament's grounds during the 2022 Wellington protest, which in his view "had unified and galvanised groups with little in common other than their dissatisfaction with the Government."

== Results ==
=== Overall summary ===
Council control
Party/Ticket	Incumbent		Won			
Party/Ticket	Regional	Local	Regional		Local	
No majority	11	66	11	0	66	0

Individuals elected
Party/Ticket		Incumbents			Candidates			Elected					
Party/Ticket		R	L	M	R	L	M	R		L		M	
Local tickets
Far North	SOVEREIGN.nz	0	0	0	1	7	1	0	0	0	0	0	0
Auckland	Communities & Residents	0	3	0	0	8	0	0	0	2	▼1	0	0
Auckland	Putting People First	0	2	0	0	2	0	0	0	2	0	0	0
Auckland	City Vision	0	2	0	0	3	0	0	0	1	▼1	0	0
Auckland	Manurewa-Papakura Action Team	0	2	0	0	2	0	0	0	1	▼1	0	0
Auckland	WestWards	0	0	0	0	2	0	0	0	1	▲1	0	0
Auckland	Team Franklin	0	0	0	0		0	0	0	1	▲1	0	0
Auckland	#Burns&Young	0	0	0	0	2	0	0	0	0	0	0	0
Auckland	Your Community Future	0	0	0	0	2	0	0	0	0	0	0	0
Auckland	Independent Locals	0	0	0	0	1	0	0	0	0	0	0	0
Auckland	Rodney First	0	0	0	0	1	0	0	0	0	0	0	0
Hamilton	Team Integrity	0	0	0	0	4	0	0	0	1	▲1	0	0
Rotorua	RDR&R (Note: Rotorua District Residents and Ratepayers)	0	2	0	1	4	1	0	0	1	▼1	0	0
Taupō	Love Turangi	0	2	0	0	0	0	0	0	0	▼2	0	0
Napier	WTfO/T (Note: Working Together for Onekawa/Tamatea)	0	0	0	0	2	0	0	0	2	▲2	0	0
Palmerston North	Rangitāne o Manawatū	0	0	0	0	2	0	0	0	2	▲2	0	0
Porirua	Housing Action Porirua	0	1	0	0	0	0	0	0	0	0	0	0
Lower Hutt	United Hutt	0	0	0	0	12	0	0	0	2	▲2	0	0
Wellington	Together for Wellington	0	0	0	0	2	0	0	0	0	0	0	0
Nelson	Nelson Citizens Alliance	0	0	0	0	8	1	0	0	1	▲1	0	0
Nelson	Work 4 U	0	0	0	0	2	0	0	0	0	0	0	0
Christchurch	People's Choice (Note: Excludes candidates that also jointly ran as Labour candidates, they are included in the Labour total.)	1	3	0	3	3	0	3	▲2	3	0	0	0
Christchurch	Independent Citizens	0	3	0	0	4	0	0	0	2	▼1	0	0
Dunedin	Team Dunedin	0	0	0	0	7	1	0	0	3	▲3	1	▲1
Clutha	CR&RA (Note: Clutha Residents and Ratepayers Association)	0	0	0	0	2	0	0	0	1	▲1	0	0
Gore	Team Hokonui	0	0	0	0	3	1	0	0	2	▲2	1	▲1
Invercargill	LETS GO Invercargill	0	0	0	0	10	1	0	0	4	▲4	1	▲1
Invercargill	IRAG (Note: Invercargill Ratepayers Advocacy Group)	0	1	0	0	0	0	0	0	0	0	0	0
National parties and tickets
	Green (Note: Includes independent candidates endorsed by the Greens.)	3	8	1	10	13	2	7	▲4	10	▲2	1 (Note: Tory Whanau was endorsed by Greens and is included here but ran as an independent in 2022.)	0
	Labour (Note: Includes candidates that ran under a joint People's Choice – Labour ticket in Christchurch.)	8	21	2 (Note: Phil Goff was endorsed by Labour and is included here but ran as an independent in 2019. He did not seek re-election in 2022.)	4	26	2	2	▼6	17	▼3	1	▼1
	Labour & Green	0	0	0	0	0	1	0	0	0	0	0	0
	Te Pāti Māori	0	0	0	1	4	0	1	▲1	4	▲4	0	0
	Animal Justice	0	0	0	0	0	1	0	0	0	0	0	0
	Money Free Party	0	0	0	0	0	1	0	0	0	0	0	0
	New Conservatives	0	0	0	0	0	1	0	0	0	0	0	0
	The Opportunities Party	0	0	0	0	3	0	0	0	0	0	0	0
	Outdoors & Freedom	0	0	0	0	2	2	0	0	0	0	0	0
	Rock the Vote	0	0	0	0	1	0	0	0	0	0	0	0
	Refreshing Local Democracy	0	0	0	0	6	0	0	0	0	0	0	0
Other
	Independents (Note: Includes those that ran as an independent, those that had slogans on the ballot, and those that had no affiliation listed.)	117	652	63	257	1,440	271	118	▲4	642	▼14	61	▼2
	vacant	0	1	0	n/a			1	▲1	2	▲2	0	0

=== Regional councils ===
The regional level of government in New Zealand is organised into areas controlled by regional councils.

Council	Electoral System	Seats	Councillors		Turnout	Details	Sources
Council	Electoral System	Seats	Previous	Result	Turnout	Details	Sources
Northland	FPP	9	9 Independents	8 Independents; 1 Independent Green	49,181 (42.5%)	Details	
Waikato	FPP	14	14 Independents	14 Independents	103,420 (38.7%)	Details	
Bay of Plenty	FPP	14	14 Independents	12 Independents; 1 Te Pāti Māori; 1 Independent Green	77,924 (36.6%)	Details	
Hawke's Bay	FPP	11	9 Independents	11 Independents	34,137 (39.2%)	Details	
Taranaki	FPP	11	11 Independents	11 Independents	35,564 (44.5%)	Details	
Horizons (Manawatū-Whanganui)	FPP	14	11 Independents; 1 Independent Green	14 Independents; 1 Independent Green	66,541 (43.5%)	Details	
Greater Wellington	STV	13	9 Independents; 2 Green; 1 The Wellington Party; 1 Labour	9 Independents; 3 Green; 1 Labour	154,290 (43.4%)	Details	
West Coast	FPP	7	7 Independents	7 Independents	12,601 (52.2%)	Details	
Canterbury	FPP	14 (Note: of 16, two councillors representing Ngāi Tahu are appointed rather than elected.)	10 Independents; 3 People's Choice – Labour; 1 People's Choice	12 Independents; 1 People's Choice – Labour; 1 People's Choice	202,264 (45.4%)	Details	
Otago	FPP	12	11 Independents; 1 Labour	11 Independents; 1 Green Ōtepoti	75,251 (48.8%)	Details	
Southland	FPP	12	12 Independents	12 Independents	33,232 (51.9%)	Details	
All 11 councils		131					

=== Territorial authorities ===
The city and district level of government in New Zealand is organised into areas controlled by territorial authorities. Some of these also have the powers of regional governments and are known as unitary authorities. The Chatham Islands have their own specially legislated form of government.

No elections were held for the Tauranga City Council during the 2022 local elections due to the council being under a Crown commission. Elections for Tauranga City Council were instead held in 2024.

Council	Electoral System	Seats	Councillors		Turnout	Details	Sources
Council	Electoral System	Seats	Previous	Result	Turnout	Details	Sources
Far North	STV	10	10 Independents	10 Independents	19,619 (41.5%)	Details	
Whangārei	FPP	13	13 Independents	12 Independents; 1 Te Pāti Māori	28,942 (40.1%)	Details	
Kaipara	STV	9	9 Independents	9 Independents	8,366 (47.6%)	Details	
Auckland	FPP	20	7 Independents; 4 Labour; 3 Communities & Residents; 2 City Vision; 2 Putting People First; 2 Manurewa-Papakura Action Team	7 Independents; 5 Labour; 2 Communities & Residents; 2 Putting People First; 1 City Vision; 1 Team Franklin; 1 WestWards; 1 Manurewa-Papakura Action Team	404,541 (35.2%)	Details	
Hauraki	FPP	13	13 Independents	13 Independents	6,218 (40.6%)	Details	
Thames-Coromandel	FPP	9	8 Independents	9 Independents	12,138 (52.1%)	Details	
Waikato	FPP	13	11 Independents	13 Independents	16,359 (32.2%)	Details	
Matamata-Piako	FPP	12	11 Independents	12 Independents	9,984 (43.4%)	Details	
Hamilton	STV	14	13 Independents	12 Independents; 1 Team Integrity; 1 Independent Green	32,357 (29.4%)	Details	
Waipā	FPP	11	9 Independents	11 Independents	15,995 (40.4%)	Details	
Ōtorohanga	FPP	7	7 Independents	7 Independents	2,329 (46.9%)	Details	
South Waikato	FPP	10	9 Independents	10 Independents	6,389 (43.9%)	Details	
Waitomo	FPP	6	6 Independents	6 Independents	2,667 (44.0%)	Details	
Taupō	FPP	12	9 Independents; 2 Love Turangi	12 Independents	10,701 (52.5%)	Details	
Western Bay of Plenty	FPP	11	11 Independents	11 Independents	14,760 (37.6%)	Details	
Rotorua Lakes	FPP	10	8 Independents; 2 RDR&R	9 Independents; 1 RDR&R	23,645 (47.9%)	Details	
Whakatāne	FPP	9	10 Independents	9 Independents	11,788 (45.0%)	Details	
Kawerau	FPP	8	8 Independents	8 Independents	2,160 (42.1%)	Details	
Ōpōtiki	FPP	6	6 Independents	6 Independents	3,498 (53.9%)	Details	
Gisborne	STV	13	13 Independents	13 Independents	14,738 (43.4%)	Details	
Wairoa	FPP	6	6 Independents	6 Independents	2,864 (51.5%)	Details	
Hastings	FPP	14	12 Independents; 1 Labour	13 Independents; 1 Te Pāti Māori	15,616 (33.7%)	Details	
Napier	FPP	12	12 Independents	10 Independents; 2 WTfO/T	18,451 (40.1%)	Details	
Central Hawke's Bay	FPP	8	8 Independents	8 Independents	2,392 (44.3%)	Details	
New Plymouth	STV	14	14 Unknown	14 Independents	27,564 (45.0%)	Details	
Stratford	FPP	10	10 Independents	10 Independents	1,067 (43.0%)	Details	
South Taranaki	FPP	12	12 Independents	10 Independents; 1 Te Pāti Māori; 1 vacant	655 (27.6%)	Details	
Ruapehu	STV	9	10 Independents	9 Independents	4,301 (50.9%)	Details	
Whanganui	FPP	12	12 Independents	12 Independents	15,960 (47.5%)	Details	
Rangitikei	FPP	11	11 Independents	11 Independents	3,807 (53.3%)	Details	
Manawatū	FPP	11	10 Independents	10 Independents; 1 Te Pāti Māori	10,056 (45.0%)	Details	
Palmerston North	STV	15	11 Independents; 2 Green; 2 Labour	10 Independents; 2 Green; 2 Rangitāne o Manawatū; 1 Labour	21,370 (38.6%)	Details	
Tararua	FPP	9	8 Independents	9 Independents	6,359 (49.2%)	Details	
Horowhenua	FPP	12	10 Independents	12 Independents	11,811 (46.1%)	Details	
Kāpiti Coast	STV	10	9 Independents; 1 Labour	10 Independents	19,718 (45.8%)	Details	
Porirua	STV	10	7 Independents; 2 Labour; 1 Housing Action Porirua	8 Independents; 2 Labour	15,640 (37.3%)	Details	
Upper Hutt	FPP	10	10 Independents	10 Independents	14,296 (43.9%)	Details	
Hutt (Lower Hutt)	FPP	12	11 Independents; 1 Labour	8 Independents; 2 United Hutt; 1 Labour; 1 Independent Green	32,001 (41.0%)	Details	
Wellington	STV	15	6 Independents; 4 Labour; 3 Green; 1 vacant	8 Independents; 4 Labour; 3 Green	73,067 (45.5%)	Details	
Masterton	FPP	8	10 Independents	8 Independents	9,619 (47.8%)	Details	
Carterton	FPP	8	8 Independents	8 Independents	4,624 (60.7%)	Details	
South Wairarapa	FPP	9	9 Independents	9 Independents	5,006 (55.5%)	Details	
Nelson	STV	12	11 Independents; 2 Independent Green; 1 Labour	11 Independents; 2 Independent Green; 1 Nelson Citizens Alliance	20,897 (53.2%)	Details	
Tasman	FPP	13	13 Independents	13 Independents	20,783 (50.0%)	Details	
Marlborough	STV	14	13 Independents	14 Independents	15,641 (44.1%)	Details	
Buller	FPP	10	10 Independents	10 Independents	3,828 (49.2%)	Details	
Grey	FPP	8	8 Independents	8 Independents	4,955 (49.3%)	Details	
Westland	FPP	8	8 Independents	8 Independents	3,838 (60.4%)	Details	
Kaikōura	FPP	7	7 Independents	7 Independents	1,918 (64.3%)	Details	
Hurunui	FPP	10	10 Independents	10 Independents	2,969 (49.4%)	Details	
Waimakariri	FPP	10	10 Independents	10 Independents	21,301 (45.3%)	Details	
Christchurch	FPP	16	6 Independents; 3 The People's Choice; 3 The People's Choice – Labour; 3 Independent Citizens; 1 Labour	8 Independents; 3 The People's Choice; 2 The People's Choice – Labour; 2 Independent Citizens; 1 Labour	120,210 (44.4%)	Details	
Selwyn	FPP	10	11 Independents	10 Independents	20,836 (43.1%)	Details	
Ashburton	FPP	9	9 Independents	9 Independents	11,813 (51.1%)	Details	
Timaru	FPP	9	9 Independents	9 Independents	13,856 (50.5%)	Details	
Mackenzie	FPP	6	6 Independents	6 Independents	1,692 (56.4%)	Details	
Waimate	FPP	8	8 Independents	8 Independents	2,304 (60.3%)	Details	
Waitaki	FPP	10	10 Independents	10 Independents	7,766 (51.0%)	Details	
Central Otago	FPP	11	11 Independents	11 Independents	7,627 (48.1%)	Details	
Queenstown-Lakes	FPP	11	10 Independents	11 Independents	12,492 (44.5%)	Details	
Dunedin	STV	14	12 Independents; 1 Green Dunedin; 1 Labour	9 Independents; 3 Team Dunedin; 1 Green Ōtepoti; 1 Labour	48,133 (49.9%)	Details	
Clutha	FPP	14	14 Independents	13 Independents; 1 CR&RA	6,671 (53.1%)	Details	
Southland	FPP	12	12 Independents	12 Independents	8,409 (49.7%)	Details	
Gore	FPP	11	11 Independents	9 Independents; 2 Team Hokonui	4,859 (53.4%)	Details	
Invercargill	FPP	12	11 Independents; 1 IRAG	8 Independents; 4 LETS GO Invercargill	20,907 (53.2%)	Details	
Chatham Islands	FPP	8	8 Independents	8 Independents	uncontested	Details	
66 councils		706					

=== Mayors ===
All territorial authorities (including unitary authorities) directly elect mayors. Tauranga did not hold a mayoral election due to being under a Crown commission, instead holding an election in 2024.

Territorial authority	Incumbent	Elected	Runner-up	Details	Refs
Far North	John Carter (Ind)	Moko Tepania (Ind)	Ann Court (Ind)	Details	
Whangārei	Sheryl Mai (Ind)	Vince Cocurullo (Ind)	Mike Budd (Ind)		
Kaipara	Jason Smith (Ind)	Craig Jepson (Ind)	Karen Joyce-Paki (Ind)		
Auckland	Phil Goff (Note: Endorsed by Labour) (Ind)	Wayne Brown (Ind)	Efeso Collins (Note: Endorsed by Greens) (Ind)	Details	
Thames-Coromandel	Sandra Goudie (Ind)	Len Salt (Ind)	John Freer (Ind)		
Hauraki	Toby Adams (Ind)		unopposed		
Waikato	Allan Sanson (Ind)	Jacqui Church (Ind)	Aksel Bech (Ind)		
Matamata-Piako	Ash Turner (Ind)	Adrienne Wilcock (Ind)	Stu Husband (Ind)		
Hamilton	Paula Southgate (Ind)		Geoff Taylor (Ind)	Details	
Waipā	Jim Mylchreest (Ind)	Susan O'Regan (Ind)	Jim Mylchreest (Ind)		
Ōtorohanga	Max Baxter (Ind)		Kit Jeffries (Ind)		
South Waikato	Jenny Shattock (Ind)	Gary Petley (Ind)	Arama Ngapo (Ind)		
Waitomo	John Robertson (Ind)		Andy Connors (Ind)		
Taupō	David Trewavas (Ind)		Christine Rankin (Ind)		
Western Bay of Plenty	Garry Webber (Ind)	James Denyer (Ind)	Mark Boyle (Ind)		
Rotorua	Steve Chadwick (Ind)	Tania Tapsell (Ind)	Ben Sandford (Ind)	Details	
Whakatāne	Judy Turner (Ind)	Victor Luca (Ind)	Nándor Tánczos (Ind)		
Kawerau	Malcolm Campbell (Ind)	Faylene Tunui (Ind)	unopposed		
Ōpōtiki	Lyn Riesterer (Ind)	David Moore (Ind)	Louis Rapihana (Ind)		
Gisborne	Rehette Stoltz (Ind)		Colin Alder (Ind)		
Wairoa	Craig Little (Ind)		Benita Cairns (Ind)		
Hastings	Sandra Hazlehurst (Ind)		unopposed		
Napier	Kirsten Wise (Ind)		Nigel Simpson (Ind)	Details	
Central Hawke's Bay	Alex Walker (Ind)		unopposed		
New Plymouth	Neil Holdom (Ind)		Murray Chong (Ind)		
Stratford	Neil Volzke (Ind)		unopposed		
South Taranaki	Phil Nixon (Ind)		Walter Charles Smith (Ind)		
Ruapehu	Don Cameron (Ind)	Weston Kirton (Ind)	Elijah Pue (Ind)		
Whanganui	Hamish McDouall (Ind)	Andrew Tripe (Ind)	Hamish McDouall (Ind)		
Rangitikei	Andy Watson (Ind)		Simon Loudon (Ind)		
Manawatū	Helen Worboys (Ind)		Shane Casey (Ind)		
Palmerston North	Grant Smith (Ind)		Glenn Mitchell (Ind)		
Tararua	Tracey Collis (Ind)		Sharon Wards (Ind)		
Horowhenua	Bernie Wanden (Ind)		Sam Jennings (Ind)		
Kāpiti Coast	K Gurunathan (Ind)	Janet Holborow (Ind)	Rob McCann (Ind)	Details	
Porirua	Anita Baker (Ind)		Tapu Elia (Ind)	Details	
Upper Hutt	Wayne Guppy (Ind)		Angela McLeod (Ind)	Details	
Lower Hutt	Campbell Barry (Ind)		Tony Stallinger (Ind)	Details	
Wellington	Andy Foster (Ind)	Tory Whanau (Ind)	Andy Foster (Ind)	Details	
Masterton	Lyn Patterson (Ind)	Gary Caffell (Ind)	Craig Bowyer (Ind)	Details	
Carterton	Greg Lang (Ind)	Ron Mark (Ind)	Greg Lang (Ind)	Details	
South Wairarapa	Alex Beijen (Ind)	Martin Connelly (Ind)	Alex Beijen (Ind)		
Tasman	Tim King (Ind)		Mike Harvey (Ind)		
Nelson	Rachel Reese (Ind)	Nick Smith (Ind)	Matt Lawrey (Ind)		
Marlborough, New Zealand	John Leggett (Ind)	Nadine Taylor (Ind)	Matt Flight (Ind)		
Buller	Jamie Cleine (Ind)		Patrick O'Dea (Ind)		
Grey	Tania Gibson (Ind)		Richard Osmaston (Ind)		
Westland	Bruce Smith (Ind)	Helen Lash (Ind)	Te Arohanui Cook (Ind)		
Kaikōura	Craig Mackle (Ind)		Kevin Heays (Ind)		
Hurunui	Marie Black (Ind)		unopposed		
Waimakariri	Dan Gordon (Ind)		Miles Stapylton-Smith (Ind)		
Christchurch	Lianne Dalziel (Ind)	Phil Mauger (Ind)	David Meates (Ind)	Details	
Selwyn	Sam Broughton (Ind)		Calvin Payne (Ind)		
Ashburton	Neil Brown (Ind)		Jeffrey-Robert Swindley (Ind)		
Timaru	Nigel Bowen (Ind)		Stu Piddington (Ind)		
Mackenzie	Graham Smith (Ind)	Anne Munro (Ind)	Robin McCarthy (Ind)		
Waimate	Craig Rowley (Ind)		Rick Stevens (Ind)		
Chatham Islands	Monique Croon (Ind)		Greg Horler (Ind)		
Waitaki	Gary Kircher (Ind)		Paul John Mutch (Ind)		
Central Otago	Tim Cadogan (Ind)		unopposed		
Queenstown-Lakes	Jim Boult (Ind)	Glyn Lewers (Ind)	Jon Mitchell (Ind)		
Dunedin	Aaron Hawkins (Ind)	Jules Radich (Ind)	Aaron Hawkins (Ind)	Details	
Clutha	Bryan Cadogan (Ind)		Bruce Graham (Ind)		
Southland	Gary Tong (Ind)	Rob Scott (Ind)	Geoffrey Young (Ind)		
Gore	Tracy Hicks (Ind)	Ben Bell (Ind)	Tracy Hicks (Ind)		
Invercargill	Tim Shadbolt (Ind)	Nobby Clark (Ind)	Toni Biddle (Ind)	Details	

=== Local boards ===
Elections were also held for the 21 local boards in Auckland.

=== Community boards ===
Elections were also held for 111 community boards, which have been set up by 40 of the territorial authorities under Part 4 of the Local Government Act 2002 to represent the interests of particular communities within those territories.

Community Board	Electoral System	Seats	Members		Turnout	Details	Sources
Community Board	Electoral System	Seats	Previous	Result	Turnout	Details	Sources
Far North District
Bay of Islands-Whangaroa	STV	7	4 Independents; 3 missing info	7 Independents			
Kaikohe-Hokianga	STV	6	4 Independents; 2 missing info	6 Independents			
Te Hiku	STV	6	5 Independents; 1 missing info	6 Independents			
Waikato District
Huntly	FPP	6	6 Independents	6 Independents			
Ngāruawāhia	FPP	6	? missing info	6 Independents			
Raglan	FPP	6	6 Independents	6 Independents			
Rural/Port Waikato	FPP	4	? missing info	4 Independents			
Taupiri	FPP	4	6 Independents	4 Independents			
Tuakau	FPP	6	6 Independents	4 vacant; 2 Independents			
Thames-Coromandel District
Coromandel-Colville	FPP	4	4 missing info	4 Independents			
Mercury Bay	FPP	4	4 missing info	4 Independents			
Tairua-Pāuanui	FPP	4	4 missing info	4 Independents			
Thames	FPP	4	4 missing info	4 Independents			
Whangamatā	FPP	4	4 missing info	4 Independents			
Waipā District
Cambridge	FPP	5	5 Independents; 1 missing info	5 Independents			
Te Awamutu-Kihikihi	FPP	5	4 Independents; 1 missing info	5 Independents			
Ōtōrohanga District
Ōtorohanga	FPP	4	4 Independents	4 Independents			
Kāwhia	FPP	4	4 Independents	4 Independents			
South Waikato District
Tīrau	FPP	4	4 Independents	4 Independents			
Western Bay of Plenty District
Katikati	FPP	4	4 Independents	4 Independents			
Maketu	FPP	4	4 Independents	4 Independents			
Ōmokoroa	FPP	4	4 Independents	4 Independents			
Te Puke	FPP	4	4 Independents	4 Independents			
Waihi Beach	FPP	4	new	4 Independents			
Rotorua Lakes District
Rotorua Lakes	FPP	4	4 Independents	4 Independents			
Rotorua Lakes Rural	FPP	4	4 Independents	4 Independents			
Whakatāne District
Murupara	FPP	6	3 Independents; 1 vacant; 1 missing info	6 Independents			
Rangitāiki	FPP	6	6 Independents	6 Independents			
Tāneatua	FPP	6	6 Independents	6 Independents			
Whakatāne-Ōhope	FPP	6	8 Independents	6 Independents			
Ōpōtiki District
Ōpōtiki Coast	FPP	4	4 missing info	4 Independents			
Hastings District
Hastings Rural	FPP	4	2 Independents; 2 missing info	4 Independents			
New Plymouth District
Clifton	STV	4	4 missing info	4 Independents			
Inglewood	STV	4	2 vacant; 2 missing info	4 Independents			
Kaitake	STV	4	4 missing info	4 Independents			
Puketapu-Bell Block	STV	4	new	4 Independents			
Waitara	STV	4	4 missing info	4 Independents			
South Taranaki District
Eltham-Kaponga	FPP	4	4 Independents	4 Independents			
Pātea	FPP	4	? missing info	4 Independents			
Taranaki Coastal	FPP	4	4 Independents	4 Independents			
Te Hāwera	FPP	4	4 Independents	4 Independents			
Whanganui District
Whanganui Rural	FPP	7	6 Independents; 1 vacant	7 Independents		Details	
Ruapehu District
Taumarunui-Ōhura	STV	5	new	5 Independents			
Waimarino-Waiouru	STV	5	new	5 Independents			
Ōwhango-National Park	STV	4	4 missing info	4 Independents			
Rangitīkei District
Rātana	FPP	4	4 Independents	4 Independents			
Taihape	FPP	4	? missing info	4 Independents			
Tararua District
Dannevirke	FPP	4	4 Independents	4 Independents			
Eketahuna	FPP	4	4 Independents	4 Independents			
Horowhenua District
Te Awahou Foxton	STV	5	5 Independents	5 Independents			
Kāpiti Coast District
Otaki	STV	4	4 Independents	4 Independents		Details	
Paekākāriki	STV	4	4 Independents	4 Independents		Details	
Paraparaumu	STV	4	new	4 Independents		Details	
Raumati	STV	4	new	4 Independents		Details	
Waikanae	STV	4	4 Independents	4 Independents		Details	
Hutt City
Eastbourne	FPP	5	5 Independents	5 Independents		Details	
Petone	FPP	6	6 Independents	6 Independents		Details	
Wainuiomata	FPP	6	6 Independents	6 Independents		Details	
Wellington City
Mākara-Ōhāriu	STV	6	? missing info	6 Independents		Details	
Tawa	STV	6	5 Independents; 1 Green	6 Independents		Details	
South Wairarapa District
Greytown	FPP	4	? missing info	4 Independents			
Featherston	FPP	4	? missing info	3 Independents; 1 The Opportunities Party			
Martinborough	FPP	4	? missing info	4 Independents			
Tasman District
Golden Bay	FPP	4	? missing info	4 Independents		Details	
Motueka	FPP	4	? missing info	4 Independents		Details	
Buller District
Inangahua	FPP	4	4 Independents	4 Independents			
Hurunui District
Hanmer Springs	FPP	5	5 Independents	5 Independents			
Wainakariri District
Woodend-Sefton	FPP	5	5 Independents	5 Independents			
Kaiapoi-Tuahiwi	FPP	5	5 Independents	5 Independents			
Oxford-Ohoka	FPP	6	6 Independents	6 Independents			
Rangiora-Ashley	FPP	8	8 Independents	8 Independents			
Christchurch City
Te Pātaka o Rākaihautū; Banks Peninsula	FPP	7	? missing info	4 Independents; 3 People's Choice		Details	
Waitai; Coastal-Burwood-Linwood	FPP	6	? missing info	3 People's Choice – Labour; 2 Independents; 1 Labour		Details	
Waimāero; Fendalton-Waimairi-Harewood	FPP	6	? missing info	5 Independent Citizens; 1 Avonhead Community Group		Details	
Waipuna; Halswell-Hornby-Riccarton	FPP	6	? missing info	3 People's Choice; 2 Independents; 1 Independent Citizens		Details	
Waipapa; Papanui-Innes-Central	FPP	6	? missing info	3 Independents; 2 Labour; 1 People's Choice		Details	
Waihoro; Spreydon-Cashmere-Heathcote	FPP	6	? missing info	4 People's Choice – Labour; 2 Independents		Details	
Selwyn District
Malvern	FPP	5	? missing	5 Independents			
Ashburton District
Methven	FPP	5	? missing info	5 Independents			
Timaru District
Pleasant Point	FPP	5	5 missing info	5 Independents			
Temuka	FPP	5	5 missing info	5 Independents			
Geraldine	FPP	6	6 missing info	6 Independents			
Mackenzie District
Twizel	FPP	4	4 missing info	4 Independents			
Fairlie	FPP	4	4 missing info	4 Independents			
Tekapo	FPP	4	4 missing info	4 Independents			
Waitaki District
Ahuriri	FPP	5	? missing info	3 vacant; 2 Independent			
Waihemo	FPP	5	5 missing info	5 Independents			
Queenstown-Lakes District
Wānaka-Upper Clutha	FPP	4	? missing info	4 Independents		Details	
Central Otago District
Cromwell	FPP	4	? missing info	4 Independents			
Maniototo	FPP	4	4 Independents	4 Independents			
Vincent	FPP	4	4 Independents	4 Independents			
Teviot Valley	FPP	4	4 Independents	4 Independents			
Dunedin City
Strath Taieri	STV	6	? missing info	6 Independents		Details	
Waikouaiti Coast	STV	6	6 Independents	6 Independents		Details	
Mosgiel-Taieri	STV	6	6 Independents	6 Independents		Details	
Saddle Hill	STV	6	6 Independents	6 Independents		Details	
West Harbour	STV	6	? missing info	6 Independents		Details	
Otago Peninsula	STV	6	6 Independents	6 Independents		Details	
Clutha District
Lawrence-Tuapeka	FPP	6	? missing info	6 Independents			
West Otago	FPP	6	? missing info	6 Independents			
Gore District
Mataura	FPP	5	? missing info	5 Independents			
Southland District
Wallace Takitimu	FPP	6	? missing info	6 Independents			
Oraka Aparima	FPP	6	? missing info	6 Independents			
Waihopai Toetoe	FPP	7	? missing info	7 Independents			
Stewart Island/Rakiura	FPP	6	? missing info	5 Independents; 1 vacant			
Fiordland	FPP	6	? missing info	6 Independents			
Tuatapere Te Waewae	FPP	6	? missing info	6 Independents			
Ardlussa	FPP	6	? missing info	5 Independents; 1 vacant			
Northern	FPP	6	? missing info	5 Independents; 1 vacant			
Oreti	FPP	7	? missing info	7 Independents			
Invercargill District
Bluff	FPP	5	? missing info	5 Independents			
111 community boards		553					

=== Licensing trusts ===
Elections were also held for 14 licensing trusts, which are community-owned companies with government-authorised monopolies on the development of premises licensed for the sale of alcoholic beverages and associated accommodation in an area:

=== Referendums ===
Council	Referendum	Option	Vote	Details	Sources
Hutt (Lower Hutt)	Electoral system poll	First Past the Post (FPP)	19,812 (61.9%)	Details	
Hutt (Lower Hutt)	Electoral system poll	Single Transferable Vote (STV)	8,696 (27.2%)	Details	
All 1 referendum

== Aftermath ==
=== Regional chair elections ===
The chairpersons of the country's regional councils are not directly-elected; they are instead elected from amongst the members by said members.

Regional council	Incumbent chair	Elected chair	Vote		Date	Sources
Regional council	Incumbent chair	Elected chair	For	Against	Date	Sources
Northland	Penny Smith (Ind.)	Tui Shortland (Ind.)	unopposed		25 October 2022	
Waikato	Barry Quayle (Ind.)	Pamela Storey (Ind.)	7 (Note: Tie was decided by pulling name from hat.)	7	?	
Bay of Plenty	Doug Leeder (Ind.)		majority		19 October 2022	
Hawke's Bay						
Taranaki						
Horizons (Manawatū-Whanganui)						
Greater Wellington						
West Coast						
Canterbury						
Otago						
Southland						

== Analysis ==
=== Low voter turnout ===
The 2022 local elections reported a record low voter turnout across the country. By 28 September, Auckland had reported a voter turnout of 8.8%, 10.9% in Christchurch, 4.9% in Wellington, 3.9% in Taupō, and 19.8% in the Westland District. Low voter turnout was also reported in other urban centres and regions including Dunedin, Invercargill, Nelson, Rotorua, Queenstown, the Northland Region, South Canterbury, and the New Plymouth District. Auckland University of Technology political scientist Julienne Molineaux attributed the low voter turnout to public interest in the death of Queen Elizabeth II, the long weekend, a long voting period, and public disengagement with postal voting due to insufficient posting infrastructure. In response to low voter turnout, Auckland mayoral candidates Efeso Collins and Wayne Brown advocated scrapping the postal voter system in favour of online voting.

In late September 2022, Radio New Zealand and The Spinoff reported that several voters including Local Government Minister Nanaia Mahuta were experiencing delays in receiving their postal ballot papers. According to Radio New Zealand, most local councils hired private companies to manage their elections. One Northland electoral official advocated transferring management of local elections to the Electoral Commission, which manages the triennial general elections.

By 9 October, The New Zealand Herald reported that the national voter turnout for the 2022 local elections was a record low 36 percent. Voter turnout in local body elections had declined in New Zealand over the past 25 years since 1989, which recorded a national voter turnout of 57%. In response, Local Government New Zealand President Stuart Crosby, Prime Minister Jacinda Ardern, and National Party leader Christopher Luxon called for an independent review and urgent reform to the voting system for local elections.

On 28 October, the Future for Local Government group advocated several recommendations aimed at improving voter turnout at future local body elections including lowering the voting age to 16 years old, four-year terms, raising salaries for elected local officials, implementing the single transferable voting system nationwide, and improving engagement with the public particularly Māori voters.

=== Three Waters reform programme ===
Following the conclusion of the local elections in early October 2022, surveys conducted by the online media organisations Newsroom and The Spinoff found that a majority of elected mayors opposed the Government's Three Waters reform programme, a national water infrastructure programme that would take management of water assets and services away from local government bodies. While Newsroom's survey of 220 newly-elected mayors and councillors found that 76% of respondents of 220 newly-elected mayors and councillors surveyed opposed the Three Water reforms, the Spinoff found that 43 of the 66 elected mayors surveyed opposed the reforms. Several newly-elected mayors including Mayor of Auckland Wayne Brown, Mayor of Invercargill Nobby Clark and Mayor of Nelson Nick Smith had campaigned against Three Waters during their mayoral races.

=== Entryism ===
Following the release of preliminary local election results on 8 October, Stuff reported that fewer than twelve Voices of Freedom–affiliated candidates had been elected to local government positions. The VFF had fielded over 200 candidates who were contesting 159 races. Notable successful pro-VFF candidates have included Southland District Council member Jaspreet Bosparai, Teviot Community Board member Gill Booth, Deputy Mayor of Whanganui Jenny Duncan, Paraparaumu/Raumati Community board member Jonny Best, Waikato Regional Council member Clyde Graf, Selwyn District Council member Elizabeth Mundt, Hibiscus and Bays Local Board member Leanne Willis, Oraka Aparima community board member Emma Gould, and Taupo District Council member Duncan Campbell. In addition, several incumbent councillors who had expressed support for VFF's views including Carterton District Council member Jill Greathead and Gisborne District Council member Meredith Akuhata-Brown were defeated.
