= Mary Gertrude Joyce =

Irish nun and musician (1884–1964)

Sister Mary Gertrude Joyce

Personal life
- Born: Margaret Alice Joyce; 18 January 1884 41 Brighton Square West, Rathgar, Dublin, Ireland
- Died: 1 March 1964 (aged 80) Calvary Hospital, Christchurch, New Zealand

Religious life
- Religion: Roman Catholic
- Order: Sisters of Mercy

Sister Mary Gertrude Joyce (born Margaret Alice Joyce; 18 January 1884 – 1 March 1964) was an Irish Sisters of Mercy nun and musician.

== Early life and family ==
Sister Mary Gertrude Joyce was born Margaret Alice Joyce at 41 Brighton Square West, Rathgar, Dublin on 18 January 1884. She was the second eldest child of ten surviving children of John Stanislaus Joyce and Mary (née Murray). Through her grandmother, Ellen O'Connell Joyce, she was related to Daniel O'Connell. James Joyce, her older brother, was 18 months older. He called her "Poppie" due to a red cloak she wore to sodality meetings. It is said that she was his favourite sister. The Joyce family lived at 16 different addresses in Dublin and Bray owing to the differing fortunes of their father. Joyce was educated by Mrs Elizabeth Conway, a family governess, later attended St Catherine's Dominican Convent at Sion Hill and Dominican College, Eccles Street.

After the death of her mother on 13 August 1903, when Joyce was 19, she cared for her younger siblings. She had to beg her father for money for food and other necessities, caught between the promise she made to her mother and her father's demands. Joyce's difficulties in raising the younger children with her father was the basis of the "Eveline" story in Dubliners. Joyce was the first person that her brother James told that he was in love with Nora Barnacle. She tried to dissuade James and Nora from going to the continent. She took Nora shopping for some clothes before they left in 1904, and helped the couple with their travel arrangements. She also tried to get James to reconcile with their father.

== Career ==
Joyce entered the Convent of Mercy Missionary College, Callan, County Kilkenny on 20 August 1909. She originally intended to become a nun in Germany, but James suggested she go to New Zealand. She left for New Zealand on 10 November 1909. James was in Dublin at the time of her departure, and saw Joyce off from North Wall to England where she would sail to New Zealand. He promised her that if she ever wished to return he would send her the fare. She never returned to Ireland or saw any of her family again. On 30 December 1909 she entered the Convent of Mercy, Greymouth, New Zealand, receiving the habit on 13 July 1910. Taking the name Sister Mary Gertrude, she professed on 13 July 1912.

From 1912 to 1949, Joyce taught piano, violin and singing in Greymouth and Runanga. She left to teach the boys of Loreto College in Papanui, Christchurch, teaching until three weeks before her death at age 80. When she was told she was dying, she requested that her letters and photographs be destroyed which included 30 years of weekly letters from James and other members of the Joyce family. She had never read any of her brother's works, possibly until 1962, when Fr Godfrey Ainsworth gave her a copy of A Portrait of the Artist as a Young Man.

Joyce died in Calvary Hospital, Christchurch on 1 March 1964, and was buried in Waimairi cemetery, Christchurch.
