= St Bede's College, Christchurch =

Secondary school in Christchurch, New Zealand

St Bede's College
- Hato Peti
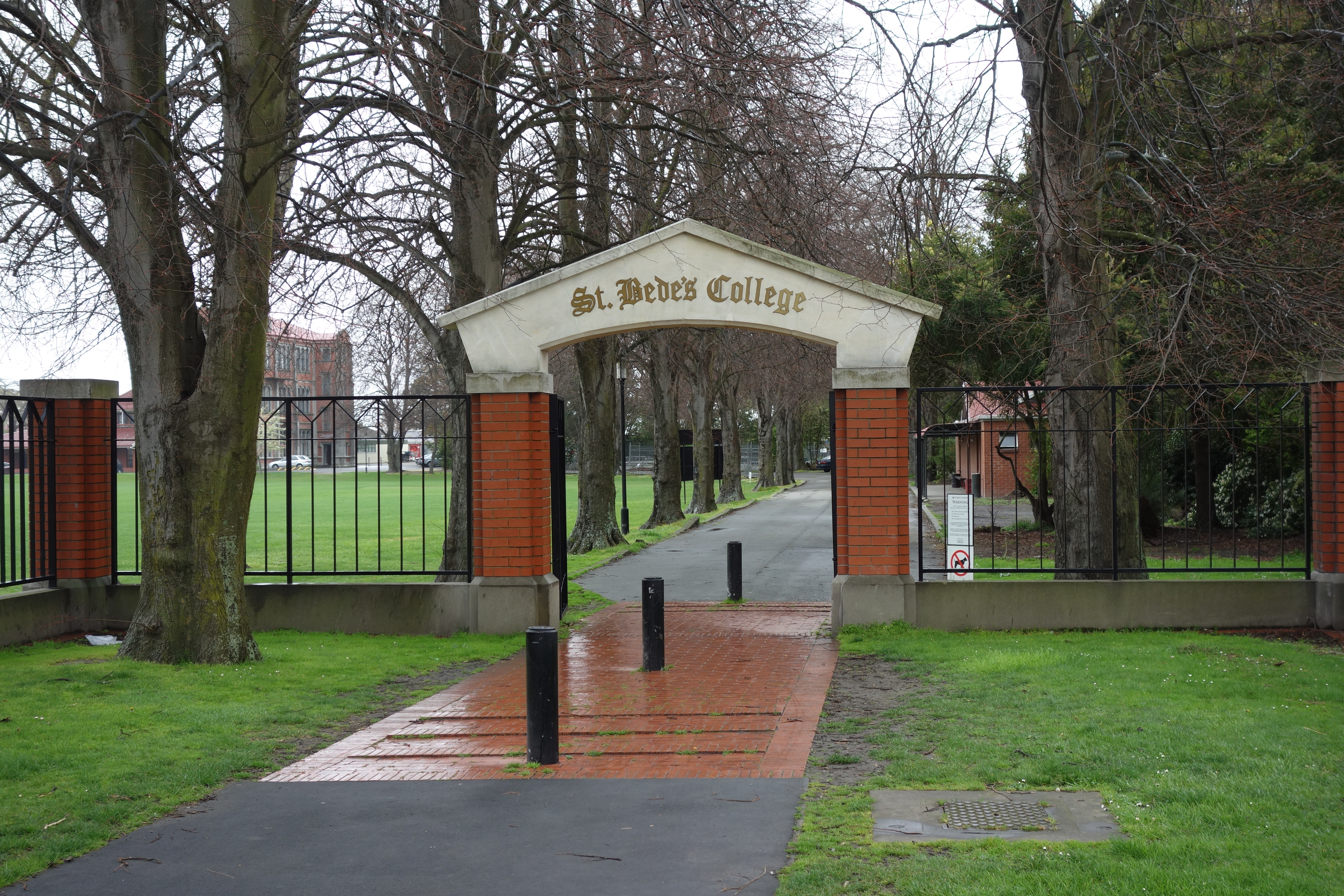
- Pedestrian and Cyclist entrance to the college on Main North Road

Location
- 210 Main North Road, Papanui, Christchurch, New Zealand; 43.483°S 172.62°E

Information
- Type: State-integrated Single Sex Boys College (Year 9–13) with Boarding Facilities
- Motto: Latin: Fide et Opere (By Faith and By Works)
- Religious affiliation: Catholic
- Patron saint: St Bede
- Established: 1911; 115 years ago
- Sister school: Marian College
- Ministry of Education Institution no.: 315
- Chairperson: Chris Mene
- Rector: Jon McDowall
- Gender: Male
- Enrolment: 802
- Area: 22 hectares (54 acres)
- Socio-economic decile: 9
- Yearbook: The Bedean
- Website: www.stbedes.school.nz

St. Bede's College is an integrated Roman Catholic day and boarding school in Christchurch, New Zealand, for boys aged 12 (Year 9) to 18 (Year 13). St. Bede's is the oldest Roman Catholic Boys' College in New Zealand's South Island. It is also the only Catholic day and boarding college for boys in New Zealand's South Island. Students at St Bede's are colloquially known as Bedeans. St Bede's College was founded in 1911 by the Marists, a religious congregation founded in Lyon, France, in 1816.

== History ==
=== Role of the Marists in New Zealand ===
Father (later Bishop) Jean Baptiste François Pompallier, first bishop of the Roman Catholic Church in New Zealand, was one of the thirteen founders of the Society of Mary (Marists).

The canonical approbation of the Society of Mary was given by Pope Gregory XVI in 1836. Fr Jean-Claude Colin had a close association with Pompallier who accompanied the French Marist Missionaries to New Zealand. The Society of Mary became involved in missionary work and teaching, work that was very similar to the missions of the Jesuits, but which had a distinctive Marian approach.

Before 1877, education in New Zealand was a provincial jurisdiction, with many schools being established by churches or private funding. With the Education Act 1877, the New Zealand Government centralised control through twelve regional education boards to introduce free, compulsory and secular education. Schools intending to teach religious instruction could not receive Government assistance. The Society of Mary continued to build the foundations for a Catholic System of Education, sourcing religious teachers from Ireland, Europe and Australia. In 1885, the Society of Mary established St. Patrick's College in Cambridge Terrace, Wellington. St. Patrick's College was the first Society of Mary secondary school for Boys in New Zealand.

=== Foundation of St. Bede's College ===
St Bede's College, Christchurch, was established in 1911 at the request of Bishop John Joseph Grimes S.M., and the first Catholic Bishop of Christchurch. The college bears the name of The Venerable Bede (AD 673–735) an English Benedictine monk, scholar, and saint. The Society owned St Bede's College. The school was originally located along Ferry Road, but it outgrew its facilities. The college had the option of purchasing the current site or that of St. Andrew's College, Christchurch in Merivale. The chapel was originally used as a gym, but with the building of Chanel Hall, it became obsolete and so was converted to a chapel. The chapel contains the Board of Honour, honouring Bedeans who fought and died for their country in both world wars. The chapel was demolished in 2011 after the Christchurch earthquakes.

=== College site ===
The college moved from Ferry Road in 1920 to its present site on 220,000 square metres of fields and trees at the northern entrance to the city. Most of the original buildings had to be demolished in 1981 due to new earthquake safety requirements. However, the chapel and half of Durham remained standing until the 2011 earthquake. Over the years, buildings have continued to be added to the college, including the Alistair Macdonald Centre for the Performing Arts, Jarrow (a senior boarding dorm) as well as a new gymnasium.

=== Effects from the Canterbury earthquakes ===
After the major 2011 Canterbury earthquake on 22 February, the school was undamaged, but was shut until 14 March for building inspections. Sister school Marian College in Shirley, Christchurch, was severely damaged. Marian College is an all-girls school, and it was decided to share facilities with St. Bedes. The boys from St. Bedes attended school using a "morning timetable" up until 13:00, with the girls continuing on in the afternoon and evening. The celebration of the 100th anniversary of St. Bedes College, due to take place at the end of May 2011, was also postponed as a result of the earthquake until a year later in May 2012. The Grimes boarding house was found unsafe due to quake damage resulting in the relocation of year ten and twelve students to the Durham boarding house. Grimes was demolished in early 2013 along with the Chapel of St Bede, previously the only original building on the site. The Chapel hall was demolished at the end of 2013; replaced with a green space known as 'The Knole'. A new chapel was completed in 2019

=== Abuse allegations ===
A former staff member was charged in late 2024 for sexual offences against boarders at the college about two decades earlier. The college cancelled planned celebrations for the centenary of boarding at the school in 2025 due to the allegations. In February 2025 it was revealed the allegations were against Father Rowan Donoghue, a Catholic priest who had overseen the boarding school during the mid-to-late 1990s. Fr Donoghue had admitted six charges, including indecent assault on a boy aged 12–16, indecent assault on a boy 16 and over, and sexual violation by unlawful sexual connection, for which he is awaiting sentencing. Further, in February 2026, three allegations were publicised against Father Brian Cummings, who also served as Rector of St Bede's College from 1990-2001, and as Deputy Rector at St Patrick's Silverstream College prior to that. Fr Cummings passed in 2022. The claims against Fr Cummings were made in 1996, 2014 and 2023.

== Philosophy and Marist Tradition ==
From its beginnings, St. Bede's College has taught its students by observing a tradition that combines Marian and apostolic elements. For the most part of the previous century, the college had residential Marist priests and brothers as teaching staff. There is still a significant Marist presence at the college.

The college's mission is "To help each boy develop fully by Faith and by Works."

== The house system ==
A house system was instituted at St. Bede's College, with every student allocated to a house. The house system has several functions, including administrative. Each house is named for a distinguished person associated with the college and its name. They compete against each other in annual competitions such as: swimming, athletics, and haka. There are five houses. These are:

- Benedict, gold house, named for St. Benedict, Founder of the Benedictine Order at Monte Cassino of which Bede was a member.
- Colin, light blue house, named for The Venerable Jean-Claude Colin, S.M. was a French priest, founder of the Society of Mary in Lyon, France.
- McCarthy, green house, named for Major, Rt. Hon. Sir Thaddeus McCarthy, Alumnus, Jurist and the college's first Knight.
- Mannix, dark blue house, named for Fr. John Mannix, SM, Seventh Rector of the college and first Old Boy to become Rector.
- Redwood, maroon house (often uses Red), named for Francis M. Redwood, SM, Archbishop of Wellington, who successfully sourced teaching religious institutes from France, Ireland, and Australia, after the passage of the Education Act, 1877. He also served on the Senate of the University of New Zealand for more than 25 years.

The Head Teachers of each house
House Leaders	
Benedict	Miss Whelan
Colin	Mr Sullivan
McCarthy	Mr Struthers
Mannix	Mr Poulter
Redwood	Mr Rawson

== Boarding houses ==
The boarding houses are for boarding pupils and are located on the college grounds. These are:

- Grimes, named for John Joseph Grimes, SM, the first Roman Catholic Bishop of Christchurch (1888). Bishop Grimes oversaw the completion of construction in 1905 of the Cathedral of the Blessed Sacrament, designed by Francis Petre. The Grimes building sustained damage in the Canterbury earthquake, and was therefore demolished.
- Jarrow, named for the English town of Jarrow, on the River Tyne, and the Monastery where St. Bede spent most of his life.
- Durham, named for Durham Cathedral, England, where the remains of St. Bede were entombed after being taken from Jarrow circa 1020.
- Wearmouth, The Wearmouth boarding wing for Year 13 boarders was opened during the first week in August 2010. This wonderful facility was designed by architect Duval O’Neill and built by Matthew Bushnell.

== Rectors ==
- Justin Boyle (2001–2022)
- Jon McDowell (2023–present)

== Notable alumni ==
St. Bede's College alumni (referred to as Old Boys) are notably represented in the New Zealand Parliament in the House of Representatives. They accounted for the greatest number of alumni of any New Zealand College to sit in the Legislature of New Zealand's 47th, 48th, 49th, 50th and 51st New Zealand Parliaments.

The following old boys are members of the 54th New Zealand Parliament;

- Damien O'Connor (born 1958), in Parliament since 1993 (with a gap of a few months) representing the Labour Party; Cabinet Minister (2005–2008); Minister of Agriculture and several other portfolios (2017–2023)
- Gerry Brownlee (born 1956), National Party MP since 1996. Brownlee was a technology teacher at the college; former cabinet minister, Speaker of the New Zealand House of Representatives (2023–present), Father of the House (2022–present)
- Matt Doocey (born 1972) National Party MP since 2014. In Parliament since 2014; Cabinet Minister (2023–present); Minister for Mental Health, Minister for ACC and several other portfolios (2023–present).

Other distinguished Old Bedeans include:

- Kevin Barry (born 1959), Olympic silver medallist, trainer for Joseph Parker and previously David Tua.
- Mark Blumsky (born 1957), Mayor of Wellington (1995–2001); National Party MP (2005–2008); High Commissioner to Niue (2010–2014).
- David Carter (born 1952), National Party MP (1994–2020); former cabinet Minister; Speaker of the New Zealand House of Representatives (2013–2017).
- Clayton Cosgrove (born 1969), Labour Party MP 1999–2017; Cabinet minister (2005–2008).
- Elliot Dixon (born 1989), professional rugby union player; All Black
- Peter Dunne (born 1954), MP 1984–2017; represented various parties including the Labour Party and the United Future party; long-serving minister in both National and Labour-led administrations (1990, 1996, 2005–2017); Father of the House (2011–2017)
- Matt Henry (born 1991), professional cricketer; Blackcap
- Gerald Hensley (born 1935), Diplomat and public servant
- Owen Leeming (born 1930), poet
- Michael Leitch (born 1988), Captain of Japan national rugby union team
- David Lindstrom (born 1948), Olympic rower
- Peter Mahon, High Court judge
- Thaddeus McCarthy, ONZ, KBE (1907–2001), former President of the Court of Appeal of New Zealand.
- Kevin Meates (1930–2022), All Black
- Josh Navidi (born 1990), Welsh International rugby player; member of the Wales national rugby union team
- Frederick Vaka'uta Sevele (born 1944), Prime Minister of Tonga (2006 -2010)
- Luke Thompson (born 1981) Japan Rugby union national team player.
- Anote Tong (born 1952), 4th president of Kiribati (2003 - 2016)
- Gerard Wall 1920 – 1992), Knight Bachelor (1992); surgeon; Labour Party MP (1969–1987); Speaker of the New Zealand House of Representatives (1985–1987).
- Tanner Stowers-Smith (born 2004), New Zealand Warriors Rugby League Player

Four Bishops of Christchurch (Brian Ashby, Basil Meeking, John Cunneen and Barry Jones), John Adams (born 1963), third bishop of Palmerston North and more than 180 priests attended St Bede's.

== Associations ==
St. Bede's retains a tradition of academic, cultural and sporting fixtures with St. Patrick's College, Wellington and St. Patrick's College, Silverstream. St Bede's played St Pat's Town in rugby from the 1920s until the early 1970s when it was dropped due to financial reasons. This was for the Holley Shield and the series between the two colleges stood at St Bede's 24, St Pat's Town 20, with one draw. The game against Silverstream had not been played since the Second World War until it was revived in the 1990s. Today, all three Colleges are part of the legacy of the Society of Mary in New Zealand.
