= Pyes Pa =

Suburb of Tauranga, New Zealand

- Suburb
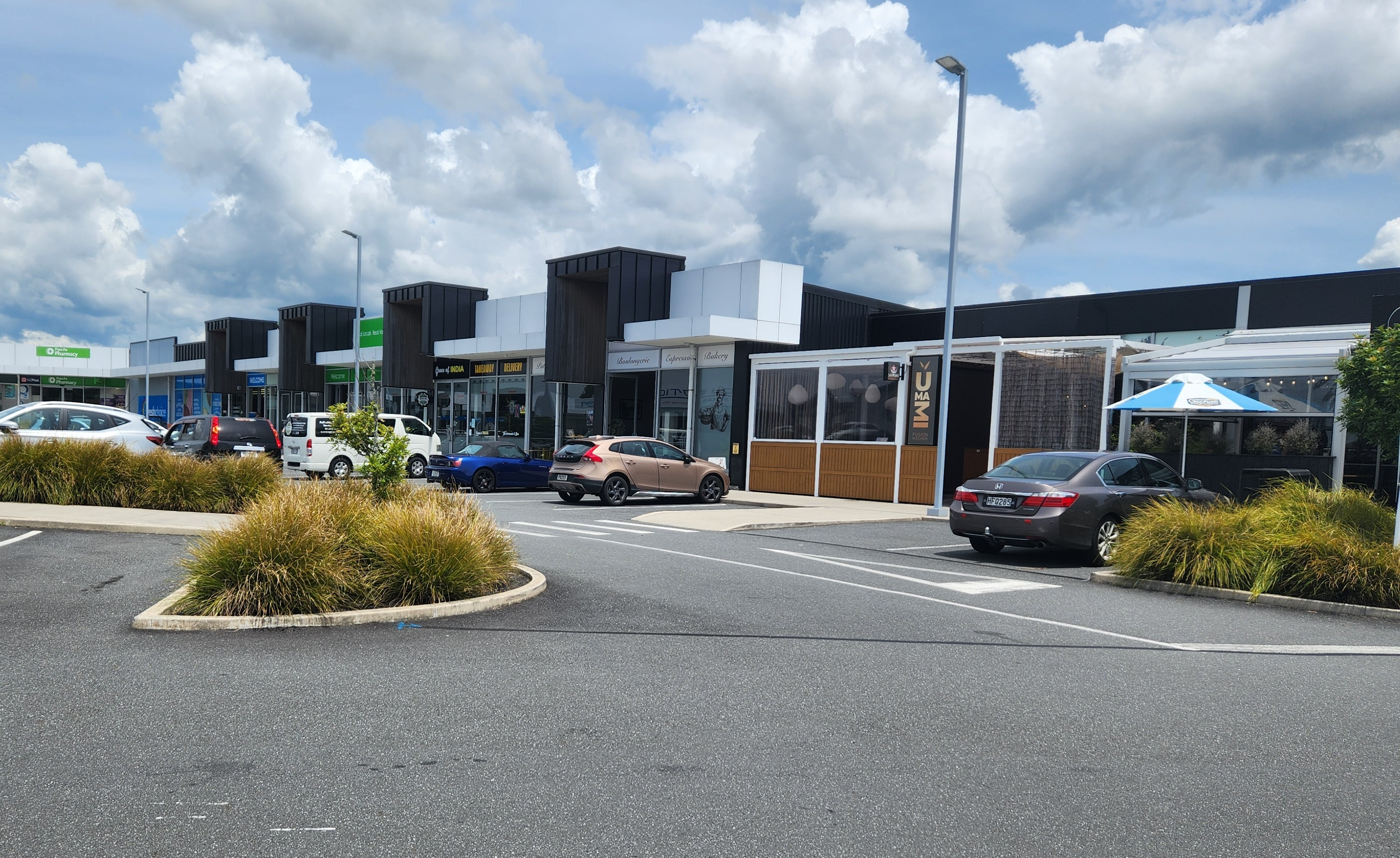
- Pyes Pa shopping centre in 2026
- Interactive map of Pyes Pa
- Coordinates: 37.748°S 176.122°E
- Country: New Zealand
- City: Tauranga
- Local authority: Tauranga City Council
- Electoral ward: Tauriko General Ward

Area
  - Land: 1,346 ha (3,330 acres)

Population (June 2025)
  - Total: 15,350
  - Density: 1,140/km^{2} (2,954/sq mi)

Bethlehem	Greerton	Poike
Tauriko	Pyes Pa	Ohauiti
Kopurererua	Oropi	Kaitemako

Pyes Pa is a suburb of Tauranga, New Zealand.

The suburb is located in the southern part of Tauranga about 40.3 km from Rotorua. It includes The Lakes, Cheyne Road and the TECT All Terrain Park. It is named for Captain Charles Pye (1820 - 1876), who was in the Colonial Defence Force cavalry during the New Zealand Wars.

== History ==
The New Zealand Wars battle site of Te Ranga is located in a paddock on Pyes Pa Road (SH36) near the corner of Joyce Road, about 10 km south of Tauranga. On 21 June 1864, British forces decisively defeated local Māori there.

The British defeat at Pukehinahina (Gate Pā) on 29 April 1864 had shocked New Zealand's European settlers.

Lieutenant-General Duncan Cameron returned to Auckland, leaving Lieutenant-Colonel Henry Greer in command of the British garrison on the Te Papa peninsula. Greer was ordered to attack immediately should Māori forces begin constructing another pā in the district.

On the morning of 21 June, Greer left Camp Te Papa (now the Tauranga CBD) with a force of 600 men. Five kilometres inland from Gate Pā, the British force discovered 500 to 600 Maori working on defensive earthworks at Te Ranga. Led by Rāwiri Puhirake, they comprised Ngāi Te Rangi and Ngāti Ranginui, supported by Ngāti Porou from the east coast and Ngāti Pikiao and Ngāti Rangiwewehi from Rotorua. Early that afternoon, following the arrival of reinforcements, Greer ordered men from the 68th and 43rd regiments and 1st Waikato Militia to advance.

The battle that followed was described as among the bloodiest of the New Zealand campaigns. In desperate hand-to-hand fighting, British troops exacted vengeance for Gate Pā. The Māori garrison was unable to hold the incomplete defences and, when Puhirake was killed, his force retreated.

British casualties were nine dead and 39 wounded. More than 100 of the defenders – including Puhirake – were buried in the trenches at Te Ranga. Twenty-seven severely wounded Māori were taken to hospital at Te Papa camp. Fourteen did not long survive the battle and were buried at Mission Cemetery. Among the mortally wounded was Te Tera of Ngāi Te Rangi, the only one identified in official reports.

The one-sided battle at Te Ranga largely crushed resistance in the vicinity of Tauranga Harbour. Some Ngāi Te Rangi and Ngāti Ranginui surrendered arms to the British at Camp Te Papa in ceremonies on 21 and 25 July. Much of their land was subsequently confiscated. This Historic Places Trust marker was erected at Te Ranga in 1964, 100 years after the battle.

== Demographics ==
Pyes Pa covers 13.46 km^{2} (5.20 sq mi) and had an estimated population of 15,350 as of June 2025, with a population density of 1,140 people per km^{2}.

Historical population
Year	Pop.	±% p.a.
2006	3,249	—
2013	6,435	+10.26%
2018	10,449	+10.18%
2023	14,454	+6.70%
The 2006 population is for a smaller area of 10.86 km^{2}. Source:

Pyes Pa had a population of 14,454 in the 2023 New Zealand census, an increase of 4,005 people (38.3%) since the 2018 census, an increase of 8,019 people (124.6%) since the 2013 census, and an increase of 11,205 people (344.9%) since the 2006 census. There were 6,993 males, 7,407 females, and 51 people of other genders in 4,887 dwellings. 1.9% of people identified as LGBTIQ+. The median age was 38.7 years (compared with 38.1 years nationally). There were 3,180 people (22.0%) aged under 15 years, 2,277 (15.8%) aged 15 to 29, 6,324 (43.8%) aged 30 to 64, and 2,670 (18.5%) aged 65 or older.

People could identify as more than one ethnicity. The results were 74.2% European (Pākehā); 13.6% Māori; 2.7% Pasifika; 19.2% Asian; 1.1% Middle Eastern, Latin American and African New Zealanders (MELAA); and 2.5% other, which includes people giving their ethnicity as "New Zealander". English was spoken by 94.9%, Māori by 2.5%, Samoan by 0.3%, and other languages by 18.4%. No language could be spoken by 2.2% (e.g. too young to talk). New Zealand Sign Language was known by 0.3%. The percentage of people born overseas was 31.8, compared with 28.8% nationally.

Religious affiliations were 35.0% Christian, 3.1% Hindu, 0.4% Islam, 1.0% Māori religious beliefs, 0.7% Buddhist, 0.2% New Age, and 7.3% other religions. People who answered that they had no religion were 45.3%, and 7.1% of people did not answer the census question.

Of those at least 15 years old, 2,841 (25.2%) people had a bachelor's or higher degree, 5,682 (50.4%) had a post-high school certificate or diploma, and 2,760 (24.5%) people exclusively held high school qualifications. The median income was $44,800, compared with $41,500 nationally. 1,515 people (13.4%) earned over $100,000 compared to 12.1% nationally. The employment status of those at least 15 was 5,835 (51.8%) full-time, 1,509 (13.4%) part-time, and 222 (2.0%) unemployed.

Individual statistical areas
Name	Area (km^{2})	Population	Density (per km^{2})	Dwellings	Median age	Median income
Keenan Road	2.59	222	86	78	47.5 years	$34,900
Pyes Pa North West	1.76	2,550	1,449	912	38.2 years	$46,700
Pyes Pa West	2.87	4,254	1,482	1,329	32.6 years	$55,700
Pyes Pa North	1.46	3,846	2,634	1,320	42.3 years	$35,300
Pyes Pa South	2.34	2,919	1,247	1,044	48.6 years	$43,300
Pyes Pa East	2.43	666	274	204	43.7 years	$39,400
New Zealand					38.1 years	$41,500

== Education ==
Pyes Pā School is a co-educational state primary school, with a roll of 226 as of March 2026.

The school was named in 1935 after the old school at Ngawaro was relocated to Pyes Pa. This building, a single classroom with a cold water tap on the porch and a donkey stove, was later used as a dental clinic and then as a Playcentre. In 1956 the building was moved back to Ngawaro to serve as the present clubroom for the Ngawaro Golf Course.

Taumata School is a primary school established in 2019, with a roll of 616. It is an Intermediate Inclusive School, known as a Full Primary, which goes from Year 0 to Year 8.

Aquinas College is a co-educational state-integrated Catholic secondary school established in 2003, with a roll of 854. It opened in 2003.
