= Parkvale =

Parkvale can refer to any of the following:

== Places ==
- Parkvale, Alberta, a suburb of Red Deer, Canada
- Parkvale Village, Discovery Bay, Hong Kong
- Parkvale, Hastings, a suburb of Hastings, New Zealand
- Parkvale, Tauranga, a suburb of Tauranga, New Zealand
- Parkvale, Renfrewshire, a suburb of Erskine, Scotland
- Parkvale, Pennsylvania, in Susquehanna County, United States

== Other ==
- Parkvale Savings Bank, a former bank in Pennsylvania, bought by FNB Corporation in 2012
- Parkvale F.C., a former Scottish football club
  - Stoneywood Parkvale F.C., its successor club
- Parkvale Mill, an alternative name for Hayford Mill, Cambusbarron, Scotland
- Parkvale Building, University of Pittsburgh, Pennsylvania
