= Ohauiti =

Suburb of Tauranga, New Zealand

- Suburb
- Interactive map of Ohauiti
- Coordinates: 37°45′50″S 176°10′25″E
- Country: New Zealand
- City: Tauranga
- Local authority: Tauranga City Council
- Electoral ward: Welcome Bay General Ward

Area
  - Land: 341 ha (840 acres)

Population (June 2025)
  - Total: 4,290
  - Density: 1,260/km^{2} (3,260/sq mi)

Greerton	Hairini	Welcome Bay
Pyes Pa	Ohauiti
Oropi

Ohauiti is a semi-rural suburb of Tauranga in the Bay of Plenty region of New Zealand's North Island. The original Ohauiti, a rural settlement, is located 10 kilometres to the south of the city centre, although the name is also used for new suburban developments just to the north, on the city's built-up edge. It is within a 10-minute drive of central Tauranga, and a 2-minute drive from the Toi Ohomai Institute of Technology.

The New Zealand Ministry for Culture and Heritage gives a translation of "place of little wind" for Ōhauiti.

Ohauiti reserve has open fields and native bush walkways for picnics and off-leash dog walking. Ohauiti has a shopping centre with a takeaways shop, a Bottlezone, a hairdressing salon, and a Four Square.

== Demographics ==
Ohauiti covers 3.41 km^{2} (1.32 sq mi) and had an estimated population of 4,290 as of June 2025, with a population density of 1,258 people per km^{2}.

Historical population
Year	Pop.	±% p.a.
2006	2,100	—
2013	2,682	+3.56%
2018	3,282	+4.12%
2023	4,020	+4.14%

Ohauiti had a population of 4,020 in the 2023 New Zealand census, an increase of 738 people (22.5%) since the 2018 census, and an increase of 1,338 people (49.9%) since the 2013 census. There were 1,959 males, 2,049 females, and 12 people of other genders in 1,494 dwellings. 1.9% of people identified as LGBTIQ+. The median age was 44.2 years (compared with 38.1 years nationally). There were 690 people (17.2%) aged under 15 years, 612 (15.2%) aged 15 to 29, 1,848 (46.0%) aged 30 to 64, and 873 (21.7%) aged 65 or older.

People could identify as more than one ethnicity. The results were 85.6% European (Pākehā); 12.8% Māori; 2.3% Pasifika; 9.0% Asian; 1.0% Middle Eastern, Latin American and African New Zealanders (MELAA); and 2.4% other, which includes people giving their ethnicity as "New Zealander". English was spoken by 96.5%, Māori by 1.9%, Samoan by 0.1%, and other languages by 12.3%. No language could be spoken by 1.9% (e.g. too young to talk). New Zealand Sign Language was known by 0.3%. The percentage of people born overseas was 26.1, compared with 28.8% nationally.

Religious affiliations were 35.4% Christian, 1.1% Hindu, 0.2% Islam, 0.2% Māori religious beliefs, 0.4% Buddhist, 0.3% New Age, 0.3% Jewish, and 2.0% other religions. People who answered that they had no religion were 52.0%, and 8.1% of people did not answer the census question.

Of those at least 15 years old, 786 (23.6%) people had a bachelor's or higher degree, 1,854 (55.7%) had a post-high school certificate or diploma, and 687 (20.6%) people exclusively held high school qualifications. The median income was $46,000, compared with $41,500 nationally. 453 people (13.6%) earned over $100,000 compared to 12.1% nationally. The employment status of those at least 15 was 1,719 (51.6%) full-time, 450 (13.5%) part-time, and 60 (1.8%) unemployed.
