= Hairini =

Suburb of Tauranga, New Zealand

- Suburb
- Interactive map of Hairini
- Coordinates: 37.726633°S 176.168399°E
- Country: New Zealand
- City: Tauranga
- Local authority: Tauranga City Council
- Electoral ward: Welcome Bay General Ward

Area
  - Land: 185 ha (460 acres)

Population (June 2025)
  - Total: 3,320
  - Density: 1,790/km^{2} (4,650/sq mi)

(Waimapu Estuary)	(Tauranga Harbour)	Maungatapu
Poike	Hairini	Welcome Bay
Oropi	Ohauiti

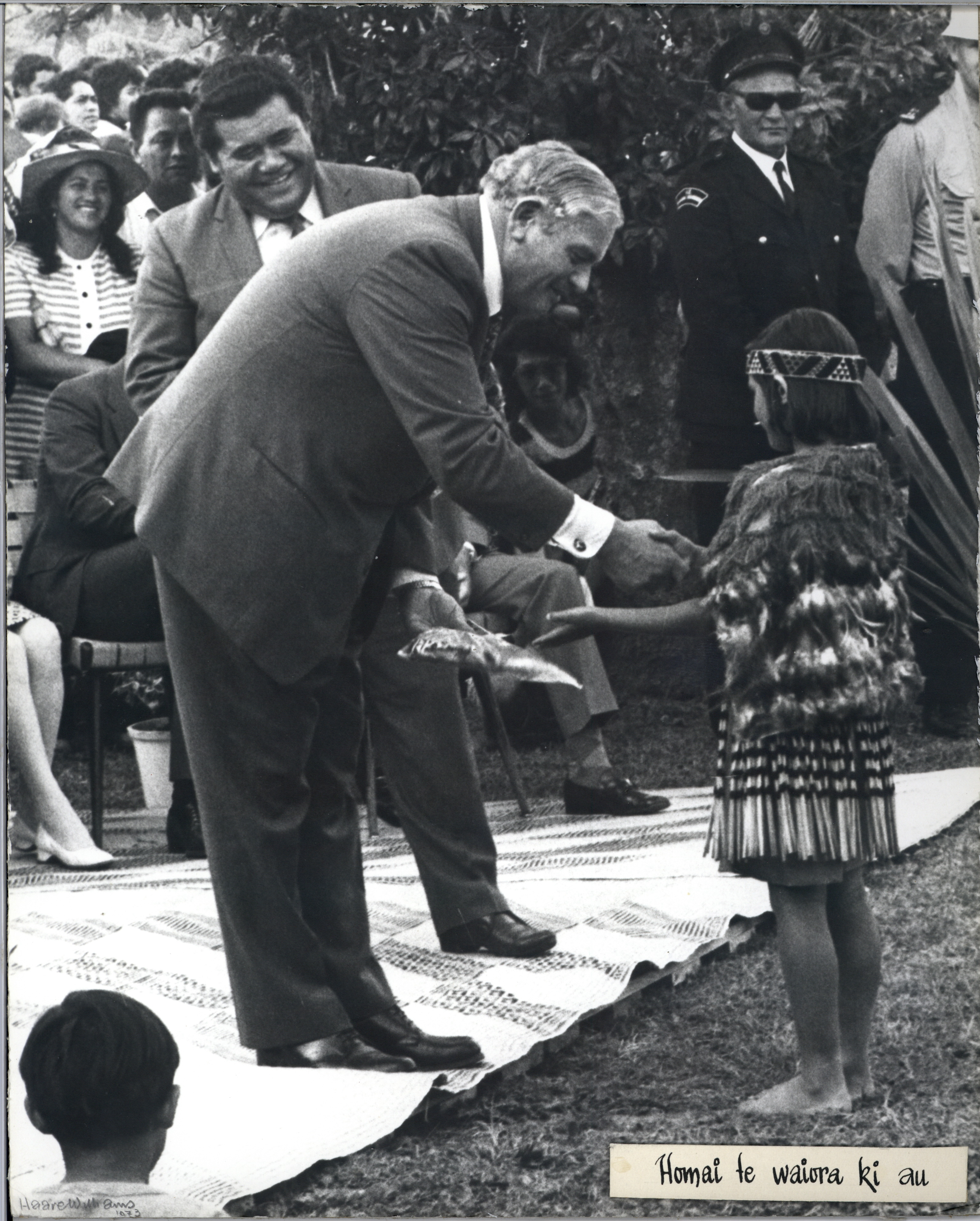
Norman Kirk and Matiu Rata at Hairini Marae in the Bay of Plenty.

Hairini is a suburb of Tauranga in the Bay of Plenty region of New Zealand's North Island.

== Demographics ==
Hairini covers 1.85 km^{2} (0.71 sq mi) and had an estimated population of 3,320 as of June 2025, with a population density of 1,795 people per km^{2}.

Historical population
Year	Pop.	±% p.a.
2006	2,952	—
2013	2,949	−0.01%
2018	3,330	+2.46%
2023	3,246	−0.51%

Hairini had a population of 3,246 in the 2023 New Zealand census, a decrease of 84 people (−2.5%) since the 2018 census, and an increase of 297 people (10.1%) since the 2013 census. There were 1,617 males, 1,617 females, and 9 people of other genders in 1,260 dwellings. 3.0% of people identified as LGBTIQ+. The median age was 40.0 years (compared with 38.1 years nationally). There were 576 people (17.7%) aged under 15 years, 576 (17.7%) aged 15 to 29, 1,344 (41.4%) aged 30 to 64, and 747 (23.0%) aged 65 or older.

People could identify as more than one ethnicity. The results were 76.8% European (Pākehā); 28.0% Māori; 2.6% Pasifika; 7.2% Asian; 0.8% Middle Eastern, Latin American and African New Zealanders (MELAA); and 2.2% other, which includes people giving their ethnicity as "New Zealander". English was spoken by 96.9%, Māori by 8.6%, Samoan by 0.2%, and other languages by 7.9%. No language could be spoken by 2.2% (e.g. too young to talk). New Zealand Sign Language was known by 0.5%. The percentage of people born overseas was 19.2, compared with 28.8% nationally.

Religious affiliations were 30.8% Christian, 0.9% Hindu, 0.6% Islam, 7.0% Māori religious beliefs, 0.6% Buddhist, 0.6% New Age, 0.1% Jewish, and 2.5% other religions. People who answered that they had no religion were 50.1%, and 7.4% of people did not answer the census question.

Of those at least 15 years old, 468 (17.5%) people had a bachelor's or higher degree, 1,560 (58.4%) had a post-high school certificate or diploma, and 639 (23.9%) people exclusively held high school qualifications. The median income was $37,600, compared with $41,500 nationally. 165 people (6.2%) earned over $100,000 compared to 12.1% nationally. The employment status of those at least 15 was 1,263 (47.3%) full-time, 315 (11.8%) part-time, and 81 (3.0%) unemployed.

== Marae ==
Hairini has two marae:

- Hairini Marae and Ranginui meeting house is a meeting place of the Ngāti Ranginui hapū of Ngāi Te Ahi
- Waimapu or Ruahine Marae and Te Kaupapa o Tawhito meeting house is a meeting place of the Ngāti Ranginui hapū of Ngāti Ruahine.
