= Poike, New Zealand =

Suburb of Tauranga, New Zealand

Poike
- Suburb
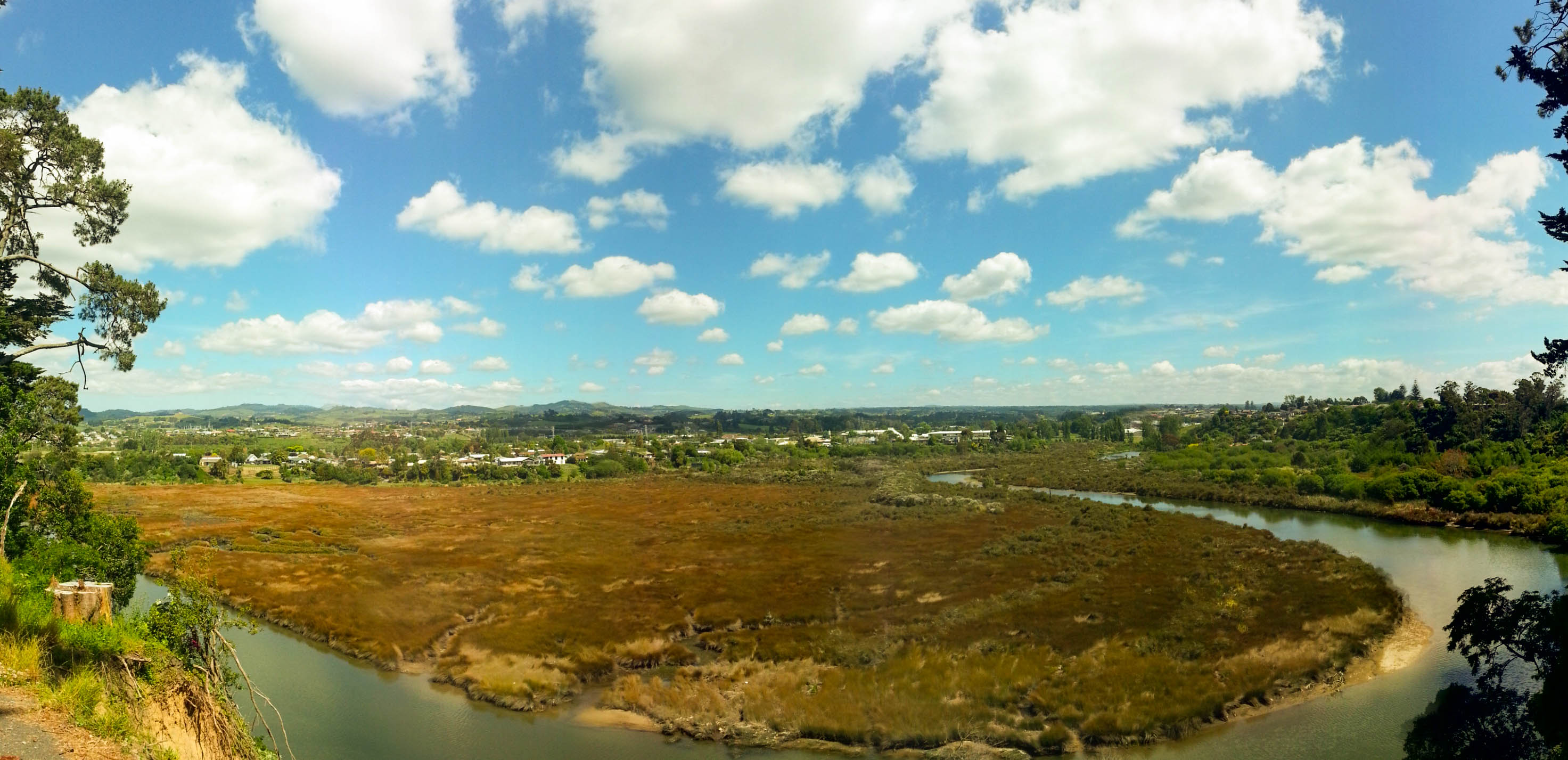
- View from Yatton Park
- Interactive map of Poike
- Coordinates: 37.731723°S 176.150077°E
- Country: New Zealand
- City: Tauranga
- Local authority: Tauranga City Council
- Electoral ward: Tauriko General Ward

Area
  - Land: 129 ha (320 acres)

Population (June 2025)
  - Total: 1,200
  - Density: 930/km^{2} (2,400/sq mi)

Merivale		(Waimapu Estuary)
Greerton	Poike	Hairini
Pyes Pa		Ohauiti

Poike or Windermere is a suburb of Tauranga, in the Bay of Plenty Region of New Zealand's North Island.

== Demographics ==
Poike covers 1.29 km^{2} (0.50 sq mi) and had an estimated population of 1,200 as of June 2025, with a population density of 930 people per km^{2}.

Historical population
Year	Pop.	±% p.a.
2006	804	—
2013	738	−1.22%
2018	789	+1.35%
2023	1,062	+6.12%

Poike had a population of 1,062 in the 2023 New Zealand census, an increase of 273 people (34.6%) since the 2018 census, and an increase of 324 people (43.9%) since the 2013 census. There were 531 males, 528 females, and 3 people of other genders in 342 dwellings. 3.4% of people identified as LGBTIQ+. The median age was 29.4 years (compared with 38.1 years nationally). There were 237 people (22.3%) aged under 15 years, 309 (29.1%) aged 15 to 29, 435 (41.0%) aged 30 to 64, and 78 (7.3%) aged 65 or older.

People could identify as more than one ethnicity. The results were 71.2% European (Pākehā); 33.3% Māori; 3.4% Pasifika; 10.2% Asian; 1.4% Middle Eastern, Latin American and African New Zealanders (MELAA); and 3.1% other, which includes people giving their ethnicity as "New Zealander". English was spoken by 94.4%, Māori by 9.0%, and other languages by 10.5%. No language could be spoken by 4.2% (e.g. too young to talk). New Zealand Sign Language was known by 0.6%. The percentage of people born overseas was 18.9, compared with 28.8% nationally.

Religious affiliations were 22.0% Christian, 1.4% Hindu, 0.3% Islam, 6.2% Māori religious beliefs, 1.1% Buddhist, 0.8% New Age, and 1.7% other religions. People who answered that they had no religion were 59.3%, and 7.1% of people did not answer the census question.

Of those at least 15 years old, 159 (19.3%) people had a bachelor's or higher degree, 522 (63.3%) had a post-high school certificate or diploma, and 147 (17.8%) people exclusively held high school qualifications. The median income was $44,700, compared with $41,500 nationally. 48 people (5.8%) earned over $100,000 compared to 12.1% nationally. The employment status of those at least 15 was 477 (57.8%) full-time, 126 (15.3%) part-time, and 24 (2.9%) unemployed.

== Education ==
Toi Ohomai Institute of Technology is based in Poike.

Te Whakatipuranga, a secondary school teen parent unit, is also based on the same campus.
