= Tauranga =

Coastal city in the Bay of Plenty Region, New Zealand

- City
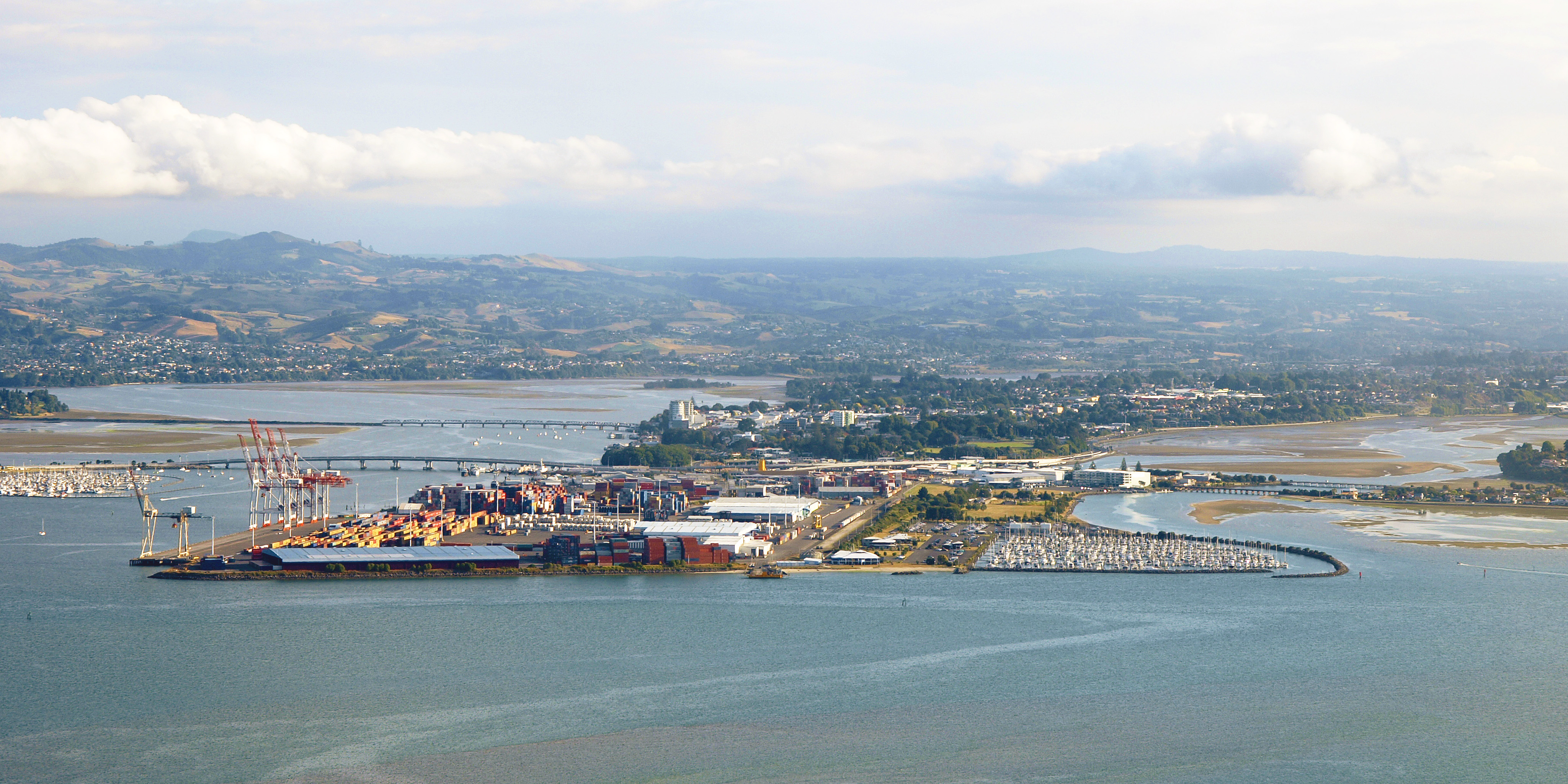
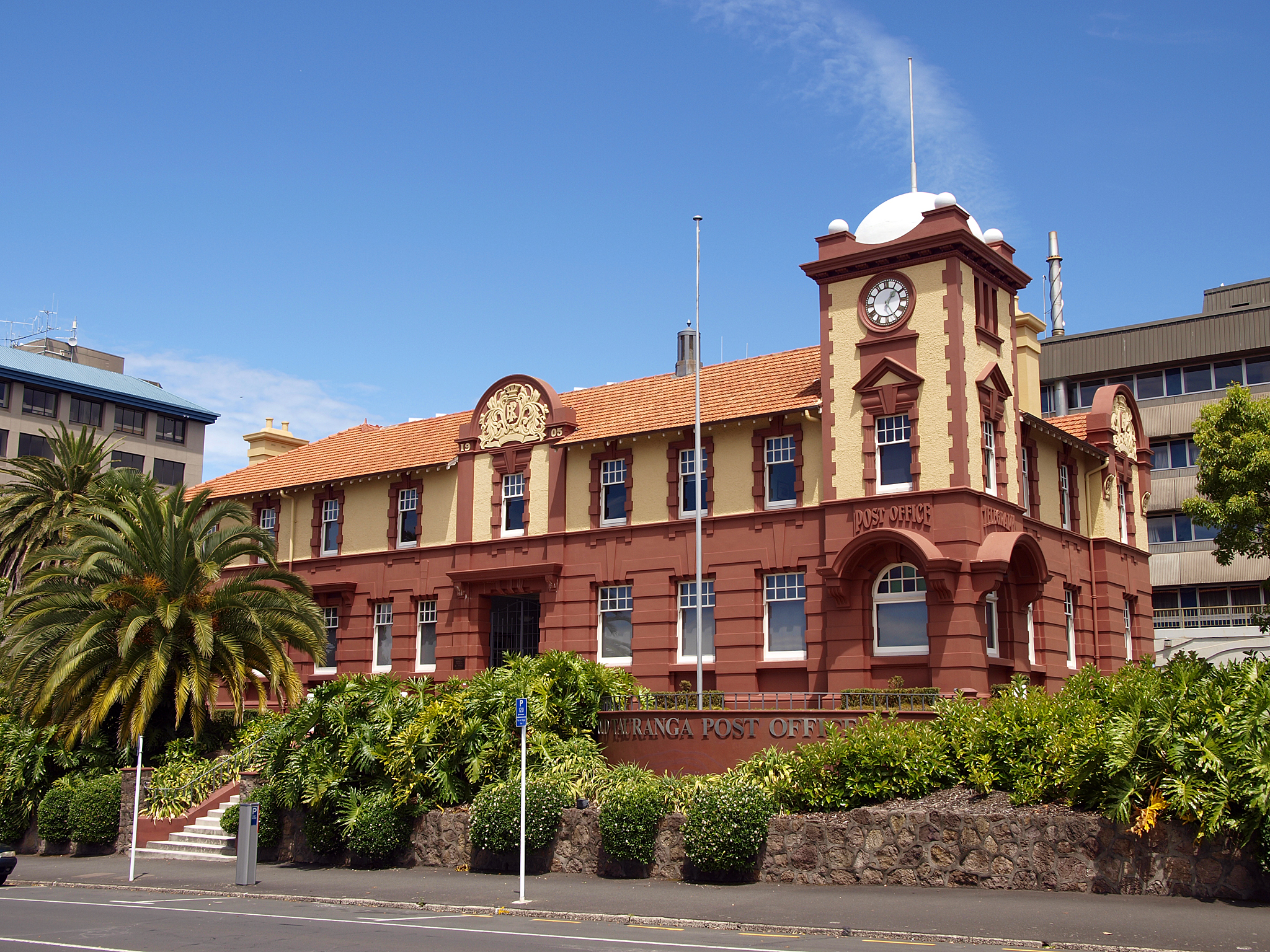
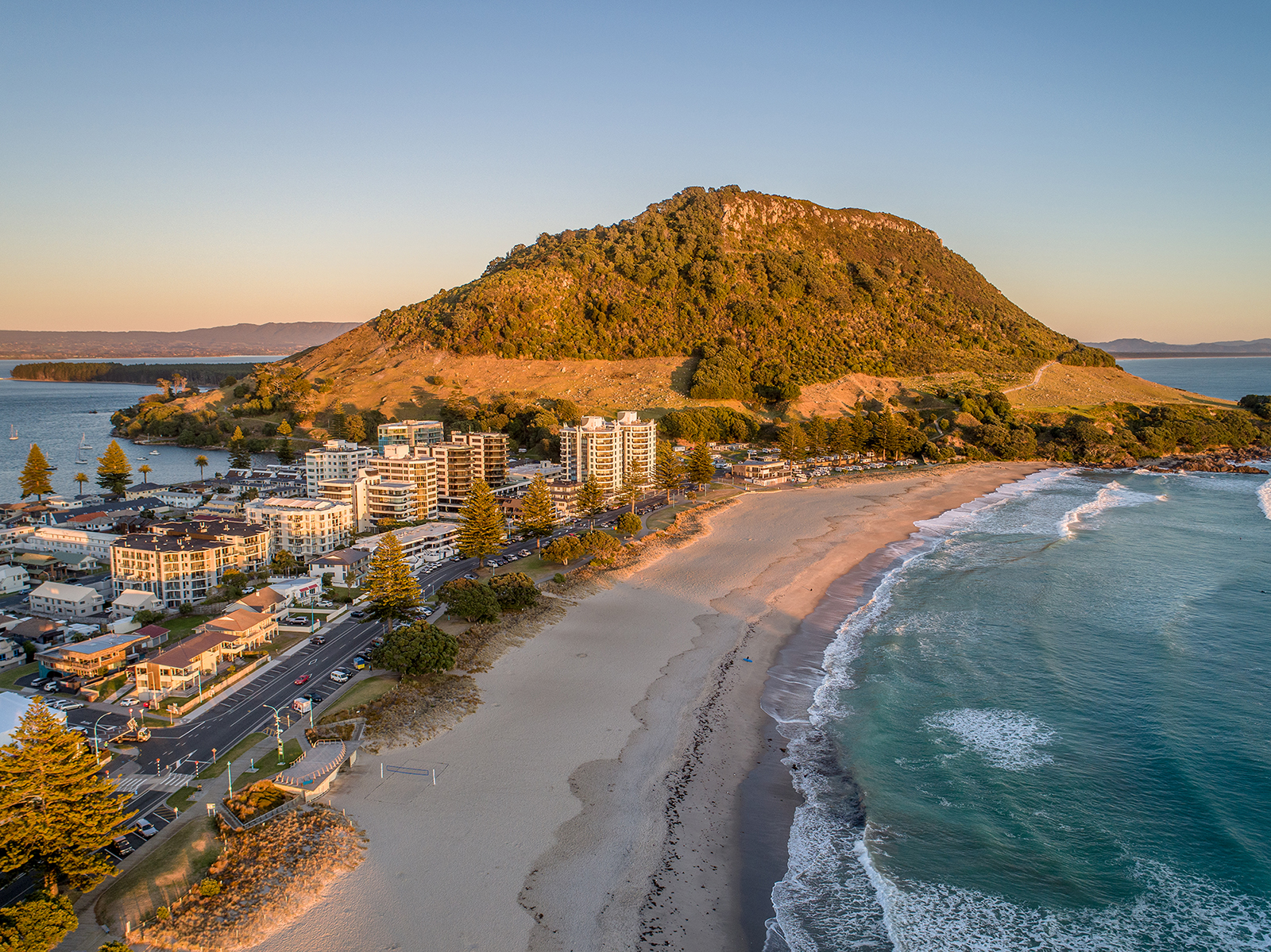
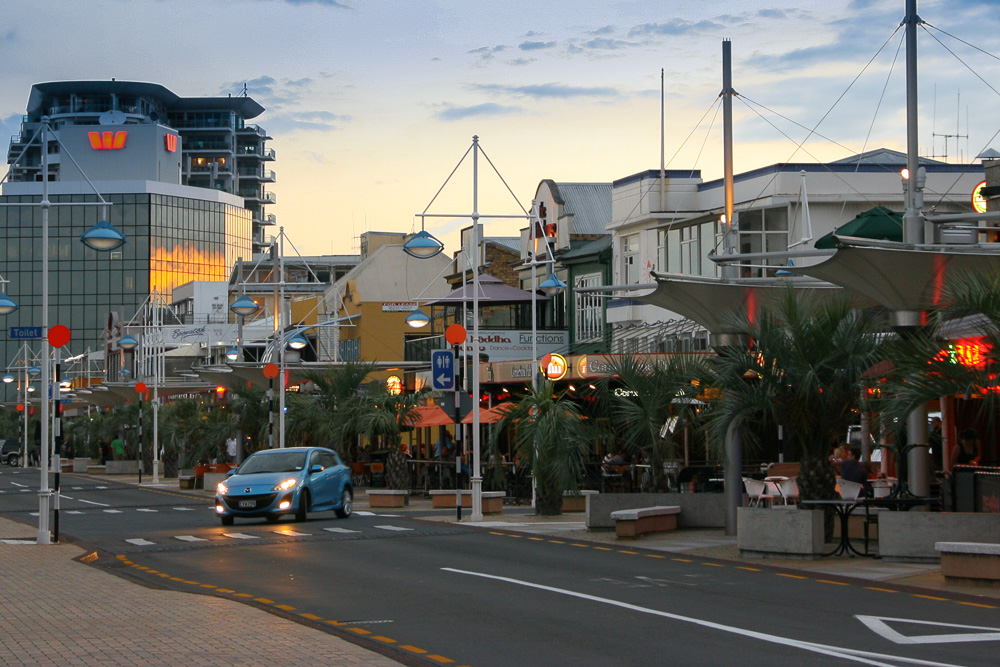
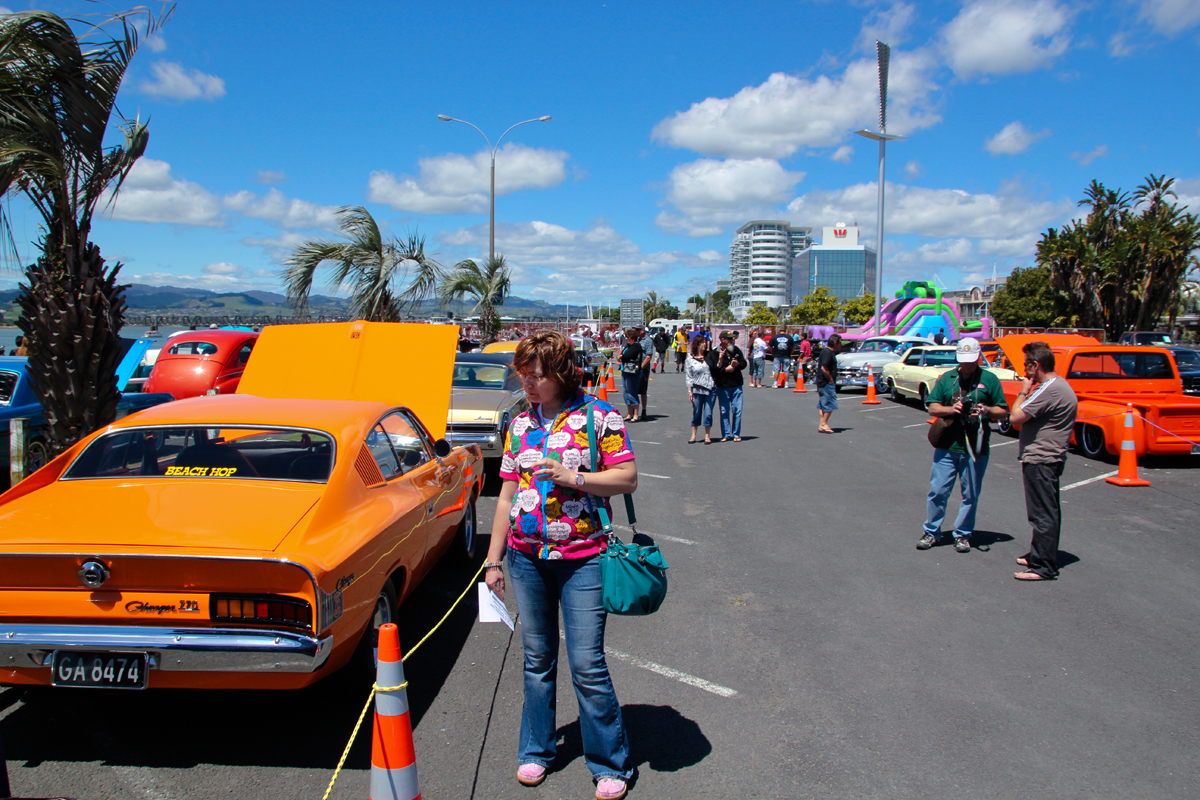
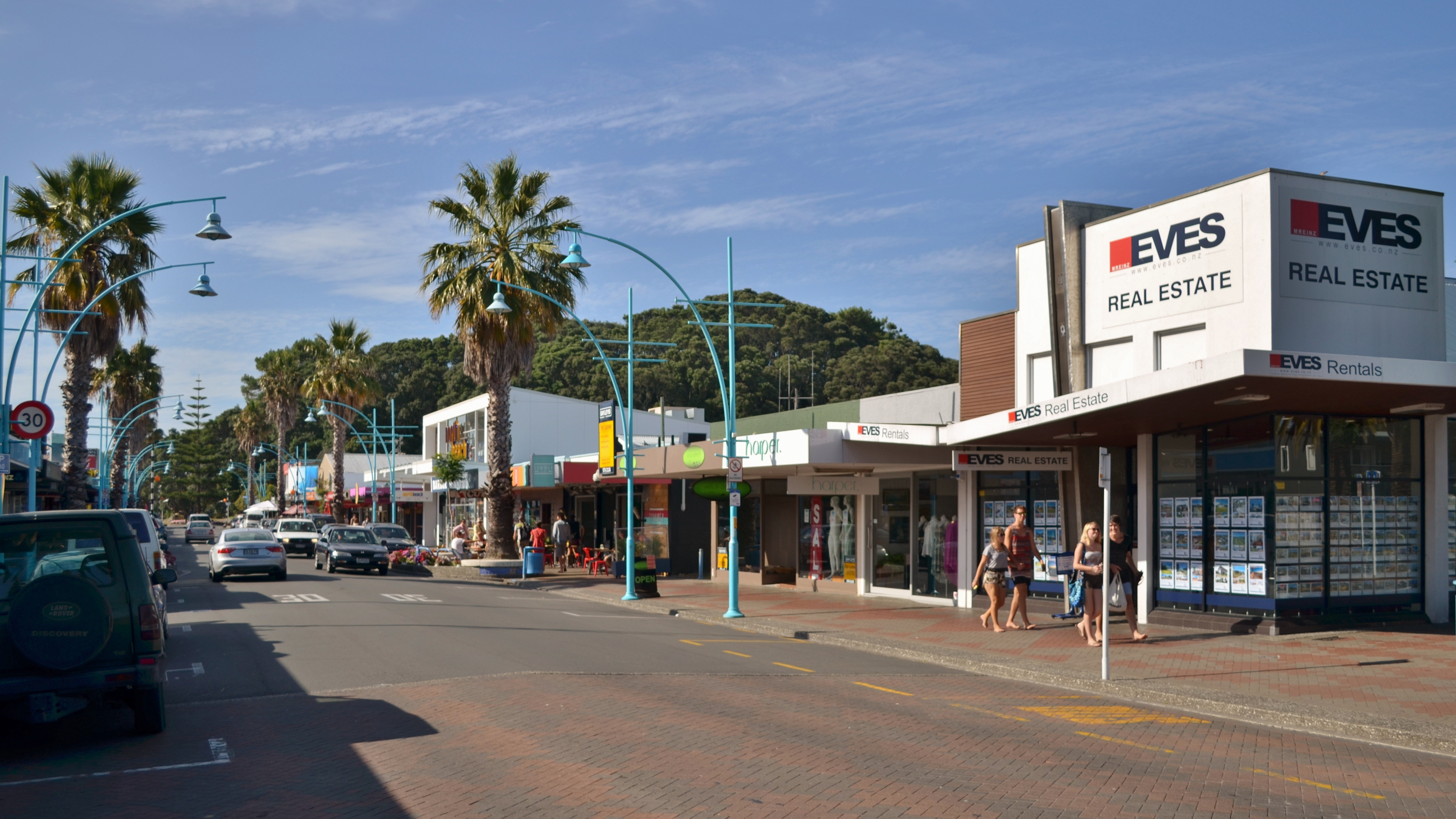
- Tauranga City Tauranga Post Office Mount Maunganui Downtown Tauranga The Strand Maunganui Road

- Location of Tauranga in the North Island
- Coordinates: 37°41′S 176°10′E
- Country: New Zealand
- Island: North Island
- Region: Bay of Plenty
- Wards: Mauao/Mount Maunganui; Matua-Otūmoetai; Te Papa; Bethlehem; Tauriko; Welcome Bay; Arataki; Pāpāmoa; Te Awanui (Māori)
- Settled: 1250–1300
- Gazetted as a borough: 1882
- City constituted: 17 April 1963
- Electorate(s): Tauranga; Mt Maunganui

Government
  - MP (Tauranga): Sam Uffindell (New Zealand National Party)
  - MP (Mt Maunganui): Tom Rutherford (New Zealand National Party)
  - Mayor: Mahé Drysdale
  - Deputy Mayor: Jen Scoular
  - Territorial authority: Tauranga City Council

Area
  - Land: 141.91 km^{2} (54.79 sq mi)
- Highest elevation: 232 m (761 ft)
- Lowest elevation: 0 m (0 ft)

Population (June 2025)
  - Territorial: 161,000
  - Density: 1,130/km^{2} (2,940/sq mi)
  - Urban: 160,900
- Time zone: UTC+12:00 (NZST)
  - Summer (DST): UTC+13:00 (NZDT)
- Postcode(s): Map of postcodes 3110, 3112, 3116, 3118
- Area code: 07
- Local iwi: Ngāti Ranginui, Ngāi Te Rangi, Ngāti Pūkenga
- Website: Tauranga.govt.nz

Tauranga (Māori pronunciation: [ˈtaʉɾaŋa], Māori language for "resting place" or "anchorage") is a coastal city in the Bay of Plenty Region and the fifth-most populous city of New Zealand, with an urban population of 160,900 (June 2025), or roughly 3% of the national population. It was settled by Māori late in the 13th century and colonised by Europeans in the early 19th century. It was constituted as a city in 1963.

The city lies in the northwestern corner of the Bay of Plenty, on the southeastern edge of Tauranga Harbour. The city extends over an area of 141.91 square kilometres (54.79 sq mi), and encompasses the communities of Bethlehem, on the southwestern outskirts of the city; Greerton, on the southern outskirts of the city; Matua, west of the central city overlooking Tauranga Harbour; Maungatapu; Mount Maunganui, located north of the central city across the harbour facing the Bay of Plenty; Otūmoetai; Papamoa, Tauranga's largest suburb, located in the Bay of Plenty; Tauranga City; Tauranga South; and Welcome Bay.

Tauranga is one of New Zealand's main centres for business, international trade, culture, fashion and horticultural science. The Port of Tauranga is New Zealand's largest export port and plays a major role in the country's freight and supply chain system. Tauranga is one of New Zealand's fastest-growing cities, with an 11% increase in population between the 2006 census and the 2013 census, and 19% between the 2013 and 2018 census. Due to its rapid population growth, Tauranga has become New Zealand's fifth-largest city, overtaking Dunedin and the Napier-Hastings urban areas.

== History ==
=== Settlement ===
The earliest known settlers were Māori, who arrived in the 13th century at Tauranga in the Tākitimu and the Mātaatua waka.

At 9 am on Friday, 23 June 1826, Herald was the first European ship to enter Tauranga Harbour. The Revd Henry Williams conducted a Christian service at Otamataha Pā. In December 1826 and again in March 1827, the Herald travelled to Tauranga from the Bay of Islands to obtain supplies of potatoes, pigs and flax. In 1835 a Church Missionary Society mission station was established at Tauranga by William Wade. Rev. Alfred N. Brown arrived at the CMS mission station in 1838. John Morgan also visited the mission in 1838.

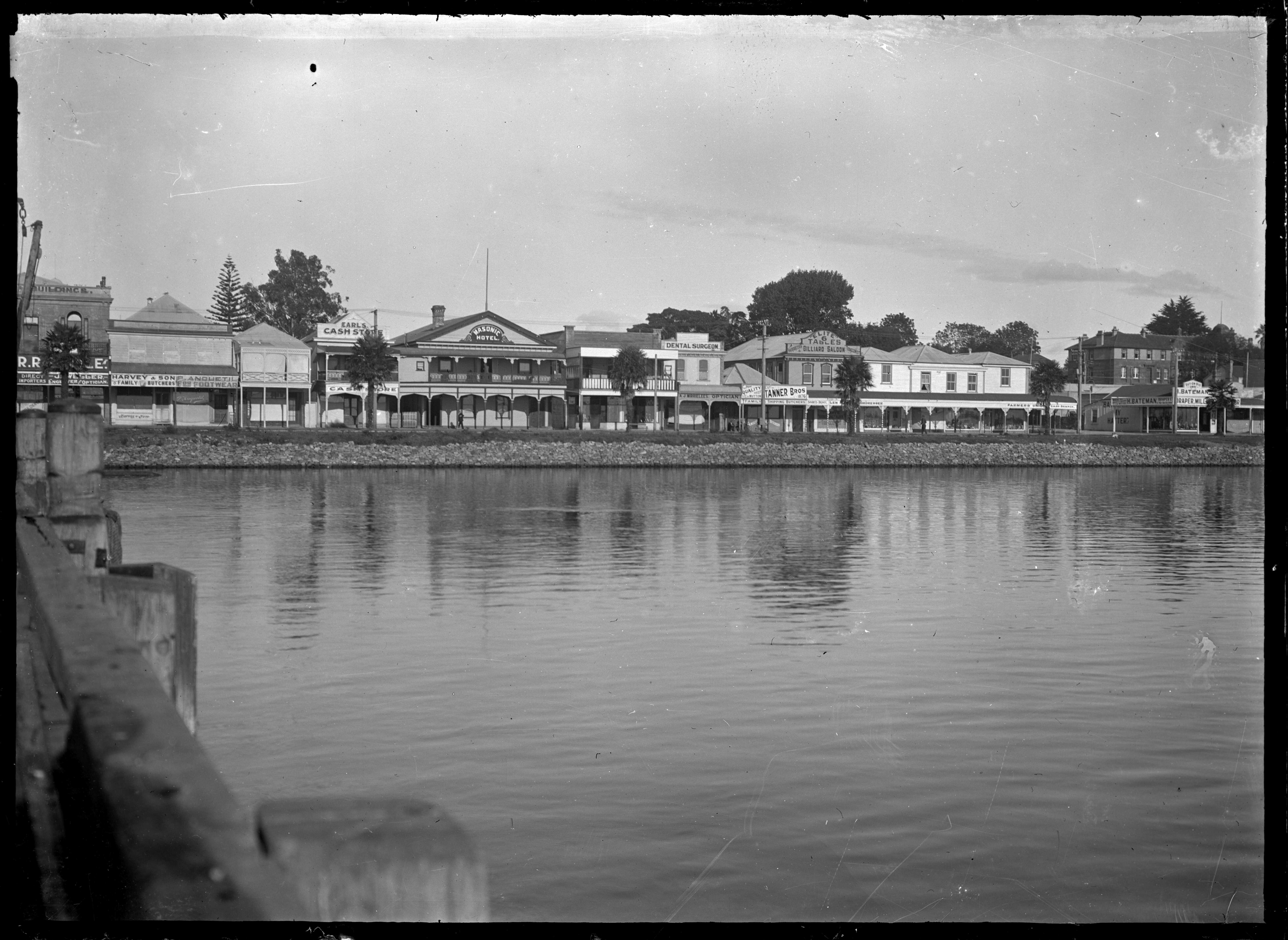
View of waterfront in 1924

Europeans trading in flax were active in the Bay of Plenty during the 1830s; some were transient, others married local women and settled permanently. The first permanent non-Maori trader was James Farrow, who travelled to Tauranga in 1829, obtaining flax fibre for Australian merchants in exchange for muskets and gunpowder. Farrow acquired a land area of 2,000 square metres (1/2 acre) on 10 January 1838 at Otūmoetai Pā from the chiefs Tupaea, Tangimoana and Te Omanu, the earliest authenticated land purchase in the Bay of Plenty.

In 1840, a Catholic mission station was established. Bishop Pompallier was given land within the palisades of Otūmoetai Pā for a church and a presbytery. The mission station closed in 1863 due to land wars in the Waikato district.

=== New Zealand Wars ===
The Tauranga Campaign took place in and around Tauranga from 21 January to 21 June 1864, during the New Zealand Wars. The Battle of Gate Pā, the best known battle, was an attack on the well fortified pā and its Māori defenders on 29 April 1864 by British forces made up of approximately 300 men of the 43rd Regiment and a naval contingent. The British casualties were 31 dead (including 10 officers), and 80 wounded – the highest loss of life suffered by the British military in the New Zealand Wars. The Māori defenders abandoned the pā during the night with casualties estimated at 25 dead and an unknown number of wounded.

=== Fires ===
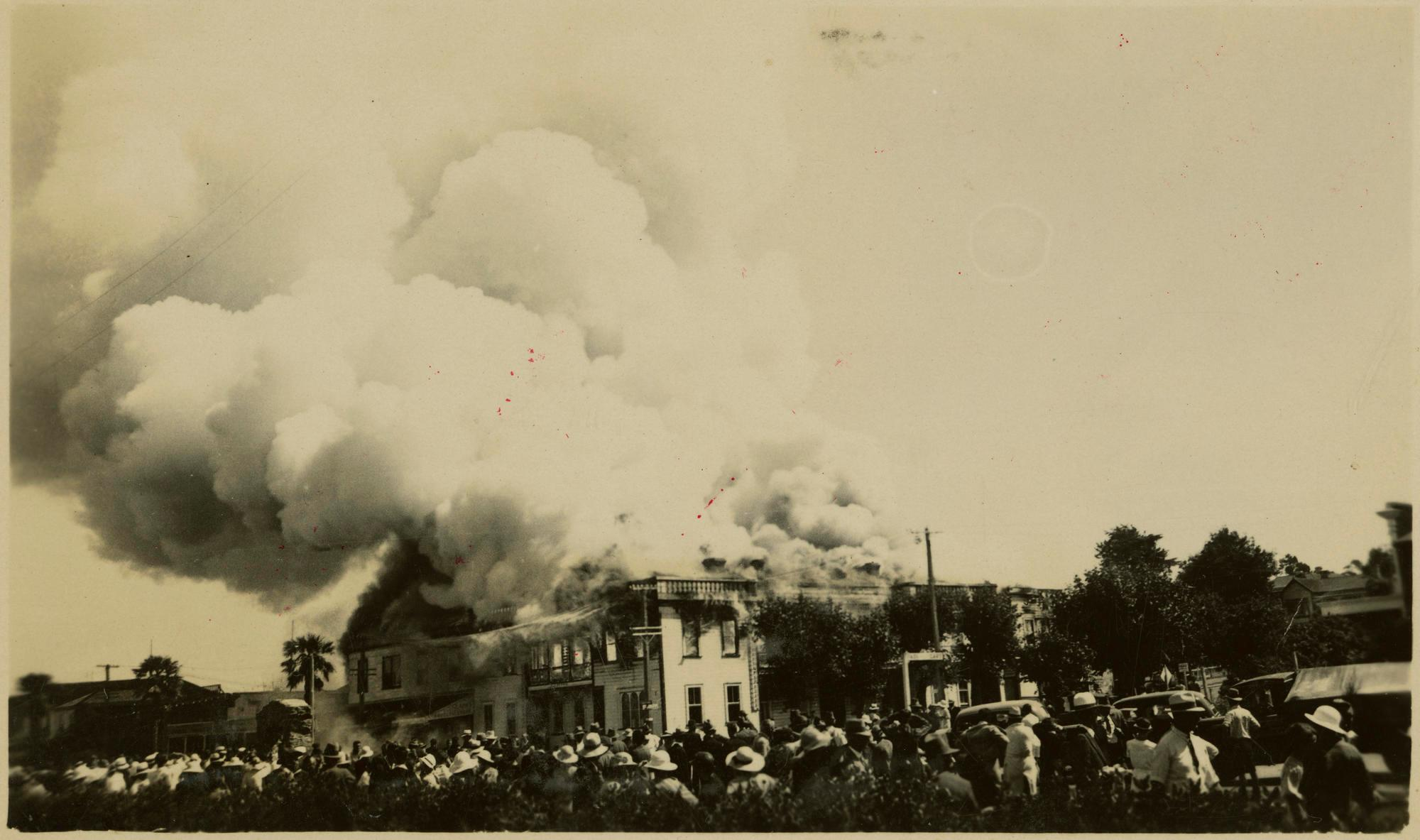
Tauranga Hotel on fire, surrounded by a large crowd, 1936

A fire broke out in a store at 8:00pm on 31 May 1881 and spread, destroying all the buildings in one block in the town and others in adjacent blocks. There was no fire brigade available.

In November 1916, a large fire broke out on The Strand, destroying the Commercial Hotel and 11 other buildings.

In 1936 another large fire occurred which started in the hotel's staff quarters and drew large crowds.

=== Modern era ===
Under the Local Government (Tauranga City Council) Order 2003, Tauranga became legally a city for a second time, from 1 March 2004.

In August 2011, Tauranga received Ultra-Fast Broadband as part of the New Zealand Government's rollout.

On 22 January 2026 a landslide occurred at the Mount Maunganui camp ground leaving six people dead, and another landslide occurred in Welcome Bay which left two more people dead.

== Geography ==
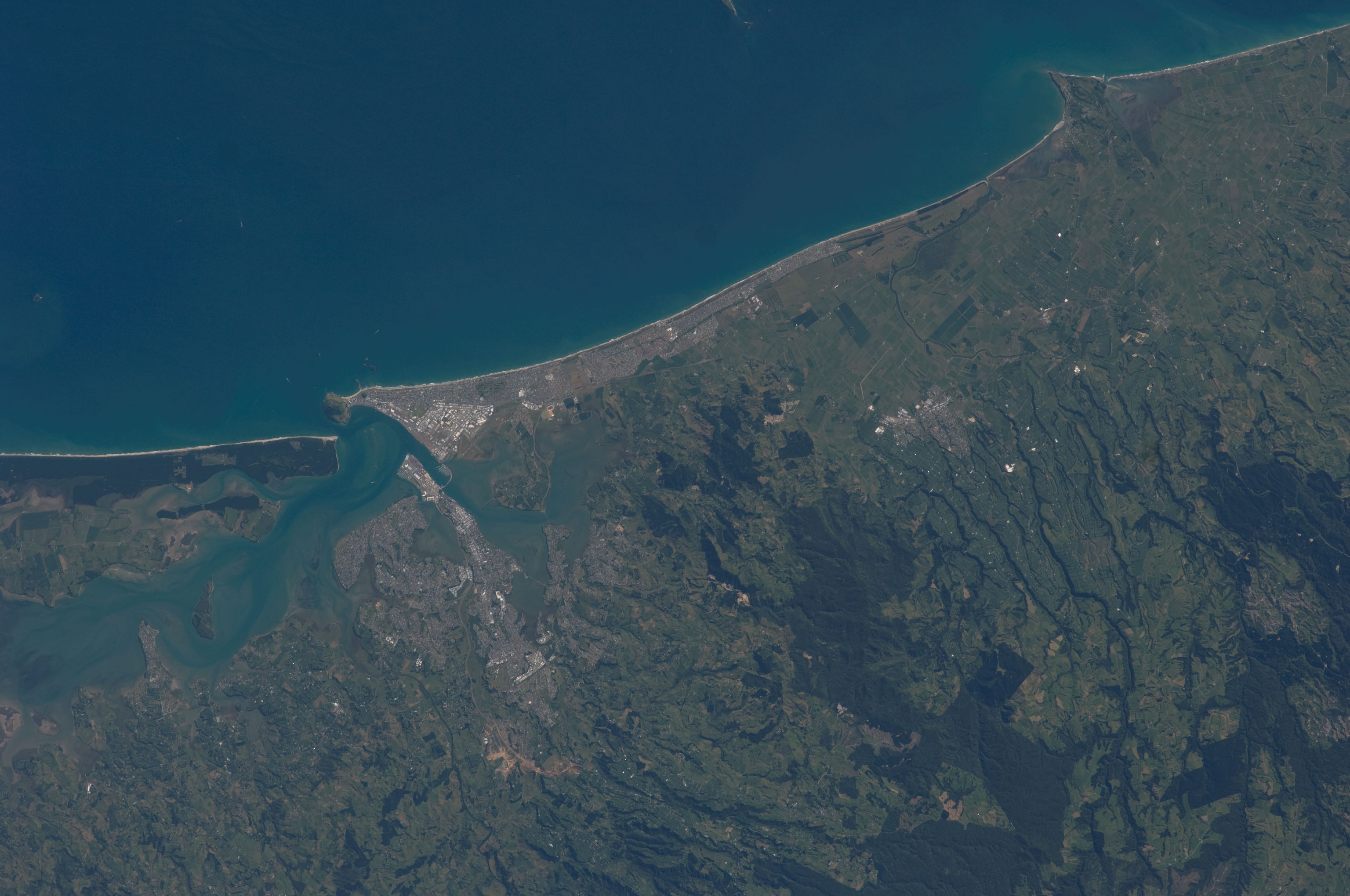
Satellite view of Tauranga and surrounding area

Tauranga is located around a large harbour that extends along the western Bay of Plenty, and is protected by Matakana Island and the extinct volcano of Mauao (Mount Maunganui). Ngāumuwahine River is located 19 kilometres southwest of Tauranga.

Tauranga and the Bay of Plenty are situated along a faultline and so experience (infrequent) seismic activity. There are a few volcanoes around the area, including both dormant volcanoes such as Mauao, nicknamed "The Mount" by locals, and active volcanoes such as White Island.

Tauranga is roughly the antipode of Jaén, Spain.

=== Suburbs ===
Tauranga City consists of the following suburbs, sorted by 2018 general electoral ward:

- Te Papa / Welcome Bay Ward:
  - Gate Pa
  - Greerton
  - Hairini
  - Maungatapu
  - Merivale
  - Motuopuhi Island (Rat Island)
  - Ohauiti
  - Poike
  - Tauranga (Note: Otherwise known as Tauranga city centre or Tauranga CBD.)
  - Tauranga South
  - Waikareao Estuary
  - Welcome Bay
- Otumoetai / Pyes Pa Ward:
  - Bellevue
  - Bethlehem
  - Brookfield
  - Judea
  - Matua
  - Omanawa
  - Otūmoetai
  - Pyes Pa
  - Tauriko
  - The Lakes Village
- Mount Maunganui / Papamoa Ward:
  - Arataki
  - Kairua
  - Matapihi
  - Mount Maunganui
  - Moturiki Island
  - Motuotau Island
  - Omanu
  - Papamoa Beach
  - Waitao

=== Climate ===
Tauranga has an oceanic or maritime temperate climate (cfb) in the Köppen Climate Classification. Though in the Trewartha Climate Classification it is subtropical (cfbl)

During the summer months the population swells as holidaymakers descend on the city, especially along the popular white coastal surf beaches from Mount Maunganui to Papamoa.

Climate data for Tauranga (1991–2020 normals, extremes 1913–present)
Month	Jan	Feb	Mar	Apr	May	Jun	Jul	Aug	Sep	Oct	Nov	Dec	Year
Record high °C (°F)	33.7 (92.7)	33.9 (93.0)	30.3 (86.5)	28.4 (83.1)	23.9 (75.0)	21.9 (71.4)	22.8 (73.0)	20.7 (69.3)	24.7 (76.5)	25.6 (78.1)	29.2 (84.6)	31.2 (88.2)	33.9 (93.0)
Mean maximum °C (°F)	28.4 (83.1)	28.4 (83.1)	26.3 (79.3)	24.0 (75.2)	21.1 (70.0)	18.5 (65.3)	17.6 (63.7)	18.2 (64.8)	20.1 (68.2)	22.1 (71.8)	24.9 (76.8)	26.8 (80.2)	29.3 (84.7)
Mean daily maximum °C (°F)	24.3 (75.7)	24.4 (75.9)	22.9 (73.2)	20.3 (68.5)	17.7 (63.9)	15.4 (59.7)	14.6 (58.3)	15.2 (59.4)	16.7 (62.1)	18.5 (65.3)	20.5 (68.9)	22.6 (72.7)	19.4 (66.9)
Daily mean °C (°F)	19.8 (67.6)	20.1 (68.2)	18.4 (65.1)	15.9 (60.6)	13.6 (56.5)	11.2 (52.2)	10.5 (50.9)	11.0 (51.8)	12.5 (54.5)	14.3 (57.7)	16.1 (61.0)	18.3 (64.9)	15.1 (59.2)
Mean daily minimum °C (°F)	15.3 (59.5)	15.8 (60.4)	13.9 (57.0)	11.6 (52.9)	9.4 (48.9)	7.1 (44.8)	6.3 (43.3)	6.7 (44.1)	8.3 (46.9)	10.0 (50.0)	11.6 (52.9)	14.1 (57.4)	10.8 (51.4)
Mean minimum °C (°F)	9.7 (49.5)	10.5 (50.9)	8.6 (47.5)	5.3 (41.5)	3.5 (38.3)	1.5 (34.7)	0.9 (33.6)	1.2 (34.2)	2.4 (36.3)	4.1 (39.4)	5.7 (42.3)	8.8 (47.8)	0.2 (32.4)
Record low °C (°F)	3.3 (37.9)	1.7 (35.1)	0.7 (33.3)	−0.6 (30.9)	−5.3 (22.5)	−4.8 (23.4)	−4.2 (24.4)	−3.4 (25.9)	−4.6 (23.7)	−2.3 (27.9)	0.6 (33.1)	−0.9 (30.4)	−5.3 (22.5)
Average rainfall mm (inches)	76.2 (3.00)	83.2 (3.28)	94.9 (3.74)	132.1 (5.20)	116.2 (4.57)	120.6 (4.75)	133.4 (5.25)	111.6 (4.39)	86.5 (3.41)	80.4 (3.17)	63.4 (2.50)	103 (4.1)	1,201.5 (47.36)
Average rainy days (≥ 1.0 mm)	6.3	6.7	8.1	8.7	9.6	10.7	11.7	11.7	10.7	9.6	8.6	8.5	110.9
Average relative humidity (%)	72.8	76.4	78.5	79.8	83.3	85.0	84.3	81.7	76.2	76.1	71.8	73.4	78.3
Mean monthly sunshine hours	269.0	221.5	221.4	184.3	170.9	134.1	149.9	176.4	178.2	214.8	240.0	241.0	2,401.5
Mean daily daylight hours	14.4	13.5	12.3	11.1	10.1	9.6	9.8	10.7	11.9	13.1	14.2	14.7	12.1
Percentage possible sunshine	60	58	58	55	55	47	49	53	50	53	56	53	54
Source 1: NIWA Climate Data
Source 2: Weather Spark

== Demographics ==
In 1976 Tauranga was a medium-sized urban area with a population of around 48,000. The completion of a harbour bridge in 1988 brought Tauranga and The Mount closer (they amalgamated in 1989) and re-energised the economies of both parts of the enlarged city. By 1996 Tauranga's population had grown to 82,092 and by 2006 had reached 103,635. By 2023, it had reached 152,844.

In 2008 Tauranga overtook Dunedin to become the sixth-largest city in New Zealand by urban area, and the ninth largest city by Territorial Authority area. With continuing growth it has now surpassed the Napier-Hastings area to become New Zealand's fifth-largest city.

Tauranga covers 141.91 km^{2} (54.79 sq mi) and had an estimated population of 161,000 as of June 2025, with a population density of 1,135 people per km^{2}.

Historical population
Year	Pop.	±% p.a.
2006	103,881	—
2013	115,161	+1.48%
2018	137,130	+3.55%
2023	152,844	+2.19%

Tauranga had a population of 152,844 in the 2023 New Zealand census, an increase of 15,714 people (11.5%) since the 2018 census, and an increase of 37,683 people (32.7%) since the 2013 census. There were 73,821 males, 78,558 females and 462 people of other genders in 55,929 dwellings. 2.5% of people identified as LGBTIQ+. The median age was 39.4 years (compared with 38.1 years nationally). There were 29,604 people (19.4%) aged under 15 years, 26,316 (17.2%) aged 15 to 29, 66,786 (43.7%) aged 30 to 64, and 30,138 (19.7%) aged 65 or older.

People could identify as more than one ethnicity. The results were 78.7% European (Pākehā); 19.3% Māori; 3.6% Pasifika; 10.3% Asian; 1.8% Middle Eastern, Latin American and African New Zealanders (MELAA); and 2.1% other, which includes people giving their ethnicity as "New Zealander". English was spoken by 96.2%, Māori language by 4.5%, Samoan by 0.4% and other languages by 12.5%. No language could be spoken by 2.1% (e.g. too young to talk). New Zealand Sign Language was known by 0.4%. The percentage of people born overseas was 25.2, compared with 28.8% nationally.

Religious affiliations were 31.3% Christian, 1.5% Hindu, 0.4% Islam, 1.9% Māori religious beliefs, 0.6% Buddhist, 0.4% New Age, 0.1% Jewish, and 3.3% other religions. People who answered that they had no religion were 53.7%, and 6.9% of people did not answer the census question.

Of those at least 15 years old, 22,431 (18.2%) people had a bachelor's or higher degree, 64,740 (52.5%) had a post-high school certificate or diploma, and 29,052 (23.6%) people exclusively held high school qualifications. The median income was $42,100, compared with $41,500 nationally. 14,001 people (11.4%) earned over $100,000 compared to 12.1% nationally. The employment status of those at least 15 was that 61,218 (49.7%) people were employed full-time, 17,007 (13.8%) were part-time, and 3,252 (2.6%) were unemployed.

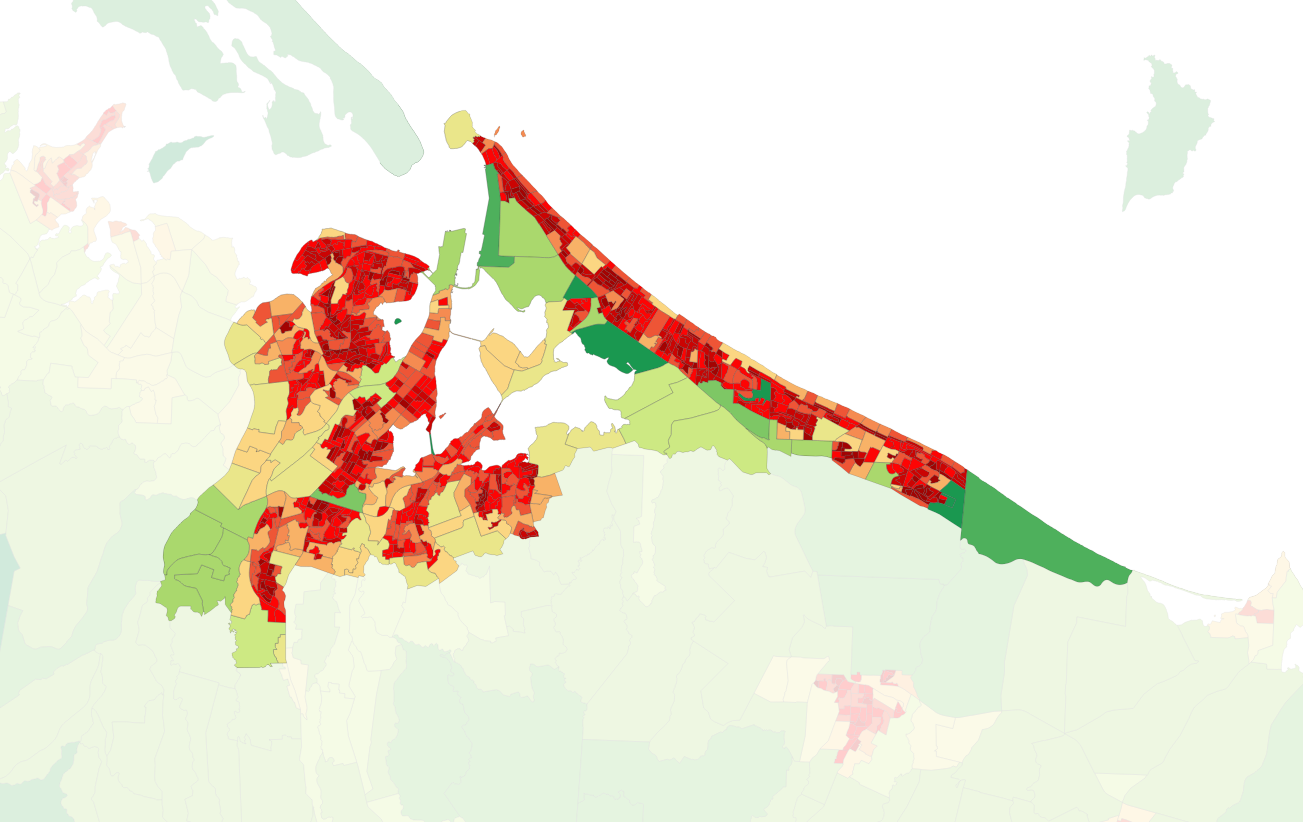
Population density in the 2023 census

Individual wards
Name	Area (km^{2})	Population	Density (per km^{2})	Dwellings	Median age	Median income
Mauao/Mount Maunganui General Ward	18.34	16,005	873	6,174	38.9 years	$47,900
Matua-Otūmoetai General Ward	7.87	18,942	2,407	7,044	41.0 years	$44,400
Te Papa General Ward	10.88	18,522	1,702	6,960	37.4 years	$38,100
Bethlehem General Ward	21.27	18,819	885	7,068	44.0 years	$39,600
Tauriko General Ward	24.68	18,849	764	6,543	37.9 years	$44,100
Welcome Bay General Ward	18.25	20,526	1,125	7,149	38.4 years	$42,800
Arataki General Ward	19.44	18,816	968	7,215	43.5 years	$38,500
Pāpāmoa General Ward	21.19	22,365	1,055	7,779	36.2 years	$43,800
New Zealand					38.1 years	$41,500

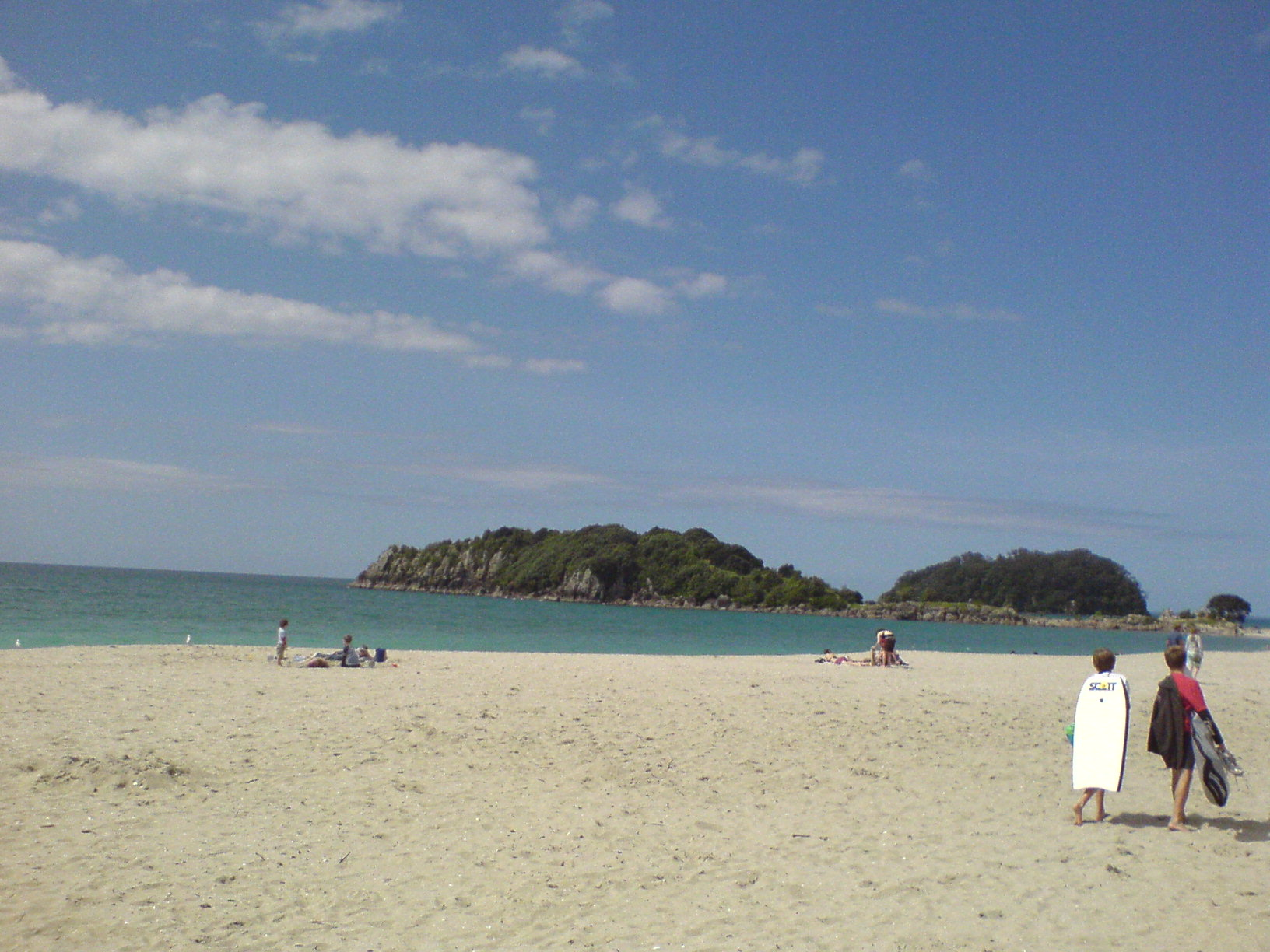
Mount Maunganui Main Beach in winter, with 'Leisure Island' in the background

== Government and politics ==
For elections to the New Zealand Parliament, the city of Tauranga is in the Tauranga, Bay of Plenty, and Waiariki electorates.

Tauranga is located in the administrative area of the Tauranga City Council. The council consists of the Mayor of Tauranga and nine councillors. The mayor is elected by the city at-large, while the councillors are elected from nine wards (constituencies), each ward electing a single councillor. Elections are held via single transferable vote.

The present nine wards were first established for the 2024 local elections. There are eight general wards (Mauao/Mount Maunganui, Arataki, Pāpāmoa, Welcome Bay, Matua-Otūmoetai, Bethlehem, Tauriko and Te Papa) and one Māori ward (Te Awanui, covering the entire city).

Council elections are usually held every three years, most recently in 2024. The next local election for Tauranga is scheduled for 2028.

In December 2020, the Minister of Local Government Nanaia Mahuta announced that, due to alleged "dysfunction" within the elected council, the council would be replaced by commissioners until the 2022 local elections. However, then Tauranga MP Simon Bridges said the appointment of commissioners was unnecessary and a "dramatic and draconian step." An independent review by law firm Russell McVeagh found that Mahuta's decision may have been unlawful. Her decision to reappoint the crown commission for a second term in 2022 through to July 2024 was subject to a legal review by Dentons Kensington Swan who found her decision was challengeable on the grounds of unlawfulness and unreasonableness.

== Economy ==
Much of the countryside surrounding Tauranga is horticultural land, used to grow a wide range of fresh produce for both domestic consumption and export. There are many kiwifruit and avocados orchards as well as other crops.

The Port of Tauranga is New Zealand's largest export port. It is a regular stop for both container ships and luxury cruise liners.

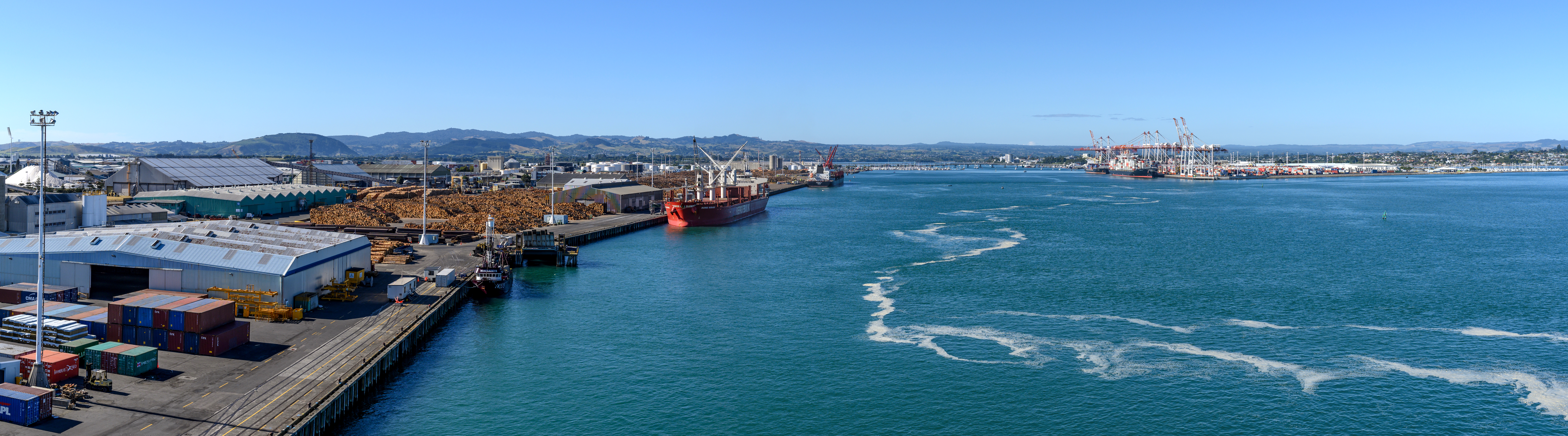
Port of Tauranga on the Mount Maunganui side, looking south.

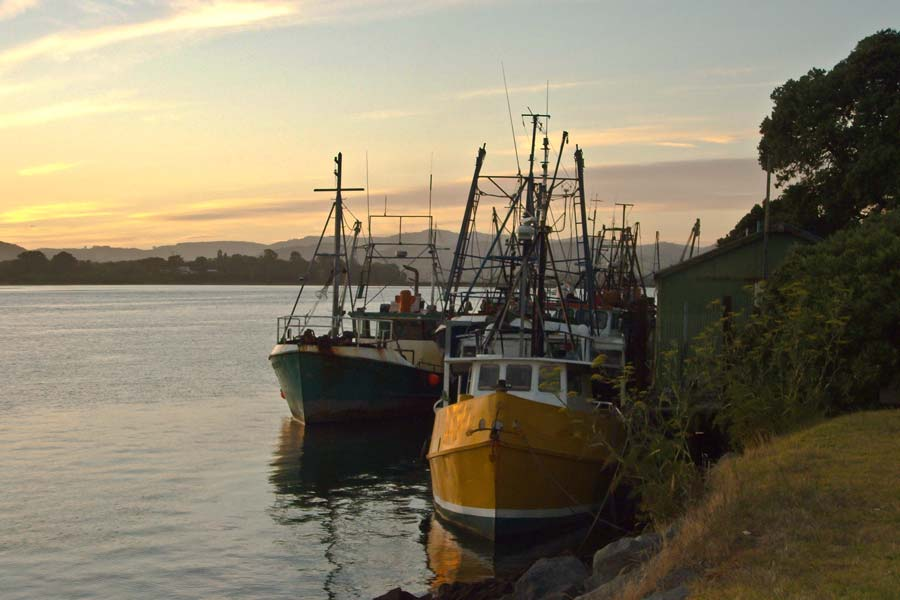
Tauranga harbour

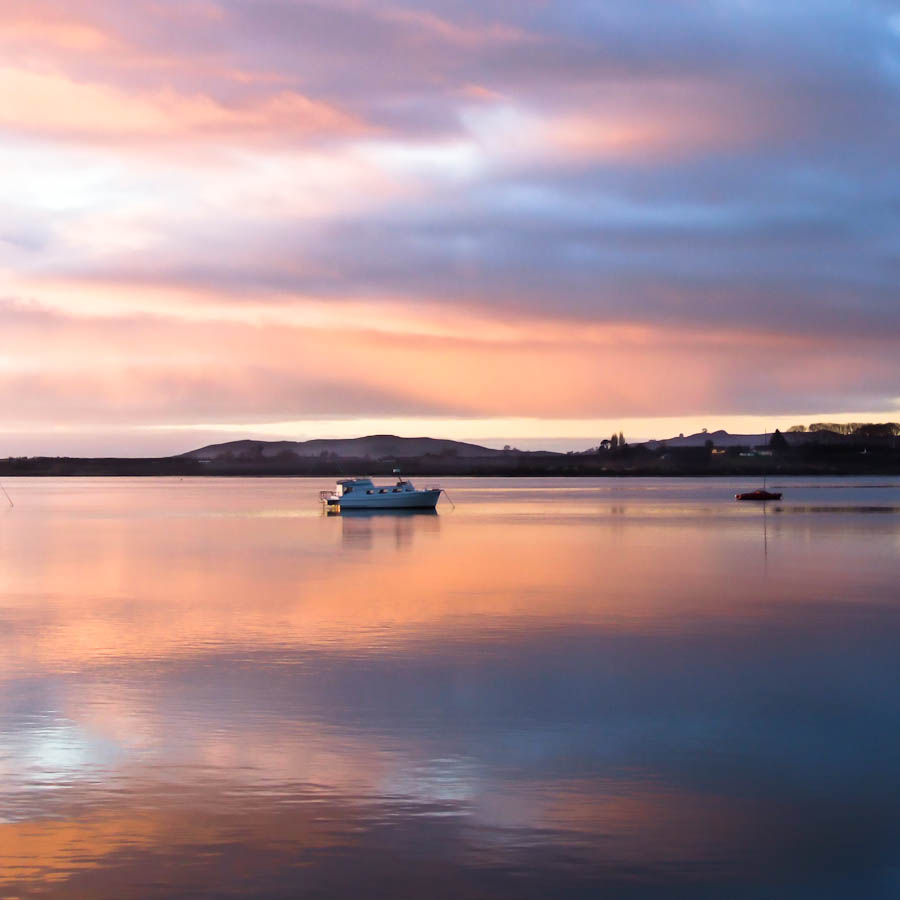
Picturesque sunrise over the Tauranga harbour

Tauranga's main shopping malls are Bayfair, in Mount Maunganui and Tauranga Crossing in Tauriko. Most of the city's shopping centres are located in the suburbs. They include Fraser Cove, Tauranga Crossing, Bethlehem Town Centre, Papamoa Plaza, Fashion Island, Bayfair Shopping Centre, Bay Central and Greerton Village.

Tauranga has the following business innovation centres

- The Kollective
- Newnham Park

The following companies have their head office in Tauranga:

- Ballance Agri-Nutrients
- Brother NZ
- C3 Limited
- Craigs Investment Partners
- Dominion Salt
- Genera Biosecurity
- Kiwi Bus Builders
- Port of Tauranga
- Shuzi New Zealand Limited
- Tidy International
- Trimax Mowing Systems
- Manawa Energy
- UNO Magazine
- Zespri International

== Arts and culture ==
=== Religion ===
A wide variety of faiths are practised, including Christianity, Hinduism, Buddhism, Islam, Sikhism, Taoism and Judaism. There are many denominations of Christianity including Pentecostal, Methodist, Presbyterian, Roman Catholic, Exclusive Brethren, Baptist, The Church of Jesus Christ of Latter-day Saints (LDS Church) and Jacobite Syrian Christian Church.

Religious affiliations in Tauranga City
Religion	Affiliated
No religion	82,131
Christianity	47,799
Other Religions, Beliefs and Philosophies	5,010
Māori religions, beliefs and philosophies	2,916
Hinduism	2,307
Buddhism	939
Islam	669
Spiritualism and New Age religions	588
Judaism	120

=== Events ===
The National Jazz Festival takes place in Tauranga every Easter. New Year celebrations at the Mount in Mount Maunganui are one of Tauranga's main events, bringing people from all around the country. In 2014 Tauranga City Council granted permission for an annual Sikh parade to celebrate Guru Gobind Singh's birthday. 2500 people took part in 2014, while in 2015, the number increased to 3500.

=== Sports ===
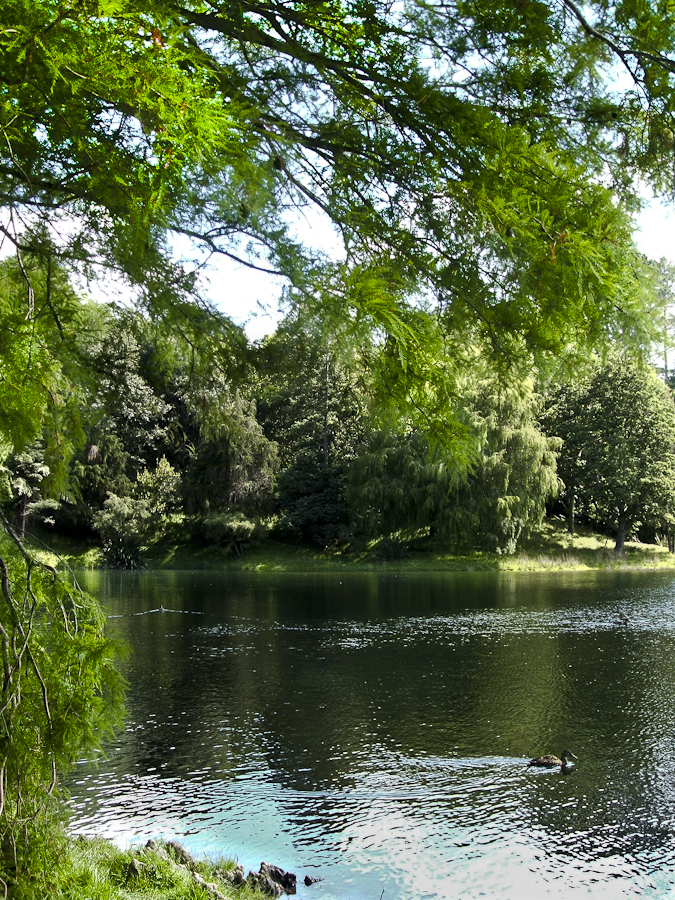
McLaren Falls Park, on the outskirts of Tauranga

Tauranga has a large stadium complex in the Mount Manganui suburb, Baypark Stadium, rebuilt in 2001 after a similar complex closed in 1995. It hosts speedway events during summer and rugby matches in winter.

Tauranga is the home to two rowing clubs – Tauranga Rowing Club in Memorial Park and Bay of Plenty Coast Rowing Club at the picturesque Wairoa River. Both clubs have had successful NZ representation over the years.

Tauranga is home to Tauranga City AFC, whose men's first team competes in the Northern League, the northern regional phase of the New Zealand National League.

Tauranga and Wharepai Domains are the city's premier parks for athletics and also host cricket, football, rugby and touch rugby clubs.

Tauranga also has a Hockey Association, separate from the Regional Bay of Plenty body, which represents the city in domestic tournaments.

== City facilities and attractions ==
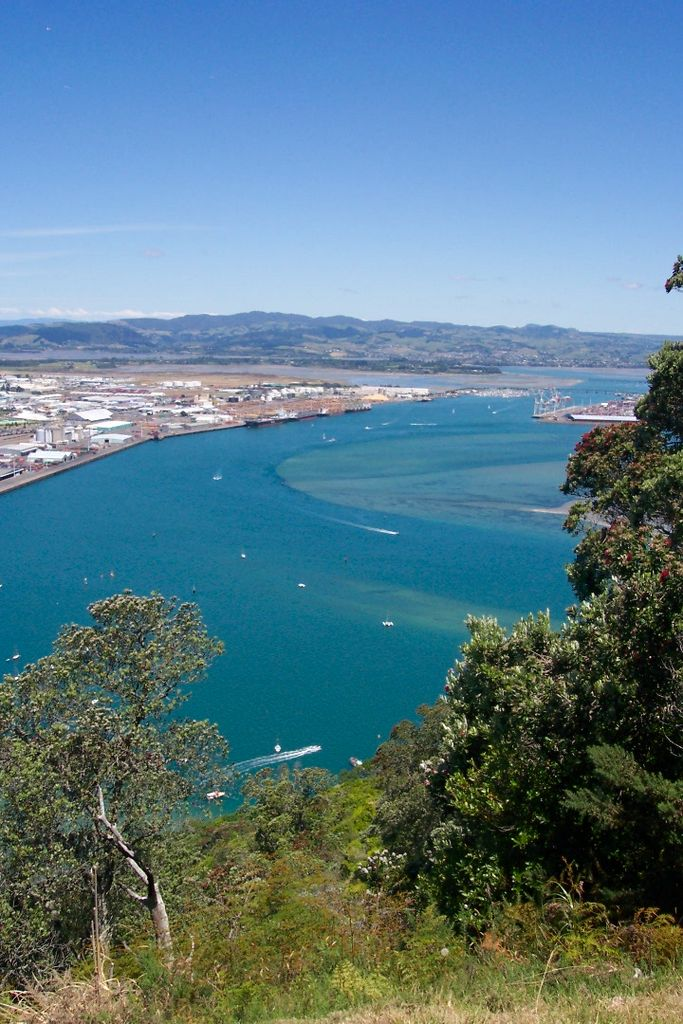
View over Greater Tauranga, taken from the top of Mauao

Greater Tauranga is a lifestyle and tourism destination. It features many natural attractions and scenery ranging from the beaches and harbour environments to bush-clad mountains with waterfalls and lakes.

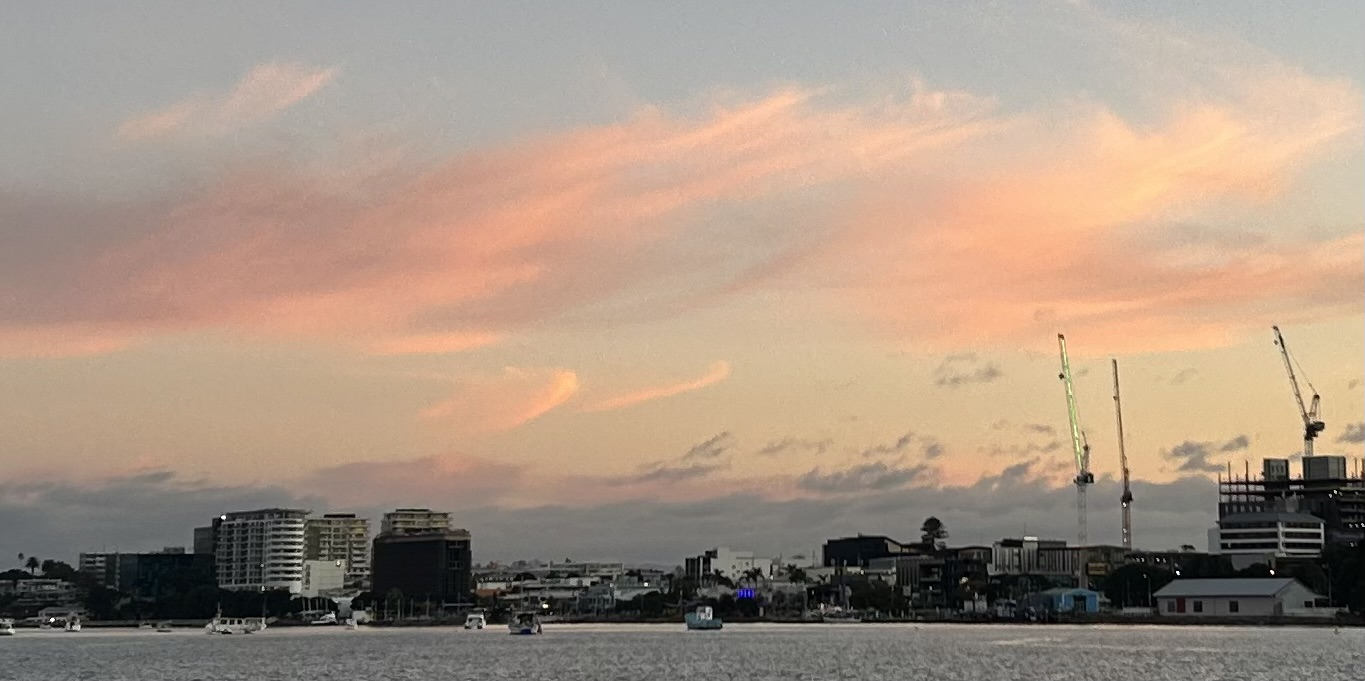
View of The Strand, looking across Tauranga Harbour 2026

The Tauranga Art Gallery opened in 2007 in a former Bank of New Zealand building that was renovated as a public art gallery.

Baycourt Community & Arts Centre opened in 1983 and includes the 582-seat Addison Theatre as well as the flexible X Space.

Aviation interests are served with the Classic Flyers Museum and the Gyrate Flying Club where you can experience flying a modern gyroplane; the "motorbike of the sky".

Memorial Park is an 11-hectare harbourfront park between 7th and 11th Avenues, with playgrounds, sports fields and community facilities. The Te Puna Quarry Park has become a regional attraction, known for being converted from a disused quarry into a community park.

Due to the temperate climate, outdoor activities are very popular, including golf, tramping (hiking), mountain biking and white water rafting. The Bay of Plenty coastline has miles of golden sandy beaches, and watersports are very popular, including swimming, surfing, fishing, diving, kayaking and kitesurfing. Tourists also enjoy dolphin-watching on specially run boat trips.

The coastal suburb Papamoa and neighbouring Mount Maunganui are some of the more affluent areas in Tauranga. The region's beaches attract swimmers, surfers, kayakers and kitesurfers throughout the year.

Tauranga has many outlying islands and reefs that make it a notable tourist destination point for travelling scuba divers and marine enthusiasts. Extensive marine life diversity is available to scuba divers all year round. Water temperatures range from 12 degrees Celsius in winter to 22–24 degrees Celsius in summer. Tauranga houses two professional dive instructor training centres, training NAUI, PADI and SSI dive leader systems.

== Infrastructure ==
=== Hospitals ===
Tauranga Hospital is a public secondary regional hospital located in Tauranga South, with 360 beds including neonatal, geriatric, surgical, maternity and mental health care. It provides elective and emergency healthcare across medical, surgical, paediatric, obstetric, gynaecological and psychiatric services. The main tertiary referral centre for Tauranga Hospital is Waikato Hospital, located in Hamilton. As the site of the Bay of Plenty Clinical School, Tauranga Hospital provides training to medical students from the University of Auckland, as well as selective and elective placements for nursing and midwifery students.

Grace Hospital is Tauranga's only private specialist surgical hospital, located in Oropi. It accommodates 6 operating theatres, 48 inpatient beds, a two-bed HDU, a procedure room for minor surgery and two procedure rooms for endoscopy.

=== Utilities ===
Powerco operates the local distribution network in the city, with electricity supplied from Transpower's national grid at three substations: Greerton, Kaitemako and Matapihi.

Natural gas arrived in Tauranga in 1982, following the completion of the high-pressure pipeline from the Maui pipeline near Te Awamutu to the city, now operated by First Gas. First Gas also operates the gas distribution network within the city.

From 24 October 2024, the Tauranga City Council began fluoridating the city's water supply in response to a directive from the Director-General of Health.

== Transport ==
Tauranga City Council is currently responsible for approximately 530 km of roads, 700 km of footpaths, cycle ways and access ways.

Tauranga City Council also has a bit of work under way with their Transportation and Roads strategy. Their aim for the future to change current travel behaviour from a focus on private cars to more sustainable modes such as buses, cycling and walking.

=== Air ===
Tauranga Airport has three direct destinations—Auckland, Wellington and Christchurch—with regular Air New Zealand services on all three routes. Sunair is based in Tauranga, operating a fleet of light aircraft. Sunair operates from Tauranga Airport to Whangarei, Claris, Whitianga and Mōtītī Island. Barrier Air also operates from Tauranga to Great Barrier Island.

=== Rail ===
Tauranga has no passenger rail network. It is a busy freight rail hub due to distribution from the Port of Tauranga. Tauranga railway station was the main passenger station from 1924 to 1986, and was served by the Kaimai Express from 1991 to 2001.

=== Bus ===
Public bus services are provided through the Bayhopper network, which connects Tauranga City with Mount Maunganui, Pāpāmoa, Bayfair, Bethlehem, Welcome Bay, Ōhauiti and other parts of the urban area. Bay Hopper buses depart the central stops in Tauranga's CBD, Ohauiti, Mount Maunganui and Bayfair every 15 minutes, with the routes to Papamoa and Greerton half-hourly. Bee Cards were introduced for fares on 27 July 2020.

The city is also a waypoint for bus travel between cities, with the Bay Hopper, and Intercity having a daily schedule.

=== Sea ===
Tauranga has a passenger ferry service that transports passengers from Tauranga CBD to Mount Maunganui's Salisbury wharf. It is a 2-Way service that costs $15 each way.

== Education ==
Tauranga is home to the Bay of Plenty Tertiary Education Partnership, made up of:

- Toi Ohomai Institute of Technology
- The University of Waikato
- Te Whare Wānanga o Awanuiārangi

The University of Waikato's purpose-built Tauranga campus opened in 2019; before that, the university shared facilities with Toi Ohomai Institute of Technology in the Bay of Plenty.

Tauranga's secondary schools are:

- Tauranga Boys' College, with about 2100 boys.
- Tauranga Girls' College, with nearly 1500 girls.
- Otumoetai College, with nearly 1900 students.
- Bethlehem College, a state integrated Christian school offering kindergarten and Year 1–13, with around 1500 students.
- Aquinas College a state integrated coeducational Catholic school founded in 2003 for Years 7–13, with around 800 students.
- Mount Maunganui College, a co-educational secondary school, with over 1500 students.
- Pāpāmoa College, co-educational secondary school opened in 2011 for years 7–13.
- Te Wharekura o Mauao, a co-educational wharekura-ā-iwi total immersion Māori secondary school for Years 7–13, founded in 2010, with around 200 students.
- Te Kura Kaupapa Māori o Te Kura Kōkiri, a co-educational kura kaupapa Māori total immersion school for Years 1–13, founded in 2000, with around 140 students.

ACG Tauranga provides education from Early Learning through Year 13 and offers the Cambridge curriculum through its primary and secondary programmes.

== Notable residents ==
- Corey Anderson – international cricketer
- Tim Balme – actor, director
- Trent Boult – international cricketer
- Tyler Boyd – footballer who represented the United States
- John Bracewell – international cricketer
- Simon Bridges – MP for Tauranga; former Leader of the New Zealand National Party; CEO of the Auckland Chamber of Commerce
- Peter Burling – America's Cup helmsman and Olympic medallist
- Moss Burmester – Olympic swimmer
- Sam Cane – international rugby player
- Tony Christiansen – former Paralympics, FESPIC Games and World Games medallist, professional speaker and Tauranga City Councillor
- Bob Clarkson – former Member of Parliament and property developer
- Aaron de Mey – makeup artist
- Dame Susan Devoy – former World Squash Champion
- Dame Lynley Dodd – award-winning author and illustrator, principally known for her children's picture books featuring Hairy Maclary and his friends
- Mahé Drysdale – Olympic rower
- Daniel Flynn – international cricketer
- Hilda Hewlett – pioneer aviator
- Gunnar Jackson – professional middleweight boxer
- Jess Johnson – artist
- Tanerau Latimer – former international rugby player
- Tony Lochhead – footballer
- Donald Vincent Merton (1939–2011), conservationist
- Todd Muller – MP for Bay of Plenty; former Leader of the New Zealand National Party
- Richard O'Brien – author of The Rocky Horror Show (spent his formative years here)
- Ny Oh – folk musician
- Phil Rudd – drummer for AC/DC
- Richie Stanaway – racing driver
- Andrew Stevenson – Olympic rower, Double World Champion Rower, NZ 1982 Sportsman of the Year
- Sir Gordon Tietjens – coach of the New Zealand national rugby sevens team
- Kane Williamson – international cricketer

== Past residents ==
- Kathleen Hawkins – known as the "Pioneer Poet"
- Les Munro – Dambusters veteran
- Winston Peters – former MP for Tauranga, leader of NZ First, politician
- Stan Walker – R&B singer, former Australian Idol contestant and winner

== Sister cities ==
Tauranga is twinned with:

- Hitachi, Japan
- San Bernardino, United States
- Yantai, China
