= Tauriko =

Suburb of Tauranga, New Zealand

- Suburb
- Interactive map of Tauriko
- Coordinates: 37.741°S 176.096°E
- Country: New Zealand
- City: Tauranga
- Local authority: Tauranga City Council
- Electoral ward: Tauriko General Ward

Area
  - Land: 839 ha (2,070 acres)

Population (June 2025)
  - Total: 300
  - Density: 36/km^{2} (93/sq mi)

Bethlehem	Gate Pa
Tairiko	Greerton
	Pyes Pa

Tauriko is a suburb of Tauranga, in the Bay of Plenty Region of New Zealand's North Island.

According to Place Names of New Zealand by A. W. Reed and Peter Dowling, "Tauriko" is not a Māori name—the suburb was originally named Taurico after the Tauranga Rimu Company, with the spelling apparently altered to give the semblance of a Māori name.

== Demographics ==
Tauriko covers 8.39 km^{2} (3.24 sq mi) and had an estimated population of 300 as of June 2025, with a population density of 36 people per km^{2}. The statistical area was extended for the 2023 census as Tauranga's boundaries expand.

Historical population
Year	Pop.	±% p.a.
2006	195	—
2013	363	+9.28%
2018	351	−0.67%
2023	291	−3.68%
The 2006 population is for a smaller area of 4.82 km^{2}. Source:

Tauriko had a population of 291 in the 2023 New Zealand census, a decrease of 60 people (−17.1%) since the 2018 census, and a decrease of 72 people (−19.8%) since the 2013 census. There were 144 males and 144 females in 96 dwellings. 2.1% of people identified as LGBTIQ+. The median age was 38.5 years (compared with 38.1 years nationally). There were 57 people (19.6%) aged under 15 years, 51 (17.5%) aged 15 to 29, 150 (51.5%) aged 30 to 64, and 33 (11.3%) aged 65 or older.

People could identify as more than one ethnicity. The results were 87.6% European (Pākehā), 16.5% Māori, 3.1% Pasifika, 6.2% Asian, and 4.1% other, which includes people giving their ethnicity as "New Zealander". English was spoken by 93.8%, Māori by 2.1%, and other languages by 11.3%. No language could be spoken by 3.1% (e.g. too young to talk). The percentage of people born overseas was 18.6, compared with 28.8% nationally.

Religious affiliations were 35.1% Christian, 1.0% Māori religious beliefs, and 4.1% other religions. People who answered that they had no religion were 53.6%, and 6.2% of people did not answer the census question.

Of those at least 15 years old, 30 (12.8%) people had a bachelor's or higher degree, 144 (61.5%) had a post-high school certificate or diploma, and 57 (24.4%) people exclusively held high school qualifications. The median income was $44,800, compared with $41,500 nationally. 27 people (11.5%) earned over $100,000 compared to 12.1% nationally. The employment status of those at least 15 was 132 (56.4%) full-time, 30 (12.8%) part-time, and 9 (3.8%) unemployed.

== Education ==
Tauriko School is a co-educational state primary school for Year 1 to 8 students, with a roll of 247 as of July 2025. It opened in 1918 as The School of Cambridge Road. It moved to its current site in 1923, and changed its name to Tauriko School in 1929.
