= Greerton =

Suburb of Tauranga, New Zealand

- Suburb
- Interactive map of Greerton
- Coordinates: 37.728°S 176.131°E
- Country: New Zealand
- City: Tauranga
- Local authority: Tauranga City Council
- Electoral ward: Te Papa General Ward; Tauriko General Ward

Area
  - Land: 421 ha (1,040 acres)

Population (June 2025)
  - Total: 4,570
  - Density: 1,090/km^{2} (2,810/sq mi)

Bethlehem	Gate Pa	Merivale
Tauriko	Greerton	Poike
	Pyes Pa

Greerton is a major suburb of Tauranga, the largest city in the Bay of Plenty region of New Zealand. Greerton is named after Lieutenant-Colonel Henry Harpur Greer, commander of the British forces during the Battle of Gate Pā.

== Demographics ==
Greerton covers 4.21 km^{2} (1.63 sq mi) and had an estimated population of 4,570 as of June 2025, with a population density of 1,086 people per km^{2}.

Historical population
Year	Pop.	±% p.a.
2006	3,696	—
2013	3,735	+0.15%
2018	4,128	+2.02%
2023	4,272	+0.69%

Greerton had a population of 4,272 in the 2023 New Zealand census, an increase of 144 people (3.5%) since the 2018 census, and an increase of 537 people (14.4%) since the 2013 census. There were 2,025 males, 2,232 females, and 12 people of other genders in 1,722 dwellings. 3.4% of people identified as LGBTIQ+. There were 780 people (18.3%) aged under 15 years, 828 (19.4%) aged 15 to 29, 1,800 (42.1%) aged 30 to 64, and 864 (20.2%) aged 65 or older.

People could identify as more than one ethnicity. The results were 73.3% European (Pākehā); 21.4% Māori; 4.1% Pasifika; 14.7% Asian; 0.6% Middle Eastern, Latin American and African New Zealanders (MELAA); and 1.4% other, which includes people giving their ethnicity as "New Zealander". English was spoken by 95.4%, Māori by 4.1%, Samoan by 0.4%, and other languages by 13.2%. No language could be spoken by 2.5% (e.g. too young to talk). New Zealand Sign Language was known by 0.6%. The percentage of people born overseas was 23.6, compared with 28.8% nationally.

Religious affiliations were 30.6% Christian, 3.2% Hindu, 0.8% Islam, 1.8% Māori religious beliefs, 0.6% Buddhist, 0.4% New Age, and 4.1% other religions. People who answered that they had no religion were 51.3%, and 7.0% of people did not answer the census question.

Of those at least 15 years old, 660 (18.9%) people had a bachelor's or higher degree, 1,866 (53.4%) had a post-high school certificate or diploma, and 969 (27.7%) people exclusively held high school qualifications. 165 people (4.7%) earned over $100,000 compared to 12.1% nationally. The employment status of those at least 15 was 1,770 (50.7%) full-time, 441 (12.6%) part-time, and 75 (2.1%) unemployed.

Individual statistical areas
Name	Area (km^{2})	Population	Density (per km^{2})	Dwellings	Median age	Median income
Greerton South	2.81	672	239	270	38.5 years	$39,500
Greerton North	1.40	3,600	2,571	1,452	36.9 years	$38,200
New Zealand					38.1 years	$41,500

== History ==
It was originally a small village located several kilometres south of Tauranga but was swallowed up by urban development. A military village of 125 one acre lots, the Township of Greerton, was surveyed near Gate Pā. Military settlers were allowed a choice of one acre there or a quarter acre in Te Papa. Originally, very few settlers took up town sections in Greerton.

In 1864 the Tauranga campaign was fought in the neighbouring suburb of Gate Pā with Māori troops withdrawing through Greerton to Pyes Pa. The commanding officer was Henry Greer, and Greerton is named after him.

== Culture ==
The Greerton community celebrates the cherry blossom festival in the third week of September every year.

== Education ==
Greerton has two co-educational state primary schools: Greerton Village School – Te Kura o Maarawaewae, with a roll of 371 (as of July 2026), and Greenpark School, with a roll of 701. Greerton Village School, then called Greerton School, celebrated its centenary in 1976.

Greerton is also zoned for Tauranga Intermediate, Tauranga Boys' College and Tauranga Girls' College.

== Recreation ==
Tauranga Racecourse | Mārawaewae is situated on Cameron Road next to Tauranga Golf Course, at the southern end of Greerton Village.

Greerton also has several parks: Greerton Park, Liston Park, Moreland Fox Park, Pemberton Park and Yatton Park.
