= Gate Pa =

Suburb of Tauranga, New Zealand

- Suburb
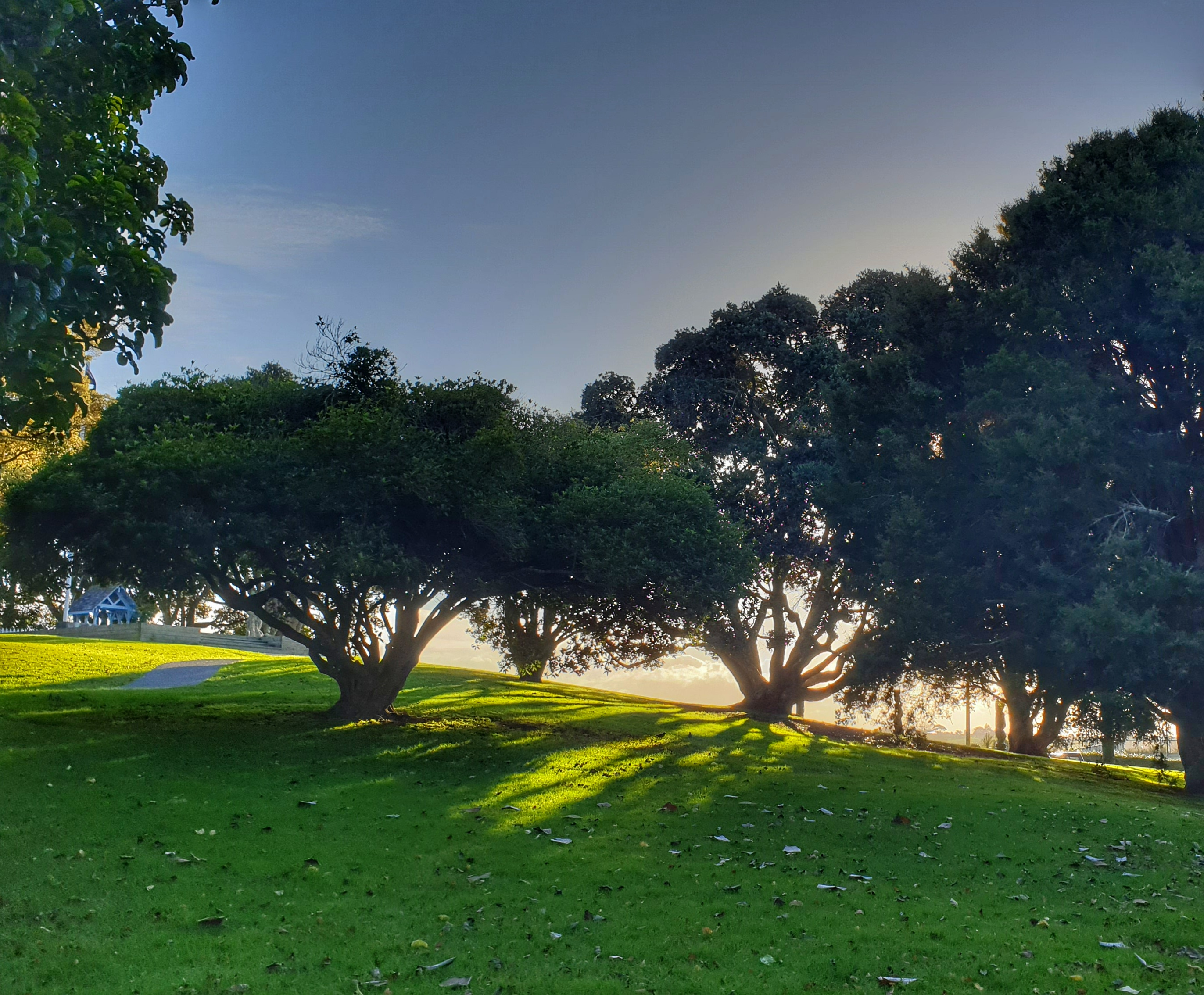
- Gate Pa Park
- Interactive map of Gate Pa
- Coordinates: 37.716°S 176.139°E
- Country: New Zealand
- City: Tauranga
- Local authority: Tauranga City Council
- Electoral ward: Te Papa General Ward

Area
  - Land: 176 ha (430 acres)

Population (June 2025)
  - Total: 4,100
  - Density: 2,300/km^{2} (6,000/sq mi)

Bethlehem	Judea	Tauranga South
	Gate Pa	Merivale
Tauriko	Greerton

Gate Pa or Gate Pā is a suburb of Tauranga, in the Bay of Plenty Region of New Zealand's North Island.

It is the location of the Battle of Gate Pā in the 1864 Tauranga campaign of the New Zealand Wars.

== Demographics ==
Gate Pa covers 1.76 km^{2} (0.68 sq mi) and had an estimated population of 4,100 as of June 2025, with a population density of 2,330 people per km^{2}.

Historical population
Year	Pop.	±% p.a.
2006	3,543	—
2013	3,318	−0.93%
2018	3,696	+2.18%
2023	3,843	+0.78%
The 2006 population is for a larger area of 2.08 km^{2}. Source:

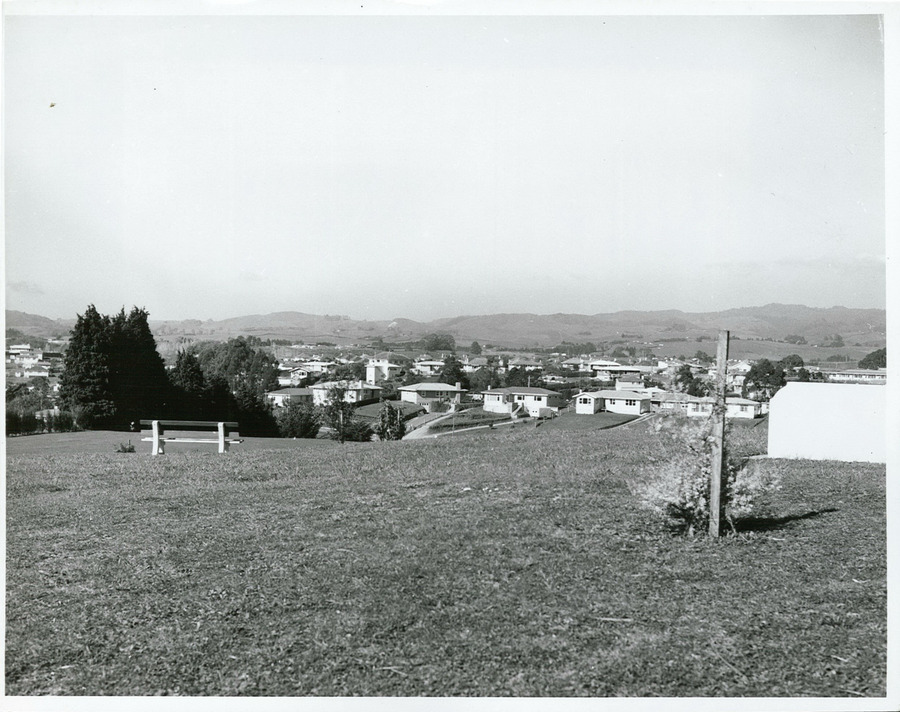
Gate Pa battle site, Cameron Road, Tauranga, 1967

Gate Pa had a population of 3,843 in the 2023 New Zealand census, an increase of 147 people (4.0%) since the 2018 census, and an increase of 525 people (15.8%) since the 2013 census. There were 1,929 males, 1,899 females, and 18 people of other genders in 1,299 dwellings. 3.4% of people identified as LGBTIQ+. The median age was 32.4 years (compared with 38.1 years nationally). There were 837 people (21.8%) aged under 15 years, 867 (22.6%) aged 15 to 29, 1,701 (44.3%) aged 30 to 64, and 441 (11.5%) aged 65 or older.

People could identify as more than one ethnicity. The results were 64.0% European (Pākehā); 31.5% Māori; 8.9% Pasifika; 14.1% Asian; 1.2% Middle Eastern, Latin American and African New Zealanders (MELAA); and 2.2% other, which includes people giving their ethnicity as "New Zealander". English was spoken by 95.6%, Māori by 7.2%, Samoan by 1.9%, and other languages by 12.1%. No language could be spoken by 2.4% (e.g. too young to talk). New Zealand Sign Language was known by 0.4%. The percentage of people born overseas was 24.4, compared with 28.8% nationally.

Religious affiliations were 30.4% Christian, 2.1% Hindu, 0.9% Islam, 3.7% Māori religious beliefs, 0.7% Buddhist, 0.5% New Age, and 4.1% other religions. People who answered that they had no religion were 50.0%, and 7.9% of people did not answer the census question.

Of those at least 15 years old, 513 (17.1%) people had a bachelor's or higher degree, 1,626 (54.1%) had a post-high school certificate or diploma, and 873 (29.0%) people exclusively held high school qualifications. The median income was $40,100, compared with $41,500 nationally. 120 people (4.0%) earned over $100,000 compared to 12.1% nationally. The employment status of those at least 15 was 1,644 (54.7%) full-time, 345 (11.5%) part-time, and 117 (3.9%) unemployed.

== Economy ==
The Gate Pa Shopping Centre opened in 2006 and covers 10,000 m². It has 450 carparks and 21 shops, including Mitre 10 Mega and Spotlight.

== Education ==
Gate Pā School is a co-educational state primary school for Year 1 to 6 students, with a roll of 382 as of July 2026. The school was opened as Tauranga South School in May 1951. It changed its name to Gate Pā School in 2001.

Tauranga Girls' College is a state girls' secondary school established in 1958, with a roll of 1,456. The school, previously part of Tauranga College, opened as a single-sex school in 1958.
