= Merivale, Tauranga =

Suburb of Tauranga, New Zealand

Merivale
- Suburb
- Interactive map of Merivale
- Coordinates: 37.724437°S 176.143858°E
- Country: New Zealand
- City: Tauranga
- Local authority: Tauranga City Council
- Electoral ward: Te Papa General Ward

Area
  - Land: 90 ha (220 acres)

Population (June 2025)
  - Total: 2,890
  - Density: 3,200/km^{2} (8,300/sq mi)

	Tauranga South
Gate Pa	Merivale	(Waimapu Estuary)
	Greerton	Poike

Merivale or Parkvale (Māori: Tutarawanga) is a suburb of Tauranga, in the Bay of Plenty Region of New Zealand's North Island.

The suburb was established after World War II, when six family farms, including the Merrivale Estate, were purchased by developers and subdivided.

Local residents and organisations refer to the area as Merivale. However, some maps refer to the area as Parkvale, and New Zealand Police and Fire and Emergency New Zealand dispatchers often follow these maps. The agencies officially recognise both names.

== Demographics ==
The statistical area of Yatton Park, which corresponds to Merivale, covers 0.90 km^{2} (0.35 sq mi) and had an estimated population of 2,890 as of June 2025, with a population density of 3,211 people per km^{2}.

Historical population
Year	Pop.	±% p.a.
2006	2,265	—
2013	2,238	−0.17%
2018	2,634	+3.31%
2023	2,712	+0.59%

Yatton Park had a population of 2,712 in the 2023 New Zealand census, an increase of 78 people (3.0%) since the 2018 census, and an increase of 474 people (21.2%) since the 2013 census. There were 1,380 males, 1,317 females, and 18 people of other genders in 864 dwellings. 3.1% of people identified as LGBTIQ+. The median age was 31.2 years (compared with 38.1 years nationally). There were 666 people (24.6%) aged under 15 years, 639 (23.6%) aged 15 to 29, 1,131 (41.7%) aged 30 to 64, and 276 (10.2%) aged 65 or older.

People could identify as more than one ethnicity. The results were 54.4% European (Pākehā); 41.5% Māori; 12.1% Pasifika; 12.8% Asian; 0.6% Middle Eastern, Latin American and African New Zealanders (MELAA); and 1.3% other, which includes people giving their ethnicity as "New Zealander". English was spoken by 94.7%, Māori by 10.7%, Samoan by 1.8%, and other languages by 13.4%. No language could be spoken by 2.5% (e.g. too young to talk). New Zealand Sign Language was known by 0.8%. The percentage of people born overseas was 21.6, compared with 28.8% nationally.

Religious affiliations were 29.4% Christian, 1.5% Hindu, 1.5% Islam, 6.3% Māori religious beliefs, 0.8% Buddhist, 0.6% New Age, and 4.6% other religions. People who answered that they had no religion were 49.8%, and 5.9% of people did not answer the census question.

Of those at least 15 years old, 294 (14.4%) people had a bachelor's or higher degree, 1,116 (54.5%) had a post-high school certificate or diploma, and 633 (30.9%) people exclusively held high school qualifications. The median income was $36,900, compared with $41,500 nationally. 72 people (3.5%) earned over $100,000 compared to 12.1% nationally. The employment status of those at least 15 was 1,074 (52.5%) full-time, 228 (11.1%) part-time, and 120 (5.9%) unemployed.

== Education ==
Merivale School is a co-educational state primary school for Year to 6 students, with a roll of 160 as of July 2026. It opened in 1957.
