= Oropi =

Rural community in the Bay of Plenty, New Zealand

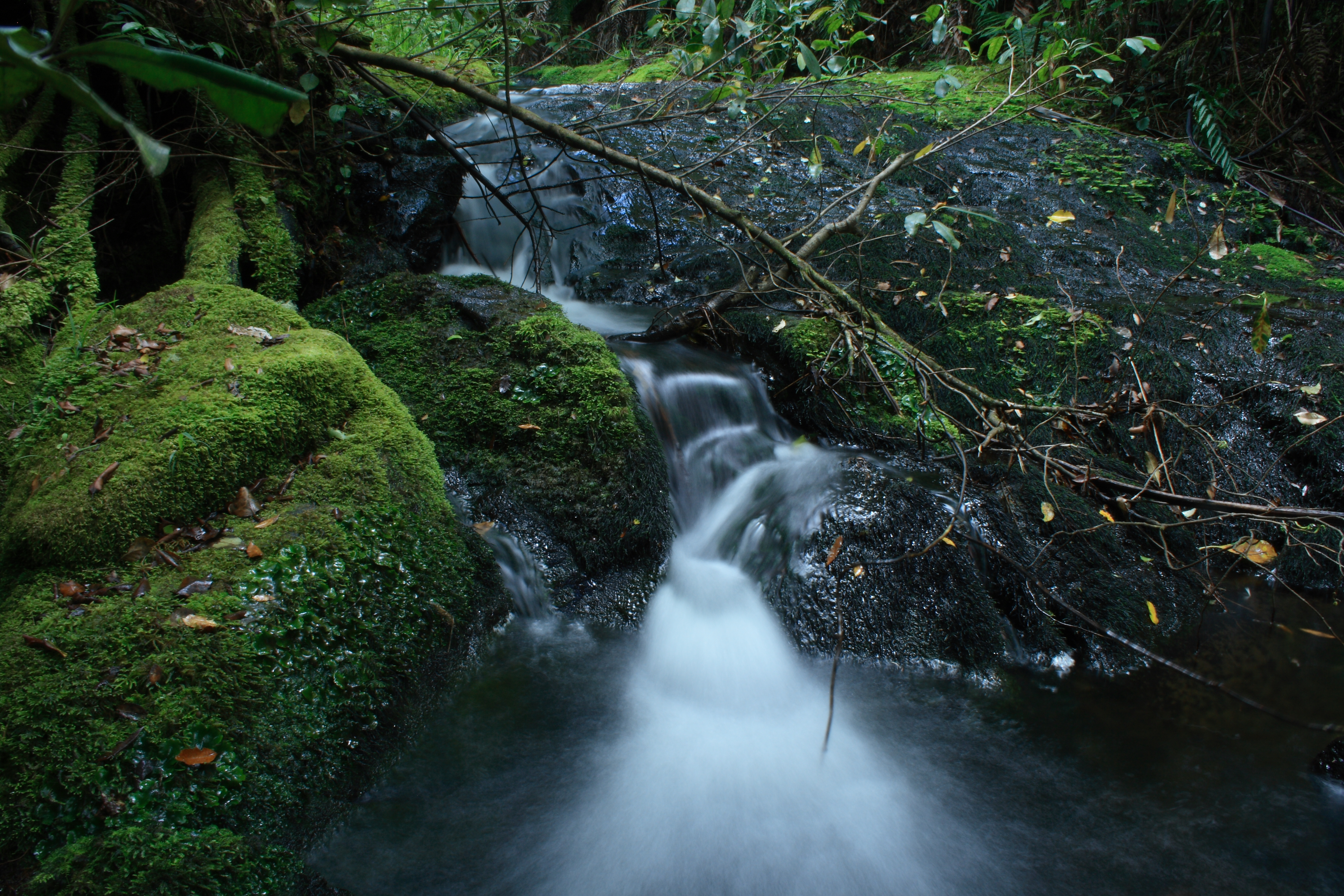
- Otanewainuku Reserve
- Interactive map of Oropi
- Coordinates: 37.839°S 176.158°E
- Country: New Zealand
- Region: Bay of Plenty
- Territorial authority: Western Bay of Plenty
- Ward: Kaimai
- Electorates: Rotorua; Waiariki (Māori)

Government
  - Territorial authority: Western Bay of Plenty District Council
  - Regional council: Bay of Plenty Regional Council
  - Mayor of Western Bay of Plenty: James Denyer
  - Rotorua MP: Todd McClay
  - Waiariki MP: Rawiri Waititi

Area
  - Total: 4.33 km^{2} (1.67 sq mi)

Population (2023 Census)
  - Total: 237
  - Density: 54.7/km^{2} (142/sq mi)

Oropi is a rural settlement located in the Bay of Plenty region of the North Island of New Zealand. It is located 20 kilometres (12 mi) south of Tauranga and 43 kilometres (27 mi) north of Rotorua.

Oropi is mainly a farming community of both agriculture and horticulture ranging from kiwifruit orchards to dairy farms. Recently there has been some subdivision of farms into lifestyle blocks to take advantage of views of the coastline towards the Coromandel Peninsula and islands in the Bay of Plenty including Karewa Island, Mayor Island (Tuhua) and Mōtītī Island.

Local facilities include a 9-hole golf course, hot pools, a paintball course and mountain bike tracks. The Oropi Memorial Hall and Community Centre includes a 170-square-metre (1,800 sq ft) auditorium. The nearby Otanewainuku Forest, managed by the Department of Conservation, includes three short public walking tracks.

== Etymology ==
It has been suggested that the word Oropi is the Māori language equivalent of Europe. This is derived from the 1860s when government forces were based in the area at the time of the Battle of Gate Pā. However, the New Zealand Ministry for Culture and Heritage gives a translation of "place of covering up" for Ōropi.

== Demographics ==
Oropi covers 4.33 km^{2} (1.67 sq mi). It is part of the Waiorohi statistical area.

Historical population for Oropi
| Year | Pop. | ±% p.a. |
|---|---|---|
| 2006 | 162 | — |
| 2013 | 165 | +0.26% |
| 2018 | 225 | +6.40% |
| 2023 | 237 | +1.04% |

Oropi had a population of 237 in the 2023 New Zealand census, an increase of 12 people (5.3%) since the 2018 census, and an increase of 72 people (43.6%) since the 2013 census. There were 111 males, 123 females, and 3 people of other genders in 81 dwellings. 2.5% of people identified as LGBTIQ+. The median age was 44.4 years (compared with 38.1 years nationally). There were 48 people (20.3%) aged under 15 years, 33 (13.9%) aged 15 to 29, 120 (50.6%) aged 30 to 64, and 33 (13.9%) aged 65 or older.

People could identify as more than one ethnicity. The results were 89.9% European (Pākehā); 13.9% Māori; 1.3% Asian; 1.3% Middle Eastern, Latin American and African New Zealanders (MELAA); and 2.5% other, which includes people giving their ethnicity as "New Zealander". English was spoken by 97.5%, Māori by 3.8%, and other languages by 5.1%. No language could be spoken by 2.5% (e.g. too young to talk). The percentage of people born overseas was 16.5, compared with 28.8% nationally.

Religious affiliations were 26.6% Christian, 1.3% Buddhist, 1.3% New Age, and 1.3% other religions. People who answered that they had no religion were 59.5%, and 8.9% of people did not answer the census question.

Of those at least 15 years old, 45 (23.8%) people had a bachelor's or higher degree, 105 (55.6%) had a post-high school certificate or diploma, and 36 (19.0%) people exclusively held high school qualifications. The median income was $49,200, compared with $41,500 nationally. 27 people (14.3%) earned over $100,000 compared to 12.1% nationally. The employment status of those at least 15 was 108 (57.1%) full-time, 30 (15.9%) part-time, and 3 (1.6%) unemployed.

=== Waiorohi statistical area ===
Waiorohi statistical area covers 152.66 km^{2} (58.94 sq mi) and had an estimated population of 2,860 as of June 2025, with a population density of 19 people per km^{2}.

Historical population for Waiorohi
| Year | Pop. | ±% p.a. |
|---|---|---|
| 2006 | 1,953 | — |
| 2013 | 2,190 | +1.65% |
| 2018 | 2,520 | +2.85% |
| 2023 | 2,739 | +1.68% |

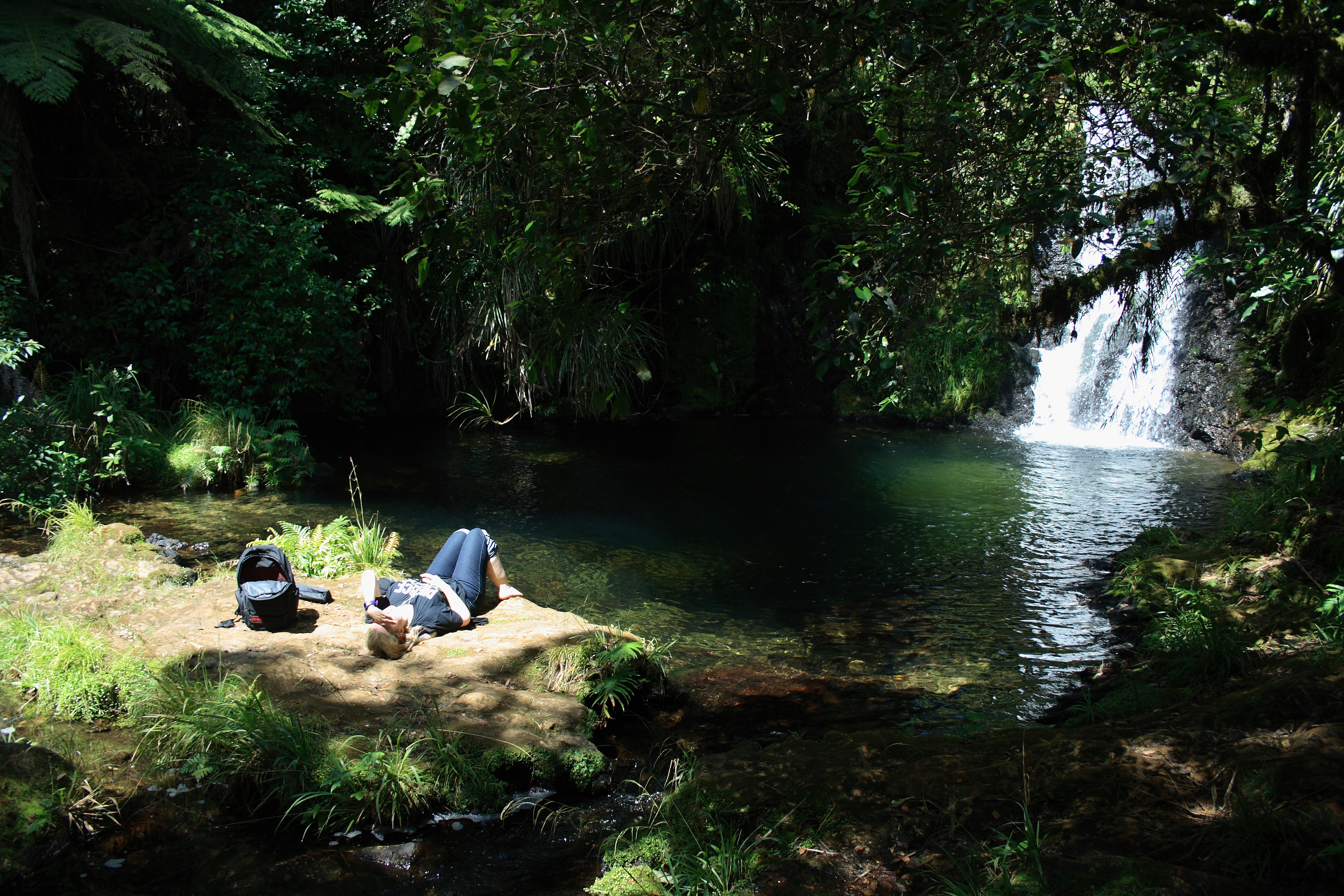
Whataroa Falls

Waiorohi had a population of 2,739 in the 2023 New Zealand census, an increase of 219 people (8.7%) since the 2018 census, and an increase of 549 people (25.1%) since the 2013 census. There were 1,368 males, 1,356 females, and 15 people of other genders in 909 dwellings. 2.1% of people identified as LGBTIQ+. The median age was 42.3 years (compared with 38.1 years nationally). There were 561 people (20.5%) aged under 15 years, 420 (15.3%) aged 15 to 29, 1,365 (49.8%) aged 30 to 64, and 390 (14.2%) aged 65 or older.

People could identify as more than one ethnicity. The results were 88.2% European (Pākehā); 16.1% Māori; 1.5% Pasifika; 4.1% Asian; 0.5% Middle Eastern, Latin American and African New Zealanders (MELAA); and 2.5% other, which includes people giving their ethnicity as "New Zealander". English was spoken by 97.8%, Māori by 3.9%, and other languages by 7.3%. No language could be spoken by 1.6% (e.g. too young to talk). New Zealand Sign Language was known by 0.2%. The percentage of people born overseas was 18.3, compared with 28.8% nationally.

Religious affiliations were 28.7% Christian, 0.2% Hindu, 0.2% Islam, 1.1% Māori religious beliefs, 0.3% Buddhist, 0.8% New Age, and 1.0% other religions. People who answered that they had no religion were 59.8%, and 7.9% of people did not answer the census question.

Of those at least 15 years old, 507 (23.3%) people had a bachelor's or higher degree, 1,266 (58.1%) had a post-high school certificate or diploma, and 402 (18.5%) people exclusively held high school qualifications. The median income was $44,300, compared with $41,500 nationally. 306 people (14.0%) earned over $100,000 compared to 12.1% nationally. The employment status of those at least 15 was 1,128 (51.8%) full-time, 396 (18.2%) part-time, and 36 (1.7%) unemployed.

== Education ==
Oropi School is a co-educational state primary school for Year 1 to 8 students, with a roll of 298 as of July 2026.

The school has a community garden and has converted a donated shipping container into an outdoor kitchen with a hand-painted forest mural on the outer wall.

Oropi School first opened in 1899 but closed in 1902. A school opened at Tururu (now Gluepot) in 1905. Once Oropi Hall was built later that year, it held classes three days a week in the hall and two days at Tururu. The school moved to Oropi Hall full time until 1934, when it moved to its own building on the current site.
