= Kaitemako =

Rural community in the Bay of Plenty, New Zealand

- Rural community
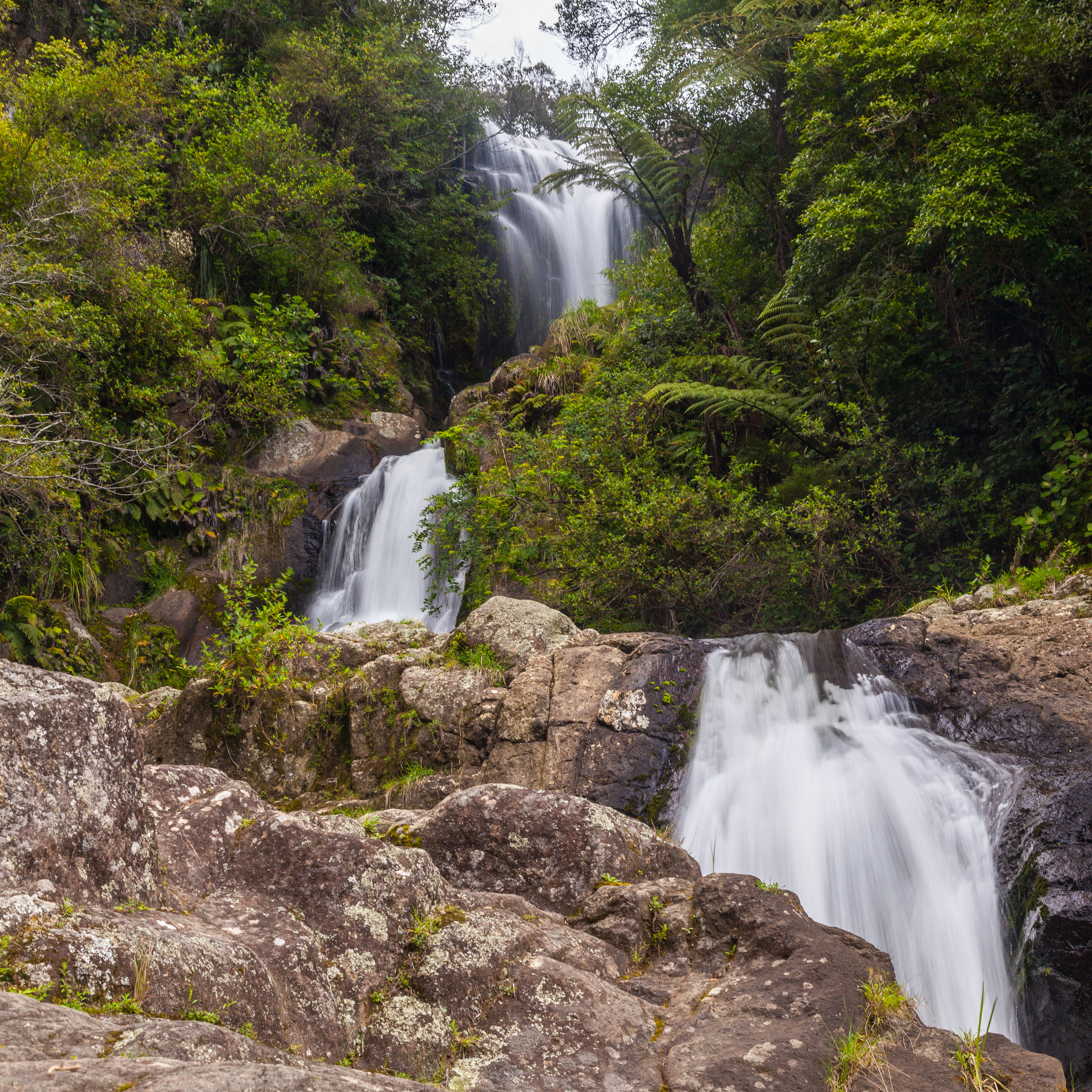
- Upper Kaiate Falls
- Interactive map of Kaitemako
- Coordinates: 37.8°S 176.2°E
- Country: New Zealand
- Region: Bay of Plenty
- Territorial authority: Western Bay of Plenty District
- Ward: Kaimai Ward
- Electorates: Rotorua; Waiariki (Māori)

Government
  - Territorial authority: Western Bay of Plenty District Council
  - Regional council: Bay of Plenty Regional Council
  - Mayor of Western Bay of Plenty: James Denyer
  - Rotorua MP: Todd McClay
  - Waiariki MP: Rawiri Waititi

Area
  - Total: 75.76 km^{2} (29.25 sq mi)

Population (June 2025)
  - Total: 1,920
  - Density: 25.3/km^{2} (65.6/sq mi)
- Postcode(s): 3173

Kaitemako is a rural area in the Western Bay of Plenty District and Bay of Plenty Region of New Zealand's North Island. The area includes the Kaitemako Stream catchment. The highest point is Pukunui at 364 metres. The Kaiate Falls (Te Rerekawau Falls) are a pair of waterfalls, with the lower fall being about 15 metres high.

== Demographics ==
Waitao statistical area, which was called Kaitemako before the 2023 census, covers 75.76 km^{2} (29.25 sq mi) and had an estimated population of 1,920 as of June 2025, with a population density of 25 people per km^{2}.

Historical population
Year	Pop.	±% p.a.
2006	1,341	—
2013	1,473	+1.35%
2018	1,752	+3.53%
2023	1,824	+0.81%

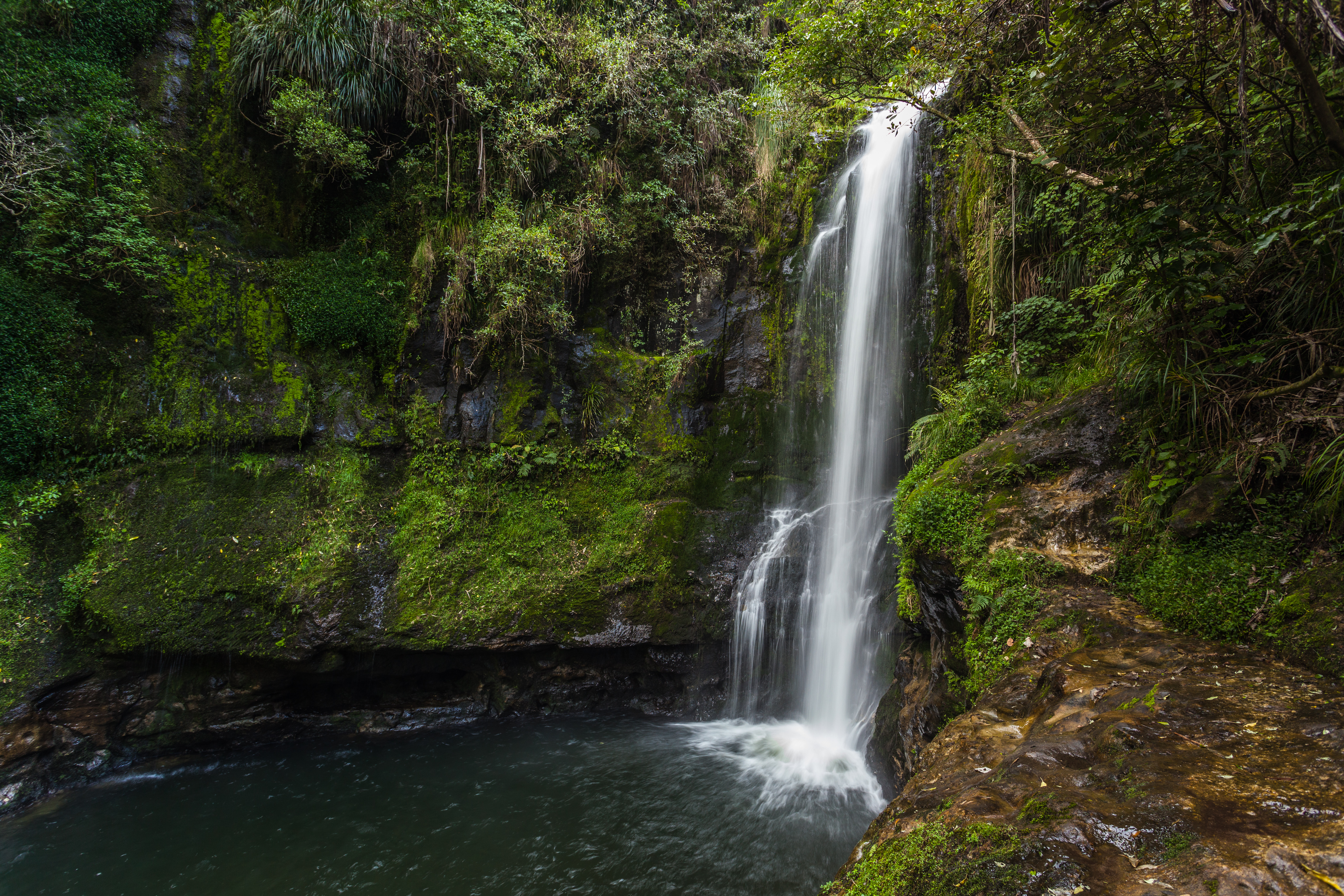
Lower Kaiate Falls

Waitao had a population of 1,824 in the 2023 New Zealand census, an increase of 72 people (4.1%) since the 2018 census, and an increase of 351 people (23.8%) since the 2013 census. There were 894 males, 924 females, and 6 people of other genders in 639 dwellings. 2.5% of people identified as LGBTIQ+. The median age was 45.0 years (compared with 38.1 years nationally). There were 339 people (18.6%) aged under 15 years, 264 (14.5%) aged 15 to 29, 921 (50.5%) aged 30 to 64, and 300 (16.4%) aged 65 or older.

People could identify as more than one ethnicity. The results were 82.9% European (Pākehā); 20.7% Māori; 1.3% Pasifika; 3.3% Asian; 1.3% Middle Eastern, Latin American and African New Zealanders (MELAA); and 3.9% other, which includes people giving their ethnicity as "New Zealander". English was spoken by 97.5%, Māori by 6.7%, Samoan by 0.2%, and other languages by 9.7%. No language could be spoken by 1.8% (e.g. too young to talk). New Zealand Sign Language was known by 0.3%. The percentage of people born overseas was 19.4, compared with 28.8% nationally.

Religious affiliations were 28.0% Christian, 0.2% Islam, 3.5% Māori religious beliefs, 0.7% Buddhist, 0.5% New Age, and 1.2% other religions. People who answered that they had no religion were 56.7%, and 9.2% of people did not answer the census question.

Of those at least 15 years old, 372 (25.1%) people had a bachelor's or higher degree, 834 (56.2%) had a post-high school certificate or diploma, and 282 (19.0%) people exclusively held high school qualifications. The median income was $38,900, compared with $41,500 nationally. 177 people (11.9%) earned over $100,000 compared to 12.1% nationally. The employment status of those at least 15 was 759 (51.1%) full-time, 294 (19.8%) part-time, and 27 (1.8%) unemployed.
