= Horrie =

Horrie is a masculine given name, typically used in Australia as a hypocorism (pet name) for Horace, as well as a surname. It may refer to:

== Given name ==
- Horrie Bannister (1900–1978), Australian rules footballer
- Horrie Bant (1882–1957), Australian rules footballer
- Horrie Brain (1885–1966), Australian rules footballer
- Horrie Bullen (1906–1961), Australian rules footballer
- Horrie Clover (1895–1984), Australian rules footballer
- Horrie Dargie (1917–1999), Australian musician
- Horrie Davis (1889–1960), Australian cricketer
- Horrie Dawson (1910–1982), Australian rules footballer
- Horrie Dick (1877–1930), Australian rules footballer
- Horrie Drane (1881–1965), Australian rules footballer
- Horrie Edmonds (1908–1975), Australian rules footballer
- Horrie Farmer (footballer, born 1888) (1888–1934), Australian rules footballer
- Horrie Farmer (footballer, born 1909), Australian rules footballer, son of the above
- Horrie Garrick (1918–1982), Australian politician
- Horrie Gorringe (1895–1994), Australian rules footballer
- Kevin Hastings (born 1957), Australian rugby league player nicknamed "Horrie"
- Horrie Jenkin (1893–1985), Australian rules footballer
- Horrie Jones (1888–1967), Australian rules footballer
- Horrie Jose (1893–1966), Australian rules footballer
- Horrie Kessey (1927–2015), Australian rugby league player
- Horrie Knight (1915–1990), Australian businessman and philanthropist
- Horrie Lyons (1876–1921), Australian rules footballer
- Horrie Mason (1903–1975), Australian rules footballer
- Horrie Miller (aviator) (1893–1980), Australian aviation pioneer
- Horrie Miller (rugby league) (1882–1967), Australian rugby league footballer and administrator
- Horrie Pearce (1886–1936), Australian rules footballer
- Horrie Pope (1887–1949), Australian rules footballer
- Horrie Quinton (1878–1912), Australian rules footballer
- Horrie Rice (1872–1950), Australian tennis player
- Horrie Riley (1902–1970), Australian rules footballer
- Horrie Seden (born 1946), Australian darts player
- Horrie Stanway (1908–1994), Australian rules footballer
- Horrie Stevens (1912–1940), Australian rules footballer
- Horrie Stewart (1871–1951), Australian rules footballer
- Horrie Toole (1931–2023), Australian rugby league player
- Horrie Trinder (1875–1956), Australian rules footballer
- Horrie Watt (1891–1969), Australian rugby league player
- Horrie Webster (1888–1949), Australian rules footballer
- Horrie Weeks (1895–1962), Australian rules footballer
- Horrie White (1892–1959), Australian rules footballer
- Horrie the Wog Dog (1941–?), terrier and unofficial mascot of Australia's 2/1st Machine Gun Battalion

== Surname ==
- Chris Horrie, British journalist
- Erik Horrie (born 1979), Australian adaptive rower and wheelchair basketball player

== See also ==
- Horizontal Falls, nicknamed the "Horries", a natural phenomenon in Western Australia
- Hori (disambiguation)
- Horry (disambiguation)
