= Hori (given name) =

Hori or Hōri is a given name. It was the name of various Ancient Egyptian officials. In the Māori language, it is a transliteration of the name George. Hori was later used as a slur against people of Māori descent. Notable people with the name include:

== People in Ancient Egypt ==
- Sewadjkare Hori, late 13th dynasty Pharaoh, also known as Hori II
- Hori (High Priest of Osiris) Son of Wennenufer and High Priest of Osiris during the reign of Ramesses II (19th dynasty)
- Hori I (High Priest of Ptah), a High Priest of Ptah at the very end of the reign of Ramesses II
- Hori (high priest), a High Priest of Anhur during the reign of Ramesses II
- Hori II (vizier), a Vizier during the 19th and 20th dynasties of Ancient Egypt
- Hori I (Viceroy of Kush), a Viceroy of Kush under Siptah
- Hori II (Viceroy of Kush), a son of Hori I who also served as Viceroy of Kush
- Hori, an ancient Egyptian author who wrote Papyrus Anastasi I

== People in New Zealand ==
- Hori Ahipene, New Zealand actor, director, and playwright
- Hōri Kerei Taiaroa (died 1905), New Zealand politician
- Hōri Kīngi Te Ānaua (died 1868), New Zealand Māori leader
- Hori Kingi Tupaea (died 1881), New Zealand tribal leader
- Hōri Nēpia (1905–1986), New Zealand international rugby footballer
- Hōri Ngata (1919–1989), Ngāti Porou farmer, railway worker, workers' camp supervisor, accountant, and lexicographer
- Hōri Ngātai (died 1912), New Zealand warrior, farmer, and orator
- Hori Pitama (1840–1915), New Zealand politician
- Hōri Pukehika (1851–1932), New Zealand Māori leader and woodcarver
- Hori Tawhiti, New Zealand politician
- Hōri Tūpaea (1879–1944), New Zealand tribal leader and farmer

== Other people ==
- Hori, name of two minor Hebrew Bible figures

== See also ==
- Hori (surname)
- Hori
