= Iuty =

Vizier of ancient Egypt

- Vizier of the North
- Dynasty: 20th dynasty?
- Burial: tomb at Bubastis
- Children: Ay

Iuty was an ancient Egyptian vizier presumably of the Late New Kingdom whose family tomb made up of bricks was discovered in December 1964 by the Egyptian archaeologist Shafik Farid, in the so-called "Cemetery of the Nobles" of Bubastis (Tell Basta). The tomb was situated near to the family tombs of Hory I and Hory II, two viceroys of Kush during the 20th Dynasty. Iuty's tomb architecture has remained unpublished, but some objects of the burial equipment including faience and calcite shabtis as well as a calcite model scribe's palette have recently been studied. Iuty cannot be dated precisely at present; but according to the German Egyptologist Jan Moje, he may have officiated during the 20th Dynasty. A calcite canopic jar (representing Duamutef) belonging to Iuty's son, the high-priest of Bastet, Ay, was also found in the same tomb. Before this discovery Iuty was only known from a few objects seen at the beginning of the 20th century on the art market in Cairo.
