= Shigeyuki =

- Gender: Male

Origin
- Origin: Japanese
- Meaning: Different meanings depending on the kanji used

Shigeyuki (written: 茂之, 茂幸 or 重之) is a masculine Japanese given name. Notable people with the name include:

- Shigeyuki Dejima (出島 茂幸; born 1982), Japanese speed skater
- Shigeyuki Dobashi (土橋 茂之; born 1970), Japanese boxer
- Shigeyuki Furuki (古城 茂幸; born 1976), Japanese baseball player
- Shigeyuki Goto (後藤 茂之; born 1955), Japanese politician
- Shigeyuki Hori, Japanese automotive engineer
- Shigeyuki Kihara, New Zealand artist
- Shigeyuki Kojima (小島 茂之; born 1979), Japanese sprinter
- Minamoto no Shigeyuki (源 重之; died 1000), Japanese poet
- Shigeyuki Tomita (富田 茂之; born 1953), Japanese politician
