= Hori =

Hori may refer to:

== Other people and fictional characters ==
- Hori (given name)
- Hori (surname), a Japanese surname, including a list of people and fictional characters
- Hori (entertainer) (Hirohito Hori (堀 裕人), born 1977), Japanese impressionist
- Hori Horibata (born 1993), Filipino politician
- Hori, a fictional character from the novel Godaan by Premchand

== Places ==
- Höri, a municipality in Switzerland
- Hori, Zahedan, a village in Iran
- Hori River, Nagoya, Japan

== Other uses ==
- Hori (music), a genre of semiclassical Indian music
- Hori (slur), an ethnic slur used against people of Māori descent
- 8500 Hori, an asteroid
- Hori (company), a Japanese manufacturer of video game peripherals

== See also ==
- Hori hori, a Japanese multi-purpose knife
- Hory, a village in the Czech Republic
