= Hori (surname) =

Hori (written: 堀 or 保利) is a Japanese surname.

== People with the name ==
Notable people with the surname include:

- Hori (entertainer) (Hirohito Hori (堀 裕人), born 1977), Japanese impressionist
- Akira Hori (堀 晃; born 1944), Japanese writer
- Ayano Hori (堀 彩乃; born 1993), Japanese professional shogi player
- Chiemi Hori (堀 ちえみ; born 1967), Japanese singer, actress, and entertainer
- Eriko Hori (堀 絵梨子; born 1988), better known by her stage name Pile, Japanese singer, actress and voice actress
- Fumiko Hori (堀 文子; 1918–2019), Japanese artist
- Hori Hidemasa (堀 秀政; 1553–1590), Japanese samurai
- Hideyuki Hori (堀 秀行; born 1954), Japanese voice actor
- Hiraku Hori (堀 啓; born 1982), Japanese kickboxer
- Hiroshi Hori (堀 寛; born 1949), Japanese ice hockey player
- Junko Hori (堀 絢子; born 1942), Japanese actress and voice actress
- Katsunosuke Hori (堀 勝之祐; born 1941), Japanese actor
- Kento Hori (堀 健人; born 1982), Japanese footballer
- Koichi Hori (堀 幸一; born 1969), Japanese baseball player
- Kosuke Hori (保利 耕輔; born 1934), Japanese politician
- Mika Hori (堀 珠花; born 1992), Japanese ice hockey player
- Miona Hori (堀 未央奈; born 1996), Japanese idol and model, member of Japanese girl group Nogizaka46
- Mizuki Hori (堀 瑞輝; born 1998), Japanese baseball player
- Hori Naotora (堀 直虎; 1836–1868), Japanese samurai
- Ryūjo Hori (堀 柳女; 1897–1984), Japanese dollmaker
- Shigeyuki Hori, Japanese automotive engineer
- Takafumi Hori (堀 孝史; born 1967), Japanese footballer and manager
- Tatsuo Hori (堀 辰雄; 1904–1953), Japanese writer, poet and translator
- Tatsuya Hori (堀 達也; 1935–2026), Japanese politician
- Teikichi Hori (堀 悌吉; 1883–1959), Imperial Japanese Navy admiral
- Yoichi Hori, Japanese automotive executive
- Yoshito Hori (堀 義人), Japanese chief executive
- Yukitoshi Hori (堀 之紀; born 1952), Japanese voice actor

== Fictional characters with the name ==
- Taizo Hori (掘 退蔵), main character from Dig Dug
- Susumu Hori (掘 進), main character from Mr. Driller
- Ataru Hori (掘 中), character from Mr. Driller
- Kyouko Hori (堀 京子), main character from Horimiya
- Masayuki Hori (堀 政行), character from Monthly Girls' Nozaki-kun
