= Toyota Prius (XW20) =

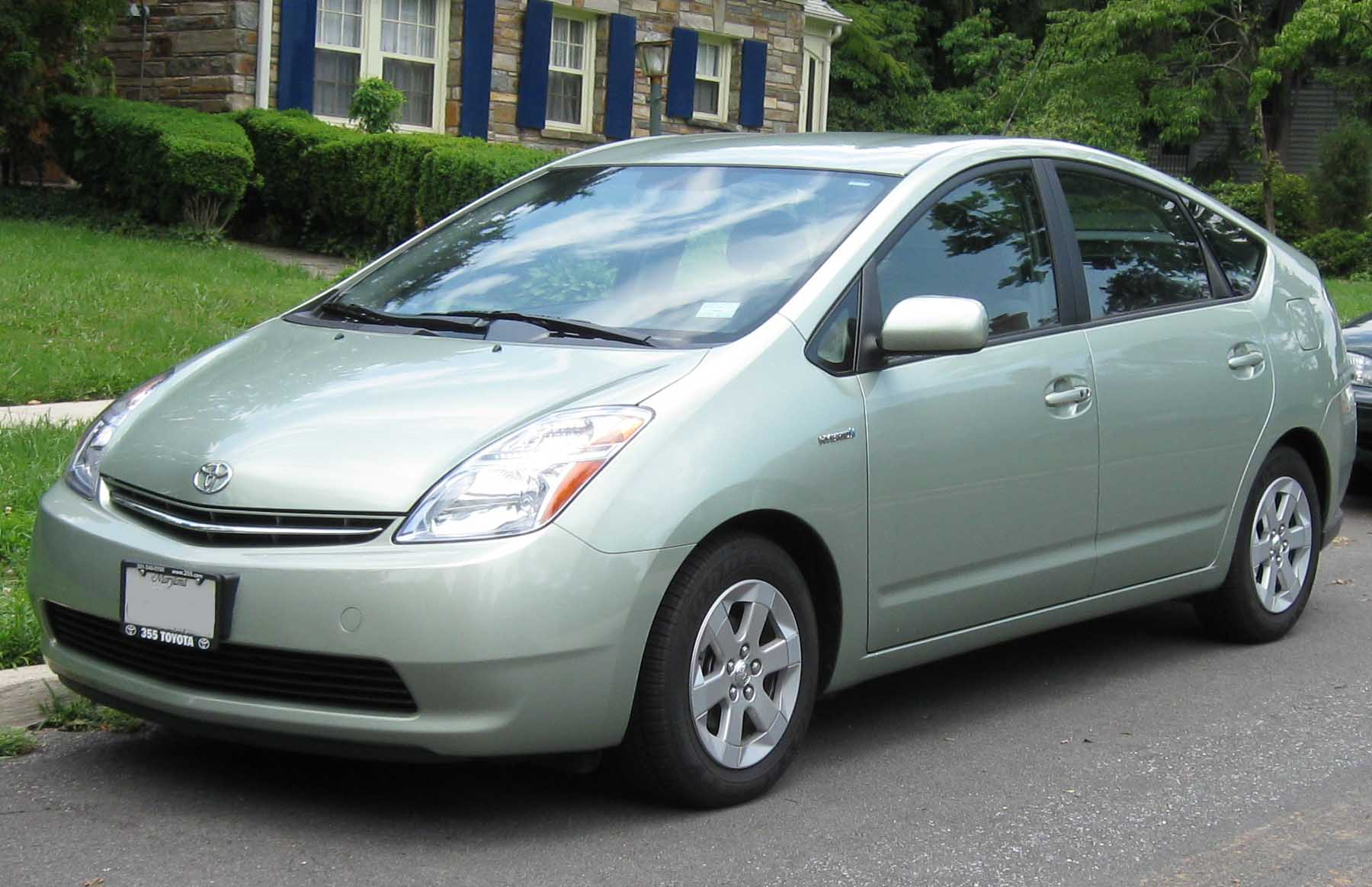

Overview
- Manufacturer: Toyota
- Production: 2003–2012 (Japan); 2005–2009 (China)
- Model years: 2004–2009 (North America)
- Assembly: Japan: Toyota, Aichi (Tsutsumi plant); Kariya, Aichi (Fujimatsu plant); China: Changchun, Jilin (SFTM)
- Designer: Hiroshi Okamoto (2001)

Body and chassis
- Class: Compact car
- Body style: 5-door liftback
- Layout: Front-engine, front-wheel-drive
- Platform: Toyota MC platform

Powertrain
- Engine: Toyota Hybrid System II; Gasoline: 1.5 L Atkinson Cycle 1NZ-FXE DOHC I4 VVT-i; 57 kW (76 hp) @ 5000 rpm; 115 N·m (85 lb·ft) @ 4200 rpm; Electric: 50 kW (67 hp) @ 1200 rpm; 400 N·m (295 lb·ft) @ 0 rpm; AT-PZEV; Hybrid system net horsepower: 110 hp (82 kW)
- Transmission: 1-speed planetary gear
- Hybrid drivetrain: Power-split hybrid

Dimensions
- Wheelbase: 2,700 mm (106.3 in)
- Length: 4,450 mm (175.2 in)
- Width: 1,725 mm (67.9 in)
- Height: 1,490 mm (58.7 in)
- Curb weight: 1,317 kg (2,903 lb)

Chronology
- Predecessor: Toyota Prius (XW10)
- Successor: Toyota Prius (XW30)

The Toyota Prius is a full series-parallel hybrid electric compact car developed and manufactured by the Toyota Motor Corporation. The second generation Prius had been completely redesigned with a kammback profile. The XW20 series represented the second generation of the Toyota Prius, replacing its XW10 predecessor. The United States Environmental Protection Agency (EPA) and California Air Resources Board (CARB) rated the Prius as among the cleanest vehicles sold in the United States based on smog forming and toxic emissions in 2008. Toyota sold about 1,192,000 units of the second generation Prius worldwide.

== Development ==
In 1999, Toyota began development on a second generation Prius under chief engineer Shigeyuki Hori. In 2001, Hiroshi Okamoto's exterior design was approved and frozen for production. In 2003, the Prius was completely redesigned as a compact liftback, with redistributed mechanical and interior space significantly increasing rear-seat legroom and luggage room. The 2004 Prius is even more environmentally-friendly than the 1997–2003 model (according to the EPA), and is 6 inches (150 mm) longer than the previous version. Its more aerodynamic Kammback body balances length and wind resistance resulting in a drag coefficient ( C_{d}) of 0.26. Chief engineer Shigeyuki Hori's development effort led to 530 patents filed for the vehicle.

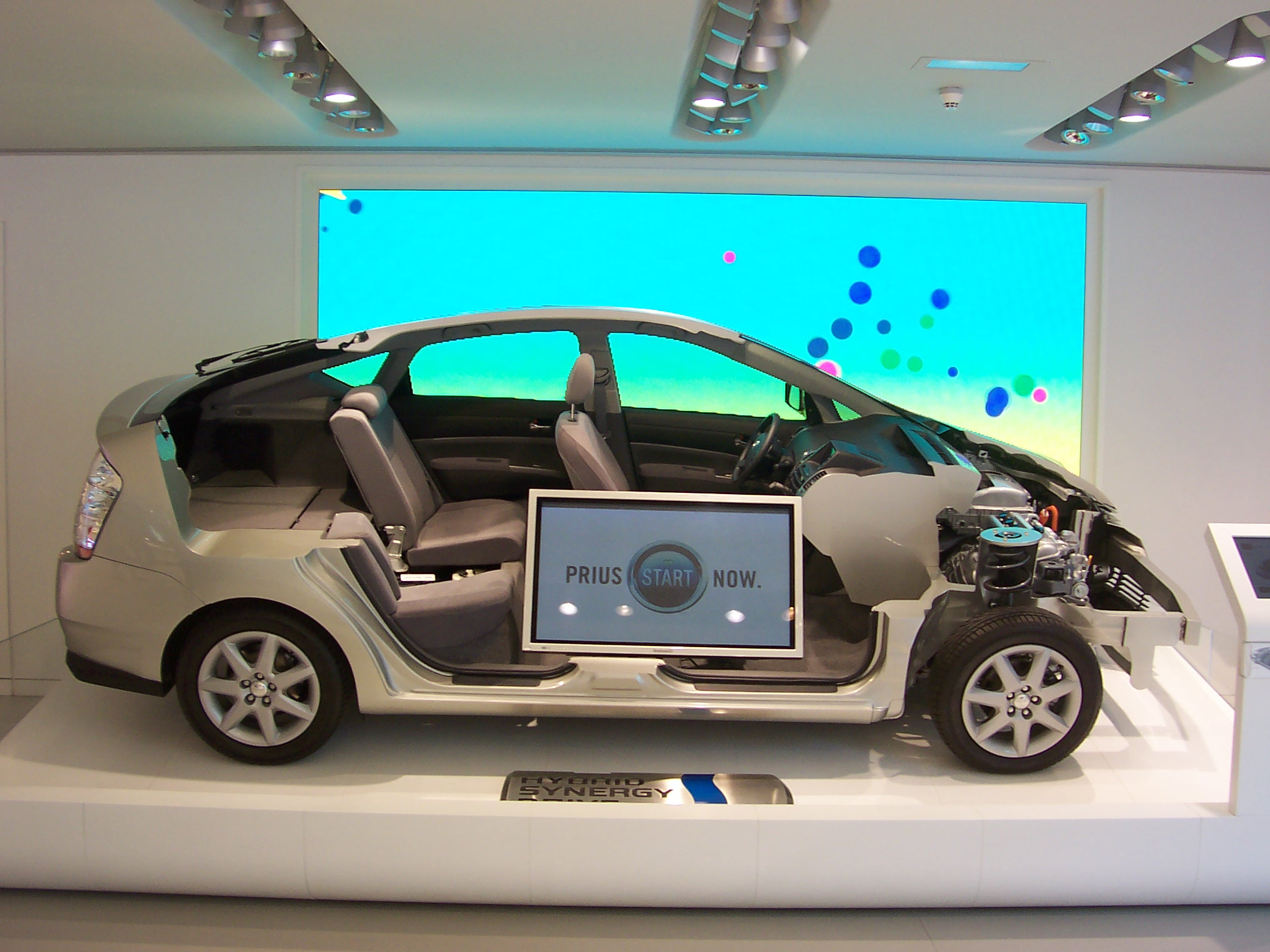
2006 Prius cut-away in a Toyota showroom in Paris

The Prius uses an all-electric A/C compressor for cooling, an industry first, and also adds an electric power steering system to further minimize engine belt-driven engine accessories. Combined with a smaller and lighter NiMH battery, the XW20 is more powerful and more efficient than the XW10. In the U.S., the battery pack of the 2004 Prius is warranted for 100,000 miles (160,000 km) or 8 years. The warranty for hybrid components in California and the seven Northeastern states that have adopted the stricter California emission control standards is 150,000 miles (240,000 km) or 10 years.

== Battery ==
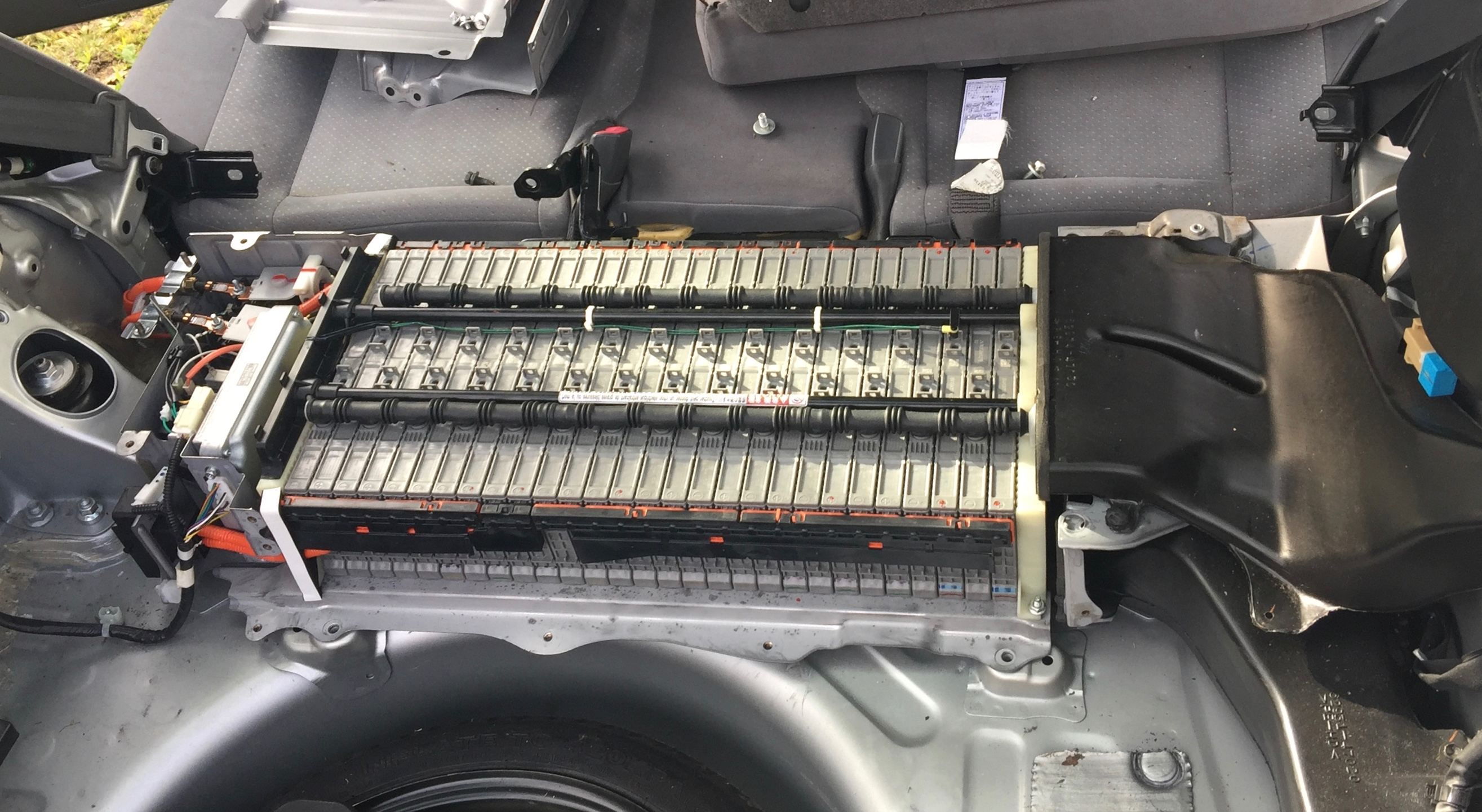
2021 reinstallation of original 2005 Prius hybrid battery, clearly showing the 28 modules, after replacement of several failed modules that caused the on screen red "triangle of death"

The second generation Prius makes use of a 201.6-volt NiMH battery composed of 28 modules, where each module is made of six individual 1.2-volt 6.5 Ah Prismatic NiMH cells. The 28 modules are connected in series to produce a total energy storage capacity of 1.310 kWh (201.6 volts × 6.5 Ah). The battery control computers keep the state of charge (SoC) between approximately 40% and 80% (shallow cycling), where the average SoC hovers around 60 percent, allowing about 400 Wh of useful energy storage to capture energy from regenerative braking and to release it back into the hybrid drive-train through Motor-generator 1 and Motor-generator 2 in the power split device. The shallow cycling enables the hybrid battery to last tens of thousands of cycles, which translates into decades of use and in many cases more than 200,000 miles (320,000 km) of operation. The computer controlled charging and discharging of the battery enhances its cycle life, calendar life, and thermal control performance. Passive battery cooling and heating is accomplished through the metal case of the battery assembly pack, while a forced air cooling system with a blower motor and ducting system enables active cooling of the HV battery.

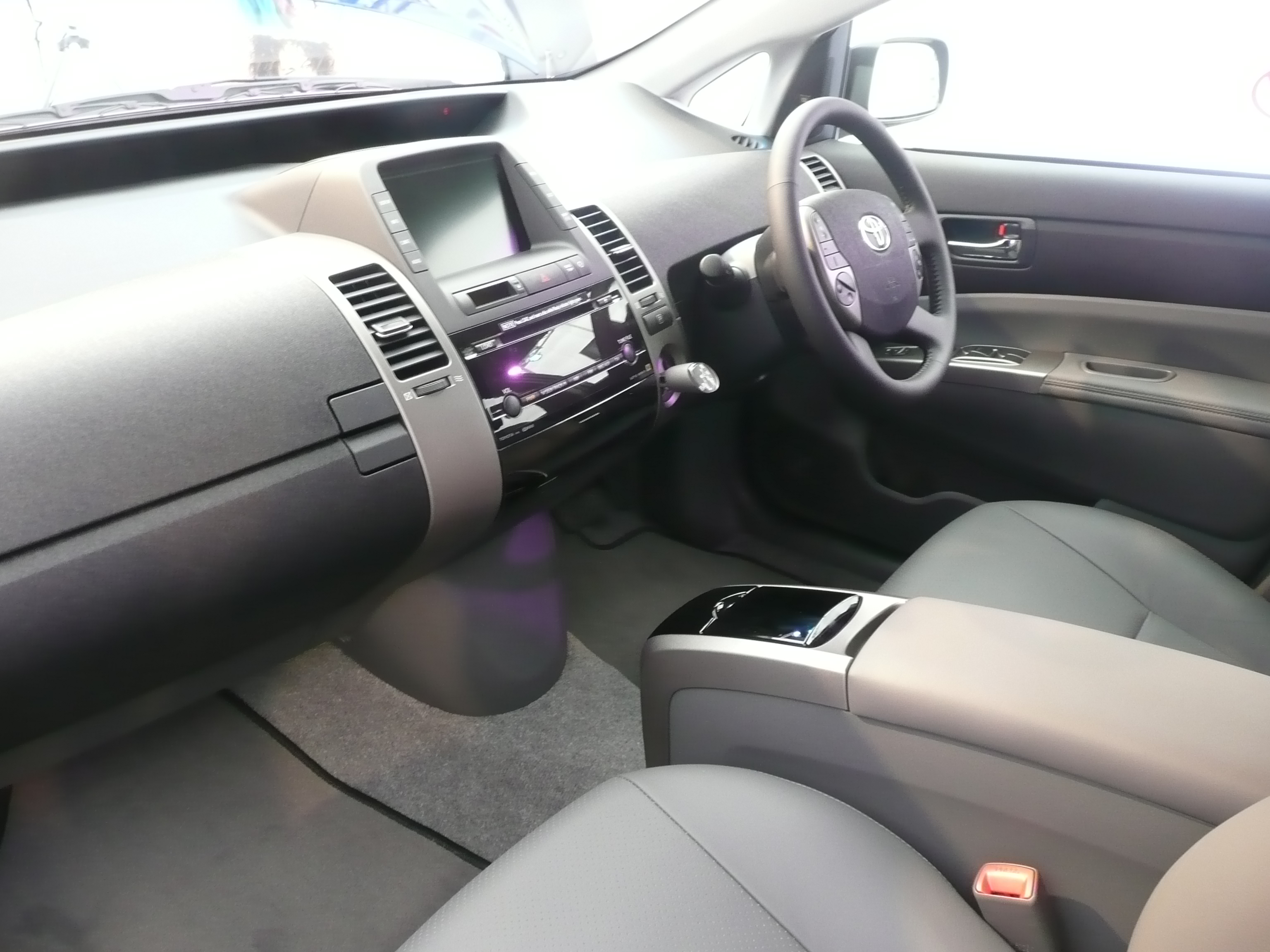
Interior

It is classified as a SULEV (Super Ultra Low Emissions Vehicle) and is certified by California Air Resources Board as an "Advanced Technology Partial Zero Emission Vehicle" (AT-PZEV).

Among the Prius's options are Toyota's implementation of a Smart Key System (the feature can be user-deactivated), DVD navigation on the multi-function display, Vehicle Stability Control and Bluetooth for hands-free calling. A new Intelligent Parking Assist system was available in Japan and Europe since its launch.

From 2005 to 2009, the second generation Prius had been built by FAW-Toyota in the city of Changchun for the Chinese market. It was reported that a total of 2,152 Prius were sold in 2006 and 414 in 2007. The relatively low sales was blamed on high price, about US$15,000 higher than the equivalent in Japan or the U.S., caused by high duties on imported parts. In early March 2008, Toyota cut the price of Prius by up to eight percent or US$3,000 to CN¥259,800 (US$36,500). It was thought that the sales dropped as a result of both a lack of acceptance and increased competition, from Honda as well as from local manufacturers.

Toyota's design and development efforts paid off during the 2005 European Car of the Year competition where the Prius won ahead of the Citroën C4 and the Ford Focus. The Prius and the Nissan Leaf are the only cars using drivewheel electric motors to have won this competition, where the usual winners are mainstream hatchbacks and sedans/saloons from major European manufacturers.

== Research plug-ins ==
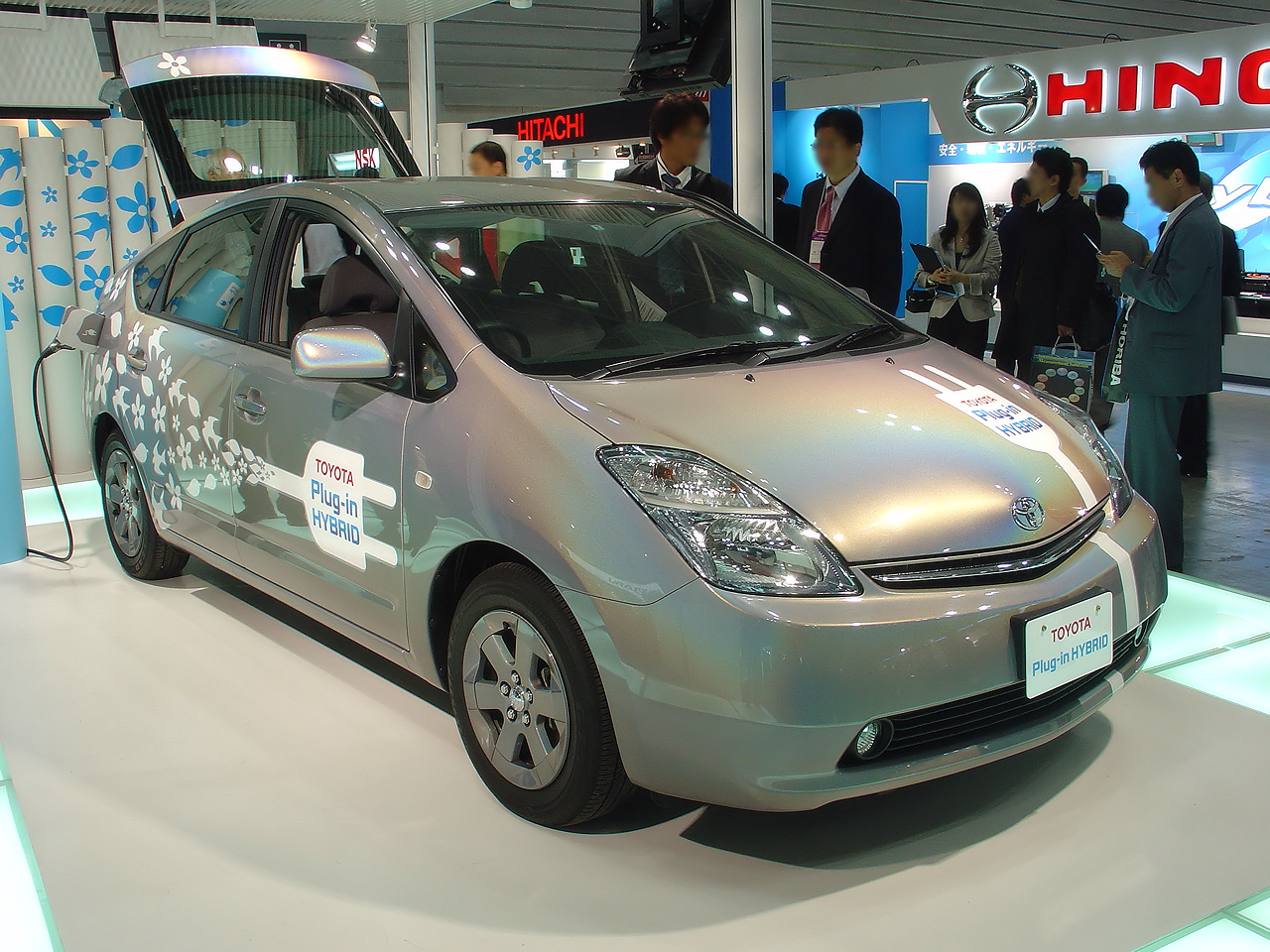
Toyota Prius plug-in hybrid prototype exhibited at the Automotive Engineering Exposition 2008, Yokohama City, Japan

From 2006 to 2009, Toyota tested 126 Prius models in the U.S., Japan and Europe that had the NiMH battery replaced with a lithium-ion battery pack.

In July 2007, Toyota received both Japanese and American governmental approval to begin testing plug-in hybrid models using a modified NiMH battery on public roads. The first plug-in Prius in America went to South Carolina. Researchers at the Advanced Power and Energy Program at the University of California, Irvine, and the Institute of Transportation Studies at the University of California, Berkeley, began testing two specially made Priuses and analyzing driver behavior, study air quality and energy use.

== Model year changes ==
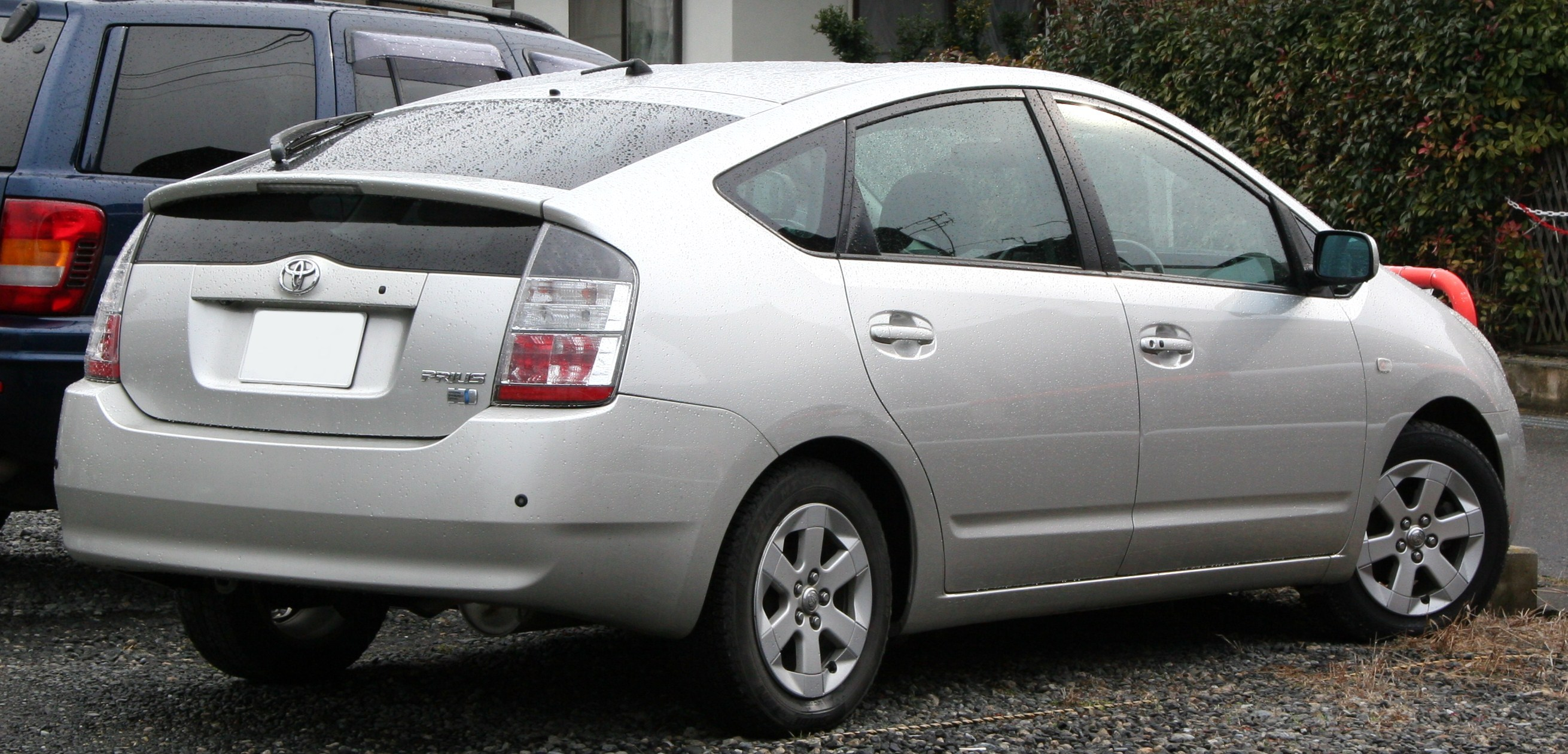
Pre-facelift Toyota Prius (with black upper tail-lamp portions)

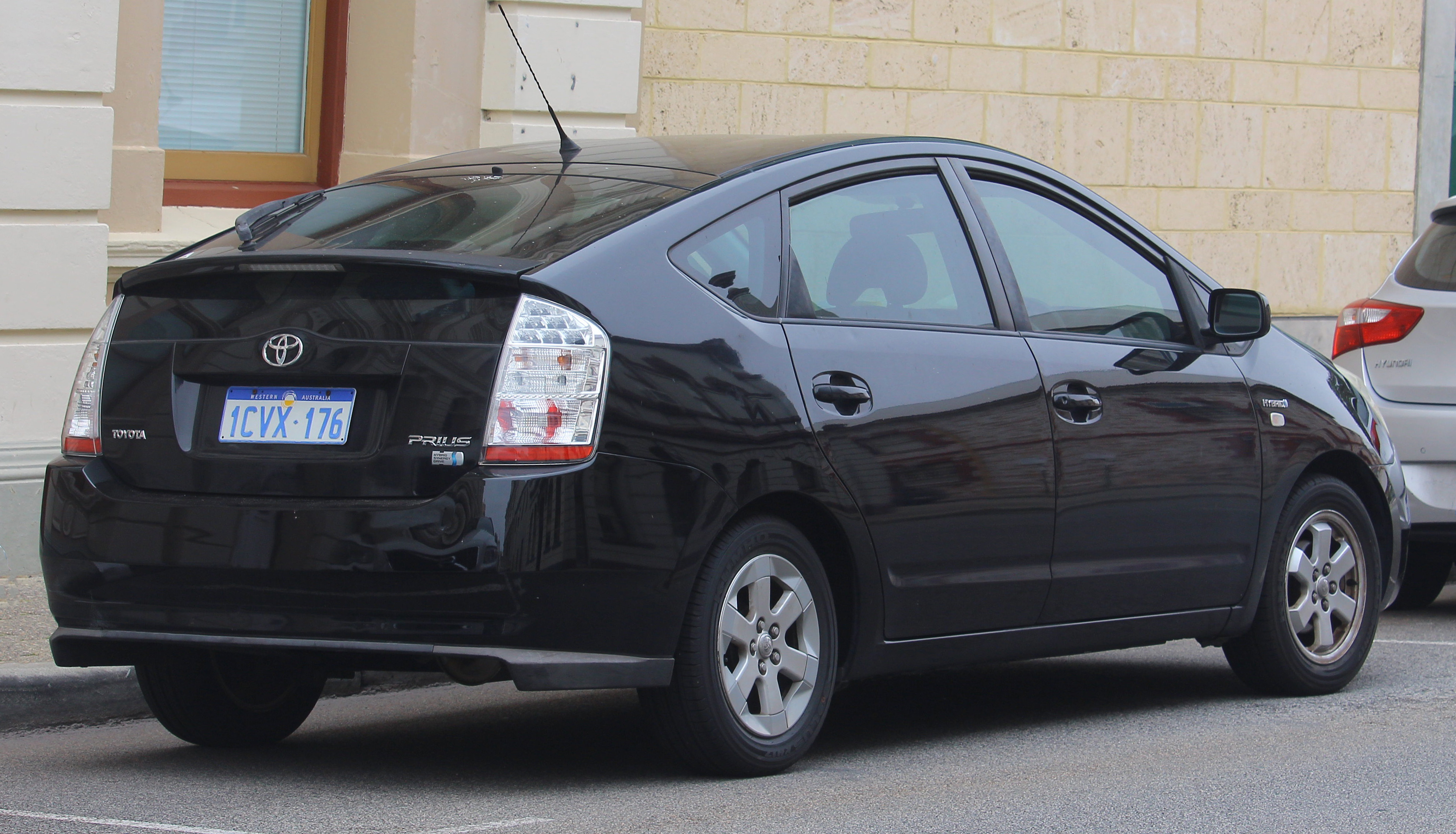
Facelift Toyota Prius (with clear upper tail-lamp portions)

In late 2005 (for the 2006 model year), Toyota introduced some minor cosmetic changes for the XW20, such as a slightly updated front-end, revised instruments, and repositioned rear seats. Other changes comprised a higher-resolution liquid crystal display, as well as new optional features such as a backup camera, advanced air bags and an upgraded audio system with an auxiliary input.

In 2006 (2007 US model year) the Prius added side-curtain air bags (standard on all models). A Touring Edition was introduced, with an elongated and larger rear spoiler as well as larger, sharper-pointed, seven-spoke, 16", magnesium wheels with plastic hubcap covers to protect them from scratches when parking against the curb. The Touring Edition also comes with a firmer, European-style, tuned suspension, standard high-intensity-discharge (HID) headlights, and integrated (non-HID) fog lights.

In 2005, Toyota had to fix a software glitch that caused the Prius' engine to enter "limp" mode with electric-only operation, following 68 stall complaints in the U.S. out of 160,000 worldwide sales. In June 2006, Toyota also recalled about 170,000 Prius models from 2004 to 2006 due to a faulty intermediate shaft and sliding yoke in the power steering system.

In May 2009, Toyota announced a production extension of the XW20 Prius primarily for fleet sales in Japan, available in a single EX grade. The EX featured the same basic equipment as the G and S grades previously sold in the Japanese market, but equipment such as hubcaps and front fog lights were made optional to reduce the base price, while colour options were reduced to Black, Silver Metallic, and Super White II, all with a body-coloured front grille and grey interior. The Prius EX went on sale in June 2009 and was discontinued in May 2012.

== Safety ==
Euro NCAP test results* Toyota Prius (2004)
Test	Score	Rating
Adult occupant:	34	5 /5 stars
Child occupant:	43	4 /5 stars
Pedestrian:	13	2 /4 stars

ANCAP test results* Toyota Prius i-Tech 5 door hatch (2004)
Test	Score
Overall	5 /5 stars
Frontal offset	13.72/16
Side impact	16/16
Pole	2/2
Seat belt reminders	2/3
Whiplash protection	Not Assessed
Pedestrian protection	Marginal
Electronic stability control	Standard

A 2011 Los Angeles Times article stated that complaints about sudden acceleration and rollover from 2006 to 2009 models have led to recalls. On another matter, an NHTSA database shows that 49% of all customer complaints about these model years were related to lighting, headlamps or visibility. Out of 216,000 Priuses with the optional high intensity discharge (HID) headlamps, there were 28,000 warranty repairs of this system. The headlamps would sometimes shut off without warning, and in rare cases, both headlamps would shut off. There were some injuries but no fatalities. Toyota avoided a recall on the headlights by agreeing to a class action settlement in which the warranty period was extended from three years to five years and by agreeing to reimburse owners for previous repairs. There was some remaining controversy over whether the failures were caused by the bulbs themselves or the computer system controlling them.

US National Highway Traffic Safety Administration (NHTSA) crash testing of the 2004 US model year Prius yielded a five-star driver and four-star passenger rating in the frontal-collision test (out of five stars). Side crash results were four out of five stars for both front and rear seats. The car scored four out of five stars in rollover testing.

US Insurance Institute for Highway Safety crash tests scored the Prius Good overall in frontal collisions and Good overall in side-impact collisions in models equipped with side airbags. A Poor score was given to models without side airbags. Side curtain and torso airbags became standard on 2007 American models.

== Official government fuel consumption data ==
In-dash monitor on a 2005 Toyota Prius multi-function display, displaying accumulative fuel economy for 59 miles (95 km) since last gasoline fill-up.

=== United States ===
In the U.S., the Environmental Protection Agency (EPA) test results must be posted on new vehicle windows, and are the only fuel consumption figures that can be advertised. EPA testing procedures for all vehicles were revised in 2007 in an attempt to better match what the average driver would achieve.

The following data is taken from the EPA figures for the Prius: 48 mpg_{‑US} (4.9 L/100 km; 58 mpg_{‑imp}) city driving, 45 mpg_{‑US} (5.2 L/100 km; 54 mpg_{‑imp}) highway driving, 46 mpg_{‑US} (5.1 L/100 km; 55 mpg_{‑imp}) combined.

=== United Kingdom ===
The official UK fuel consumption data, provided by the Department for Transport, rates the Prius as: 56.5 mpg_{‑imp} (5.00 L/100 km; 47.0 mpg_{‑US}) urban, 67.3 mpg_{‑imp} (4.20 L/100 km; 56.0 mpg_{‑US}) extra urban and 65.7 mpg_{‑imp} (4.30 L/100 km; 54.7 mpg_{‑US}) combined.

== Air pollution ==
In the United States the EPA measures a vehicle's air-borne pollution based on hydrocarbons, nitrogen oxides, carbon monoxide, particulate matter and formaldehyde before assigning them a score. In most states the XW20 Prius is rated Tier II Bin 3. CARB also does its own emission scoring, the XW20 Prius meets AT-PZEV certification in California and states that adopted CARB emission rules.

The second generation Prius tied with the MINI Cooper D as the fourth least CO_{2}-emitting vehicles at 104 g/km, behind the Ford Fiesta Econetic at 98 g/km and the tied Volkswagen Polo 1.4 TDI/SEAT Ibiza 1.4 TDI at 99 g/km. It is the least CO_{2}-emitting gasoline powered car (the Ford and the Polo/Ibiza run on diesel).

== Awards ==
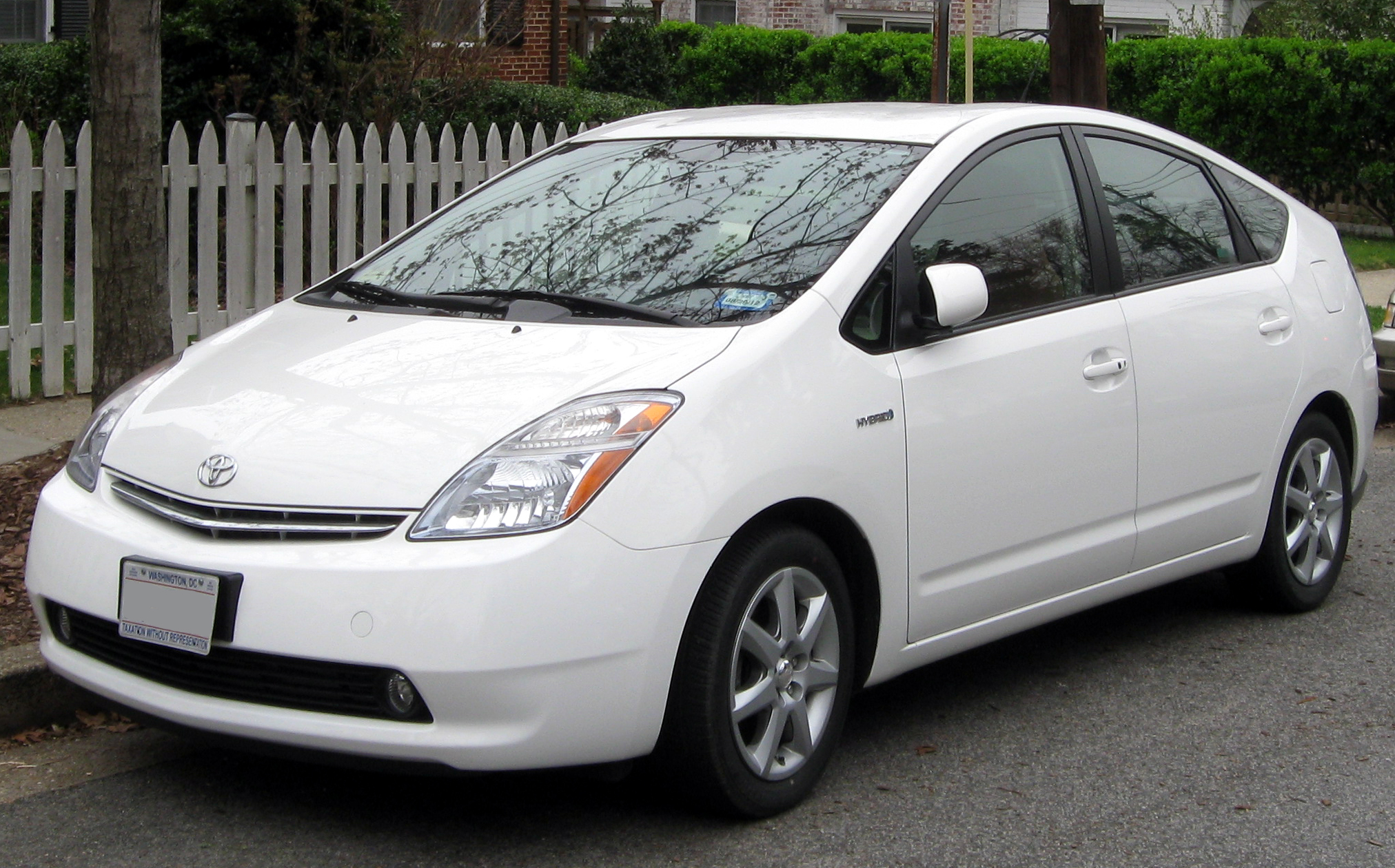
2007–2009 model year Toyota Prius Touring (US)

- 2004 Motor Trend Car of the Year.
- 2004 Car and Driver magazine's Ten Best list.
- 2004 North American Car of the Year award.
- 2004 International Engine of the Year 2004.
- 2004 "Best Engineered Vehicle for 2004" by SAE's Automotive Engineering International magazine.
- 2005 European Car of the Year.
- 2006 EnerGuide Award (Midsize).
- 2006 Intellichoice Best Overall Value of the Year, Midsize.
- 2007 Intellichoice "Best in Class Winner": best retained value, lowest fuel, lowest operating costs, lowest ownership costs.
- 2007 Swiss government named Toyota Prius the world's greenest car in a draft study of over 6,000 cars.
- 2008 "Green Engine of the Year" from International Engine of the Year Awards.
- 2008 JD Power and Associates "Most Dependable Compact Car", and again in 2009
- ABC News Top 10 Innovations of the Decade.
