= Horry =

Horry is a surname. Notable people with the surname include:

- Baby Boy Horry (2008–2008), a formerly unidentified deceased American baby
- Daniel Horry (c. 1747–1785), American Revolutionary War colonel and politician
- Elias Horry (1773–1834), American lawyer, politician, businessman and plantation owner
- George Cecil Horry (1907–1981), British-born New Zealand confidence trickster, tailor and convicted murderer
- Peter Horry (1743 or 1747–1815), American Revolutionary War militia leader and Horry County namesake
- Robert Horry (born 1970), American basketball player
- Thomas Stanley Horry (1898–1960), English First World War flying ace
- William Frederick Horry (1843–1872), English murderer

== See also ==
- Hori (disambiguation)
- Horrie
