= Ern Jenkins =

Australian rules footballer, coach and umpire

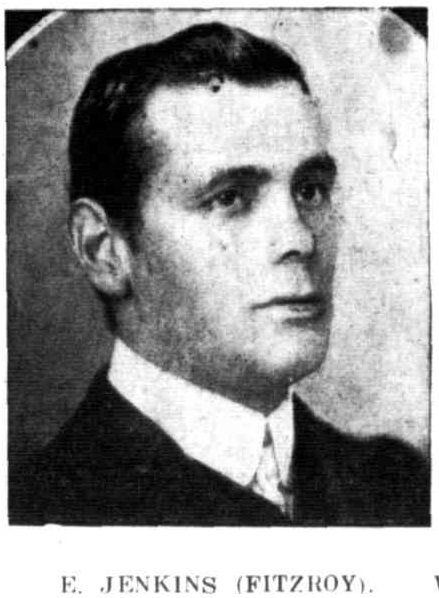
- Jenkins in 1907

Personal information
- Full name: Ernest Merrett Jenkins
- Born: 4 October 1879; Collingwood, Victoria
- Died: 21 December 1927 (aged 48); Fitzroy, Victoria

Playing career^{1}
Years	Club	Games (Goals)
1897–1910	Fitzroy	182 (16)

Coaching career
Years	Club	Games (W–L–D)
1913	Richmond	18 (6–12–0)
- ^{1} Playing statistics correct to the end of 1910.

Career highlights
- 3× VFL premiership player: 1899, 1904, 1905; Fitzroy captain: 1906–1907

Ernest Merrett Jenkins (4 October 1879 – 21 December 1927) was an Australian rules footballer who played for the Fitzroy Football Club, coach of the Richmond Football Club and an umpire in the Victorian Football League (VFL). Jenkins was uncle of Fitzroy player Horrie Dawson.

== Playing career ==
Jenkins played for the Fitzroy Football Club in the Victorian Football League (VFL) between 1897 and 1908 and again in 1910.

== Coaching career ==
He was senior coach of the Richmond Football Club in 1913.

== Umpiring career ==
Jenkins later joined the VFL as a goal umpire making his debut in VFL senior football in 1920. By the time of his death in 1927, Jenkins had umpired 132 senior matches, including five grand finals.

== Bibliography ==
- Hogan P: The Tigers Of Old, Richmond FC, Melbourne 1996
- Donald, Chris (2002). Fitzroy: For The Love Of The Jumper. Pan Macmillan Australia. ISBN 978-1-877029-18-9.
