= Te Waharoa =

Te Waharoa (died September 1838) was the leader of the Ngāti Hauā iwi (Māori tribe) of the eastern Waikato in New Zealand in the 1820s and 1830s.

His father was Tangimoana of Ngāti Hauā and his mother was Te Kahurangi. As a small child Te Waharoa lived at Maungakawa, north-east of Cambridge. A group of Te Arawa attacked Maungakawa and Te Waharoa was taken to the Rotorua district where he spent his childhood among Te Arawa. He returned to Ngāti Hauā when he was a young man. He took part in fights during the Musket Wars, when Ngāti Hauā supported Waikato and Ngāti Maniapoto tribes against Te Rauparaha and Ngāti Toa, until Ngāti Toa were driven from Kāwhia in 1821.

Te Waharoa became the leading chief of Ngāti Hauā. He led his tribe in preserving their territory from occupation by other tribes, including driving out Ngāti Maru in the 1820s, after they outstayed their welcome by weight of numbers, building 15 pa in Ngati Haua territory and the overtaxing of local food resources, when taking refuge from Ngāpuhi attacks on the Hauraki area. The final act that drove Te Waharoa to desperate measures was when Ngati Maru built Kaipaki pa very close to his own at Maungakawa. He spread the news that he was leaving the rohe for Tauranga so Ngati Maru would lower their guard. He then returned at night and launched a successful surprise attack on the much larger iwi. 200 people in Kaipaki pa were either eaten or enslaved. After expelling Ngāti Maru from Matamata pā, near the present-day settlement of Waharoa (rather than the present-day town of Matamata), Te Waharoa made it his main pā. He also drove Ngāti Maru from the Horotiu district along the Waikato River and the Maungatautari district. Te Waharoa maintained military and trade links with the Ngāi Te Rangi and Ngāti Ranginui tribes who lived in the Tauranga district, across Ngāti Hauā's eastern boundary, the Kaimai Range. When the Tauranga tribes were threatened by a Ngāpuhi war party led by Te Haramiti in 1831, Te Waharoa and Ngāti Hauā went to the aid of Tupaea and the Tauranga people, and together they defeated the Ngāpuhi party. Also in December 1831 Te Wahoroa joined with a huge Waikato force estimated at 2,500 to 4,000 warriors under Te Whero whero who launched an assault on North Taranaki tribes Ngati Tama and Ngati Mutanga. In January 1832 the Waikato taua with Te Wahaoroa launched further assaults against Pukerangiora Pa which held 4,000 people. The besieged ran out of food and a large group of Taranaki children, women and older people fled at night. Most were caught by Waikato and killed, with only a few escaping. Two weeks later the men ran out of food and tried to escape at night in a sudden rush. In their weakened state they were easily overcome and many jumped over cliffs to avoid the Waikato slaughter. In all between 1,000 and 1500 people were killed. As was usual prisoner were killed and eaten with prisoners " being decapitated, disembowelled, cooked and eaten". The battle was noted for its savagery with Waikato going down to the bottom of the cliffs and killing those who had survived the leap.

When Anglican missionaries came to his region, Te Waharoa wished to have a missionary resident there and a mission station was established near Matamata pā in 1835. One of the first students at the mission school was Te Waharoa's son Tarapipipi, later known as Wiremu Tamihana.

After a relative of Te Waharoa was murdered by a Te Arawa man, there were a number of skirmishes with Te Arawa in 1836. Ngāti Hauā, with support from other tribes, attacked and destroyed a Te Arawa pā and Phillip Tapsell's trading station at Maketu in March. Then in August Ngāti Hauā attacked Ngāti Whakaue at Ohinemutu in Rotorua. Helead his warriors against neighbouring tribes with the fighting, which continued into 1836, extended from Rotorua, Matamata to Tauranga.

Te Waharoa fell ill in 1838. He probably had erysipelas, which his principal wife Rangi Te Wiwini died of at the time. Te Waharoa died at Matamata in early September 1838. Te Arahi, the eldest son of Te Waharoa and Rangi Te Wiwini, became the leader of Ngāti Hauā, before his younger brother Wiremu Tamihana Tarapipipi rose to prominence. Tamihana was a leader in the Māori King Movement, and became known as the kingmaker.
