= Yatterman Night =

2015 anime series

- Promotional visual featuring (from left to right) Elephantus, Leopard, and Voltkatze.
- 夜ノヤッターマン
- Genre: Comedy drama, fantasy, science fiction
- Created by: Tatsunoko Production
- Based on: Yatterman
- Screenplay by: Kazuyuki Fudeyasu
- Directed by: Tatsuya Yoshihara
- Music by: Tatsuya Kato
- Country of origin: Japan
- Original language: Japanese
- No. of episodes: 12

Production
- Producers: Atsushi Moriyama (chief); Kozo Misawa (chief); Ken Yoda; Kozo Mizawa; Tomoro Uchida; Daisuke Takekoshi; Atsushi Moriyama; Terushige Yoshie; Yusuke Dan
- Animator: Tatsunoko Production
- Production companies: Tatsunoko Production; Yatterman Night Committee (Note: Label consisting of various companies.)

Original release
- Network: Tokyo MX, ytv, CTV, BS NTV
- Release: January 13 – March 31, 2015

Yatterman Night (夜ノヤッターマン, Yoru no Yattāman) is an anime television series by Tatsunoko Production. The series celebrates the 40th anniversary of the Time Bokan franchise and is inspired by Tatsunoko's 1970s anime series Yatterman. The series aired in Japan between January 13 and March 31, 2015, and is licensed in North America by Funimation.

== Plot ==
A long time ago, the Yattermen were heroes of justice who fought against the evil Doronbow Gang, exiling them and bringing peace to the Yatter Kingdom. Several generations later, however, the Yattermen have since become corrupt with power while everyone else has been forced to live in poverty and despair. After losing her mother to the Yattermen's selfishness, Leopard, a direct good descendant of the gang's leader Doronjo, reforms the Doronbow Gang with Boyacky and Tonzra's good descendants, Voltkatze and Elephantus, to rebel against the corrupt Yattermen.

== Characters ==
Leopard (レパード, Repādo) / Doronjo (ドロンジョ)
Voiced by: Eri Kitamura
A 9-year old girl who is a direct good descendant of the Doronbow Gang's leader, Doronjo. When her mother dies as a result of the current Yattermen not allowing her to get the medicine she needed, Leopard reforms the Doronbow Gang to take vengeance against the Yatter Kingdom.
Voltkatze (ヴォルトカッツェ, Vorutokattse) / Boyacky (ボヤッキー, Boyakkī)
Voiced by: Hiroaki Hirata
Boyacky's good descendant, who serves as the brain of the group by creating various machines out of bits and pieces.
Elephantus (エレパントゥス, Erepantusu) / Tonzra (トンズラー, Tonzurā)
Voiced by: Kenta Miyake
Tonzra's good descendant, who serves as the brawn of the group with his large and strong build.
Dokurobey (ドクロベエ, Dokurobē)
Voiced by: Hori
A skull that fell to Earth long ago and helped form the original Doronbow Gang. It is later revealed that he is the one posing as the current Yatterman as revenge against humanity for his past failures.
Lord Oda (オダさま, Oda-sama)
Voiced by: Chiaki Takahashi
Leopard's pet pig. Able to speak, he takes the role of the funny little pig robot cheering up the original Doronbow Gang.
Galina (ガリナ, Garina) / Yatterman-1
Voiced by: Hiroyuki Yoshino
A 17-year old boy whose parents were killed by the evil mastermind whom he believed to be the "Yatterman". He is nicknamed Gatchan. He joins the Doronbow Gang on their journey, making them their new outfits. He generally lacks self-confidence, often using a dice to make his decisions. As time goes on, he starts having lessons on mechanics from Voltkatze. He is childhood friends with Alouette and is very protective of her. Doronjo has feelings for him, a fact she takes some time to accept. By the time the evil mastermind whose masquerading as the Yatterman known as Dokurobey is revealed, he becomes the new Yatterman-1 in episode 12.
Alouette (アルエット, Aruetto) / Yatterman-2
Voiced by: Shizuka Itō
A 17-year old girl and childhood friend of Galina, who calls her Ally for short. Like Galina, her parents were killed by the evil mastermind whom believed to be the "Yatterman", but she is in denial over their deaths. She is very kind-hearted and considers Leopard to be her angel. By the time the evil mastermind whose masquerading as the Yatterman known as Dokurobey is revealed, she becomes the new Yatterman-2 in episode 12.
General Goro (ゴロー将軍, Gorō-shogun)
Voiced by: Nobuyuki Hiyama
A general working for Yatterman Army. He uses Yatterpug as his robot weapon and fights with an electrical cane. He is hinted to know Galina from before and his dog is friendly with Galina. He is later revealed to be Alouette's father, Gorozo (ゴロゾウ, Gorozō), who converted into a cyborg by Dokurobey and wiped of his memories. After regaining his memories, he sacrifices himself to help out Allouette without her ever knowing his fate.
Twelve Yatter Guardian Gods (ヤッター十二神将, Yattā Jū-ni Shinshōhō)
Voiced by: Kentarō Itō, Akio Suyama, Ryōta Takeuchi
A group of cyborgs who, along with Goro, form twelve generals serving Yatterman. They were all programmed so that they can only identify Dokurobey as the true Yatterman. Their respective names, based on numbers, are Ichiro, Jiro, Saburo, Shiro, Rokuro, Nana, Hachi-Yellow, Kyuro, Juro, Juichiro, and Juniro.
Yatter Soldiers (ヤッター兵, Yattā-hei)
Voiced by: Yasuaki Takumi (male), Noriko Shitaya (female)
Robotics soldiers modelled after the original Yatterman-1 and Yatterman-2, of which there are a large quantity of. Before the advent of General Goro, their field leader was a composite robot, half Yatterman-1 and half Yatterman-2. Instead of the original Kenda-magic and Electric Cane of their human predecessors, they use deadly laser pistols.
Dorothy (ドロシー, Doroshī)
Voiced by: Shizuka Itō
Leopard's mother, who died from illness after the Yattermen refused to let Leopard and the others obtain medicine for her.

== Production ==
The series by Tatsunoko Production began to air in Japan between January 13 and March 31, 2015. The series is directed by Tatsuya Yoshihara and written by Kazuyuki Fudeyasu, with music by Tatsuya Katou and character design by Keisuke Goto. The opening theme is "Kyokugen Dreamer" (極限Dreamer, Limit Dreamer) by Screen Mode whilst the ending theme is "Jōnetsu Continue" (情熱CONTINUE, Passion Continue) by Sphere. The anime is licensed in North America by Funimation, who are simulcast the series as it aired. Animax aired the series in South-East Asia.

=== Episode list ===
No.	Title	Original release date
1	"The World is Pitch-Black" "Sekai wa Makkura Yami" (世界は真っ暗闇)	January 13, 2015
Outside of the prestigious Yatter Kingdom is a country of poverty. There, a young girl named Leopard learns that her mother, Dorothy, and her two close friends, Voltkatze and Elephantus, are direct descendants of the Doronbow Gang; Doronjo, Boyacky, and Tonzra, whose battle against the Yattermen long ago led to their people becoming exiled and living in poverty. Dorothy encourages Leopard to become a good girl and not become a villain like her ancestors. However, on the day of Leopard's ninth birthday, Dorothy develops an illness that cannot be treated with their country's medicine. Wanting to save her mother, Leopard goes with Voltkatze and Elephantus to try to get some help from the Yatter Kingdom, only to be attacked by the current Yattermen, who are shown to be cruel unlike their heroic ancestors, leaving them unable to prevent Dorothy from succumbing to her illness. Deciding the Yatterman are not the heroes she admired, Leopard takes on the name of Doronjo and forges a new Doronbow Gang with Voltkatze and Elephantus to get revenge on the Yatter Kingdom.
2	"We'll Give Yatterman a Forehead Flicking" "Yattāman ni Dekopin o" (ヤッターマンにデコピンを)	January 20, 2015
Leopard and her new Doronbow Gang learn that they might be able to sneak into the Yatter Kingdom through an abandoned train tunnel. Making their way through the tunnel and arriving in the Yatter Kingdom, the gang come up against a pair of Yatter Soldiers and fight against them using a Forehead Flicking Mecha. However, they discover the Yatter Soldiers are actually robots, with an entire army showing up against them and destroying their mech. After barely escaping the Yatter Soldiers, Leopard and the others take shelter in an empty house to dry off. Just then, a young blind girl shows up at the house, believing Leopard to be her angel.
3	"We're Not Angels But We'll Pretend To Be" "Ore-tachi wa Tenshi janai kedo Tenshi no Furi o suru" (俺たちは天使じゃないけど天使のフリをする)	January 27, 2015
As the gang pretend to be angels for the girl, who introduces herself as Alouette, her childhood friend, Galina, shows up. Despite being suspicious of the gang, Galina decides not to report them to the Yatter Soldier when they come around searching for them. Galina explains how both his and Alouette's parents were killed by the Yattermen whilst working in their capital, Yatter Metropolis, asking the gang to leave in the morning so as to not put Alouette in danger. The next day, the gang take their leave, but return when Galina and Alouette are confronted by the Yatter Soldier for harboring them. Using an explosive mech to escape, the gang take Alouette and Galina with them on their journey to Yatter Metropolis.
4	"Steamy Outdoor Hot Spring Trip" "Yukemuri Rotenburo Kikō" (湯けむり露天風呂紀行)	February 3, 2015
While on their journey, the gang meet a pregnant woman named Mitchan and her husband Beene, and help them out with some chores. After taking a dip in the hot springs, the gang return to find the Yatter Soldiers taking away several villagers, including Beene, to work heavy labor in Yatter Metropolis for 35 years. Feeling sorry for Mitchan, Leopard and the others beat the Yatter Soldier and rescue Beene, hoping to take the couple back to their home, while a Yatterman General named Goro attempts to track them down. Not wanting Mitchan to suffer, Beene reveals the Doronbow Gang's location to Goro in the hopes he will be pardoned from his heavy labor. After overwhelming the gang with his fighting skill and YatterPug mech, Goro goes back on his word and takes Mitchan's husband away anyway, leaving Mitchan devastated and Leopard more determined than ever to beat the Yattermen.
5	"The Hurricane Dedicated to His Mother" "Haha ni Sasageru Harikēn" (母に捧げるハリケーン)	February 10, 2015
The gang come across a boy named Takeshi who enters himself and Galina into a sumo tournament. After some intense training, the two inevitably face off against each other in the semi-finals, with Takeshi winning easily. However, Takeshi's final opponent turns out to be a giant Yatter Mech who, despite some tough resistance from Takeshi, overpowers him. Realising the entire tournament was rigged in the Yattermen's favor, the Doronbow Gang bring out their own Genghiskhan mech to fight against the Yatter Mechs. Defeating all of the mechs and becoming the champions of all the fighting tournaments, Leopard gives their winnings to Takeshi so he can help his mother.
6	"The Flower That Blooms in Winter" "Fuyu ni Saku Hana" (冬に咲く花)	February 17, 2015
With the gang constantly being pursued by Goro, Leopard gets upset when Voltkatze and Elephantus tell her to give up on pursuing the Yattermen and goes off on her own, only to be chased by Yatter Soldiers. Meanwhile, as the others are also ambushed, they end up leaving behind Galina, who is captured by Goro. Winding up all alone and injured, Leopard is rescued by an old man who treats her injuries and gives her shelter. The next morning, as Goro prepares to have Galina executed to lure out the gang, Doronjo, encouraged by the man's words, goes to rescue him, soon aided by the rest of the gang in their Flower Picker Mech.
7	"Dream Sea" "Yume no Umi" (夢の海)	February 24, 2015
Delirious from hunger after days without food, the gang come across a masochistic fisherman named Ryu, who they initially believe to be a turtle that would take them to the Sea God's Palace like in the legend of Urashima Tarō. Taking advantage of this, Goro sends a turtle, which the gang are too delirious to identify as a Yatter Mech, to take them to an underwater power plant disguised as the Sea God's Palace, where the Yatter Soldiers lay a trap for them. While the others are knocked out by sleeping gas, Ryu tells Galina, who snaps out of his delusion, about his dream to escape through the walls surrounding Yatter Kingdom and find his own Sea God's Palace. After waking up the others, Galina comes up with an escape plan in which the gang use an Octopus Mech as a decoy while they escape using a Squid Mech. When the Yatter Soldiers pursue them with their own Yattersunfish Mech, the gang steer it into one of the fans in the wall, allowing Ryu and his turtle friends to swim through to the other side.
8	"Kussie of Lake Kussharo-Dessharo" "Kussharo-Dessharo Mizuumi no Kusshī" (クッシャロデッシャロ湖のクッシー)	March 3, 2015
While treating Leopard as she comes down with a fever, Galina tells her about Allouette's father, Gorozo, who entrusted him with Allouette's protection, while Leopard seems to develop feelings for him. Meanwhile, Allouette comes across Kussie, a monster from Lake Kussharo-Dessharo whose mother was captured by Goro and Yatter Soldiers, who wanted to use the nearby land for a factory. Despite her fever, Leopard decides to help Kussie reunite with his mother and the group head to Lake Kussharo-Dessharo, where Kussie's mother is being held captive. Just as Goro corners them, he is distracted by the lavender scent coming off of Allouette, giving Kussie's mother the chance to break free and counterattack, allowing mother and child to be reunited.
9	"Abareshi Prison" "Abareshi Daikangoku" (アバレシ番外地)	March 10, 2015
Down to his last chance, Goro manages to capture Leopard, Voltkatze, and Elephantus and takes them to Abareshi Prison, an allegedly inescapable place. Looking for a way to escape themselves, Galina and Allouette come across an abandoned racing car being guarded by a monkey named Sanpee, whose owner is no longer around. Wanting to save his friends, Galina fixes up the car, which has a self-driving AI, and the group head off to intercept the paddywagon carrying the gang before it reaches the prison. As they catch up them, Goro once again gets distracted by Allouette and is knocked into the sea by Galina, who fights off the Yatter Soldiers and reunites with the others. Whilst trying to steer the wagon away from the prison, Galina accidentally speeds it up, destroying the prison instead. As Goro is thrown into prison for his failure, Doronjo and the others finally arrive at Yatter Metropolis.
10	"The Twelve Yatter Guardian Gods' Encirclement" "Yattā Jū-ni Shinshōhōi-mō" (ヤッター十二神将包囲網)	March 17, 2015
On their way towards the tower in the center of Yatter Metropolis, where they believe Yatterman to be hiding, the gang survey the factories people are being forced to work in. Upon nearing the inner city, they are confronted by the other generals of the Twelve Yatter Guardian Gods, who Goro was formerly a part of, and are quickly captured. Before they can be executed, they are requested to be brought before Yatterman, who they are shocked to discover is actually the original Doronbow mastermind, Dokurobey.
11	"The Truth About Yatter Metropolis" "Shinjitsu no Yattā Metoroporisu" (真実のヤッター・メトロポリス)	March 24, 2015
Dokurobey explains how many years ago, he and the original Doronbow Gang fought against the original Yattermen in order to reclaim the Dokuro Stones that made up his body. After years of failure, Dokurobey exiled the Doronbow descendants and declared war on the world, defeating the Yattermen in the process. Deciding to punish mankind further, Dokurobey took on the name of Yatterman, making humans work for and admire him without them knowing his true identity. As the gang try to find their way out of prison, Goro recalls he was once Allouette's father, Gorozo, who along with his dog was captured by Dokurobey and made into a cyborg following a near-fatal accident. Learning of this, Goro uses the last of his strength to help the gang escape on a mech, which is soon shot down by Dokurobey.
12	"The Dawn" "Yoake" (夜明け)	March 31, 2015
Feeling they cannot defeat Dokurobey on their own, Leopard and the others try to spread the word that Yatterman is actually Dokurobey, albeit to no avail. Believing the people will listen to Yatterman, Galina suggests that he and Allouette take on the role of Yatterman themselves. Regaining her sight, Allouette gives her thanks to Leopard and makes a promise with her to bring about a new dawn. After all the preparations are made, Leopard, realising that this will be the last time the gang will be able to work with Galina and Allouette, gives her farewell to Galina. Becoming the new Yatterman-1 and Yatterman-2, Galina and Allouette unite the citizens of the Yatter Kingdom before going to fight against Dokurobey, who grows himself to giant size, while the Doronbow Gang fight against the Yatter Generals. Using the power of their Yatterwan mech, the new Yattermen defeat Dokurobey and bring a new dawn to the Yatter Kingdom, allowing Leopard to return to a peaceful life.
