= Seti (Viceroy of Kush) =

Ancient Egyptian official, Viceroy of Kush

Seti (Sety)
- Viceroy of Kush
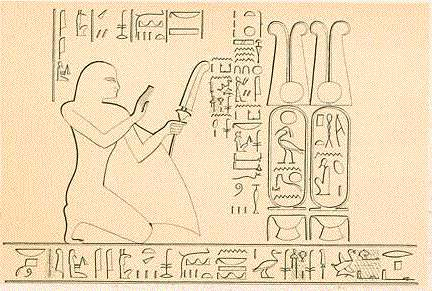
- The King's Son of Kush in Sehel.
- Predecessor: Khaemteri?
- Successor: Hori I?
- Dynasty: 19th Dynasty
- Pharaoh: Siptah
- Spouse: Amen-em-ta-iauw
- Children: Amenemheb, Head bowman, Charioteer of His Majesty, Overseer of the Southern Lands

Seti was an ancient Egyptian Viceroy of Kush during the 19th Dynasty, serving under Pharaoh Siptah. He is attested in year 1 of Siptah. Seti is also mentioned on some monuments of his son Amenemhab. Amenemhab was the son of Seti and the Lady Amenemtaiauw. Seti held the titles fan-bearer on the king's right, and king's scribe of the letters of the Pharaoh. His son Amenemheb served as Head Bowman, Charioteer of His Majesty, and Overseer of the Southern Lands.

In Abu Simbel Seti is given the titles: Hereditary Prince, Count, King's Son of Kush, Overseer of the Gold Lands of Amun, Fan-bearer on the King's right, King's Scribe of the letters of Pharaoh, First chief in the stable, Eyes of the King of Upper Egypt, Ears of the King of Lower Egypt, High-Priest of the Moon-god, Thoth, Overseer of the Treasury, and Overseer of the letter-scribes in the Court of the Palace-of-Ramesses-Miamun, in the Court.

Seti is attested in:

- Abu Simbel. An inscription by the king's messenger, Rekhpehtuf, states that he came "when his lord came to establish the king's son of Kush, Sety, in his place"
- Buhen. Graffito by the king's messenger, Neferhor, mentions "he came with rewards for the officials of Ta-Set and to bring the king's son of Kush, Sety, on his first trip"
- Sehel
- The road from Assuan to Philae.
- relief block with the images and titles of Seti and the cartouches of king Siptah, found in 2017 near Beni Suef.
