= Horrie Jose =

Australian rules footballer

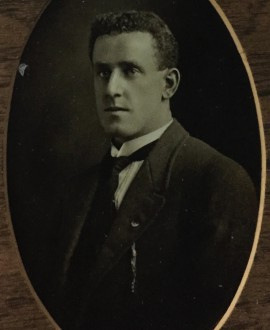

Personal information
- Full name: Horace Milton Jose
- Born: 30 March 1893; North Melbourne, Victoria
- Died: 19 May 1966 (aged 73); Box Hill, Victoria
- Original team: Melbourne District
- Height: 180 cm (5 ft 11 in)
- Weight: 76 kg (168 lb)

Playing career^{1}
Years	Club	Games (Goals)
1915–17, 1919	Collingwood	17 (2)
- ^{1} Playing statistics correct to the end of 1919.

Horace Milton Jose (30 March 1893 – 19 May 1966) was an Australian rules footballer who played with Collingwood in the Victorian Football League (VFL).
