= Hori II (Viceroy of Kush) =

Ancient Egyptian official

- Viceroy of Kush
- Predecessor: Hori I
- Successor: Wentawat? Siese?
- Dynasty: 20th Dynasty
- Pharaoh: Ramesses III, Ramesses IV, Ramesses V?
- Father: Hori I
- Children: Wentawat?
- Burial: Tell Basta (Bubastis)

Hori II is a son of Hori I and also served as Viceroy of Kush. Their tombs have been found in Tell Basta. Hori II may have been the father of a later Viceroy named Wentawat.

Hori II held the titles King's son of Kush, overseer of the Gold Lands of Amen-Re, King of the Gods, and king's scribe.

A depiction of Hori II and the Governor of Buhen are shown before the cartouche of Ramesses III on a lintel from Buhen.

Hori II is also attested in Sehel Island and Semneh.

Hori II was buried in Tell Basta. The tomb features a corridor made of baked brick opening up to three vaulted chambers on each side. The walls as well as the floors were all made of baked brick, presumably to provide some protection against the humidity in the Delta. The upper parts of the walls and the roofs were made of the more common mud-bricks.
