= Horrie Knight =

Australian businessman

- Born: Horace Raymond Knight; December 1, 1915; Adelaide, South Australia, Australia
- Died: June 6, 1990 (aged 74); North Adelaide, South Australia, Australia
- Other names: Horrie Knight
- Occupation: Grocer
- Spouse: Laurel Knight (m. 1940–1990)
- Children: 3

Horace Raymond Knight OAM (1 December 1915 – 6 June 1990) was a South Australian-born businessman (independent grocer) and philanthropist.

Knight spent much of his early life in Broken Hill, New South Wales. During World War II he served in the Australian Army 2/8th Field Ambulance and was a Rat of Tobruk.

On Knight's return, he began building a chain of self-service supermarkets starting in Prospect and subsequently in Salisbury and Elizabeth branded Foodland, Cheap Foods, or Half Case. The 6th store (Smithfield Plains) was opened by Don Dunstan in 1967 and attracted large crowds for the day. Knight would go on to open a further 3 stores, bringing the groups total to 9 stores by the early 1970s.

Horrie was well known for providing employment and generally being active in the community as he devoted a lot of time & money to local charitable organisations, namely Rotary. He became the president of the Rotary Club of Elizabeth in (1974/75) and a Paul Harris Fellow in 1979. In 1976 he was Elizabeth's first Citizen of the Year. In addition to his work with Rotary, Horrie was also a founding member of the Elizabeth & Districts Foundation, now known as the United Way (North), which is the largest non-government fund raising/giving organisation in South Australia.

He was awarded the Medal of the Order of Australia in 1990 for his lifelong commitment to charitable work in the northern suburbs of Adelaide, South Australia, but died before the presentation ceremony; (accepted posthumously by his wife).

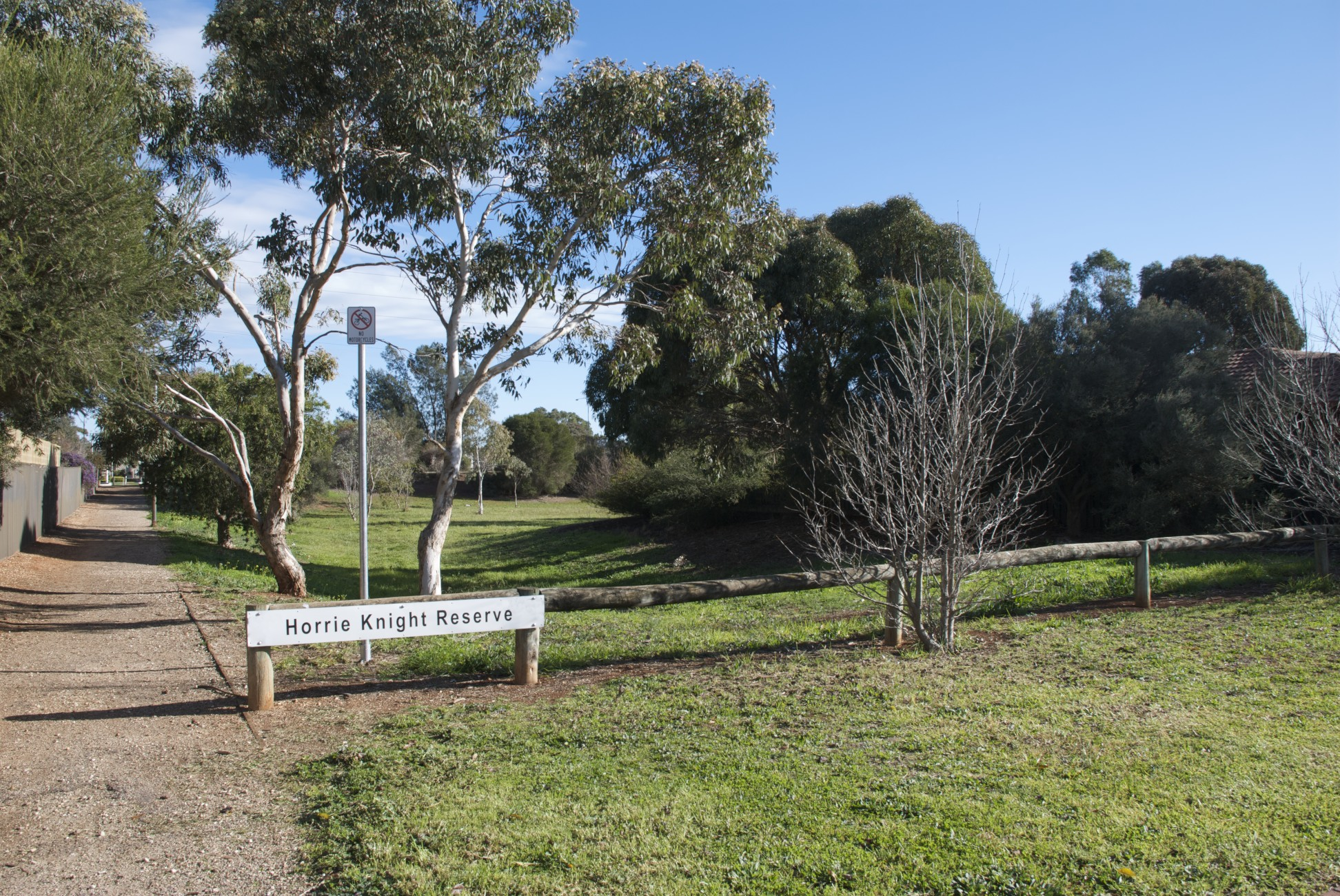
Horrie Knight Reserve, Blakeview, South Australia

Following his death, the H.R. Knight Memorial Trust was established to award individuals or groups who have made an outstanding achievement in the areas of education, arts, literature, music, athletics, and healthy amateur sport. It was administered by the Rotary Club of Elizabeth and until its closure in 2010, benefited many young people in the local area.

A reserve in Blakeview was named after Knight in 2004. The Horrie Knight Reserve can be found off Balmoral cct & Cherrytree cr in Blakeview. Knight also has a Crescent in the Playford Alive subdivision Smithfield Plains named in his honour.

Knight was married at the Adelaide suburb of Enfield on 16 November 1940 to Laurel Mary Hall and their marriage produced three children.
