= Horrie Weeks =

Australian rules footballer

Personal information
- Full name: Horace Leslie Weeks
- Born: 11 November 1895; Geelong, Victoria
- Died: 5 September 1962 (aged 66); Mordialloc, Victoria
- Original team: Melbourne District

Playing career^{1}
Years	Club	Games (Goals)
1915	Richmond	2 (3)
- ^{1} Playing statistics correct to the end of 1915.

Horace Leslie Weeks (11 November 1895 – 5 September 1962) was an Australian rules footballer who played with Richmond in the Victorian Football League (VFL).
