= Horrie Stevens =

Australian rules footballer

Personal information
- Full name: Horace Henry Stevens
- Born: 20 October 1912; Essendon, Victoria
- Died: 14 January 1940 (aged 27); Melbourne, Victoria
- Original team: Keilor / St Albans

Playing career^{1}
Years	Club	Games (Goals)
1934	North Melbourne	1 (0)
- ^{1} Playing statistics correct to the end of 1934.

Horace Henry Stevens (20 October 1912 – 14 January 1940) was an Australian rules footballer who played with North Melbourne in the Victorian Football League (VFL). He drowned in the Yarra River at the age of 27.
