= Horrie Quinton =

Australian rules footballer (1878–1912)

Personal information
- Full name: William Horace Quinton
- Born: 9 January 1878; Moorooduc, Victoria
- Died: 27 December 1912 (aged 34); Geelong

Playing career^{1}
Years	Club	Games (Goals)
1903–05	Geelong	35 (4)
- ^{1} Playing statistics correct to the end of 1905.

William Horace Quinton (9 January 1878 – 27 December 1912) was an Australian rules footballer who played with Geelong in the Victorian Football League (VFL).
