= Horrie Davis =

Australian cricketer

Personal information
- Full name: Horace Hyman Davis
- Born: 1 February 1889; Darlinghurst, New South Wales, Australia
- Died: 4 February 1960 (aged 71); Sydney, New South Wales, Australia
- Batting: Left-handed
- Bowling: Slow left-arm orthodox

Domestic team information
- Years: Team
- 1911/12–1924/25: New South Wales

Career statistics
Competition	First-class
Matches	12
Runs scored	403
Batting average	25.18
100s/50s	0/3
Top score	77
Balls bowled	126
Wickets	2
Bowling average	51.00
5 wickets in innings	0
10 wickets in match	0
Best bowling	1/6
Catches/stumpings	3/–
- Source: ESPNcricinfo, 8 November 2024

Horace Hyman Davis (1 February 1889 – 4 February 1960) was an Australian cricketer. He played twelve first-class matches for New South Wales between 1911/12 and 1924/25.
