= Hōri Tūpaea =

Hōri Tūpaea (1879–1944) was a notable New Zealand tribal leader and farmer. Of Māori descent, he identified with the Ngāti Te Whatuiāpiti and Ngati Kahungunu iwi. He was born in Te Hauke, Hawke's Bay, in about 1879. He was a great-grandson, through his mother, of Ngati Te Whatuiapiti chief Te Hapuku. His father, Hamiora Tupaea, was a younger son of the leading Tauranga chief Hori Kingi Tupaea of Ngāi Te Rangi.
