= Yoichi Hori =

Chairman and CEO of Subaru of America

Yoichi Hori is the chairman and chief executive officer of Subaru of America, overseeing all business operations in the United States.

== Early life and education ==
Hori grew up enjoying working with automobiles. He had experience as a mechanic and an auto racer. He attended Gunma University. Before working at Subaru, he worked at Fujitsu as Executive Vice President.

== Career ==
Hori has worked for Subaru since 1996, holding various roles in the U.S. and Japan, including roles in product and corporate planning. Before becoming CEO, he was deputy general manager for engineering and the general manager of the CTO Strategy Office for Subaru, focusing on their electrification strategy. He was appointed as CEO in May 2025 with some feeling his promotion is "a strategic reboot [for Subaru] to compete in the EV era"
