= Hori Kingi Tupaea =

Hori Kingi Tupaea (died 26 January 1881) was a Māori leader of the Te Whānau-a-Tauwhao hapu of Ngāi Te Rangi iwi of the western Bay of Plenty in New Zealand. Tupaea was born probably at Tauranga. He succeeded his father as the main leader of Ngāi Te Rangi in the 1830s.

In 1831 he and Te Waharoa of Ngāti Hauā defeated and destroyed a 150-strong war party of Ngāpuhi and Ngāti Kurī led by Te Haramiti at Mōtītī Island. Tupaea sold land at Maketu to Pākehā trader Phillip Tapsell in the early 1830s and the two were on good terms. In 1836 Tupaea supported Te Waharoa in an attack at Maketu that destroyed a Te Arawa pā and Tapsell's trading station. Tupaea saved Tapsell and his Te Arawa wife.

Tupaea did not sign the Treaty of Waitangi when it was twice presented to him in 1840. He was baptised by Anglican missionary Alfred Brown on 30 April 1848, taking the baptismal name of Hori Kingi (George King), and became a mission teacher. In the 1860s he got involved in the Pai Mārire religious movement, which resulted in him spending some time in prison. He became an assessor to the Native Land Court. He died on 26 January 1881 at Rangiwaea Island in Tauranga Harbour and was buried on Matakana Island.

One of his sons, Hamiora Tupaea, had an arranged marriage to Arihi Te Nahu of Ngāti Kahungunu, as part of peace-making between Ngāi Te Rangi and Ngāti Kahungunu. One of their sons was Hori Tupaea.
