= Horrie Stewart =

Australian rules footballer

Personal information
- Full name: Horace Stewart
- Born: 29 May 1871; Westbury, Tasmania
- Died: 14 July 1951 (aged 80); Auckland, New Zealand
- Original team: Launceston

Playing career^{1}
Years	Club	Games (Goals)
1898	Essendon	1 (0)
- ^{1} Playing statistics correct to the end of 1898.

Horace Stewart (29 May 1871 – 14 July 1951) was an Australian rules footballer who played with Essendon in the Victorian Football League (VFL).
