= Horrie Pearce =

Australian rules footballer (1886–1936)

Personal information
- Full name: William Horace Pearce
- Born: 2 July 1886; Eaglehawk, Victoria
- Died: 30 July 1936 (aged 50); Melbourne, Victoria
- Original team: California Gully

Playing career^{1}
| Years | Club | Games (Goals) |
| 1907 | Carlton | 2 (1) |
| 1909 | St Kilda | 5 (2) |
| Total | | 7 (3) |
- ^{1} Playing statistics correct to the end of 1909.

William Horace Pearce (2 July 1886 – 30 July 1936) was an Australian rules footballer who played with Carlton and St Kilda in the Victorian Football League (VFL).
