= Wentawat =

Ancient Egyptian official, Viceroy of Kush

- Viceroy of Kush
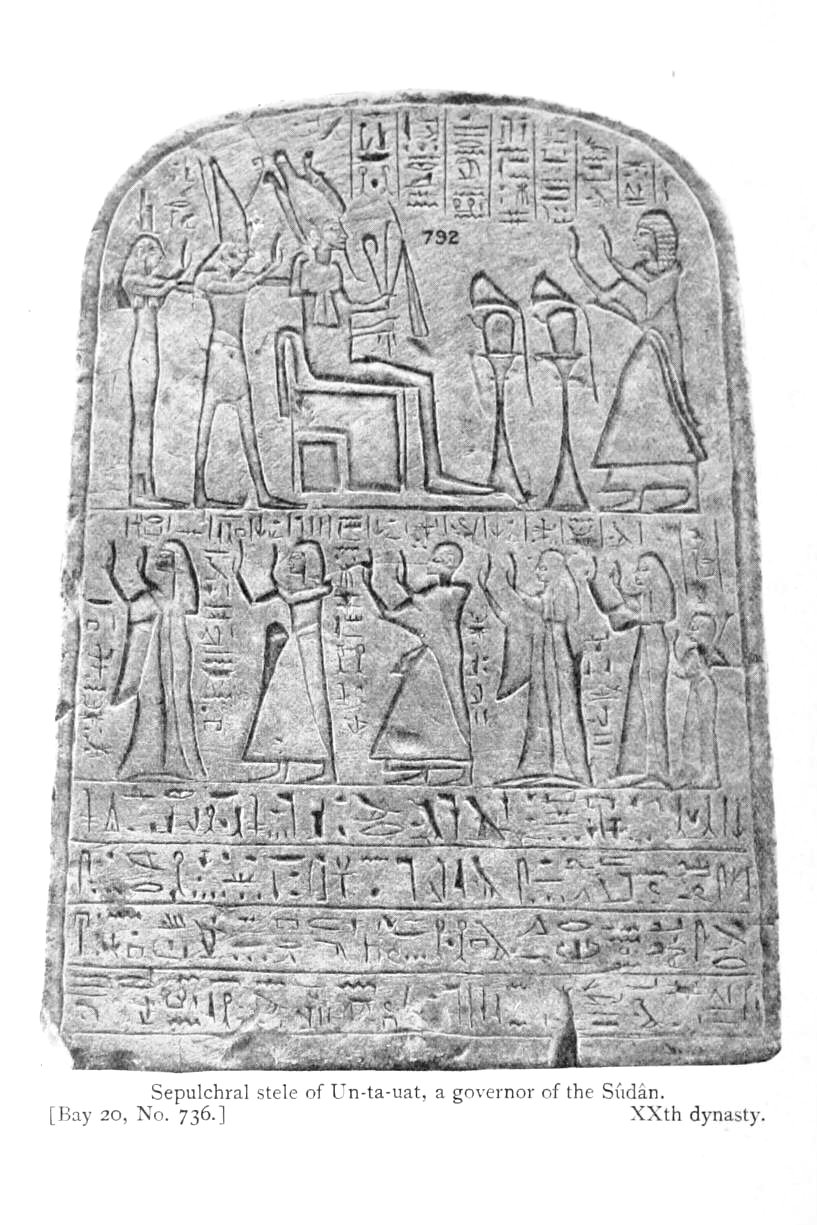
- Funerary stele of Wentawat, EA 792
- Predecessor: Nahihor
- Successor: Ramessesnakht
- Dynasty: 20th Dynasty
- Pharaoh: Ramesses IX
- Father: Nahihor
- Wife: Tausert
- Children: Ramessesnakht, Nahihor
- Burial: unknown

Wentawat (also written as Wentawuat), was Viceroy of Kush under Ramesses IX, during the 20th Dynasty. He was a son of the Viceroy Nahihor.

Wentawat's titles include: King's son of Kush, overseer of the Gold Lands of Amun-Ra King of the Gods, Head of the stable of the Court. First of His Majesty (i.e. charioteer), Door-opener, Steward of Amun at Khnum-Weset, High Priest of Amun of Khnum-Weset, First prophet of Amun of Ramesses.

He is known from a stela now in the British Museum (EA 792). This stela shows Wentawat, his wife Tausert (also written as Tawosret) and his son Nahihor (or Naherhu), who held the title of Head of the stable of the Residence. Another son, Ramessesnakht, succeeded his father as Viceroy of Kush, which makes for a viceregal 'dynasty' of three generations.
Wentawat is also known from a damaged granite statuette depicting him while kneeling and holding the figure of a god; it was found in 1902 interred inside the Karnak great temple, next to the 7th pylon. It is now located in the Egyptian Museum in Cairo (CG 42158 / JE 36816).
