= Horrie Bannister =

Australian rules footballer, born 1900

Personal information
- Full name: Horace Powell Bannister
- Born: 4 June 1900; Hawthorn, Victoria
- Died: 7 December 1978 (aged 78); Brighton, Victoria
- Original team: Brighton / Toora
- Height: 173 cm (5 ft 8 in)
- Weight: 70 kg (154 lb)

Playing career^{1}
Years	Club	Games (Goals)
1922–23	St Kilda	17 (4)
1924	Richmond	1 (0)
Total		18 (4)
- ^{1} Playing statistics correct to the end of 1924.

Horace Powell Bannister (4 June 1900 – 7 December 1978) was an Australian rules footballer who played with St Kilda and Richmond in the Victorian Football League (VFL).
