= Horrie Drane =

Australian rules footballer

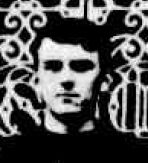

Personal information
- Full name: Horace George Drane
- Born: 15 February 1881; Albert Park, Victoria
- Died: 29 September 1965 (aged 84); Toorak, Victoria
- Original team: Leopold (MJFA)

Playing career^{1}
| Years | Club | Games (Goals) |
| 1902–1906 | Melbourne | 38 (11) |
| 1907–1909 | South Melbourne | 18 (1) |
| Total | | 56 (12) |
- ^{1} Playing statistics correct to the end of 1909.

Horace George Drane (15 February 1881 – 29 September 1965) was an Australian rules footballer who played with Melbourne and South Melbourne in the Victorian Football League (VFL). He was described as "a fine running player".

Drane took a while to establish himself at Melbourne, playing just twice in 1902 and no senior football in 1903. He then played regularly over the next three years before crossing to South Melbourne for the 1907 VFL season.

He was a member of South Melbourne's 1909 premiership team. Although he had played only once all year, in round 14, Drane was the beneficiary of Jim Caldwell's suspension and replaced him on the wing for the 1909 Grand Final. The 1909 Grand Final was his last VFL match.
