= Horrie Lyons =

Australian rules footballer

Personal information
- Full name: Reginald Horace Lyons
- Born: 4 January 1876; St Kilda, Victoria
- Died: 28 May 1921 (aged 45); Elwood, Victoria
- Original team: South St Kilda

Playing career^{1}
Years	Club	Games (Goals)
1895–1896	South Melbourne (VFA)	
1897	South Melbourne	5 (2)
1898	St Kilda	5 (1)
1899–1902	Prahran	
1903	Richmond (VFA)	18 (16)
1904	Prahran	
Total		28 (19)
- ^{1} Playing statistics correct to the end of 1904.

Reginald Horace "Horrie" Lyons (4 January 1876 – 28 May 1921) was an Australian rules footballer who played with South Melbourne and St Kilda in the Victorian Football League (VFL).

He commenced his football career with South Melbourne in 1895 and later played for Prahran and Richmond in the Victorian Football Association (VFA).
