= Horrie Webster =

Australian rules footballer

Personal information
- Full name: Horace Webster
- Born: 15 August 1888; Longford, Tasmania
- Died: 22 February 1949 (aged 60); South Melbourne, Victoria
- Original team: City (Launceston)
- Height: 185 cm (6 ft 1 in)
- Weight: 83 kg (183 lb)
- Position: Defence / ruck

Playing career^{1}
Years	Club	Games (Goals)
1913	South Melbourne	17 (13)
1914–15	Essendon	23 (13)
Total		40 (26)
- ^{1} Playing statistics correct to the end of 1915.

Horace Webster (15 August 1888 – 22 February 1949) was an Australian rules footballer who played with South Melbourne and Essendon in the Victorian Football League (VFL).
