= Horrie White =

Australian rules footballer

Personal information
- Full name: Horace Walter White
- Nickname: Horrie
- Born: 20 May 1892; Campaspe West, Victoria
- Died: 17 August 1959 (aged 67); Coburg, Victoria
- Original team: Brunswick Tramways

Playing career^{1}
Years	Club	Games (Goals)
1917–18	Carlton	4 (3)
- ^{1} Playing statistics correct to the end of 1918.

Horrie White (20 May 1892 – 17 August 1959) was an Australian rules footballer who played with Carlton in the Victorian Football League (VFL).
