= Horrie Trinder =

Australian rules footballer

Personal information
- Full name: Horace Silver Trinder
- Born: 29 August 1875; Hobart, Tasmania
- Died: 24 July 1956 (aged 80); Canning Vale, Western Australia
- Original team: My Lyell Association

Playing career^{1}
Years	Club	Games (Goals)
1902–03	St Kilda	10 (2)
- ^{1} Playing statistics correct to the end of 1903.

Horace Silver Trinder (29 August 1875 – 24 July 1956) was an Australian rules footballer who played with St Kilda in the Victorian Football League (VFL).
