= Horrie Dick =

Australian rules footballer

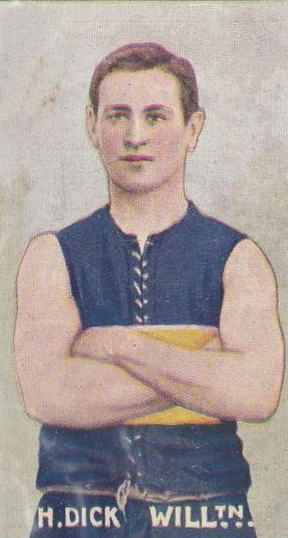
- Cigarette card of Dick in 1906

Personal information
- Full name: Horace Moir Dick
- Born: 16 June 1877; Geelong, Victoria
- Died: 20 January 1930 (aged 52); Dandenong, Victoria

Playing career^{1}
Years	Club	Games (Goals)
1907	Essendon	1 (0)
- ^{1} Playing statistics correct to the end of 1907.

Horace Moir Dick (16 June 1877 – 20 January 1930) was an Australian rules footballer who played with Essendon in the Victorian Football League (VFL). He also played for Williamstown in the Victorian Football Association from 1901 to 1906 (96 games, 42 goals) and was captain in 1905-06 and became the club's first-ever coach in 1906. Shortly after his one appearance for Essendon, Dick transferred to Footscray during 1907 and played 12 games for the Tricolours, kicking two goals. His final game was the first semi-final of 1907 where Footscray were defeated by Williamstown by 14 points, on their way to 'Town's first-ever VFA premiership.
