= Horrie Dawson =

Australian rules footballer (1910–1982)

Personal information
- Full name: John Horace McGregor Dawson
- Born: 23 April 1910
- Died: 2 September 1982 (aged 72)
- Original team: Old Scotch
- Height: 183 cm (6 ft 0 in)
- Weight: 80 kg (176 lb)

Playing career^{1}
Years	Club	Games (Goals)
1931–1940	Fitzroy	140 (62)
- ^{1} Playing statistics correct to the end of 1940.

John Horace McGregor "Horrie" Dawson (23 April 1910 – 2 September 1982) was an Australian rules footballer who played with Fitzroy in the Victorian Football League (VFL).

Dawson was the nephew of two Fitzroy premiership players, Fred Fontaine and Ern Jenkins. Recruited from Old Scotch, he started his career as a forward and was Fitzroy's second leading goal-kicker, behind Jack Moriarty, in 1932 when he kicked 21 goals. He followed it up with a 22-goal effort in the 1933 VFL season. Shifted to defence, Dawson did well in the 1934 Brownlow Medal count, with nine votes. He equaled that effort in 1937, which was also the year that he represented the VFL for the first time.
