= Hori (slur) =

Offensive term for Māori people

Hori is an ethnic slur used against people of Māori descent, accused of being dirty, rude or even disrespectful. The term comes from a Māori-language transliteration of "George", an English name that was very popular during the early years of European colonisation of New Zealand.

The usage as a derogatory term for Māori grew with the increasing urbanisation of Māori and is still common, though its usage may be less than in past decades. The level of offence implied by the use of the term has varied over time and with context. In the mid-1950s, there was a radio sketch "Dad and Hori" and in the early 1960s, the Pākehā writer W. Norman McCallum published several bestselling comedic books under the pseudonym "Hori". The pseudonym was chosen as a typical Māori name and the books depicted Māori as overweight, lazy, and happy-go-lucky.

In recent years amongst Māori it has to some extent been "reclaimed" by the community which it was originally intended to insult – being often used as a term of endearment or as a signifier of "keeping it real". An example is the musical group AHoriBuzz, the frontman of which describes the term as embracing Māori humour. This "reclamation" over the last 20 years has progressed so far that many youth may have no idea that the word is a racial slur.

== Etymology ==
In The Oxford Dictionary of New Zealandisms, the term Hori is defined as a direct "transliteration of George, a name adopted by Māori males from British royal use". Although initially used predominantly as the closest Māori translation of the word George, the term later evolved into an "informal offensive" descriptor for all Māori people. The exact timeframe in which the word Hori morphed from a simple transliteration into a universal racial slur towards Māori people is unspecified. Nonetheless, it is known that during the period of mass Māori urbanisation between 1950 and 1980, the usage and range of offensive and prejudiced Pākehā identifiers expanded. The newly urban Māori "were doubly alienated, as they were rejected by the dominant Pākehā culture", via the everyday use of racist slurs and characterisations such as Hori, and simultaneously removed from their cultural lands.

== History and meaning ==
The term Hori is recognised in academic and public discourses to be an ethnic and/or racial epithet directed towards the Māori people. The word Hori, when employed to refer to individuals of the Māori racial-ethnic identity or descent, has a pejorative and derogatory connotation. This connotation originated in colonial-era attitudes and racialised policies. For example, under the New Zealand Settlements Act 1863, native lands belonging to and occupied by different Māori tribes (iwi) and sub-tribes (hapū) were forcibly confiscated by the colonial New Zealand government. This land dispossession, together with the denial of other legal rights, despite the Treaty of Waitangi (1840), fostered the prejudiced characterisation that Māori people were second-class citizens or "sublegal". Building on this historic foundation, the modern meaning of the term is that the Māori subject is, "slovenly, unhygienic, poorly presented (personally and in their home or other possessions) and other similar socially inappropriate characteristics".

Brad Coombes, co-director of the Indigenous research initiative Te Whare Kura, says that the rise in popularity of the name Hori eventually led to the belief that, "all Māori could be nicknamed George/Hori". This increase in popularity and general usage coincided with an increase in Māori urban poverty during the 1950s–1980s; wherein, due to the loss of 95% of their native land, 60% of the Māori population moved from rural areas to lower-socioeconomic urban areas with "poorer housing". In the 1960s, John Foster noted that the social disadvantage and racial discrimination (e.g. being called a Hori) experienced by Māori people was not solely, "a function of their being Maori, but... instead, the result of being poor." As a consequence, the prejudiced view that all Māori were poor and “behaved in an ill-mannered, common, sublegal, and, albeit, jocular manner”, became encoded in the slur Hori and its use was normalised.

Despite the specific intention of the speaker varying person-to-person, Diane Blakemore, as well as other linguists and sociologists, posit that Hori: "is not simply an offensive attitude towards the particular individual who is being described as a hori, but more generally towards any person with this racial identity." The term is empowered by the wide variety of cultural stereotypes associated with Māori people in New Zealand social life. For instance, a common stereotype held by non-Māori students in New Zealand is that "all the Māoris are hori [poor and tough]", as well as aggressive and lazy in school.

== Usage ==
=== Politics ===
Historically, the racial epithet Hori was employed by white New Zealand subjects in order to degrade and socially marginalise Māori people in public life. In 1954, the white (or Pākehā) engineering student body at the University of Auckland commenced an annual tradition of performing a "mock haka", wherein the participants painted sexual iconography on their bodies and, in addition, chanted racial obscenities. The Auckland District Maori Council, in their submission to the Human Rights Commission (1979) investigating the mock haka, included one recorded chant:

Ka Mate! Ka Mate!

(Translated as Death! Death! accompanied by stamping feet and slapping thighs)

Hori! Hori!

(Translated as a derogatory name for Maori, accompanied with left hand patting head, right hand simulating masturbation)

I got the pox (venereal disease) from Hori! Hori!

The Pākehā students also wore grass skirts and carried mock taiaha, mimicking the stereotypical Māori savage and using the Hori slur to offend Māori onlookers. However, despite formal complaints from students in the Māori and Polynesian community, the university faculties held that the mock haka was, "too trivial a matter to investigate or to use their powers to intervene".

In 1978, Hilda Halkyard, a Māori university student and activist (later a member of He Taua), confronted the Pākehā students for performing their mock haka at the Auckland University Quad. The powerful imagery of Hilda publicly challenging the Pākehā students acted as a catalyst for future Māori led protests and was used in 'Anti-Racism Week' (c. 1979–80) posters on campus.

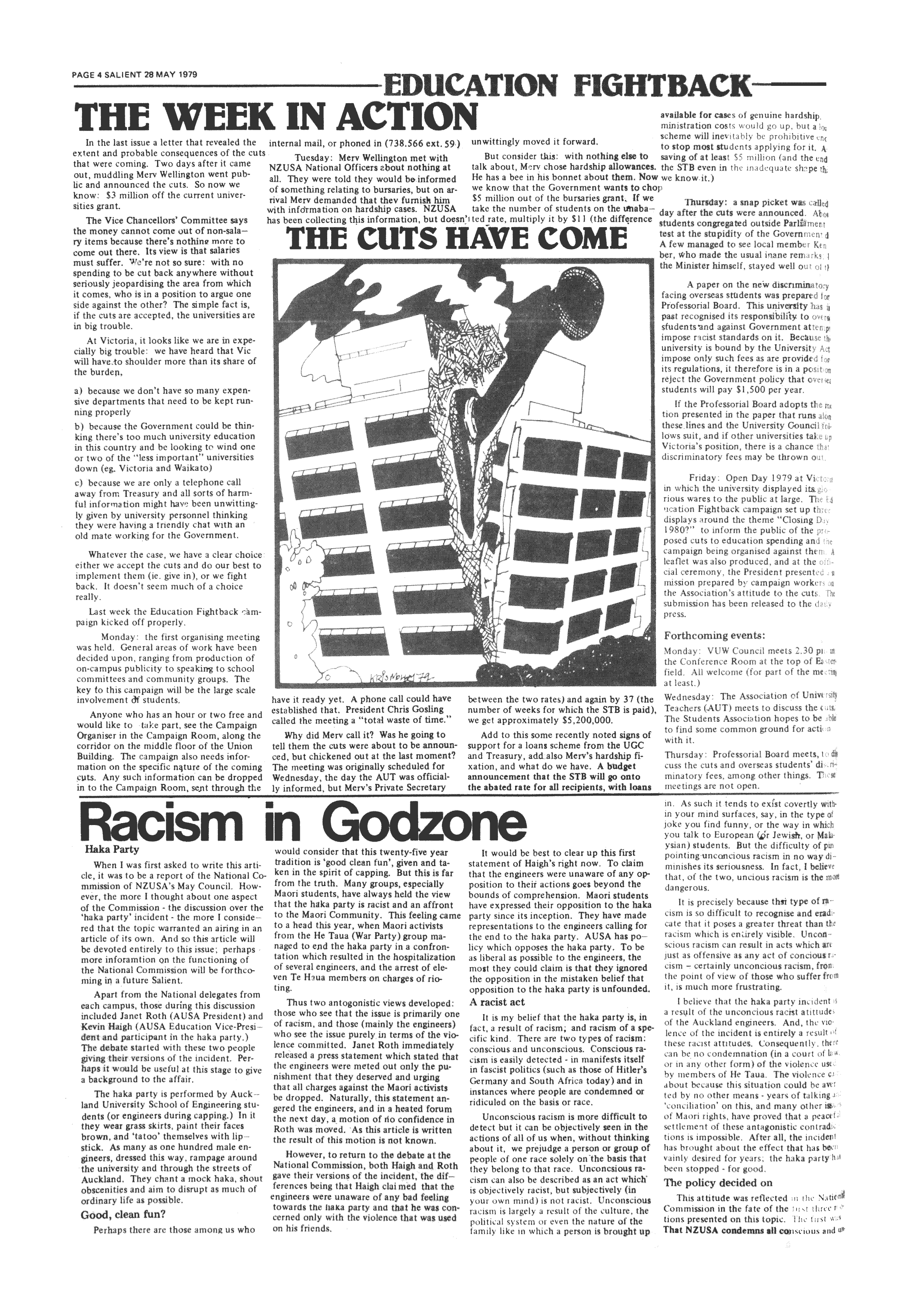
"Racism in Godzone", Stephen A'Court characterises the incident as racist (Salient. Newspaper of the Victoria University Students' Association, Vol 42 No. 11, 28 May 1979).

In 1979, in response to the lack of disciplinary action and/or intervention, a group of Māori and Polynesian protesters (He Taua) violently confronted the Pākehā students during a practice run of the mock haka. The incident was labelled by New Zealand media as both "the He Tau Incident" and "the Haka Party Incident", the former emphasising the He Taua's status as instigators, rather than the Pākehā student's racism. Reactions to the incident varied in news publications from measured sympathy, especially from Māori figures such as Ralph Hotere, to condemnation and total dismissal. Ben Couch, the Minister of Māori Affairs at the time, observed that the He Taua and Māori everywhere "should be able to laugh at themselves".

Following this incident, the Human Rights Commission investigated Māori-Pākehā relations at Auckland University and concluded, albeit critical of the physical violence, that the mock haka and use of the term Hori was "a form of cultural violence". The Race Relations Conciliator, in review of the Haka Party Incident, advised the Pākehā population to combat their own "casual racism" (e.g. the everyday use of the racial slur Hori) and to acknowledge instances of institutional racism (e.g. the mock haka).

=== Media ===
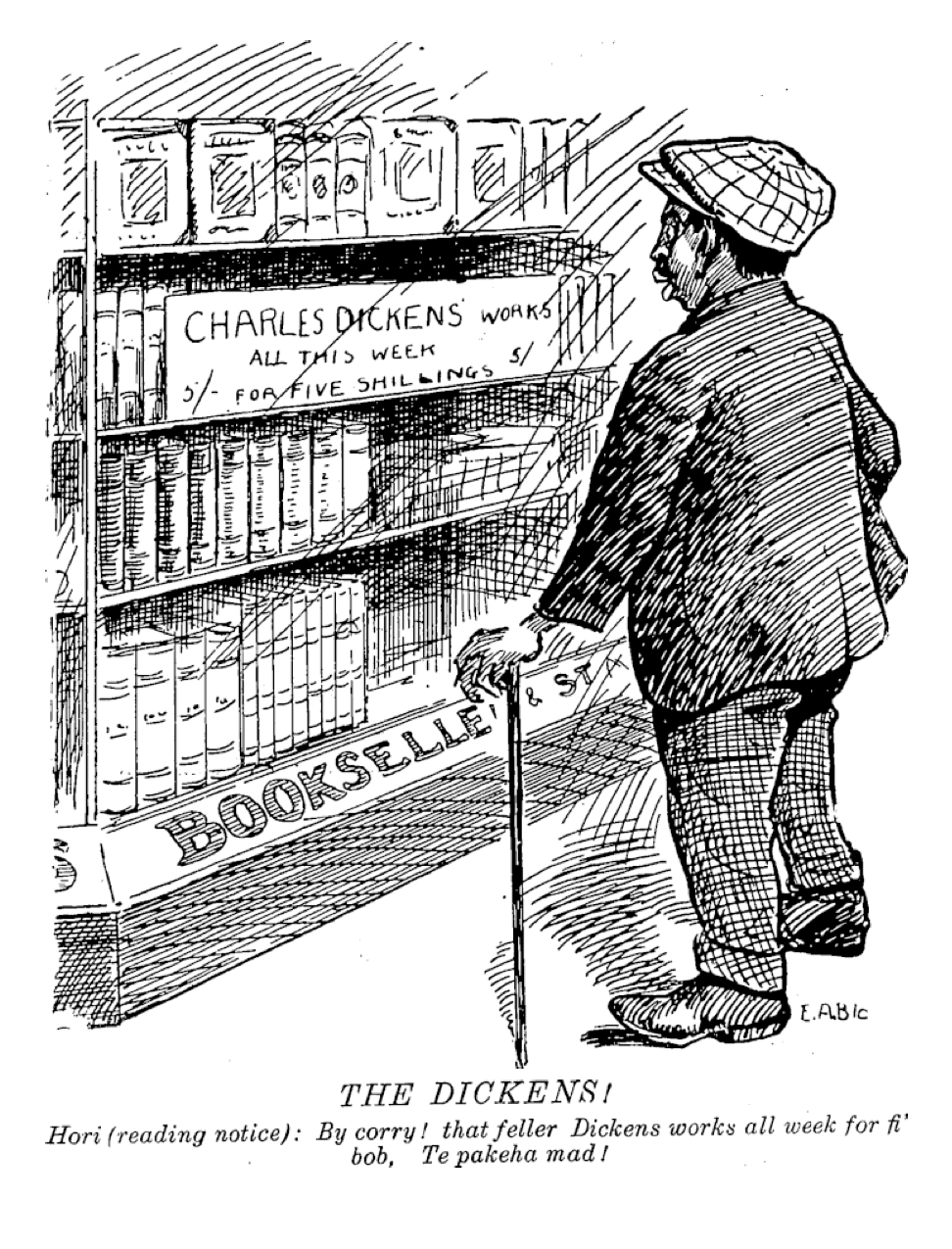
'Hori' reading notice (Observer, 4 July 1914)

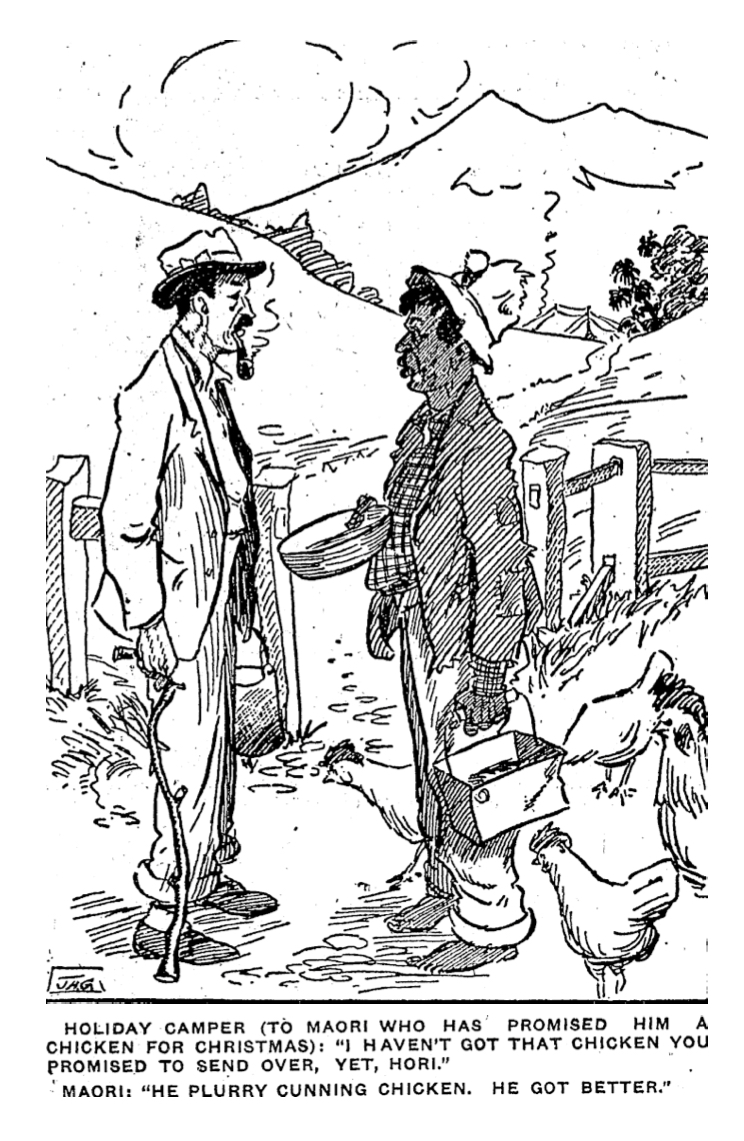
Pākehā calling a Māori man a 'Hori' (NZ Truth, 23 December 1922)

Originating in the 1860s, New Zealand newspapers and other publishers began to print fiction and editorial cartoons containing racist caricatures and stereotypes of Māori. During the colonial era, early Pākehā cartoonists and columnists stereotyped all Māori as violent savages and later, "doltish but cunning figures unwilling to part with their land." At the turn of the 19th century, drawing on the polygenism of colonial New Zealand, this stereotype developed to portray the Māori people as, "a vanquished degenerate race", who "all go back to the pā in the long run".

In the 1910s–1930s, Pākehā novels and editorial cartoons (e.g. in the Observer (1914) and New Zealand Truth (1922)) continued to degrade the unassimilated Māori for their laziness, stupidity and cunning. During this period, published Pākehā folk humour, present in both fiction and cartoons, began to label unnamed Māori characters 'Hori'. By means of synecdoche, this resulted in the term Hori capturing the range of negative stereotypes ascribed to the Māori (e.g. poor, stupid, etc.), within fiction and public life, by the white majority at the time, eventually transforming the term into a universal racial slur. For example, the white author and journalist Patrick Lawlor (1893–1979), in the 1920s–1930s, wrote three collections of short stories focused on multiple stereotypical 'Hori' characters: namely, Maori Tales: A Collection of over One Hundred Stories (1926), More Maori Tales: A Collection of over One Hundred New Stories (1927) and Still More Maori Tales: A Further Collection of over One Hundred Stories (1930). In the introduction of the first collection, Lawlor notes to the Pākehā reader that his main inspiration was the "guile and simplicity" of the Māori; and that the broken or Pidgin English spoken by 'Hori' is "suffice to supply the necessary 'atmosphere'..." of an authentic Māori character. The popularity of this genre of short stories helped to spread the racist "happy-go-lucky 'Hori' figure" and related stereotypes throughout New Zealand society. For instance, it popularised the stereotype that Māori men wore poorly fitting European clothing with bare feet, because of their slovenliness and stupidity.

In the 1960s, Wingate Norman McCallum, a non-Māori author of Scottish heritage, published a successful series of stories under the pseudonym 'Hori'. In the series, the central character is a stereotypical Māori man also called 'Hori', who has comedic experiences with his "too-tired-to-work brother-in-law" at the expense of neighbouring Pākehā and traffic cops. In 1962, the stories were collected in The Half-Gallon Jar, with illustrations (or racist Māori caricatures) provided by Frank St. Bruno, and sold over "68,000 copies". The success of the first compendium led to three further collections: namely, Fill it up Again! (1964), Flagon Fun (1966) and Flagons of Fun: Selected Stories from Flagon Fun, Half Gallon Jar & Fill it up Again (1968). The series functioned to reinforce multiple racist conceptions and stereotypes held by the white population in New Zealand, such as that the group identifier 'Māori' and the racial epithet Hori were equivalent and interchangeable. In 1963, John Rangihau (1919–1987), a Māori leader of the Ngāi Tūhoe iwi and academic, wrote that the series upheld the Pākehā mindset that viewed "all Maoris as lazy and unpunctual". In the 1960s, Graham Latimer (1926–2016), a prominent Māori land rights activist and leader, remarked that racial perceptions of the Māori were greatly affected by the success of the 'Hori' paperbacks. According to Noel Harrison, Latimer's biographer, whilst "few people read the Hunn Report on the state of Maori in 1960, many thousands laughed at the character named Hori, who came to represent one persistent stereotype of Maori", highlighting the exploitative power of racist Hori imagery in fiction.

== Cultural identity ==
The term Hori, albeit still functioning as a slur definitionally and in broader public spheres, has to some degree been "reclaimed" by Māori youth and incorporated into the modern Māori cultural identity with a positive connotation. For example, multiple ethnographic studies, relating to urban education and racialisation in the New Zealand education system, found that although, "... others label... [Māori people] 'hori' in a negative way, ... [a Māori student] later uses it with pride to refer to behaviours associated with her own Māori culture". The term has largely shifted into a positive form of self-identification in the Māori youth cultural identity, as "the phrase has almost become a badge of honor".

In popular culture, various Māori musicians and contemporary artists have also embraced the term, in order to reappropriate the meaning of Hori and diffuse its negative power. For instance, in 2012, activist Hohepa Thompson created the artistic label and studio HORI for the purpose of generating public debate about Māori cultural issues and social inequalities. Another example is the musical project AHoriBuzz by Māori musician Aaron Tokona, who claimed in an interview with Radio New Zealand that the name is about embracing the Māori sense of humour:

It didn't actually truthfully occur to me that it had racial ramifications about it until someone pointed it out in to me, because I don't live in that space... a Hori to me is the funniest sides of turning a coat hanger into a car aerial, that Billy T. James depicted so beautifully in his comedy sketches, you know? That's hori-as.

Tokona reclaims the racial slur Hori in his solo project AHoriBuzz by focusing on the positive aspects of the Hori figure depicted in classic Māori comedy. For example, in the second season of The Billy T. James Show, Billy introduced Te News, a parody of the Māori news bulletin Te Karere. Billy received criticism that he was further stereotyping the Māori people. He denied this and argued: "I think I've just come in in the middle of this quiet spot where everyone's too frightened to say anything, and just done it. There's still further to go."

== See also ==
- Boong, ethnic slur for Indigenous Australians
- Kanake, ethnic slur for Polynesians
- Redskin, ethnic slur for Native Americans
- Nigger, ethnic slur for African peoples
