= Hori I (Viceroy of Kush) =

Ancient Egyptian official

- Viceroy of Kush
- Predecessor: Seti
- Successor: Hori II
- Dynasty: 19th Dynasty
- Pharaoh: Siptah, Twosret, Setnakhte, Ramesses III
- Father: Kama
- Children: Hori II, Webekhuse(?), first charioteer of His Majesty, the king's messenger to everyland.
- Burial: Tell Basta (Bubastis)

Hori I, son of Kama, was Viceroy of Kush under Siptah and is attested in year 6 of that king. He likely continued to serve under Twosret, Setnakhte, and Ramesses III. Hori's titles include: King's Son of Kush, First charioteer of His Majesty, and King's messenger to every land. Hori I was succeeded by his son who was also called Hori.

Hori's tomb was found in Tell Basta.
