= Hori (entertainer) =

Japanese voice actor (born 1977)

- ホリ
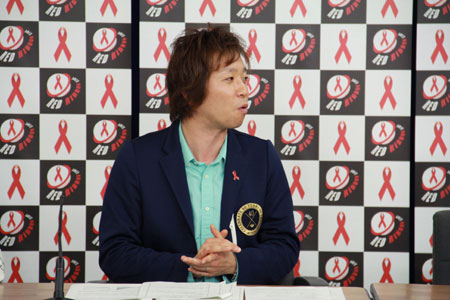
- Born: Hirohito Hori; 11 February 1977 (age 49); Shiroi (formerly Inba District, Shiroi), Chiba Prefecture, Japan
- Education: Nihon University Faculty of Law
- Occupation: Impressionist
- Years active: 1999–
- Agent: Horipro Com
- Television: Monomane Grand Prix; Hori Presents: Kyūjin Ninzaburō ga iku!; Monomane Ōzakettei-sen; Monomane Battle; TV oja Manbō; Kuchikomi Johnny; 2-ji-ciao!; Himitsu no chika rando; Shiodome Event-bu; Tokudane!
- Height: 1.73 m (5 ft 8 in)
- Awards: Nippon TV Manekin Manekin Box Champion Taikai Shodai Champion
- Website: Official profile

Hori (ホリ; born 11 February 1977, in Shiroi (formerly Inba District, Shiroi), Chiba Prefecture) is a Japanese impressionist (monomane tarento). His real name is Hirohito Hori (堀 裕人, Hori Hirohito).

Hori is represented with Horipro Com of Horipro.

== Biography ==
Hori was part of the handball club when he was at high school. He was also part of an advertising group during his college years and served as chairman during his third year. After graduating from university and worked as a salary worker at a sales promotion company Hori entered the entertainment industry. His first television appearance Waratte Iitomo!'s Shirōto monomane Corner. Hori also has experience as an anime voice actor and appeared in some works. His voice acting debut was Kinyō Road Show's Angel Tactics in 2005. Hori later voiced Junpei Takiguchi's "evil boss" roles in the Time Bokan Series after he died in 2011.

On 16 April 2005 during his final appearance in TV Oja Manbō he announced that he was married. From 20 February to 20 April 2006 Hori performed MSN's Hori no Bakushō monomane 100 Renpatsu

As Shiroi City furusato ambassador, he took the office at the Imprint of the Imperial Housekeeper as a police chief for a day at 4 October 2015, and called the crime prevention and people gathered for the Inzai Chiku Bōhan Festa 2015 held at a commercial facility in Inzai.

== Filmography ==
=== TV programmes ===
==== Current appearances ====
Regular programmes

Year	Title	Network	Notes
2015	Matsuko Kaigi	NTV	Narration
2015	Gogotama	TV Saitama	Thursday personality

Occasional programmes

Year	Title	Network
	Monomane Grand Prix	NTV
2014	Hori Presents: Kyūjin Ninzaburō ga iku!	CTC
	Monomane Ōzakettei-sen	Fuji TV

==== Former appearances ====
Year	Title	Network	Notes
	Warai no Kin Medal	TV Asahi	
	TV oja Manbō	NTV	
	Back Drop	NBN	
	Doubt o sagase!	TBS	Parody drama Doubt Luck!!
	Kuchikomi Johnny	NTV	
	Bakushō On-Air Battle	NHK-G	Knocked out with no wins and two losses; Record is 317 kb
	Ongaku nochi kara, Art nochi kara, karada nochi kara	NHK-E	
2008	Tamori no Vocabula Tengoku: Dai Fukkatsu-sai Spcecial	Fuji TV	Slogan is "Ningen Copy seizō-ki"
2008	The Iromonea	TBS	Appeared in Pinmonea, eliminated in the Final Stage
2009	Shinshun Golden Pink Carpet SP	Fuji TV	Slogan is "No Monomane No Life"
	2-ji-ciao!	TBS	Tuesday regular
	Monomane Battle	NTV	
	Tonneruzu no Minasan no Okage deshita	Fuji TV	Appeared in "Hakase to Joshu: Komaka sugite Tsutawaranai Monomane Senshuken"
	Nanikore Chinhyakkei	TV Asahi	As a representative of Gunma Prefecture
	Style Plus	THK	As part of Asarido
2010	Tōsō-chū	Fuji TV	As Mori Ōgai
2011	Ga Omou, Yueni ga Ramen	HTB	
2011	Yūsha Yoshihiko to Maō no Shiro	TV Tokyo	As Kisara; Episode 7
2011	Kushiro Area Kaikyoku Kinen Tokuban Ukaji-Hori-Gal Sone ga Iku Kushiro no Miryoku Hakken! Fureai Tabi	TVH	
2014	Shinobu Sakagami no Seichō Man!	TV Asahi	
	Kirameki-ippai Saitama-shi	TVS	
	Shiodome Event-bu	NTV	
	Himitsu no chika rando	NHK-E	Regular
	Tokudane!	Fuji TV	
	Bakushō Red Carpet	Fuji TV	Slogan is "No Monomane No Life"
	Nobinobi City Saitama-shi	TVS	
2015	Business Flash: Chiba Lotte Marines Special	CTC	

=== Radio ===
Year	Title	Network
2004	Hori no Super Hot News	NBS
	Tokyo Remix Zoku	J-Wave

=== Advertisements ===
Title	Notes
Shiseido uno	There was a limited version with Hori wearing Ojama Deka clothing from TV oja Manbō during NTV breaks
Tomy DX Kuwagattan and Bokan Brace	As Odayama

=== Anime television ===
Year	Title	Role	Ref.
2005	Angel Tactics	Tourist	
2015	Yatterman Night	Dokurobei	
2016	Time Bokan 24	Oyadama	

=== Anime films ===
Year	Title	Role
2006	Pokémon Ranger and the Temple of the Sea	Chatot

=== Films ===
Title
Barairo no Bū-ko

== Impressions ==
- Takaaki Ishibashi
- Ijiri Okada
- Miyuki Imori
- Udo Suzuki
- Yo Oizumi
- Cha Katō (The Drifters)
- Eiko Kano
- Takuya Kimura (SMAP)
- Yoshio Kojima
- Ayumu Goromaru
- Fumiyo Kohinata
- Masato Sakai
- Michiko Shimizu
- Ken Shimura (The Drifters)
- Shigeru Joshima (Tokio)
- Shōfukutei Tsurube II
- Junpei Takiguchi
- Tetsuya Takeda
- Dandy Sakano
- Hōsei Tsukitei
- Tetsurō Degawa
- Jimon Terakado
- Terry Ito
- Tonikaku Akarui Yasumura
- Akira Nakao
- Hanawa
- Masaru Hamaguchi
- Ai Haruna
- Eiji Bandō
- Bibiru Ōki
- Sei Hiraizumi
- Masaharu Fukuyama
- Takashi Fujii
- Gin Maeda
- Matsuko Deluxe
- Kunihiro Matsumura
- Monta Mino
- Hironari Yamazaki
- You
- Yūsuke Santamaria

== Discography ==
Title
Horineta

== Videography ==
Title
Hori monomane Tandoku Live: Honnin Fuzai! Cho, mateyo!!
