= Shigeyuki Hori =

- Education: University of Tokyo
- Engineering career
- Discipline: Bioengineering
- Significant design: Hybrid Synergy Drive
- Awards: TIME Innovators 2004; Wired Rave Awards 2005

Shigeyuki Hori is the principal designer of Toyota's acclaimed Hybrid Synergy Drive hybrid motor system which is in use by several vehicles including the Prius and Lexus RX Hybrid. An executive chief engineer in Toyota Motor Corporation, Dr. Hori served as chief engineer for more vehicles simultaneously than any other person in the company's history, by taking charge of the Prius, Celica, MR2, Caldina, Opa, Avensis, and Scion tC development efforts in the early to mid-2000s.

== Career ==
Shigeyuki Hori spent nine years studying at the University of Tokyo, where he earned a PhD in bioengineering. At Toyota Motor Corporation, he developed the Toyota Cost Calculation System, a method of determining the cost of each part that goes into a vehicle, and thus computing the total expense of building each car. Prior to this system, designers had estimated new car costs using prior comparison models. The development of the Toyota Cost Calculation System earned Dr. Hori the nickname "Dr. Cost-Magician" within the company, and he was given further vehicle development positions.

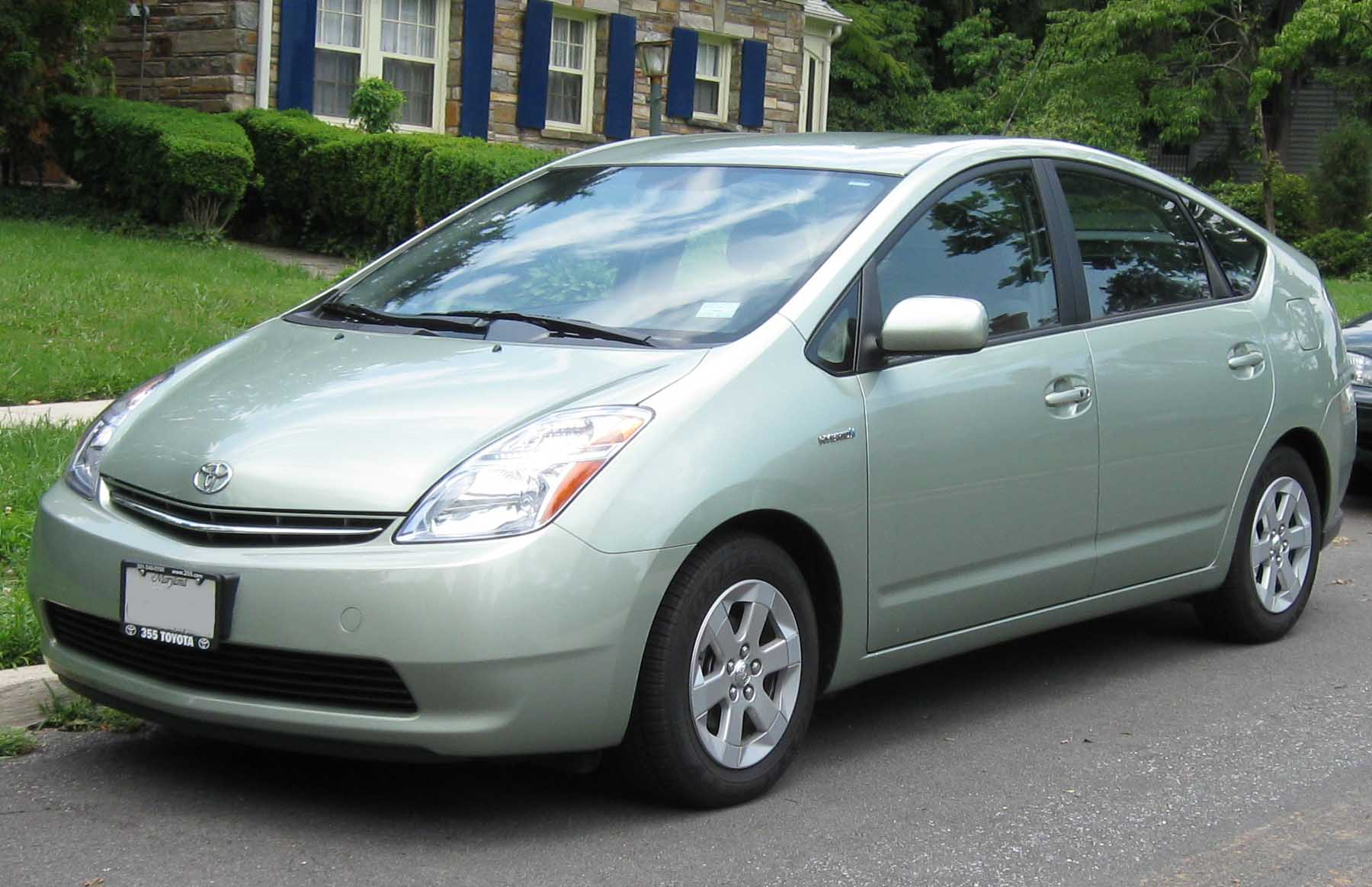
Dr. Shigyuki Hori headed development of the Toyota Prius

In the early 2000s, Dr. Hori was named executive chief engineer of the second generation Toyota Prius. He also took charge of the Celica and MR2 projects, destined for worldwide markets, the Avensis for Europe, the Caldina and Opa for Japan, and the Scion tC for the US. An avid test track driver, Dr. Hori alternated between his design duties and high-speed vehicle drives. At the culmination of the Toyota Prius development project, Dr. Hori and his team had amassed 530 patents for the Hybrid Synergy Drive system and other elements of the Prius design.
