= Horatio Gordon Robley =

British officer, cartoonist, collector and author (1840–1930)

Major-General Horatio Gordon Robley
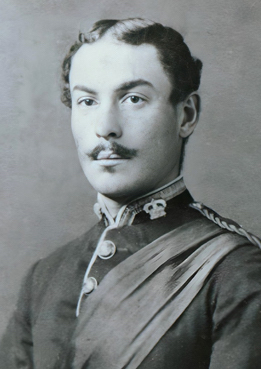
- Lieutenant Horatio Gordon Robley, 68th Regiment, Naples, 1867; Te Ao Mārama – Tauranga City Libraries
- Born: 28 June 1840; Funchal, Madeira
- Died: 29 October 1930 (aged 90); London
- Burial place: Streatham Park Cemetery, London
- Military career
- Allegiance: United Kingdom
- Branch: British Army
- Service years: 1858–1887
- Rank: Major-General
- Units: 68th Regiment; 91st Regiment
- Commands: 1st battalion Princess Louise's (Argyll and Sutherland Highlanders), 1882–
- Campaigns: New Zealand Wars; Tauranga; Gate Pā, 1864; Te Ranga, 1864
- Awards: New Zealand War Medal

Major-General Horatio Gordon Robley (28 June 1840 – 29 October 1930) was a British soldier who served in New Zealand, Mauritius, South Africa and Ceylon, then parts of the British Empire. He made drawings of Māori people and Māori culture and collected Māori items including almost three dozen Mokomokai, or mummified heads. His book Moko or Maori Tattooing is still considered a major work in the study of Tā moko.

== Early life ==
Robley was born at Funchal, Madeira, on 28 June 1840, the son of John Horatio Robley, a captain (retired) of the Madras Native Infantry, East India Company, and Augusta Jane Penfold (1809–1868), second daughter of William and Sarah Penfold of Madiera. Robley followed in his father's footsteps to be a professional soldier. However, he also inherited his mother's artistic skills, becoming an accomplished sketcher and watercolourist.

== Military career ==
In 1858 Robley purchased an ensigncy in the 68th (The Durham) Regiment of Foot (Light Infantry) for £450. That year, after a short period of training in Ireland, he joined his regiment in Burma.

=== East Indies ===
Whilst in Burma, Robley observed the people and learned the language. In addition to his military duties he continued with his sketching and made visits into the countryside to document daily life. When sketching Buddhist temples he became friendly with several Buddhist monks who tattooed an image of the Buddha, in red, on his right arm. It was said that this "would make him invulnerable to all weapons". This was the start of a lifelong interest in the practice of tattooing. The numerous sketches made during this period formed the basis for his illustrations some years later, when he was asked by the firm Cassells & Co. to contribute to their publication, Races of Mankind.

Robley returned home to England on sick leave between September 1860 and March 1861, where he began to specialise in rifle shooting, applying for and being granted a term in the School of Musketry. Rejoining his regiment in the East Indies in 1861, some years after the Indian Mutiny, he was assigned command of the guard placed over the last Mughal emperor, Bahadur Shah II, during his exile in Rangoon through to death in 1862.

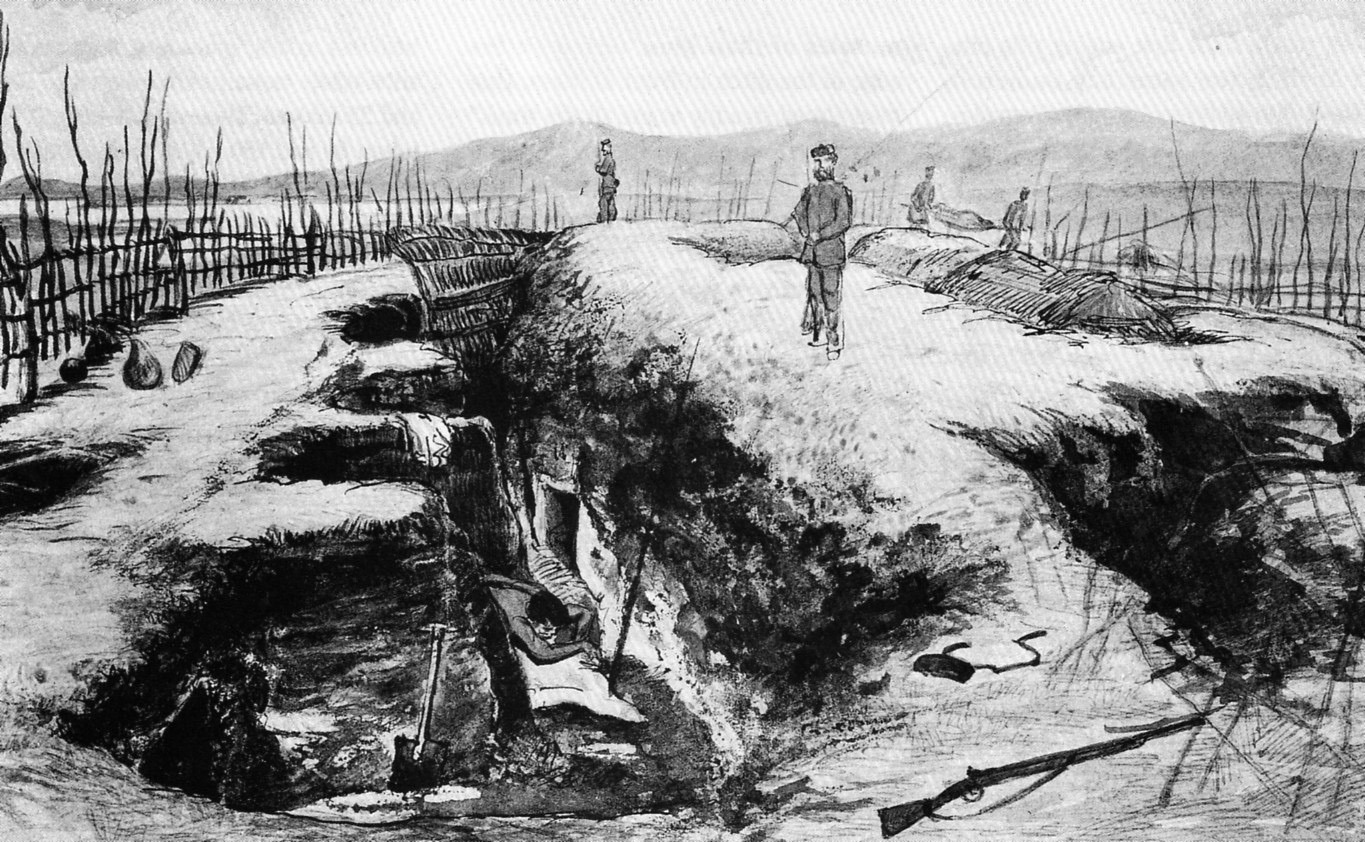
Pukehinahina / Gate Pā following the battle, 30 April 1864. Based on a sketch by H G Robley

=== New Zealand ===
In 1863, the 68th Regiment left Burma for the New Zealand Wars, landing at Auckland, New Zealand, on 8 January 1864. Again, displaying a desire to absorb his new surroundings, Robley purchased a Māori vocabulary and other books about Māori. In the following April, Robley took his troops to Tauranga to join General Cameron's forces at Pukehinahina / Gate Pā. Robley would sketch scenes of the battle as it was occurring, occasionally being fired at while doing so. British forces suffered a humiliating defeat in the Battle of Gate Pā on 29 April 1864, with 31 killed and 80 wounded despite vastly outnumbering their Māori foe. Gate Pā was the single most devastating defeat suffered by the British military in the New Zealand wars: while British casualties totalled more than a third of the storming party, Māori losses totalled about 25.

Robley remained at Tauranga for 19 months, until the beginning of 1866, during which time he continued drawing. He completed a series of detailed sketches of the Māori defences at Pukehinahina and continued his interest in tattooing and completed accurate sketches of the tattoo designs of the wounded and dead. Several of these scenes were later reproduced in The Illustrated London News between 1864 and 1867 and helped caused a backlash against the war among the British public.

During his time in New Zealand he had a relationship with a Māori woman named Herete Mauao, the daughter of a Rangatira, and they had a son whom they named Hamiora Tu Ropere. They were married under Māori law but not British law.

His regiment was withdrawn from Tauranga early in 1866 and sailed from Auckland arriving back in Spithead, England, on 28 June 1866.

=== Africa and Ceylon ===
In 1870 Robley purchased a captaincy for £1,100, and on 4 February 1871 transferred to the 91st (Princess Louise's Argyllshire Highlanders). He remained on Home Service until 1880, when he was promoted to major and dispatched to Mauritius. Later he was sent to South Africa and saw service in Cape Colony, Natal and Zululand. Promoted to the rank of Lieutenant Colonel in July 1881 and with the regiment designated the 1st battalion Princess Louise's Argyll and Sutherland Highlanders in July 1882, Robley assumed command during Lieutenant Colonel Alexander Bruce's leave from 8 November 1882, and was appointed command of the battalion in July 1883. That year, he and P J Aubin published their History of the 1st Battalion Princess Louise's Argyll and Sutherland Highlanders. Orders were received for Ceylon and then changed for Natal on 17 July. The battalion served in Ceylon from 1885 to 1888

In 1887, Robley retired from the army with the honorary rank of Major General and returned to live in London.

== Later life ==
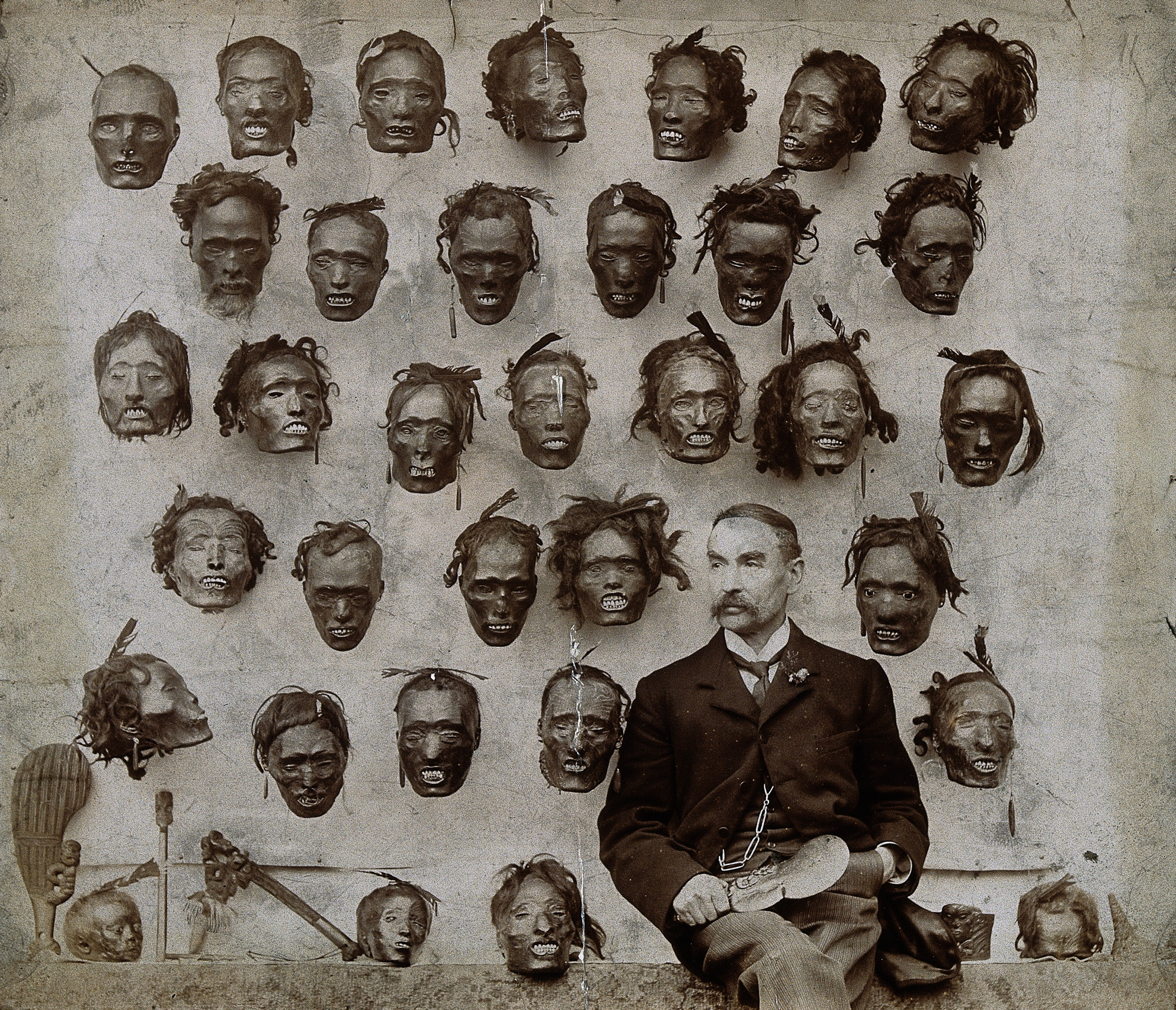
Horatio Gordon Robley with his Mokomokai collection, Circa 1895.

Continuing with writing after his retirement, he returned to his interest in tattoos and wrote two books relating to his time in New Zealand, Moko or Maori Tattooing in 1896 and Pounamu: Notes on New Zealand Greenstone. In the first book, as well as demonstrating and explaining the art of Māori tattooing, he also wrote chapters on the dried tattooed heads known as Mokomokai. Robley began collecting Mokomokai after becoming fascinated with the tattooing process on them, and at length built up a unique collection of 40 heads. Robley would often run out of money to purchase them with and would take out loans or barter with his belongings.

Robley also collected Māori antiquities. Some of his collection was purchased by the collector William Ockelford Oldman whose collection was purchased by the New Zealand Government in 1948.

Robley eventually wished to return to New Zealand and reconnect with his family, he tried to fund this by selling his Mokomokai collection. He offered them to the New Zealand Government for the equivalent price he had paid for them. After being rejected he offered the collection for £1,000 and a boat ticket to New Zealand; his offer, however, was refused again. Later, with the exception of the five best examples which Robley retained, the collection was purchased by the American Museum of Natural History, New York, for the equivalent of £1,250. By that point Robley had been beset by illness and additional financial problems and couldn't take a voyage to New Zealand.

After being unable to physical return to New Zealand he tried to establish correspondence with Herete only to discovered that she was dead, however he also found out that his son Hamiora had a family of his own. He sent letters to his granddaughter and offered to bring her to London for education, but she declined.

Robley maintained a lively correspondence with a number of New Zealanders and maintained close links with New Zealand House during his lifetime. He died in London on 29 October 1930 and is buried in an unmarked grave.

== Gallery ==
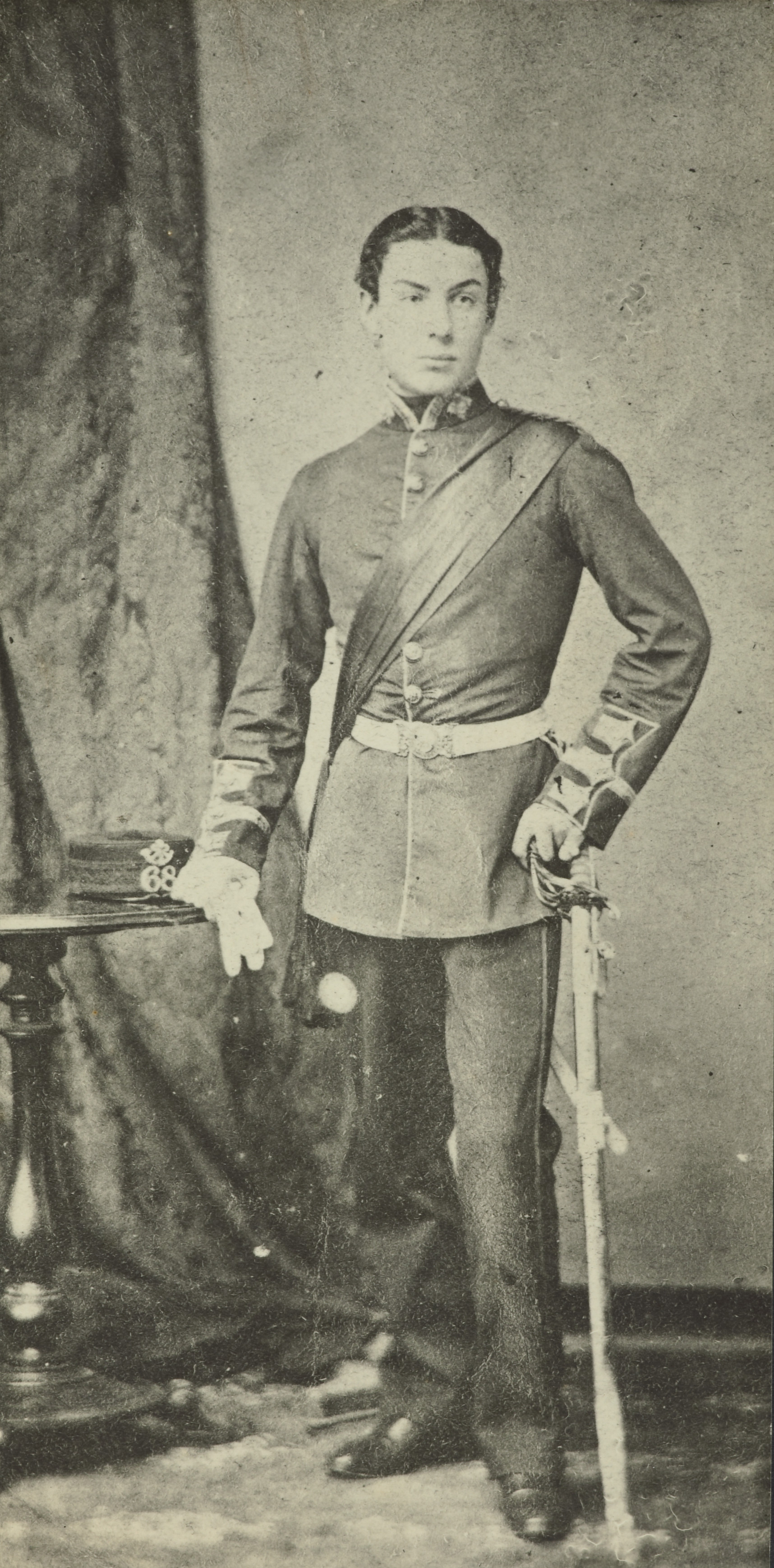
Ensign Robley, 68th Regiment, 1860

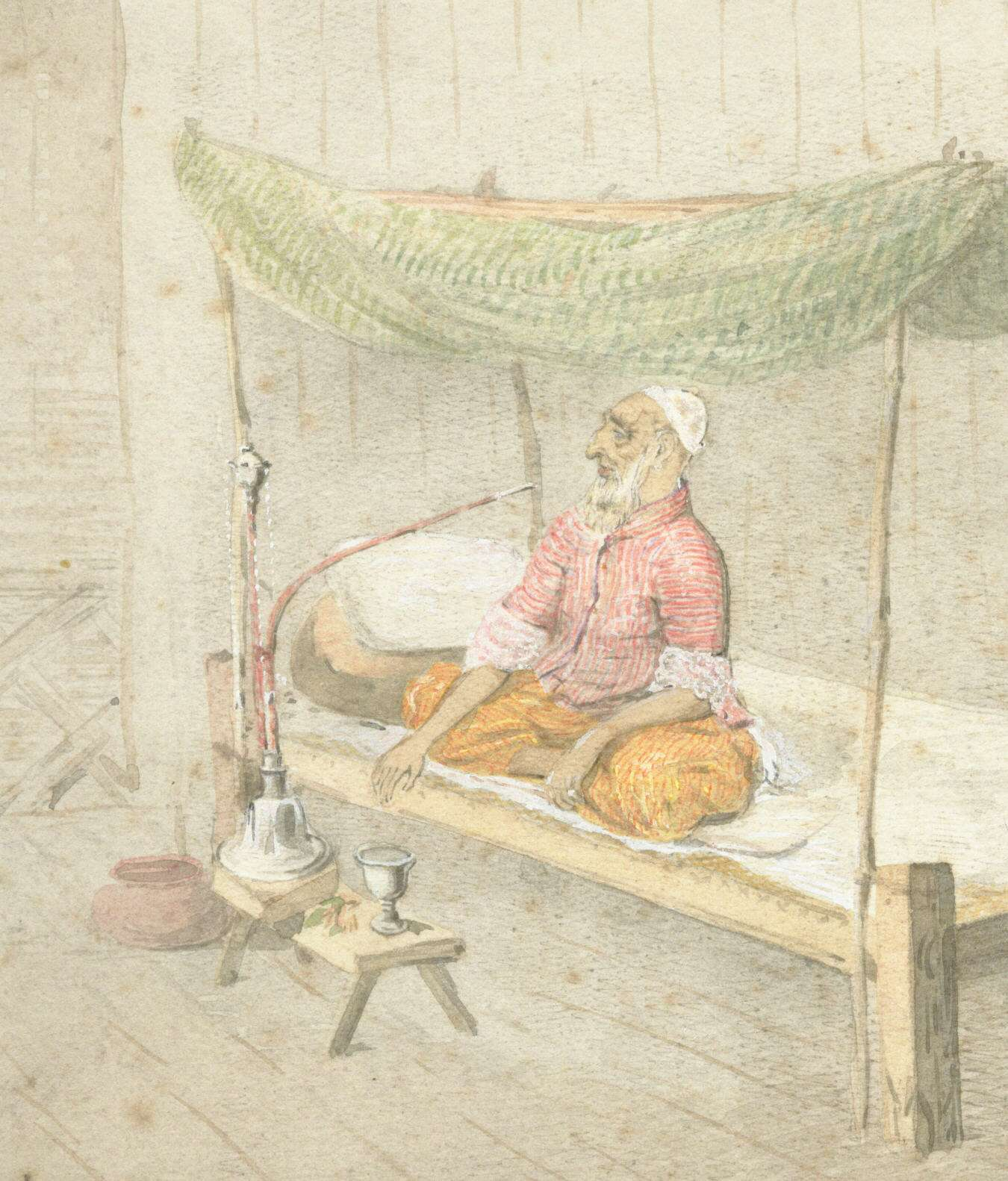
"The King of Delhi". Bahadur Shah II in exile. Artist: H G Robley

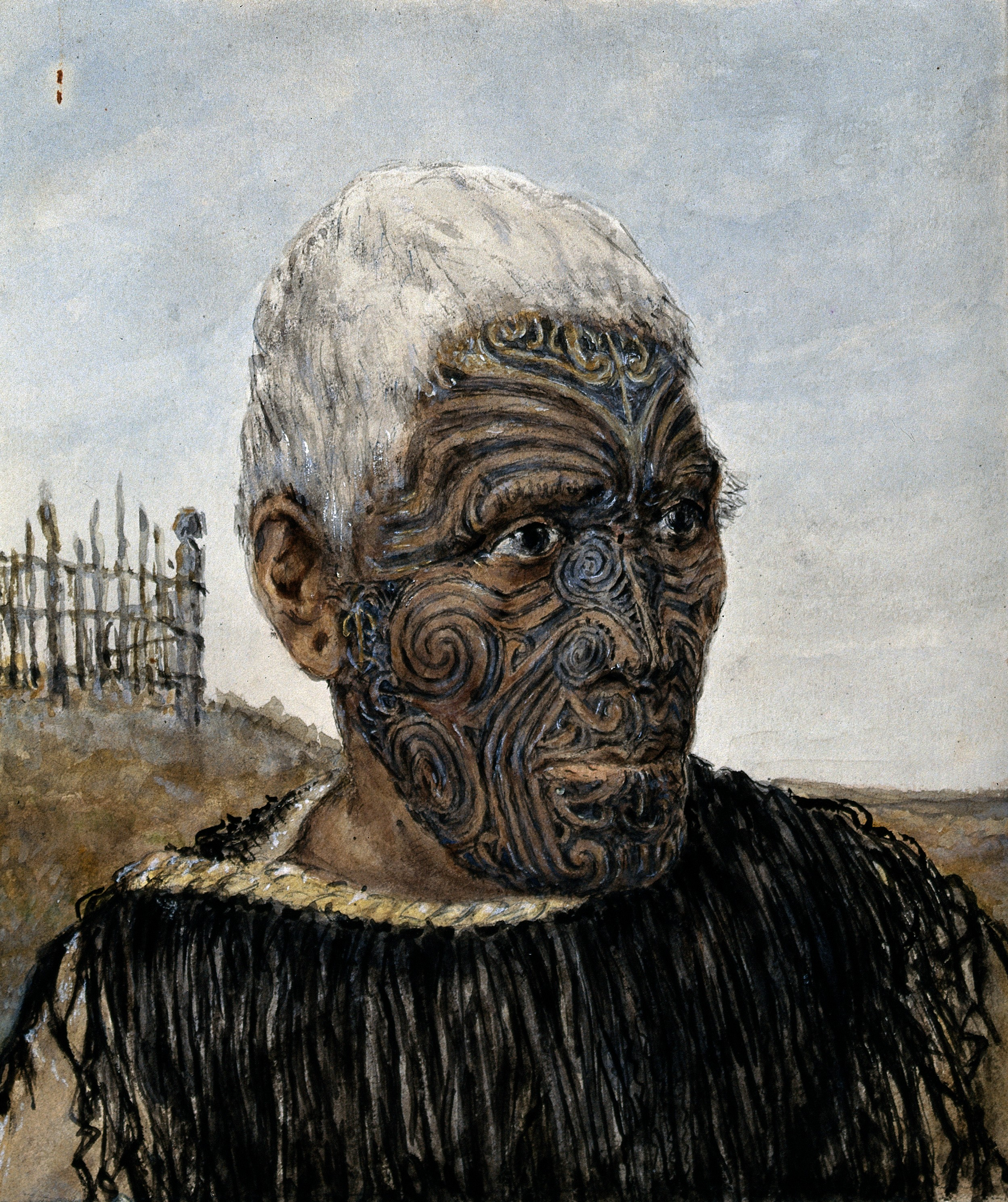
Te Manawa, Arawa
Artist: H G Robley

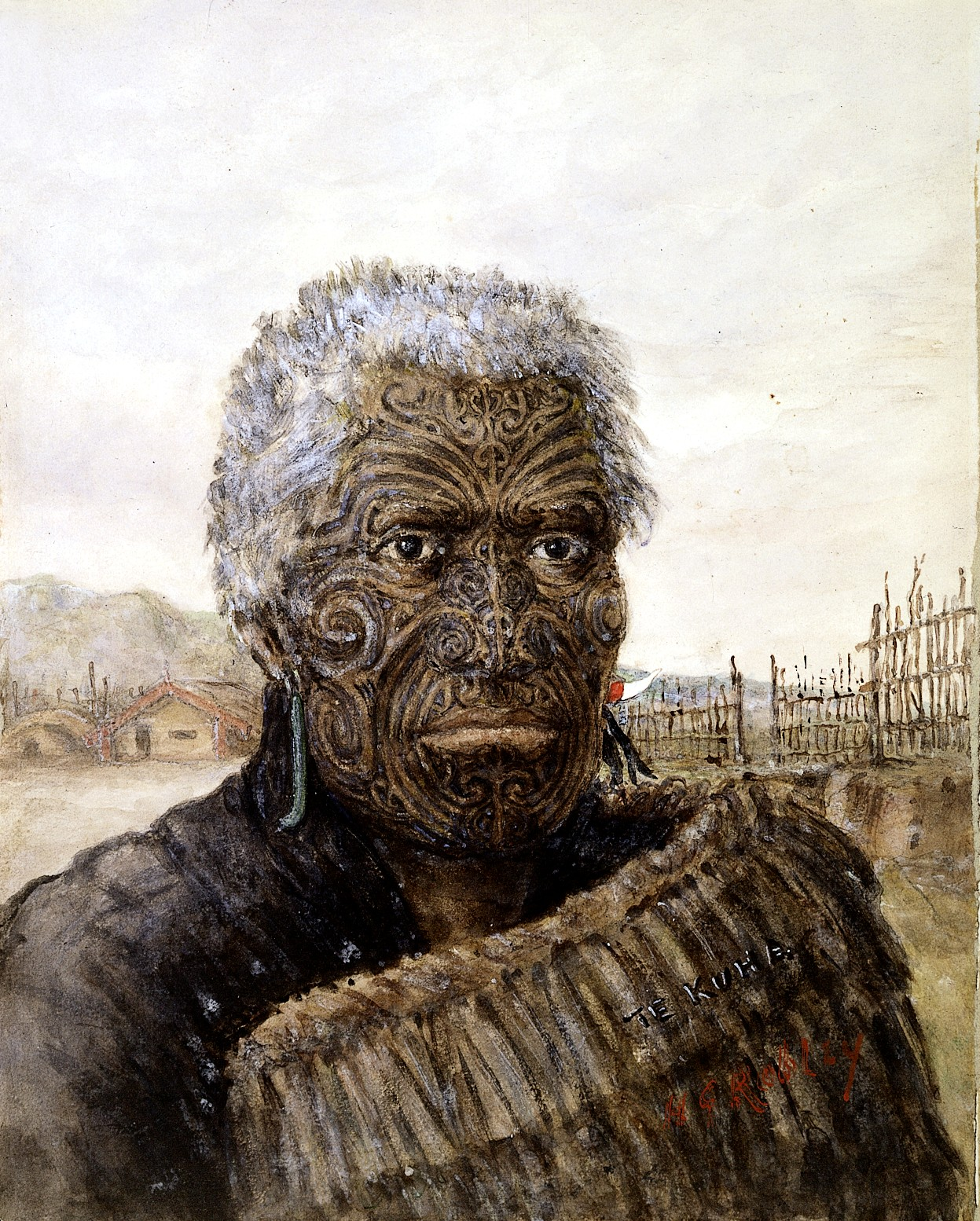
Te Kuha
Artist: H G Robley

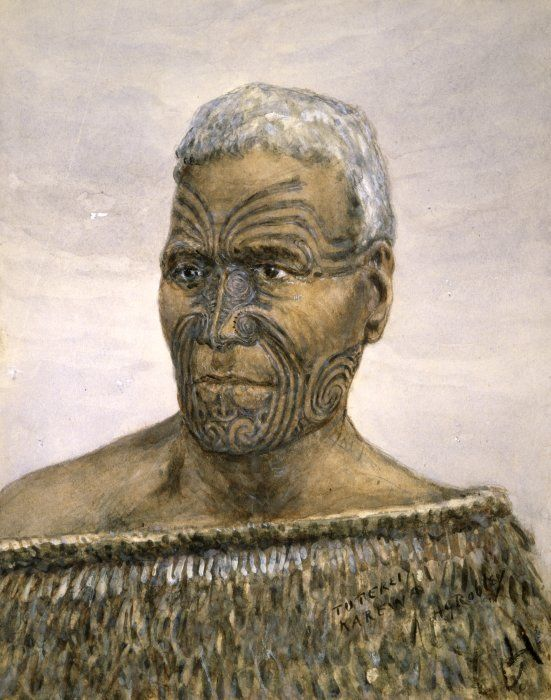
Tuterei Karewa, Ngāti Maru
Artist: H G Robley

Postcard featuring a warrior dancing in front of a pouwhenua.

Robley's illustration of 2 Māori women wearing Hei-tiki.

Watercolor rendition of a Puhoro thigh tattoo design by Robley.

== Publications ==
- Robley, Horatio Gordon; Aubin, P. J. (1883). History of the 1st Battalion Princess Louise's Argyll and Sutherland Highlanders. Cape Town: Murray & St. Leger, Printers.
- Robley, Horatio Gordon (1896). Moko; or Maori Tattooing. London: Chapman and Hall, Limited – via NZETC.
- Robley, Horatio Gordon (1915). Pounamu: Notes on New Zealand Greenstone. London: T. J. S. Guilford & Co. Ltd.
- Robley, Horatio Gordon (1931). "List of Mataora Patterns of Moko". Journal of the Polynesian Society. 40 (1 (157), March). Wellington: The Polynesian Society: 44–46. JSTOR 20702344.
