= Tuterei Karewa =

Māori chief

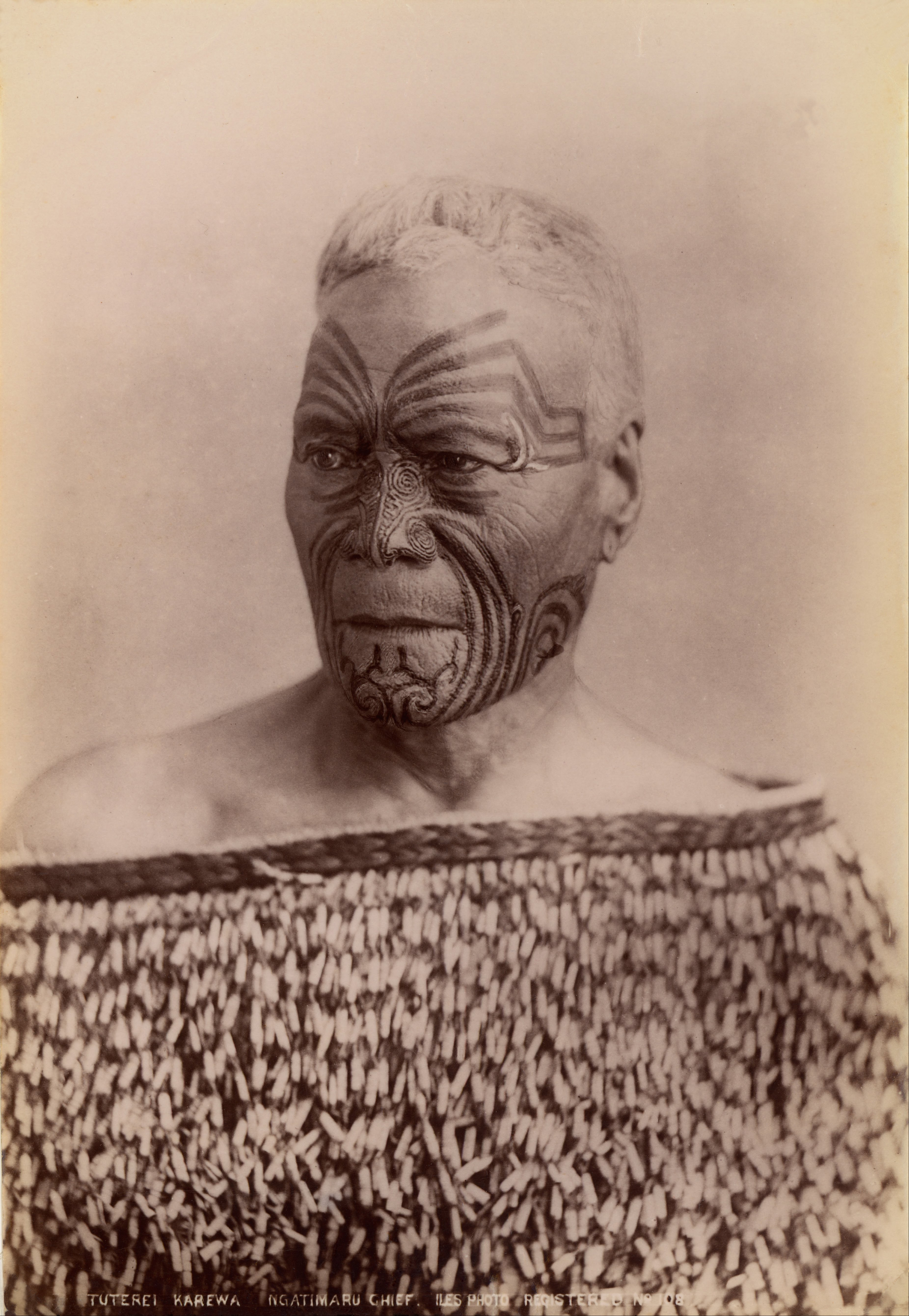
- Karewa, c. 1890–1920 with moko (facial markings) enhanced by the photographer

Ngāti Maru leader
- Preceded by: Ruangakau

Chief

Personal details
- Born: Tuterei Karewa Hauraki
- Relations: Teretiu Te Kupenga (Brother), Watene Te Wharemahihi Te Koau (Uncle)
- Mother tongue: Te Reo Māori

Tuterei Karewa was a chief and a warrior of the Māori iwi (tribe) called the Ngāti Maru. He has been depicted in multiple types of artwork, including photography, watercolor painting, and metalwork. The facial tattoo featured on his face, called a moko, features prominently in these depictions.

== Biography ==
Details regarding Karewa's birth and death are not documented. Karewa acted as a chief of the Ngāti Maru. Notes maintained by Māori historian W.T. Hammond noted that in the later part of his life, he was living in Kiri Kiri, Thames, and described him as a "handsomely tattooed old Maori warrior." In the 1860s, Karewa also had some political involvement regarding land ownership in New Zealand. Records indicate that in response to European interests in gold prospecting on their lands, Karewa participated in meetings of chiefs of the Hauraki region. Correspondences detailing these meetings indicate Karewa acknowledged European control over certain regions, but maintained that the Hauraki chiefs had independent land rights.

== Depictions in artwork ==
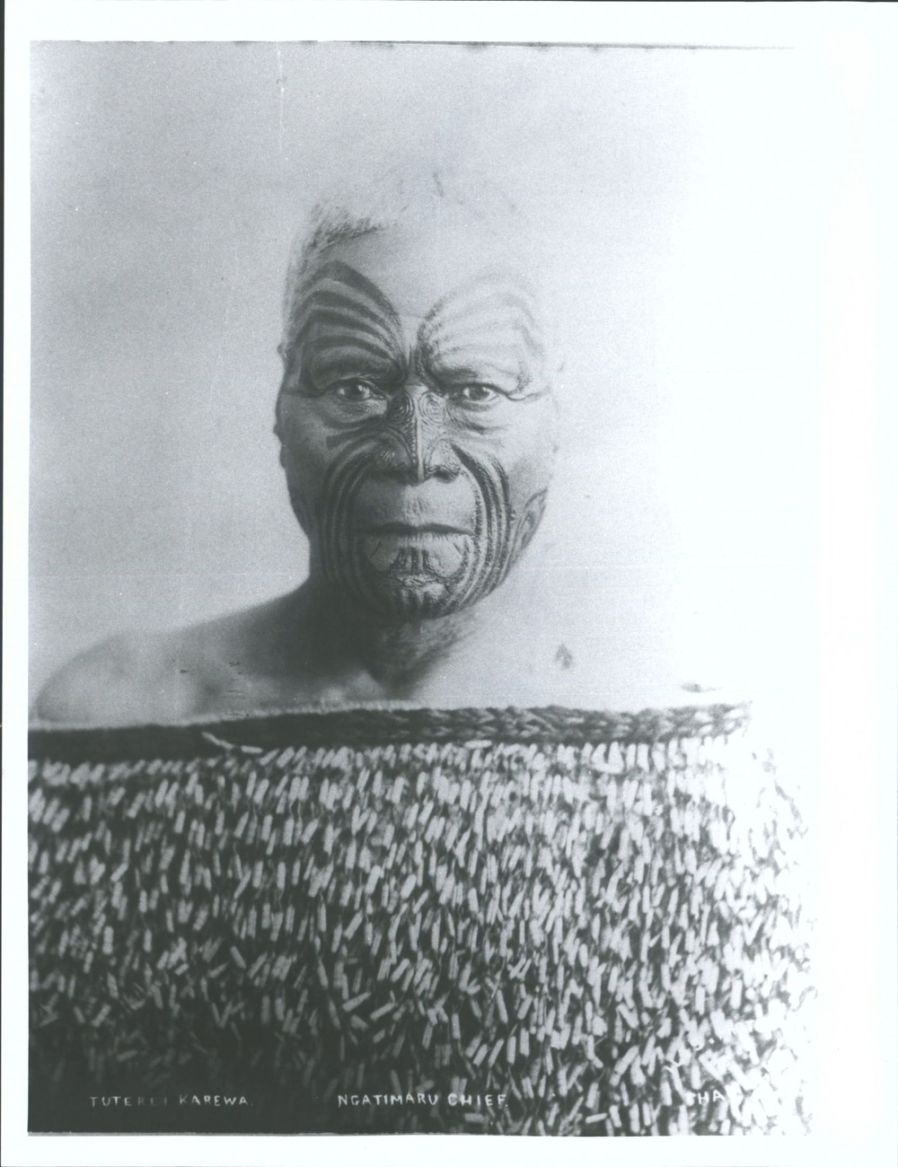
Tuterei, Karewa (ngatimaru chief) by Arthur James Iles

Karewa was the subject of several pieces of work. Photographer Arthur James Iles documented Karewa in a series of portraits of Māori between 1890 and 1920. The photograph shows Karewa wearing a pihepihe, a type of cloak generally adorned cylindrical tags made of flax. Iles subsequently used his work to have tin plates created overseas, one of which contained a small lithograph of Karewa on the outer edge of the plate among others. He was also the subject of a watercolor painting by artist and soldier Horatio Gordon Robley wearing a garment similar to the Iles photograph.

Reviews of these depictions sometimes comment on the nature of Karewa's face markings, called moko. In the photograph, reviewers have noted that Iles highlighted this tattoo after it was taken, possibly using black paint or another substance. The Oceanic Art Society praised the quality of the facial markings, commenting that Karewa showed the moko "to great advantage."

=== Gallery ===
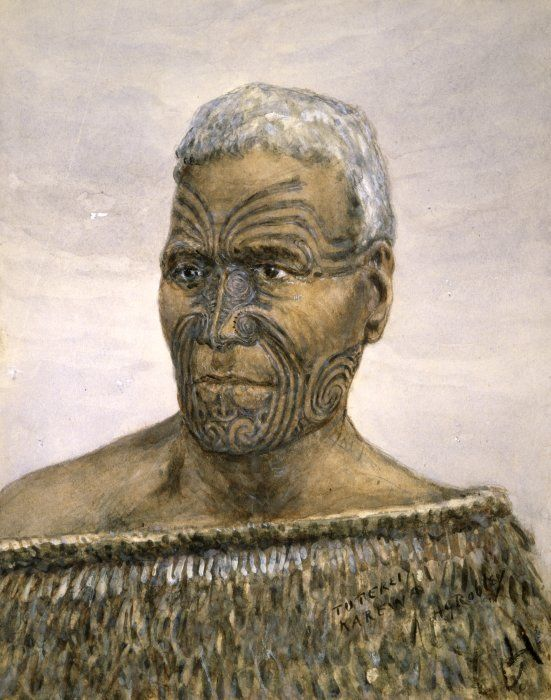
Watercolor and pencil, by Robley

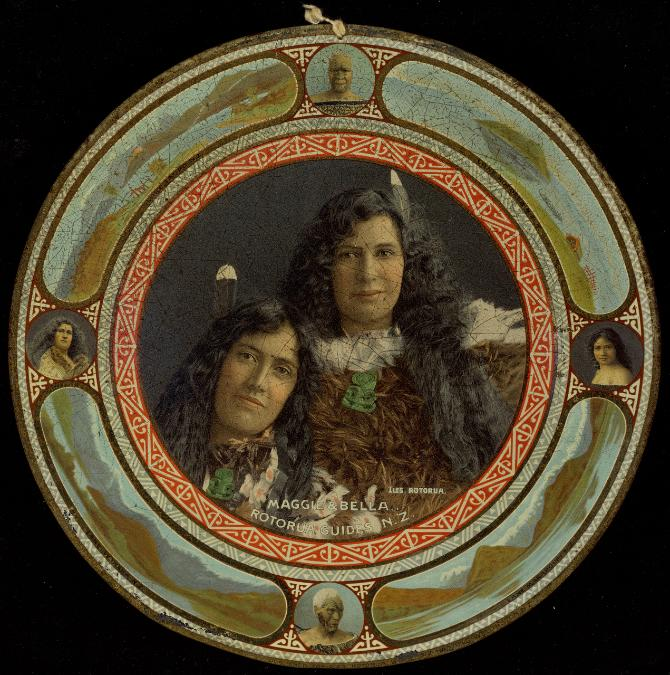
Tin plate featuring Karewa on outer rim.

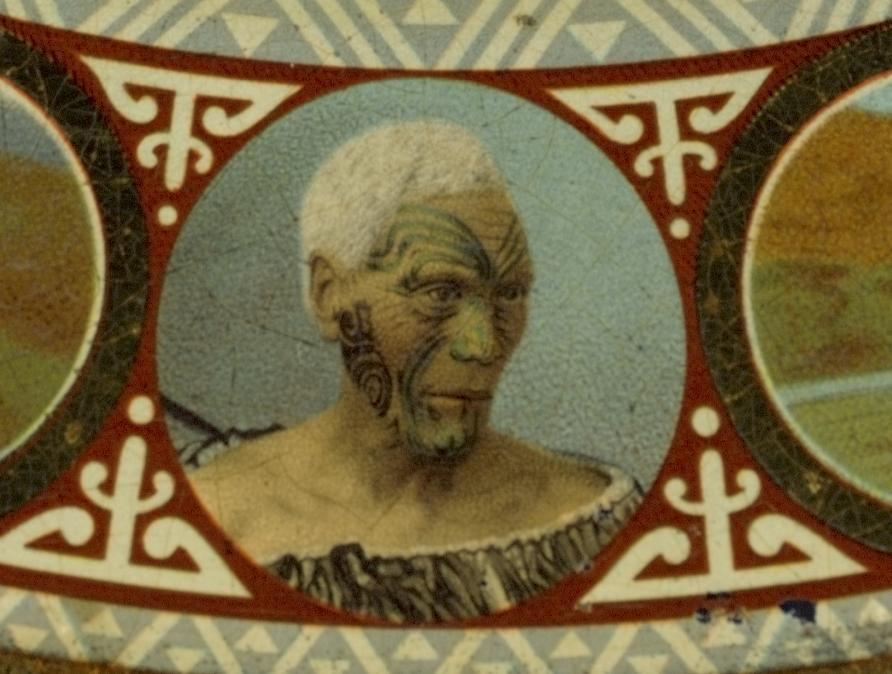
Tin plate rim, focused on portrait of Karewa

== Ancestry ==
Tuterei Karewa was the son of Ruangakau, a chief of Ngāti Maru, survivor of the Battle of Tōtara Pā, and Te Waimihi of Ngāti Whanaunga and Te Tini-o-Toi.

He had a brother Teretiu Te Kupenga, of which a number of families of Kirikiri and Thames descend from.

He and his brother descended from Tamatepō, Tamaterā, Whanaunga, and Tāurukapakapa, four of the five sons of Marutūāhu, as well as Takakōpiri of Waitaha-nui-a-Hei. He had connections to the Ngāti Te Aute hapū of Ngāti Maru, Ngāti Rautao hapū of Tamaterā, and the Ngāti Kotinga hapū of Ngāti Whanaunga.
