= Toi moko =

Preserved heads of Māori

Toi moko from the Robley Collection, 1908.

Toi moko, or mokomokai, are the preserved heads of Māori, the indigenous people of New Zealand, where the faces have been decorated by tā moko tattooing. They became valuable trade items during the Musket Wars of the early 19th century. Many toi moko were bought or taken from their family and homeland by whites. In recent decades Te Papa has launched a campaign to repatriate toi moko to Aotearoa.

== Moko ==
Moko facial tattoos were traditional in Māori culture until about the mid-19th century, when their use began to disappear. There has been something of a revival from the late 20th century. In pre-European Māori culture, they denoted high social status. Generally only men had full facial moko. High-ranked women often had moko on their lips and chins. Moko tattoos served to identify connection between an individual and their ancestors.

Moko marked rites of passage for people of chiefly rank, as well as significant events in their lives. Each moko was unique and contained information about the person's rank, tribe, lineage, occupation and exploits. Moko were expensive to obtain and elaborate moko were usually limited to chiefs and high-ranked warriors. Moreover, the art of moko, the people who created and incised the designs, as well as the moko themselves, were surrounded by strict tapu and protocol.

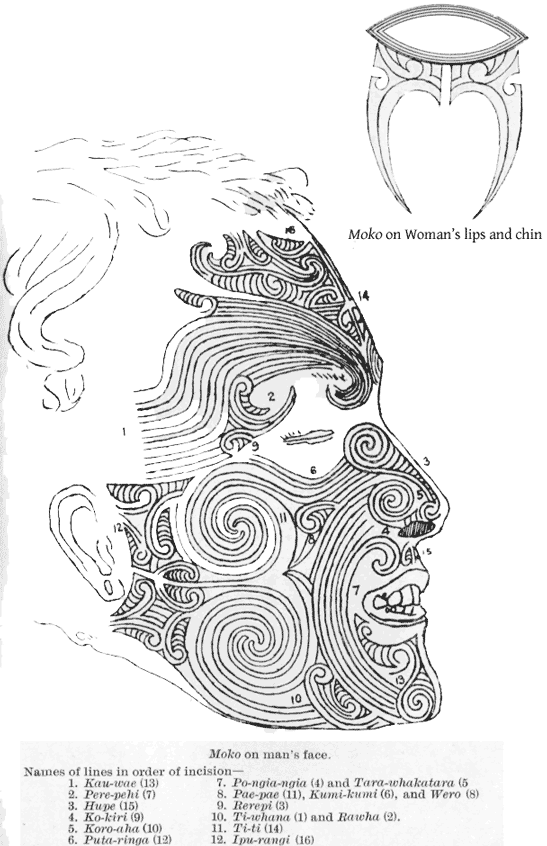
Moko design

== Mokomokai ==
When someone with moko died, often the head would be preserved. The brain and eyes were removed, with all orifices sealed with flax fibre and gum. The head was then boiled or steamed in an oven before being smoked over an open fire and dried in the sun for several days. It was then treated with shark oil. Such preserved heads, toi moko, would be kept by their families in ornately carved boxes and brought out only for sacred ceremonies. During the preservation process the curers and relatives were supposed to fast until after the head was finished. Rarely attempts were made at preserving the eyes but only 3 examples are known to have succeeded, one of which partially.

The heads of enemy chiefs killed in battle were also preserved; these toi moko, being considered trophies of war, would be displayed on the marae and mocked. They were important in diplomatic negotiations between warring tribes, with the return and exchange of mokomokai being a bargaining chip as well as an essential precondition for peace. When enemy heads were displayed on spikes they were known as turuturu.

Rarely women would have their heads made into toi moko, this could occur to either those who achieve positions of power or the wives and relatives of chiefs who wished to preserve their faces. Only one female toi moko was ever traded.

== Musket Wars ==
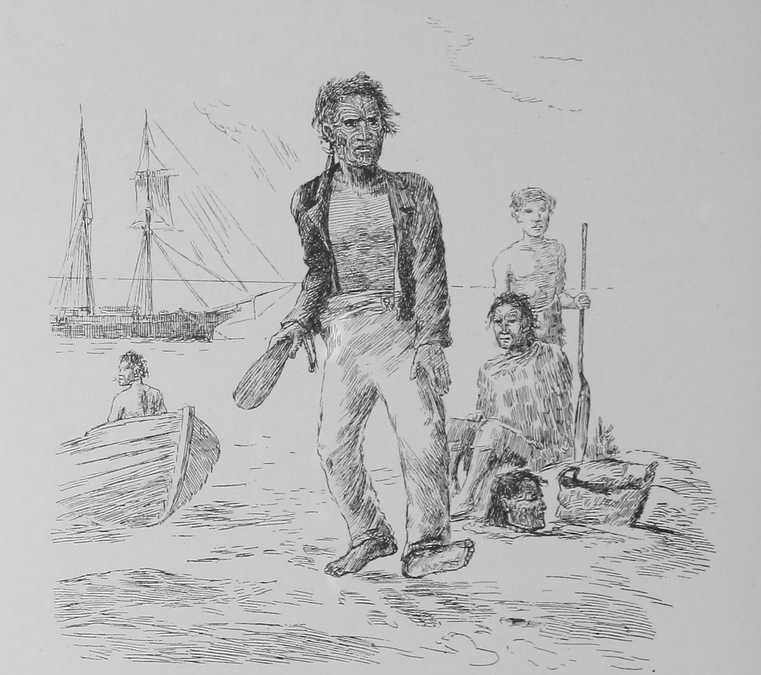
"Bargaining for a head, on the shore, the chief running up the price" – 1896 sketch by H. G. Robley

Trading these heads with Westerners apparently began with Sir Joseph Banks, the botanist on HMS Endeavour, when he traded old linen drawers (underwear) for the head of a 14-year-old boy. The head was traded as a "curio" and a fascination with the heads began to grow. This continued with mokomokai heads being traded for muskets and the subsequent Musket Wars. During this period of social destabilisation, toi moko became commercial trade items, which could be sold as curios, artworks and museum specimens that fetched high prices in Europe and America, and could be bartered for firearms and ammunition.

The demand for firearms was such that tribes carried out raids on their neighbours to acquire more heads to trade for them. While most early toi moko sold to Europeans were slain warriors, eventually demand from European traders outstripped supply, so the heads of slaves and prisoners were tattooed (though with meaningless motifs rather than genuine moko) in order to provide heads to order. There were also some Europeans who had their heads tattooed and turned into toi moko as well.

The peak years of the trade in mokomokai were from 1820 to 1831. On 16 April 1831, Ralph Darling, the Governor of New South Wales, issued a proclamation banning further trade in heads out of New Zealand saying that there was reason to believe that the trade tended to increase the sacrifice of human life. In New Zealand, Māori, concerned that heads were being traded, gradually ceased to preserve them.

During the 1830s the demand for firearms diminished because every surviving group was fully armed. By 1840 when the Treaty of Waitangi was signed, and New Zealand became a British colony, the export trade in mokomokai had virtually ended, along with a decline in the use of moko among males in Māori society, although occasional small-scale trade continued for several years.

== End of the practice ==
The outlawing of the trade caused mokomokai making to enter a decline. During the New Zealand wars colonial soldiers killed by Māori could have their heads turned into mokomokai, with the last Instance occurring in March of 1865. Ethnographer Elsdon Best claimed the last known creation of toi moko happened in 1865 with the heads of two Ngāti Manawa chiefs being preserved.

== Robley collection ==
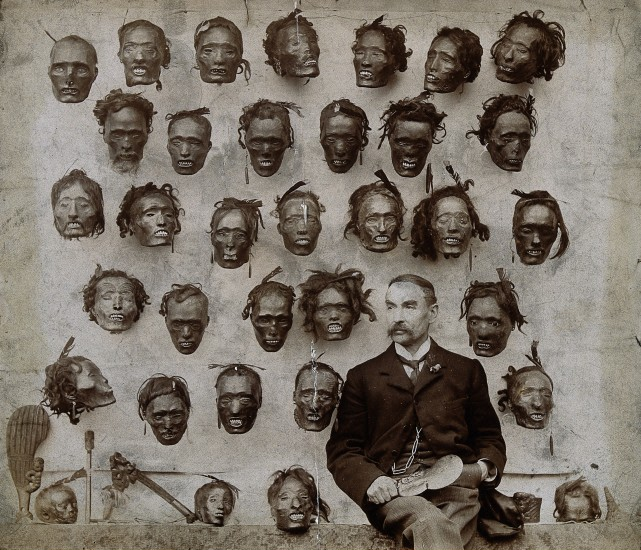
Robley with his mokomokai collection

Major-General Horatio Gordon Robley was a British army officer and artist who served in New Zealand during the New Zealand Wars in the 1860s. He was interested in ethnology and fascinated by the art of tattooing. He wrote Moko; or Maori Tattooing, which was published in 1896, the book features extensive illustrations of moko designs and documented all toi moko he knew of at the time. After he returned to England he built up a collection of 35 to 40 mokomokai which he later offered to sell to the New Zealand Government. When the offer was declined, most of the collection was sold to the American Museum of Natural History. The collection was repatriated to Te Papa Tongarewa in 2014.

== Repatriation ==
More recently there has been a campaign to repatriate to New Zealand the hundreds of toi moko held in museums and private collections around the world, either to be returned to their relatives or to Te Papa for safe and respectful storage, not on display whilst efforts are made to research the individuals' heritage and contact their descendants. It has had some success, though many toi moko remain overseas and the campaign is ongoing. Many international bodies have repatriated toi moko from their collections including institutions in Great Britain, United States of America, Netherlands, Argentina, Australia, Canada, Germany, Sweden, Norway, France, and Austria. The organisations who repatriated their toi moko and the dates can be found on Te Papa's website.

An example of these repatriations comes from the small English seaside town of Scarborough, North Yorkshire. In 1834 a toi moko was traded from Kāpiti Island and brought to England, later to be donated to the museum at Scarborough by Richard Baley Munn, master of the brig 'Eleanor', where it stayed, sometimes on display, until 1998 when it was repatriated to Te Papa through the High Commission of New Zealand. Although an important item in the collection of the museum, the knowledge of the toi moko was lost after the repatriation and was not uncovered for approximately 40 years, when Jacob Smith, intern at the museum from the University of York, rediscovered its history and the journey it took.
