= Kōrere =

Traditional Māori feeding funnel

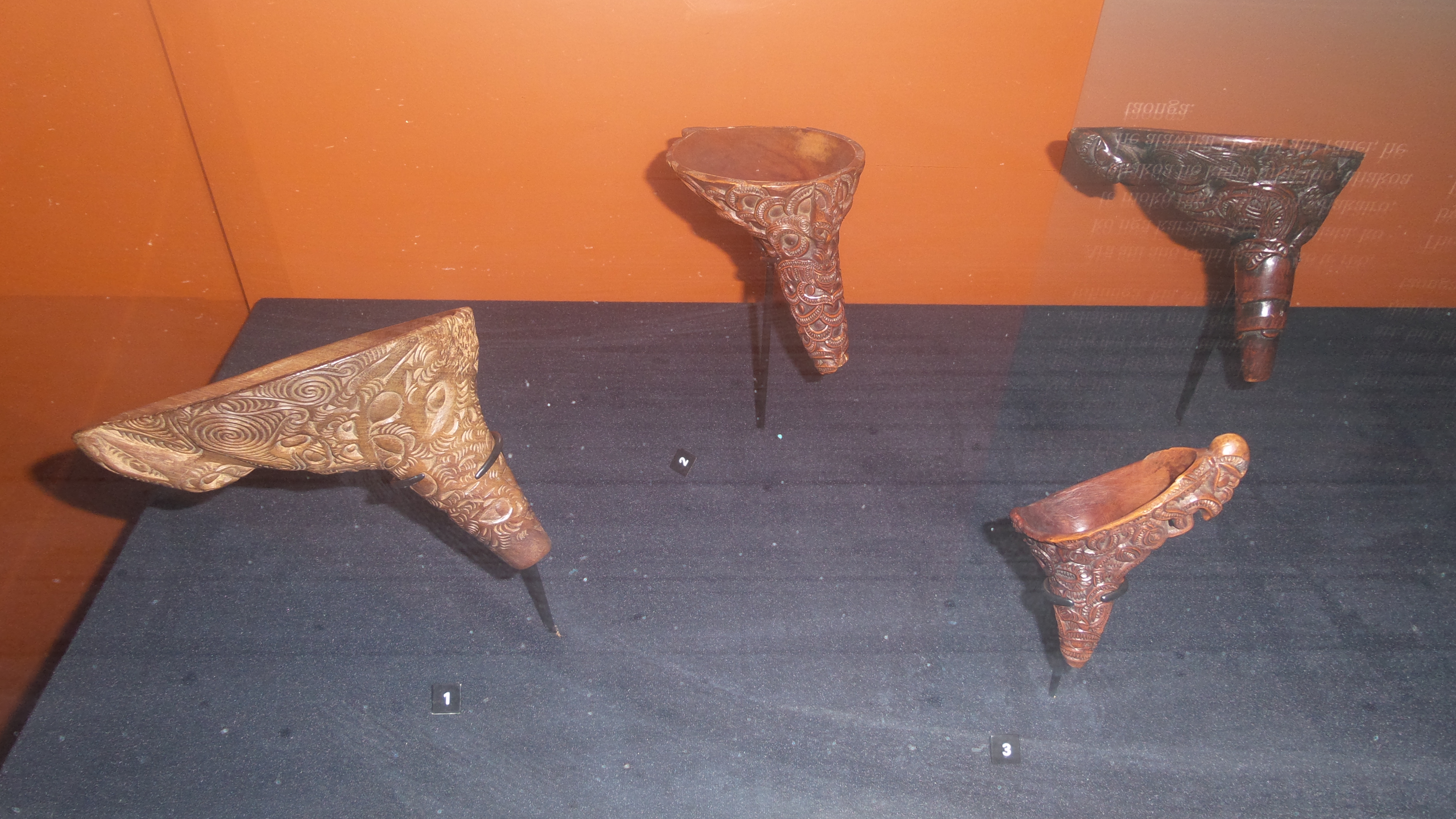
A collection of kōrere in Te Papa, Museum of New Zealand.

A kōrere is a traditional Māori feeding funnel that was used during facial tattooing to feed men of high status. Men receiving tā moko whose mouths were swollen would receive mulched or puréed food through the kōrere. It was also used to feed tohunga that were under tapu.
