= Tā moko =

Māori facial tattoo

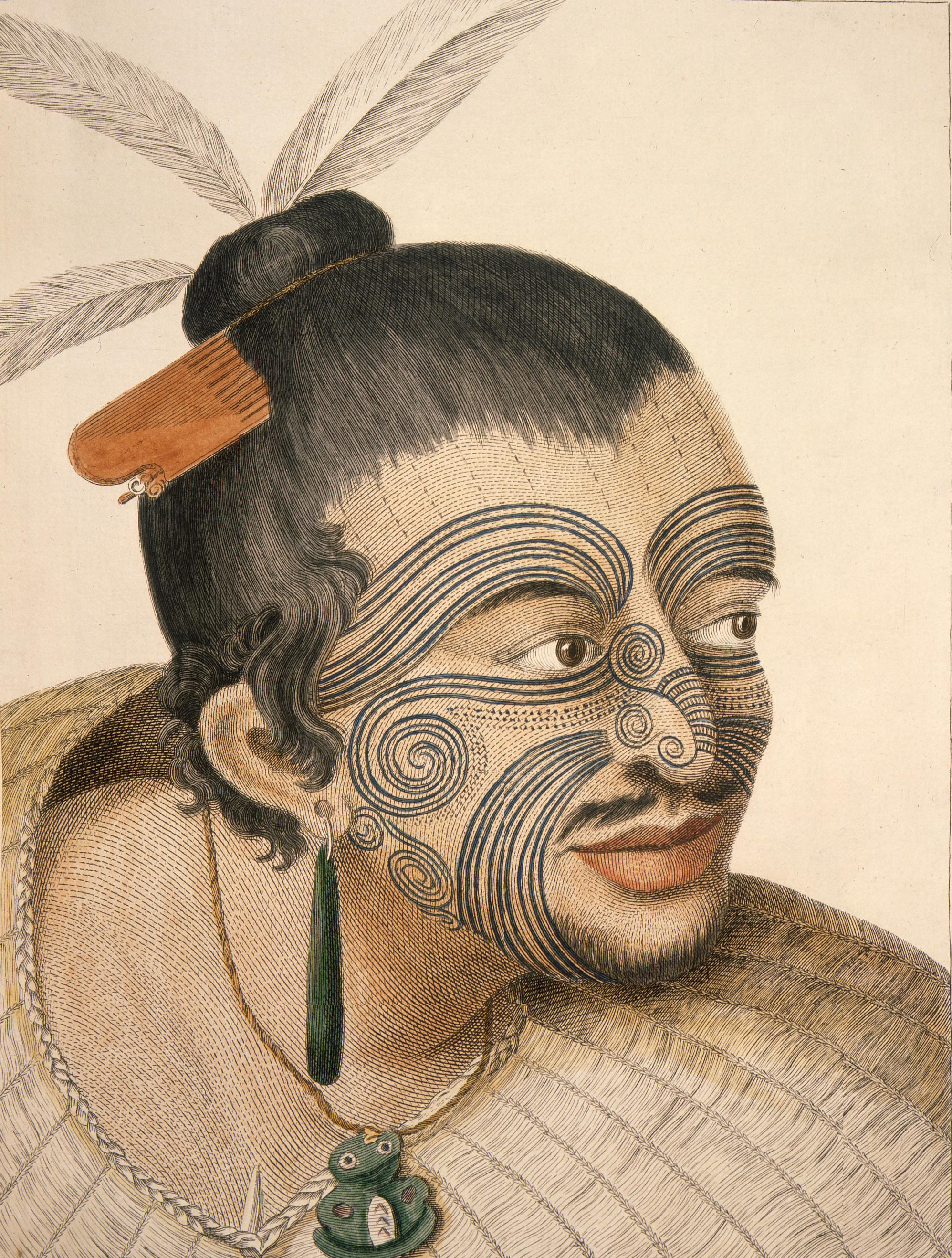
Sketch of a Māori chief, 1773 engraving by T. Chambers based on a 1769 drawing by Sydney Parkinson, from the 1784 edition of A Journal of a Voyage to the South Seas

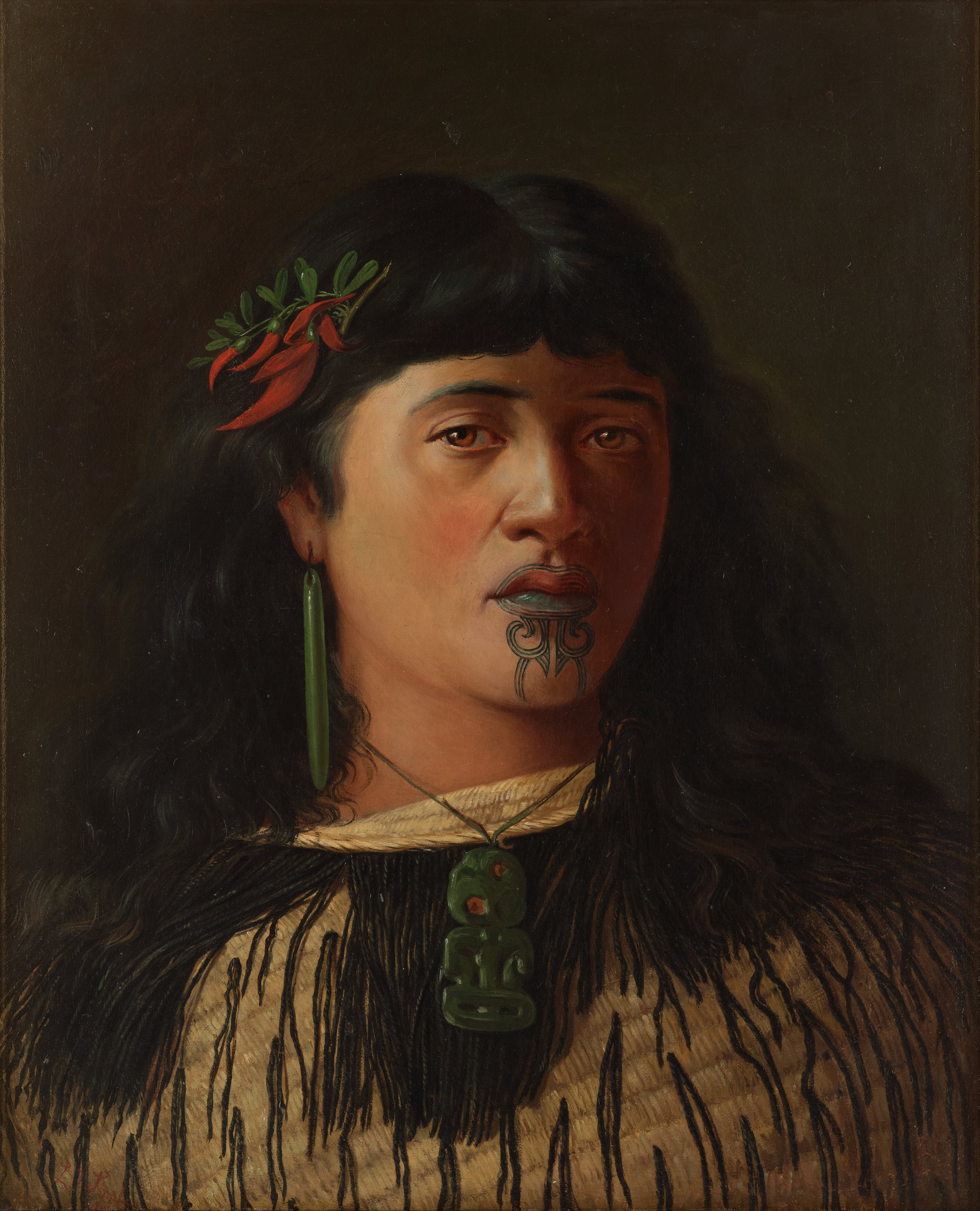
"Portrait of a young Maori woman with moko", by Louis John Steele (1891)

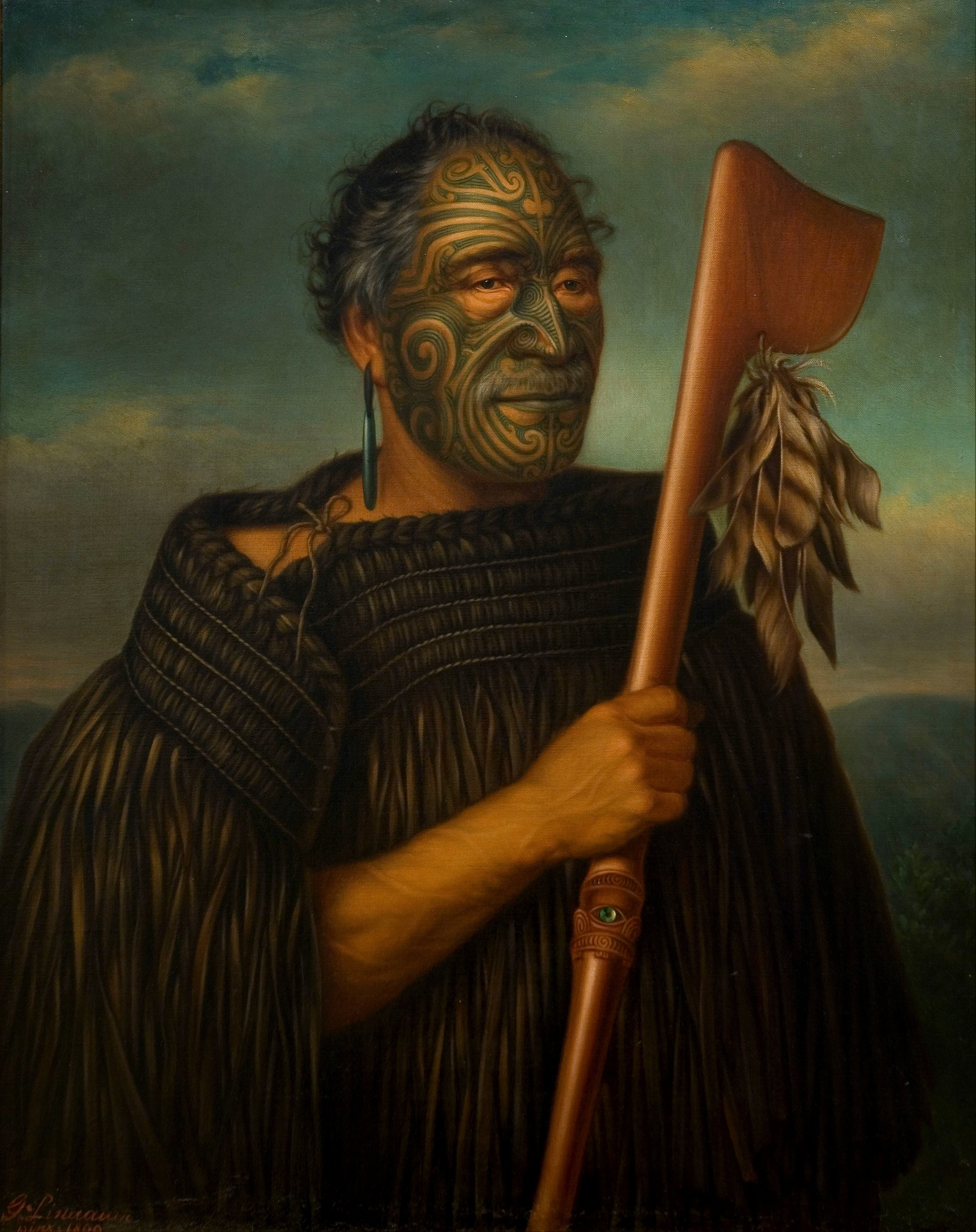
Portrait of Tāmati Wāka Nene by Gottfried Lindauer (1890)

Tā moko is the permanent marking or tattooing as customarily practised by Māori, the indigenous people of New Zealand. It is one of the five main Polynesian tattoo styles (the other four are Marquesan, Samoan, Tahitian and Hawaiian).

Tohunga-tā-moko (tattooists) were considered tapu, or inviolable and sacred.

== Historical practice (pre-contact) ==
Tattoo arts are common in the Eastern Polynesian homeland of the Māori people, and the traditional implements and methods employed were similar to those used in other parts of Polynesia. In pre-European Māori culture, many if not most high-ranking persons received moko. Moko were associated with mana and high social status; however, some very high-status individuals were considered too tapu to acquire moko, and it was also not considered suitable for some tohunga to do so.

Receiving moko constituted an important milestone between childhood and adulthood, and was accompanied by many rites and rituals. Apart from signalling status and rank, another reason for the practice in traditional times was to make a person more attractive to the opposite sex. Men generally received moko on their faces (moko kanohi), buttocks (raperape) and thighs (puhoro). Women usually wore moko on their lips (ngutu) and chins (kauae). Other parts of the body known to have moko include women's foreheads, buttocks, thighs, necks and backs and men's backs, stomachs, and calves.

=== Instruments used ===
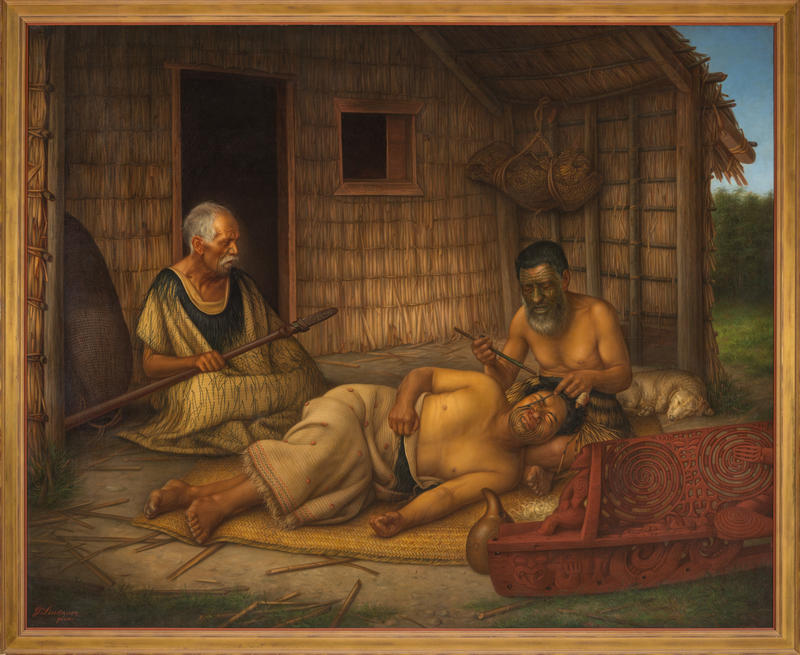
Painting by Gottfried Lindauer of a moko being carved into a man's face by a tohunga-tā-moko (tattooist)

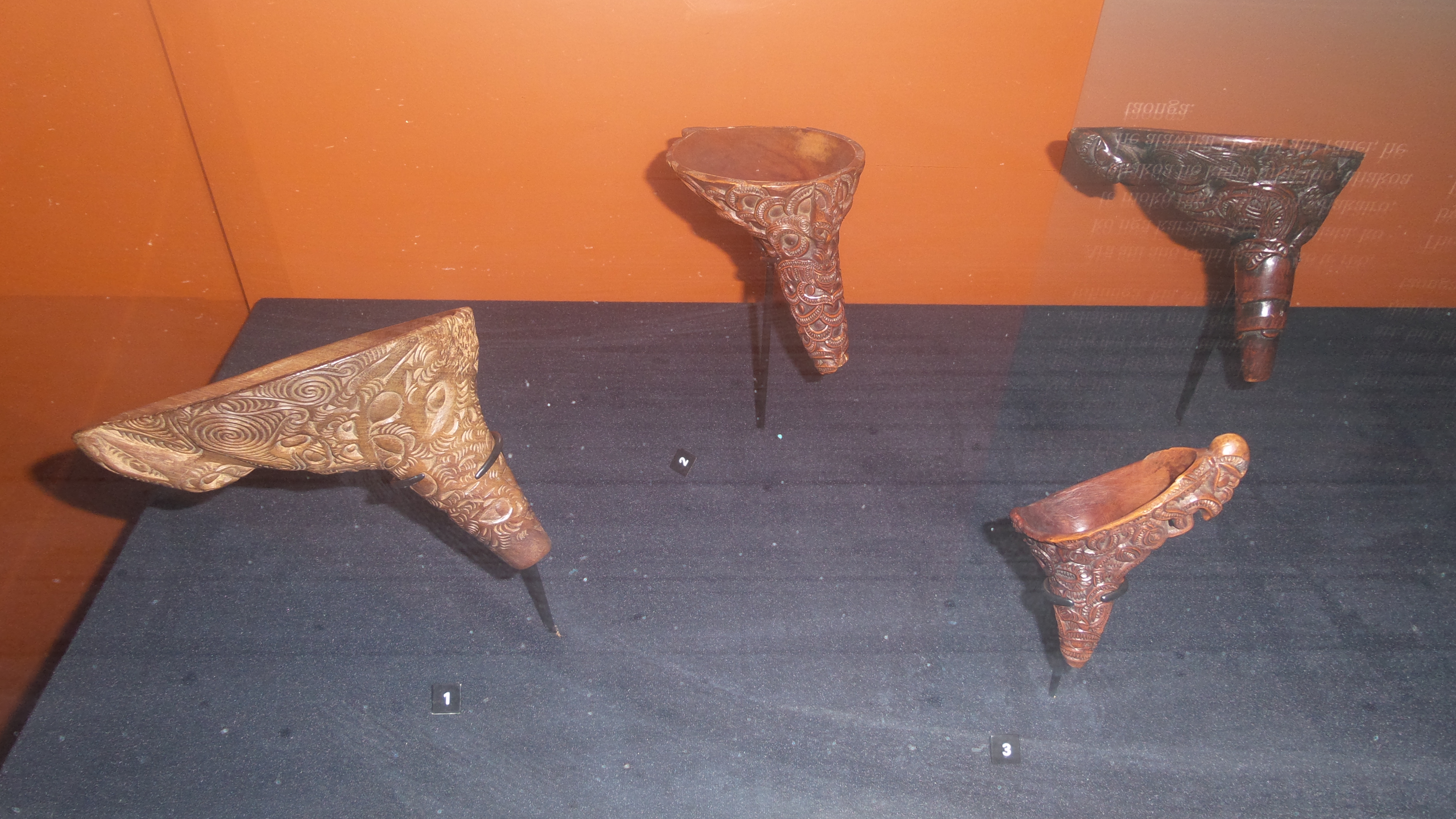
A collection of kōrere (feeding funnels)

Historically the skin was carved by uhi (chisels), rather than punctured as in common contemporary tattooing; this left the skin with grooves rather than a smooth surface. Later needle tattooing was used, but, in 2007, it was reported that the uhi was again being used by some artists.

Originally tohunga-tā-moko (moko specialists) used a range of uhi (chisels) made from albatross bone, which were hafted onto a handle, and struck with a mallet. The pigments were made from the āwheto for the body colour, and ngārehu (burnt timbers) for the blacker face colour. The soot from burnt kauri gum was also mixed with fat to make pigment. The pigment was stored in ornate vessels called oko, which were often buried when not in use. The oko were handed on to successive generations. A kōrere (feeding funnel) is believed to have been used to feed men whose mouths had become swollen from receiving tā moko.

Men and a few women were tā moko specialists and would travel to perform their art.

== Changes with European colonisation ==
The Pākehā practice of collecting and trading mokomokai (tattooed heads) changed the dynamic of tā moko in the early colonial period. King (see below) talks about changes that evolved in the late 19th century when needles came to replace the uhi as the main tools. The needle method was quicker and presented fewer health risks, but the texture of the moko was smooth. Tā moko on men stopped around the 1860s in line with changing fashion and acceptance by Pākehā.

Women continued receiving moko through the early 20th century, and the historian Michael King in the early 1970s interviewed over 70 elderly women who would have been given the moko before the 1907 Tohunga Suppression Act. Women's tattoos on lips and chin are commonly called pūkauae or moko kauae.

Men tended to remove facial hair to keep moko fully visible, while some chose to grow out their hair. Due to Christian missionaires having a dislike for moko, some men started covering their moko with facial hair. As a substitute for the declining tā moko in the 20th century, men increasingly wore facial hair.

== Contemporary practice ==
Since 1990 there has been a resurgence in the practice of tā moko for both men and women, as a sign of cultural identity and a reflection of the general revival of the language and culture. Most tā moko applied today is done using a tattoo machine, but there has also been a revival of the use of uhi (chisels). Women too have become more involved as practitioners, such as Christine Harvey in Christchurch, Henriata Nicholas in Rotorua and Julie Kipa in Whakatāne. It is not the first time the contact with settlers has interfered with the tools of the trade: the earliest moko were engraved with bone and were replaced by metal supplied by the first visitors.

The most significant change was the adjustment of the themes and conquests the tattoos represented. Tā moko artist Turumakina Duley, in an interview for Artonview magazine, shares his view on the transformation of the practice: "The difference in tā moko today as compared to the nineteenth century is in the change of lifestyle, in the way we live. [...] The tradition of moko was one of initiation, rites of passage – it started around that age – but it also benchmarks achievements in your life and gives you a goal to strive towards and achieve in your life." Duley received moko to celebrate his graduation from a bachelor in Māori studies.

A large proportion of New Zealanders now have tattoos of some sort, and there is "growing acceptance ... as a means of cultural and individual expression."

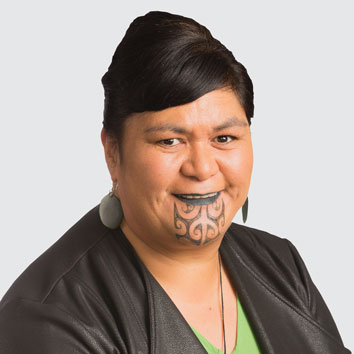
New Zealand foreign minister Nanaia Mahuta in 2020

In 2016 New Zealand politician Nanaia Mahuta received a moko kauae. When she became foreign minister in 2020, a writer said that her facial tattoo was inappropriate for a diplomat. There was much support for Mahuta, who said "there is an emerging awareness about the revitalisation of Māori culture and that facial moko is a positive aspect of that. We need to move away from moko being linked to gangs, because that is not what moko represent at all."

On 25 December 2021, Māori journalist Oriini Kaipara, who has a moko kauae, became the first person with traditional facial markings to host a prime-time news programme on national television in New Zealand.

In 2022, Ariana Tikao published a book called Mokorua: Ngā kōrero mō tōku moko kauae: My story of moko kauae detailing her tā moko journey; her artist was Christine Harvey.

Alien Weaponry bassist Tūranga Edmonds got his moko kanohi at the age of 25.

=== Use by non-Māori ===
Europeans were aware of tā moko from the time of the first voyage of James Cook. Early Māori visitors to Europe, such as Moehanga in 1805, Hongi Hika in 1820 and Te Pēhi Kupe in 1826, all had full-face moko, as did several Pākehā Māori, such as Barnet Burns. However, until relatively recently the art had little global impact.

Wearing of moko by non-Māori has been called cultural appropriation, and high-profile uses of Māori designs by Robbie Williams, Ben Harper and a 2007 Jean Paul Gaultier fashion show were controversial.

To reconcile the demand for Māori designs in a culturally sensitive way, the Te Uhi a Mataora group promotes the use of the term kirituhi, which has now gained wide acceptance:

...Kirituhi translates literally to mean—"skin writing." As opposed to moko which requires a process of consents, genealogy and historical information, kirituhi is merely a design with Māori flavour that can be applied anywhere, for any reason and on anyone...

== Gallery ==
Moko

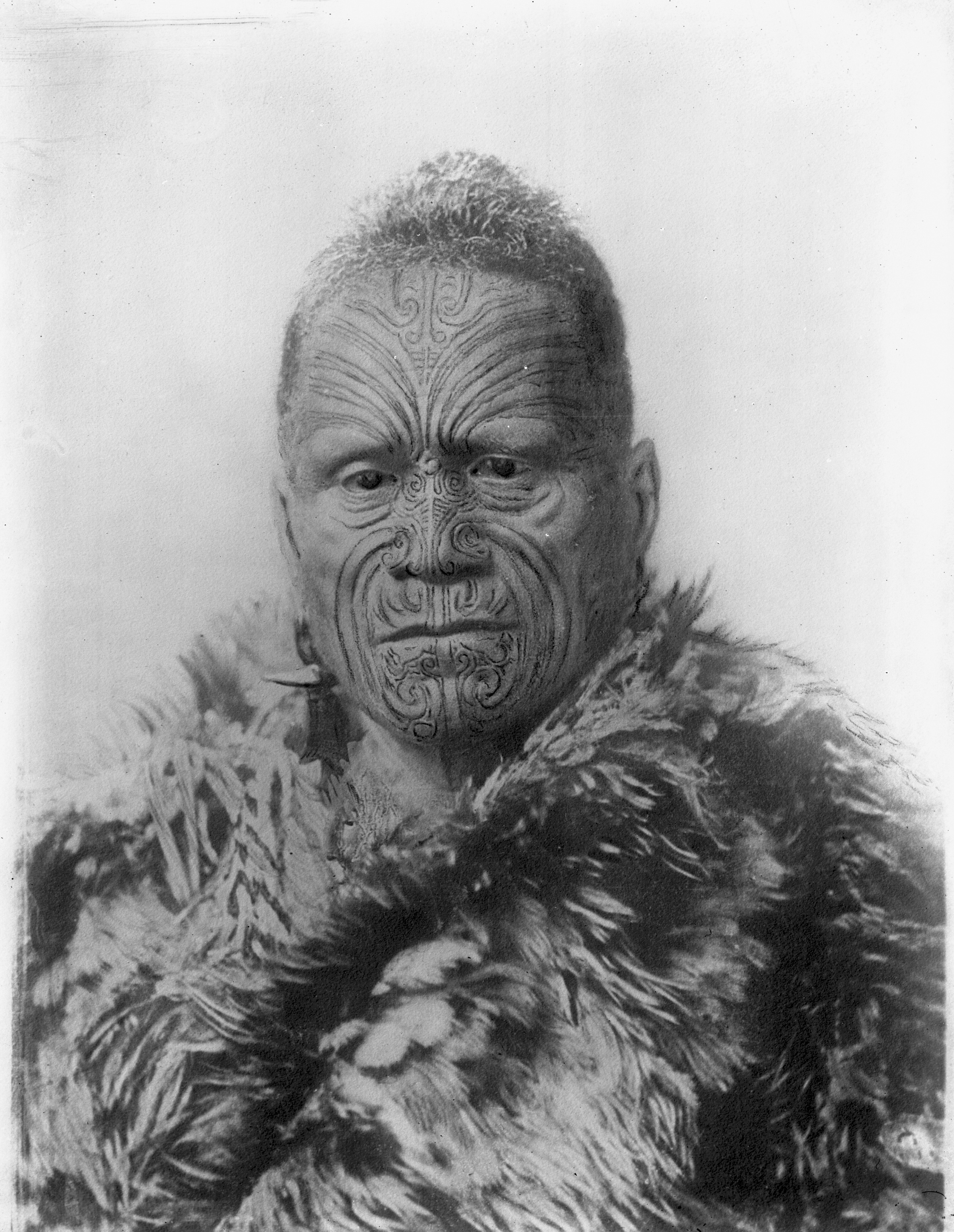
Tāwhiao, Tukaroto Matutaera Potatau Te Wherowhero

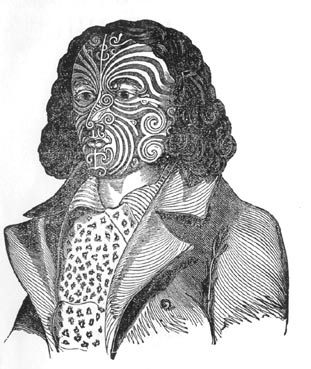
Barnet Burns, a Pākehā Māori

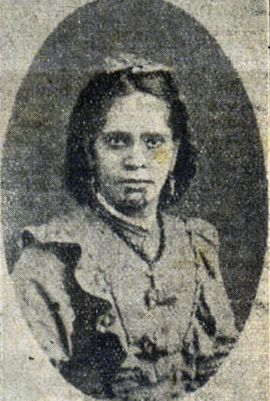
Riperata Kahutia (Te Aitanga-a-Mahaki)

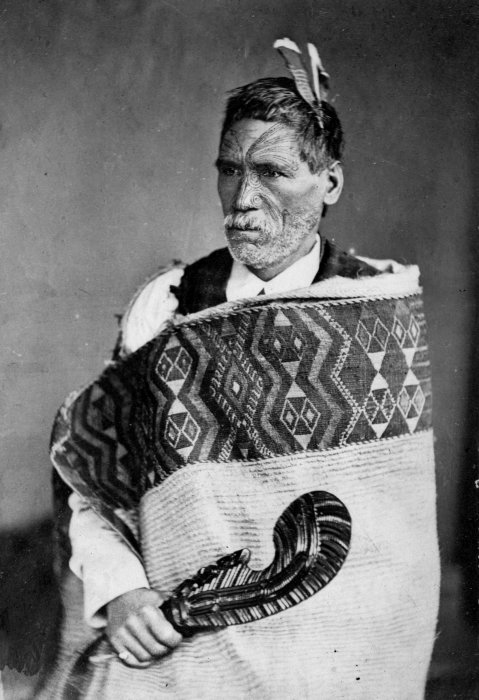
Rewi Maniapoto (Ngāti Maniapoto)

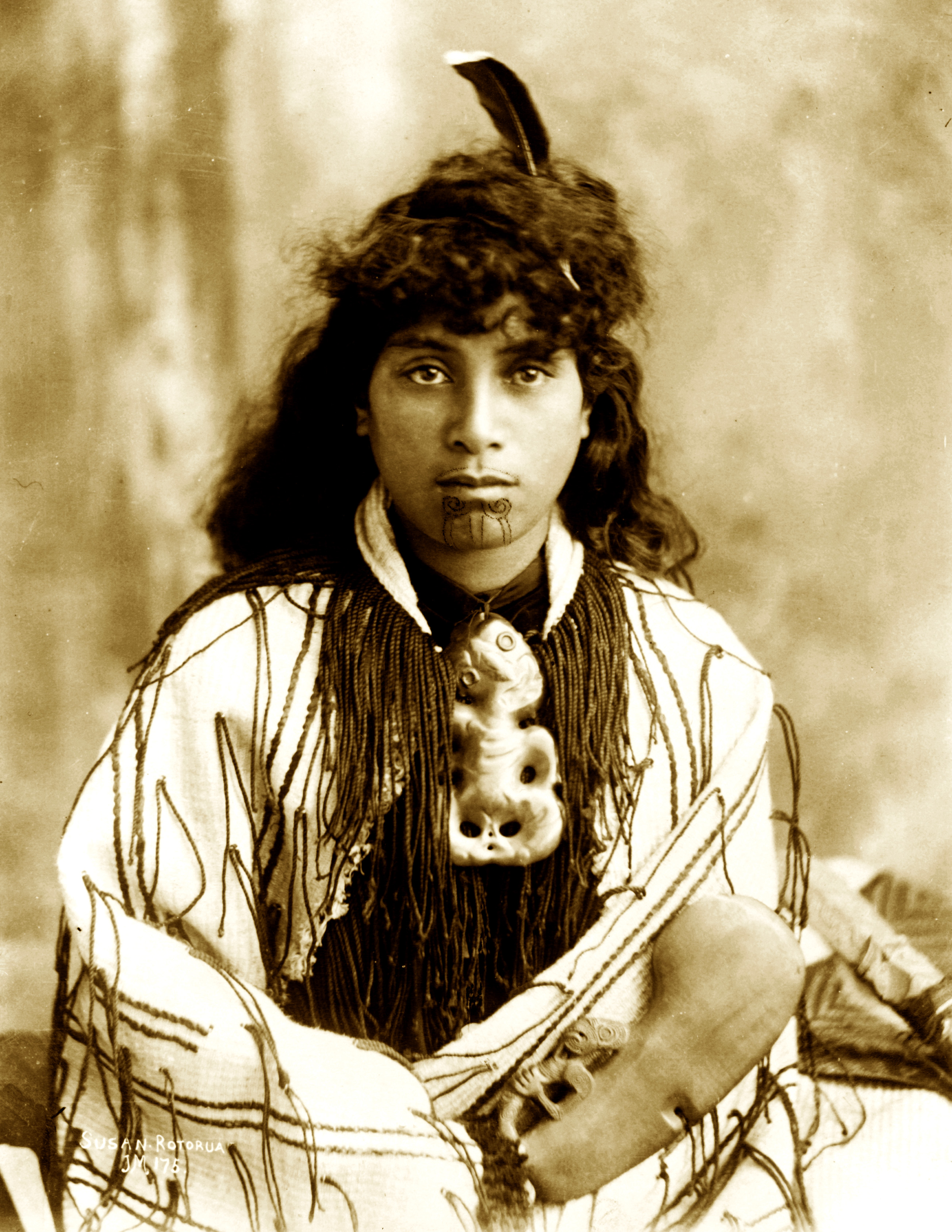
Guide Susan

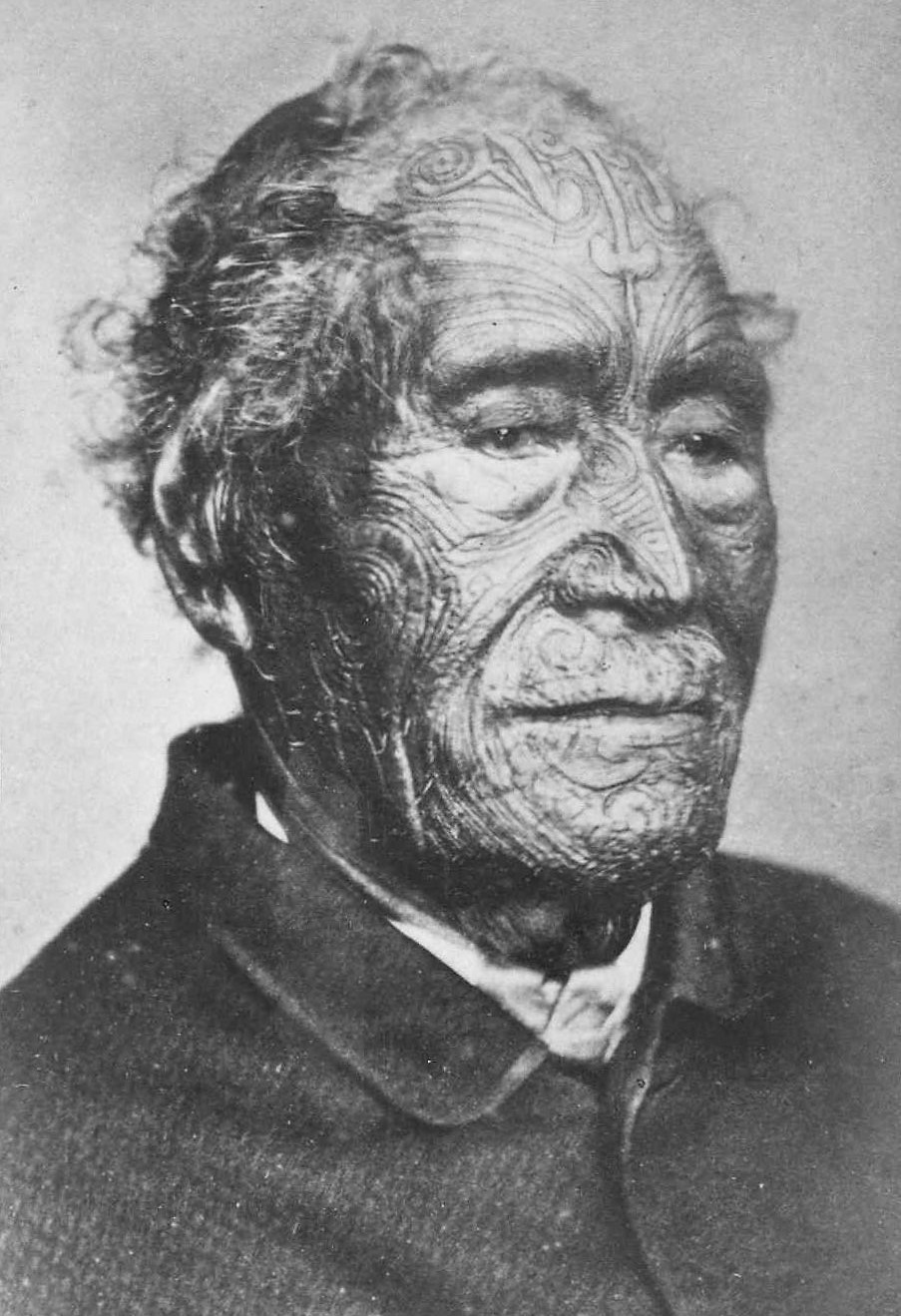
Tāmati Wāka Nene (Ngāpuhi)

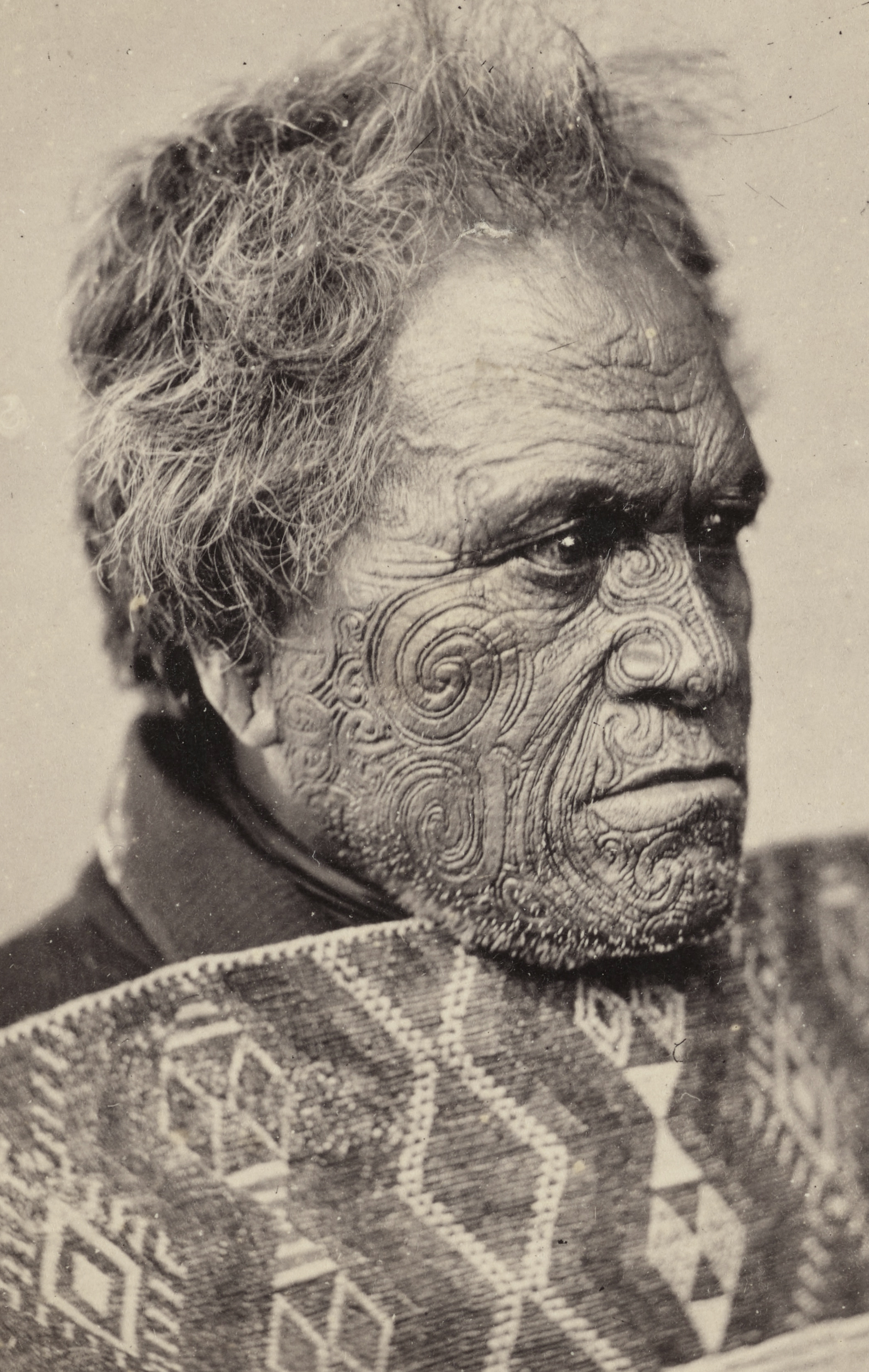
Tomika Te Mutu, (Ngāi Te Rangi)

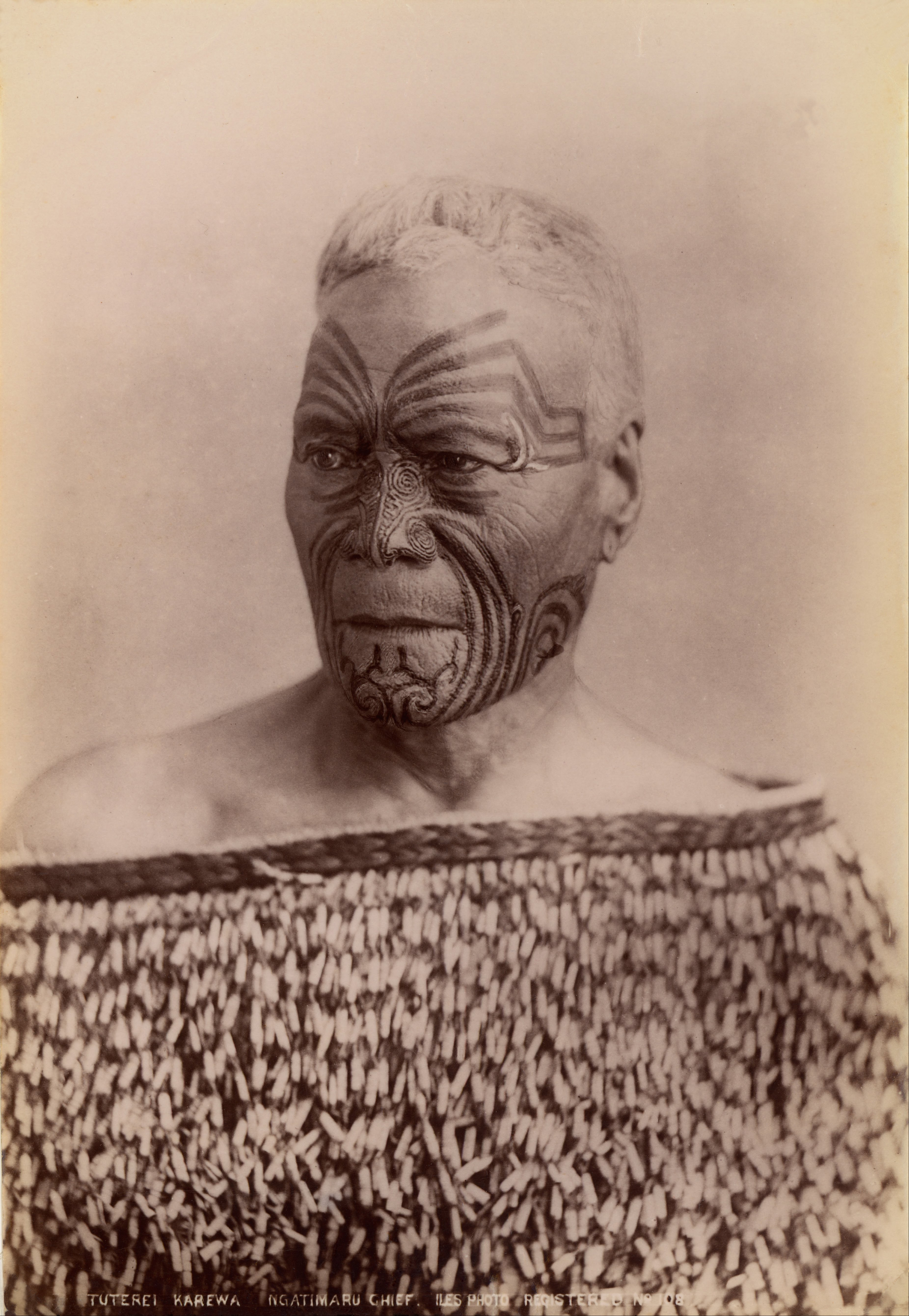
Tuterei Karewa, (Ngāti Maru (Hauraki))

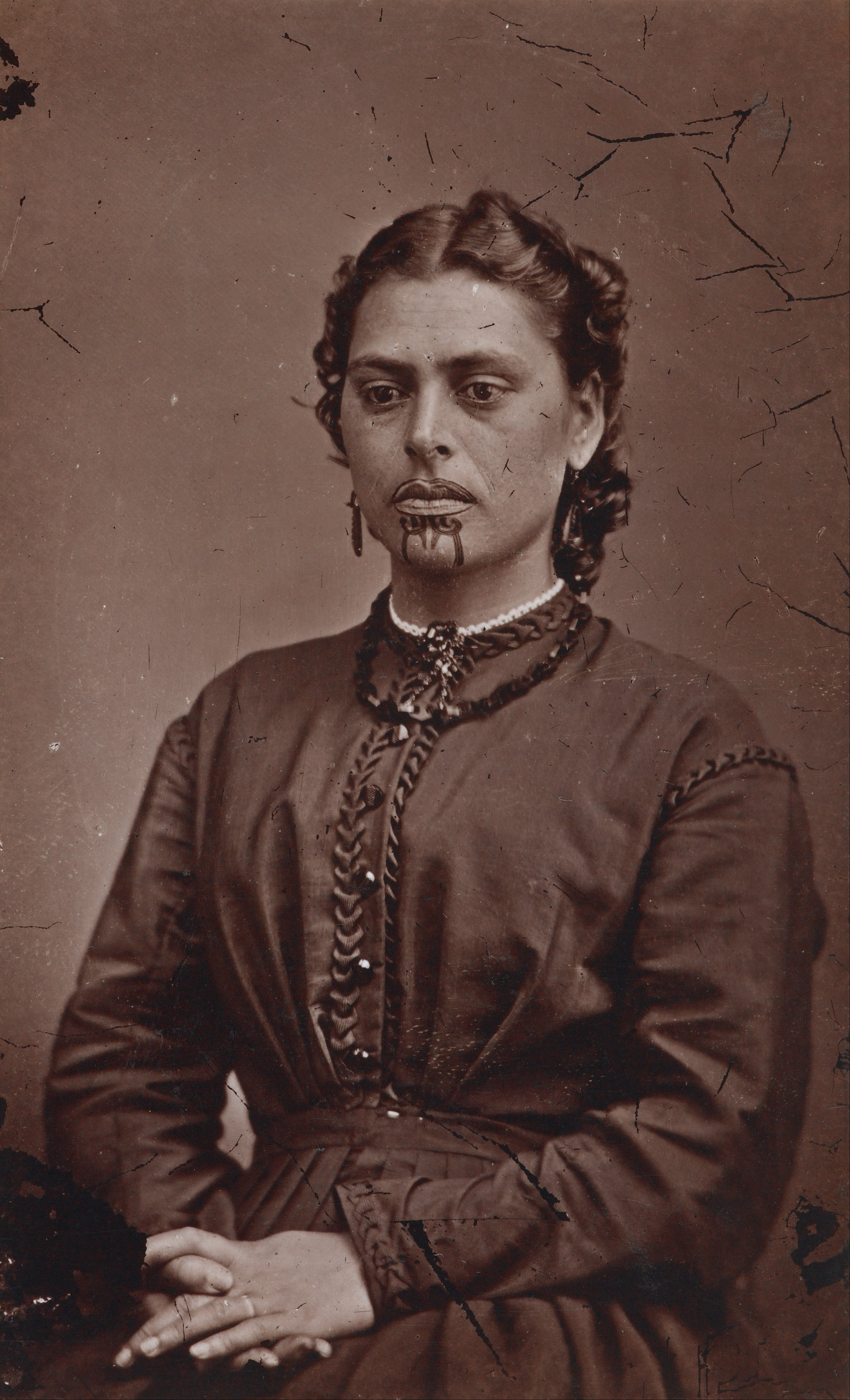
Mrs. Rabone, 1871

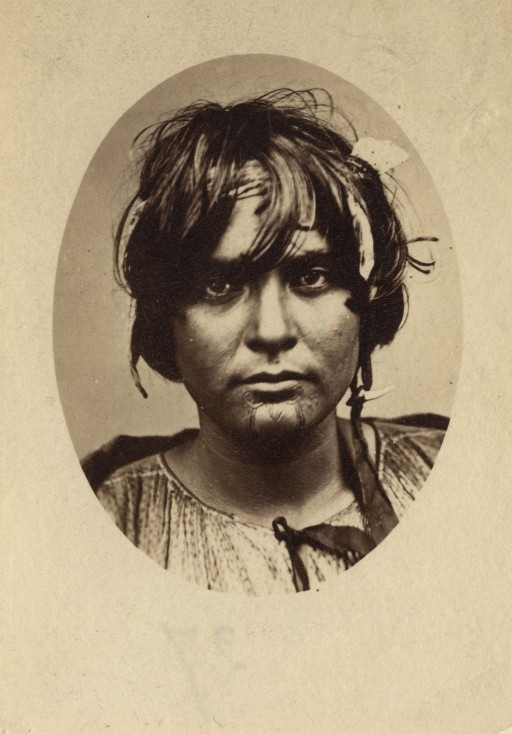
Hariota Hull

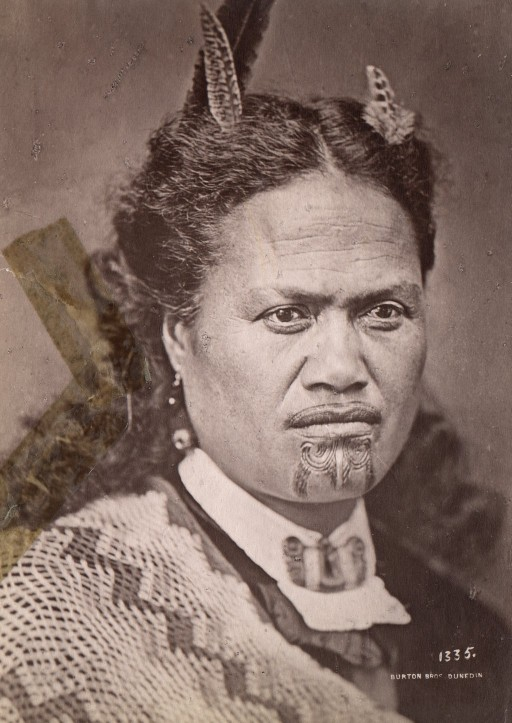

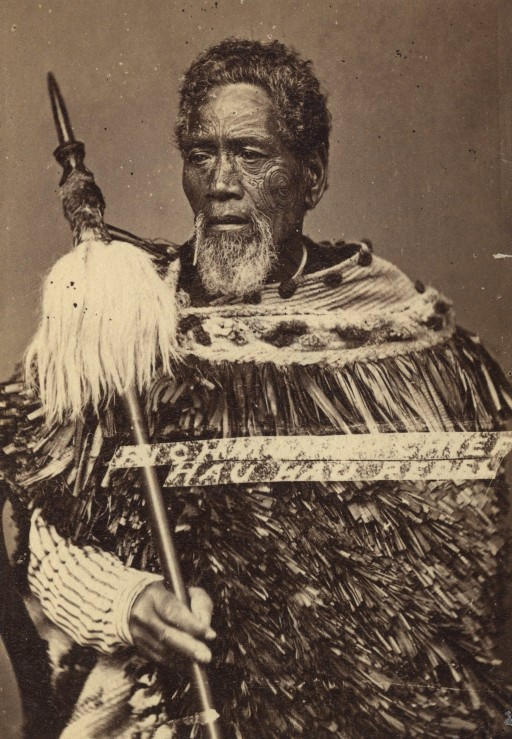

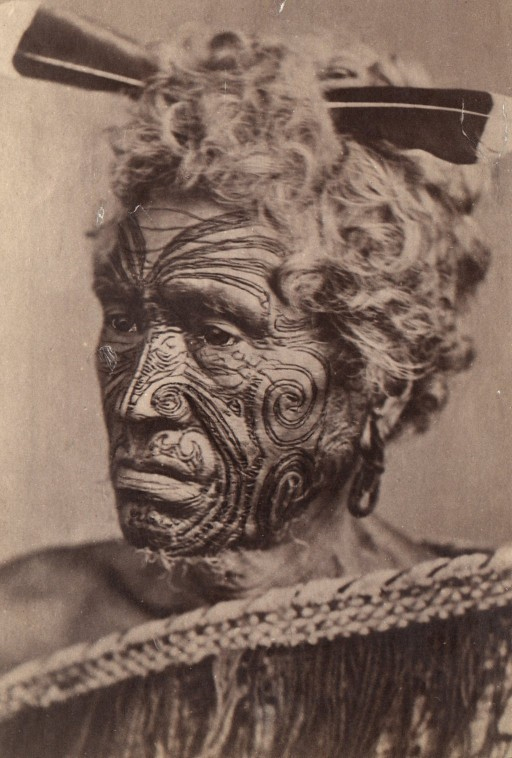

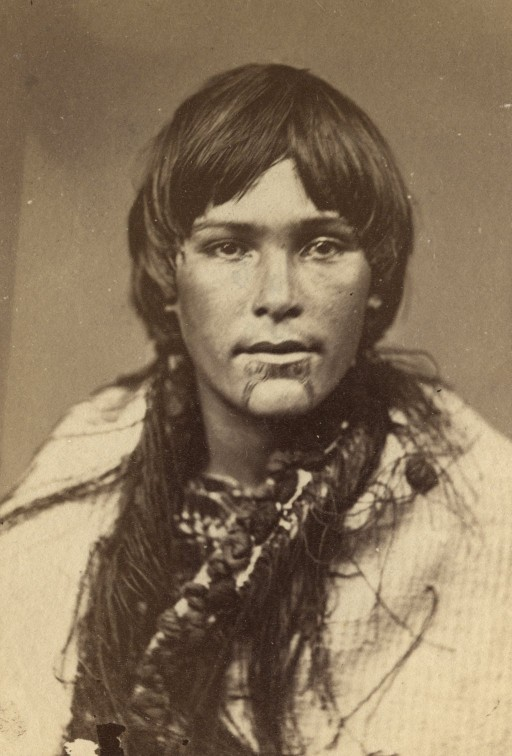

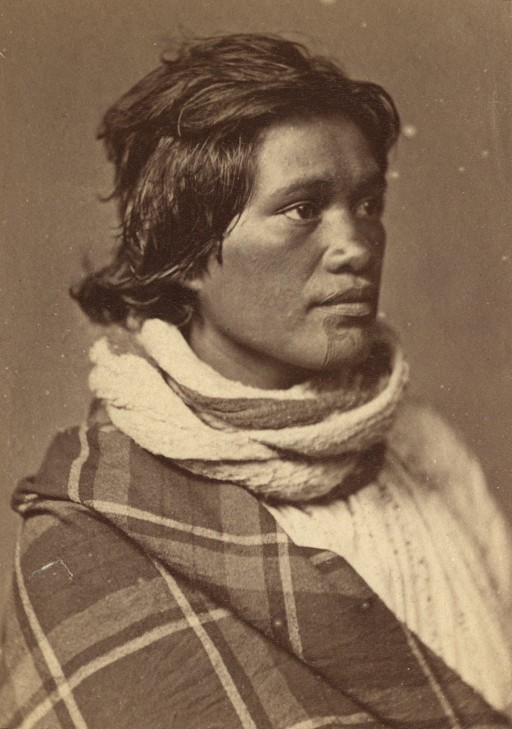

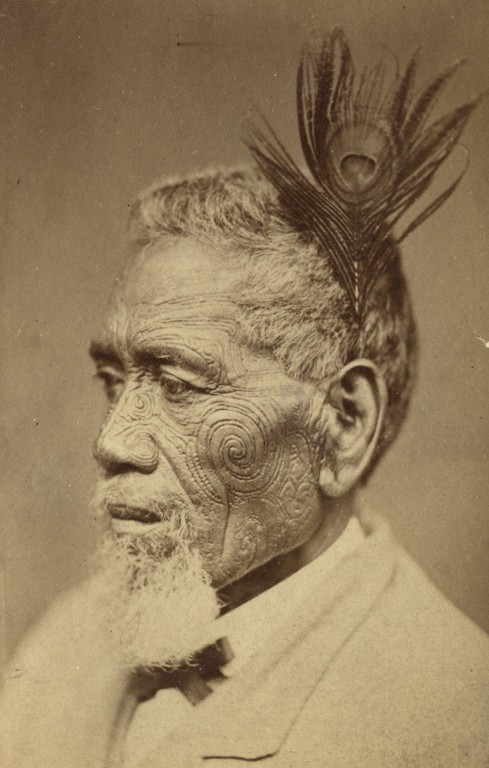

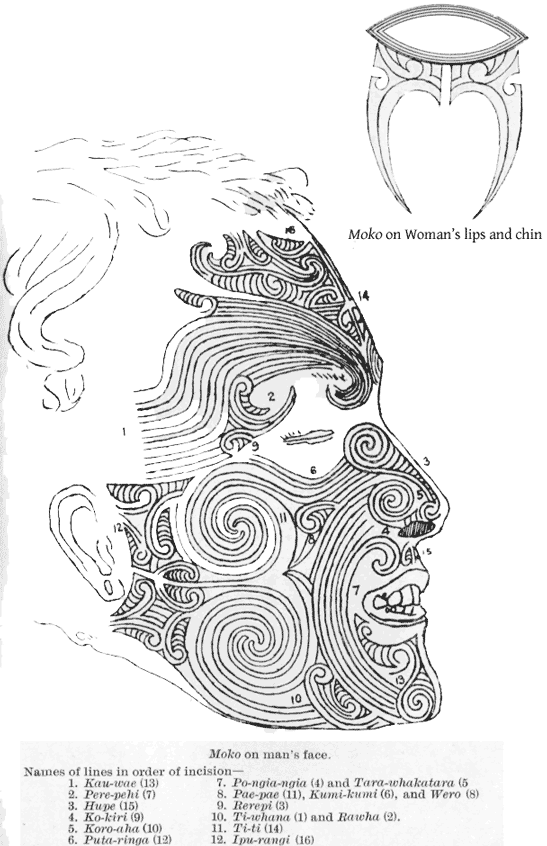
Māori moko from a 1908 publication

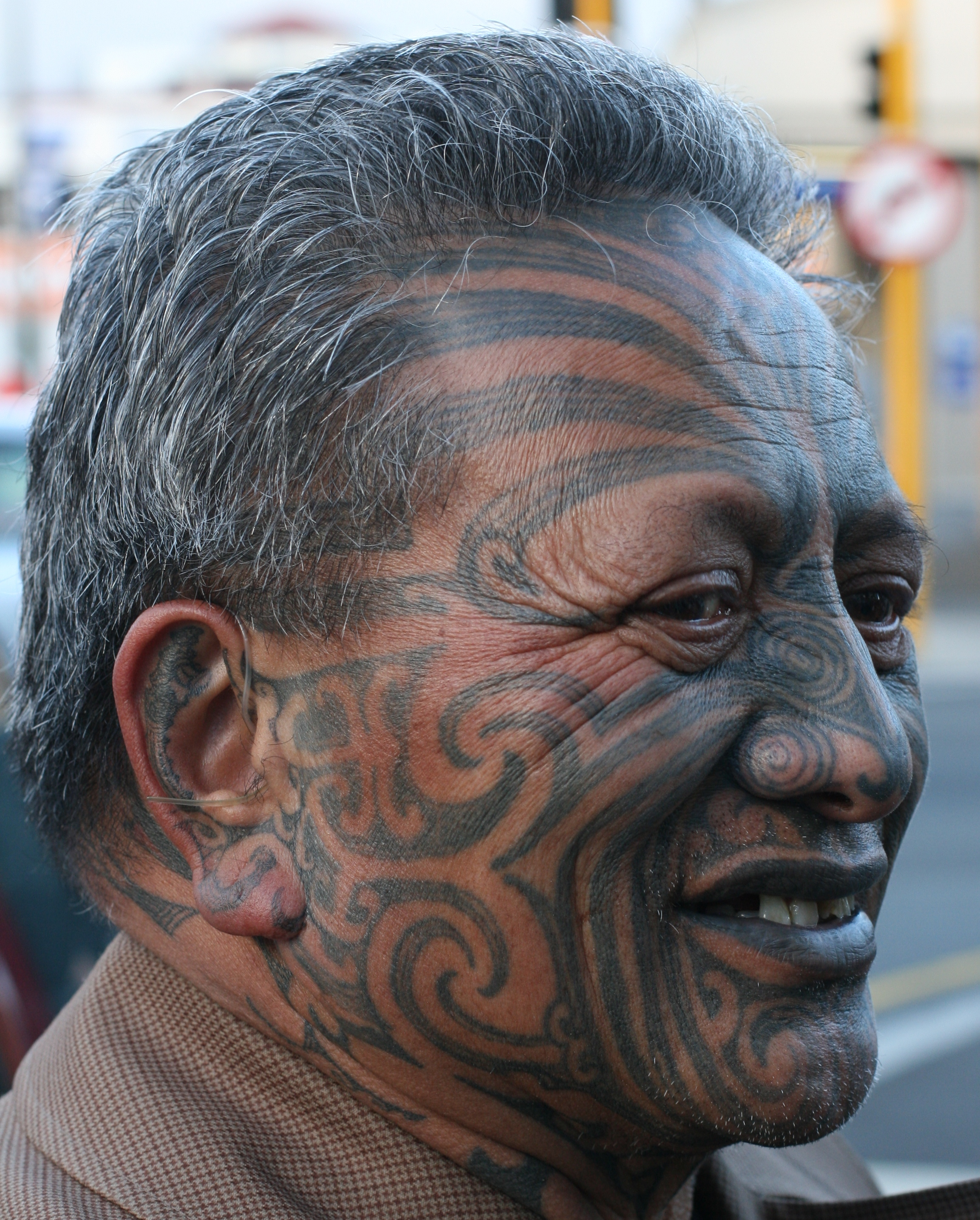
Tūhoe activist
Tame Iti

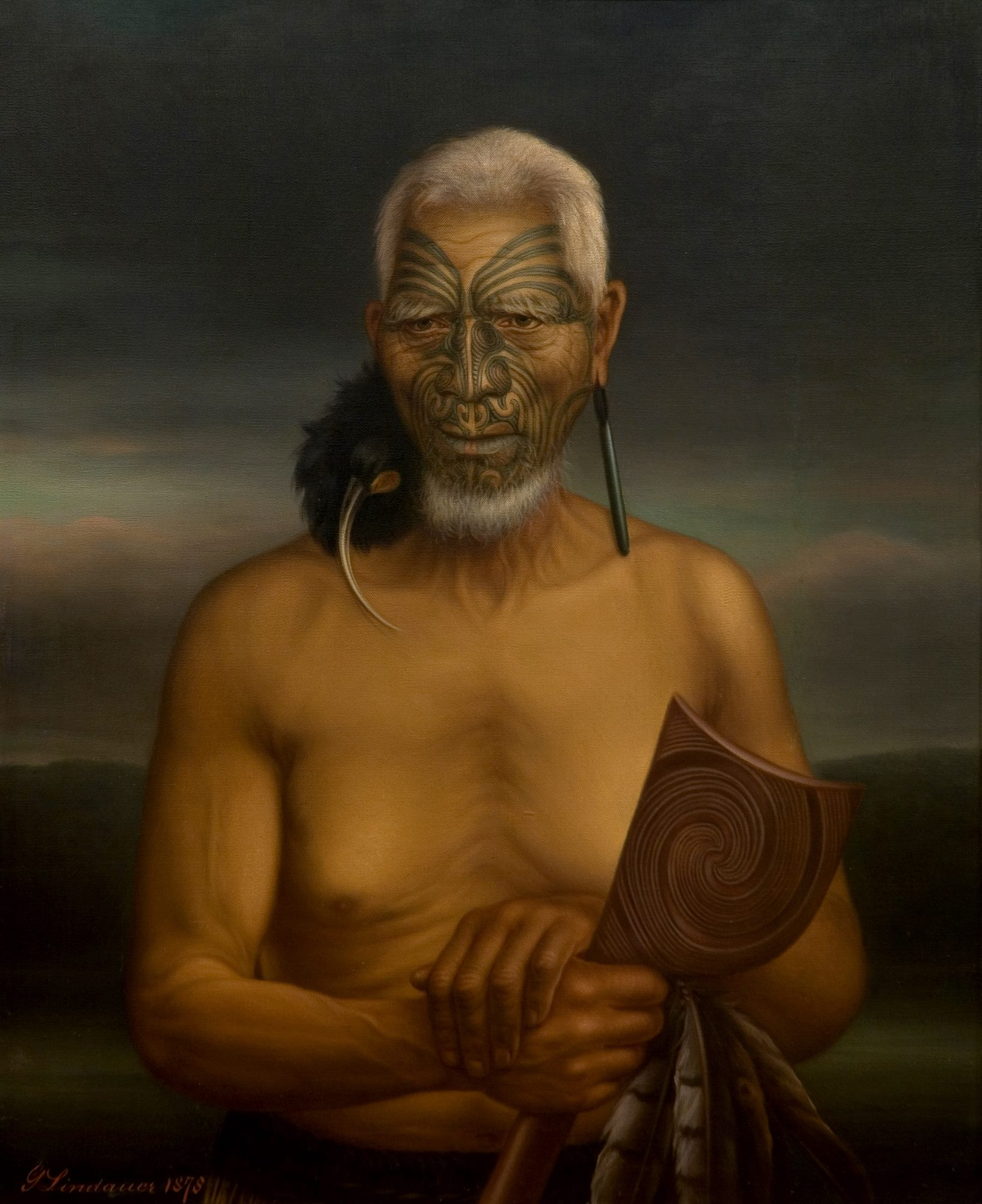
Tukukino Te Ahiātaewa
(Ngāti Tamaterā)

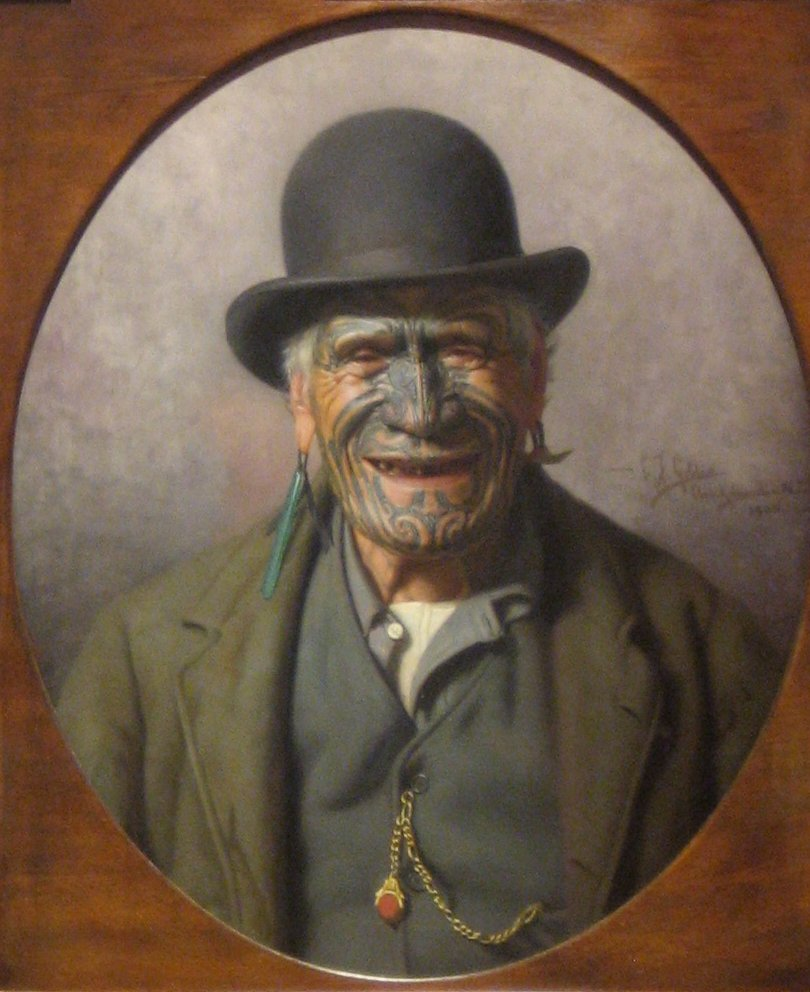
Te Aho-o-te-rangi Wharepu
(Ngāti Mahuta)

== See also ==
- Mokomokai, preserved Māori heads
- Pe'a, traditional male Samoan tattoo
