= Bill Gallagher (businessman) =

New Zealand businessman (born 1941)

Sir William Gallagher KNZM MBE
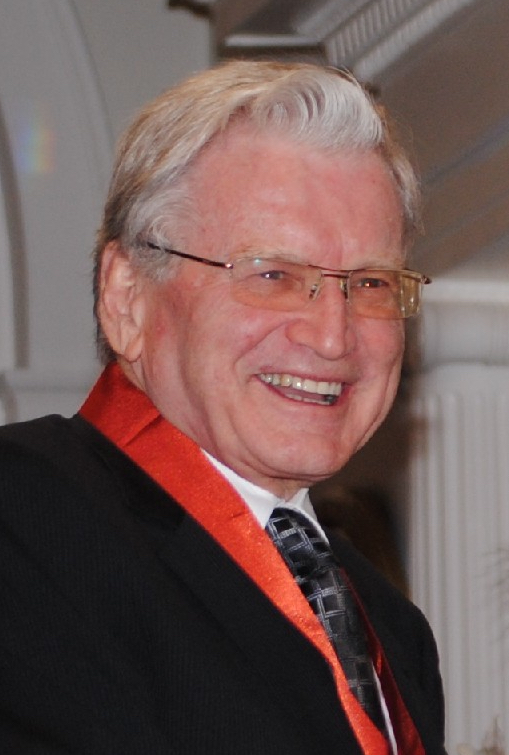
- Gallagher in 2011
- Born: William Murray Gallagher; 22 January 1941 (age 85)
- Occupation: Businessman
- Relatives: Bill Gallagher (father); John Gallagher (brother)

Sir William Murray Gallagher KNZM MBE (born 22 January 1941) is a New Zealand businessman.

== Biography ==
Gallagher was born on 22 January 1941, the son of Bill Gallagher and Millie Gallagher (née Murray).

The younger Bill Gallagher and his brother John took increasing roles in the business and marketing side of the family firm through the 1960s, with Bill leading the company's export push into Australia and becoming the chief executive and chairman in 1973. By 2010, the Gallagher Group was exporting to over 130 countries with revenue of $160 million, and had over 1000 employees, including 600 in New Zealand. Their product range had expanded to include high-powered electric fences, automatic gate openers, security access systems, and animal weighing devices.

Gallagher and his wife, Judi, have three children.

== Hamilton statue controversy ==
In 2013, the Gallagher Group donated to Hamilton City a statue of John Fane Charles Hamilton, a British naval officer who was killed at the Battle of Gate Pā, for whom the city was named. In 2017, Gallagher gave a speech in which he called the Treaty of Waitangi a "fraud", and said that non-Māori risked being stripped of their rights and becoming unable to visit New Zealand's beaches. In 2018, the statue of Hamilton was defaced with red paint, and it was removed from public display in Civic Square by the Hamilton City Council in 2020 following a request from the local iwi, Waikato Tainui. Gallagher subsequently circulated reports to city councillors detailing an alternative history of New Zealand in which Māori were not the first inhabitants of New Zealand, a theory that has been debunked by leading historians.

== Philanthropy ==
The Sir William and Lady Judi Gallagher Foundation provides scholarships for computing and mathematical science, engineering, management and music (specifically opera).

== Honours and awards ==
In the 1987 Queen's Birthday Honours, Gallagher was appointed a Member of the Order of the British Empire, for services to export. In 1990, he was awarded the New Zealand 1990 Commemoration Medal. Gallagher was appointed a Companion of the New Zealand Order of Merit, for services to business and export, in the 1999 New Year Honours, and promoted to Knight Companion of the New Zealand Order of Merit in the 2011 New Year Honours, for services to business.

In 2004, Gallagher was inducted into the New Zealand Business Hall of Fame, and in 2008 he was awarded an honorary doctorate by the University of Waikato. In 2025, Gallagher was made a life member of National Fieldays, recognising his contributions to the event itself as well as to the New Zealand agritech industry in general.
