= George Floyd protests in New Zealand =

2020 anti-racism protests in New Zealand

- Part of George Floyd protests
- Date: 1 June 2020 – 14 June 2020
- Location: New Zealand
- Caused by: Police brutality; Institutional racism against Māori; Reaction to the murder of George Floyd; Solidarity with concurrent protests in the United States

Cities in New Zealand in which a protest with about 100 or more participants was held

Shortly after protests seeking justice for George Floyd, an African-American who was murdered during a police arrest, began in the United States, people in New Zealand protested to show support for similar protests in the United States and to demonstrate against perceived issues with police brutality and structural discrimination in New Zealand. Vigils and protests of thousands of participants took place in June 2020 throughout the nation.

== Background ==
The George Floyd protests sparked a strong response among New Zealanders, in particular among the indigenous Māori people who activists say face structural discrimination similarly to African Americans in the United States. In the aftermath of the Christchurch mosque shootings, the police conducted a trial of equipping normally unarmed police officers with firearms. The trial ended in April 2020 without incidents of officers discharging their weapon.

== Reactions ==
Several prominent Māori and other Polynesian figures including Taika Waititi and Parris Goebel expressed solidarity with George Floyd.

=== Political ===
Prime Minister of New Zealand Jacinda Ardern has stated that she was "horrified" by the situation around the murder of George Floyd. Ardern had been criticised by local Black Lives Matter solidarity protesters for remaining silent about Floyd's murder for a week. Green Party of Aotearoa New Zealand politicians James Shaw and Marama Davidson both stated they believed US President Donald Trump was racist when asked by press gallery journalist about his inflammatory tweets. Todd Muller declined to answer the question.

In a letter, Davidson requested that police commissioner Andrew Coster end the testing of armed officers. She also called for Coster to acknowledge New Zealand's challenges with racism and discrimination. On 9 June, Coster announced that the New Zealand Police would be scrapping their armed response teams after public feedback and consultation with community forum groups. However, just a day after Coster announced the Armed Response Teams would be axed, he floated the idea of arming the police with sponge bullets instead. Emilie Rākete, a spokesperson for the Arms Down campaign, responded by saying that sponge bullets are extremely dangerous, and will be used against Māori more than any other group if they are rolled out.

On 1 June, Deputy Prime Minister Winston Peters criticised protesters in Auckland for violating the New Zealand Government's COVID-19 regulations regarding limited social gatherings.

Green MP Golriz Ghahraman stated, "The disease of state-based discrimination is not constrained to American borders. We must acknowledge that here in New Zealand, at every single step of the justice system, Māori face increased discrimination. This means that Māori experience more arrests, more prosecutions, longer jail sentences, more brutality, and deaths, than Pākehā in similar circumstances."

=== Civil society ===
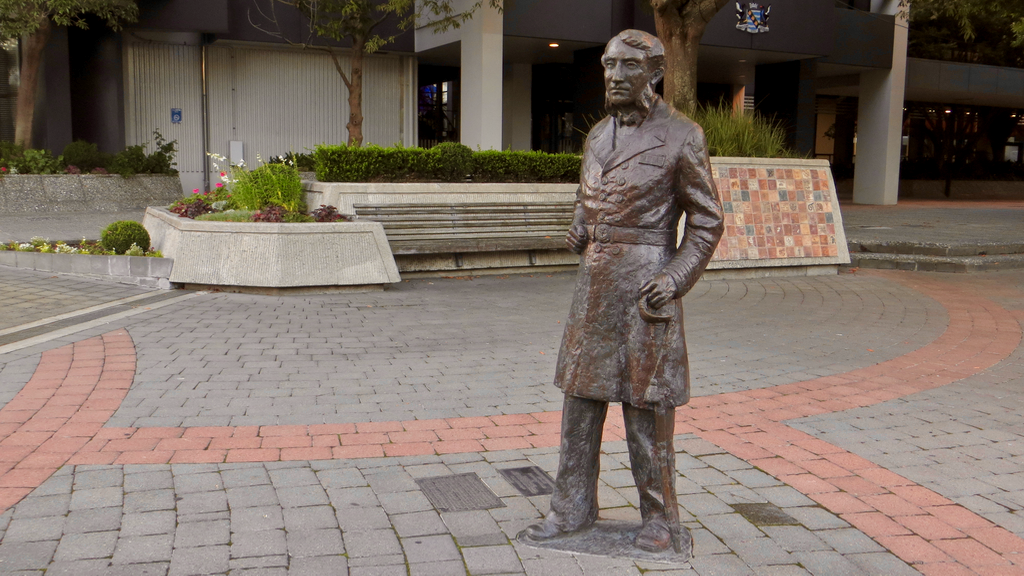
The removal of Captain Hamilton's statue drew considerable media attention.

On 9 June 2020, the Akaroa–based bar and restaurant "Bully Hayes Restaurant" announced that it would be changing its name after several historians including Scott Hamilton criticised its namesake William "Bully" Hayes' involvement in blackbirding in the Pacific during the late 19th century.

On 10 June, Marist College in Auckland attracted publicity after teachers reportedly tore down Black Lives Matter posters. Students organised a nine minutes silence for George Floyd and started an online petition to highlight racial issues at the college, alleging that several teachers had been racist towards students. In response, Prime Minister Ardern voiced support for the students' activism. In addition, a formal complaint was lodged against Marist College. On 16 June, 30 students staged a peaceful protest against alleged "systematic racism" at the college.

On 12 June, the North Island city of Hamilton removed a statue of British Captain John Fane Charles Hamilton at the request of local Māori iwi Waikato Tainui. Captain Hamilton was controversial among Māori for his role at the Battle of Gate Pā during the New Zealand Wars. The statue's removal has been linked to calls for the removal of statues of figures associated with colonialism and racism in New Zealand and the world, which had been precipitated by the murder of George Floyd. In response, the Māori Party's co-leader and Te Tai Hauāuru candidate Debbie Ngarewa-Packer called on the Government to establish an inquiry to identify and remove what she regarded as racist monuments, statues and names associated with New Zealand's colonial era. The Marlborough District's Deputy Mayor Nadine Taylor has also called for the renaming of Picton due to his controversial governorship of Trinidad. Calls to remove statues were opposed by Deputy Prime Minister Winston Peters and National Party Member of Parliament Simeon Brown, who described them as a "wave of wokeism" and "erasing history."

On 13 June, a statue of Captain James Cook in the North Island town of Gisborne was vandalised with graffiti promoting Black and Māori rights and swastikas. On 15 June, the leasehold upstairs venue to Dunedin's Captain Cook Hotel announced that it would be changing its name in response to both Captain James Cook's controversial legacy among Māori and the Black Lives Matter protests sparked by George Floyd's murder. The building and downstairs restaurant will keep its name.

In addition, statues of Queen Victoria and Scottish poet Robert Burns were targeted by protesters in Dunedin in mid-June due to the former's association with British colonialism and the latter's alleged complicity in slavery. On 18 June, it was reported that the Rangitikei District Council had covered up a statue of Captain Cook in Marton pending a decision about its future in response to the public debate around colonial era statues, monuments, and place names.

Calls to remove monuments to controversial colonial figures also triggered a call by LifeNet charity director Brendan Malone to remove a monument to Māori chief and Ngāti Toa military leader Te Rauparaha in Ōtaki since had enslaved, tortured, and eaten members of rival Māori tribes. In response, Victoria University of Wellington historian Dr Arini Loader and former Labour Party candidate Shane Te Pou disputed Malone's attempts to draw a moral equivalence with colonial figures such as Captain John Fane Charles Hamilton, arguing that Te Rauparaha had supported a local church and that other iwi including Rauparaha's former victims recognised his historical importance.

=== Organisations ===
Arms Down NZ stated that they saw a parallel in the plight of African Americans and the indigenous communities in New Zealand in regards to police brutality and racism.

== Demonstrations ==
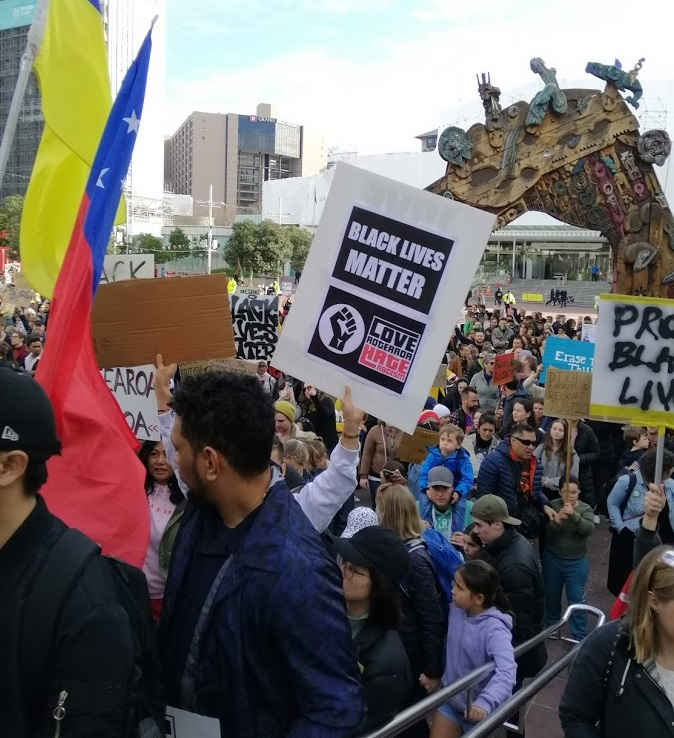
June 14 Black Lives Matter protest in Auckland

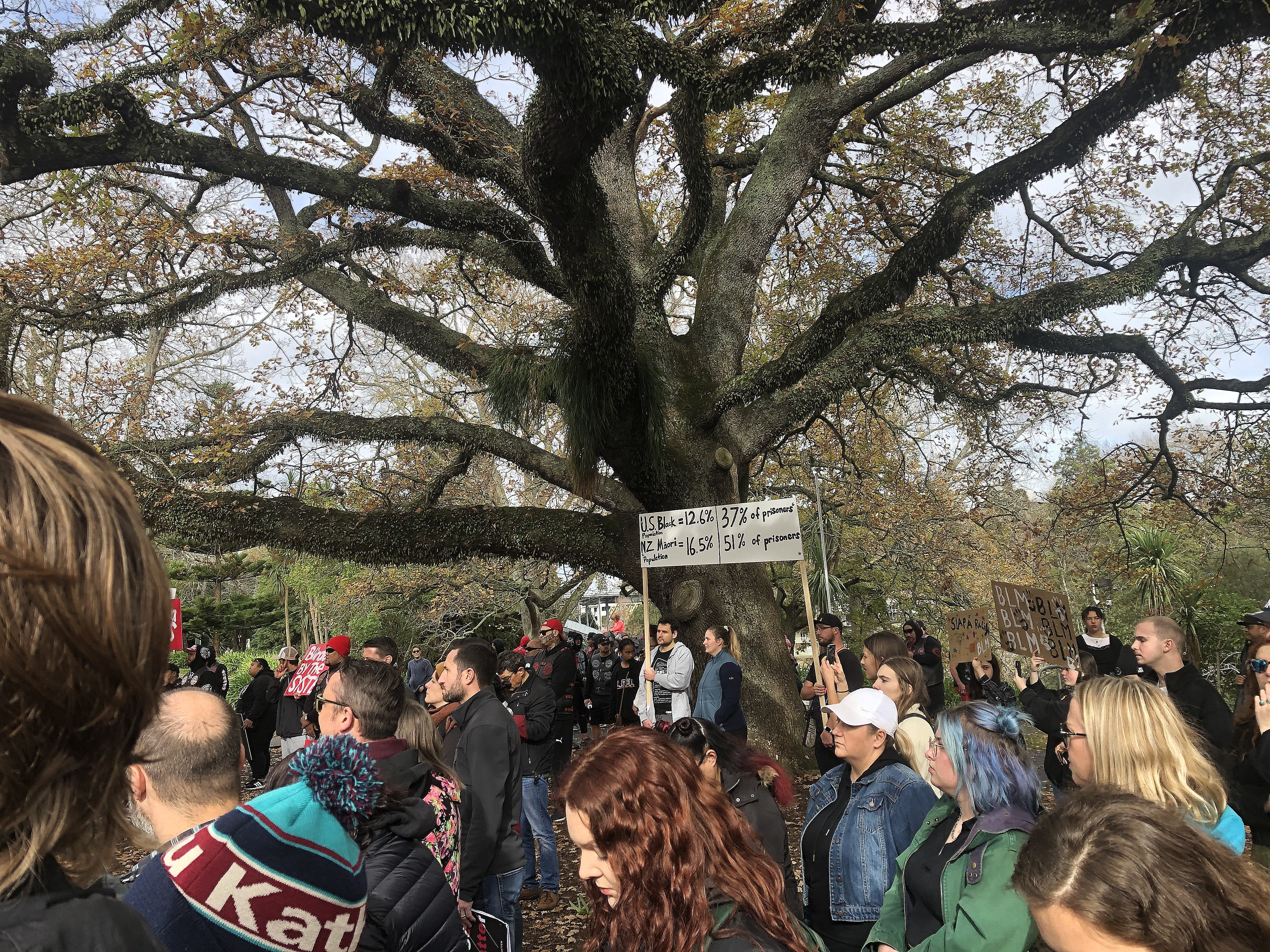
One of the placards in Hamilton highlighted the proportions of black populations relative to prison populations

=== 1 June ===
- Auckland: On Monday, 1 June, 4,000 protesters marched from Aotea Square down Queen Street to the American Consulate General.

The Auckland event was organised by several African New Zealanders including Mahlete Tekeste, African-American expatriate Kainee Simone, sportsperson Israel Adesanya, and musician Mazbou Q. Speakers linked the issues faced by African Americans to those faced by Māori and Pasifika peoples in New Zealand. The American flag in front of the consulate general appeared to have been removed prior to the protest. Protesters had signs including "Be kind", "Silence is Betrayal", and "Do Better, Be Better". Participants in this protest were in violation of social distancing protocols in place for the COVID-19 pandemic in New Zealand which limits gatherings to fewer than 100 people. Protesters performed a haka. A primary school teacher named Ethan Aloiai who wore a "Make America Great Again" hat had his hat seized and burned by protesters. Despite public interest, the Teaching Council declined to pursue disciplinary action against Aloiai.

- Christchurch: Despite the rain, more than 500 people gathered at a demonstration in Cathedral Square on 1 June.
- Dunedin: Hundreds of people protested peacefully in The Octagon.
- Queenstown: 150 people gathered near the Queenstown war memorial on June 8 holding up signs such as "Black lives matter" and "White silence is violence."
- Palmerston North: About 30 people protested at The Square. A separate group of 40 people peacefully protested outside the police station.
- Tauranga: About 25 to 30 protesters marched down The Strand.
- Wellington: Over 100 people marched from Frank Kitts Park to Parliament, Police National Headquarters, and the US Embassy. About 2000 people attended a vigil in the evening on Parliament's lawn, despite pouring rain.

=== 13 June ===
- Hamilton: As noted above, this protest was preceded by removal of the controversial Hamilton statue. At least 969 attended this event, though TV One News said 959. Drone footage suggests the numbers may have been rather higher. The hikoi started in Memorial Park and ended in Garden Place.

=== 14 June ===
- Auckland: About 5,000 people marched from Aotea Square to the United States consulate in Customs Street East. Speakers included Polynesian Panthers founding member Will 'Ilolahia who claimed that racism was a Pākehā (or White New Zealanders) problem. The Unite Union also contributed a music truck to the rally while Māori Wardens monitored the events.
- Dunedin: 250 protesters marched from the Otago Museum reserve to the Octagon. The organiser Eddie Ennion is a member of Dunedin's African community.
- Wellington: About 5,000 people marched from Te Ngākau Civic Square to the New Zealand Parliament Buildings, where they were greeted by Justice Minister Andrew Little and Greens Co-Leader James Shaw. Several African New Zealanders also performed a haka.
