= John Gallagher (businessman) =

New Zealand businessman and philanthropist

Sir John Gallagher KNZM KStJ
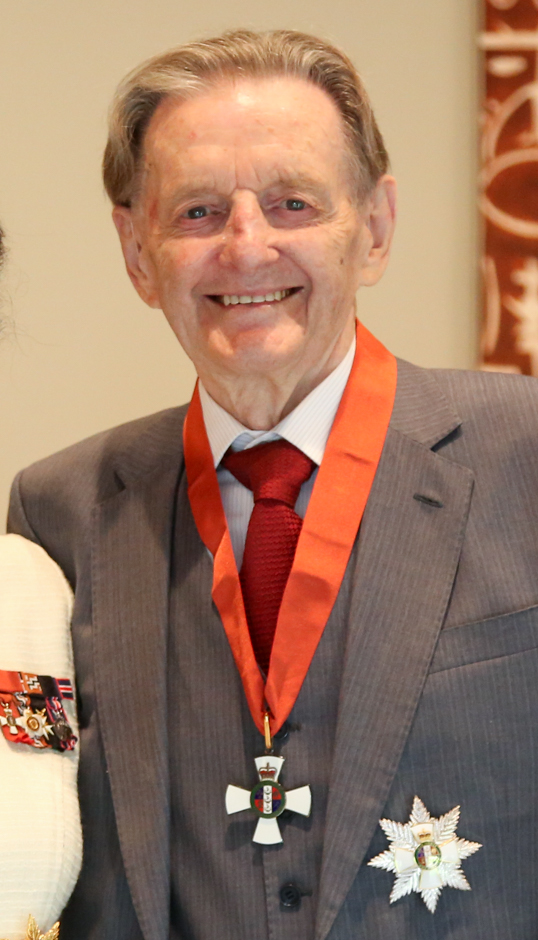
- Gallagher in 2025

9th Chancellor of the University of Waikato
- In office 2003–2006
- Preceded by: Caroline Bennett
- Succeeded by: John Jackman

Personal details
- Born: John Allan Gallagher; 1939 (age 86–87)
- Relatives: Bill Gallagher (father); Bill Gallagher (brother)
- Profession: Businessman

Sir John Allan Gallagher KNZM KStJ (born 1939) is a New Zealand businessman, philanthropist, and education advocate. He served as a Hamilton City councillor for 12 years and a Waikato regional councillor for three years. A member of the council of the University of Waikato for 25 years, he was chancellor of the university from 2003 to 2006.

== Early life and family ==
Gallagher was born in 1939, the son of Bill Gallagher and Millie Gallagher (née Murray), and raised in Waikato. His brother Bill was also knighted for services to business, in 2011.

== Business career ==
Gallagher joined the Gallagher Group, a company founded by his father in the 1960s, and worked alongside his brother, Bill. Gallagher Group became an international exporter of electric fencing, animal management, and security solutions. Gallagher held senior leadership roles within the company and continues to serve as a director of Gallagher Holdings Ltd.

In 2020, Gallagher was jointly inducted with his brother into the Waikato Business Hall of Fame.

== Later life ==
Gallagher served on the University of Waikato Council for 25 years, including a term as deputy chancellor, and later as chancellor from 2003 to 2006. He was awarded an honorary doctorate by the University of Waikato in 2008.

The Gallagher Academy of Performing Arts at the University features the Dr John Gallagher Concert Chamber, named in his honour. He currently serves as patron of the University of Waikato Foundation (Te Pou Taunaki).

Gallagher served as a trustee of Skycity Hamilton Community Trust from 2003 to 2009, Hamilton Garden's Te Parapara Garden Trust from 2006 to 2012, and as a councillor for the Young Enterprise Trust. He is a trustee of the Gallagher Charitable Trust, a fellow of the New Zealand Institute of Directors, and a director of Habitat for Humanity Hamilton.

== Honours and awards ==
In the 2002 Queen's Birthday Honours, Gallagher was appointed a Companion of the New Zealand Order of Merit, for services to local-body and community affairs. In 2008, he was awarded an honorary doctorate by the University of Waikato. The same year, he received the freedom of Hamilton City, and in 2014, he was awarded the inaugural Hamilton Medal by Hamilton City Council for an outstanding contribution to Hamilton.

Gallagher was made an Officer of the Order of St John in 1999, promoted to Commander of the order in 2006, and further promoted to Knight of the Order of St John in 2010.

Gallagher was promoted to Knight Companion of the New Zealand Order of Merit, for services to business, education, philanthropy, and the community, in the 2025 New Year Honours.
