= Henry Greer =

Henry Greer may refer to:

- Henry Greer (politician) (1855–1933), Irish soldier, politician, and racing horse owner and breeder
- Henry Greer (field hockey) (1899–1978), American field hockey player
- Henry Greer (British Army officer) (1821–1886), Irish officer who served in the British Army

== See also ==
- Harry Greer (1876–1947), British businessman and politician
