= David Ballantyne =

New Zealand journalist and writer

- Born: 14 June 1924; Auckland
- Died: 24 February 1986 (aged 61)
- Other name: David Watt Ballantyne
- Occupation: Journalist

David Watt Ballantyne (14 June 1924 – 24 February 1986) was a New Zealand journalist, novelist and short story writer.

Ballantyne was born in Auckland, New Zealand on 14 June 1924. He was Māori affiliated to the iwi Ngāti Uenukukōpako and Ngāti Hinepare of Te Arawa.

After a brief episode in the military and after not completing his medical studies, he began his career as a journalist at the Auckland Star. In 1948, he published his first novel, The Cunninghams in the United States. He finished Freeman’s Bay, a novel about Auckland working-class life, in 1950, but it was not accepted by either his American or his New Zealand publisher.

Ballantyne married the painter Jean Vivienne Margaret Heise in 1950, with whom he had a son. In 1954 he moved with his family to London, where he continued working as a journalist and author. In 1966, the family returned to New Zealand.

Ballantyne died at his home in Ponsonby in inner-city Auckland in 1986.

He published eight novels, of which the first The Cunninghams and the fifth, Sydney Bridge Upside Down are recognised as New Zealand literary classics. He also published a story collection, And the Glory, in 1963.

Sydney Bridge Upside Down was adapted by director James Ashcroft into a stage-play for Taki Rua and presented at the Hannah Playhouse in 2013.

== Personal ==
His great-grandmother was Hēni Te Kiri Karamu.

== Novels by David Ballantyne ==
- The Cunninghams (1948)
- The Last Pioneer (1963)
- A Friend of the Family (1966)
- Sydney Bridge Upside Down (1968)
- The Talkback Man (1978)
- The Penfriend (1980)
