= John Fane Charles Hamilton =

British navy commander (1820–1864)

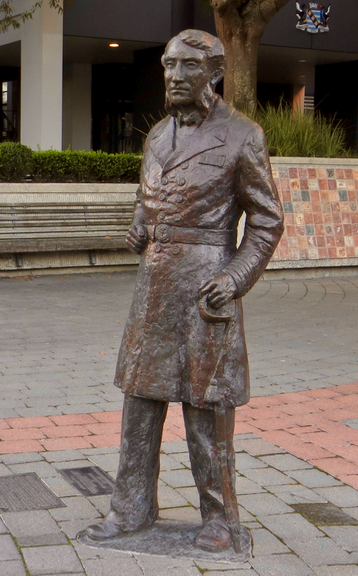
Statue of Captain Hamilton in 2017

John Fane Charles Hamilton (28 September 1820 – 29 April 1864) was a British naval officer, after whom the city of Hamilton, New Zealand, is named. A statue of him stood in the centre of Hamilton from 2013 to 2020.

== Biography ==
=== Early life ===
Hamilton was born in 1820 in Hildersham, Cambridgeshire, England, where he was christened on 15 July 1821. His parents were Colonel John Potter Hamilton (es) (1778–1873) and Charlotte Hamilton (nee Fane) (1787–1869, a daughter of Oxfordshire farmer and Tory MP John Fane), who married on 28 December 1813. Rear-Admiral Francis Fane (1778–1844) was his uncle.

=== Naval career ===
Hamilton joined the Royal Navy on 28 August 1835, presumably as a midshipman. He served in the First Opium War, taking part in "the taking of Amoy, the storming of Chinghae, the attack on the Chinese entrenched camp on the heights of Segoan, the capture of Chapoo, and the engagement with the enemy’s batteries at Woosung" whilst serving under Captain Thomas Bourchier of HMS Blonde, and in the boat action under Captain George Goldsmith which destroyed "10 fire-vessels with which the Chinese had attempted to annihilate the British shipping and transports at their anchorage off Chinghae".

Although Hamilton passed his examination for lieutenant on 10 November 1841, he then served as Mate aboard HMS Warspite under Captain Provo Wallis and HMS St Vincent (then the flag-ship of Sir Charles Rowley) on the Lisbon and Portsmouth stations. Hamilton was promoted to Lieutenant on 8 March 1844, and subsequently served on the South American Station, aboard HMS America (under Captain John Gordon) from 24 May 1844 to 1 August 1844, and then HMS Racer (under Captain Archibald Reed) from 1 August 1844 until the summer of 1846. He afterwards became senior lieutenant of HMS Leander.

Hamilton served in the Crimean War as part of the Naval Brigade at the Siege of Sevastopol. He was promoted to Commander on 27 November 1854, and commanded HMS Elk in the East Indies and in China during the Second Anglo-Chinese War.

Hamilton was again promoted to Captain on 26 February 1858.

=== Marriage and children ===
In 1855, Hamilton married Laura Parry (1831–1918) in Bicester, Oxfordshire, England. Their children included:

1. Laura Maria Hamilton (1856–?), christened at St Peter in Kent, England, on 14 September 1856;
2. John Fane Charles Hamilton (1859–1921), born in Belmont, Hampshire on 14 August 1859. He was a Lieutenant Colonel. On 3 June 1890 John married Gertrude Catherine Mary Angela Stuart (1870–1919), eldest daughter of John Stuart, D.L. J.P. of Ballechin, Co. Perth. He served in the Nile Expedition 1884–85, with 1st Battalion South Staffordshire Regiment; retired pay, 1886; Major 3rd and 4th Battalion (Militia) Lancashire Fusiliers, 1894–1898; Hon Lieut-Colonel, 1898; J.P. (1894) Hampshire; C.A. Isle of Wight Club; Naval and Military. According to the England and Wales Census of 1911, 56-year-old John was living in the Isle of Wight. His address was Spencer Lodge, Spencer-road, Ryde, Isle of Wight. Gertrude died in October 1919. John died on 20 November 1921 and was buried with his mother and Gertrude in Ryde Old Cemetery (Section N Plot 1965a); and
3. Arthur C Hamilton (1862–?), born in Ryde, Isle of Wight, in 1862.

=== New Zealand Wars and death ===
From 22 May 1863, Hamilton took command of HMS Esk (from commissioning in Portsmouth), and was ordered to the New Zealand Wars.

Hamilton directly commanded a detachment of the 43rd Regiment and a party of sailors at the Battle of Gate Pā. He was struck in the head by a bullet during the battle and died on 29 April 1864. Hamilton was buried at the Mission Cemetery in Tauranga.

The Daily Southern Cross reported on 3 May 1864:

Captain Hamilton wore several mementoes of his gallantry, and the last and fatal act which distinguishes him as a gallant officer cannot be better described than in the words of our special correspondent – "The General, who was in the advanced trench of his position, ordered up the supports almost immediately after the storming party rushed the breach; and the second division of blue-jackets and the gallant 43rd, led by Captain Hamilton, of the 'Esk,' advanced with a ringing cheer to the support of the forlorn hope. They arrived at a critical moment; the storming party exposed to a murderous fire on all sides, and from hidden assailants beneath, and without an officer left to lead them, were wavering; part were outside the pa. Captain Hamilton sprung upon the parapet, and shouting 'follow me, men!' dashed into the fight. That moment was his last. He fell dead, pierced through the brain by a bullet, and many of his officers shared the same fate."

Hamilton's cousin Robert Thomas Francis Hamilton (1835–1864) was killed during the same battle; he was a captain of the 43rd Light Infantry Regiment.

== Legacy ==
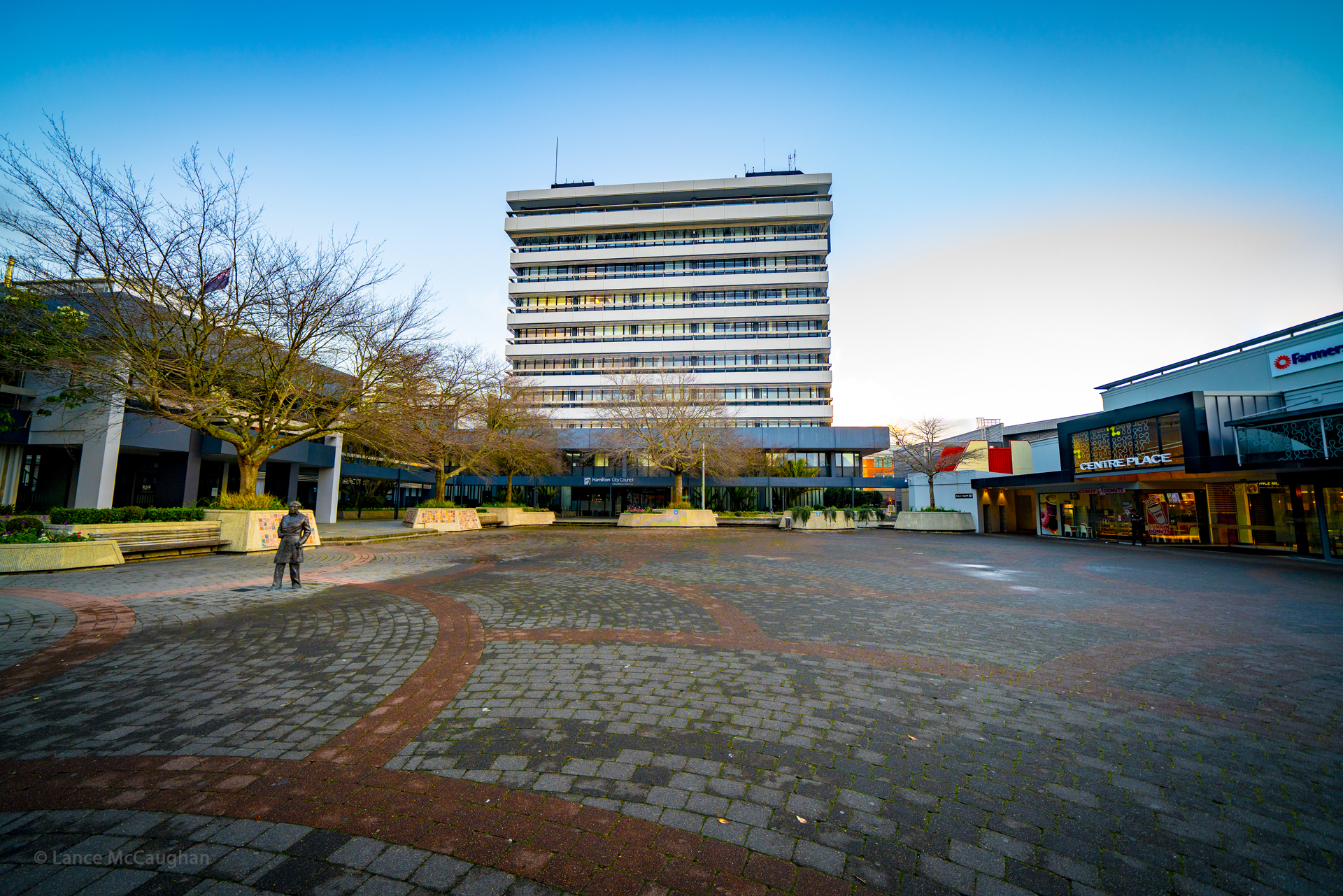
Civic Square in Hamilton

The city of Hamilton, founded in 1864 at the end of the Waikato War, was named after him as is Hamilton Street in Tauranga. The Waikato Museum holds Hamilton's sword, medals and belt, which were donated by family members.

In 2013 a life-size bronze statue of John was given to Hamilton by the Gallagher Group "to celebrate 75 years in business". It was produced by Margriet Windhausen and stood in Civic Square, Hamilton. On 12 June 2020, the city council in Hamilton removed the statue of Captain Hamilton at the request of local Māori iwi Waikato Tainui. Local Māori elder Taitimu Maipi, who had vandalised the statue in 2018, has called for the city to be renamed Kirikiriroa.

== Bibliography ==
- McCauley, Debbie (2012). "John Fane Charles Hamilton (1820-1864)". (last updated 2020, and see bibliography therein)
- O'Byrne, William R. (1849). "Hamilton, John Fane Charles" . A Naval Biographical Dictionary. London: John Murray. p. 452.
- John Fane Charles Hamilton R.N., The Royal Navy
