= Statue of John Fane Charles Hamilton =

Statue formerly installed in Hamilton, New Zealand

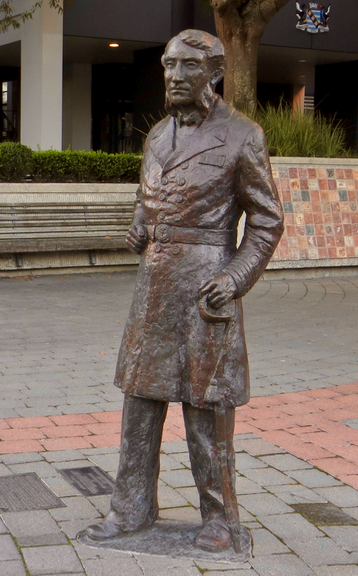
- The statue in 2017
- Former location of the statue in Hamilton, New Zealand
- Artist: Margriet Windhausen
- Year: 2013
- Medium: Bronze sculpture
- Subject: John Fane Charles Hamilton
- Location: Hamilton, New Zealand; 37.78773°S 175.281219°E

A bronze statue of Captain John Fane Charles Hamilton was installed for seven years, in Hamilton, New Zealand, from in 2013 until removal in June 2020. The settlement of Hamilton (now a city) was named after Captain Hamilton, a Royal Navy officer who was killed in action during the Battle of Gate Pā.

== History ==
The life-size statue by Margriet Windhausen was gifted to Hamilton City by the Gallagher Group in 2013 "to celebrate 75 years in business".

=== Removal ===
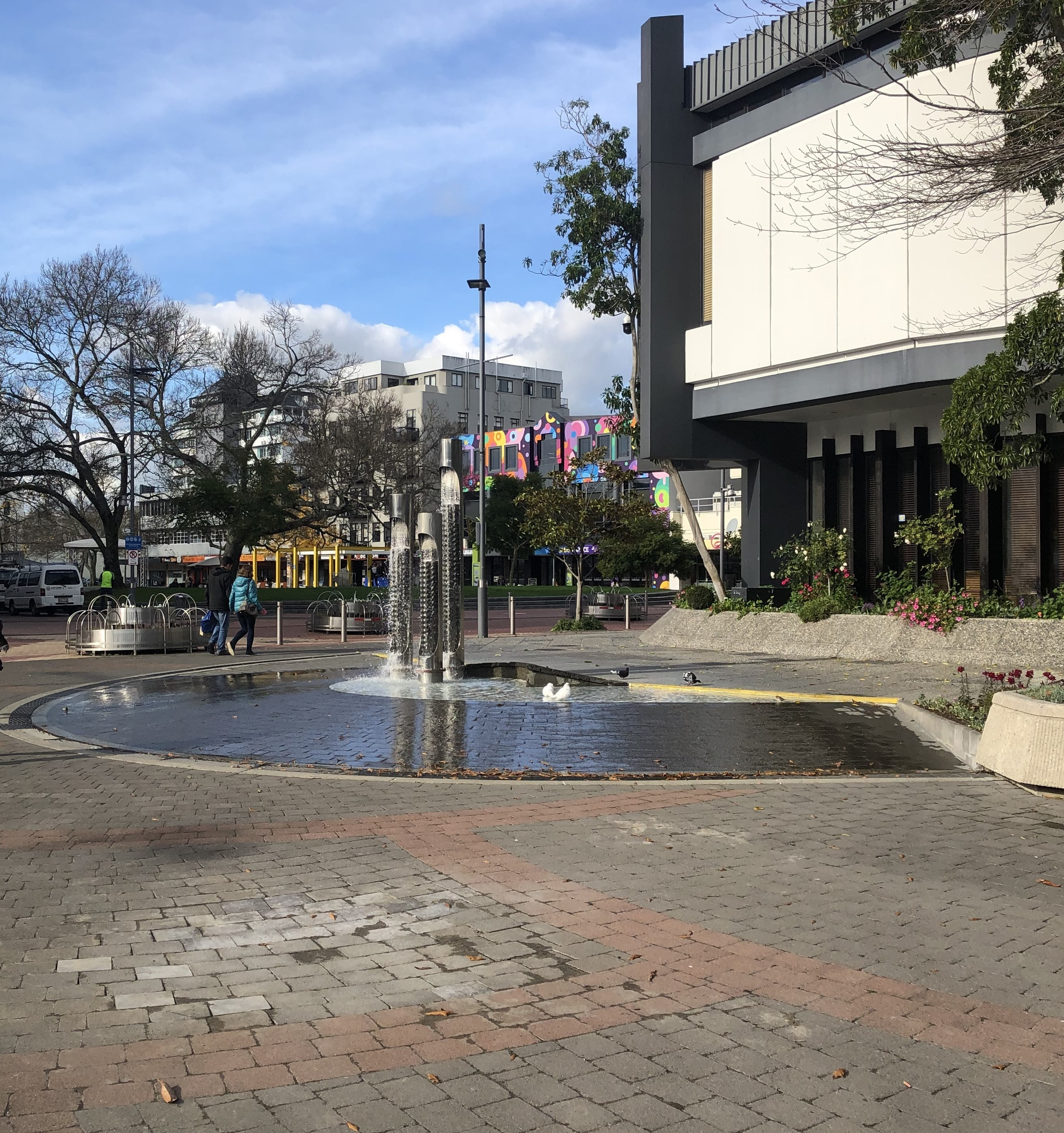
Garden Place former site of Hamilton statue

In 2017, the donor's CEO, Sir William Gallagher, gave an Institute of Directors speech describing the Treaty of Waitangi as a fraud and denied it involved a partnership between Māori and the Crown. About a dozen directors walked out of the speech in protest.

The statue was defaced with red paint in August 2018 by the activist Taitimu Maipi.

In June 2020, ahead of a George Floyd protest in the US, the Hamilton City Council discussed the statue with Sir William's brother and fellow director, John Gallagher, then slated it for removal, after a request by Māori tribal confederation Waikato Tainui.

On 12 June 2020, the Hamilton City Council removed the statue of Captain Hamilton.

== See also ==
- List of monuments and memorials removed during the George Floyd protests
- George Floyd protests in New Zealand
