= Hōri Ngātai =

New Zealand warrior, farmer, and orator

Hōri Ngātai (? – 1912) was a New Zealand Ngāi Te Rangi warrior, farmer and orator. He was the son of Tūtahi, one of the signers of the Treaty of Waitangi in April 1840 at Tauranga.

During the Invasion of the Waikato (1863 to 1864), Ngātai led a group of Ngāi Te Rangi and Pirirākau warriors, fighting alongside the Kīngitanga movement. He was present at the Battle of Gate Pā (1864), later giving an account of this to Gilbert Mair. Ngāi Te Rangi were defeated by crown troops at the Battle of Te Ranga, after which he declared that Ngāi Te Rangi would never engage in war again. After the wars, Ngātai focused on improving relations between Māori and Pākehā, and focused on maintaining the tribal rights of Ngāi Te Rangi, building the Rauru Kītahi marae in Tauranga, close to the Te Papa Mission Station. By the late 1800s, Ngātai was the largest wheat and maize farmer in the Tauranga district.
