= Rawiri Puhirake =

Māori tribal leader (killed 1864)

- Died: 21 June 1864; Te Ranga
- Burial place: Te Ranga (1864–74); Plot 57, Mission Cemetery, Marsh Street, Tauranga, New Zealand
- Monuments: Mission Cemetery
- Notable work: Gate Pā, Tauranga

Rawiri Puhirake (died 21 June 1864) was a New Zealand Māori tribal leader. He identified with the Ngāi Te Rangi iwi. He was killed in the Battle of Te Ranga.

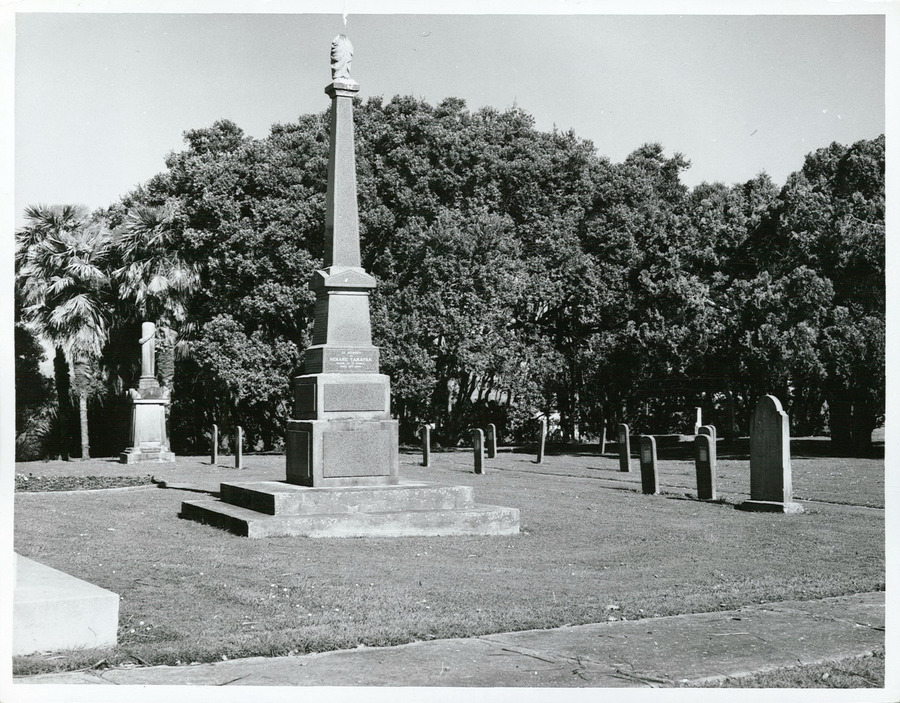
The monument at Mission Cemetery, Tauranga, in August 1967. Photo: T. Ahern
