= Dead as Disco =

- Developer: Brain Jar Games
- Publisher: Brain Jar Games
- Engine: Unreal Engine 5
- Platform: Microsoft Windows
- Release: May 5, 2026 (early access)
- Genres: Beat 'em up, rhythm
- Mode: Single-player

Dead as Disco is a beat 'em up rhythm video game released in early access on May 5, 2026. The game lets players attack waves of enemies in time with the music, where they can fight their way through each of the game's levels to the tune of songs written specifically for the game, alongside licensed music and a custom soundtrack feature where players can import their own songs.

The game in its early access form has received "overwhelmingly positive" user reviews on Steam, where it has drawn comparisons to Hi-Fi Rush, Batman: Arkham Asylum and Sifu and has also been likened to creating a music video.

== Premise ==
The game is heavily themed around a dystopian cyberpunk setting where a drummer known as Charlie Disco (Hunter McCoy) rises from the dead for one night after making a Faustian bargain with a skull-like entity named Vice (Hunter Peterson), and sets out to confront his former bandmates who sold themselves out to a fictional megacorporation known as Harmony and mounted a memorial concert for their fallen bandmate ten years after Charlie's death under mysterious circumstances.

As of early access, the game's boss characters comprise of Hemlock (Peterson), an anarchist punk rocker; the band's bassist, Dex (Ricky Armellino; singing voice by Dave Stephens), lead guitarist who had cybernetic enhancements implanted on his body in his drive for perfection; Arora (Rachel Lee; singing voice by Judy Kim), an AI K-pop idol gynoid singer developed by Harmony; Prophet (Mazbou Q), rapper and record producer who serves as the band's manager, and Dahlia (Amy Selma; singing voice by Camila Paiva), keyboardist and dancer whose aesthetic and musical style is inspired by Latin American music.

== Gameplay ==
Gameplay screenshot showing protagonist Charlie Disco taking on punk rocker Hemlock.

Players perform combos, dodges, and finishers in order to battle waves of enemies. Attacks, such as punches or kicks, are synced in time with soundtracks that play throughout levels. Stronger enemies can charge players, requiring them to dodge. Some levels include interactive elements, such as trains that deal damage to players and enemies. Defeating each of the bosses grants the player a special attack acquired from them based on their abilities.

Completing levels grants players "fans" which are used as a form of in-game currency where they can be traded for items used to decorate the Encore Bar, a hub where the player can interact with other characters and perform side quests for them, customize their appearance and enhance their abilities through a skill tree system.

Alongside the main game mode is "Infinite Disco", a free play mode where players can take on waves of enemies in recreations of the story mode levels either to the tune of the game's soundtrack or to custom music acquired by the player. Players can either fight to the tune of one song once or in a loop, amounting to a survival mode. The mode also comes with modifiers and other variables as challenges to skilled players.

The game also has a leaderboard system allowing players to post scores of their performances online and compare them against friends and other players from around the world; leaderboard functionality is however disabled if in-game modifications are detected in order to encourage fair gameplay.

== Reception ==
The game saw favorable reception upon its demo and later early access release, with video game publications praising its gameplay and presentation. Pulasthi Ariyasinghe of Neowin compared the game favorably to Batman Arkham and Sifu; Ariyasinghe notes the more lenient timing the game affords its players in terms of attacking in time to music in order to make the game accessible to a wider audience, though he also notes that players are nonetheless rewarded for playing along with the beat and also commended the game's performance on PCs. IGN's Will Borger was similarly positive about the game by giving it an 8/10, stating "Even at its Early Access launch, it’s got the sick licks, fancy footwork, and consummate style to be a real contender," though he also noted the early access build's sparse plot and the free play mode "lack[ing] the sheer star power and production of the boss fights."
