= HMS Sappho (1837) =

Brig of the Royal Navy

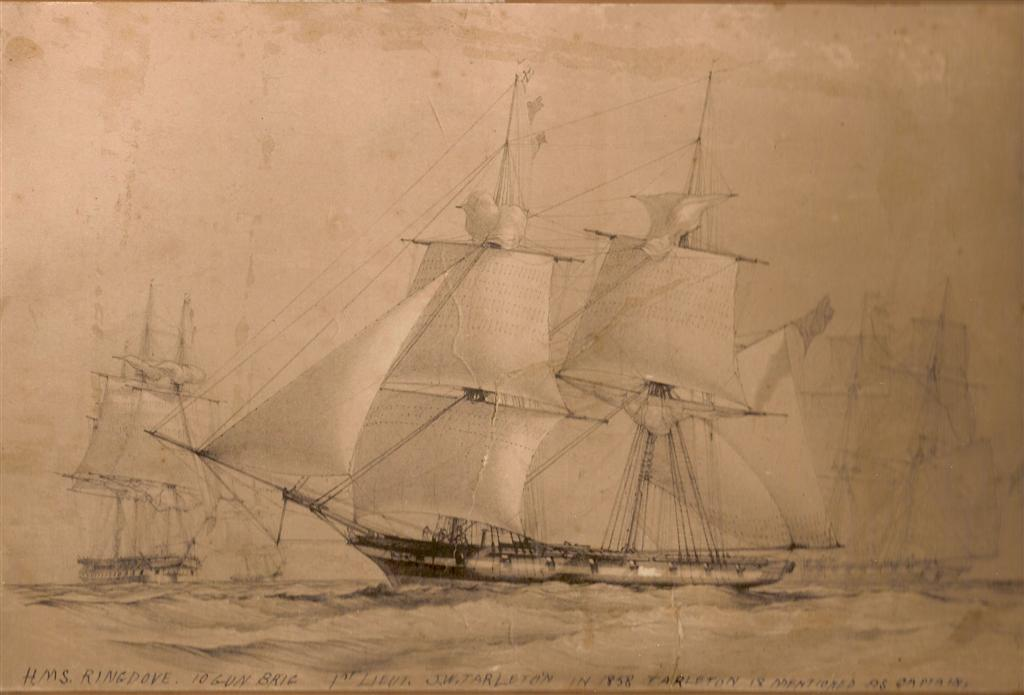
- HMS Ringdove, a sister-ship to HMS Sappho.

History

United Kingdom
- Ordered: 10 July 1832
- Builder: Devonport dockyard
- Laid down: December 1834
- Launched: 3 February 1837
- Fate: Foundered with all hands February 1858 off the SE Coast of Australia

General characteristics
- Tons burthen: 428 2/94 bm
- Length: 78 ft 7 in (23.95 m) (keel); 100 ft 6 in (30.63 m) (oa)
- Beam: 32 ft 4 in (9.86 m)
- Draught: 15 ft 4 in (4.67 m)
- Sail plan: Brig-rigged
- Complement: Varied. Normally about 110
- Armament: As built: 2 × 9-pounder (4.1 kg) guns; 14 × 32-pounder (15 kg) carronades

HMS Sappho was a Royal Navy brig that gained public notoriety for causing a diplomatic incident over the slave trade with the United States of America and then went missing off the Australian coast in 1857–58.

== Construction and service career ==
Sappho, one of a class of nine-second-class brigs, was built at the Plymouth Dockyard and over her 20-year career she was variously armed with 16 and later 12 guns. Sappho was the second Royal Navy vessel to be named after the famous Greek poet Sappho of the 6th and 7th century B.C., the first, a slightly smaller Star-class brig, having been broken up in 1830.

Sappho was one of a large number of warships designed by Sir William Symonds that were intended to be both very fast under sail and carry heavy firepower. One of the main drivers for their design was the suppression of slavery. During her 20-year career, Sappho was engaged in four commissions: West Indies and North American Station (1837–1842), Africa and Cape of Good Hope Stations (1843–1847), West Indies and North America Station (1849–1852) and African Station (1856–1857). Suppression of slavery was the main duty on the African and West Indies stations. On 6 December 1849 ^{[2]}, Sappho stranded on a cay in the Gulf of Honduras but was later refloated. Commander Mitchell was court martialled and dismissed from his ship. This was reported to have been harsh as most of his senior officers were dead or in hospital due to (alleged) Yellow Fever and Mitchell was still suffering with a broken arm from a gunnery accident.

== Diplomatic incident ==
Sappho left Portsmouth in March 1856 with a crew of about 140 under the command of Commander Fairfax Moresby, eldest son of Admiral Sir Fairfax Moresby, to be part of a British squadron patrolling the coast of West Africa to suppress the slave trade.

On 9 May 1857, Sappho seized the American barque Panchita at Porto de Lenha on the Congo River, commanded by Captain Sladden. Lieutenant Ireland and 12 men were transferred to Panchita and she was sailed to New York under arrest, arriving on 9 July. On the following day, the owner – J. P. Weeks – brought suit against the prize crew on the grounds of unlawful seizure, as a result of which they were arrested, and held in bail to $15,000. Ultimately, the American courts found for the owners, although compensation had not been settled over two years later. The incident was also raised in the United States Congress.

On 10 September Sappho legally intercepted a 150 long tons (150 t) schooner preparing to board slaves, and burned her. On 18 September Sappho legally engaged a much larger slaver, the 1,088-long-ton (1,105 t) full-rigged ship Charles of New Orleans, about 40 mi (64 km) from Loanda, Portuguese West Africa, and drove it ashore – about 380 slaves were rescued but about 150 were drowned. The Royal Navy later awarded prize money to the crew of Sappho for this capture.

== Disappearance of Sappho ==
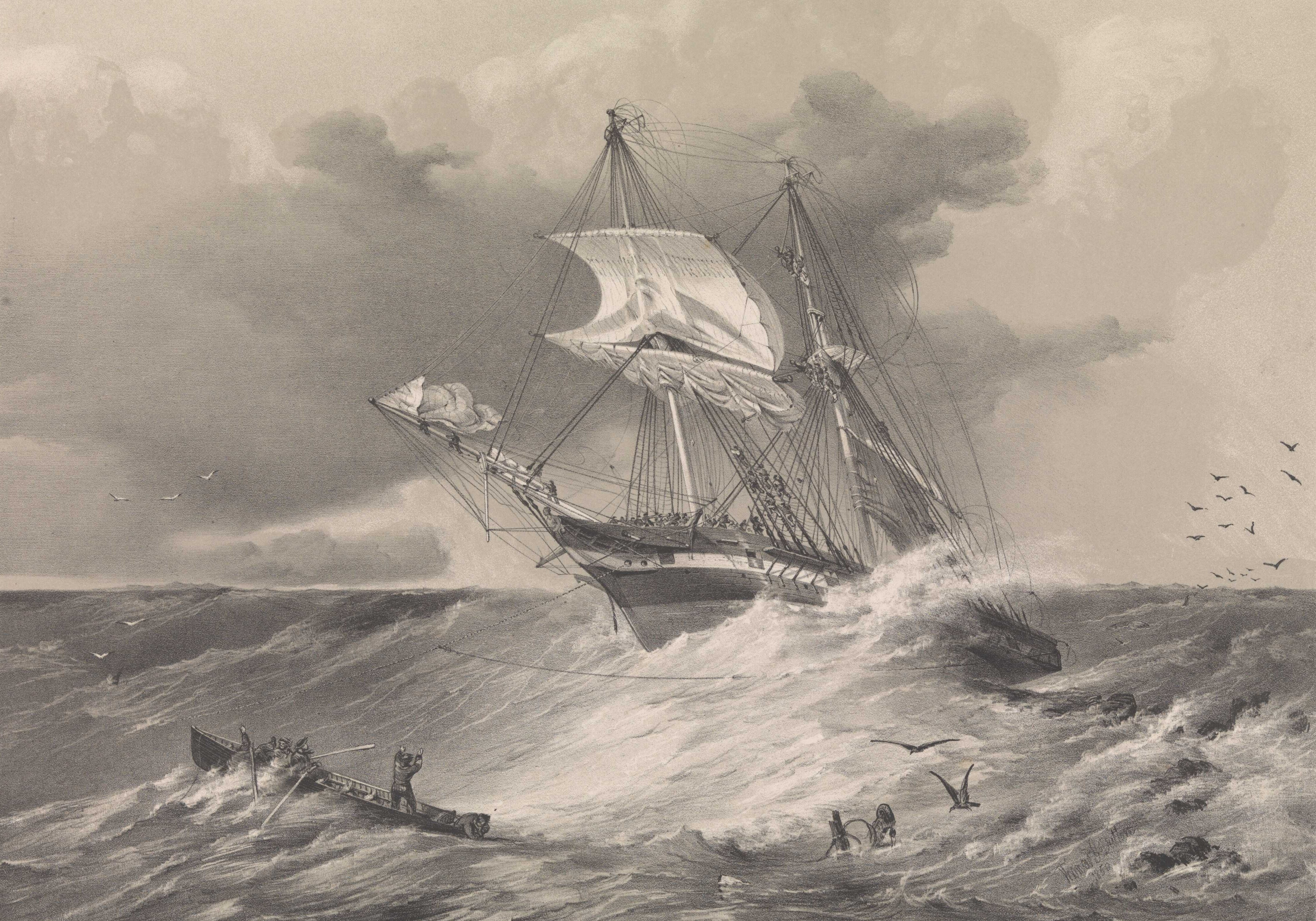
HMS Sappho being saved off the coast of Honduras, 11 December 1849

Commander Moresby was censured for his handling of the Panchita incident and Sappho was ordered to proceed to the Australian Station. She sailed from the Cape of Good Hope for Sydney on 8 January 1858 but failed to arrive. As she was not expected in Sydney, her non-appearance caused no concern until late in the year. In October 1858, Admiral W Loring in Sydney was informed that Sappho had been seen by the crew of the schooner Yarrow off Cape Bridgewater, Victoria at the western entrance to Bass Strait on 18 February. Extensive searches by a number of vessels including HMS Elk and HMVS Victoria failed to find any trace of the missing vessel.

Late in 1858, rumours began spreading in England that the vessel had been wrecked on "an island off the coast of Australia," that some survivors had been rescued and that Capt. Moresby had gone insane. These rumours did the rounds of the international press for over a year as they were picked up and passed along. There was no truth to any of these rumours.

== Cause of the disaster ==
Naval authorities believed it most likely that Sappho had hit one of the many rocks and islets in Bass Strait and foundered with all hands. Modern reconstructions of events believe it more likely that she capsized during gales that lashed Bass Strait on the days immediately after she was last seen. Naval brigs such as Sappho were unstable due to the combination of fine hull-lines, heavy armament and high sail area. Between 1856 and 1860, three similar vessels went missing without trace and a fourth, HMS Camilla, capsized off the West Coast of Africa on 9 May 1859 with the loss of about 50 of her crew.

The Apollo Bay Historical Society asserts on its Historical Shipwrecks Roll of Honour that Sappho disappeared in between Cape Otway and Cape Patton, off the Victoria Coast near the Otway Ranges. They are unsure as to how this claim is made, although residents of the townships at Wye River and Kennett River claim to be descendants of a ship of the Royal Navy.
