= HMS Elk (1847) =

Brig-sloop of the Royal Navy

History

United Kingdom
- Name: HMS Elk
- Builder: Chatham Dockyard
- Launched: 29 September 1847
- Decommissioned: May 1893
- Fate: Sold in 1893 for breaking up

General characteristics
- Class & type: Acorn-class brig-sloop
- Tons burthen: 482 BM
- Length: 105 ft (32 m)
- Beam: 33 ft (10 m)
- Propulsion: Sail
- Armament: 16 guns

HMS Elk was a 482-ton displacement, 16-gun Acorn-class brig-sloop of the Royal Navy launched on 29 September 1847 from the Chatham Dockyard.

She was sent to the East Indies Station and China Station and participated during the Second Opium War (commanded by John Fane Charles Hamilton) until being assigned to the Australia Station in 1859. She searched for HMS Sappho with HMVS Victoria after Sappho disappeared in Bass Strait in February 1858. In 1860 she participated during the First Taranaki War. She left the Australia Station in March 1860 and upon arriving in England was paid off.

She was transferred to Her Majesty's Coastguard in 1863 and was renamed WV.13 and she was later renamed WV.28. She was sold in May 1893.
