= Mazbou Q =

Nigerian New Zealand hip hop artist

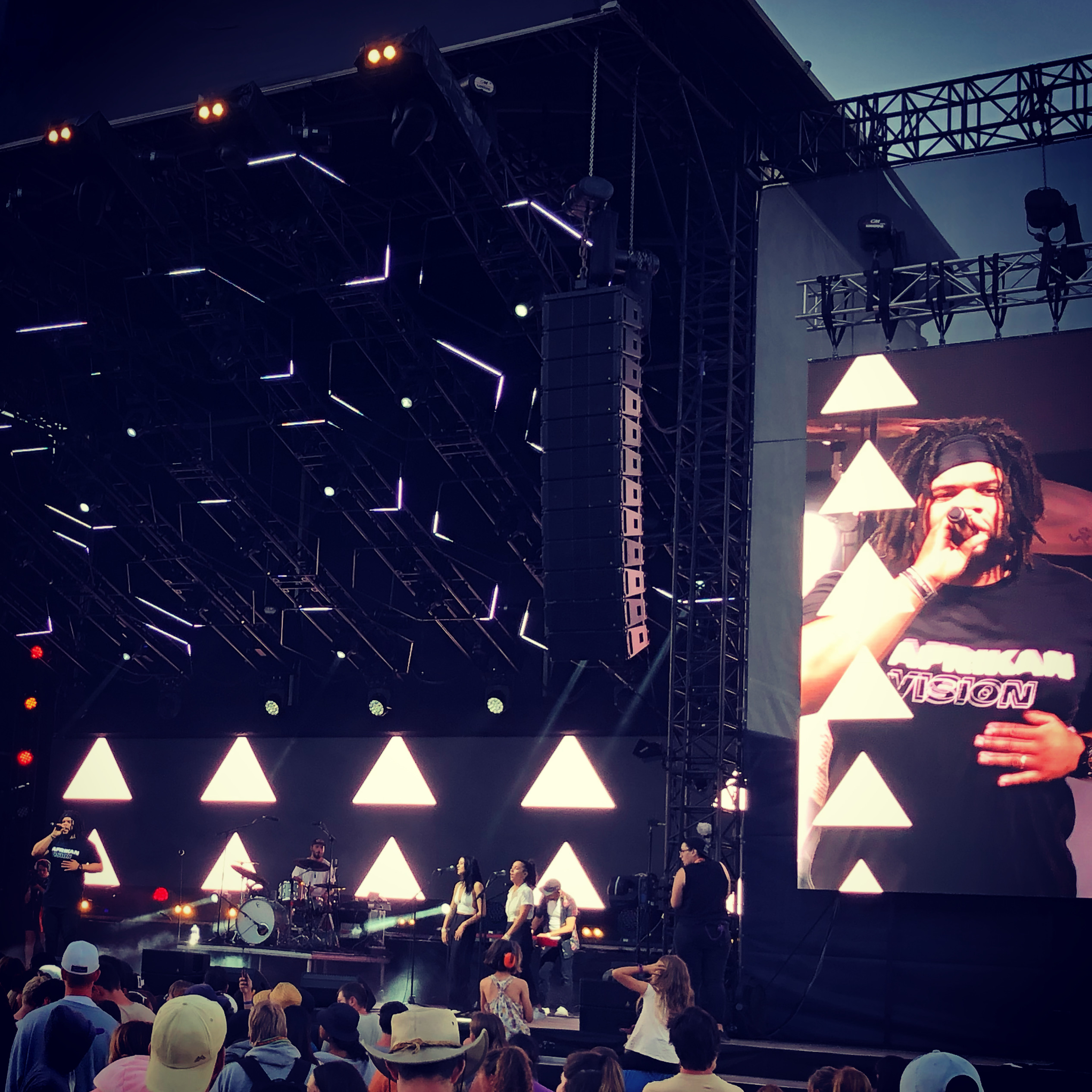
- Mazbou Q on the Festival One main stage.
- Born: Hugh Okechukwu Ozumba; May 12, 1989 (age 37); Liverpool, England
- Other names: Hugh Ozumba, Unchained XL
- Occupations: Rapper; singer; producer; content creator; educator
- Years active: 2016–present
- Organization: Unchained XL Production Co.
- Spouse: Jess Ozumba (m. 2014)
- Children: 1
- Musical career
- Genres: Pop rap; hip hop; alternative hip hop; afrobeat; pop
- Instruments: Vocals; bass guitar; piano
- Labels: Unchained XL, Mazbou Q, Independent, St Paul’s Music
- Website: https://www.mazbouq.com

Hugh Okechukwu Ozumba (born May 12, 1989), known professionally as Mazbou Q, and formerly Unchained XL, is a UK-born, Auckland-based Nigerian New Zealand rapper, singer, producer, and social media content creator and educator.

== Early life ==
Mazbou Q and his parents are from Nimo village of Anambra state of Nigeria, which is Igboland also known as Biafra. His parents moved to England, where he and his sister were born, Mazbou Q in Liverpool. The family moved to New Zealand in the early 1990s and Mazbou Q grew up in Manurewa, Auckland. He says there weren’t many Africans in the country at that time, so he saw himself as a pioneer in establishing a Black culture in Aotearoa New Zealand.

Musically, Mazbou Q started with classical piano, then moved into heavy metal, fronting the Auckland band East of Eden. After creating some raps with a friend, he made the switch to hip hop in 2016, with influences from West African Highlife and East Coast-inspired boom bap.

== Music career ==
=== Unchained XL ===
Mazbou Q chose the professional name Unchained XL in 2016. He had been producing music for some time and liked the independence he saw in self-producing and performing hip hop live. On the other hand he found the independence isolating and lonely at times, so sought to form collaborations. His metal experience influenced the energy he brought to live shows, which were a priority for him as an artist.

In 2016 and 2017, he released a series of singles, was included in the Alt Carols Christmas albums and events at St Paul's Auckland, and performed live at Festival One at Mystery Creek. Unchained XL called his unique music style "Afrofunk hip hop'' and "Afro-roots hip hop", a blend of the West Africa Afrobeat of the ‘70s and early ‘80s, and modern hip hop, utilising a combination of live instruments and synths.

In 2018 he left his full-time job at music software company Serato to become a full-time rapper. As Unchained XL, he released his 2018 debut EP "Foreign Legacy", including the acclaimed "What You Said". He also toured the UK with shows in London, Bristol, Sheffield, Leeds and Cardiff, performing with artists Mungos HiFi, Afro Cluster and Eva Lazarus, and supported by his live band.

In 2019, as Unchained XL, he continued to produce singles and a second EP titled "The Migrant Mind", and a music video called "2 To The 6".

=== Mazbou Q ===
In 2020 he changed his professional name to Mazbou Q which he explained was "encoded from my birth name", but left its meaning unexplained. The change coincided with the release of singles, "To The Gates", and "Blacklight" featuring Mo Muse and Phodiso. The two tracks and their videos received tens of thousands of streams across multiple platforms, and were included in Mazbou Q's distinct Afrofuturism debut EP, "Afroternity", featuring Oklahoma rapper and producer Kevin Posey. At the time Mazbou Q said, “My music remains unapologetic in its political message – one of anti-racism and black consciousness. On previous records it hasn’t left much space for confidence in self, perhaps as a subconscious concession to New Zealand’s tall poppy syndrome. In "Afroternity", I evolve past that – I’m not afraid to shine on this EP.”

Mazbou Q released his self-produced debut album, "The Future Was", in July 2021. Featured artists included Raiza Biza on "G.O.A.T Problems", Jane Deezy on "Letter to My Future Self, Pt. II", Myele Manzanza on "Just Let It Go", and Cee Blu on "Best Of You". The album was noted as a rare New Zealand rap album because it sounded so "focused and fighting fit", helped by the high energy seen in Mazbou Q's live performances.

From 2020 to July 2022 Mazbou Q featured on nine singles, EPs and studio albums by other artists. He was in the New Zealand Womad lineup for 2022 which was cancelled because of COVID-19 disruptions. He was in the New Zealand Womad lineup for 2023.

In 2026 Mazbou Q lent his voice for the character of Prophet in the rhythmic beat 'em up video game Dead as Disco.

== Musical influences ==
Mazbou Q has taken inspiration from the likes of Afrobeat artist and activist Fela Kuti, as well as Ghanaian rapper M.anifest, American Afrobeat band Antibalas and 90s hip hop group A Tribe Called Quest. Later inspiration included Wisconsin rapper and fellow Nigerian Jidenna, Tobe Nwigwe, Sarkodie as well as African American rappers like Royce da 5’9 and Propaganda. Mazbou Q has been heavily influenced by his Christian faith, and saw his music being a vehicle for positive messages and redemption. In 2018 he said, “I think that Christianity provides a framework for me to strive for racial justice issues, which is important for me being a person of colour. There’s a lot of issues around black liberation that need to be explored, and for me viewing them through the lens of Christianity gives me an interesting perspective I feel.”

In 2022, his inspiration also includes The Roots and Black Star.

== Production career ==
In 2022, Mazbou Q was the lead producer at his Auckland-based audio production house Unchained XL Production Co. and said he has worked with ESPN, Footlocker and Les Mills.

As of October 2023, Mazbou Q had 211,900 followers on TikTok, where under the title "The Rap Scientist", he had analysed and dissected various rhyme and rhythmic techniques used in hit rap songs, including music theory concepts like syncopation, polymetric rhythms, displacement and micro-rhythms. In August 2023, Mazbou Q announced a short speaking tour in the US including Louisiana State University, Southern University and Berklee College of Music.

== Activism ==
Mazbou Q was one of the organisers of the Black Lives Matter George Floyd protests in Auckland on 1 June and 14 June 2020. He spoke about the ongoing persecution of the Black African communities, including: "The same white supremacy which has led to disproportionate killings of Black people in the US exists here in New Zealand." He called on Prime Minister Jacinda Ardern to condemn violence against Black Americans. He also spoke and wrote about the appropriation of Black American culture, including hip hop ghetto culture born from the oppressed minorities the South Bronx in the 1970s, and the lack of exposure for New Zealand Black African hip hop artists compared to Māori and Pasifika artists. As a result, schools invited him, and other organisers, to speak to their students and staff.

== Personal life ==
Mazbou Q married Jess Johnston in 2014 and their daughter was born in 2020 and they lived in Auckland. In 2018, Mazbou Q identified as a Christian, which influenced his music and provided a framework for racial justice issues. In 2022 he described himself as being "Nigerian NZ" "from Tāmaki Makaurau".

== Discography ==
=== Unchained XL ===
- Walk Out, single (2016)
- Learn to Shine, single (2016)
- Bring on the Summer (feat. Elaia) single (2017)
- Alt Carols, Vol. 1, compilation album (2017)
- Foreign Legacy, EP (2018)
- Stylebender (feat. Nuel Nonso) single (2018)
- Alt Carols, Vol. 1.5, compilation EP (2018)
- The Migrant Mind, EP (2019)
- Weight On My Bars, Pt. IV (feat. Thabani Gapara) single (2019)
- We Be On (with Kevin Posey) single (2019)
- Trip (with Kevin Posey) single (2019)
- Letter to My Future Self (with Kevin Posey, feat. John Givez & Chozxn) single (2019)
- That's My Folk (with Kevin Posey) single (2019)
- Alt Carols, Vol. 2, compilation album (2019)

=== Mazbou Q ===
Sources:

- Blacklight (feat. Mo Muse & Phodiso) single (2020)
- Bruised Soles (with Regi Angelou, feat. Jani Blair) single (2020)
- To The Gates, single (2020)
- Afroternity, EP (2020)
- Icon Status, single (2020)
- The Fire of Time (feat. Manuela & Kevin Posey) single (2021)
- In My Head, Chika Adeosun, EP (2021)
- Letter to My Future Self, Pt. II (feat. Kevin Posey, Jane Deezy & K.Y.T) single (2021)
- Just Let it Go (feat. Phodiso, Myele Manzanza, Tyler Trench & Fae) single (2021)
- Deserter, single (2021)
- Pour One Out, single (2021)
- Beat Up, Bullied and Dunked On (feat. Vallé & Scizzorhands) single (2021)
- The Get Up, single (2021)
- G.O.A.T Problems (feat. Raiza Biza) single (2021)
- Don't Stop Regardless, single (2021)
- The Future Was, studio album (2021)
- Go and Be Free, single (2022)
- Anybody (feat. Gino October) single (2022)
- Simply Superior (with Survivr6 & xJ-Will) single (2022)
- Now I Know (with Jessie Booth) single (2022)
- Waves (with Wanja Wohoro) single (2022)
- Weight On My Bars, Pt. 6, single (2023)
- Metahuman (with Survivr6 & xJ-Will) EP (2023)
- Nightwaves (with Jessie Booth) EP (2023)
- The Sum of Unfinished Businesses (feat. Kevin Posey, Phodisco & Ch! Nonso) EP (2023)

=== Featured artist ===
Sources:

- Breath, Kevin Posey, studio album (2020)
- Lost, Rob1on1, single (2020)
- Trust Me, MC Sweaty Brix, single (2020)
- A Little Care, Whoa! Studios, single (2020)
- Your Shine, Kevin Posey, single (2020)
- In My Head, Chika Adeosun, EP (2020)
- Disappear, Ryan Whitehead, studio album (2021)
- Yeah, Scizzorhands & Kevin Posey, studio album (2021)
- Iron Flowers, Scizzorhands & Kevin Posey, single (2021)
- Grains EP, Pacific Heights, EP (2021)
- Self Reflected, Luisa Tona, single (2022)
- AEIOU, Moana & The Tribe, single (2022)
- Be Somebody, D.Matthews, single (2022)
- Two Strangers & Solo, VIËW, single (2023)
- Certified Cypher, yyungeze, single (2023)
- Drill Ne Ngoma, Killa & Legend'Son, EP (2023)
