= Henry Greer (British Army officer) =

British Army general (1821–1886)

Henry Greer CB
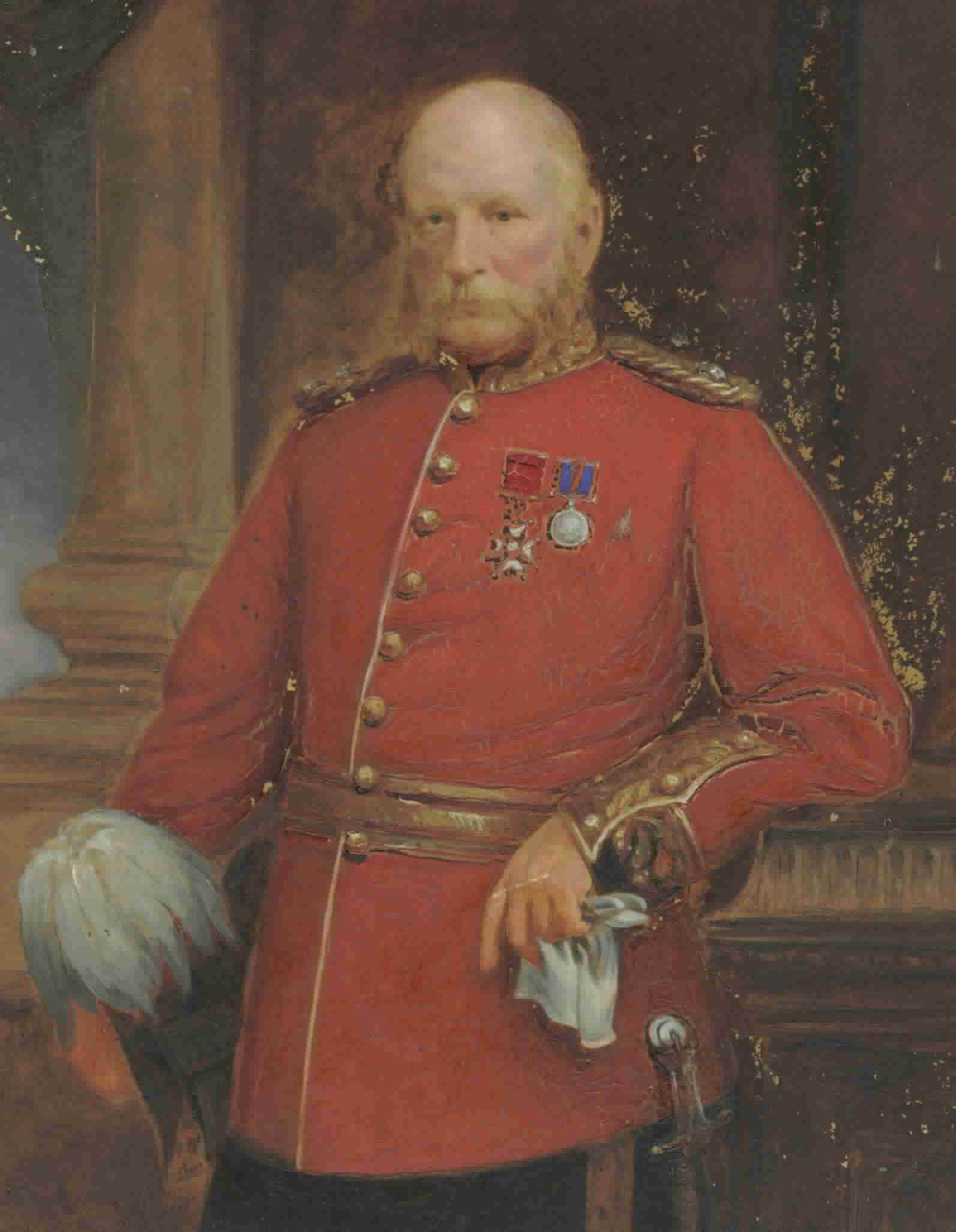
- Greer in 1869
- Born: Henry Harpur Greer; 24 February 1821; Moy, County Tyrone, Ireland
- Died: 27 March 1886 (aged 65) Moy, County Tyrone, Ireland
- Allegiance: United Kingdom
- Branch: (United Kingdom of Great Britain and Ireland) British Army
- Rank: Lieutenant General
- Commands: 68th Regiment of Foot (Durham)
- Conflicts: New Zealand Wars; Tauranga campaign; Gate Pā; Te Ranga
- Awards: Companion of the Order of the Bath; New Zealand War Medal
- Spouse: Agnes Isabella Knox (m. 1850)

Lieutenant General Henry Harpur Greer CB (24 February 1821 – 27 March 1886) was an Ulster-Scots officer who served in the British Army during the Victorian era. During the New Zealand Wars, he commanded the 68th Durham Regiment of Foot during the Tauranga campaign, and commanded the entirety of the British forces at the Battle of Te Ranga.

Greer died in Moy, Ireland, on 27 March 1886. The Tauranga suburb of Greerton is named after him.
