= Hēni Te Kiri Karamū =

New Zealand Māori warrior and temperance organiser (1840–1933)

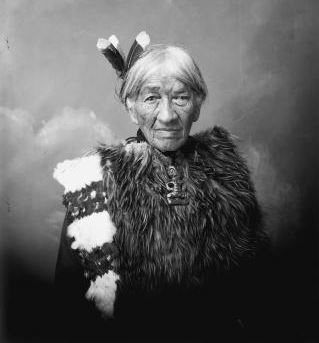
- Born: 14 November 1840; Kaitaia, New Zealand
- Died: 24 June 1933 (aged 92); Rotorua, New Zealand
- Other names: Hēni Pore, Jane Russell, Jane Foley
- Occupations: Tribal leader, warrior, teacher, interpreter
- Partner(s): Te Kiri Karamū; Denis Stephen Foley
- Children: six sons and five daughters

Hēni Te Kiri Karamū (1840 – 24 June 1933), known later as Hēni Pore (anglicised as Jane Foley, after her second husband's surname), was a New Zealand Māori wāhine toa 'woman warrior'. In later life she worked in the Women's Christian Temperance Union (WCTU NZ), and was elected corresponding secretary of its Ohinemutu chapter and served as the WCTU NZ honorary secretary for the Māori Mission of Rotorua.

== Biography ==
Hēni Te Kiri Karamū was born in Kaitaia, New Zealand, in 1840. Of descent she belonged to the Ngāti Uenukukōpako and Te Arawa iwi. Her mother Maraea (also known as Pihohau or Pikokau) had been taken by Ngāpuhi to Northland, after the iwi had taken Mokoia Island. She spent much of her childhood in mission schools in Maketu and Auckland, becoming an assistant teacher at the Wesleyan Native Institution in Three Kings. When her parents moved back to Northland she followed, marrying Te Kiri Karamū, a Ngāti Rangiteaorere kauri gum digger, and living at Katikati. In 1861, she left her husband after a disagreement, taking her children to live at Maraetai with her mother.

=== New Zealand Wars ===
Hēni Te Kiri Karamū and her family fought in the Invasion of the Waikato and the Tauranga campaign of 1863 and 1864 among Ngāti Koheriki (a group of Ngāti Pāoa led by Wī Kōkā), supporting the Māori King Movement. During the war, Hēni Te Kiri Karamū was known for carrying a baby on her back during the war. During the conflict, Hēni Te Kiri Karamū created three flags during this time for Ngāti Koheriki, including a red silk flag named Aotearoa, now housed at the Auckland Museum. She was the only woman present at the Battle of Gate Pā (1864), having stayed as she was recognised as a capable warrior, and to not leave her brother Neri behind. During the battle, Hēni Te Kiri Karamū gave water to the wounded British soldiers.

After the Battle of Gate Pā, Hēni Te Kiri Karamū moved to Hapokai on Mokoia Island. In 1865 and 1866, she aligned with the British Crown to fight Pai Mārire. Working alongside her uncle Mātenga Te Ruru, they captured Ngāi Te Rangi leader Hōri Tūpaea. In 1865, Hēni Te Kiri Karamū fought among Te Arawa, against Pai Mārire-aligned iwi near Whakatāne.

In 1869 she married Denis Stephen Foley, moving to Katikati, and having three daughters and three sons. At this time, she was more widely known as Hēni Pore. In 1870, Hēni applied for a protection order against Foley who had drunkenly attacked her, later returning to Rotorua.

=== Temperance movement ===
In later years, she worked as an interpreter, and was active with the Women's Christian Temperance Union New Zealand (WCTU NZ). She is first mentioned in the WCTU NZ White Ribbon reports in September 1896 as the secretary of the largest of the Māori Unions with 52 members (which included 13 male members of whom three were chiefs) and several departments: temperance, social purity, Sunday school, Band of Hope, sewing class and Bible class. Signing her name as J. Foley, she wrote to the WCTU NZ president, Annie Jane Schnackenberg, in March 1897 to complain that the 200 members of the Rotorua area Unions had not been notified of the national convention that year in Christchurch. She stated that their membership dues had been paid but no further communications had been received. Schnackenberg replied with apologies and looked forward to seeing their delegates at the next annual convention. In advance of the national convention, Foley travelled with Ellen Ann Hewitt, the WCTU NZ superintendent of Māori work, to Maketu then Te Puke and Te Ngae. In 1898 she was featured in a WCTU NZ public meeting in Napier where she spoke about her loyalty to her brother as the reason she joined the rebel forces against the British during the wars. By 1900 Annie Jane Schnackenberg, the new WCTU NZ superintendent of Māori work, paid for her to become the honorary secretary for all of the Māori mission in Rotorua. She was still the secretary for the Ohinemutu Union. Her report to the national convention of the WCTU NZ describing her work that previous year can be found in the White Ribbon April 1900 issue. She was at Rotorua to represent the WCTU NZ during the visit of the Duke and Duchess of Cornwall and York in 1902, and she continued to work for the WCTU NZ through 1903.

She died in June 1933 in Rotorua and is buried at the Rotorua Cemetery.
