= Bill Gallagher (inventor) =

New Zealand inventor (1911–1990)

Bill Gallagher MBE
- Born: Alfred William Gallagher; 17 May 1911; Hamilton, New Zealand
- Died: 8 August 1990 (aged 79); Hamilton, New Zealand
- Occupations: Inventor; Engineer; Businessman
- Known for: Popularising the electric fence
- Relatives: Bill Gallagher (son)

Alfred William Gallagher MBE (17 May 1911 – 8 August 1990) was a New Zealand inventor, manufacturing engineer and businessman. He is notable for popularising the electric fence.

== Early life ==
Alfred William Gallagher, later known as Bill Gallagher, was born in Hamilton, in the Waikato province of New Zealand, on 17 May 1911, to Alfred John Gallagher, a dairy farmer, and his wife, Sarah Matilda née Clow. The eldest of six children, he was initially educated at Te Kowhai School. In 1920, the family moved from their dairy farm at Horotiu to a larger property at Papamoa, in the Bay of Plenty. He started working fulltime on the farm in 1926, once he had completed his formal schooling. Within a few years, he, together with his brother Henry, took over responsibility for the farm after their parent's marriage broke down and his father moved to Australia.

By 1936, Gallagher was married; he had met his wife, Millicent May née Murray, through involvement with a church at Te Puke. The couple would have five children. He was now farming at Horsham Downs, back in the Waikato near where he spent his childhood; the farm at Papamoa had been sold and his share of the proceeds went towards the purchase of the Horsham Downs farm.

== Development of the electric fence ==
Gallagher was technically creative from an early age, devising various gadgets to assist in their farming work. In the 1930s, he discovered that electricity could be useful in confining animals when he made a triggering mechanism that made a car electrically active when a horse rubbed against it. By 1937, he had developed an electric fence for farmers, selling battery powered units and being granted a patent. In 1940, he had moved his family to Hamilton East where he continued to manufacture his electric fence. Shortly afterwards, he, his other brother Vivian, and a friend began working in Wellington, making electric fences and gas producers for use with vehicles. During this time, he invented a filter for a gas producer. He remained in Wellington for two years before he returned to Hamilton. As the Second World War was well underway, he was co-opted to work for the Colonial Ammunition Company, which had been relocated from Auckland to a site in Hamilton East. Later, as part of the war effort, he repaired farming machinery.

== Postwar period ==
After the war, Gallagher resumed manufacturing gas producers, setting up a facility at his property on Seddon Road in Hamilton and employing six workers. His business also carried out tractor conversions and made farming equipment, including his battery-powered electric fence. With his brothers, Henry and Vivian, he invented a spinning top-dresser. By the 1950s, his business interests expanded into commercial fishing, operating a trawling venture from Raglan although this was not profitable. He also built boats, including an 88-foot vessel that was used for trips to Australia and to the Pacific Islands.

In 1963, Gallagher Engineering Limited was established. A mainstay of the business was the electric fence, now revised to run off mains power which previously had been illegal. Gallagher's sons, William and John, worked for the company and soon became increasingly influential. The former played a major role in exporting the firm's products to Australia which in turn inspired Gallagher to look to develop markets in the United Kingdom. By the 1980s, he was less involved in the company but remained as a director until 1989.

== Later life and legacy ==
In his retirement, Gallagher continued to tinker with gadgets, developing a hoist for use in hospitals for transferring infirm patients and doing mechanical repairs around a retirement facility, the Assisi Home and Hospital in Matangi. In the 1990 New Year Honours, he was appointed a Member of the Order of the British Empire, for services to the community. He died from cancer in Hamilton on 8 August 1990, and was buried in Hamilton Park Cemetery.

In 2012, Gallagher was posthumously inducted into the New Zealand Business Hall of Fame, and in 2017, he was a posthumous inductee into the Waikato Business Hall of Fame. As of 2019, his son, Sir William Gallagher is the chief executive officer and executive director of the business established by his father. His other son, John Gallagher, left his day-to-day role in the business in 1997 but remains on the board of directors.
