= Tauranga campaign =

Part of the New Zealand Wars (1864)

- Part of the New Zealand Wars
Date	21 January – 21 June 1864
Location	Bay of Plenty, New Zealand
Result	British victory

Belligerents
United Kingdom: Colony of New Zealand	Tauranga Māori

Commanders and leaders
(United Kingdom of Great Britain and Ireland) Duncan Cameron (United Kingdom of Great Britain and Ireland) Henry Harpur Greer	Rāwiri Puhirake †; Hoera te Mataatai

Units involved
(United Kingdom of Great Britain and Ireland) Royal Navy: HMS Miranda; HMS Esk; HMS Curacoa; HMS Falcon; HMS Harrier; HMS Eclipse; Royal Marine Artillery; (United Kingdom of Great Britain and Ireland) British Army: 12th Regiment; 14th Regiment; 40th Regiment; 43rd Regiment; 65th Regiment; 68th Regiment; Royal Engineers; Royal Artillery; Militia: 1st Waikato Militia	Tauranga: Ngāi Te Rangi; Ngāti Koheriki; Ngāti Pikiao; Ngāti Porou; Ngāti Pūkenga; Ngāti Ranginui

Strength
1,700	500

Casualties and losses
44 killed and 119 wounded	98 to 123 killed and 12 to 17 wounded

The Tauranga campaign was a six-month-long armed conflict in New Zealand's Bay of Plenty in early 1864, and part of the New Zealand Wars that were fought over issues of land ownership and sovereignty. The campaign was a sequel to the invasion of Waikato, which aimed to crush the Māori King (Kingitanga) Movement that was viewed by the colonial government as a challenge to the supremacy of the British monarchy.

British forces suffered a humiliating defeat in the Battle of Gate Pā on 29 April 1864, with 31 killed and 80 wounded despite outnumbering their Māori foe, but saved face seven weeks later by routing their enemy at the Battle of Te Ranga, in which more than 100 Māori were killed or fatally wounded, including their commander, Rawiri Puhirake.

== Background ==
In late January 1864 British commander General Duncan Cameron—at the time still facing the intimidating Paterangi line of Māori defences in the Waikato campaign—despatched by sea an expedition to occupy Tauranga, through which he believed his enemy were transporting men and supplies from the East Coast. The local Ngāi Te Rangi Māori were hostile to the government, a major gunpowder store was known to be inland of Tauranga and the district was an important source of food for Māori fighting British forces in the Waikato. While Colonel Henry Greer was landed with his force at Te Papa, where they built two redoubts, Captain Robert Jenkins, commander of HMS Miranda, was ordered to blockade the harbour to prevent the arrival of more Māori reinforcements.

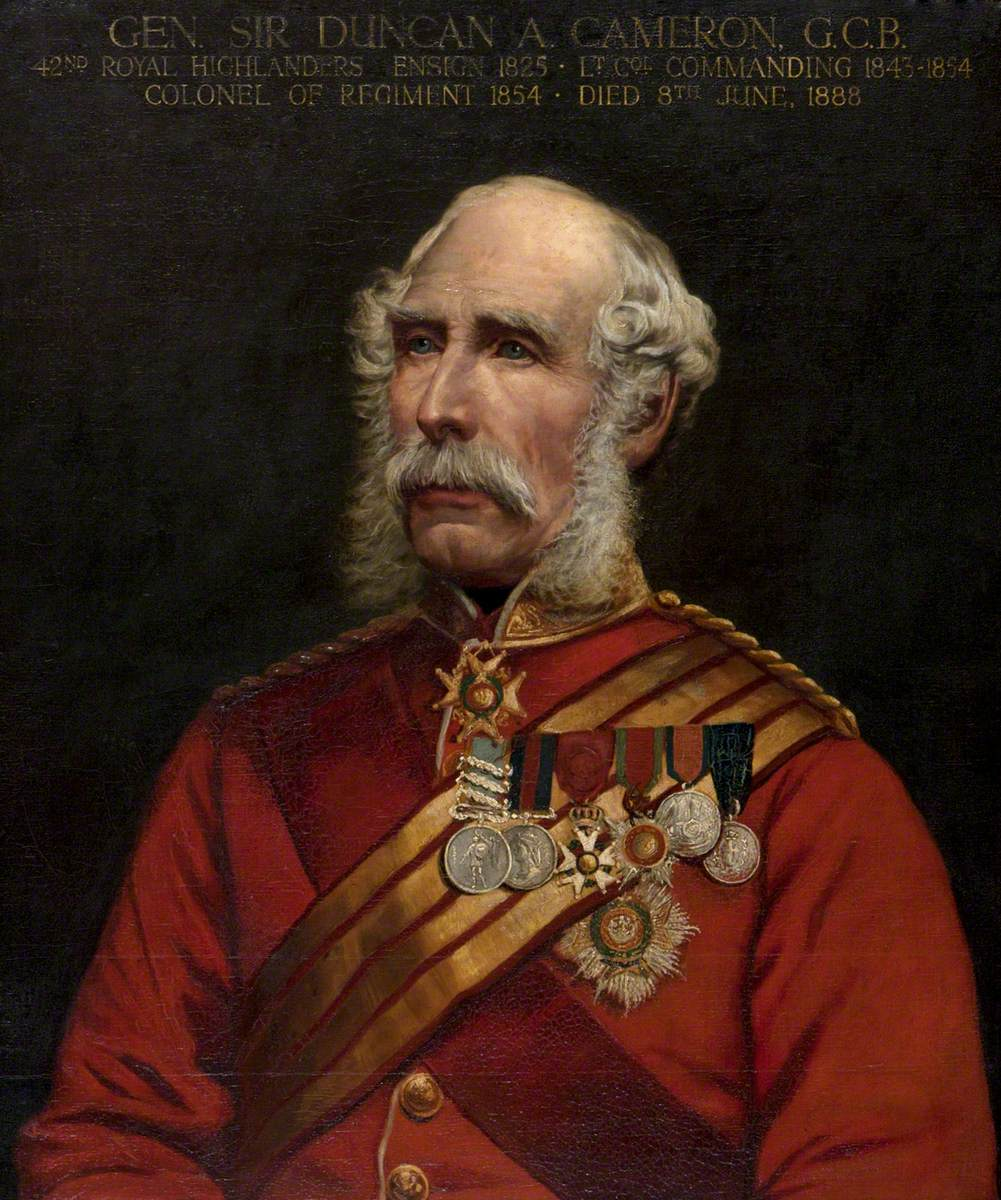
Lieutenant-General Duncan Cameron, Commander-in-Chief of British forces in New Zealand, 1863–1865.

Though Cameron's strategy gained the enthusiastic support of Premier Frederick Whitaker and his cabinet, who were keen to use the 1863 confiscations legislation to open fresh territory for European settlement, Governor George Grey was opposed, fearing it would raise rebellion in more Māori tribes, including those that had thus far refrained from supporting the Kingitanga movement. Grey withdrew his initial assent for Whitaker's orders to take an aggressive stance and instead directed the Tauranga expedition's commander, Brigadier George Carey, to remain strictly on the defensive, apart from intercepting armed bands en route to the Waikato.

Alerted to their arrival, Ngāi Te Rangi warriors returned from the Waikato battlefields and built a hilltop fort, or pā, on high ground at Te Waoku near the Waimapu Stream overlooking the Bay of Plenty, where they established a garrison of about 100 men. Ngāi Te Rangi chief Rawiri Puhirake taunted Carey in a letter, challenging him to fight, then in April 1864 moved closer to the British base to occupy to a new ridge-top position at Pukehinahina, a locality known to Europeans as "The Gate" because of the presence of a post-and-rail fence and gateway used by Māori to block Pākehā trespassers. The new fortification, which became known as the "Gate Pā", was built just 5 km from imperial troops, who were prohibited by Grey's orders from intervening. Puhirake, finding it increasingly difficult to keep his force together without a battle in prospect, again attempted to goad the British into action.

Meanwhile, fighting had already broken out nearby. A large contingent of East Coast Māori, possibly as many as 700 warriors, were making their way towards the conflict at Waikato. Their route took them through the territory of another tribe which saw themselves as allies of the Pākehā, the Arawa tribe based around Rotorua. Forewarned of this, the Arawa chiefs called back their tribesmen, many of whom were working in Auckland or further north. Pausing in Tauranga to borrow guns from the British, they hastened onward to Rotorua. Four hundred warriors of the tribe were mobilised and they met and held the East Coast Māori on 7 April in a two-day battle on the shores of Lake Rotoiti. On 27 April fighting broke out again on the coast, with Māori loyal to the Crown supported by the 43rd Regiment and British corvettes firing on Kingite Māori as they were pursued through the sand dunes.

== Battle of Gate Pā ==
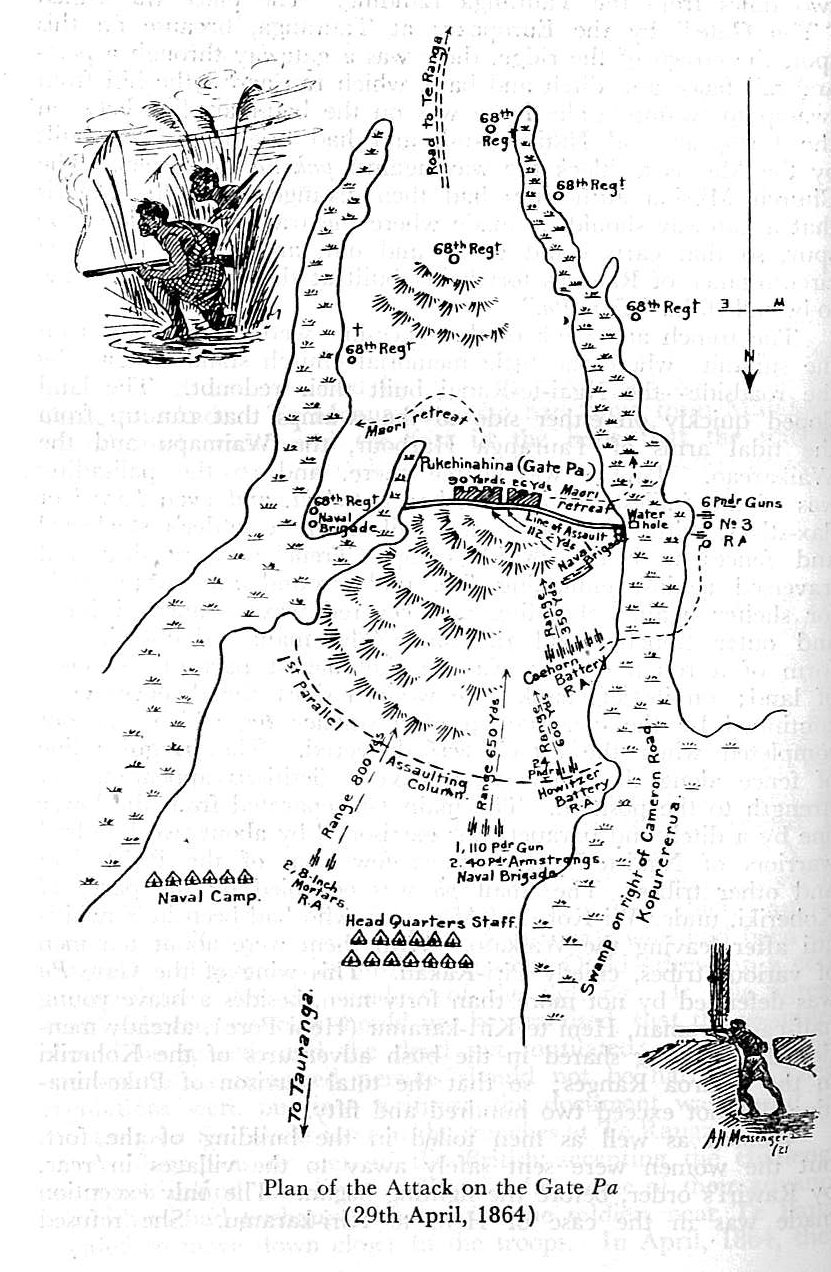
Plan of the attack on Gate Pā

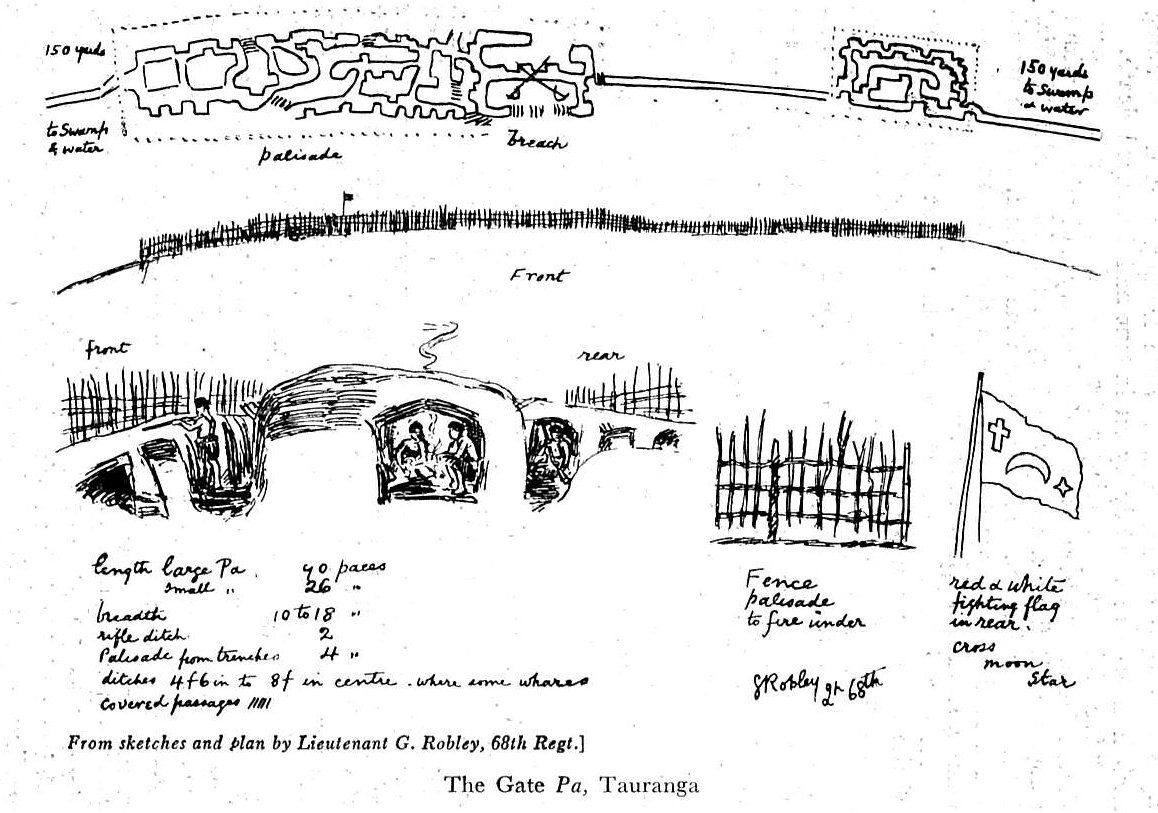
Gate Pā, based on a sketch by Lieutenant Horatio Gordon Robley.

Still hoping to provoke an attack, the 250 Ngāi Te Rangi fighters at Pukehinahina enlarged the existing trench and banks and transformed the pā into a system of two redoubts, including a honeycomb of rua, or anti-artillery bunkers. Ngāi Te Rangi garrisoned the main redoubt, and about 30 members of the Ngāti Koheriki hapu and another 10 men from Piri-Rikau and other hapu manned the smaller redoubt. With timber scarce in surrounding swampland, palisading was frail, but the location of the redoubt on a hilltop, and the total span of the palisading gave their enemy the impression of greater strength than it actually possessed. In all, the total garrison of Gate Pā was about 230 men.

On 5 April, Cameron abandoned hope of pursuing Ngāti Hauā leader and prominent Kingite Wiremu Tamihana after his foe evacuated the besieged Te Tiki o te Ihingarangi pā near Lake Karapiro. Cameron switched his attention to Tauranga, arriving there on 21 April in HMS Esk and established his headquarters at Tauranga. In addition to the reinforcements on Esk, more from Auckland arrived on HMS Falcon. Within days Cameron decided he had sufficient forces to finally march against Gate Pā.

On the afternoon of 28 April, Cameron launched an hour-long attack on the front of Gate Pā with four batteries of artillery placed at a range of between 350 and 800 metres. The battery—the heaviest used in the wars of 1863–1864—included a 110-pounder Armstrong gun, two 40-pounder and two six-pounder Armstrongs, two 24-pounder howitzers, two eight-inch mortars, and six Coehorn mortars. According to accounts by Hēni Te Kiri Karamū and Hōri Ngātai, the first victims of the British cannon shots were Church of England ministers conducting prayers.

Late in the night Greer moved his 700 men from the 68th Regiment across swamps to the east of Gate Pā under cover of darkness and rain to take up a position to the rear of the redoubt to cut off a Māori retreat. Those forces were joined by a detachment of the Naval Brigade from the warships Esk, Falcon and HMS Miranda. By daybreak on 29 April Cameron had a total of about 1,650 men surrounding the pā: 700 of the 68th Regiment, 420 from the Naval Brigade, 300 of the 43rd Regiment, 50 Royal Artillery, and another 180 members of the 12th, 14th, 40th and 65th Regiments.

At first light on 29 April the assembled guns and mortars opened fire again, this time maintaining the bombardment for more than eight hours. They destroyed the palisade and completely suppressed Māori gunfire. An estimated 30 tonnes of shell and shot were dropped on or near the Māori position, killing about 15 of the defenders.

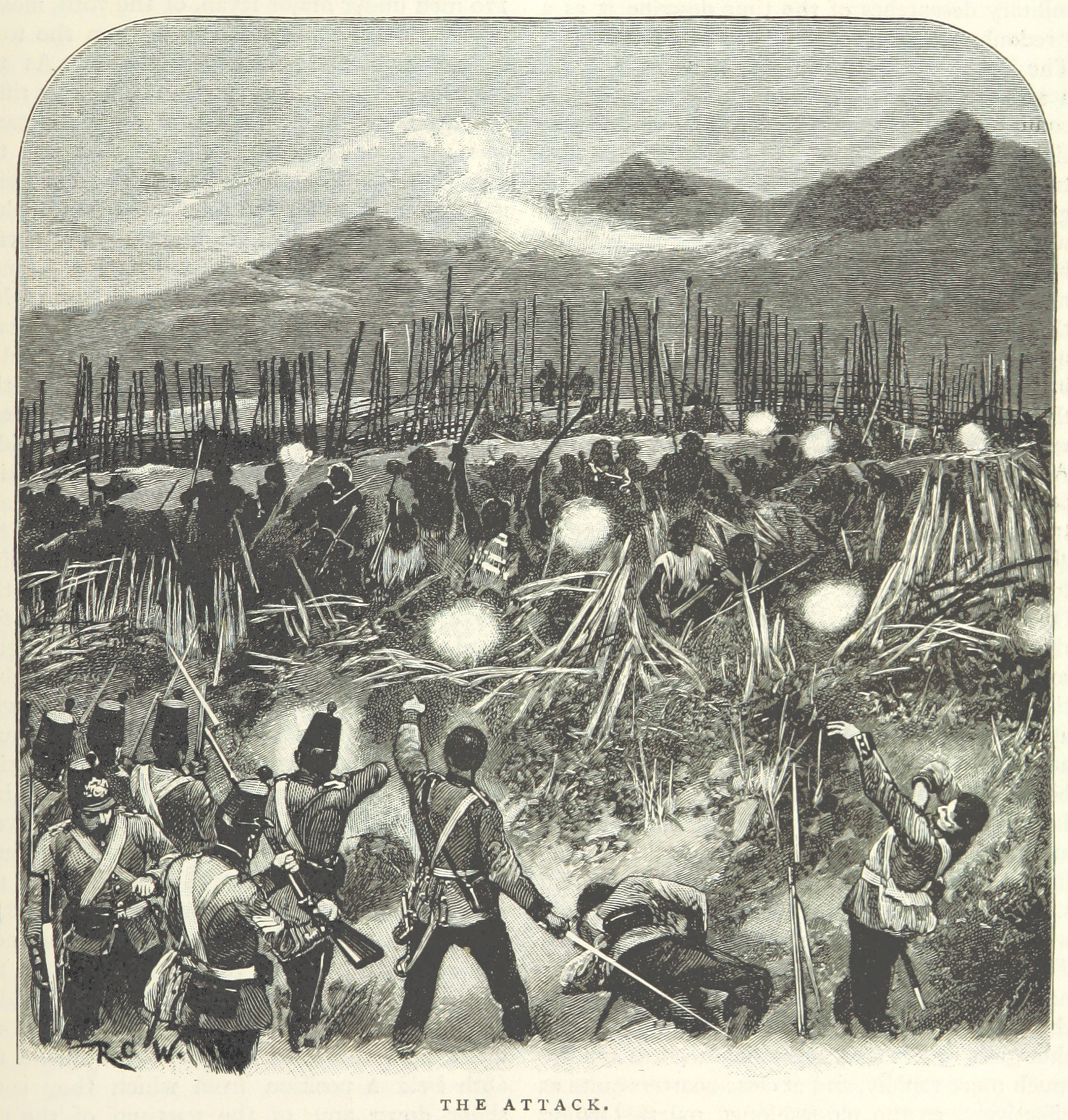
The attack on the pā (from a British book)

At about 4pm, with no sign of life in the pā, Cameron ordered an assault by 300 men—a combined force of Naval Brigade under Commander Hay and the 43rd Regiment, led by Lieutenant-Colonel H.G. Booth—who ran in four abreast with fixed bayonets. Another 300 men followed at a distance as a reserve. Some in the initial British assault force were shot as they entered the main pā, and inside the redoubt more fell as they engaged in hand-to-hand combat with Māori armed with shotguns and mere (short clubs). A lull of about five minutes occurred, during which time Captain G.R. Greaves, who was with the leading files of the assault party, left the pā and reported to Cameron that the redoubt had been captured and that British casualties were light.

But minutes later, as the rear of the pā was breached by the 68th Regiment, all changed. In a sequence of events that is still unclear, fierce fighting erupted, taking a heavy toll on the invaders and panicked British forces began streaming out of the pā. Historian James Cowan wrote: "More than a hundred of the assaulting column were casualties, and the glacis and the interior of the pā were strewn with dead or dying. The Maori suffered too, but not severely." Thirty-one of the British force died, including 10 officers, while 80 were wounded. At least 25–30 Māori were killed or missing.

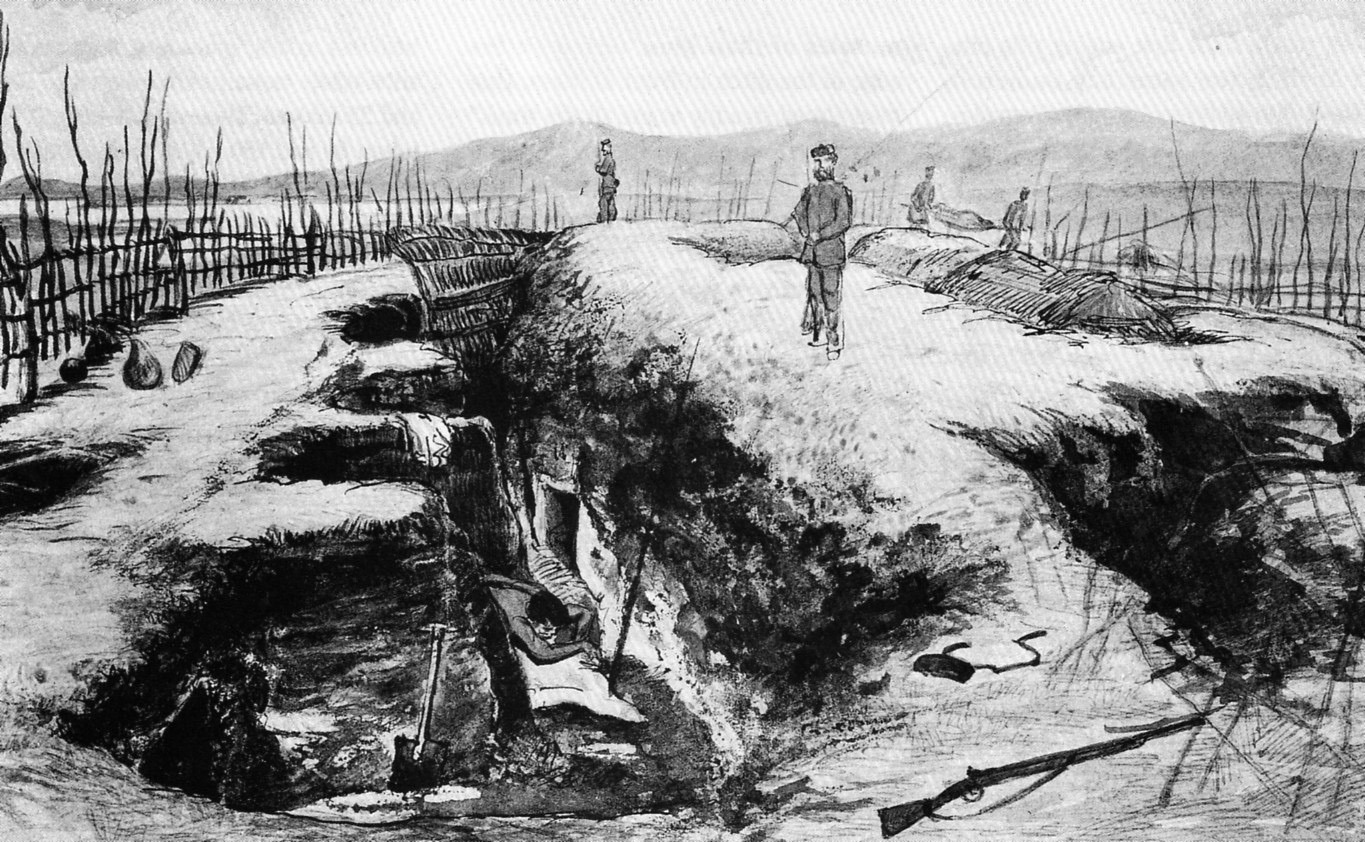
Gate Pā after its evacuation on 30 April, based on a sketch by Lieutenant Horatio Gordon Robley.

Several theories exist to explain the British stampede from the pā. A contemporary report by a seaman in the pā suggested that the flood of soldiers from the 68th Regiment at the rear was mistaken for Māori reinforcements. Historian James Belich has postulated that the bulk of the Māori garrison remained concealed in camouflaged bunkers as the British forces stormed the pā, before unleashing waves of heavy volleys from close range on the British, who were almost standing on their hidden foes. Belich cites descriptions of the main redoubt as being "like ratholes everywhere, with covered ways and underground chambers" and notes that Rawiri Puhirake ordered defenders to "not utter a word or fire a shot till the proper time came for the order". (Note: Belich is citing an account of the battle by Hōri Ngātai recorded by James Cowan.) Belich claims that by providing only a feeble defence from the garrison during the storming of the pā and keeping his garrison hidden, Rawiri Puhirake employed a "remarkable tactical ploy ... brilliantly implemented as well as brilliantly conceived" to lure the British into a deadly trap.

As night fell, the Gate Pā garrison, assuming the site would be stormed the next morning, evacuated their position, passing through the lines of the 68th Regiment and fleeing across surrounding swamps before dispersing.

=== Reaction to British defeat ===
Gate Pā was the single most devastating defeat suffered by the British military in the New Zealand Wars: while British casualties totalled more than a third of the storming party, Māori losses are generally unknown but thought to number at least 25–30, including Ngāi Te Rangi chiefs Te Reweti, Eru Puhirake, Tikitu, Te Kani, Te Rangihau, and Te Wharepouri, and Te Urungawera chief Te Kau. Te Moana-nui and Te Ipu were among the wounded, estimated at at least 25–30. To contemporaries Gate Pā was seen as a shattering and humiliating defeat, with one newspaper noting that the "gallant" force had been "trampled in the dust ... by a horde of half-naked, half-armed savages". (Note: Belich, citing an 1864 article, "Samuel Mitchell and the Victoria Cross", from an unknown periodical.)

Grey, horrified by the disaster, began exploring ways to limit the extent of land confiscations and thus reduce Māori resistance. Grey visited Tauranga on 12 May to confer with Cameron and engaged some neutral Māori to act as intermediaries with the Kingites to negotiate a peace agreement.

Three days later, on 15 May, Cameron advised Grey he had decided to cease aggressive operations in Tauranga; the following day he left for Auckland with 700 men, leaving Greer in command of Te Papa with instructions to remain strictly on the defensive. On 20 May the Māori mediators reported that the Kingites were willing to surrender their arms "if they can have full claims over their lands and the Governor will promise to see that no harm befalls them". By early June several Ngāi Te Rangi warriors had handed in their guns and naval commodore William Wiseman reported to London that hostilities in the area had ceased.

== Battle of Te Ranga ==
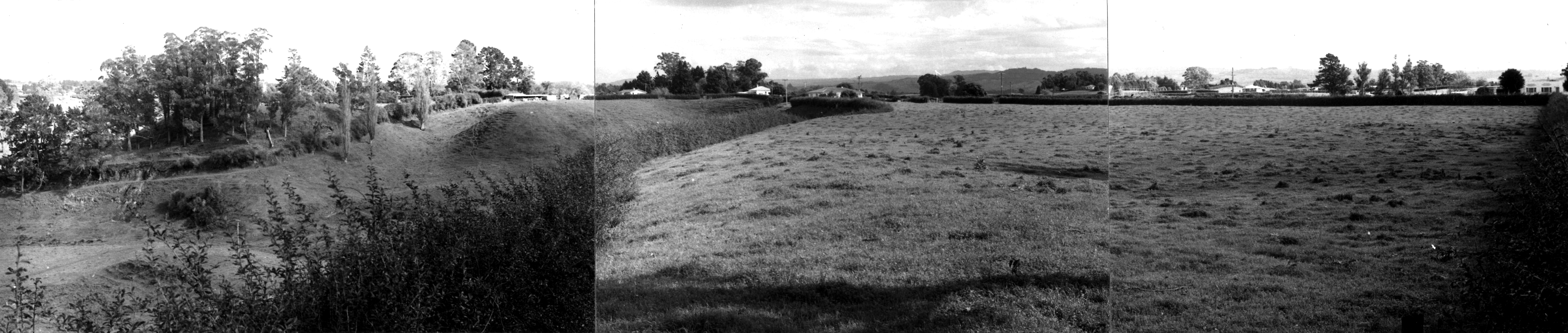
Te Ranga battleground.

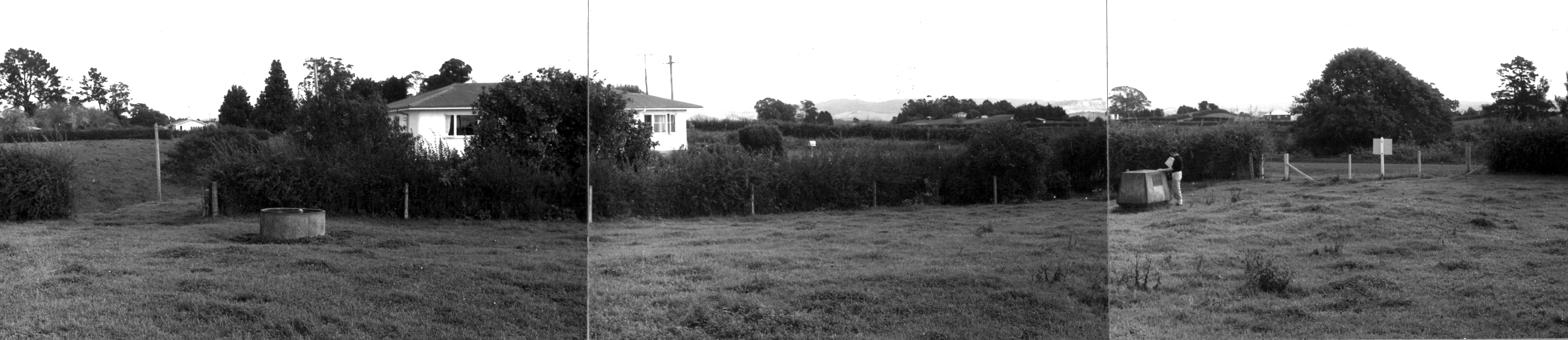
Te Ranga battleground.

Despite government hopes of peace, Kingite forces—newly reinforced by hapu of Ngāti Pikiao, from Rotoiti, as well as a Ngati-Porou war party from the East Cape and commanded by Hoera te Mataatai—decided in June to again challenge the British forces. They selected Te Ranga, a steep but flat-topped ridge about 5 km from Gate Pā, and began working on entrenchments and rifle pits to cut off a bush track.

On 21 June Greer, leading a reconnaissance patrol of about 600 men of the 43rd and 68th Regiments and 1st Waikato Militia, came upon the 500-strong Māori force labouring on Te Ranga's defences. Knowing any delay would allow his foe to strengthen their defences, Greer chose to launch an immediate attack. He sent back to Te Papa for reinforcements, then deployed his men to fan out and open fire on the pā's outposts and trenches. As the reinforcements—220 men including cavalry and one Armstrong gun—arrived two hours later, he ordered a charge on Te Ranga. The Māori responded to the ferocity of the advance of British bayonets with double-barrelled shotguns, but had little time to reload and were forced to fight hand-to-hand with mere. Between 83 and 120 Māori were killed or fatally wounded, half of them with bayonets; Gate Pā commander Rawiri Puhirake was among the dead. His death prompted the survivors to flee. Thirteen privates of the 43rd and 68th Regiments were killed in the battle, and six officers and 33 non-commissioned officers and privates wounded. (Note: Belich's analysis of initial official reports suggests 68 Maori were found dead in the trenches, 27 wounded were captured and later died, and another 10 prisoners surrendered unhurt. The total number of guns seized was also 68. He says Maori casualties were exaggerated in later accounts of the battle. Adding the number of prisoners to those found dead inflated the number of the dead to 120—a number then universally accepted by historians.)

Settlers celebrated the success at Te Ranga, the last serious engagement of the Tauranga campaign, as "by far the most brilliant achievement obtained throughout the whole war". Coming so soon after the humiliating defeat at Gate Pā, they viewed it as a satisfying act of revenge that reclaimed the honour of the troops. But Cameron, who was showing an increasing distaste for the war against a foe among whom he found more courage and chivalry than among the colonists, remained steadfast in his opposition to further aggressive actions.

One hundred and thirty-three Ngāi Te Rangi warriors surrendered to the British on 24 July. By 29 August the entire tribe with the exception of one hapu—36 members of Piri Rakau—had followed suit. The tribe gave up some 50,000 acres (200 km^{2}) of land and 81 guns, although they still retained a number of firearms in their possession.

== Aftermath ==
Piri Rakau, the Waikato hapu that refused to surrender in 1864, fled into the hills behind Tauranga where they lived in hiding at Kuranui. With them were Ngati Porou followers of the Pai Mārire religious cult who arrived in exile about 1869 and Kuranui became a place of sanctuary for many people of different tribal origins. The community gave support to Te Kooti when he ventured north to Matamata in early 1870. Te Kooti, having been rebuffed by King Tāwhiao in western Waikato and the King Country, was trying to lay claim to the eastern Waikato. Two Arawa hapu also joined Te Kooti's rebels, but Tauranga Māori were anxious not to renew the war in Tauranga and distanced themselves from Te Kooti. Chief Tana Taingakawa, Wiremu Tamihana's son from Ngati Haua, wrote to Colonel Moule urging him not to fight Te Kooti in his land.
